= List of Gulf War military equipment =

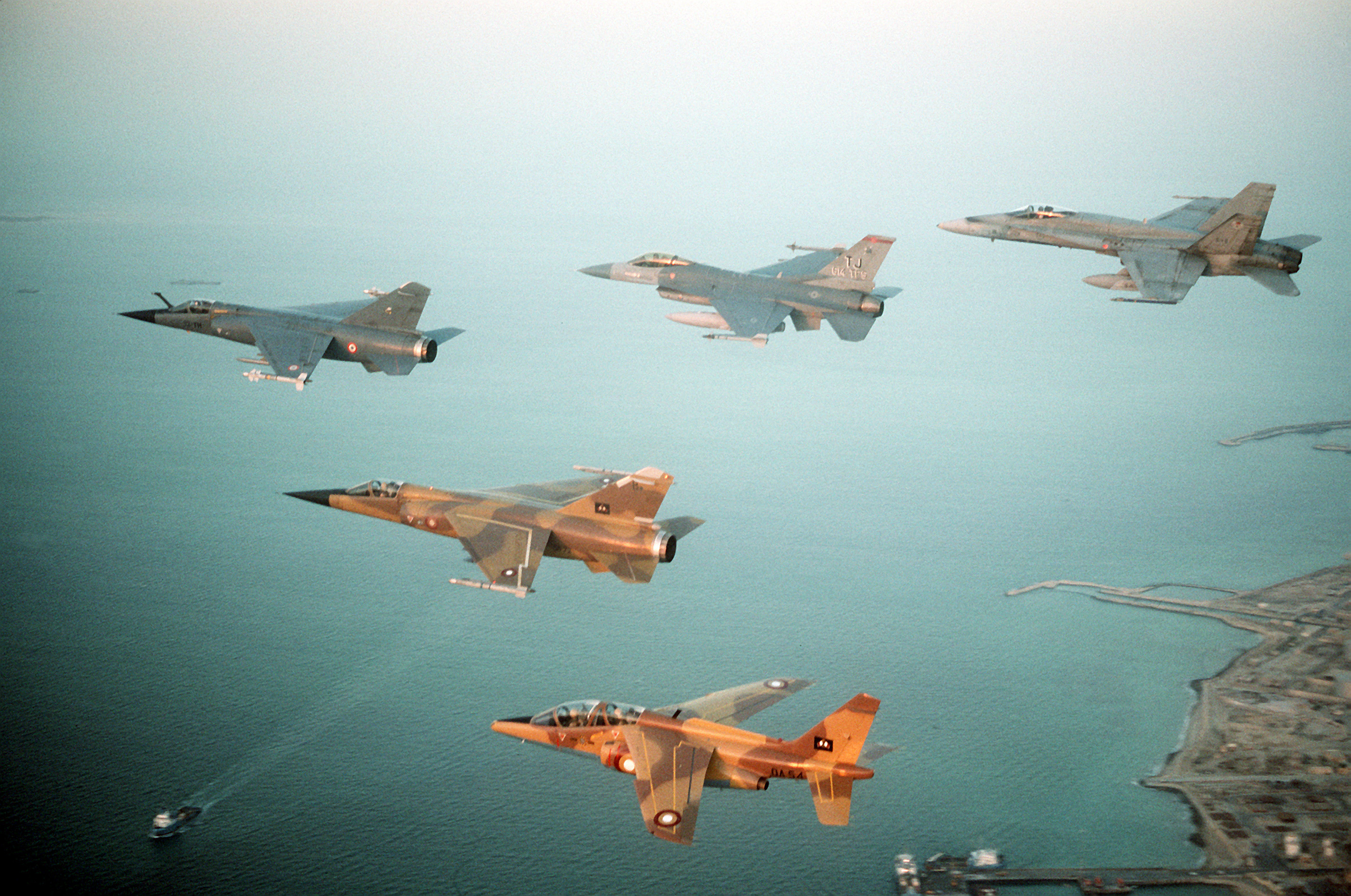
Coalition aircraft in formation during Operation Desert Shield.

This list of Gulf War military equipment compiles various military weapons and vehicles used by different nations in the Gulf War of 1990–1991. For coalition partners themselves (and their contributions), see the coalition of the Gulf War.

== Coalition ==
Flag of the United States

=== United States ===
==== Webbing ====
- ALICE (All-purpose lightweight individual carrying equipment)
- M-1956 load-carrying equipment (used by rear echelon soldiers or soldiers who buy them prior to deployment)
- IIFS (Individual Integrated Fighting System)

==== Headgear ====
- PASGT helmet
- Boonie hat
- Patrol cap (used by U.S. commanding officers and worn when not in combat)
- M1 helmet (used by rear echelon soldiers)
- Maroon beret (used by 82nd Airborne Division paratroopers)

==== Gas masks ====
- M17 gas mask

==== Combat uniforms ====
- Battle Dress Uniform
- Desert Battle Dress Uniform
- Desert Camouflage Uniform
- Night pattern overgarments in Desert Night Camouflage
- NBC Suit (Nuclear, Biological, Chemical) - A suit worn by U.S. soldiers due to threat of gas attacks by Iraq

==== Footwear ====
- Jungle boot (used by US soldiers before Desert combat boots)
- Desert combat boot (Issued in 1991 during the Gulf War to replace the Vietnam-era jungle boots)

==== Infantry weapons ====
- Ka-Bar
- M9 bayonet
- M7 bayonet
- M67 grenade
- M1911A1 pistol
- M9 pistol
- P226 pistol
- Smith & Wesson Model 10 victory
- M1D Garand, limited service
- M1 Garand
- M1 carbine
- M14 rifle
- M16A1
- M16A2
- CAR-15
- M60 machine gun
- M61 Vulcan
- M3 submachine gun
- FN Minimi
- M2 Browning
- Heckler & Koch MP5/MP5A3
- M1919 Browning machine gun
- M249
- M240
- M134 Minigun
- Barrett M82
- M24 Sniper Weapon System
- M21 Sniper Weapon System
- M40 rifle
- M870 shotgun
- M2HB
- TOW missile
- M72 LAW
- M136 AT4
- M47 Dragon
- AT4
- Carl Gustaf 8.4 cm recoilless rifle
- M203
- Mk 19
- M18 Claymore mine

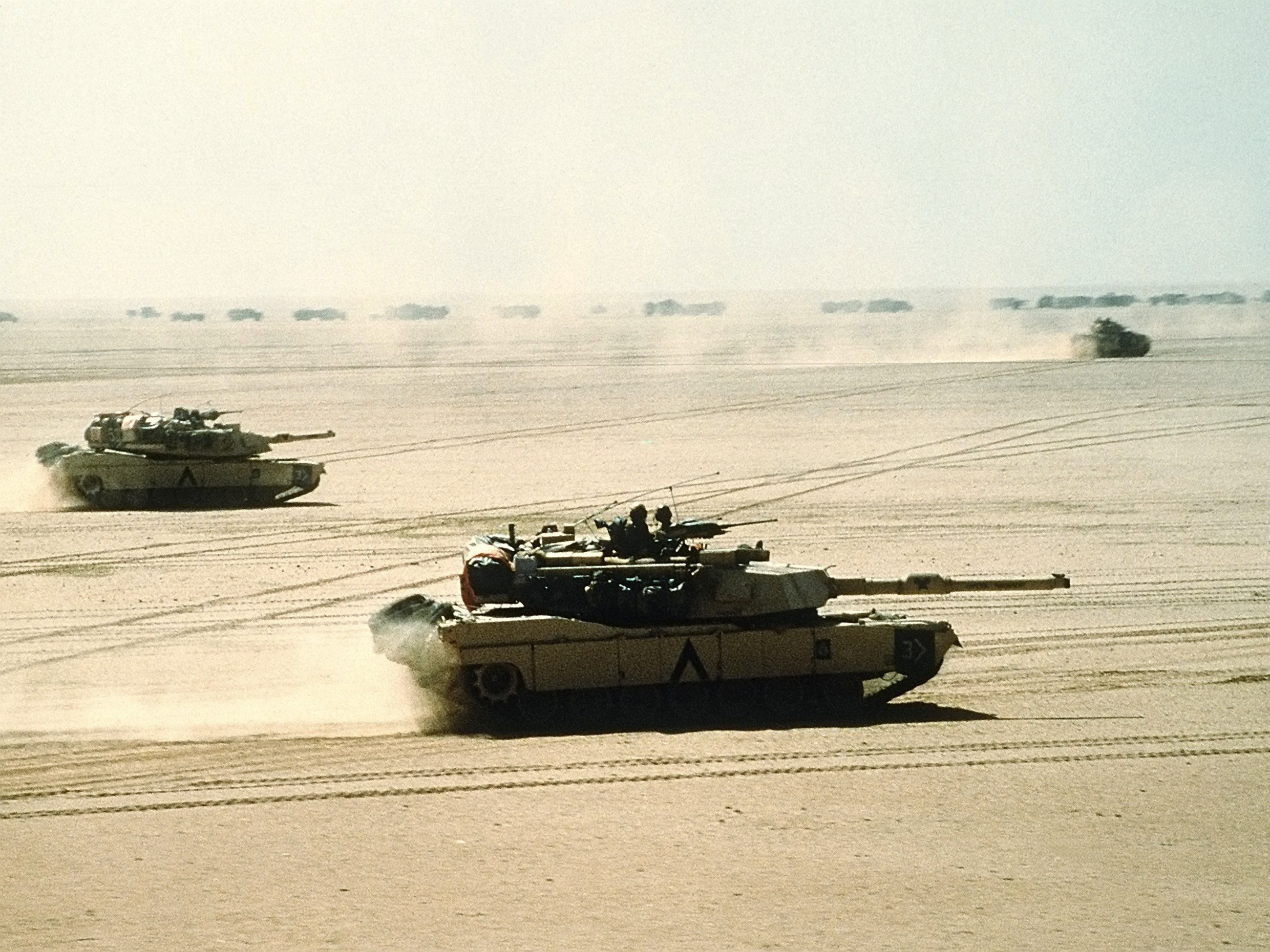
M1 Abrams in formation, February 1991.

==== Tanks ====
- M1A1 Abrams
- M1A1 HA Abrams Heavy Armor
- M60A1 Patton (USMC)
- M60A3 Patton TTS (US Army)
- M551A1 Sheridan TTS (US Army - 82nd Airborne Division)

==== Armoured fighting vehicles ====
- M2A2 Bradley IFV (Infantry Fighting Vehicle)
- M3A2 Bradley CFV (Cavalry Fighting Vehicle)
- AAVP7A1 Assault Amphibious Vehicle Personnel (USMC)
- LAV-25 Light Armored Vehicle (USMC)
- LAV-AT Light Armored Vehicle (Anti-Tank) (USMC)
- M113A2/A3 (armored personnel carrier)
- M93A1 Fox NBC Reconnaissance System (UOR acquisition from Germany)
- M901A1 Improved TOW Vehicle

==== Self-propelled artillery/mortars/rockets/missiles ====
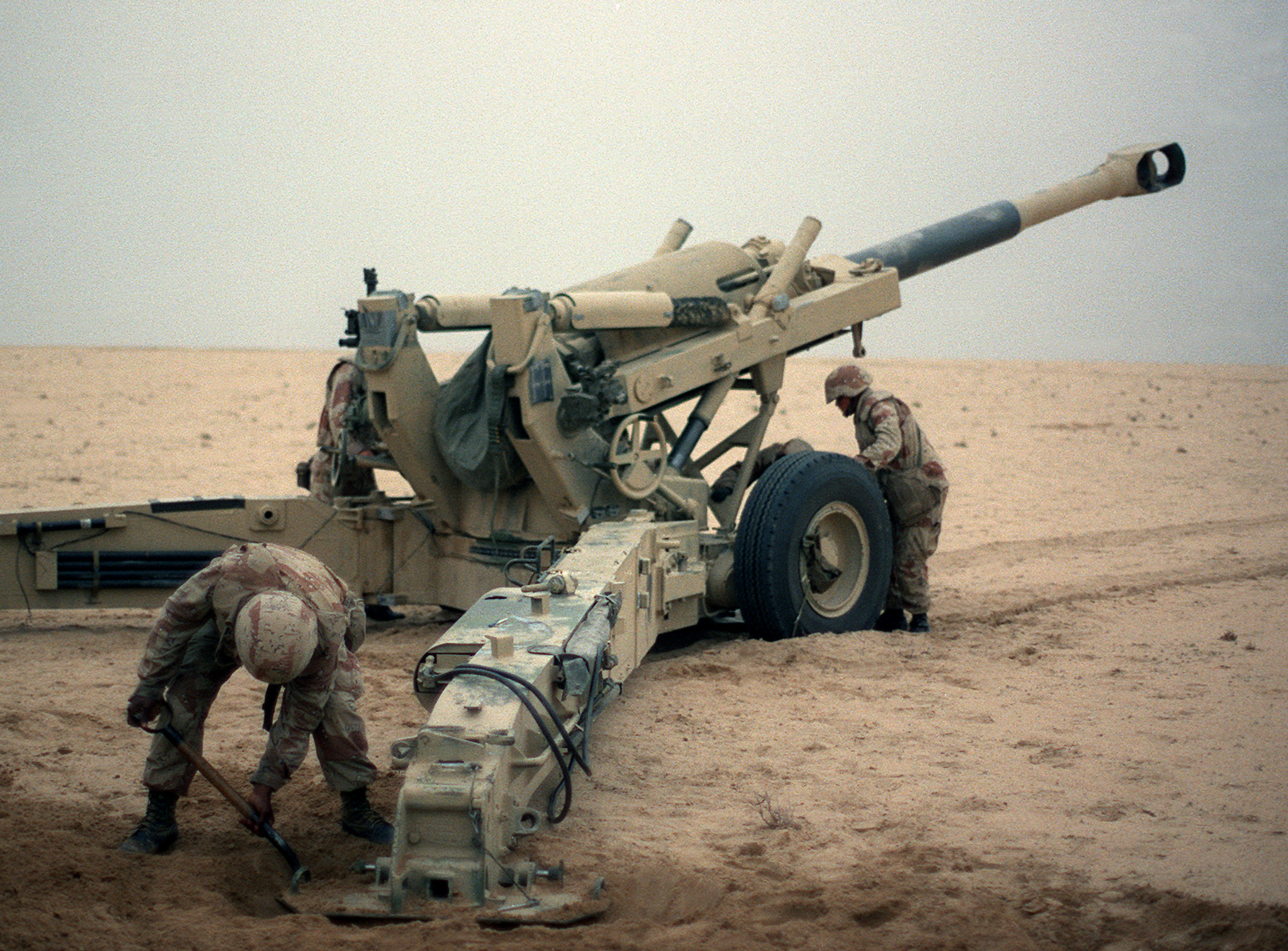
Artillerymen of the US Marine Corps reloading an M198 howitzer during Operation Desert Storm.

- LAV-M Light Armored Vehicle (Mortar) (USMC)
- M106A2 self-propelled mortar carrier
- M109A2/A3/A4 155 mm self-propelled howitzer
- M110A2 8 inch self-propelled howitzer
- M270 Multiple Launch Rocket System
- MGM-140 ATACMS

==== Anti-aircraft ====
- M163 VADS Vulcan Air Defence System
- M48 Chaparral Self-Propelled SAM (Surface-To-Air Missile) Launcher
- M1097 Avenger Humvee
- M167 VADS Vulcan Air Defence System
- MIM-23 Improved Hawk SAM launcher
- FIM-92 Stinger Man-Portable Surface to Air Missile System
- MIM-104 Patriot SAM launcher
- LAV-AD (Light Armored Vehicle-Air Defense) (USMC)

==== Artillery and mortars ====
- M102 105 mm towed howitzer
- M198 155 mm towed howitzer
- M58 MICLIC (Mine Clearing Line Charge) Towed
- M224 60 mm Light Weight Mortar
- M252 81 mm Medium Weight Mortar
- M30 107 mm Heavy Weight Mortar
- 82-BM-37 Mortar mm Infantry Mortar

==== Engineering and recovery vehicles ====
- M728 Combat Engineer Vehicle
- M9 Armored Combat Earthmover
- M60 AVLM (Armored Vehicle Launched MICLIC (Mine-Clearing Line Charge))
- M88A1 Armoured Recovery Vehicle
- M60A1 Armored Vehicle Launched Bridge
- M578 Light Recovery Vehicle (Armoured Recovery Vehicle)
- D7 Caterpillar Armored Bulldozer
- M139 Volcano Mine System

==== Command vehicles ====
- M577A2 ACP (Armored Command Post) Carrier
- AACV7A1 (Assault Amphibian Vehicle Command) (USMC)
- LAV-25C2 Light Armored Vehicle (Command & Control) (USMC)
- M981 FISTV (Fire Support Team Vehicle)

==== Other vehicles ====
- M998 HMMWV Humvee
- M151A2 FAV (Fast Attack Vehicle) (USMC)
- Dodge M882
- M1008 CUCV (Commercial Utility, Cargo Vehicle)
- FAV (Fast Attack Vehicle) / DPV (Desert Patrol Vehicle)
- Kawasaki KLR-250-D8
- M35A2 6×6 2.5-Ton Truck "Deuce And A Half"
- M915 6×4 Army truck medium transportation.
- M915A1 6×4 Army truck medium transportation.
- M925A1 6×6 5-Ton Truck
- M977 HEMTT (Heavy Expanded Mobility Tactical Truck)
- M548 Tracked Cargo Carrier
- M992 FAASV (Field Artillery Ammunition Supply Vehicle)
- M1059 Smoke Generator Carrier
- 1990 Mitsubishi Pajero V6 3.0 4WD (High Military Positions Transport Vehicle)
- Toyota Landcruiser J70 pickup

==== Aircraft ====
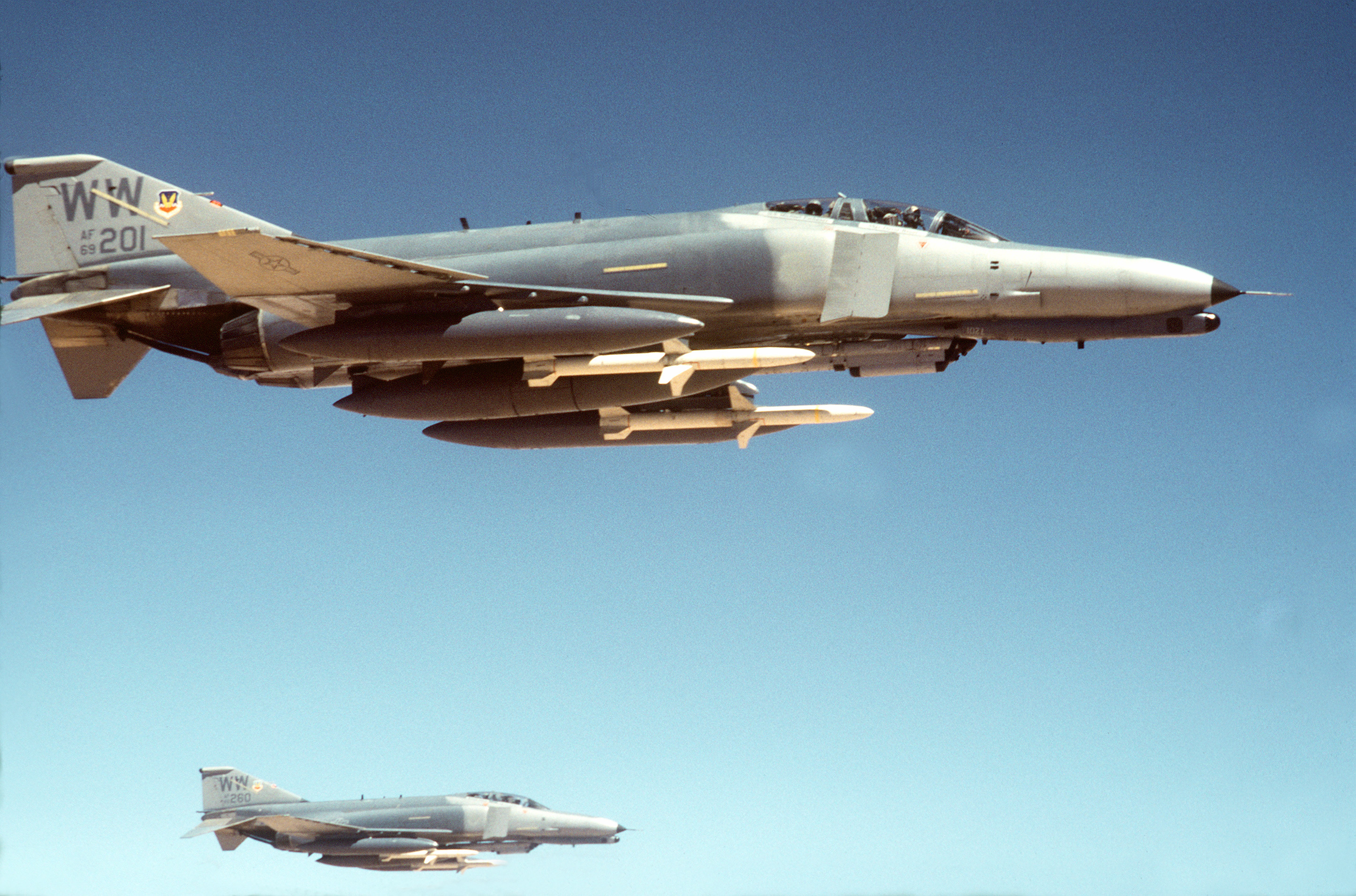
United States Air Force (USAF) F4 Phantom IIs during Operation Desert Shield.

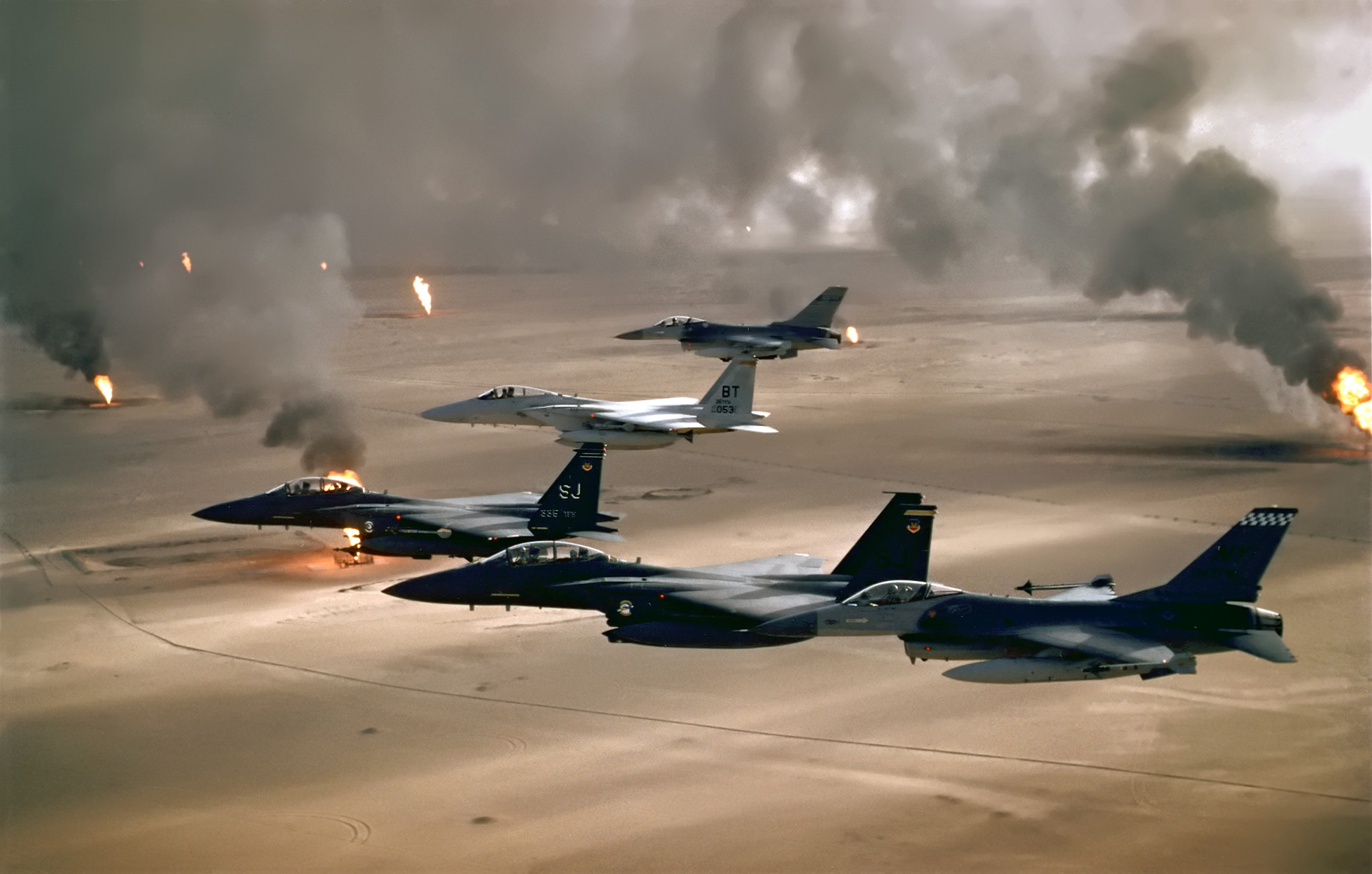
USAF F-16s and F-15s over oil fires set by withdrawing Iraqi forces in Kuwait.

Helicopters

- Bell AH-1F Cobra (Army)
- Bell AH-1J SeaCobra (USMC)
- Bell AH-1T Improved SeaCobra (USMC)
- Bell AH-1W SuperCobra (USMC)
- Boeing AH-64A Apache (Army)
- Boeing CH-46D Sea Knight (USN)
- Boeing CH-46E Sea Knight (USMC)
- Boeing CH-47D Chinook (Army)
- Sikorsky CH-53D Sea Stallion (USN, USMC)
- Sikorsky CH-53E Super Stallion (USMC)
- Bell EH-1H Huey (Iroquois) (Army)
- Sikorsky EH-60A Quick Fix (Army)
- Boeing HH-46D Sea Knight (USN)
- Sikorsky HH-60H Seahawk (USN)
- Boeing MH-47D Chinook Special Operations Aircraft (SOA) (Army)
- Sikorsky MH-53 Pave Low (USAF)
- Sikorsky MH-53E Sea Dragon (USN)
- Sikorsky MH-60G Pave Hawk (USAF)
- Bell OH-58A Kiowa (Army)
- Bell OH-58C Kiowa (Army)
- Bell OH-58D Kiowa (Army)
- Sikorsky RH-53D Sea Stallion (USMC)
- Kaman SH-2F Seasprite (USN)
- Sikorsky SH-3G Sea King (USN)
- Sikorsky SH-3H Sea King (USN)
- Sikorsky SH-60B Seahawk (USN)
- Bell UH-1H Iroquois (Huey) (Army)
- Bell UH-1N (Huey) (USMC)
- Bell UH-1V Iroquois (Huey) Aeromedical Evacuation (Army)
- Boeing UH-46D Sea Knight (USN)
- Sikorsky UH-60A Black Hawk (Army)

Airplanes

- Grumman A-6E TRAM Intruder (USN, USMC)
- Grumman A-6E SWIP Intruder (USN)
- Grumman OV-1D Mohawk (Army)
- LTV A-7E Corsair II (USN)
- BAE/McDonnell Douglas AV-8B Harrier II (USMC)
- Fairchild Republic A-10A Thunderbolt II 'Warthog' (USAF)
- Lockheed AC-130A/H 'Spectre' (USAF)
- Boeing B-52G/H Stratofortress (USAF)
- Grumman C-2A Greyhound (USN)
- Lockheed C-141 Starlifter (USAF)
- Lockheed C-5 Galaxy (USAF)
- McDonnell Douglas C-9B Skytrain II (USN)
- Beechcraft C-12 Huron (USAF)
- Lockheed C-130 Hercules (USAF)
- Lockheed C-130F Hercules (USN)
- North American Rockwell CT-39G (USN)
- McDonnell Douglas DC-9 (USN)
- Grumman E-2C Hawkeye (USN)
- Boeing E-3B Sentry Airborne Warning And Control System (AWACS) (USAF)
- Douglas EA-3B Skywarrior (USN)
- Lockheed EP-3E Aries II (USN)
- Grumman EA-6B Prowler (USN)
- Northrop Grumman E-8 Joint STARS Joint Surveillance Target Attack Radar System (JSTARS) (USAF)
- General Dynamics–Grumman EF-111A Raven (USAF)
- Lockheed EC-130E/J Commando Solo (USAF)
- Lockheed EC-130H Compass Call (USAF)
- Boeing EC-135L Looking Glass (USAF)
- McDonnell Douglas RF-4C Phantom II (USAF)
- McDonnell Douglas F-4G Phantom II (Wild Weasel) (USAF)
- Grumman F-14A Tomcat (USN)
- Grumman F-14A+(B) Tomcat (USN)
- McDonnell Douglas F-15C Eagle (USAF)
- McDonnell Douglas F-15E Strike Eagle (USAF)
- General Dynamics F-16A/C Fighting Falcon (USAF)
- McDonnell Douglas F/A-18A/C Hornet (USN, USMC)
- McDonnell Douglas F/A-18D Hornet (USMC)
- Dynamics F-111E/F Aardvark (USAF)
- Lockheed F-117A Nighthawk (USAF)
- Lockheed HC-130 King (USAF)
- McDonnell Douglas KC-10A Extender (USAF)
- Lockheed KC-130F Hercules (USN, USMC)
- Lockheed KC-130R/T Hercules (USMC)
- Boeing KC-135E/R Stratotanker (USAF)
- Lockheed MC-130E Combat Talon (USAF)
- North American Rockwell OV-10A/D Bronco (USMC)
- North American Rockwell OV-10D+ Bronco (USMC)
- Lockheed P-3B/C Orion (USN)
- Boeing RC-135V/W Rivet Joint (USAF)
- Lockheed S-3A/B Viking (USN)
- Lockheed U-2/TR-1 Dragon Lady (USAF)
- Lockheed UP-3A Orion (USN)

Unmanned aerial vehicles/drones

- Northrop BQM-74 Chukar (USAF)
- AAI RQ-2 Pioneer (USN, USMC, US Army)

Spacecraft

- Defense Support Program
- Defense Satellite Communications System
- Defense Meteorological Satellite Program
- GPS satellite blocks
- Small Lightweight GPS Receiver
- DMSP Rapid Deployment Imaging Terminal

==== Ships ====
Command Ships

- Blue Ridge class (USS Blue Ridge)

Aircraft carriers

- Midway class (USS Midway)
- Forrestal class (USS Saratoga, USS Ranger, USS Independence)
- Kitty Hawk class (USS America, USS John F. Kennedy)
- Nimitz class (USS Theodore Roosevelt, USS Dwight D. Eisenhower)

Battleships

- Iowa class (USS Missouri, USS Wisconsin)

Submarines

- Los Angeles class (USS Chicago, USS Louisville, USS Pittsburgh)

Amphibious assault ships

- Tarawa class (USS Tarawa, USS Nassau)
- Iwo Jima class (USS Iwo Jima, USS Guam, USS Tripoli, USS New Orleans, USS Guadalcanal)

Guided missile cruisers

- Leahy class (USS Worden, USS England, USS Richmond K. Turner, USS Halsey)
- Belknap class (USS Horne, USS Biddle)
- Ticonderoga class (USS Valley Forge, USS Thomas S. Gates, USS Bunker Hill, USS Mobile Bay, USS Leyte Gulf, USS San Jacinto, USS Philippine Sea, USS Princeton, USS Normandy)
- California class (USS South Carolina)
- Virginia class (USS Virginia, USS Mississippi)

Destroyer tenders

- Samuel Gompers class (USS Samuel Gompers)
- Yellowstone class (USS Yellowstone, USS Acadia, USS Cape Cod)

Destroyers

- Spruance class (USS Spruance, USS Paul F. Foster, USS Caron, USS Oldendorf, USS Moosbrugger, USS Leftwich, USS Harry W. Hill, USS Fife)

Guided missile destroyers

- Farragut class (USS Macdonough, USS Coontz, USS Preble)
- Kidd class (USS Kidd)

Frigates

- Knox class (USS Marvin Shields, USS Francis Hammond, USS Vreeland, USS Thomas C. Hart)
- Oliver Hazard Perry class (USS McInerney, USS Jarrett, USS Curts, USS Halyburton, USS Nicholas, USS Hawes, USS Ford, USS Samuel B. Roberts)

Amphibious transport docks

- Raleigh class (USS Raleigh, USS Vancouver)
- Austin class (USS Ogden)
- Cleveland class (USS Denver, USS Juneau, USS Shreveport)
- Trenton class (USS Trenton)

Ammunition ships

- Nitro class (USS Nitro, USS Haleakala)
- Kilauea class (USS Kilauea, USS Santa Barbara, USS Mount Hood, USS Shasta, USS Kiska)

Dock landing ships

- Anchorage class (USS Anchorage, USS Portland, USS Pensacola, USS Mount Vernon)
- Whidbey Island class (USS Germantown, USS Fort McHenry, USS Gunston Hall)

Tank landing ships

- Newport class (USS Manitowoc, USS Peoria, USS Frederick, USS Cayuga, USS Saginaw, USS Spartanburg County, USS La Moure County, USS Barbour County)

Fast sealift ships

- Algol class (USNS Algol, USNS Bellatrix, USNS Denebola, USNS Pollux, USNS Altair, USNS Regulus, USNS Capella)

Fleet oilers

- Neosho class (USNS Neosho, USNS Hassayampa, USNS Ponchatoula)
- Cimarron class (USS Platte)
- Henry J. Kaiser class (USNS Joshua Humphreys, USNS Andrew J. Higgins, USNS Walter S. Diehl)

Combat stores ships

- Mars class (USS Mars, USS Sylvania, USS Niagara Falls, USS San Diego, USS San Jose)
- Sirius class (USNS Sirius, USNS Spica)

Fast combat support ships

- Sacramento class (USS Sacramento, USS Seattle, USS Detroit)

Replenishment oiler ships

- Wichita class (USS Kansas City, USS Kalamazoo)

Minesweepers

- Aggressive class (USS Impervious)

Repair ships

- Vulcan class (USS Vulcan, USS Jason)

Rescue and salvage ships

- Edenton class (USS Beaufort)

Sealift ships

- Wright class (SS Wright, SS Curtiss)

Hospital ships

- Mercy class (USNS Mercy, USNS Comfort)

Amphibious cargo ships

- Charleston class (USS Charleston, USS Durham, USS Mobile)

Mine countermeasure ships

- Avenger class (USS Avenger)

Survey ships

- USNS Chauvenet

Light water craft

- LCU-1610 (Landing Craft Utility)
- LCAC (Landing Craft Air Cushion)

=== United Kingdom ===
Flag of the United Kingdom

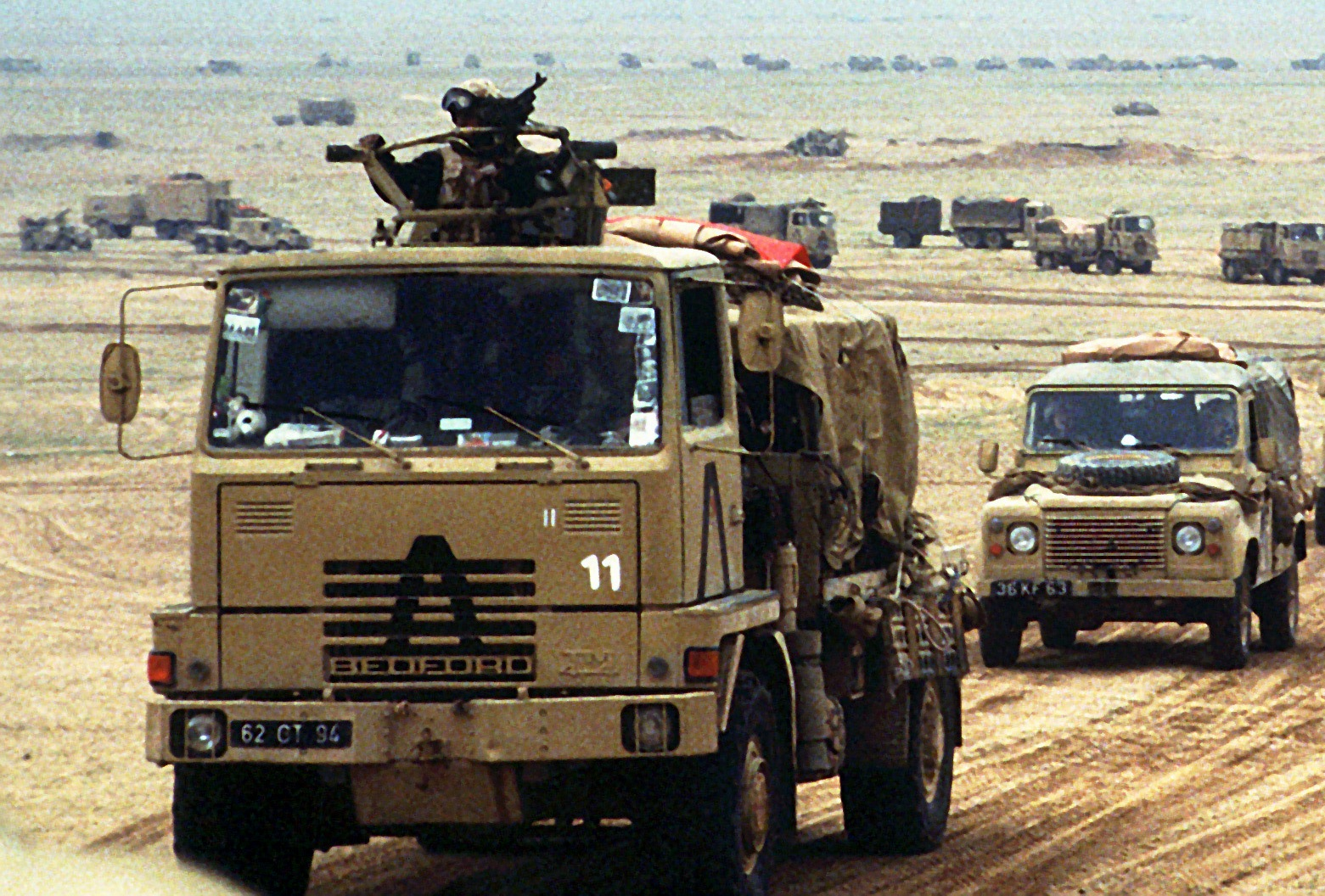
British Army convoy during Operation Desert Storm.

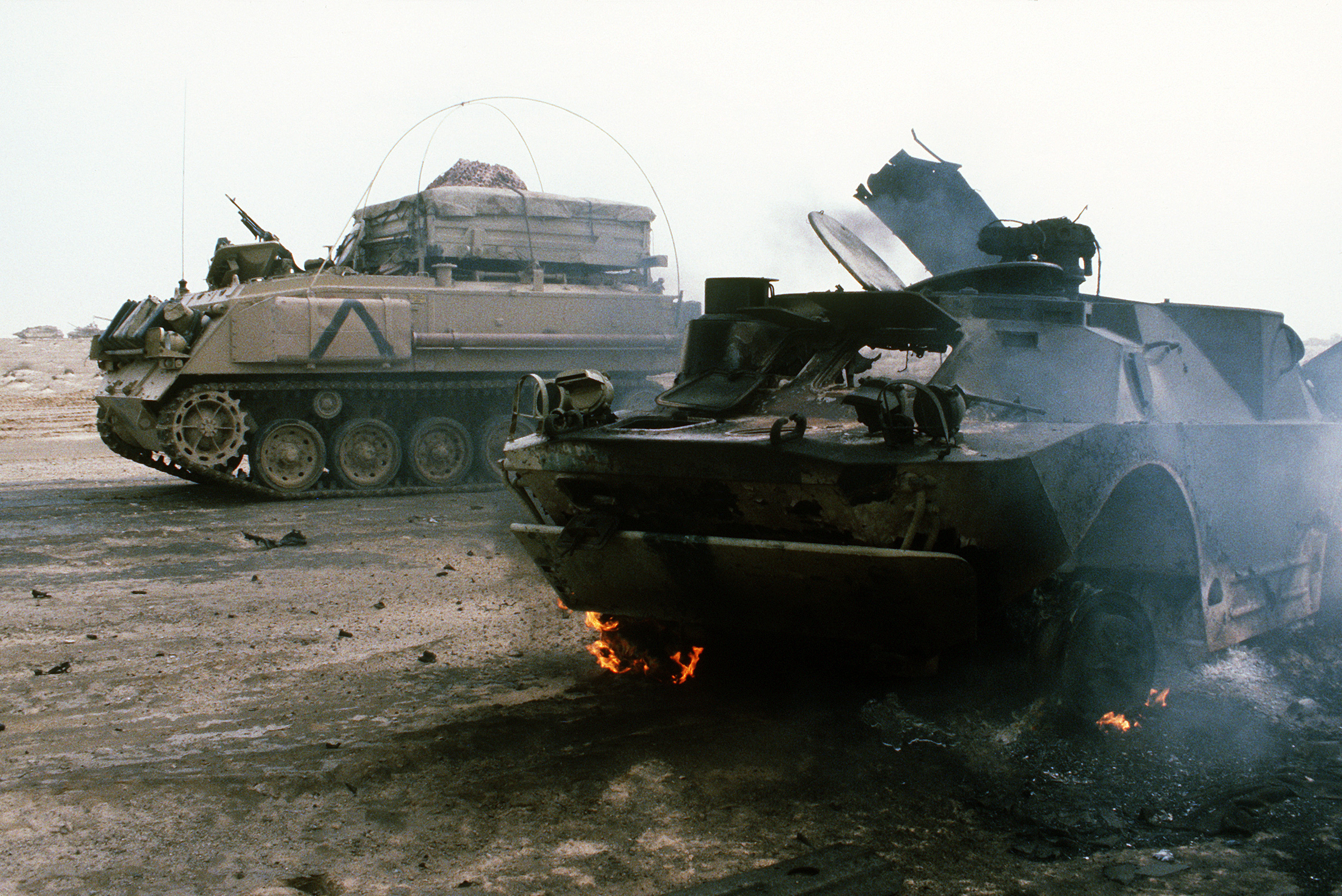
FV432 armoured personnel carrier bypasses a demolished Iraqi BRDM-2.

==== Footwear ====
- BCH boots (Boots, Combat, High) (Worn by British soldiers)

==== Webbing ====
- Pattern 58 webbing (Worn by British soldiers during the Gulf War)

==== Headgear ====
- Mk 6 helmet
- Maroon beret
- Green beret
- Boonie hat

Camouflage patterns

- Disruptive Pattern Material
- Desert Disruptive Pattern Material

Infantry weapons

- L9A1 pistol
- L2A3 submachine gun
- L85A1
- L1A1 Self-Loading Rifle
- Diemaco C7
- L96A1
- L7A1 machine gun
- L1A2 LAW 80

Tanks

- FV4030/4 Challenger main battle tank
- FV4003 Centurion Mk.5 AVRE 165 (Armoured Vehicle Royal Engineers)
- FV4201 Chieftain AVRE

Armoured vehicles

- FV101 Scorpion armoured reconnaissance vehicle
- FV102 Striker anti-tank guided missile carrier
- FV103 Spartan armoured personnel carrier
- FV104 Samaritan armoured ambulance
- FV107 Scimitar armoured reconnaissance vehicle
- FV432 armoured personnel carrier
- FV432 armoured ambulance
- FV510 Warrior infantry fighting vehicle
- Ferret armoured car
- TPz Fuchs APC NBC and EW variants (UOR acquisition from Germany)

Self-propelled artillery/mortars/rockets

- FV432(M) Trojan self-propelled mortar carrier
- M109 155 mm self-propelled howitzer
- M110 8 inch self-propelled howitzer
- M270 Multiple Launch Rocket System

Anti-aircraft

- Rapier Field Standard B1(M) Stationary SAM launcher
- Rapier Field Standard B2 Stationary Surface-To-Air Missile Launcher
- Tracked Rapier mobile SAM launcher
- Javelin Lightweight Multiple Launcher surface-to-air missile launcher

Artillery and Mortars

- L118 105 mm Light Gun
- 51 mm Light Mortar
- L16A1 81 mm Mortar
- FV514 Mechanised Artillery Observation Vehicle

Engineering and recovery vehicles

- FV4205 Chieftain AVLB - armoured vehicle launched bridge
- FV180 Combat Engineer Tractor
- FV106 Samson armoured recovery vehicle (ARV)
- FV434 ARV
- FV512 Warrior Mechanised Combat Repair Vehicle
- FV513 Warrior Mechanised Recovery Vehicle (Repair)
- Chieftain Armoured Repair and Recovery Vehicle (CHARRV)

Command vehicles

- FV105 Sultan

Other vehicles

- Land Rover Defender
- Land Rover Series III 109"
- Leyland 4×4 4-Tonne Lorry
- Bedford 4×4 8-Tonne Lorry
- Mercedes Unimog Support Vehicle
- FV620 Stalwart Amphibious Truck
- Harley Davidson MT350E
- Scammell Commander (TK/TPTR) Tank Transporter
- Scammell Crusader (AVLB) Bridge Transporter
- Scammell S26 Self Loading Dump Truck
- Armstrong 500
- Leyland DROPs (Demountable Rack Off Pickup System)
- M548 Tracked Cargo Carrier
- Giant Viper mine-clearing system

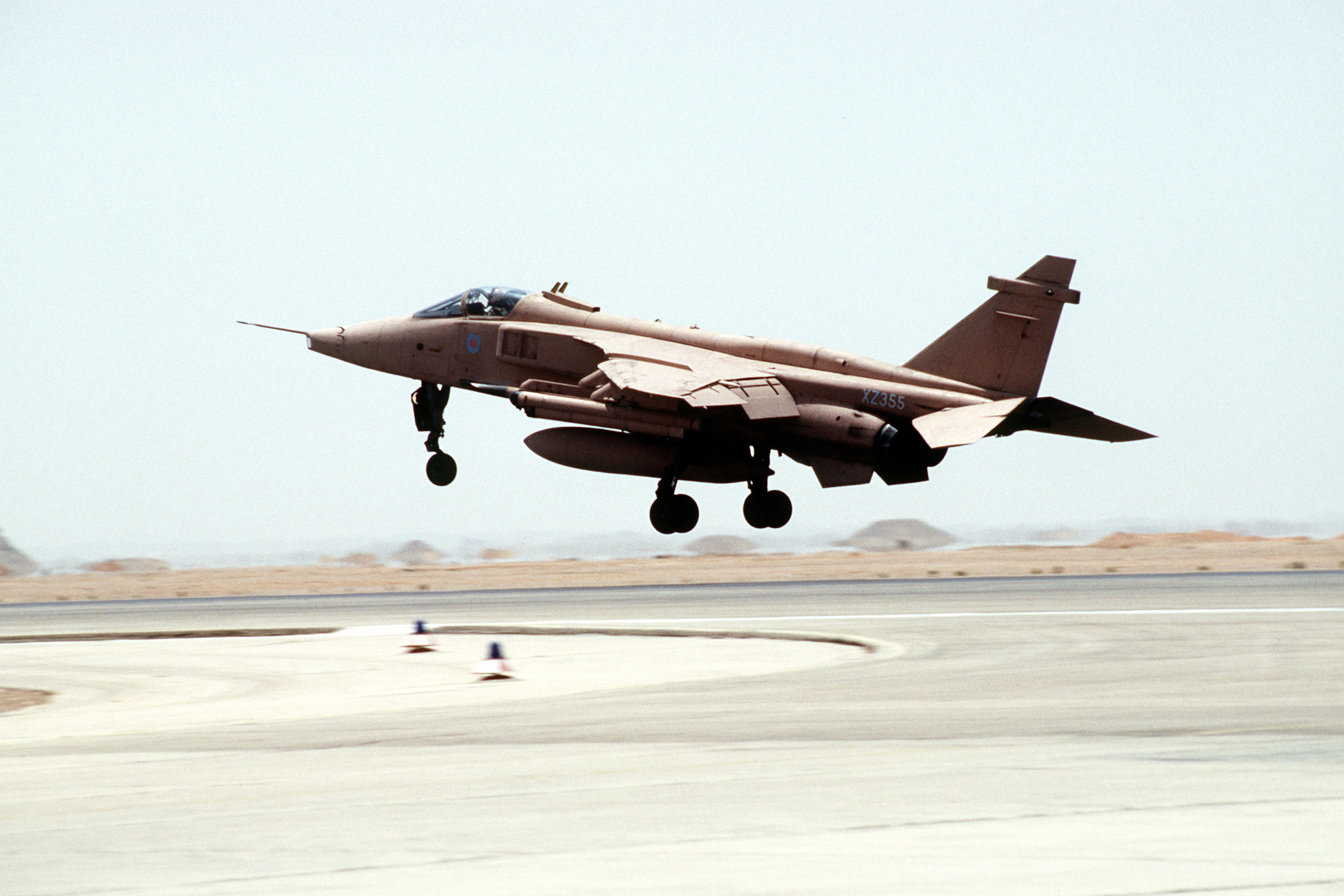
Royal Air Force SEPECAT Jaguar on takeoff, January 1991.

==== Aircraft ====
===== Rotary-wing =====
- Aérospatiale-Westland Gazelle AH.1 (AAC)
- Westland Lynx AH.1 (AAC)
- Westland Lynx AH.7 (AAC)
- Westland Lynx HAS.3 (RN)
- Boeing Chinook HC.1B (RAF)
- Westland Sea King HC.4/HAS.5 (RN)
- Westland Puma HC.1 (RAF)

===== Fixed-wing =====
- McDonnell Douglas Phantom FGR.2
- Panavia Tornado GR.1 (RAF) IDS (Interdictor/Strike)
- SEPECAT Jaguar GR.1A (RAF)
- Panavia Tornado F.3 (RAF) ADV (Air Defence Variant)
- Blackburn Buccaneer S.2B (RAF)
- BAe Nimrod MR.2P (RAF)
- BAe Nimrod R.1 (RAF)
- Britten-Norman Islander AL.1 (RAF)
- Handley Page Victor K.2 (RAF)
- Lockheed Tristar (RAF)
- Lockheed Hercules C.1 (RAF)
- Lockheed Hercules C.3 (RAF)
- Vickers VC10 C.1 (RAF)
- Vickers VC10 K.2 (RAF)
- Vickers VC10 K.3 (RAF)

==== Ships ====
Aircraft carrier

- Invincible class (HMS Ark Royal)

Frigates

- Leander class (HMS Jupiter)
- Broadsword class (HMS Battleaxe, HMS Brazen, HMS London HMS Sheffield)

Destroyers

- Type 42 destroyer (HMS Cardiff, HMS Exeter, HMS Manchester, HMS Gloucester, HMS York)

Support ships

- Hecla class (HMS Herald, HMS Hecla)

Submarines

- Oberon class (HMS Opossum, HMS Otus)

Fleet support tankers

- RFA Orangeleaf

Fast fleet tankers

- RFA Olna
- RFA Olmeda

Stores ships

- RFA Regent
- RFA Fort Grange

Landing Ship Logistics

- RFA Sir Bedivere
- RFA Sir Galahad
- RFA Sir Percivale
- RFA Sir Tristram

Mine countermeasure vessels

- Hunt class (HMS Ledbury, HMS Cattistock, HMS Dulverton, HMS Bicester, HMS Atherstone, HMS Hurworth)

Primary casualty reception vessels

- RFA Argus

Fleet repair ships

- RFA Diligence

=== Kuwait/Free Kuwait ===
Flag of Kuwait

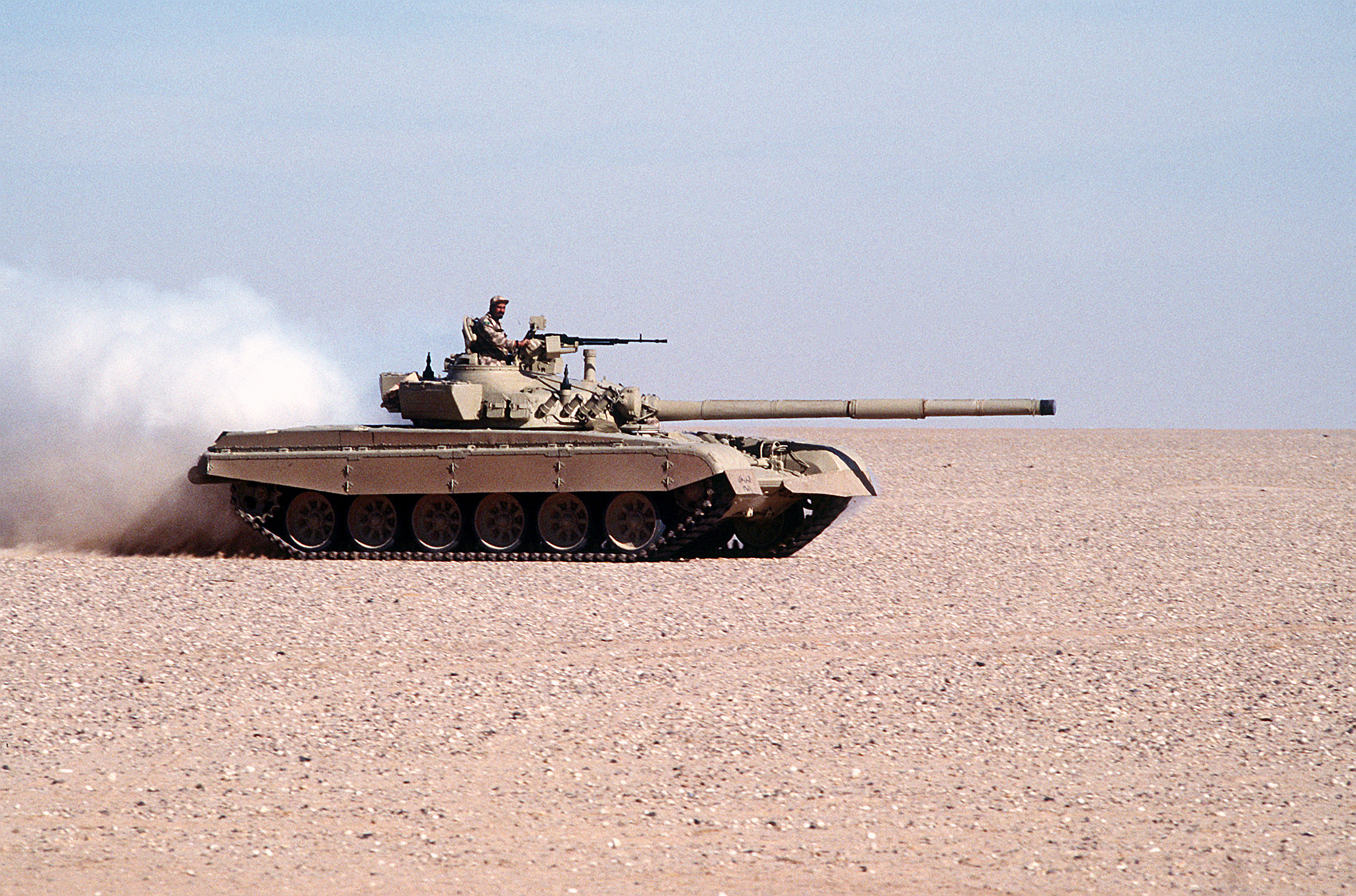
Kuwaiti M-84 tank advances during Operation Desert Shield.

==== Webbing ====
- ALICE (all-purpose lightweight individual carrying equipment) (US-supplied ALICE webbing used by Kuwaiti soldiers)

==== Helmets ====
- M1 helmet (Worn by Kuwaiti soldiers and often with 6 colour desert camo cover)

==== Combat uniforms ====
- Desert Disruptive Pattern Material
- Disruptive Pattern Material
- Desert Battle Dress Uniform
- Battle Dress Uniform

==== Footwear ====
- Sneakers (used by Kuwaiti soldiers and wearing brands like Adidas due to lack of their own desert combat boots)
- British Boots Combat (BCH boots supplied by the British and used by Kuwaiti soldiers)
- Desert combat boot (supplied by coalition aid partners and used by Kuwaiti soldiers)

Infantry weapons

- Browning Hi-Power
- MP5A3
- MP5K
- M16A1
- M16A2
- FN FAL
- HK G3A3/A4

==== Machine guns ====
- M2 Browning

Tanks

- Chieftain MBT (Main Battle Tank)
- M-84AB MBT (Main Battle Tank)

Armoured vehicles

- BMP-2 IFV (Infantry Fighting Vehicle)
- M113A1 APC (Armored Personnel Carrier)
- FV601 Saladin (Armoured Car)

==== Fast attack craft ====
- Lürssen FPB-57 (unknown number)
- Lürssen TNC-45 (unknown number)

==== Aircraft ====
Helicopters

- Aérospatiale SA.342 Gazelle

Airplanes

- Dassault Mirage F1CK (KAF)
- McDonnell Douglas A-4KU Skyhawk (KAF)

=== France ===
Flag of France

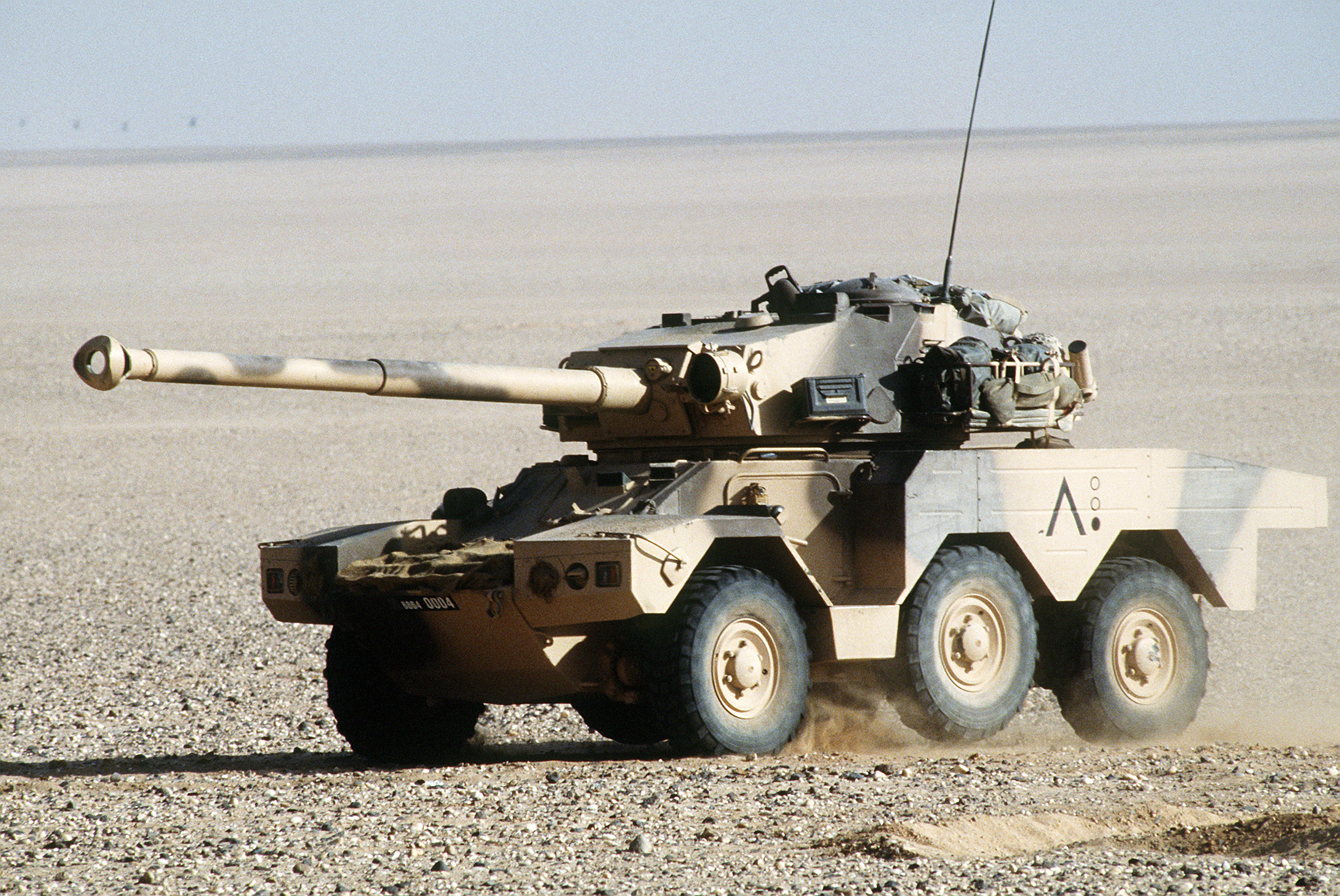
French ERC 90 Sagaie during Operation Desert Shield.

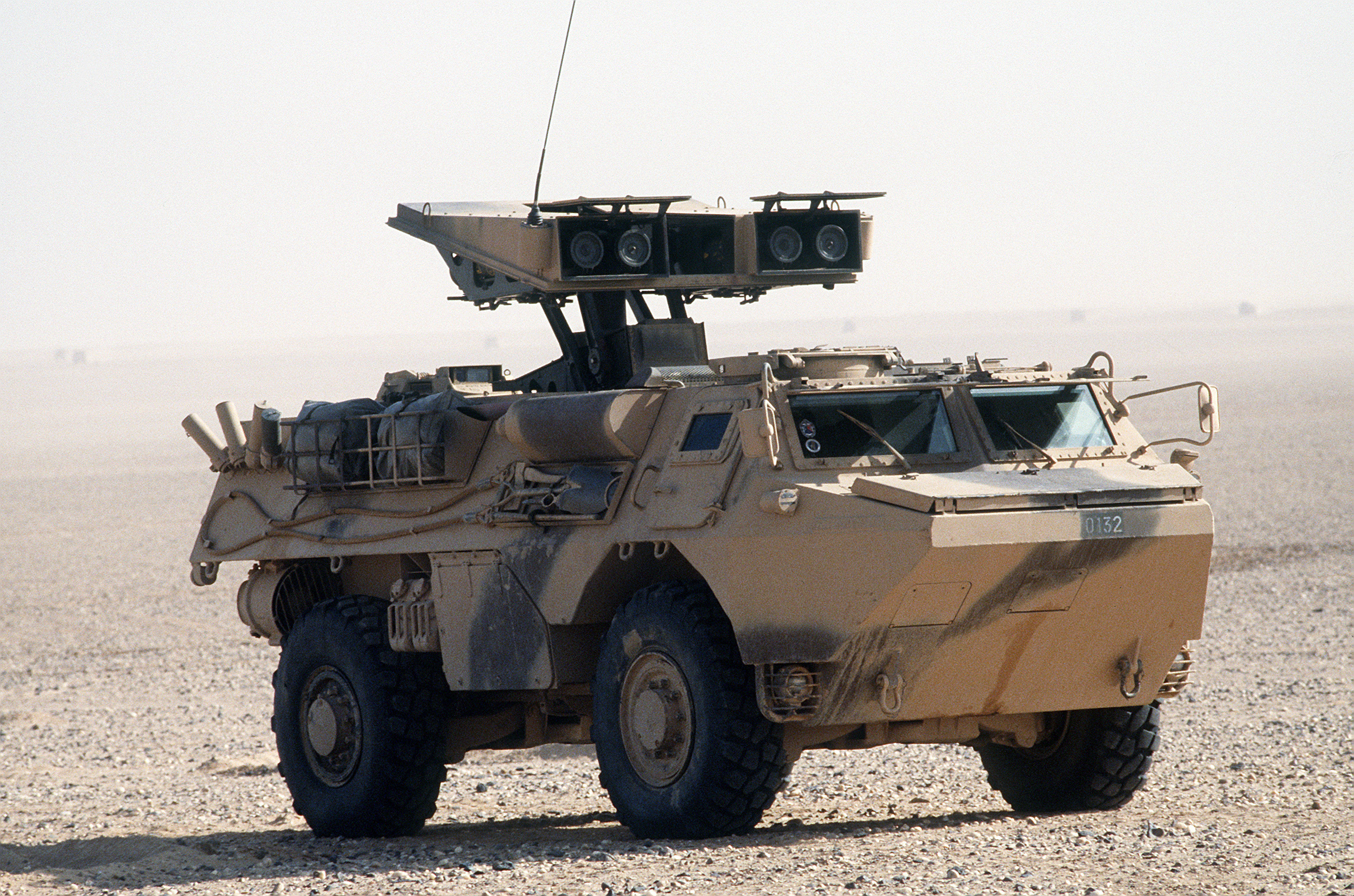
French VCAC (VAB) Mephisto anti-tank missile system.

==== Headgear ====
- Modèle 1978 helmet

Camouflage patterns

- Camouflage Daguet

Infantry weapons

- PAMAS-G1
- MAC Mle 1950
- FAMAS
- Heckler & Koch MP5
- M16A2
- AA-52
- LRAC F1
- FR F1

Tanks

- AMX-30B2 MBT (Main Battle Tank)

Armoured vehicles

- AMX-10RC Armoured Car
- AMX-10P Infantry Fighting Vehicle
- Panhard AML-90 Armoured Car
- Panhard ERC-90F4 Sagaie Armoured Car
- VAB (Véhicule de l'Avant Blindé)
- VAB-VCAC/HOT (Véhicule de l'Avant Blindé) ATGM (Anti-Tank Guided Missile) Launching Vehicle
- VAB-VTM (Véhicule de l'Avant Blindé) Mortar Tractor

Artillery and mortars

- TRF1 155 mm Towed Howitzer
- MO-81-61C 81 mm Mortar
- MO-120-RT-61 120 mm Mortar

Command vehicles

- VAB-PC (Véhicule de l'Avant Blindé) (Command)

Anti-aircraft

- GIAT 20 mm 53T2 Towed AAA (Anti-Aircraft Artillery)
- Mistral SAM (Surface-To-Air Missile) Launcher

Other vehicles

- Peugeot P4 4WD car
- ACMAT VLRA (Véhicule Léger de Reconnaissance et d’Appui) 4WD truck

==== Aircraft ====
Helicopters

- Aérospatiale SA-342 Gazelle
- Aérospatiale SA-330 Puma
- Aérospatiale Super Frelon (Aéronavale)

Airplanes

- Dassault Mirage F1C-200 (AdA)
- Dassault Mirage 2000 (AdA)
- SEPECAT Jaguar A (AdA)
- Dassault Super Étendard

==== Ships ====
Aircraft carriers

- French aircraft carrier Clemenceau

==== Amphibious transport docks ====
- Foudre class (Foudre)

==== Cruisers ====
- Colbert class (Colbert)

==== Destroyers ====
- Georges Leygues class (Jean de Vienne, Latouche-Tréville, Dupleix, Montcalm, Lamotte-Picquet)
- T 47 class (Du Chayla)

==== Corvettes ====
- D'Estienne d'Orves class (Premier maître l'Her)

==== Minehunters ====
- Tripartite-class minehunters, L'Aigle, Cassiopee, Orion, Pluton, Sagittaire

==== Replenishment ships ====
- Durance class (Durance, Var)

==== Support ships ====
- Loire-class mine countermeasures support ship, Loire

=== Qatar ===
Flag of Qatar

==== Land-based ====
Infantry weapons

- FN FAL
- FN MAG

Tanks

- AMX-30S MBT (Main Battle Tank)

Armoured vehicles

- GIAT VAB (Véhicule de l'Avant Blindé)
- GIAT VAB-VCAC/HOT (Véhicule de l'Avant Blindé) ATGM (Anti-Tank Guided Missile) Launching Vehicle

==== Aircraft ====
- Dassault Mirage F1EDA

=== United Arab Emirates ===
Flag of United Arab Emirates

==== Land-based ====
Infantry weapons

- FN FAL
- M16A2
- FN MAG

==== Aircraft ====
- Dassault Mirage 2000

=== Saudi Arabia ===
Flag of Saudi Arabia

==== Webbing ====
- ALICE (all-purpose lightweight individual carrying equipment)

==== Headgear ====
- M1 helmet (worn by Saudi Arabian soldiers with the Mitchell "clouds" pattern camouflage covers)
- Beret

Combat uniforms

- Battle Dress Uniform
- Desert Battle Dress Uniform
- Desert Disruptive Pattern Material

Infantry weapons

- Browning Hi-Power
- Steyr MPi 69
- FN FAL
- MP5A3
- Heckler & Koch G3
- Steyr AUG
- M16A2
- MG 3
- M67 recoilless rifle

Tank

- AMX-30S MBT (Main Battle Tank)
- M60A3 TTS MBT (Main Battle Tank)

Armoured vehicles

- M113A1 APC (Armored Personnel Carrier)
- V-150
- Pegaso BMR
- VCC-1 TOW
- M2A2 Bradley IFV (Infantry Fighting Vehicle)
- AMX-10P IFV (Infantry Fighting Vehicle)
- AMX/HOT ATGM (Anti-Tank Guided Missile) Launcher
- Panhard AML-60 Armoured Car
- Panhard AML-90 Armoured Car
- Engesa EE-11 Urutu APC (Armored Personnel Carrier)
- Panhard M3 VTT APC (Armored Personnel Carrier)
- Cadillac Gage V-150 Commando
- Cadillac Gage V-150 Commando (Imp. TOW)

Anti-aircraft

- M163 VADS Vulcan Air Defence System

Engineering and recovery vehicles

- M728 CEV (Combat Engineer Vehicle)

Other vehicles

- M151 Truck, Utility, 1/4-Ton, 4×4
- M35 series 2½-ton 6×6 cargo truck

Self-propelled artillery/mortars/rockets

- M109A2 155 mm SPH (Self-Propelled Howitzer)
- AMX-GCT 155 mm SPH (Self-Propelled Howitzer)
- Astros II MLRS
- M106A2 Self-Propelled Mortar Carrier
- Cadillac Gage V-150 Commando (Mortar 81 mm)
- Cadillac Gage V-150 Commando (Mortar 90 mm)

Artillery and mortars

- M252 81 mm Medium Weight Mortar
- M102 105 mm Towed Howitzer
- M198 155 mm Towed Howitzer
- M30 107 mm Heavy Weight Mortar
- M56 105 mm Towed Howitzer

Anti-Aircraft

- M163 VADS Vulcan Air Defence System
- AMX-30SA Shahine Self-Propelled SAM (Surface-To-Air Missile) Launcher
- AMX-30SA SPAAA (Self-Propelled Anti-Aircraft Artillery)
- MIM-23 Improved Hawk SAM (Surface-To-Air Missile) Launcher
- Shahine Stationary SAM (Surface-To-Air Missile) Launcher
- Bofors 40 mm L/70 AAA (Anti-Aircraft Artillery)
- Oerlikon-Buhrle Twin 35 mm GDF AAA (Anti-Aircraft Artillery)

==== Other vehicles ====
- Land Rover Defender

=== Aircraft ===
Helicopters

- UH-60 (RSLF)
- Agusta-Bell 205 Iroquois (RSAF)
- Agusta-Bell 206 Jet Ranger (RSAF)
- Agusta-Bell 212 Agusta (RSAF)
- Kawasaki KV-107 (RSAF)
- Eurocopter AS-365N Dauphin (Navy)
- Eurocopter AS-332B Super Puma (Navy)

Airplanes

- Lockheed C-130E Hercules (RSAF)
- Lockheed C-130H Hercules (RSAF)
- Boeing E-3A Sentry AWACS Airborne Warning And Control System (RSAF)
- Northrop F-5E Tiger II (RSAF)
- McDonnell Douglas F-15C Eagle (RSAF)
- Lockheed KC-130H (RSAF)
- Northrop RF-5E Tigereye (RSAF)
- Panavia Tornado IDS Interdictor/Strike (RSAF)
- Panavia Tornado ADV Air Defence Variant (RSAF)

==== Frigates ====
- Al Madinah class (Al Madinah, Hofouf, Abha, Taif)

==== Corvettes ====
- Badr class (Badr, Al Yarmook, Hitteen, Tabuk)

==== Patrol ships ====
- Al Sadiq class (Al-Siddiq, Al-Farouq, Abdul-Aziz, Faisal, Khalid, Amr, Tariq, Ouqbah, Abu Obadiah)

==== Replenishment ships ====
- Boraida class (Boraida, Yunbou)

=== Egypt ===
Flag of Egypt

==== Headgear ====
- SSh-68
- SSh-60
- Hełm wz. 67 (exported heavily to Egypt during the 70s and 80s and used in the Gulf War)

==== Combat uniforms and camouflage ====
- Battle Dress Uniform
- Desert Battle Dress Uniform
- Cold Weather field jacket (M65) (Used by Egyptian forces in solid olive drab colour)
- Egyptian desert pattern (scrambled eggs)
- "No-green" desert pattern (A short-lived camo that was caused by a printing mistake)

Infantry weapons

- Helwan
- Carl Gustav M45
- AK-47
- AKM
- Misr assault rifle
- FN MAG
- PKM
- RPG-7

Tank

- M60A3 TTS MBT (Main Battle Tank)

Armoured vehicles

- M113A2 APC (Armored Personnel Carrier)
- Pegaso BMR

Anti-aircraft

- 9K32 Strela-2
- ZSU-23-4 Shilka (self-propelled anti-aircraft gun)

Engineering and recovery vehicles

- M88A1 recovery vehicle

Other vehicles

- Jeep YJ
- M151 Truck, Utility, 1/4-Ton, 4×4

Self-propelled artillery/mortars/rockets

- M109A2 155 mm SPH (Self-Propelled Howitzer)

=== Italy ===
Flag of Italy

Infantry weapons

- Beretta BM 59
- Beretta AR70/90
- Beretta 92
- Beretta M12
- Benelli M3 Super 90
- Heckler & Koch G3
- Sako TRG
- FN Minimi

==== Aircraft ====
- 8 Panavia Tornado IDS Interdictor/Strike

==== Ships ====
- 1 Audace-class destroyer (Audace)
- 3 Lupo-class frigates (Orsa, Lupo, Sagittario)
- 2 Maestrale-class frigates (Zeffiro, Libeccio)
- 1 San Giorgio-class amphibious transport dock (San Marco)
- 2 Stromboli-class replenishment oiler (Vesuvio, Stromboli)

=== Poland ===
==== Hospital ship ====
- ORP Wodnik

==== Salvage ship ====
- ORP Piast

=== Czechoslovakia ===
Flag of Czechoslovakia (1945-1992)

==== Combat uniform ====
- vz. 85 uniform (Standard solid grey-green utility uniform)

==== Headgear ====
- Maroon beret (used by Czechoslovak Airborne troops)
- Přilba vz. 53 (worn by most Czechoslovak soldiers)

==== Infantry weapons ====
- Sa vz. 58
- UK vz. 59

==== Other vehicles ====
- Tatra T-815 (Heavy truck)
- UAZ-4629 (All-terrain vehicle mounted with chemical reconnaissance probes)
- ARS-12M (De-contamination truck based on Praga V3S)
- POP (Mobile field medical truck based on Praga V3S)

=== Canada ===
Flag of Canada

==== Webbing ====
- 1982 Pattern Webbing (Olive drab nylon webbing used by Canadian soldiers)

==== Combat uniform ====
- Canadian OG-107 Mk II (Canadian-designed olive drab colour with Chest mag pockets)

==== Headgear ====
- Green beret (worn by Canadian soldiers during the Gulf War)

Infantry weapons

- Browning Hi Power (Made locally as Inglis Hi Power)
- Heckler & Koch MP5
- Diemaco C7
- C8SFW
- FN MAG (FN C6 MAG)
- C3A1
- M2 Browning

==== Aircraft ====
- McDonnell Douglas CF-18 Hornet

==== Transport aircraft ====
- 27 CC-130 Hercules
- 5 CC-137 (Boeing 707)

==== Helicopters ====
- 5 Sikorsky CH-124 Sea King

==== Patrol, surveillance aircraft ====
- 1 CC-144 Challenger

==== Ships ====
- HMCS Protecteur
- HMCS Terra Nova (Restigouche class)
- HMCS Athabaskan (Iroquois class)

=== Bahrain ===
Flag of Bahrain (1972–2002)

==== Land-based ====
Infantry weapons

- Browning Hi-Power
- FN FAL

Tank

- M60A3 TTS MBT (Main Battle Tank)

Other vehicles

- Mercedes-Benz NG

Aircraft

- Bell 212

Ships

- BNS Al Jarim (FPB 30)
- BNS Al Jabiri (FPB-21)

=== Belgium ===
Flag of Belgium

Infantry weapons

- Browning Hi Power
- FN FNC
- FN FAL
- FN MAG
- FN Minimi

Aircraft

- Dassault Mirage 5

Ships

==== Frigates ====
- Wielingen-class frigates, Wielingen, Wandelaar

==== Minehunters ====
- Tripartite-class minehunters Myosotis, Iris, Dianthus

==== Support ships ====
- Zinnia-class support ship, Zinnia

=== Sweden ===
Flag of Sweden

Infantry weapons

- Pist 88
- Ak 4
- Ak 5
- Ksp 58
- Heckler & Koch PSG-1

=== Morocco ===
Flag of Morocco

==== Headgear ====
- M1 helmet (worn by Royal Moroccan soldiers with helmet nets)

Infantry weapons

- PM md. 63

Other vehicles

- Mercedes-Benz Unimog 404
- M151A2 MUTT
- Land Cruiser J40

==== Aircraft ====
- Lockheed C-130H Hercules

=== Niger ===
Flag of Niger

==== Land-based ====
M-1956 load-carrying equipment (Worn by Nigerien soldiers with the belts being Davis T-slot quick-release buckle)

==== Headgear ====
- M1 helmet (worn by Nigerien soldiers with Mitchell "clouds" pattern camouflage covers)

Combat uniforms

- Desert Battle Dress Uniform

Infantry weapons

- MP5A3
- M14 rifle

Armoured vehicles

- Panhard AML-60
- Panhard AML-90

=== Syria ===
Flag of Ba'athist Syria (1980–2024)

==== Uniforms ====
- OP-1M protective suit (Soviet-designed NBC suit used by Syrian soldiers)

==== Headgear ====
- Hełm wz. 50 (worn by Syrian soldiers, some with helmet nets)
- Patrol cap (worn by Syrian commanders and officers when not in the combat zone)

Infantry weapons

- Browning Hi-Power
- Makarov Pistol
- Tokarev TT-33
- AK-47
- AKM
- AK-74
- MPi-KM
- Type 56 assault rifle
- PKM
- RPD
- SVD Dragunov
- RPG-7

Tank

- T-62 MBT (Main Battle Tank)

Other vehicles

- TAM 150 T11 B/BV

=== Argentina ===
Flag of Argentina

==== Destroyers ====
- 1 MEKO 360 (Almirante Brown class): ARA Almirante Brown (D-10) (CF A. Tierno). ARA Almirante Brown navigated 25.000 NM in the designated area for operations, as part of GT 88, together with ARA Spiro. Returned to Argentina on 25 April 1991.

==== Frigates ====
- 2 MEKO 140 A16 (Espora class): ARA Spiro (P-43) (CF O. Gonzalez), ARA Rosales (P-42) (CC Tebaldi / CC Rossi). ARA Spiro returned to Argentina on 23 May 1991, together with ARA Almirante Brown (D-10). It had navigated 23000 NM in the operations area during the conflict.

==== Amphibious cargo ships ====
- 1Costa Sur class: ARA Bahia San Blas (B-5). Loaded with medicine and food, for humanitarian aid. This ship along with ARA Rosales (P-42) formed GT 88.1, and replaced GT 88.0 formed by ARA Almirante Brown and ARA Spiro.

==== Helicopters ====
- 2 Alouette III (3-H-109 and 3-H-112), from 1° Esc. Aeronaval de Helicopteros (EA1H) (C.C. Alomar). Totalling 67 flights. Operated initially with P-43 and D-10. One of the Alouettes suffered an accident, with no casualties.

==== Transport aircraft ====
- 2 Boeing 707 (TC-91 and TC-94/LV-LGO as UN UNAG-1)

=== Australia ===
==== Destroyers ====
- Perth class (Brisbane)

==== Frigates ====
- Adelaide class (Adelaide, Darwin, Sydney, Canberra)

==== Replenishment ships ====
- Durance class (Success)
- Leaf class (Westralia)

==== Transport aircraft ====
- 1 Boeing 707
- 4 Lockheed C-130 Hercules

=== Norway ===
==== Patrol ships ====
- Nordkapp-class offshore patrol vessel, NoCGV Andenes

=== Denmark ===
==== Corvettes ====
- Niels Juel-class corvette, HDMS Olfert Fischer

=== Greece ===
==== Frigates ====
- Elli-class frigate, HS Elli

=== Spain ===
==== Destroyers ====
- Gearing-class destroyer, Noa (DD-841)

==== Frigates ====
- Santa María-class frigate, Santa María

==== Corvettes ====
- Descubierta-class corvettes, Descubierta, Diana, Infanta Cristina, Cazadora, Vencedora

=== Netherlands ===
==== Frigates ====
- Kortenaer-class frigates, HNLMS Pieter Florisz, HNLMS Philips van Almonde
- Jacob van Heemskerck-class frigates, HNLMS Witte de With, HNLMS Jacob van Heemskerck

==== Minehunters ====
- Tripartite-class minehunters, HNLMS Harlingen, HNLMS Haarlem, HNLMS Zierikzee

==== Replenishment ships ====
- Zuiderkruis-class replenishment oiler, HNLMS Zuiderkruis

==== Maritime patrol aircraft ====
- Two P-3C Orions

=== Turkey ===
==== Destroyers ====
- Gearing-class destroyer, TCG Yucetepe

== Iraq ==
Flag of Iraq (1963–1991)

=== Iraq ===
List of substantial numbers of various military equipment in Iraq's possession from around 1970 onwards. (Not a guarantee that all were used in combat or in theatre during the war.)

==== Headgear ====
- Black beret (worn by both regular army and Republican Guard soldiers)
- Iraqi M80 helmet (made from the exported South Korean Bangtan Helmet)

Combat uniforms

- Disruptive Pattern Material (Supplied by the British from the Iran-Iraq War)
- Lizard camouflage (Acquired from European suppliers from the 80s and worn by elite Iraqi units)
- ERDL pattern (Locally manufactured copies of the American ERDL and it is nicknamed "Iraqi ERDL")

Infantry weapons

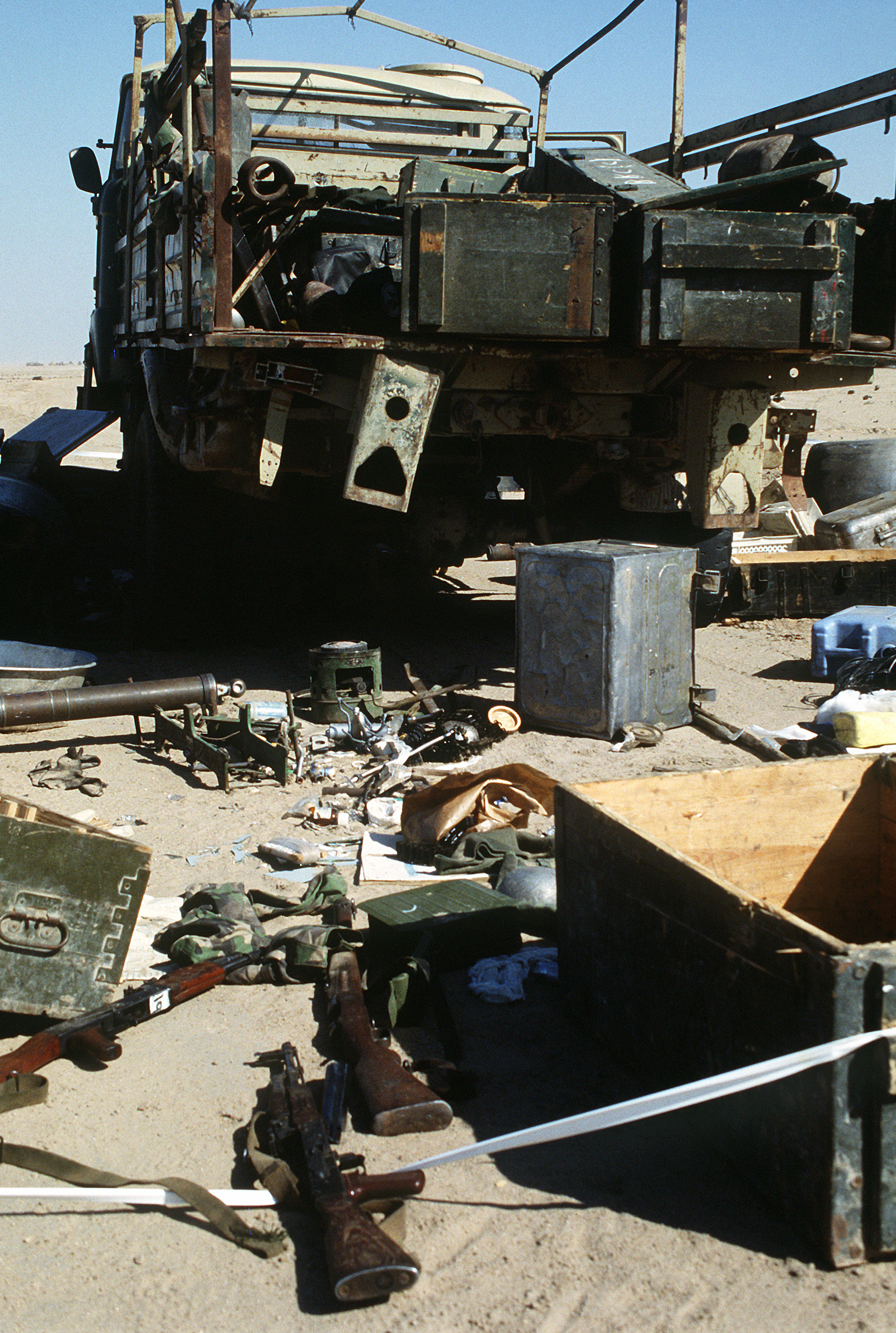
The contents of an Iraqi transport truck (IFA W50) looted and strewn on the road after Iraqi forces retreated from the desert, north of Kuwait City, during Operation Desert Storm.

Handgun

- TT pistol
- CZ-75
- Tariq
- Browning Hi-Power
- Beretta Model 1951
- Makarov pistol
- FEG PA-63

Submachine Gun

- PM-63 RAK
- PM-84
- PPSh-41
- PPS-43
- vz.61 Skorpion
- Heckler & Koch MP5
- Sterling submachine gun

Rifle

- Mauser Karabiner 98k
- Lee-Enfield
- Mosin-Nagant M1891
- M1917 Enfield
- Automatgevär m/42
- SKS

Assault Rifle

- AK-47
- AKS-47
- AKM
- AKMS
- AK-63
- AK-74
- AKS-74U
- PM md. 63
- MPi-KM
- Type 56 assault rifle
- Type 81
- Sa vz.58
- Tabuk rifle
- Zastava M70

Battle Rifle

- FN FAL
- Zastava M70B1

Marksman/Sniper Rifle

- SVD Dragunov
- Zastava M70
- Zastava M76
- Tabuk Sniper Rifle
- Steyr SSG 69
- PSL (rifle)

Machinegun

- PK machine gun
- FN MAG
- MG 3
- Zastava M53
- PKT
- RPK
- RPD
- Al Quds
- Zastava M72
- Type 67
- Zastava M80
- NSV machine gun
- DShK
- KPV
- Type 80
- Zastava M84
- SG-43 Goryunov
- DSHKM

Flame throwers

- LPO-50

Anti-tank rockets & recoilless rifles

- Type 69 RPG
- RPG-7
- SPG-9
- M136 AT4

Anti-tank guided missiles

- MILAN
- 9M14 Malyutka
- 9K111 Fagot

Tanks

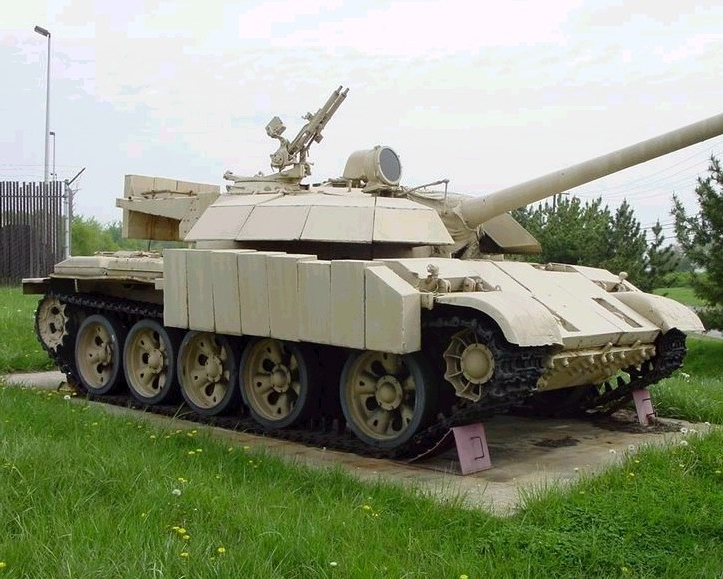
Iraqi T-55 Enigma.

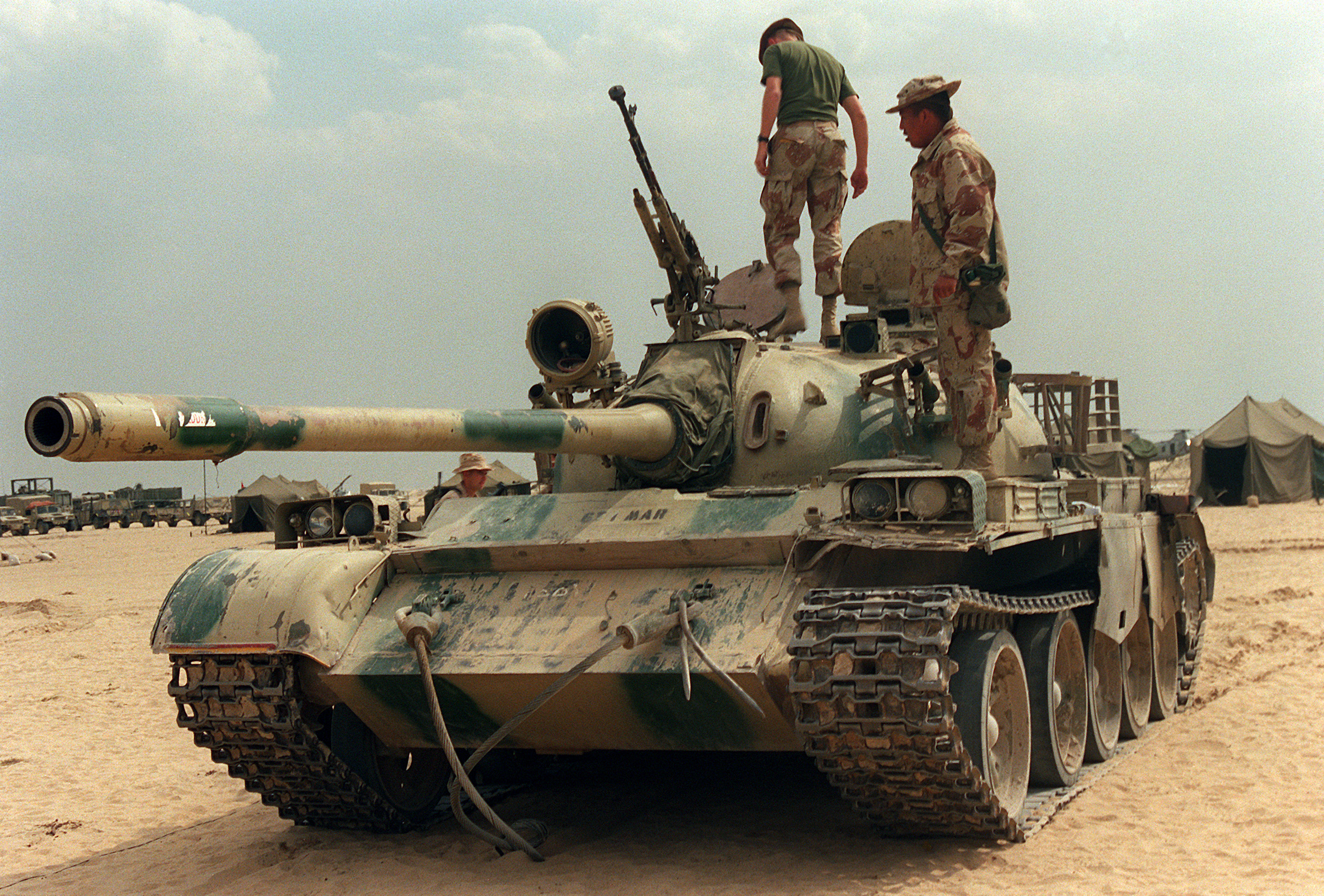
Type 69-II tank captured during Operation Desert Storm.

- T-72M/M1 MBT (Main Battle Tank)
- T-72 Ural MBT (Main Battle Tank)
- Asad Babil MBT (Main Battle Tank)
- T-62 MBT (Main Battle Tank)
- T-55A MBT (Main Battle Tank)
- T-55 MBT (Main Battle Tank)
- T-54 MBT (Main Battle Tank)
- T-55 Enigma MBT (Main Battle Tank)
- T-55QM MBT (Main Battle Tank)
- T-55QM2 MBT (Main Battle Tank)
- Type 59 MBT (Main Battle Tank)
- Type 69-II MBT (Main Battle Tank)
- Type 69-QM MBT (Main Battle Tank)
- Type 69-QM2 MBT (Main Battle Tank)
- TR 800 MBT (Main Battle Tank)
- PT-76 Amphibious Tank

Armoured vehicles

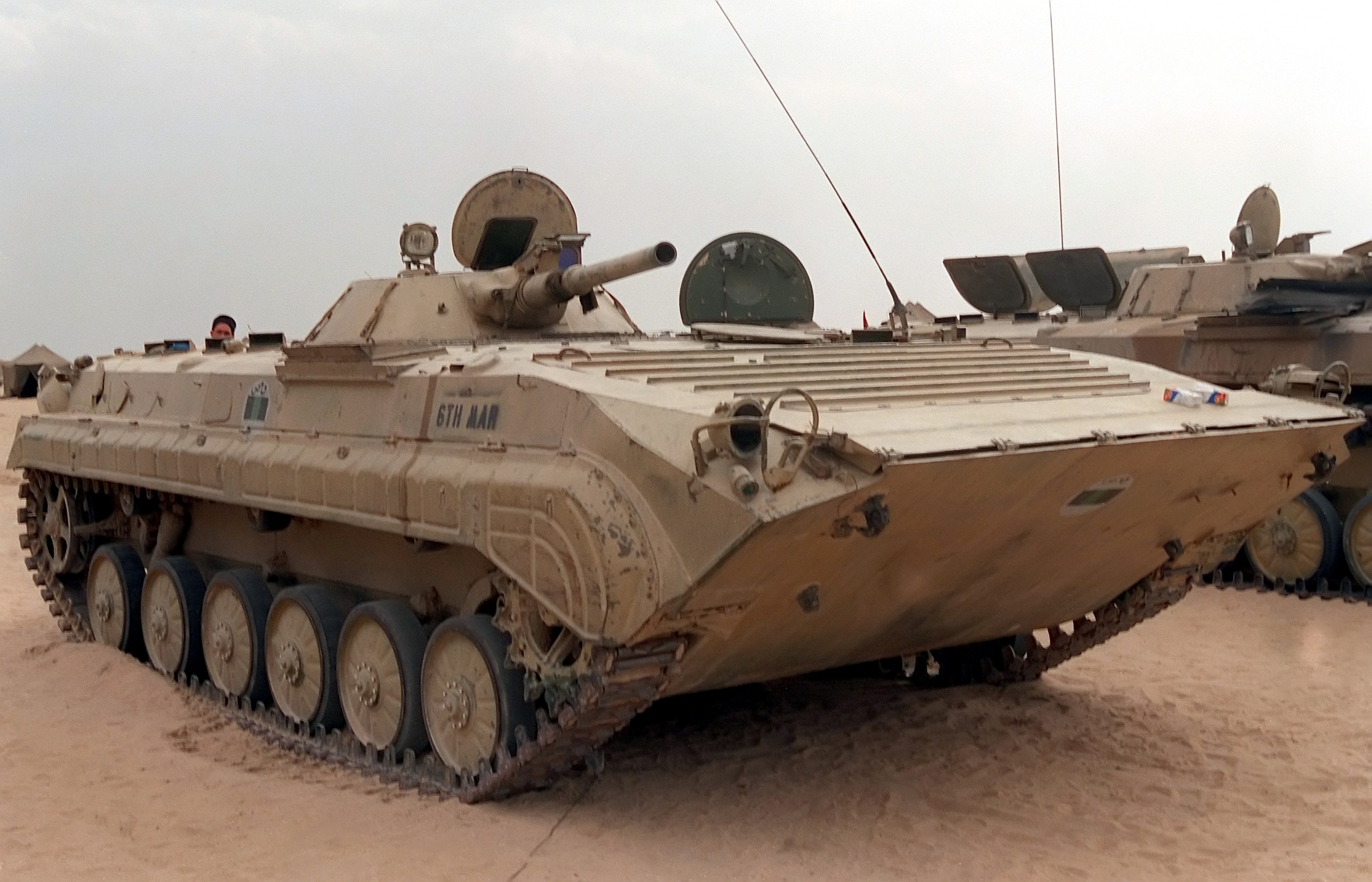
Ex-Iraqi BMP-1 captured by US forces in Iraq during Operation Desert Storm.

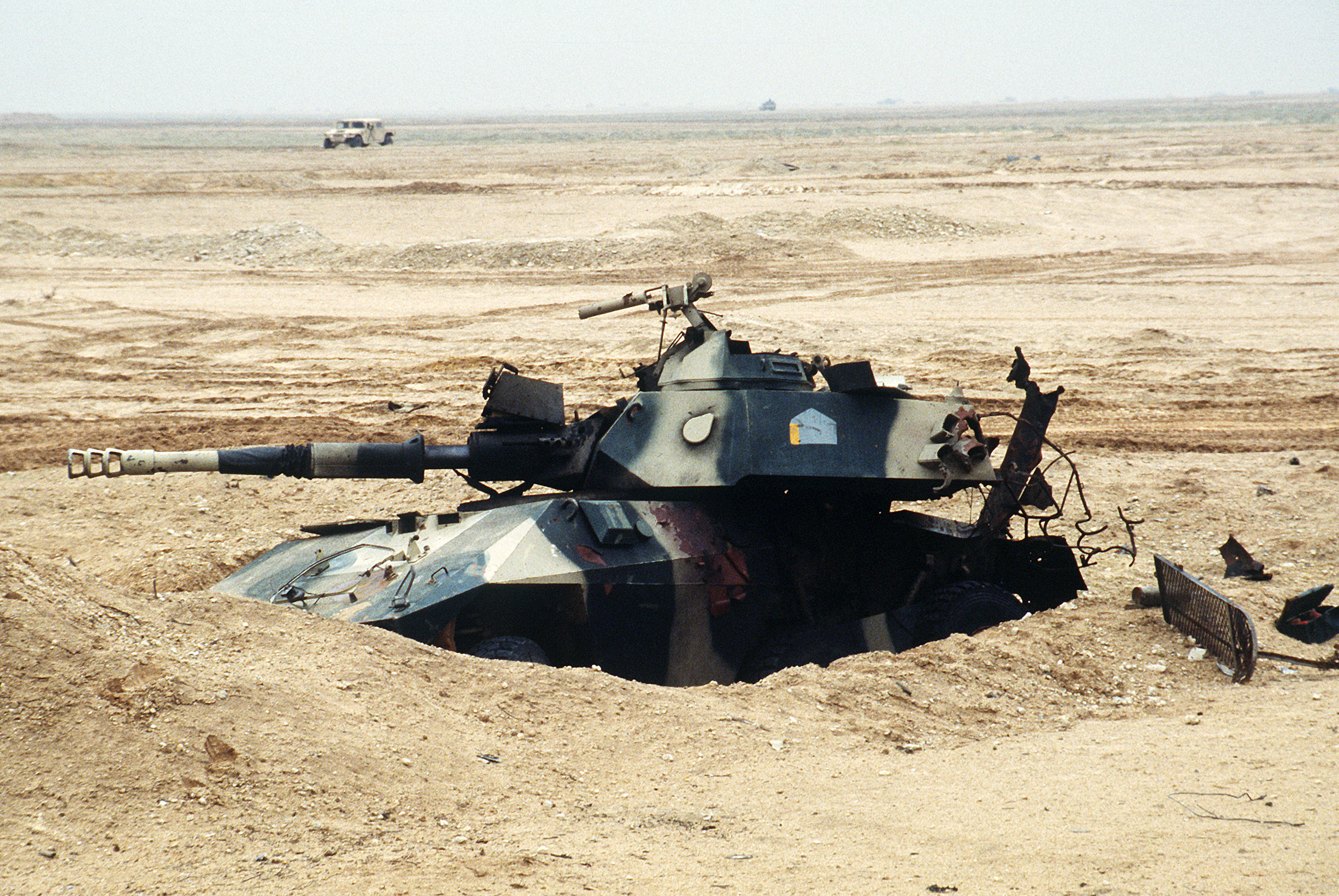
Iraqi EE-9 Cascavel armoured car hit by Coalition tank fire in February 1991.

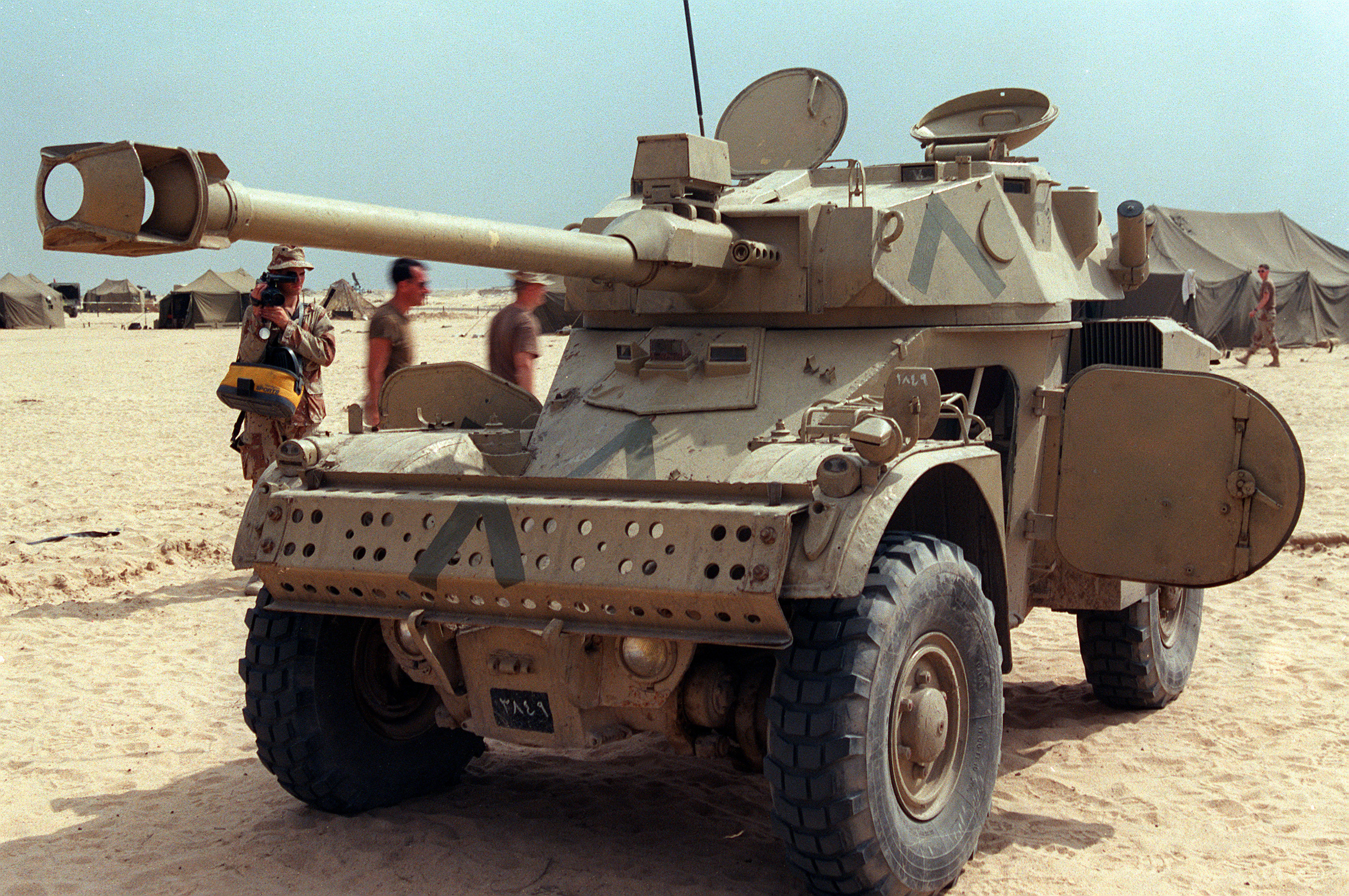
Captured Iraqi Panhard AML-90.

- BMP-1 IFV (Infantry Fighting Vehicle)
- BMP-2 IFV (Infantry Fighting Vehicle)
- AMX-10P IFV (Infantry Fighting Vehicle)
- Panhard AML-60 Armoured Car
- Panhard AML-90 Armoured Car
- Engesa EE-9 Cascavel Armoured Car
- Engesa EE-3 Jararaca Reconnaissance Vehicle
- BRDM-2 (Reconnaissance Vehicle)
- Panhard M3 (Armored Personnel Carrier)
- Engesa EE-11 Urutu APC (Armored Personnel Carrier)
- YW351 APC (Armored Personnel Carrier)
- OT-62C APC (Armored Personnel Carrier)
- OT-64C SKOT-2A APC (Armored Personnel Carrier)
- Walid (armored personnel carrier) (Armored Personnel Carrier)
- PSZH D-944 APC (Armored Personnel Carrier)
- MT-LB APC (Armored Personnel Carrier)
- Mowag Roland APC (Armored Personnel Carrier)
- BTR-50P APC (Armored Personnel Carrier)
- BTR-60PB APC (Armored Personnel Carrier)
- BTR-80 APC (Armored Personnel Carrier)
- OT M-60P APC (Armored Personnel Carrier)
- Panhard VCR-TH ATGM (Anti-Tank Guided Missile) Launcher Vehicle
- BRDM-2 9P133 ATGM (Anti-Tank Guided Missile) Launcher Vehicle

Self-Propelled Artillery/Mortars/Rockets/Missiles

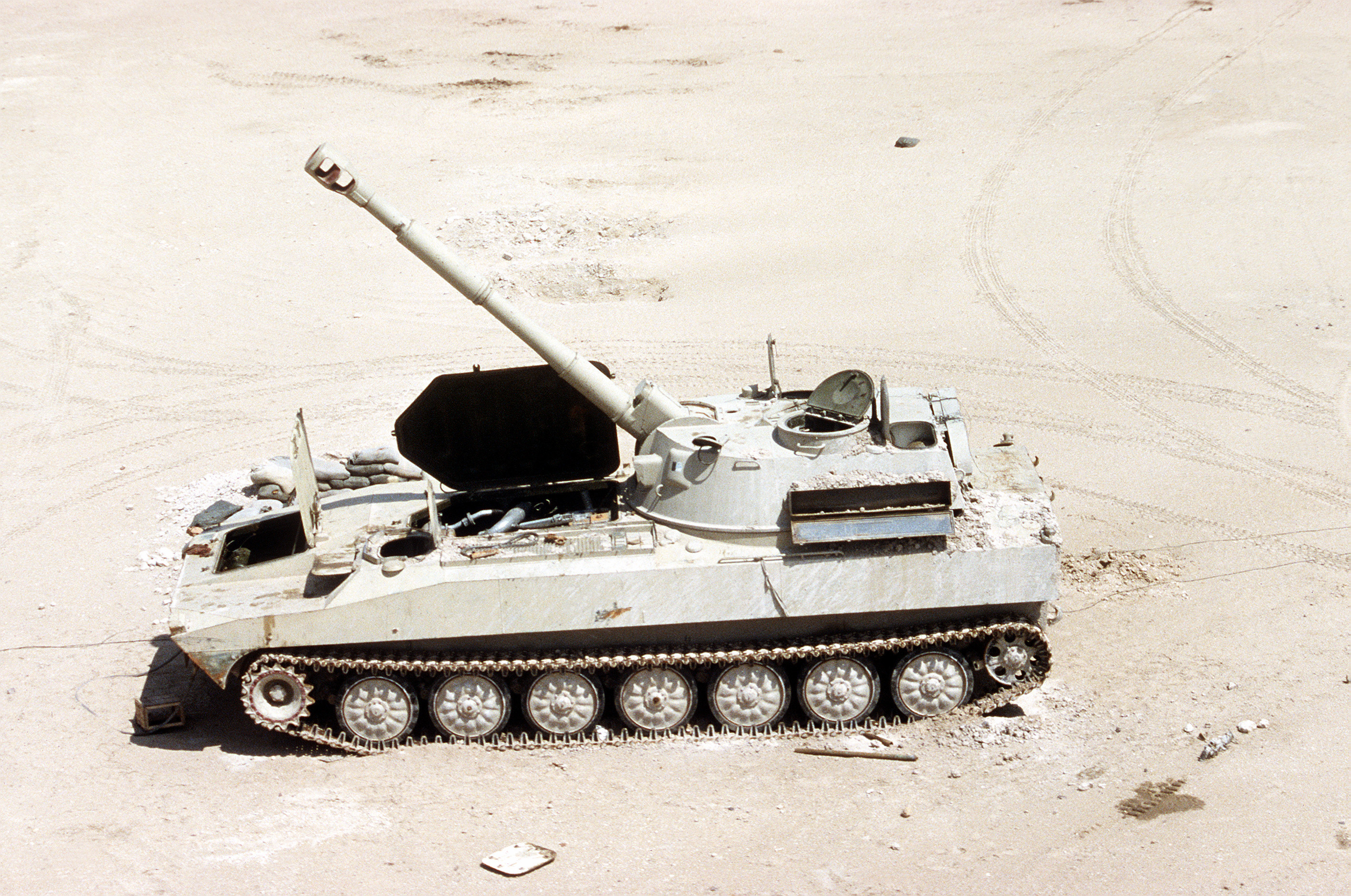
Iraqi 2S1 Gvozdika 122mm self-propelled howitzer after being deserted by Iraqi forces during Operation Desert Storm.

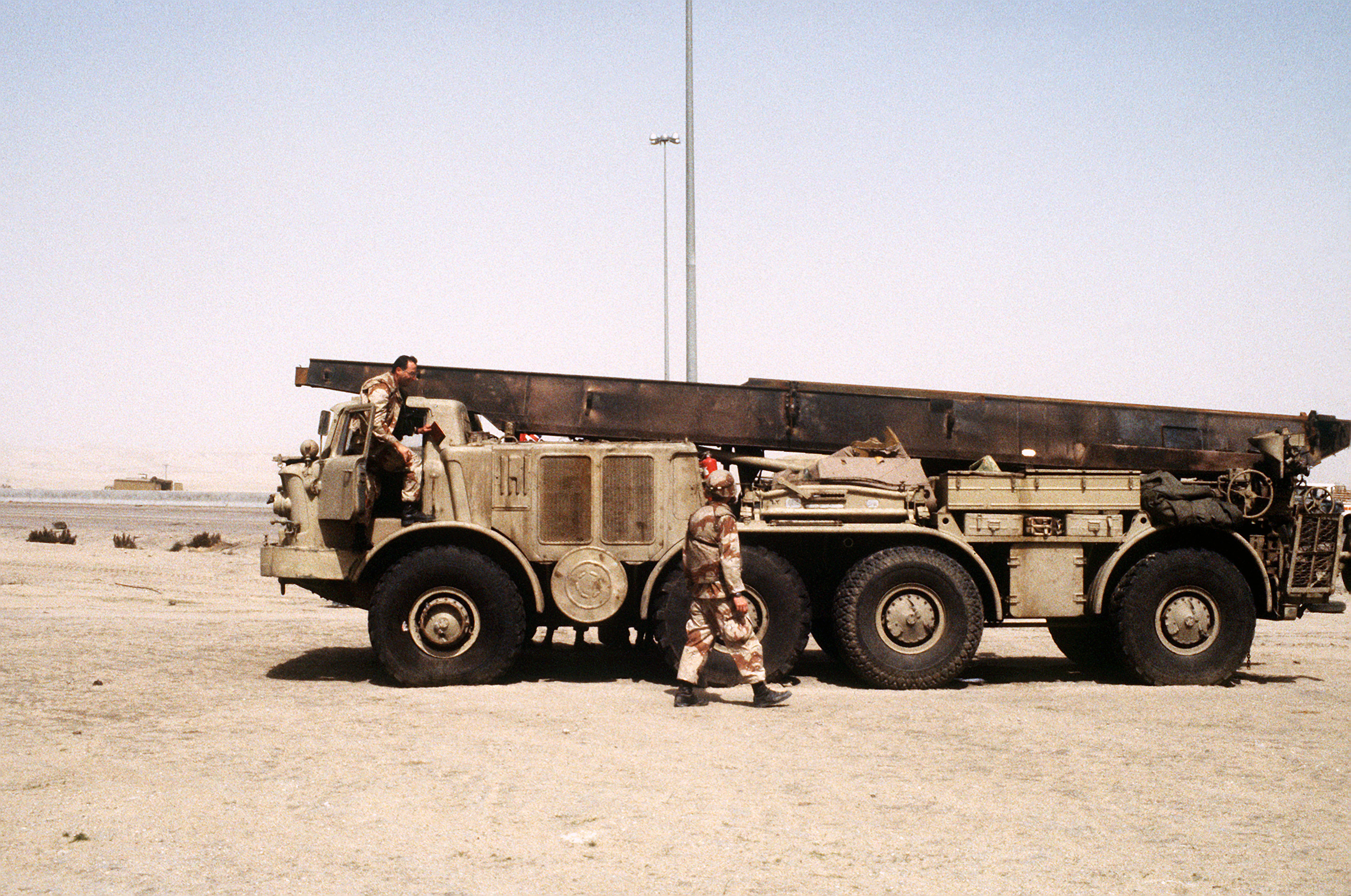
Iraqi FROG-7, or Free Rocket Over Ground (FROG) artillery rocket system transporter erector launcher (TEL) captured during Operation Desert Storm.

- 2S1 Gvozdika 122 mm SPH (Self-Propelled Howitzer)
- 2S3 Akatsiya 152 mm SPH (Self-Propelled Howitzer)
- AMX-GCT 155 mm SPH (Self-Propelled Howitzer)
- M109A1 155 mm SPH (Self-Propelled Howitzer)
- ASTROS II MLRS (Multiple Launch Rocket System)
- RL-21 122 mm (Multiple Rocket Launcher)
- BM-21 Grad 122 mm MRL (Multiple Rocket Launcher)
- FROG-7 Luna-M TEL (Transporter/Erector/Launcher)
- 9P117/SS-1c Scud-B TEL (Transporter/Erector/Launcher)

Anti-aircraft

- ZSU-57-2 SPAAA (Self-Propelled Anti-Aircraft Artillery)
- ZSU-23-4 Shilka SPAAA (Self-Propelled Anti-Aircraft Artillery)
- NIIP\Vympel 2K12 "Kub" SA-6a Gainful Self-Propelled SAM (Surface-To-Air Missile) Launcher
- Antey 9K33M Osa-AK SA-8b Gecko Self-Propelled SAM (Surface-To-Air Missile) Launcher
- Nudelman 9K31 "Strela-1" SA-9 Gaskin Self-Propelled SAM (Surface-To-Air Missile) Launcher
- ZRK-BD 9K35 "Strela-10" SA-13 Gopher Self-Propelled SAM (Surface-To-Air Missile) Launcher
- AMX-30 Roland 2 Self-Propelled SAM (Surface-To-Air Missile) Launcher
- Lavochkin OKB S-75 Dvina SA-2 Guideline SAM (Surface-To-Air Missile) Launcher
- Isayev S-125M "Neva-M" SA-3b Goa SAM (Surface-To-Air Missile) Launcher
- Roland 2 SAM (Surface-To-Air Missile) Launcher
- ZPU-1 14.5 mm Towed AAA (Anti-Aircraft Artillery)
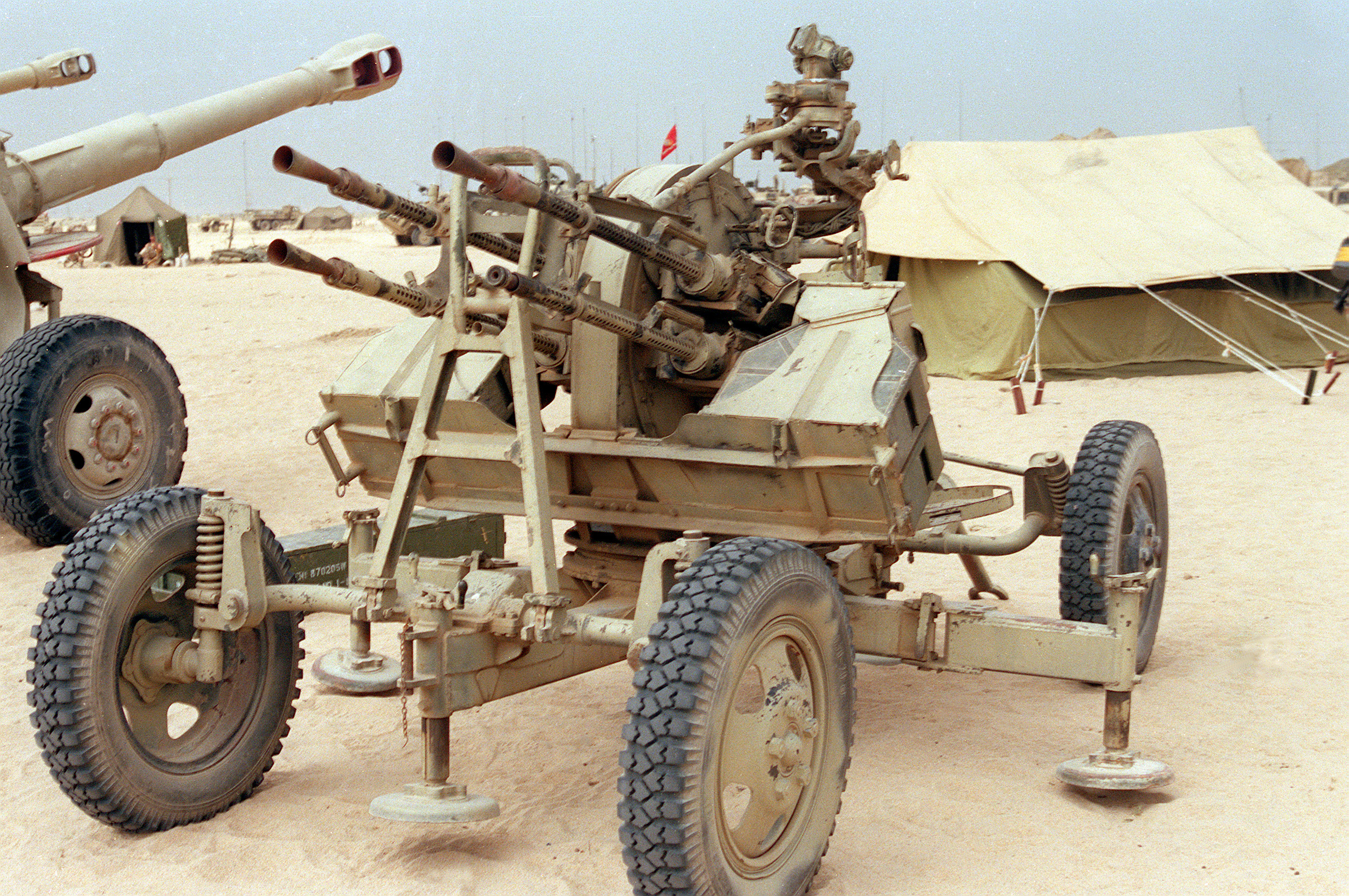
  ZPU-4 anti-aircraft machine gun that was captured from Iraqi forces during Operation Desert Storm.
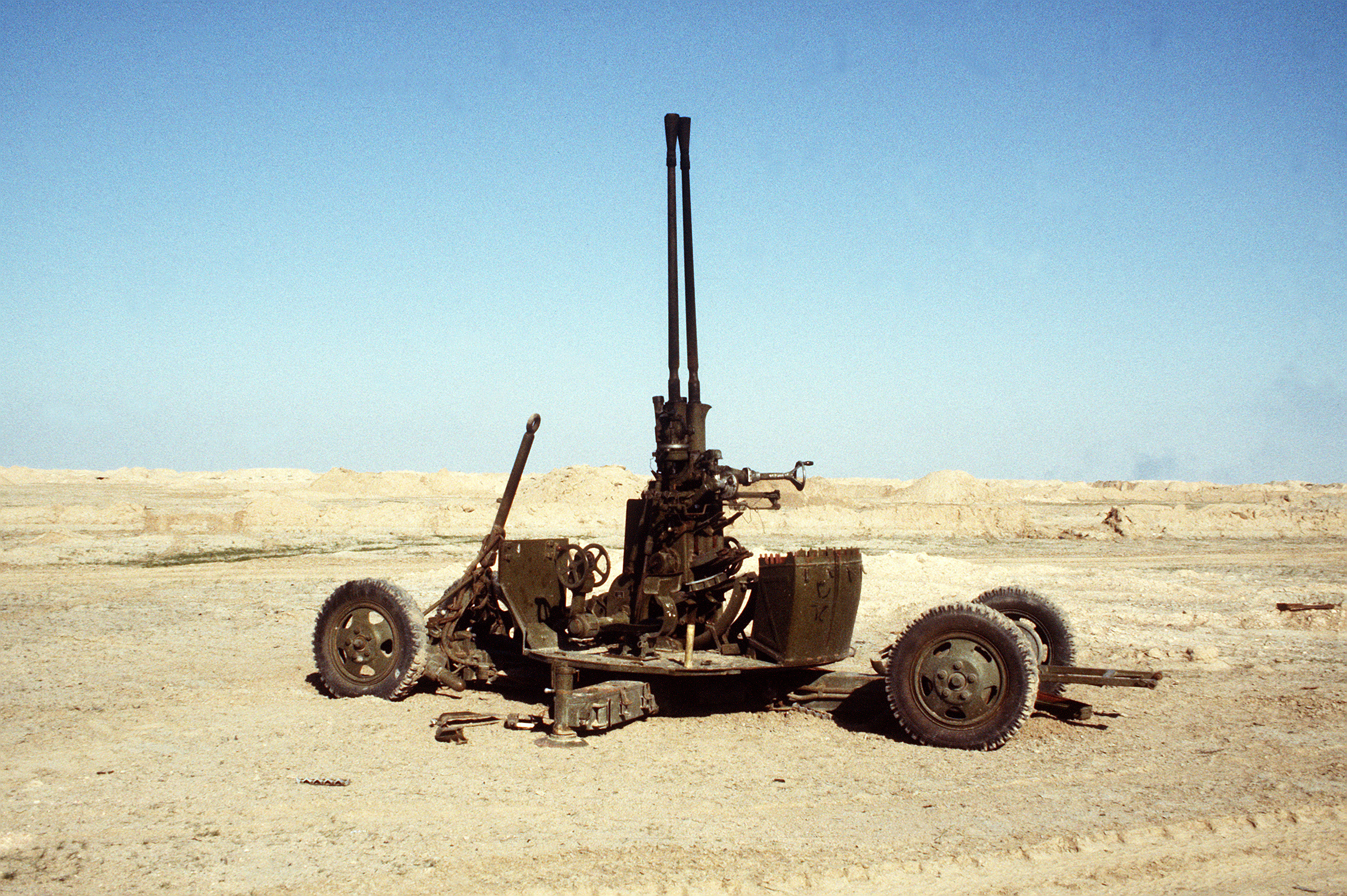
  Twin M1939 37 mm anti-aircraft gun, abandoned by the Iraqi Republican Guard during Operation Desert Storm.
- ZPU-2 14.5 mm Towed AAA (Anti-Aircraft Artillery)
- ZPU-4 14.5 mm Towed AAA (Anti-Aircraft Artillery)
- ZU-23-2 23 mm Towed AAA (Anti-Aircraft Artillery)
- M1939 37 mm Towed AAA (Anti-Aircraft Artillery)
- S-60 57 mm Towed AAA (Anti-Aircraft Artillery)
- S-60 Twin 57 mm Towed AAA (Anti-Aircraft Artillery)
- KS-19 100 mm Towed AAA (Anti-Aircraft Artillery)

Artillery/mortars/rockets

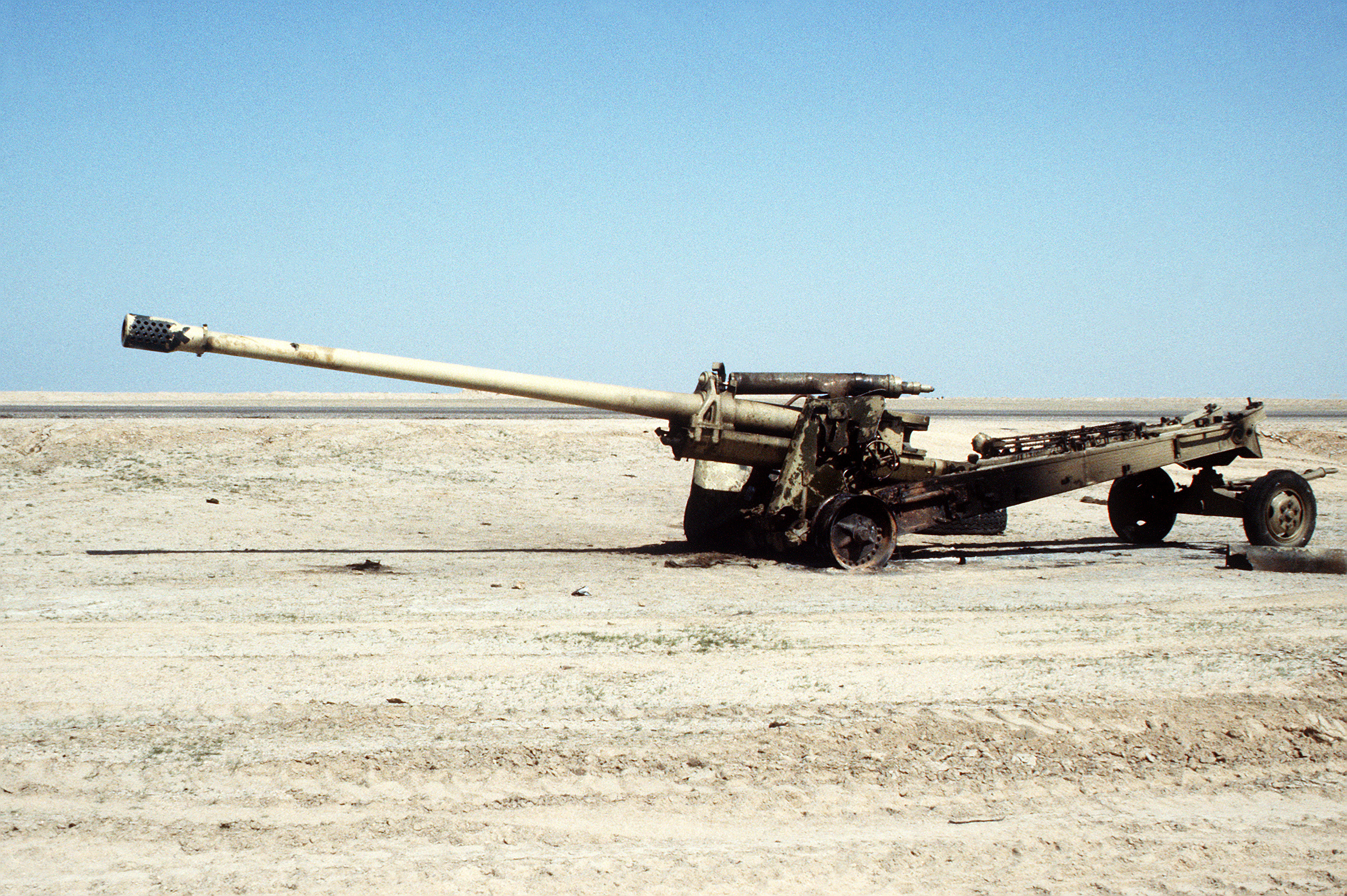
M-46 130mm howitzer of the Iraqi Republican Guard destroyed during Operation Desert Storm.

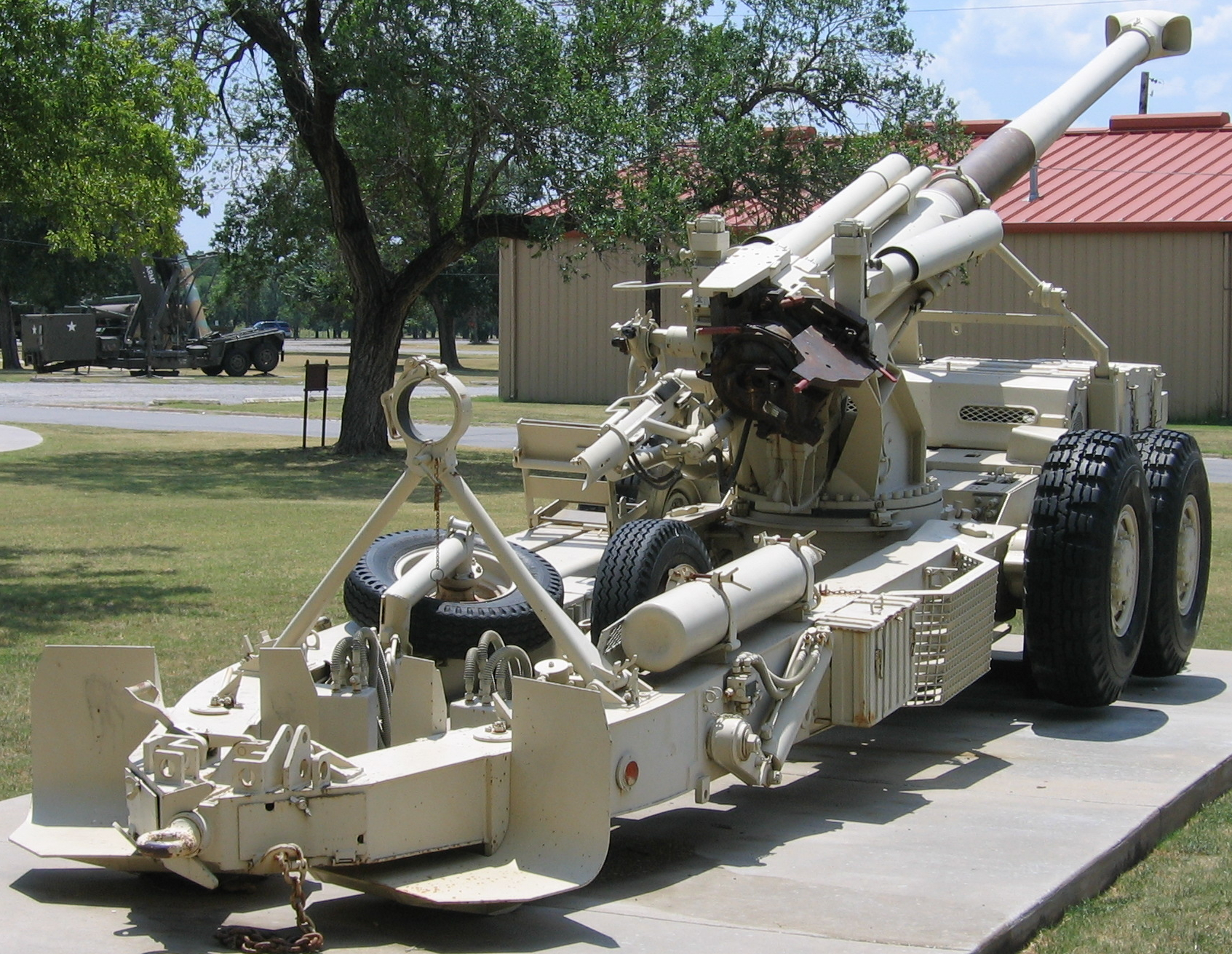
Iraqi G5 155mm howitzer.

- T-12 100 mm Anti-Tank Gun
- Type 63 107 mm MRL (Multiple Rocket Launcher)
- D-30 122 mm Towed Howitzer
- 130 mm towed field gun M1954 (M-46)
- 152 mm towed gun-howitzer M1955 (D-20)
- 2A36 152 mm Towed Howitzer
- Type 83 152 mm Towed Howitzer
- GHN-45 155 mm Towed Howitzer
- M-46 155 mm Towed Howitzer
- G5 155 mm Towed Howitzer
- Al-Jaleel 82 mm Mortar
- Al-Jaleel 120 mm Mortar
- M43 160 mm Mortar
- M240 240 mm Mortar

Engineering and recovery vehicles

- Type 653 ARV (Armoured Recovery Vehicle)
- FV4024 Chieftain ARV (Armoured Recovery Vehicle)

Command vehicles

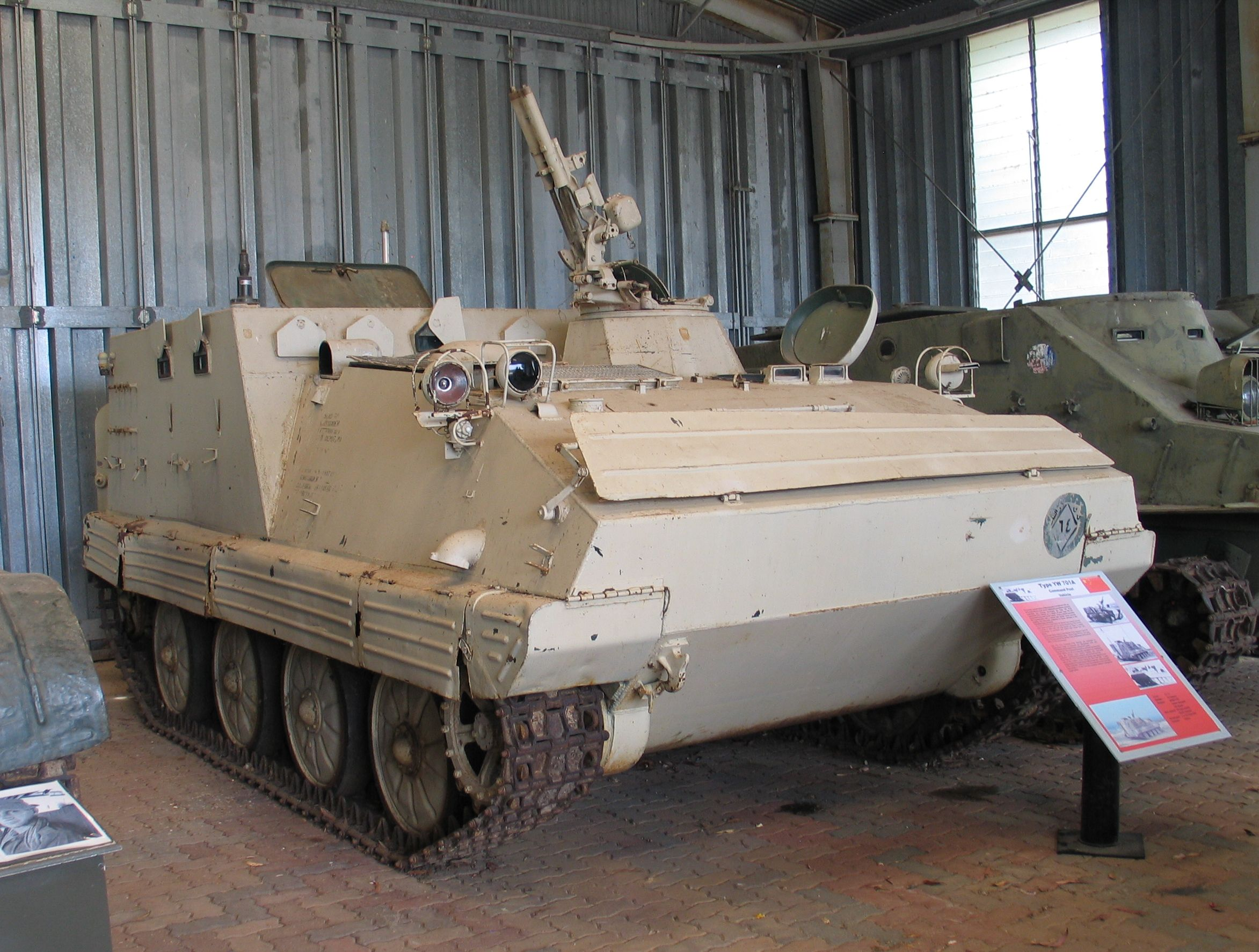
Former Iraqi YW701 command vehicle, on display at the Puckkapunyal Military Museum.

- Type 63 YW-701 CP (Command Post)
- BTR-50PU Command Vehicle
- BTR-60PU Command Vehicle

Other vehicles

- Mercedes-Benz Unimog
- GAZ-66
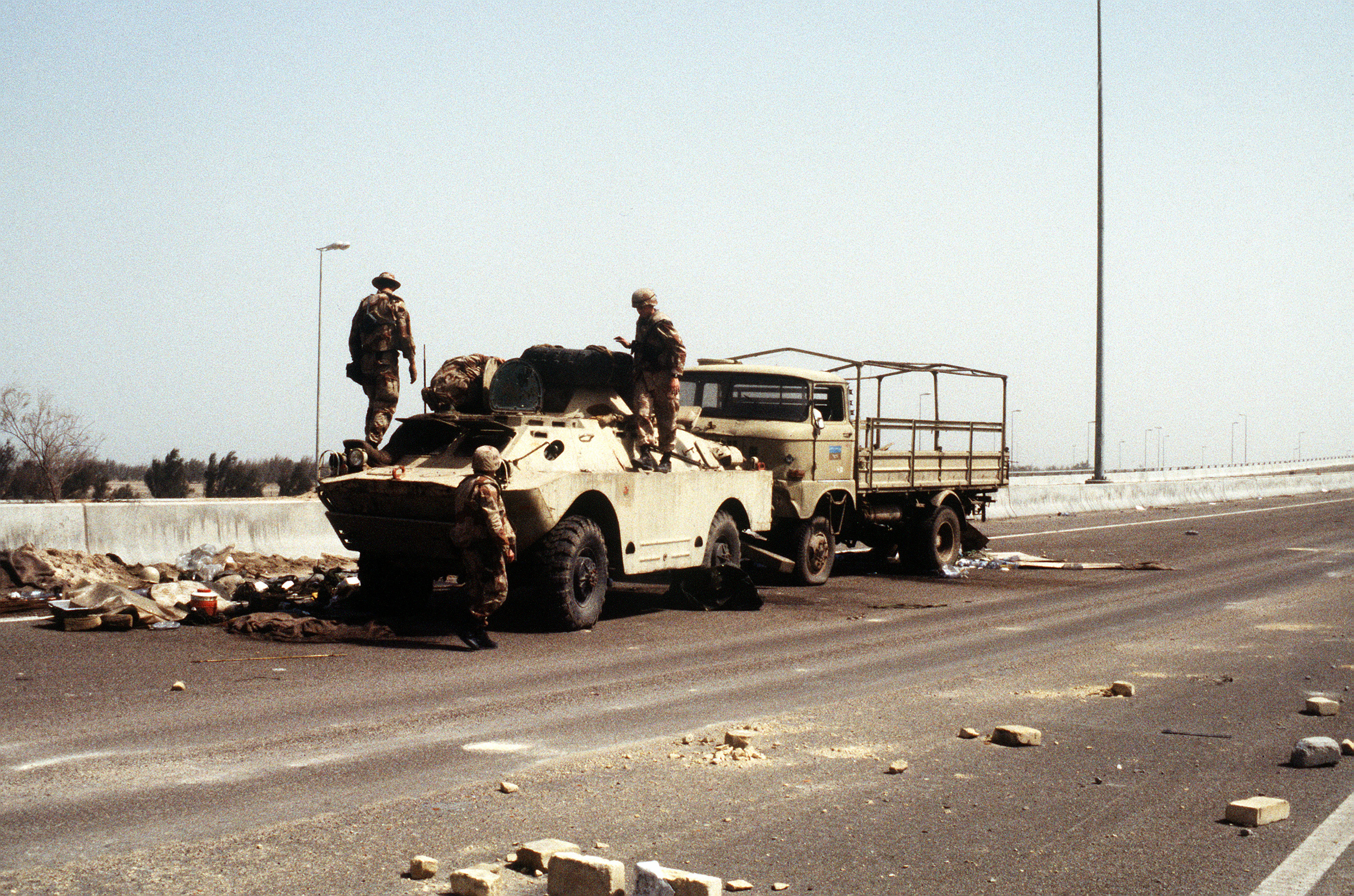
  Iraqi BRDM-2RKhb and IFA W50 truck captured by the coalition during Operation Desert Storm.
- KrAZ-255
- Ural-375D
- Ural-4320
- DAC-665T
- IFA W50
- ZIL-130
- ZIL-131
- Land Rover Series
- UAZ-469
- Ural M-61 Motorcycle

==== Aircraft ====
Helicopters

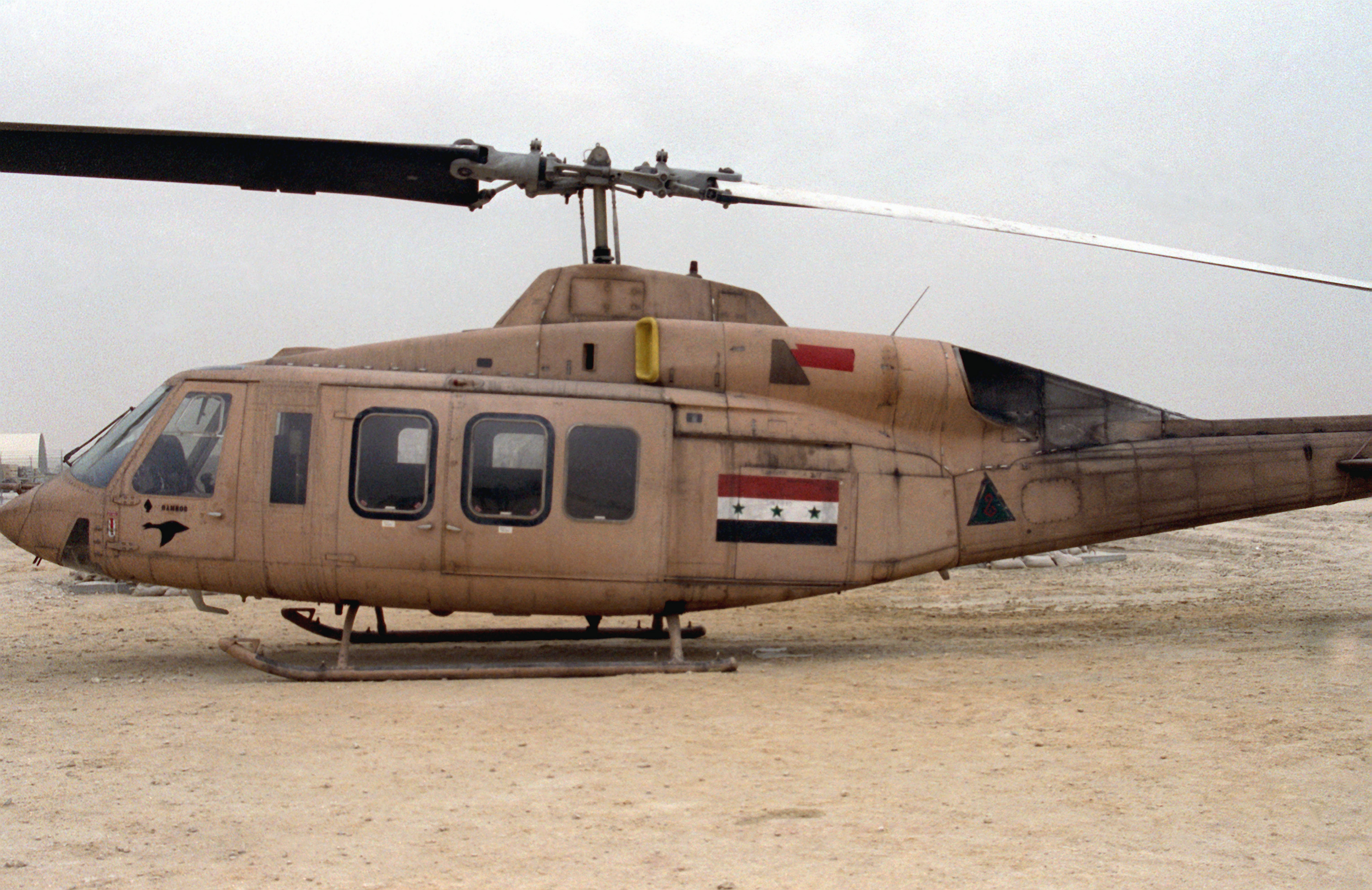
Iraqi Air Force Bell 214ST transport helicopter, after being captured by a US Marine Corps unit at the start of the ground phase of Operation Desert Storm

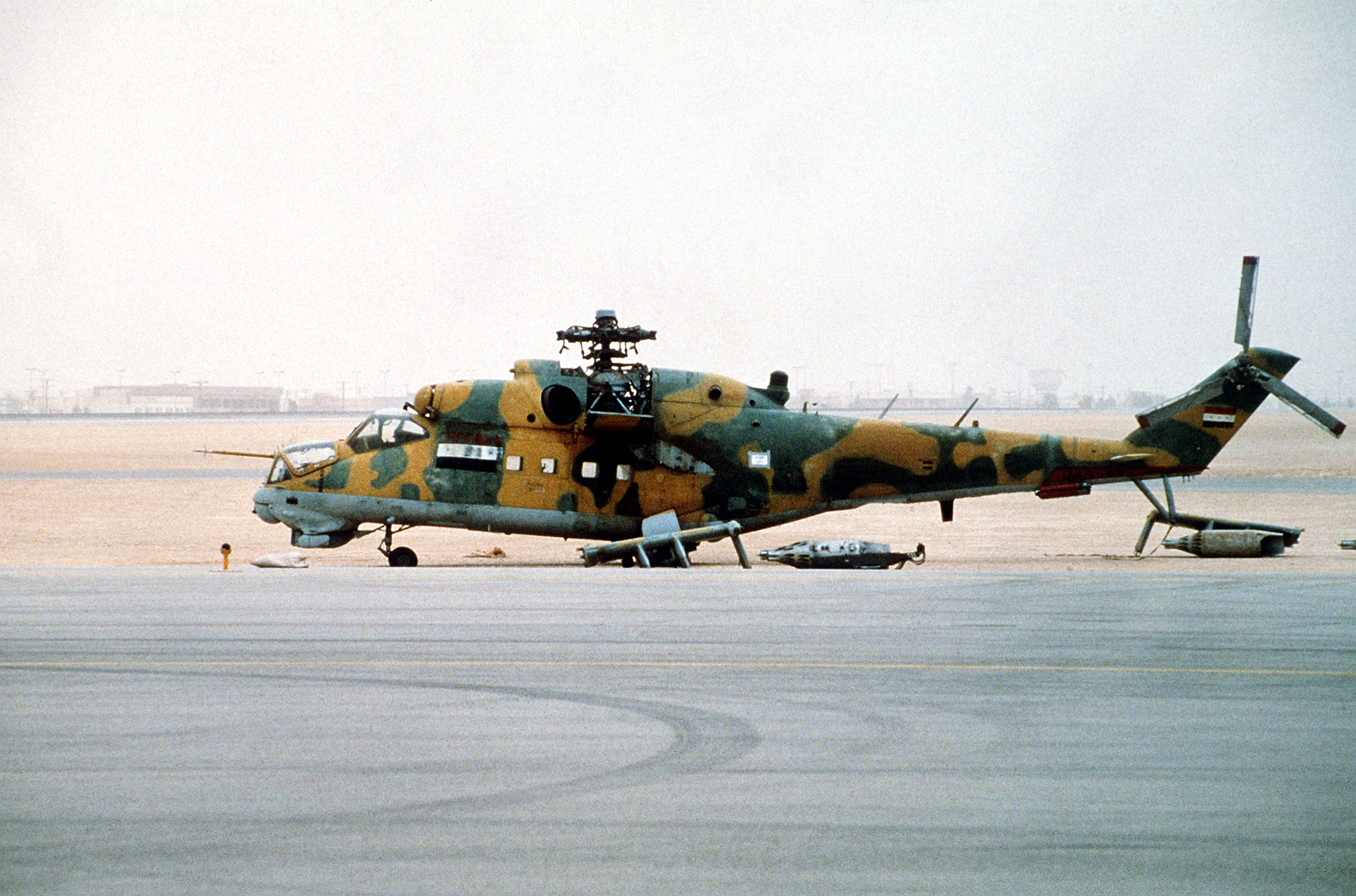
A captured Iraqi Mil Mi-24D Hind-D helicopter stands at an XVIII Airborne Corps airfield during Operation Desert Storm.

- Aérospatiale SA-316B Alouette III
- Aérospatiale SA-321H Super Frelon
- Aérospatiale SA-330 Puma
- Aérospatiale SA-342K Gazelle
- Bell 214ST
- Bölkow Bo-105C
- Bölkow Bo-105L
- Hughes 300C
- Hughes MD-500MD Defender
- Hughes MD-530F
- MBB/Kawasaki BK-117
- Mil Mi-1 Hare
- Mil Mi-4A Hound-A
- Mil Mi-6T Hook-A
- Mil Mi-8T Hip-C
- Mil Mi-8TV Hip-F asd
- Mil Mi-17 Hip-H
- Mil Mi-25 Hind-D

Airplanes

- Antonov An-12 Cub-A
- Antonov An-2 Colt
- Antonov An-24 Coke
- Antonov An-26 Curl-A
- Antonov An-32 Cline
- Aero L-29C "Delfín" Maya
- Aero L-39C Albatros
- Aero L-39ZO Albatros
- Chengdu F-7A Fishcan
- Britten Norman BN-2 Islander
- Dassault Falcon 50
- Dassault Mirage F1EQ
- Dassault-Breguet Super Étendard
- de Havilland Canada DHC-1 Chipmunk
- de Havilland DH.100 Vampire FB.52
- de Havilland DH.112 Venom FB.50
- Hawker Hunter F.6
- Iljushin Il-28 Beagle
- Ilyushin Il-76M Candid-B
- Mikoyan-Gurevich MiG-15bis Fagot
- Mikoyan-Gurevich MiG-17F Fresco-C
- Mikoyan-Gurevich MiG-17PF Fresco-D
- Mikoyan-Gurevich MiG-19S Farmer-C
- Mikoyan-Gurevich MiG-21MF Fishbed-J
- Mikoyan-Gurevich MiG-21bis Fishbed-N
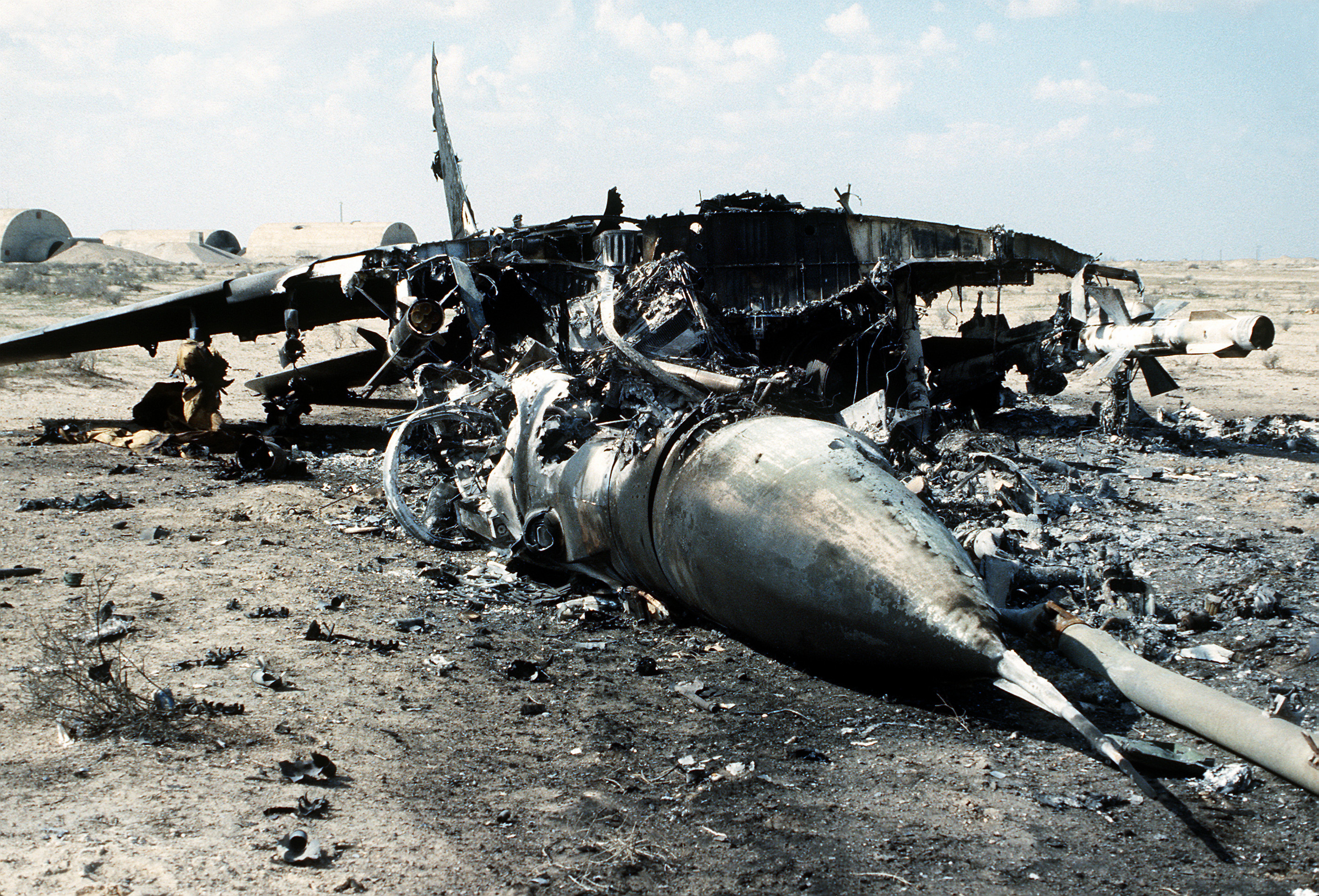
  Iraqi Air Force Mikoyan MiG-29 destroyed on the ground by US Special Forces at the Tallil Airbase near Nasiriyah, southern Iraq.
- Mikoyan-Gurevich MiG-23BN Flogger-H
- Mikoyan-Gurevich MiG-23MF Flogger-B
- Mikoyan-Gurevich MiG-23MS Flogger-E
- Mikoyan-Gurevich MiG-25P Foxbat-A
- Mikoyan-Gurevich MiG-25RB Foxbat-B
- Mikoyan MiG-29B Fulcrum-A
- North American F-86F Sabre
- Shenyang F-6A Farmer
- Sukhoi Su-7B Fitter-A
- Sukhoi Su-20 Fitter
- Sukhoi Su-22UM-3K Fitter-G
- Sukhoi Su-22M-4 Fitter-K
- Sukhoi Su-24MK Fencer-D
- Sukhoi Su-25K Frogfoot-A
- Tupolev Tu-22K Blinder
- Xian H-6D Badger
- Yakovlev Yak-18 Max

==== Ships ====
Landing ships

- Type 773 Polnocny Class

Fast attack ships

- TNC-45
- Osa class

Minelayers

- Type 43 Class

Patrol boats

- Zhuk Class

== See also ==
- Operation Granby order of battle (UK)
