= Suisun Bay Reserve Fleet =

United States reserve fleet managed by the Maritime Administration

Coordinates: 38°4′24.12″N 122°5′23.82″W

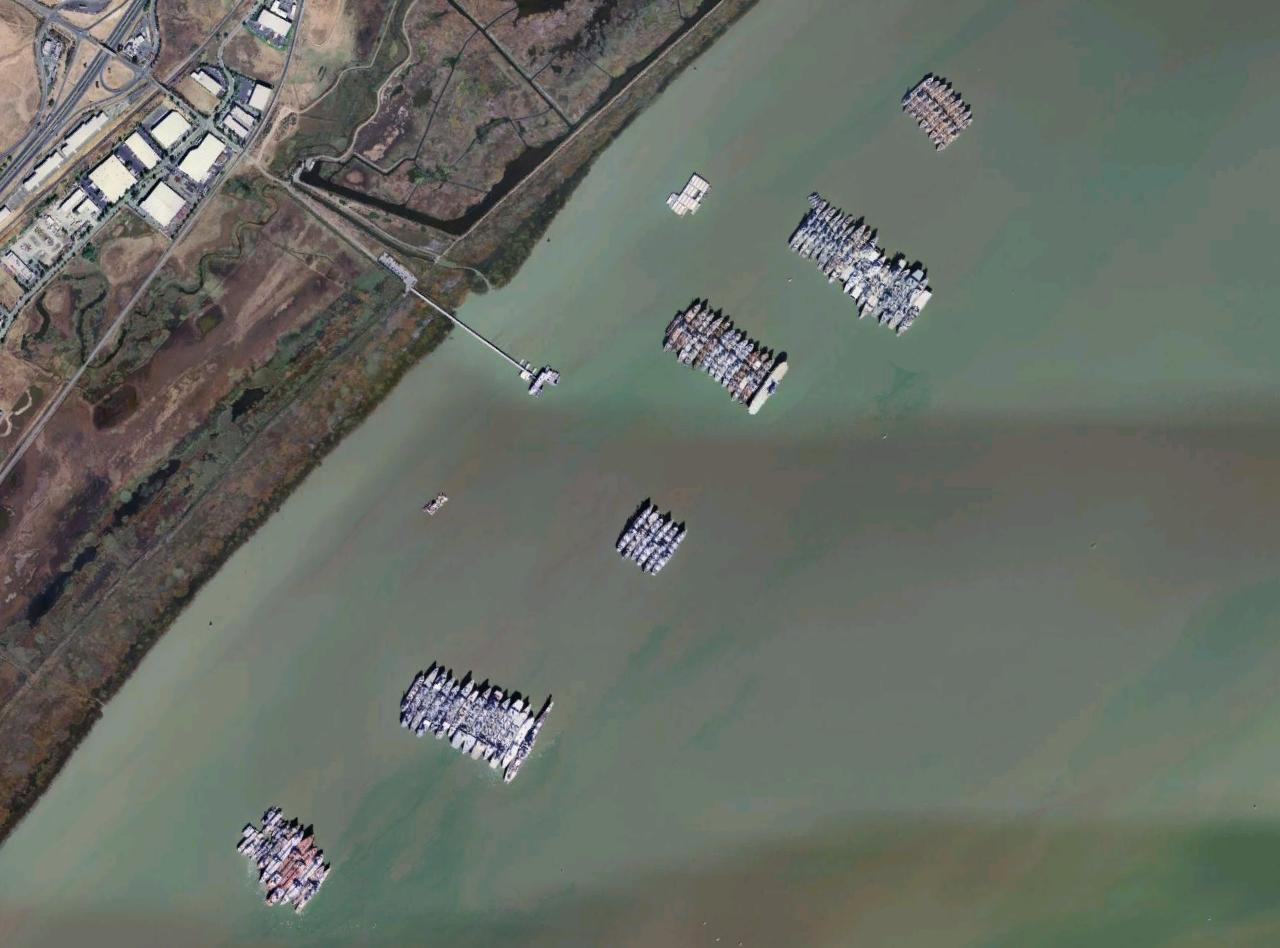
Ships of the reserve fleet, Suisun Bay, c. 2001. Battleship USS Iowa (BB-61) is 2nd row from the bottom (moored at the Port of Los Angeles since 2012 as the USS Iowa Museum.)

The Suisun Bay Reserve Fleet colloquially known as the mothball fleet, is located on the northwest side of Suisun Bay (the northern portion of the greater San Francisco Bay estuary) in Benicia, California. The fleet is within a regulated navigation area that is about 4 1/2 miles (7.2 kilometers) long and 1/2 mile (0.80 km) wide. It begins just north of the Union Pacific Railroad Bridge and runs northeast, parallel to the shoreline. Water depths range from about 46 feet (14 meters) at Mean Lower Low Water (MLLW) at the foot of the anchorage, to about 26 feet (8 m) MLLW at the shallowest berths towards the northern end of the anchorage. As of September 2026, ten ships remain in the fleet (see below).

== Purpose ==
The United States Maritime Administration (MARAD) military caretaker oversees the National Defense Reserve Fleet, which serves as a buffer of ships for national defense and national emergency purposes. The program began in 1946 at the end of World War II. At its peak in 1950, it had more than 2,000 ships in lay-up. One of the reserve sites is in Suisun Bay, in the northern portion of San Francisco Bay, in California. Only a small portion of vessels currently remain with the Suisun fleet. In January 2016, the U.S. Department of Transportation (DOT) and MARAD officially announced the Suisun site closure in February 2017, any remaining ships would be sold at auction or scrapped. The only occupied reserve fleets would be the James River Reserve Fleet in Virginia and the Beaumont Reserve Fleet in Texas.However, as of September 2026 the Suisun Bay Reserve Fleet is still occupied.

== Environmental issues ==
The State of California and several environmental groups have raised concerns about the environmental impacts of the fleet. Potential concerns include heavy metals and anti-fouling agents in the paint that is peeling off of the vessels, as well as PCBs and other hazardous materials that may have been released. Congress responded to these concerns by funding the National Oceanic and Atmospheric Administration (NOAA) to design and implement a study of contaminants in the vicinity of the fleet.

NOAA's Damage Assessment, Response, and Restoration Program (DARRP) began work on this project in January 2008. Since then, NOAA's team has assessed existing data from the area to determine data gaps, researched the history and environmental setting of the site, discussed the project with numerous stakeholders, conducted a site visit, and developed and refined a sampling and analysis plan. NOAA deployed bivalve samples in June 2008 and collected sediment and bivalve tissue samples from the area in July 2008. A second field sampling event for additional tissue samples occurred in September. These samples were analyzed and a data report was delivered in early 2009.

Based on these findings, the United States Government has reached an agreement with Arc Ecology, San Francisco BayKeeper, Natural Resources Defense Council, and the California Regional Water Quality Control Board, San Francisco Bay Region (Regional Board) regarding the maintenance and disposal of obsolete ships owned by the U.S. Department of Transportation's Maritime Administration (MARAD) at the Suisun Bay Reserve Fleet site, resolving a lawsuit in the Eastern District of California. Under the agreement, MARAD would clean, maintain, and dispose of these ships in a manner that prevents them from polluting the bay. The Maritime Administration began removing obsolete ships from Suisun Bay for recycling in November 2009. As of September 2026 ten ships remain.

Under the terms of the settlement:

- Hazardous paint debris collected on vessel decks would be removed within 120 days
- All the obsolete ships currently located at the site would be cleaned of flaking paint within two years
- Twenty-eight ships in the worst condition would be removed for disposal by 30 September 2012
- Before their removal, these ships would be sent to a local drydock for cleaning (removing marine growth from the underwater hull and removing flaking paint from areas above the water)
- All the obsolete ships located at the site would be removed for disposal by September 30, 2017
- Before removal, the ships would be maintained according to locally approved best management practices, as monitored by the Regional Board
- The horizontal surfaces of the obsolete ships would be cleaned every 90 days to prevent peeling paint from getting into the water, monthly and quarterly inspections will be conducted, and water runoff samples will be collected regularly
- No new ships with excess flaking paint would be admitted to the fleet site

== Inventory ==
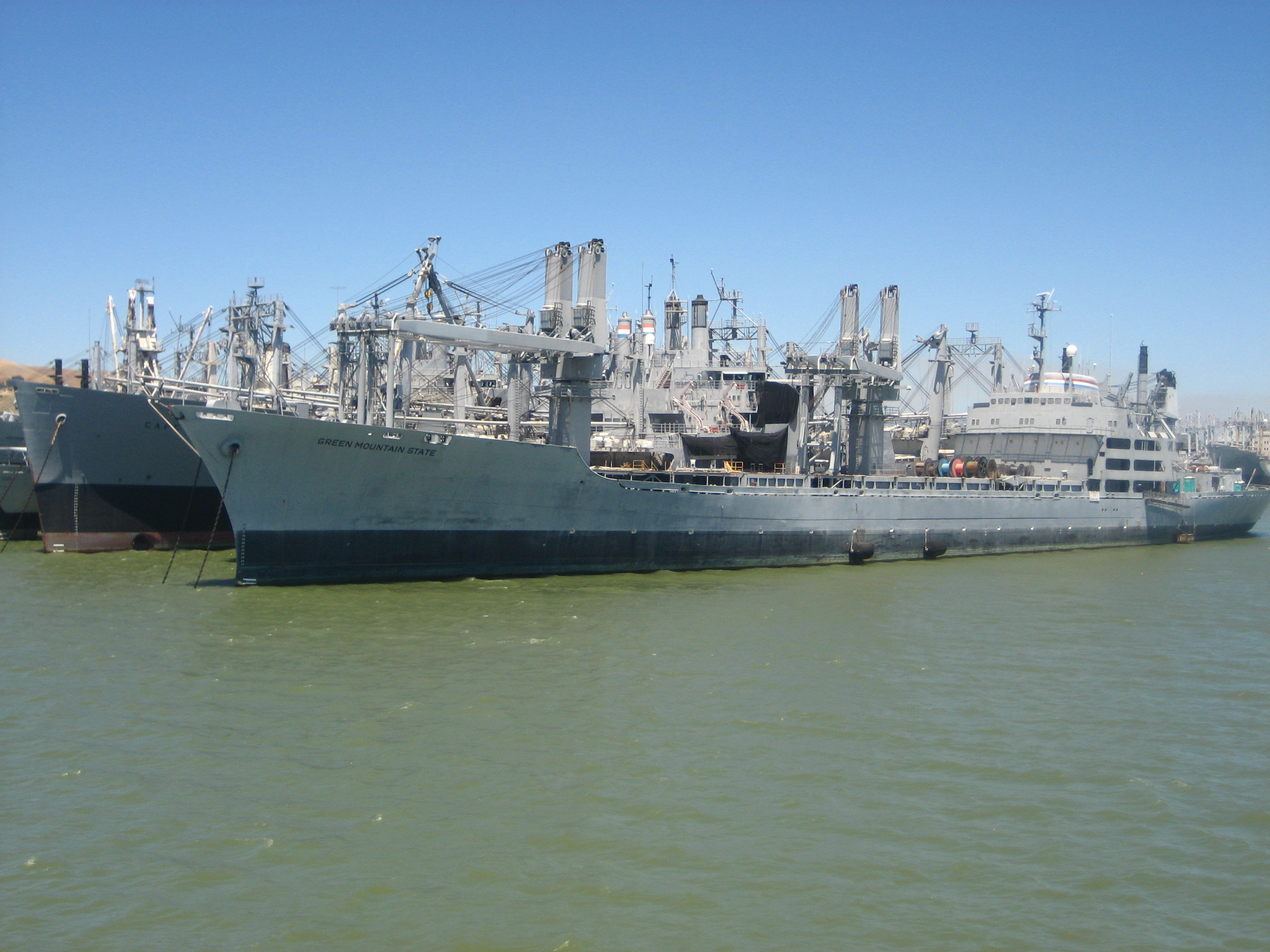
SS Green Mountain State (foreground)

=== Current ===
As of September 2026:

Name	Division	Hull No.	Year built	Design	Status
Retention - Barge
FB-62 (APL BARGE)	Pacific	APL-24	1944	Barracks CRF	Fleet Support
Retention - Crane Ship
Grand Canyon State	Pacific	ACS 3	1965	C6-s-MA1qd	Logistics Support
Non-retention - Break Bulk
Cape Bover	Pacific	AK 5057	1966	C4-S-66a	Disposal
Cape Jacob	Pacific	AK 5029	1961	C4-S-1u	Disposal
Non-retention - Barge Ship
Cape Fear	Pacific	AK 5061	1971	C8-S-81b	Disposal
Non-retention - Barge
Peach	Pacific	FB-63	1945	Repair barge	Disposal
Non-retention - Crane Ship
Green Mountain State	Pacific	ACS 9	1965	C6-S-MA60d	disposal
Custody - Other
LCS(L)(3)-102	Pacific	LCS(L)-102	1945	Landing Craft Support	National Registry
Polar Sea	Pacific	WAGB-11	1977	Polar Ice Breaker	USCG
Custody - Military
Millinocket	Pacific	T-EPF 3	2013	High speed catamaran	Navy

=== Notable former ===
- USS Mount Hood (AE-29) – sold for scrap in 2013
- USS Pyro (AE-24)
- USS Tulare (LKA-112)
- USS Bolster (ARS-38)
- USS Clamp (ARS-33)
- USS Pigeon (ASR-21)
- USS Point Defiance (LSD-31)
- USS Sperry (AS-12)
- USS Thomaston (LSD-28)
- USS Vancouver (LPD-2)
- USCGC Glacier (WAGB-4)
- USS Holland (AS-32)
- USS Nereus (AS-17)
- USS Reclaimer (ARS-42)
- USNS Wyman (T-AGS-34)
- USNS Comet (T-AKR-7)
- USNS Meteor (T-AKR-9)
- USS Cimarron (AO-177)
- USNS Hassayampa (T-AO-145)
- USS Kansas City (AOR-3)
- USNS Kawishiwi (T-AO-146)
- USNS Mispillion (T-AO-105)
- USCGC Planetree (WLB-307)
- USNS Ponchatoula (T-AO-148)
- USS Roanoke (AOR-7)
- USNS Shoshone (T-AO-151)
- USS Wabash (AOR-5)
- USS Wichita (AOR-1)
- USS Willamette (AO-180)
- USS Hoga (YTM-146) – moved to Arkansas Inland Maritime Museum as a museum ship
- USS Iowa (BB-61) – moved to the port of Los Angeles as a museum ship
- Sea Shadow (IX-529)
- USCGC Storis (WMEC-38)
- USCGC Iris (WLB 395)
- Glomar Explorer – also known as USNS Hughes Glomar Explorer (T-AG-193) – and later as GSF Explorer

== See also ==
- Naval Inactive Ship Maintenance Facility
- Ready Reserve Force
- Sacramento Deep Water Ship Channel
- Stockton Deepwater Shipping Channel
