= List of ship commissionings in 1976 =

The list of ship commissionings in 1976 includes a chronological list of all ships commissioned in 1976.

	Operator	Ship	Flag	Class and type	Pennant	Other notes
21 February	United States Navy	Paul F. Foster		Spruance-class destroyer	DD-964	
24 March	Olau Line	Olau Finn	Finland	Ferry		Former Finnpartner with Finnlines
15 April	Tor Line	Tor Scandinavia	Sweden	Cruiseferry		
3 June	Royal Netherlands Navy	De Ruyter		Tromp-class frigate	F806	
June	Steamship Company Bore	Bore Star	Finland	Ferry		In Silja Line traffic after charter to Finnlines
8 July	United States Navy	O'Brien		Spruance-class destroyer	DD-975	
11 September	United States Navy	Virginia		Virginia-class cruiser		
25 September	United States Navy	Hewitt		Spruance-class destroyer	DD-966	
30 October	United States Navy	Roanoke		Wichita-class replenishment oiler	AOR-7	
13 November	United States Navy	Los Angeles		Los Angeles-class submarine	SSN-688	
30 November	Soviet Navy	Vasily Chapaev		Project 1134A Berkut A large anti-submarine ship	570	
November	Finnlines	Bore Star	Finland	Ferry		Chartered from Steamship Company Bore. Marketed as Finnpartner
1 December	United States Navy	Tarawa		Tarawa-class amphibious assault ship	LHA-1	
