= USS Savannah (AOR-4) =

Oiler of the United States Navy

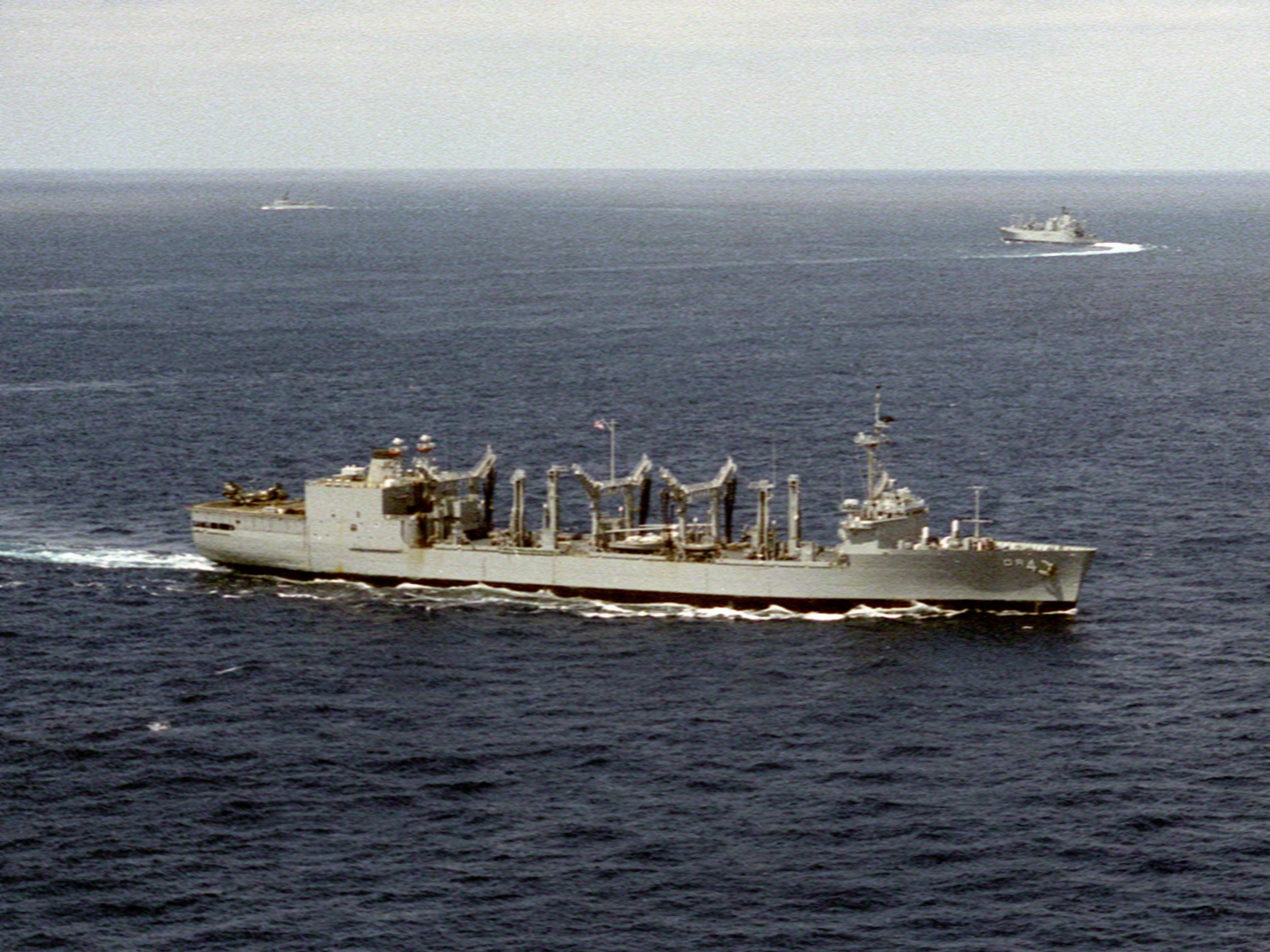
- USS Savannah (AOR-4) underway in 1986

History

United States
- Name: USS Savannah
- Namesake: Savannah, Georgia
- Builder: General Dynamics Corp., Quincy, Massachusetts
- Laid down: 22 January 1969
- Launched: 23 April 1970
- Commissioned: 5 December 1970
- Decommissioned: 28 July 1995
- Stricken: 29 October 1998
- Identification: IMO number: 8644175
- Motto: We Never Stop Pumping
- Nickname(s): Savvy Sue
- Honors and awards: 1 battle star & Meritorious Unit Commendation (Vietnam)
- Fate: Scrapped, 2009

General characteristics
- Class & type: Wichita-class replenishment oiler
- Displacement: 40,100 long tons (40,743 t) full
- Length: 659 ft (201 m)
- Beam: 96 ft (29 m)
- Draft: 35 ft (11 m)
- Propulsion: 3 × boilers, steam turbines, 2 × shafts, 32,000 shp (23,862 kW)
- Speed: 25 knots (46 km/h; 29 mph)
- Complement: 22 officers, 398 enlisted
- Armament: 2 × Phalanx CIWS; 1 × Mark 29 Sea Sparrow missile launcher
- Aircraft carried: 2 × CH-46 Sea Knight helicopters

USS Savannah (AOR-4), was a Wichita-class replenishment oiler of the United States Navy. The fifth Savannah was laid down on 22 January 1969 by the General Dynamics Quincy Shipbuilding Division at Quincy, Massachusetts, launched on 23 April 1970, sponsored by Mrs. Ralph L. Shifley, wife of Vice Admiral R. L. Shifley, Deputy Chief of Naval Operations, and commissioned on 5 December 1970.

== Service history ==
=== 1970–1974 ===
After shakedown out of Guantanamo Bay, Savannah proceeded to her homeport at Norfolk, Virginia. Arriving on 12 May, she completed post-shakedown availability on 9 August, and prepared for deployment to the Mediterranean.

Savannah (AOR-4) left Norfolk on 20 September. En route to Rota, Spain, she refueled ships taking part in a Caribbean exercise. After reporting to the 6th Fleet on 8 October, Savannah operated in Task Group 60.1. By the end of the year, she had replenished 178 ships.

Savannah continued to operate with the 6th Fleet in the Mediterranean until early March 1972. On 9 March, she headed west for Norfolk and arrived there eight days later. Her stay in the United States, however, was cut short by the exigencies of the Vietnam War. On 25 April, she left the Chesapeake Bay and, four days later, transited the Panama Canal. Savannah arrived in Subic Bay, Philippines, on 20 May and began a five-month tour replenishing the fleet along the coast of Vietnam. She made six line swings to the Gulf of Tonkin during this time. Each swing was punctuated by a 4–6-day load out period in Subic Bay.

Savannah departed Subic Bay on 5 November, bound for Norfolk. She transited the Panama Canal on 4 December and arrived at Norfolk on the 8th. Savannah operated out of Norfolk, along the Atlantic seaboard and in the Caribbean, for almost all of 1973. On 3 December 1973, she again headed eastward to join the 6th Fleet in the Mediterranean. From 12 December until late May 1974, she supported units of the 6th Fleet in the Mediterranean. On 3 June 1974, she returned to Norfolk.

=== 1974–1995 ===
Savannah was back in the Med in 1975 supporting the USS John F Kennedy (CV-67).

From December 1976 to August 1977 the ship was laid up at the Brooklyn Navy Yard, for restructuring of her aft section. The 3"/50 calibre dual mounts were replaced by hangars for a pair of CH-46D Sea Knight helicopters. The ship visited the Brooklyn Navy Yard again in 1980–1981, which saw the installation of a Sea Sparrow missile system and Phalanx CIWS.

In 1982, Savannah underwent her second major overhaul from 2 March to 15 December. After exiting the shipyard she steamed into the Caribbean, where she served as a drone launch platform in April 1982. On 10 December, Savannah resumed her support of 6th Fleet vessels in the Mediterranean. She subsequently transited the Suez Canal on 31 January 1983 and conducted operations in the Indian Ocean from 4 February to 26 April. The Navy Expeditionary Medal she earned for Lebanon reflects operations she conducted in support of the Multinational Force in Lebanon during this period. Savannah spent the remainder of the 1980s alternating deployments off the Atlantic coast with Mediterranean voyages.

The year 1990 saw one of Savannah's most lengthy deployments in support of the 6th Fleet. On 8 March she steamed out of Norfolk en route to Rota, Spain. From 14 June to 2 August, Savannah participated in Operation Sharp Edge, the non-combatant evacuation operation of American citizens and foreign nationals from Liberia during the First Liberian Civil War. She subsequently supported the build-up of American forces in the Persian Gulf as part of Operation Desert Shield and Operation Desert Storm.

From 2 December 1991 to 6 June 1992 the ship deployed to the Mediterranean Sea and Indian Ocean with the USS America (CV-66) carrier group.

From 11 August 1993 to 5 February 1994 the ship deployed to the Mediterranean Sea, including a trip with the USS America carrier group through the Suez Canal to the Indian Ocean on 1 November 1993 in support of U.N. efforts in Somalia.

== Decommissioning and sale ==
Savannah was decommissioned on 28 July 1995, at Norfolk, Virginia, moored at the former Naval Shipyard in Philadelphia for a few years and finally laid up in the National Defense Reserve Fleet, James River, Fort Eustis, Virginia. The ship was struck from the Naval Register on 29 October 1998, and transferred to the Maritime Administration for disposal. On 27 January 2009, the Department of Transportation signed a fee for service contract worth $515,726 with ESCO Marine of Brownsville, Texas, to scrap ex-Savannah.

The scrapping of the Savannah was featured on the television show Break It Down which aired on 8 July 2010 on the National Geographic Channel. Extensive footage of the ship was featured, chronicling the struggles with removing toxic items like asbestos before salvaging and cut up.

== Awards and decorations ==
Savannah earned several awards for service in the 1970s–1990s:

Joint Meritorious Unit Award 1990
Meritorious Unit Commendation (3); 1972, 1987, 1990	Navy E Ribbon (4); 1985, 1986, 1989, 1994	Navy Expeditionary Medal; Lebanon (1983)
National Defense Service Medal (2)	Armed Forces Expeditionary Medal (2); Operation Restore Hope Somalia; Operation Uphold Democracy Haiti	Vietnam Service Medal; Cease-fire period (1972)
Southwest Asia Service Medal 1992	Kuwait Liberation Medal (Kuwait) 1990	Vietnam Campaign Medal
