= USS Kalamazoo (AOR-6) =

Oiler of the United States Navy

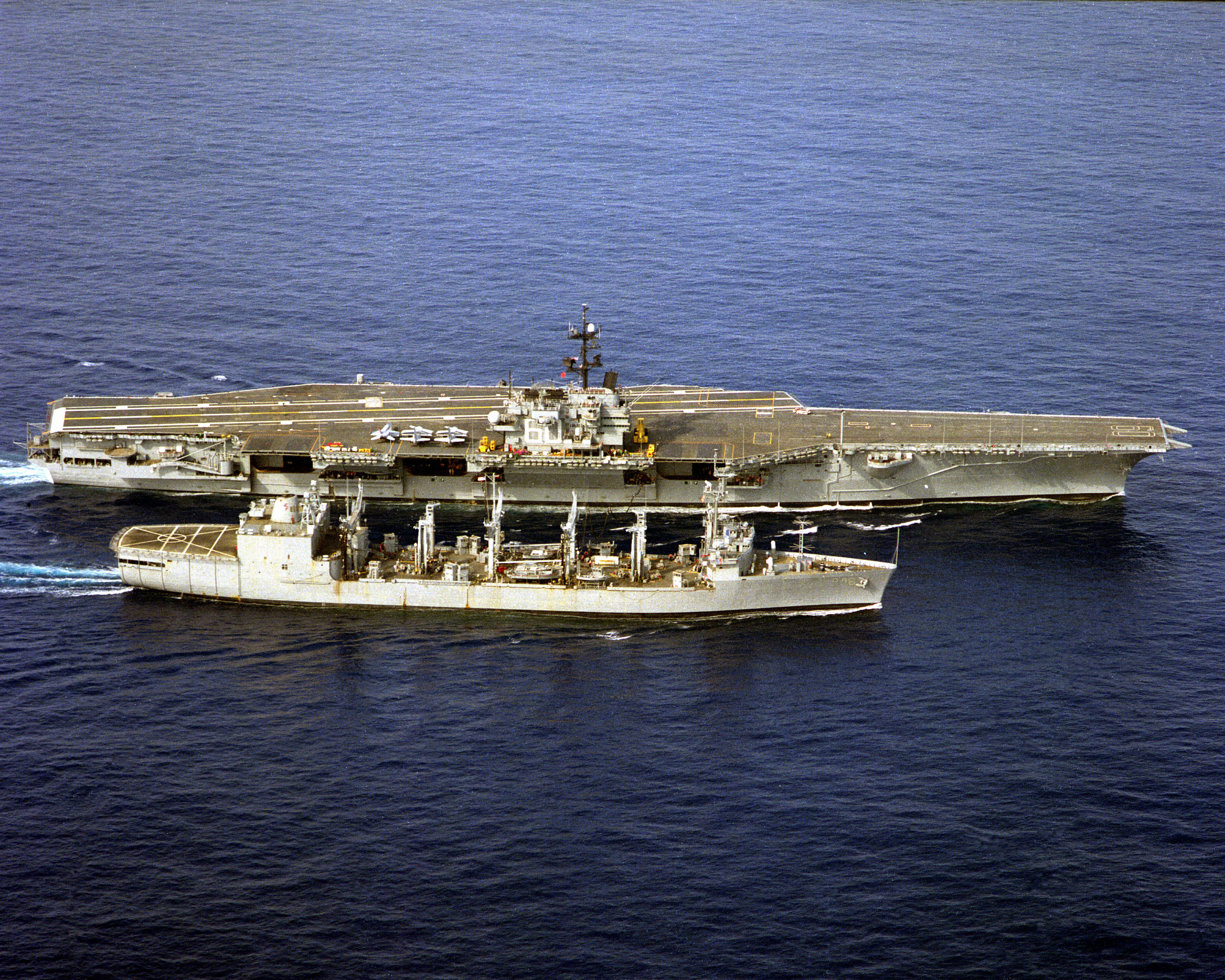
- USS Kalamazoo in underway replenishment with USS Saratoga.

History

United States
- Name: USS Kalamazoo
- Namesake: Kalamazoo, Michigan and the Kalamazoo River
- Builder: General Dynamics Corporation, Quincy, Massachusetts
- Laid down: 1 October 1970
- Launched: 1 November 1972
- Commissioned: 11 August 1973, as USS Kalamazoo (AOR-6)
- Decommissioned: 16 August 1996
- Stricken: 29 October 1998
- Identification: IMO number: 8644084
- Motto: KZOO Can Do
- Nickname(s): The Zoo
- Honors and awards: Joint Meritorious Unit Award
- Fate: Sold for scrap, 15 July 2008, for $1,465,726

General characteristics
- Class & type: Wichita-class replenishment oiler
- Displacement: 14,048 long tons (14,273 t) light; 39,790 long tons (40,429 t) full
- Length: 659 ft (201 m)
- Beam: 96 ft (29 m)
- Draft: 37 ft (11 m)
- Propulsion: 3 × boilers, 2 × steam turbines, 2 × shafts, 32,000 shp (23,862 kW)
- Speed: 20 knots (37 km/h; 23 mph)
- Complement: 34 officers, 463 enlisted
- Armament: 2 × Phalanx CIWS; 1 × Sea Sparrow missile system (NSSMS)
- Aircraft carried: 2 × CH-46 Sea Knight helicopters
- Aviation facilities: Helo Deck and berthing for 8 Airdet Personnel

USS Kalamazoo (AOR-6) was a Wichita-class replenishment oiler commissioned by the United States Navy in 1973. She continued to support Navy requirements until 1996 when she was placed in the reserve fleet and later struck.

== Construction ==
Kalamazoo was laid down on 1 October 1970 and launched on 1 November 1972 at the shipyard of the General Dynamics Corporation, Quincy, Massachusetts. On 11 August 1973 she was commissioned USS Kalamazoo (AOR-6) and placed into service for the fleet. Her first homeport was Mayport Naval Station, Mayport, Florida.

== Service history ==
Date	to Date	Deployment or event
11 August 1973	–	Commissioned
June 1974	February 1975	Mediterranean
January 1975	December 1975	Marjorie Sterrett Battleship Fund Award Atlantic Fleet Winner
April 1975	October 1975	Blue Nose – Arctic Circle
July 1976	July 1976	New York Harbor Tall Ships Celebration
January 1977	August 1977	Mediterranean
Sept 1978	May 1979	Regular overhaul
April 1980	October 1980	Mediterranean-Indian Ocean
8 October 1981	–	Line-crossing ceremony, 0 meridian, Emerald Shellback Initiation – Atlantic Ocean
October 1981	April 1982	Mediterranean-West Africa
November 1982	May 1983	Mediterranean
December 1983	June 1984	Overhaul – Hoboken N.J.
May 1985	December 1985	Mediterranean-Lebanon
August 1986	October 1986	North Atlantic: Blue Nose
December 1986	June 1987	Mediterranean
December 1988	June 1989	Mediterranean: This was called "The Unexpected Cruise". The Kzoo was unexpectedly placed into rotation for deployment after the USS Detroit (AOE-4) was unable to make her scheduled deployment.
December 1989	May 1990	Caribbean (Guantanamo Bay, Puerto Rico and joint anti-smuggling LEO Ops (law enforcement operations) with the US Coast Guard.
December 1990	June 1991	"Operation Desert Storm"
October 1992	April 1993	Mediterranean
May 1994	November 1994	Mediterranean-Indian Ocean-Persian Gulf
16 August 1996	–	Decommissioned

== Decommissioning ==
On 16 August 1996 Kalamazoo was decommissioned and placed in reserve at the National Defense Reserve Fleet, James River, Lee Hall, Virginia. She was struck from the Navy Directory on 29 October 1998 and, on 15 July 2008, she was sold by the U.S. Maritime Administration to Esco Marine, Brownsville, Texas, for $1,465,726. Kalamazoo was towed out of James River Reserve Fleet on Tuesday, 30 September 2008, en route to ESCO Brownsville.

== Honors and awards ==
Qualified Kalamazoo personnel were authorized the following:

- Joint Meritorious Unit Award
- Navy Unit Commendation
- Navy Meritorious Unit Commendation
- Navy Battle "E" Ribbon (2)
- Navy Expeditionary Medal (1-Iran/Indian Ocean, 5-Lebanon)
- National Defense Service Medal with star
- Southwest Asia Service Medal with three stars

== See also ==
- United States Navy
- Replenishment oiler
