= AOR-2 =

AOR-2 may refer to:

- USS Milwaukee (AOR-2), a former warship of the United States Navy
- AOR-2, a military camouflage pattern used on uniforms by the U.S. Navy
