= AOR-1 =

AOR-1 may refer to:

- USS Wichita (AOR-1)
- AOR-1, a camouflage pattern used on the U.S. Navy Working Uniform
