= USS Milwaukee (AOR-2) =

Oiler of the United States Navy

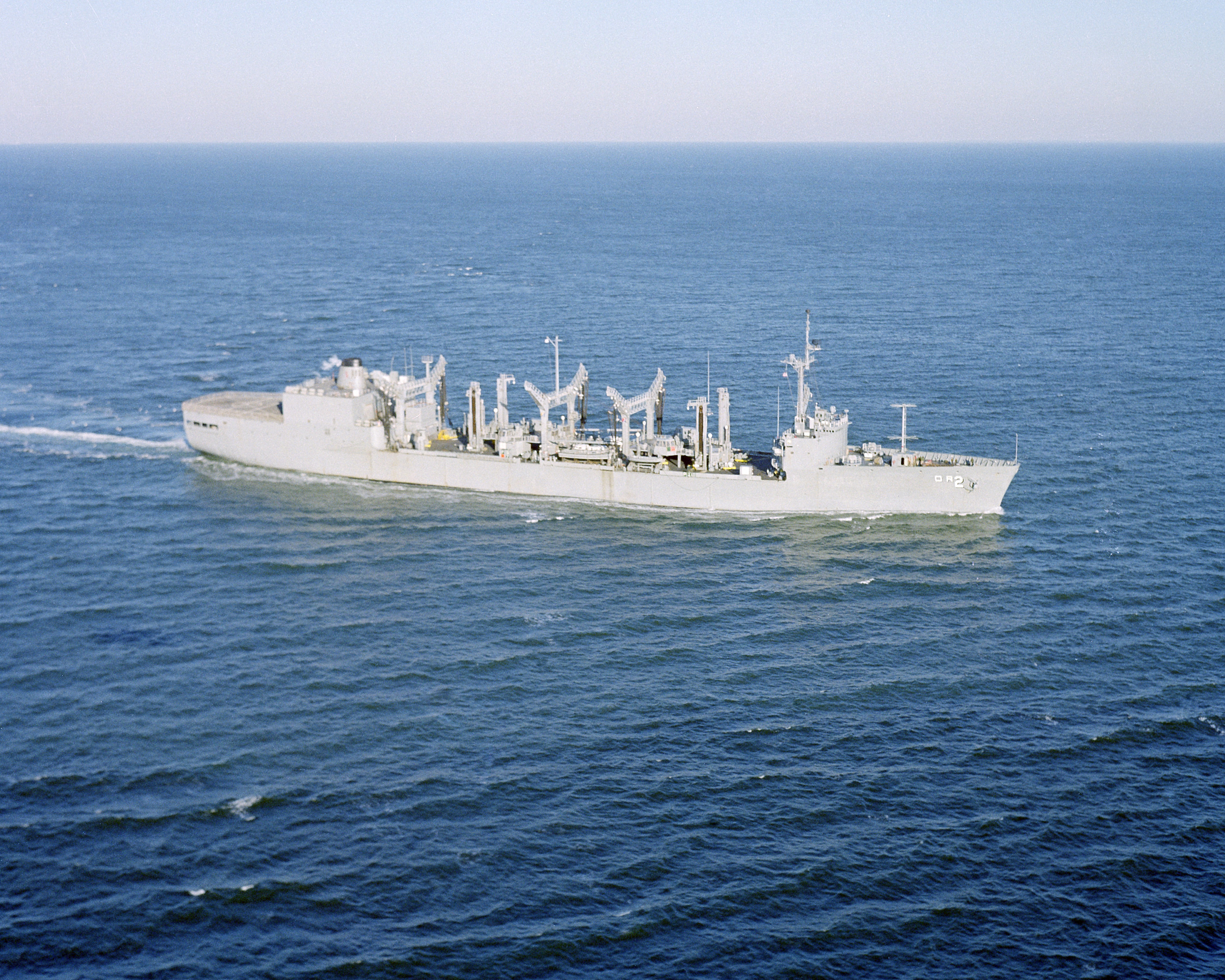
- USS Milwaukee in March 1982

History

United States
- Name: USS Milwaukee
- Namesake: The city of Milwaukee, Wisconsin and the Milwaukee River
- Builder: General Dynamics Corporation, Quincy, Massachusetts
- Laid down: 29 November 1966
- Launched: 1 January 1969
- Commissioned: 1 November 1969
- Decommissioned: 27 January 1994
- Stricken: 8 April 1997
- Identification: IMO number: 8644113
- Fate: Scrapped, 2009

General characteristics
- Class & type: Wichita-class replenishment oiler
- Displacement: 14,048 long tons (14,273 t) light; 39,790 long tons (40,429 t) full
- Length: 659 ft (201 m)
- Beam: 96 ft (29 m)
- Draft: 37 ft (11 m)
- Propulsion: 3 × boilers, 2 × steam turbines, 2 × shafts, 32,000 shp (23,862 kW)
- Speed: 20 knots (37 km/h; 23 mph)
- Complement: 34 Officers, 463 Enlisted
- Armament: 2 × Phalanx CIWS; 1 × Sea Sparrow missile system (NSSMS)
- Aircraft carried: 2 × CH-46 Sea Knight helicopters
- Aviation facilities: Helo Deck and berthing for 8 Airdet Personnel

USS Milwaukee (AOR-2) was a Wichita-class replenishment oiler commissioned by the U.S. Navy in 1969. She continued to support Navy requirements until 1994 when she was placed in the reserve fleet and later struck.

== History ==
Milwaukee was laid down on 29 November 1966 and launched on 1 January 1969 at the shipyard of the General Dynamics Corporation, Quincy, Massachusetts. On 1 November 1969 she was commissioned USS Milwaukee (AOR-2) and placed into service for the fleet.

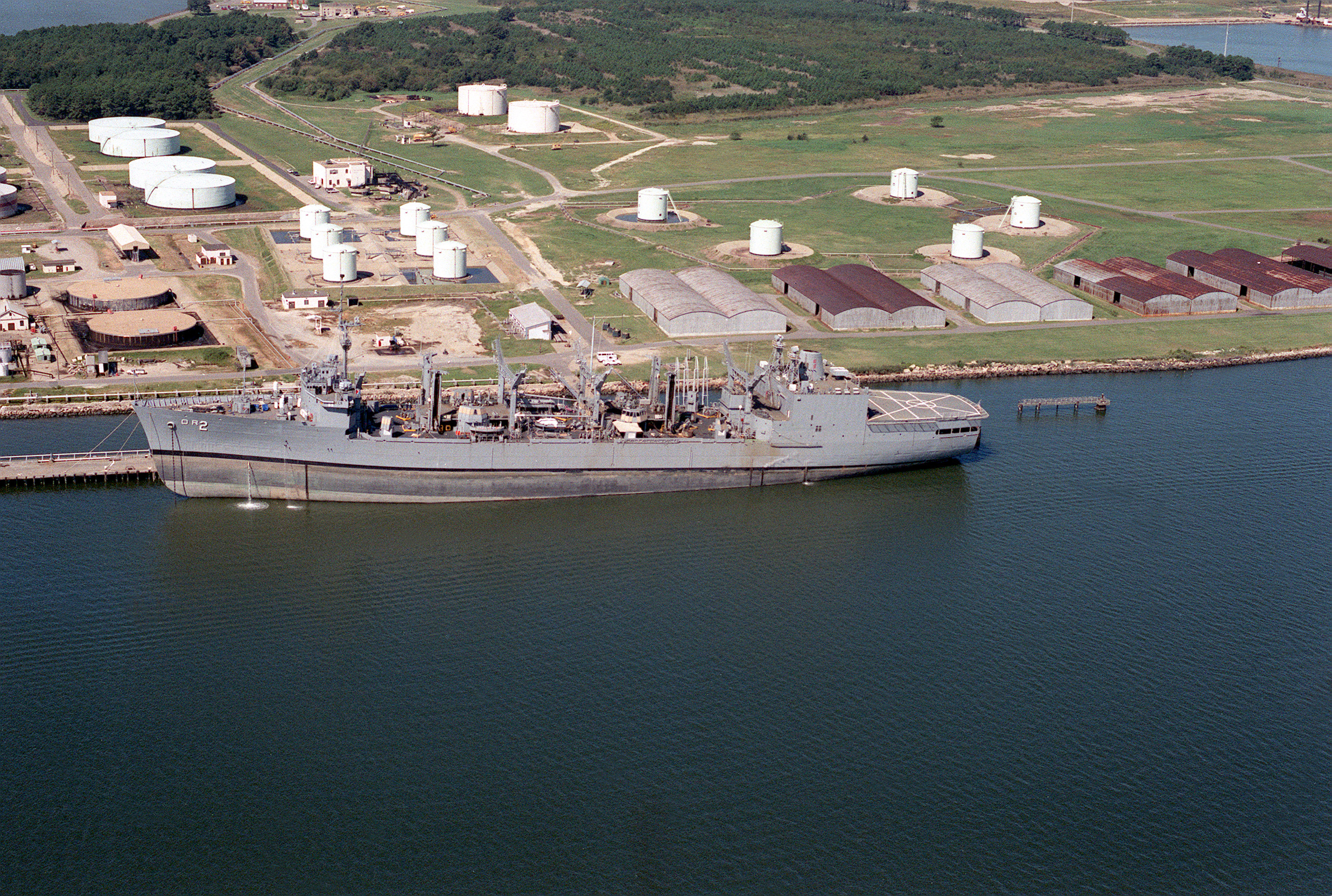
USS Milwaukee taking on fuel at Craney Island, Virginia, United States, on 25 September 1990.

=== Operational service ===
During the Vietnam War USS Milwaukee participated in operation Vietnam Ceasefire from 12 November 1972 through 20 February 1973. Milwaukee earned one campaign star for Vietnam War service.

In September 1976, returning from a routine deployment, Milwaukee along with Sylvania had the honor of transporting the world-famous King Tutankhamun Exhibition to the United States for the Metropolitan Museum of Art in New York City.

In September and October 1977 Milwaukee sailed on separate 3-week deployments to the Caribbean Sea in support of Atlantic Fleet exercises, with port calls at Roosevelt Roads, Puerto Rico and St. Thomas, U.S. Virgin Islands.

On 1 March 1980 the Malaysian oil tanker Santo Prestige lost power and collided with Milwaukee which was moored in Norfolk, Virginia. The collision results in a 40-by-15-foot (12.2 by 4.6 m) gash in the hull of Milwaukee.

In 1985 Milwaukee participated in the anti-submarine exercise Arctic Sharem.

=== Decommissioning ===
On 27 January 1994 Milwaukee was decommissioned and struck from the Naval Vessel Register on 8 April 1997. On 15 January 2009, Milwaukee was sold for $56,410 for scrapping to Bay Bridge Enterprises, Chesapeake, Virginia.
