= SS Grand Canyon State =

US Navy reserve crane ship

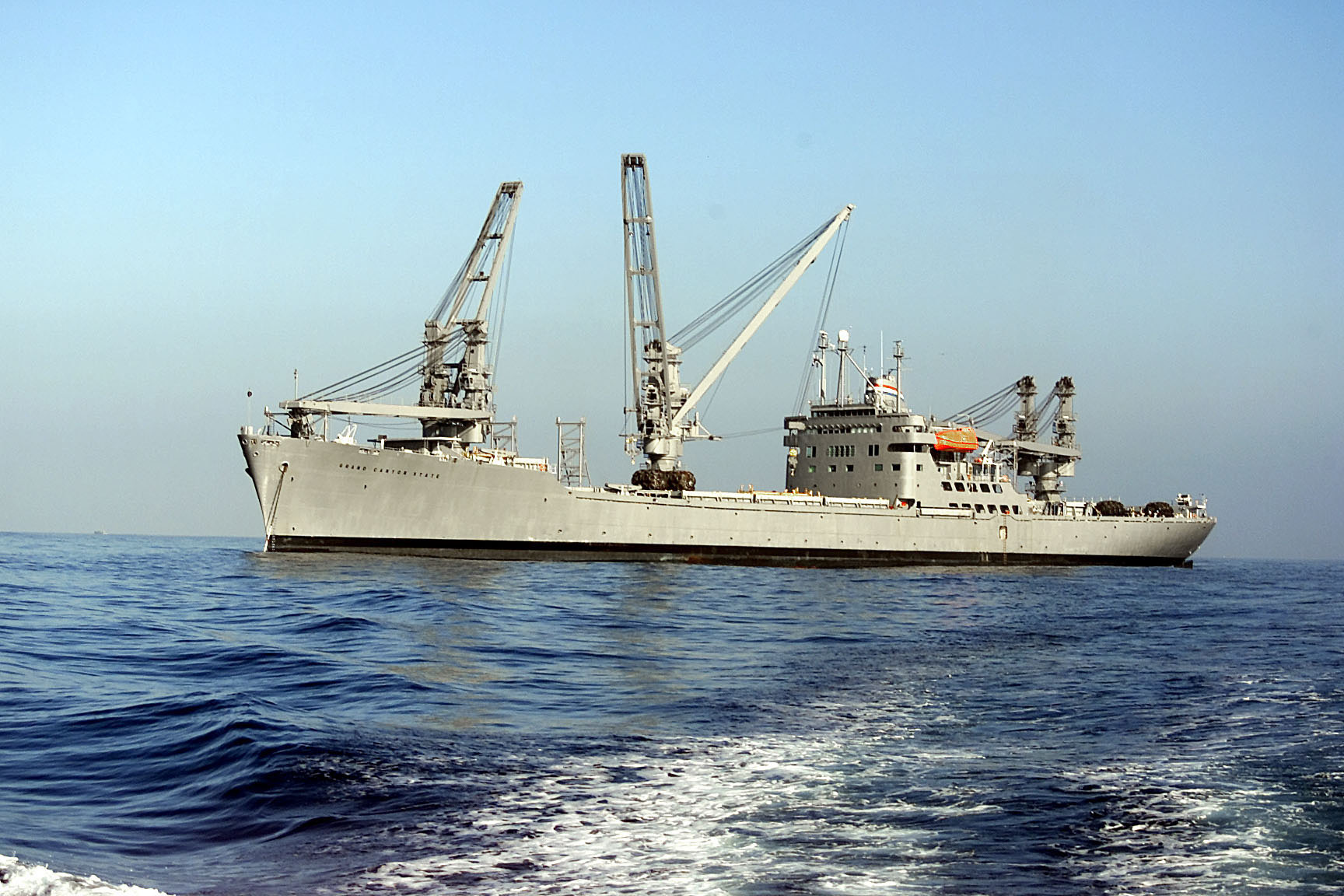
- Grand Canyon State

History

United States
- Name: SS Grand Canyon State
- Builder: National Steel and Shipbuilding, San Diego, CA
- Laid down: 20 March 1964
- Launched: 23 January 1965
- Acquired: 4 November 1965
- In service: 4 March 1965
- Home port: Alameda, CA
- Identification: IMO number: 6510899; MMSI number: 368916000; Callsign: WNEI
- Fate: Suisun Bay Reserve Fleet
- Status: In inactive reserve since 2020.
- Notes: Launched as SS President Polk

General characteristics
- Class & type: Keystone State-class crane ship
- Displacement: 31,500 tons
- Length: 668 ft 5 in (203.73 m)
- Beam: 76 ft 1 in (23.19 m)
- Draft: 33 ft 6 in (10.21 m)
- Propulsion: two boilers, two steam turbines, single propeller, 17,500shp
- Speed: 17 kn (20 mph; 31 km/h)
- Capacity: 300+ Cargo Containers
- Complement: Full Operational Status: 37 civilian mariners Reduced Operational Status: 10 civilian mariners
- Armament: None
- Aviation facilities: None

SS Grand Canyon State (T-ACS-3) is a crane ship in ready reserve for the United States Navy. The ship was named for the state of Arizona, which is also known as the Grand Canyon State.

== History ==
Grand Canyon State was laid down on 20 March 1964, as the combination breakbulk-container ship SS President Polk, ON 500484, IMO 6510899, a Maritime Administration type (C4-S-1aq) hull under MARAD contract (MA 164). Built by National Steel and Shipbuilding, San Diego, CA, hull no. 338, she was launched on 23 January 1965, and delivered to MARAD on 4 November 1965, for service with American President Lines. She was converted to a MARAD type (C6-S-1qc) container ship, in 1973, and continued to be operated by APL until delivered to the Maritime Administration in 1982 for lay up in the National Defense Reserve Fleet (NDRF). In 1985-1987 she was converted to a type (C6-S-MA1qd) Crane Ship by Dillingham Corporation, San Francisco, CA. She was placed in service as SS Grand Canyon State (ACS-3) 27 October 1987, assigned to the Military Sealift Command (MSC) Ready Reserve Force, (RRF). The Grand Canyon State was assigned to the Maritime Propositioning Squadron Three and maintained a 5-day readiness status (ROS-5) at Ready Reserve Fleet Alameda. In 2020 she was reassigned to the Suisun Bay Reserve Fleet.
