= Wichita-class replenishment oiler =

Of the US Navy

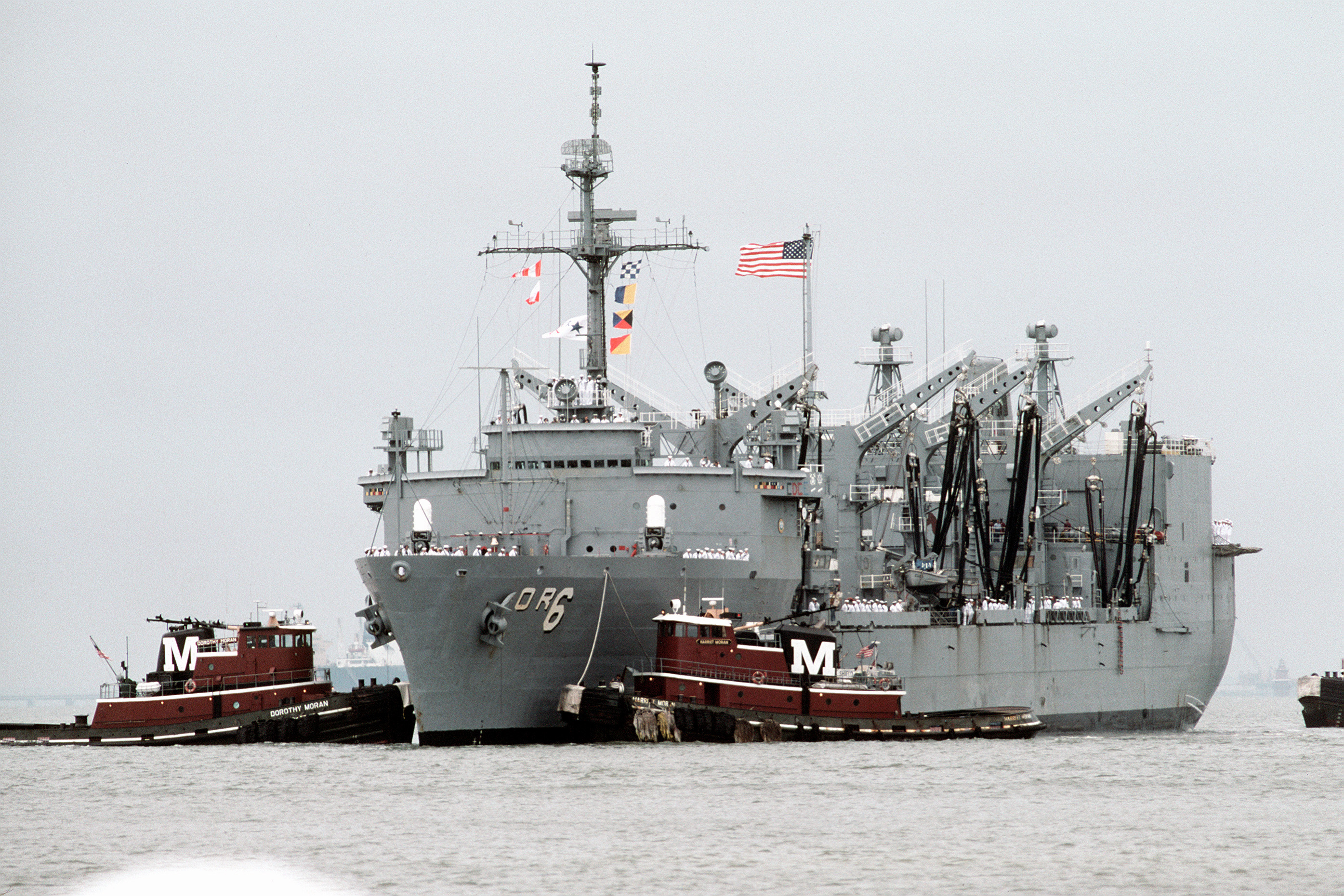
- USS Kalamazoo on 1 April 1991

Class overview
- Name: Wichita
- Builders: General Dynamics, Quincy; National Steel, San Diego
- Operators: United States Navy
- Preceded by: Neosho class; Sacramento class; Ashtabula class
- Succeeded by: Supply class; Cimarron class
- In commission: 1969–1995
- Planned: 7
- Completed: 7
- Retired: 7

General characteristics
- Type: replenishment oiler
- Displacement: 13,533 tons empty, 40,151 tons full; 26,618 dwt
- Length: 640 ft (195 m) wl; 659 ft (201 m) oa
- Beam: 96 ft (29 m)
- Draft: 35 ft (10.6 m)
- Propulsion: 3 × boilers, 2 × steam turbines, 2 × shafts, 32,000 SHP (24 MW)
- Speed: 20 knots
- Complement: 34 officers, 463 men
- Armament: (As built) 2 × twin 3 in (76 mm) AA guns; (as decommissioned) 1 × NATO Sea Sparrow missile system, 2 × Phalanx CIWS
- Aircraft carried: 2 × UH-46 Sea Knight helicopters

Wichita-class replenishment oilers comprised a class of seven replenishment oilers used by the United States Navy from the late 1960s to the mid-1990s. The ships were designed for rapid underway replenishment using both connected replenishment and vertical replenishment.

== Design ==
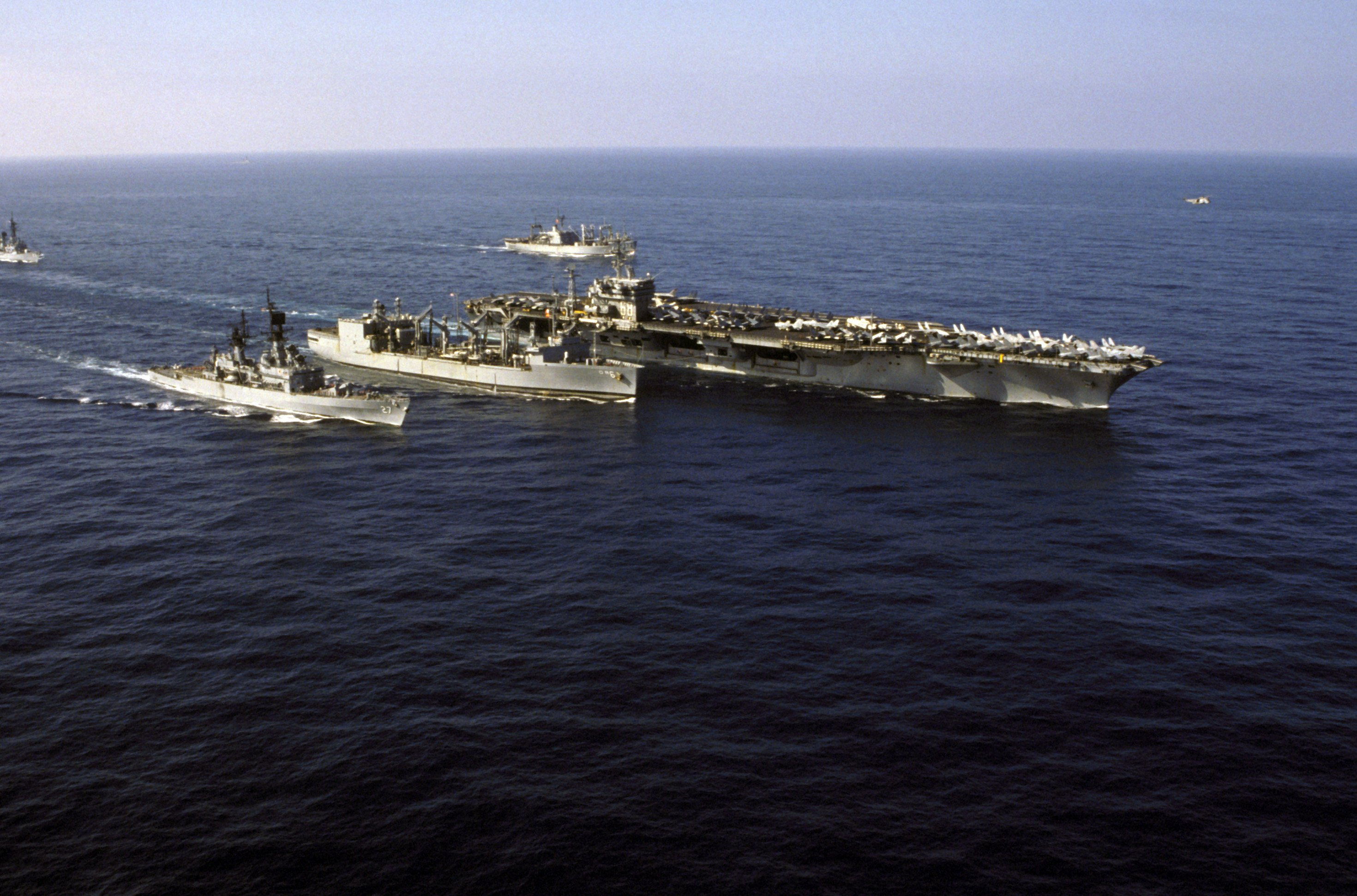
Kalamazoo replenishing USS Nimitz and USS Josephus Daniels, in 1987.

The original concept for the Wichita-class was that the ships would serve the same function for the anti-submarine carrier (CVS) groups that the larger, faster Sacramento-class ships did for the attack carrier (CVA) groups. During this time the ships were commissioned naval auxiliaries with the hull classification AOR.

The ships could carry 160,000 barrels (25,438,000 litres) of fuel oil (DFM) and/or jet fuel (JP5), 600 tons of munitions, 200 tons of dry stores and 100 tons of refrigerated stores. To transfer cargo, the ships were equipped with four fueling stations and two cargo handling stations on the port side and three fueling stations and two cargo handling stations on the starboard side. As built the port forward fuel station and associated tanks were for aviation gasoline (AVGAS), but were converted after the retirement of the Navy's last piston-engined aircraft. Originally, the first six ships only had a large helicopter landing deck aft, but no hangar. Roanoke was the first ship equipped with a large double hangar for two UH-46 Sea Knight helicopters. The hangar was later retrofitted to the other ships.

With the addition of the hangar, the ships lost the originally fitted 3"/50 caliber gun twin mounts that were located abaft the stack. In the 1980s, a Mk 29 launcher for the NATO Sea Sparrow was fitted atop the hangar, and two Phalanx CIWS were added.

General Dynamics, Quincy originally encountered problems during the construction, before the production was rationalised. Wichita took 24 months from keel laying to launch, Milwaukee 21 month, and Kansas City only 14 months.

With the reduction in the U.S. Navy fleet, these ships were all decommissioned and stricken from the Naval Vessel Register (NVR) in the 1990s.

== Ships in class ==
Traditionally Navy oilers have been named for rivers; the Wichita class were named for city/river pairs with Native American names.

Ship	Hull No.	Builder	Home Port	Commissioned– Decommissioned	Fate	NVR page
Wichita	AOR-1	General Dynamics, Quincy	Oakland	1969–1993	scrapped, 2013	AOR-1
Milwaukee	AOR-2	General Dynamics, Quincy	Norfolk	1969–1994	scrapped, 2009	AOR-2
Kansas City	AOR-3	General Dynamics, Quincy	Oakland	1970–1994	scrapped, 2014	AOR-3
Savannah	AOR-4	General Dynamics, Quincy	Norfolk	1970–1995	scrapped, 2009	AOR-4
Wabash	AOR-5	General Dynamics, Quincy	Long Beach	1971–1994	scrapped, 2013	AOR-5
Kalamazoo	AOR-6	General Dynamics, Quincy	Norfolk	1973–1996	scrapped, 2009	AOR-6
Roanoke	AOR-7	National Steel	Long Beach	1976–1995	scrapped, 2013	AOR-7
