= USS Kansas City (AOR-3) =

Oiler of the United States Navy

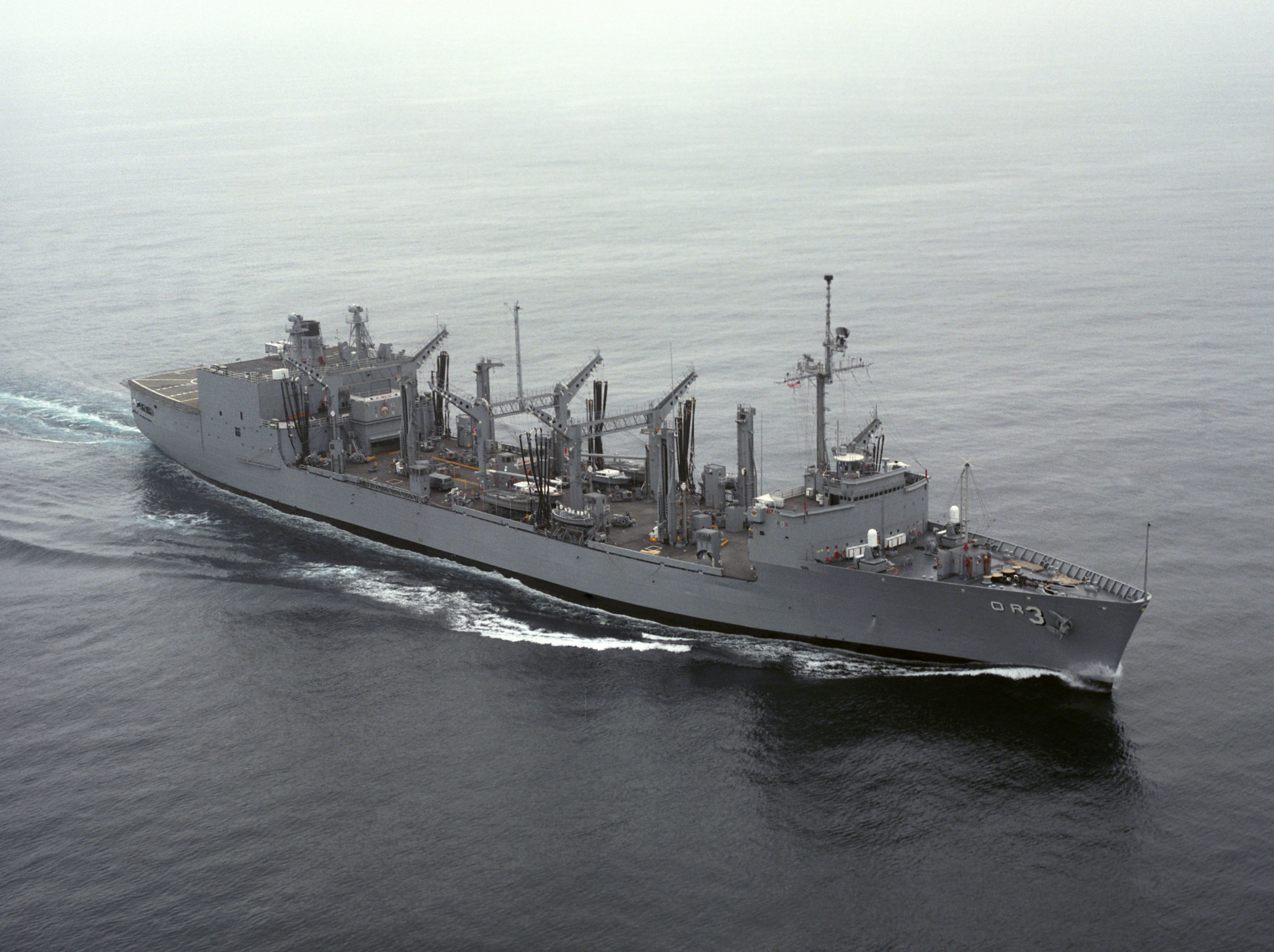

History

United States
- Name: USS Kansas City
- Namesake: Kansas City, Missouri
- Awarded: 6 July 1966
- Builder: General Dynamics, Quincy, Massachusetts
- Laid down: 20 April 1968
- Launched: 28 June 1969
- Commissioned: 6 June 1970
- Decommissioned: 7 October 1994
- Stricken: July 1997
- Identification: IMO number: 8644096
- Honours and awards: Meritorious Unit Commendation and 3 campaign stars (Vietnam)
- Fate: Broken up at All Star Metals Brownsville Texas 2013

General characteristics
- Class & type: Wichita-class replenishment oiler
- Displacement: 40,100 long tons (40,743 t) full
- Length: 659 ft (201 m)
- Beam: 96 ft (29 m)
- Draft: 35 ft (11 m)
- Propulsion: 3 × boilers, steam turbines, 2 × shafts, 32,000 shp (23,862 kW)
- Speed: 20 knots (37 km/h; 23 mph)
- Complement: 22 officers, 398 enlisted
- Armament: 2 × Phalanx CIWS; 4 x Mk2 50 cal machine guns fore and aft 2 x m60 machine gun forward; 1 × Mark 29 Sea Sparrow missile launcher
- Aircraft carried: 2 × CH-46 Sea Knight helicopters

USS Kansas City (AOR-3) was the third of the Wichita-class replenishment oilers. She was the second ship to be named for the city of Kansas City, Missouri.

The keel was laid on 18 April 1968 at the Fore River Shipyard in Quincy, Massachusetts, and the ship was launched on 1 June 1969. The ship was commissioned on 6 June 1970 and saw service in the Vietnam War and Gulf Wars. Subsequently, the ship was decommissioned on 7 October 1994, and was stricken from the Naval Vessel Register on 8 April 1997. In 2013 she was broken up at All Star Metals, Brownsville, Texas .

== Awards ==
- Navy Unit Commendation (Battle Group Echo in Operation Desert Storm)
- Meritorious Unit Commendation
- National Defense Service Medal with star
- Vietnam Campaign Medal with three battle stars
- Southwest Asia Service Medal
