= USNS Sea Lift =

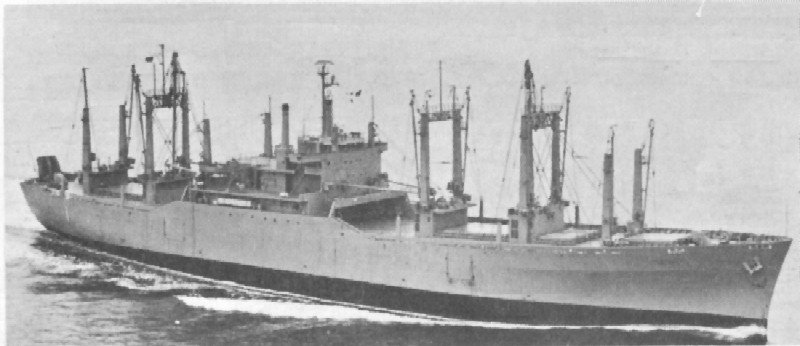
- USNS Sea Lift (T-LSV-9) underway, date and location unknown.

History

United States
- Name: USNS Sea Lift (T-LSV-9)
- Builder: Lockheed Shipbuilding and Construction Company of Seattle, Washington
- Laid down: 18 May 1964
- Launched: 17 April 1965
- In service: 19 May 1967
- Out of service: 25 July 2006
- Renamed: USNS Meteor (T-AKR-9) on 12 September 1975
- Reclassified: USNS Sea Lift (T-AKR-9) on 14 August 1969
- Stricken: January 2008
- Identification: IMO number: 8450677; MMSI number: 366657000; Callsign: KXEK
- Fate: Scrapped 4 April 2016

General characteristics
- Class & type: Roll-on/roll-off cargo ship
- Displacement: 9,154 tons (light); 21,480 tons (full)
- Length: 540 ft 0 in
- Beam: 83 ft 0 in
- Draft: 24 ft 0 in
- Propulsion: four Combustion Engineering top-fired boilers; two General Electric geared turbines; two shafts
- Speed: 18 knots
- Complement: 56 crew; 12 passengers

USNS Sea Lift (T-LSV-9) was a roll on/roll off (Ro/Ro) cargo ship built for the United States Navy's Military Sea Transportation Service (MSTS), currently the Military Sealift Command (MSC). She became the first ship of Ro/Ro-type to deliver cargo to Vietnam during the war in Indochina.

== Construction ==
She was laid down as SS Sea Lift, a Maritime Administration type (C4-ST-67a) hull under Maritime Administration contract (MA hull 124), on 18 May 1964 by the Lockheed Shipbuilding and Construction Company of Seattle, Washington. It was an improved and enlarged prototype of the USNS Comet (T-AK-269). She was launched on 17 April 1965 and sponsored by Mrs. Warren G. Magnuson. Completed on 25 April 1967; delivered to the Navy's Military Sea Transportation Service and placed in service as USNS Sea Lift (T-LSV-9), a roll-on/roll-off cargo ship, on 19 May 1967 with Captain Robert C. Lindquist, Master. She was manned by a civil service crew.

== Service ==
Sea Lift completed her maiden voyage, Oakland to Honolulu in July 1967, then commenced runs to the Far East with cargo consigned to Vietnam. Since then, Sea Lift, redesignated as vehicle cargo ship AKR-9 on 14 August 1969, continued her primary mission, the transportation of military vehicles, for the Military Sealift Command in the Pacific.

Was named USNS Meteor (T-AKR-9) 12 September 1975 to join the galactic family of other ro/ro ships, USNS Comet, USNS Mercury (T-AKR-10) and USNS Jupiter (T-AKR-11). She was assigned to the Rapid Deployment Force in April, 1980. Reassigned to the MARAD Ready Reserve Force (RRF) 30 October 1985 and berthed at Alameda, California, Meteor lost her USNS destination and became was one of 31 roll-on / roll-off cargo ships and one of the 55 ships in the RRF in the Sealift Office Program. Later, Meteor was laid up at a "layberth" at Oakland, California in 10-day fully ready status (ROS-10).

In August 1990, while berthed in San Pedro, Los Angeles she was activated to take part in the Gulf War and shuttled between the US East Coast via the Mediterranean to Saudi Arabia until the end of the hostilities. She was deactivated in 1991 and underwent repairs at the National Steel and Shipbuilding Co. shipyard. In October 1993, she was again activated for Fuertes Caminos, a nation assistance exercise in Guatemala; later, she took part in exercises off South Korea. In 2003, she served in the Operation Iraqi Freedom.

On 28 July 2006, she was removed from MSC and withdrawn from the RRF by reassignment to the National Defense Reserve Fleet. She was laid up at the Suisun Bay Reserve Fleet near San Francisco.
