= USS Wichita (AOR-1) =

Oiler of the United States Navy

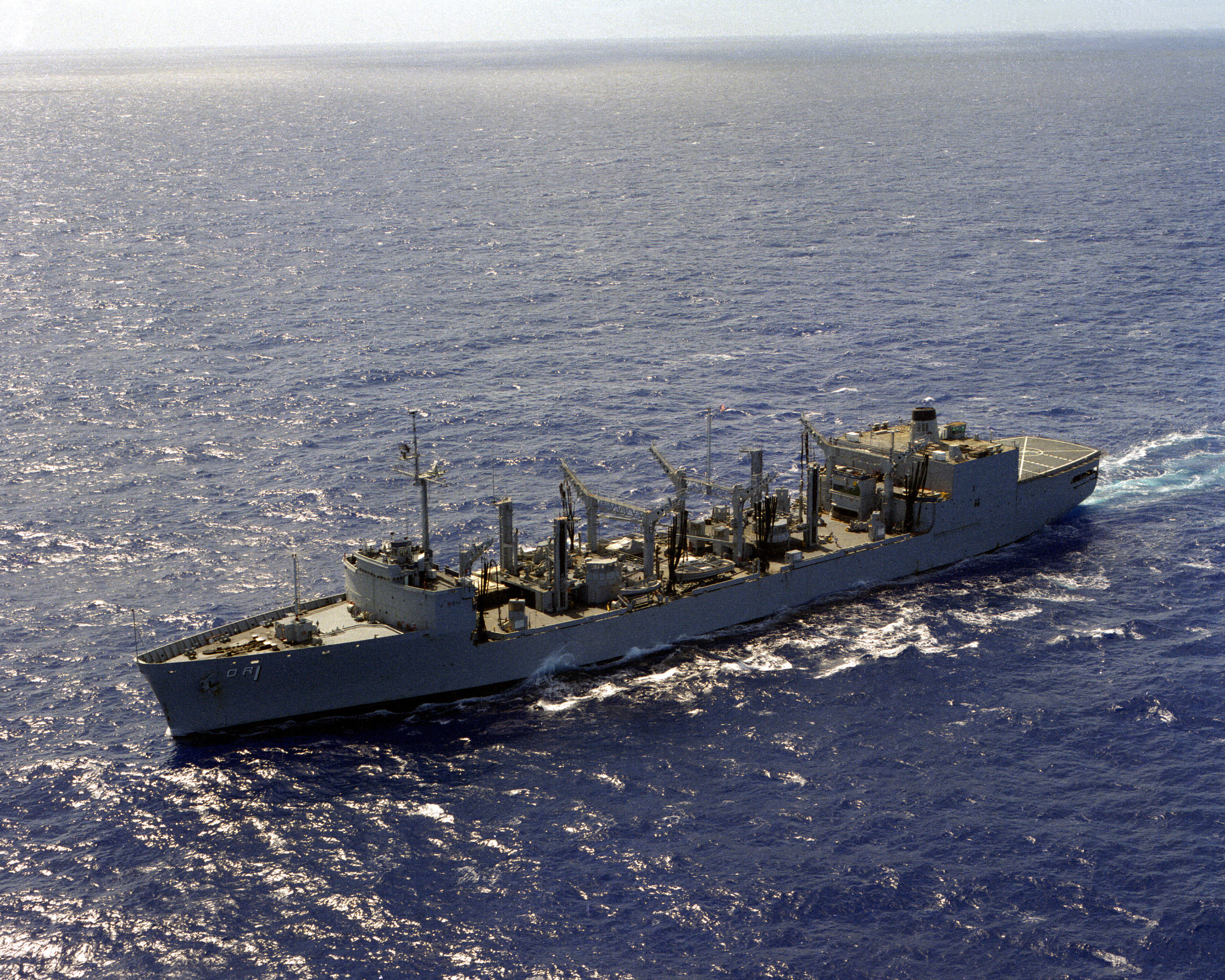
- Wichita in the mid-1980s

History

United States
- Name: USS Wichita
- Namesake: Wichita, Kansas
- Awarded: 2 June 1965
- Builder: General Dynamics Quincy Shipbuilding Division
- Laid down: 16 June 1966
- Launched: 16 March 1968
- Commissioned: 7 June 1969
- Decommissioned: 12 March 1993
- Stricken: 15 February 1995
- Identification: IMO number: 8644230
- Fate: Sold for scrap, 2013

General characteristics
- Class & type: Wichita-class replenishment oiler
- Displacement: 40,100 long tons (40,743 t) full
- Length: 659 ft (201 m)
- Beam: 96 ft (29 m)
- Draft: 35 ft (11 m)
- Propulsion: 3 × boilers, steam turbines, 2 × shafts, 32,000 shp (23,862 kW)
- Speed: 20 knots (37 km/h; 23 mph)
- Complement: 22 officers, 398 enlisted
- Armament: 2 × Phalanx CIWS; 1 × Mark 29 Sea Sparrow missile launcher
- Aircraft carried: 2 × CH-46 Sea Knight helicopters

Service record
- Part of: United States Seventh Fleet
- Operations: Vietnam War
- Awards: 4 battle stars (Vietnam); Battle "E" award; Navy Expeditionary Medal; Humanitarian Service Medal; Armed Forces Expeditionary Medal

USS Wichita (AOR-1) was the lead ship of the Wichita-class replenishment oilers. She was the second ship to be named for the city of Wichita, Kansas.

The second Wichita (AOR-1) was laid down on 16 June 1966 at Quincy, Massachusetts, by the General Dynamics Quincy Shipbuilding Division; launched on 16 March 1968; sponsored by Mrs. Howard B. Yeager; and commissioned on 7 June 1969.

== Service history ==
=== 1969–1974 ===
After fitting out in the Boston Naval Shipyard, Wichita on 17 June sailed for the west coast. Following stops at San Juan, Puerto Rico, and Guantánamo Bay, Cuba, and after transiting the Panama Canal, she arrived at Long Beach, California, her home port, on 19 July. For the next four months, she remained at Long Beach undergoing post construction availability. In December, she got underway to conduct standardization trials, followed by shakedown training. In February 1970, the ship began a two-month post-shakedown availability at Long Beach. In April, she began normal operations out of Long Beach, which included type training and damage control training which kept the ship busy until 22 June, when she began her first deployment to the western Pacific. She changed operational control to Commander, 7th Fleet on Independence Day and arrived in Subic Bay on 11 July. After adjusting her load at Subic, she got underway for her first line period in support of the combat ships operating off the coast of Vietnam. During her first deployment to the western Pacific, Wichita made five separate line swings to replenish the ships operating on Yankee Station. She terminated each at Subic Bay and varied her routine with two liberty calls at Hong Kong. The ship concluded her first deployment when she arrived back in Long Beach on 2 February 1971.

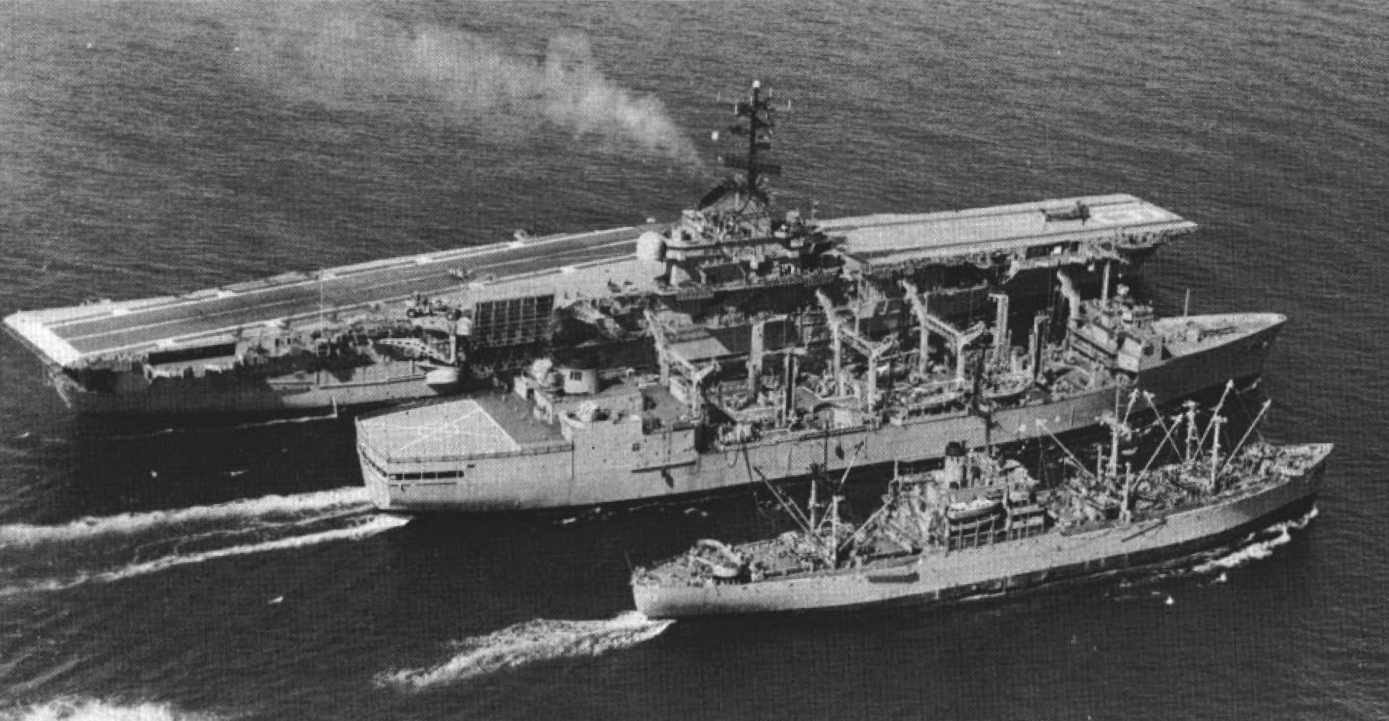
Wichita with USS Lexington, before addition of the hangar.

Wichita spent the next six months engaged in operations out of her home port. These included refresher training, underway replenishments, and port visits to other American and Canadian ports. She also participated as a support ship in the tests conducted on the new Mark 48 torpedo. On 7 August, she departed Long Beach for her second tour of duty with the 7th Fleet. She arrived in Subic Bay on the 24th and embarked upon her first line swing on the 31st. After two periods on station off Vietnam, Wichita visited Sattahip, Thailand, late in October. Two more line periods followed in November and early December. On 10 December, however, she received orders to join Task Force 74, a contingency force bound for the Indian Ocean in the wake of the Indo-Pakistani War. She remained in the Indian Ocean until early January 1972 at which time all ships returned to the operating area off the coast of Vietnam. Wichita, however, after a very brief tour on station off Vietnam went to Subic Bay for a much-needed upkeep. She made one more line swing to Yankee Station in February and then headed back to Long Beach, where she arrived on 31 March. Wichita remained in the United States only long enough to allow for the usual month of post-deployment leave and upkeep and to conduct some major repairs at Hunters Point Naval Shipyard.

On 17 July, she again pointed her bow westward and set a course for the Far East. On 4 August, the ship arrived in Subic Bay. During the next six months, Wichita made six replenishment voyages to the waters surrounding Vietnam. She also made frequent stops at Subic Bay to load supplies and conduct repairs as well as liberty calls at Hong Kong and at Sattahip, Thailand. She concluded that deployment when she arrived back in Long Beach on 16 March 1973.

The end of that deployment coincided with the conclusion of American involvement in the Vietnam War. While this ceased Wichita's support of combat operations, it did not disrupt her pattern of deployments to the western Pacific. She settled into a routine alternating between peacetime operations with the 7th Fleet and routine duties along the west coast of the United States. After six months on the west coast, the ship embarked on her fourth tour of duty with the 7th Fleet, her first under peacetime conditions. She provided routine support for the 7th Fleet ships and a fast carrier task force operating in the Indian Ocean. Wichita returned to Long Beach on 26 March 1974, and following post-deployment standdown and a brief period of west coast operations, she entered the Long Beach Naval Shipyard on 28 June for her first regular overhaul, remaining in the shipyard until the following January.

=== 1975–1979 ===
On 24 January 1975, her home port was changed from Long Beach to San Francisco. Four days later, she completed overhaul and got underway for the first time since early in the previous summer. Following trials out of Long Beach, a voyage to Acapulco, Mexico (Cinco de Mayo) (5 May 1975), and refresher training out of San Diego, Wichita finally arrived in her new home port on 4 April. After a month of preparations, the ship departed San Francisco on 6 May, bound for a seven-month deployment to the western Pacific. She arrived in Subic Bay on 24 May and began a tour of duty with the 7th Fleet characterized by a full schedule of underway replenishments and port visits to such places as Hong Kong, Sasebo, and Yokosuka in addition to Subic Bay. Her assignment lasted until 26 November at which time she departed Subic Bay to return home. She made a stop at Pearl Harbor early in December and reentered San Francisco on the 15th.

Wichita spent the entire year of 1976 engaged in normal operations out of San Francisco. She participated in type training and in several operational readiness exercises. By the end of the year, she was preparing for her sixth deployment to the western Pacific. That deployment began on 12 April 1977 after a period of refresher training. After a somewhat extended voyage, she arrived in Subic Bay on 4 May. During this deployment, the ship initially operated from Subic Bay; but, after 26 July, she limited her activities to the East China Sea and the Sea of Japan, operating from the Japanese ports of Sasebo and Yokosuka. Those duties in support of the 7th Fleet continued until 6 November when she departed Yokosuka to return to the United States. She concluded the deployment at Alameda, California, on 21 November.

Following post-deployment standdown, Wichita resumed normal west coast operations. These included the usual type training and operational readiness exercises as well as port visits to American and Canadian ports. She also helped to train naval reservists. While participating in the initial phases of RIMPAC 78, the ship visited Pearl Harbor on 5 and 6 April 1978 to take on stores and to give her crew a brief liberty. She returned to Pearl Harbor later in the month at the conclusion of her RIMPAC duties. Such activities as these occupied her time until 2 November when she entered the Triple A Shipyard at Hunters Point, California, to begin a nine-month overhaul. As of the summer of 1979, she was completing that overhaul.

Completing the complex overhaul, the ship returned to its homeport of Alamedae from Hunters Point Shipyard. During the period of May 1979 to March 1980, the USS Wichita completed refresher training and sea trials after the yard period. The ship won a Battle "E" award.

=== 1980–1990 ===
Ports of call were to Vancouver, BC for their Seafarer Festival, Mazatlán and San Diego. In 1980, the ship completed a WestPac that included ports of calls in Hawaii, Subic Bay, Philippines, Singapore, Diego Garcia, Misera Oman and Pattaya Beach, Thailand. While operating in the Indian Ocean, the ship lost a detached CH-46 helicopter, Sideflare 70, from Detachment 5 from Naval Air Station North Island. Three crewmen were lost at sea in the Gulf of Oman on 16 July 1980. They were LTJG Paul Cappellino, AT3 Philip Zahlout and AMS3 Robert Malvica. The Shellback initiation was cancelled to a later date. The Navy Expeditionary Medal was awarded to the crew during the 109 days in the Indian Ocean.

For the trip to Alameda, one of the shafts spun a stern tube bearing and the shaft had to be locked down. The last port call was to Pattaya Beach and while transiting the Gulf of Thailand, the ship encountered a boat full of Vietnamese refugees being robbed by Thai pirates. The crew rescued the refugees and took them to Pattaya Beach where they were taken to a Refugee Camp. The crew received the Humanitarian Service Medal for their actions. The transit from the Indian Ocean to Alameda was on one shaft so this took almost 30 days. Also on the transit to Alameda, a mural was painted on the aft elevator by one of the Mess Specialists.

On 20 July 1983 The New York Times reported that the Wichita along with seven other vessels in the Carrier Ranger Battle Group left San Diego on Friday 15 July 1983 and were headed for the western Pacific when they were rerouted and ordered to steam for Central America to conduct training and flight operations in areas off the coasts of Nicaragua, El Salvador and Honduras as part of major military exercises planned for that summer. Besides the carrier Ranger, the battle group was composed of the cruiser Horne, the guided missile destroyer Lynde McCormick, the destroyers Fletcher and Fife, the frigate Marvin Shields, the oiler Wichita and the support ship Camden.

While en route to Central America, the Wichita met the Ranger off the coast of San Diego. During "UNREP" the next day, the Ranger collided with the Wichita causing extensive damage to two sets of the Wichitas kingposts, winch control booths and the aft superstructure. Later in the deployment, because of that damage, the Wichita spent 3 weeks in Subic Bay for repairs and was detached from the Ranger Battlegroup which continued on into the Indian Ocean and the Persian Gulf. Shortly after the repairs at Subic Bay, the Wichita became the lead support ship in the search for the KAL-007 Korean airliner that was shot down and spent 45 days at sea, searching off the coast of northern Japan.

The ports of call in the '83 deployment included, Naval Station Panama Canal, Pearl Harbor, Guam, Subic Bay, Singapore, Chin Hae Korea, Pattaya Beach Thailand, Hong Kong, Yokosuka and Nagasaki Japan.

The final Westpac tour of duty commenced in September 1989. Notable item which occurred during this WestPac includes participation of PACEX 89 which had the highest number of ships assembled together since the end of World War II. PacEx had five complete battle groups and a flotilla of Japanese ships aligned in six columns. Ports of call include Hong Kong in October, Philippines (Subic Bay) in November, Pattaya Beach, Thailand and Singapore in December, Diego Garcia in January, a working port of call in Muscat, Oman in February (five times), Ko Phuket, Thailand, and another visit to Subic Bay in February and a final port of call to Pearl Harbor, Hawaii, in March to clear customs and to pick up dependents for a tiger cruise back to the Naval Supply Center in Oakland, California. During the cruise, the Wichita was part of the Enterprise battle group. Wichita was part of the Enterprise's battle group until after the port of call in Muscat, Oman. After that, the Enterprise and the Long Beach proceeded to the East Coast of the US to Norfolk, Virginia. Wichita became the lead ship of the remainder of that WestPac.

During the period between the final WestPac deployment to the decommissioning of the Wichita, the ship completed some short-term deployments to Victoria, British Columbia, Mazatlan, Puerto Vallarta, Mexico, and Portland, Oregon. During the deployment to Mazatlan and Puerto Vallarta, the Wichita hosted a complement of US Coast Guard personnel for drug-smuggling operations. In addition, the ship was in the yards during the end of 1990 and received two CIWS turrets.

[1990-1993]

== Decommissioning ==
Wichita was decommissioned on 12 March 1993 and stricken from the Naval Vessel Register on 15 February 1995. She was transferred to United States Maritime Administration on 18 December 1998 and laid up in the National Defense Reserve Fleet at Suisun Bay, California. During 2013 she was recycled at EMR's International Shipbreaking Ltd. in Brownsville, TX, USA.

== Awards ==
Wichita earned four battle stars for Vietnam service. Wichita earned the Armed Forces Expeditionary Medal for setting a record of replenishing the most ships in a 24-hour period (23 ships).
