= USS Roanoke (AOR-7) =

Oiler of the United States Navy

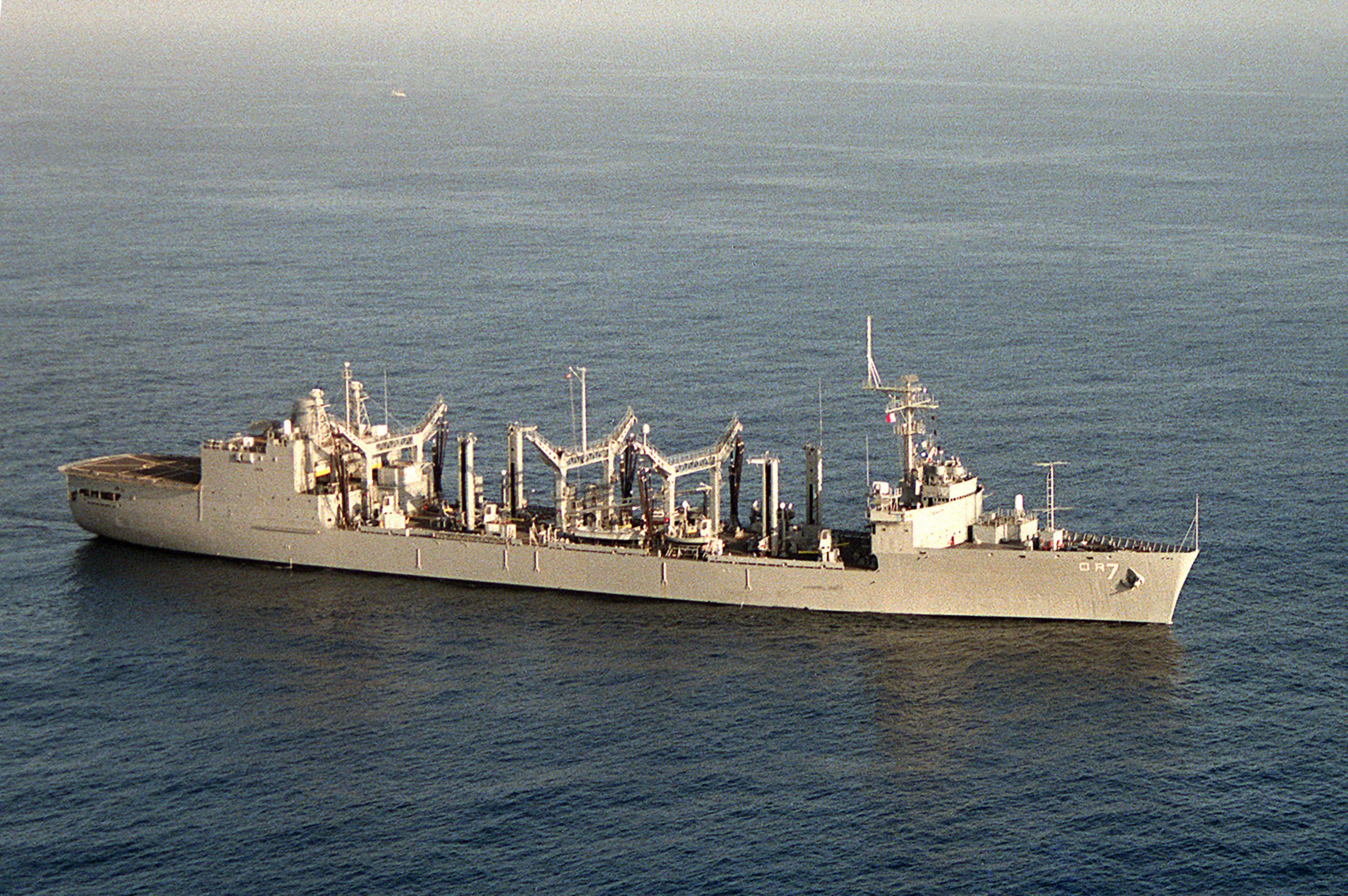
- USS Roanoke (AOR-7) underway off the coast of Guantanamo Bay, Cuba

History

United States
- Name: USS Roanoke
- Namesake: Roanoke River and Roanoke, Virginia
- Builder: National Steel and Shipbuilding Company, San Diego
- Laid down: 19 January 1974
- Launched: 7 December 1974
- Commissioned: 30 October 1976
- Decommissioned: 6 October 1995
- Stricken: 6 October 1995
- Identification: IMO number: 8644163
- Motto: Dedicated to Service
- Fate: Sold for scrapping, 1 October 2012 for $1,926,726

General characteristics
- Class & type: Wichita-class replenishment oiler
- Displacement: 14,048 long tons (14,273 t) light; 39,790 long tons (40,429 t) full
- Length: 659 ft (201 m)
- Beam: 96 ft (29 m)
- Draft: 37 ft (11 m)
- Propulsion: 3 × boilers, 2 × steam turbines, 2 × shafts, 32,000 shp (23,862 kW)
- Speed: 20 knots (37 km/h; 23 mph)
- Complement: 34 officers, 463 enlisted
- Armament: 2 × Phalanx CIWS; 1 × Sea Sparrow missile system (NSSMS)
- Aircraft carried: 2 × CH-46 Sea Knight helicopters

USS Roanoke (AOR-7) was a Wichita-class replenishment oiler of the United States Navy. She was named after the city of Roanoke, Virginia and the Roanoke River, in keeping with the naming convention of her class.

Built by the National Steel and Shipbuilding Company, of San Diego, California, she was launched on 7 December 1974, and commissioned on 30 October 1976.

Roanoke sailed for her first deployment to the western Pacific in January 1978, where she supported various USN units, including the USS Enterprise (CVN-65), USS Long Beach (CGN-9) and USS Truxtun (CGN-35) during the Australian leg of their deployment, docking in Fremantle, Western Australia from 7–10 August 1978. After 10 months away USS Roanoke finally returned to her homeport of San Francisco, California, in October. This set the pattern for the next twelve years, as she was deployed on a voyage to the western Pacific and Indian Ocean, each lasting six to eight months, every year.

Between January 1991 and August 1993 she sailed on two deployments to the Persian Gulf supporting Operation Desert Storm. She made one last deployment to the western Pacific in June to December 1994, before being decommissioned.

Roanoke was decommissioned on 6 October 1995, and struck from the Naval Vessel Register the same day.

Title to the ship was transferred to the United States Maritime Administration on 18 December 1998, and she was laid up in the National Defense Reserve Fleet, at Suisun Bay, California.

== Awards ==
- Joint Meritorious Unit Award
- 2 × Meritorious Unit Commendation
- 2 × Navy Expeditionary Medal (Iran/Indian Ocean)
- National Defense Service Medal
- Armed Forces Expeditionary Medal
- Southwest Asia Service Medal
- Kuwait Liberation Medal (Kuwait)
- Battle Efficiency Award 1984
