= USS Wabash (AOR-5) =

Oiler of the United States Navy

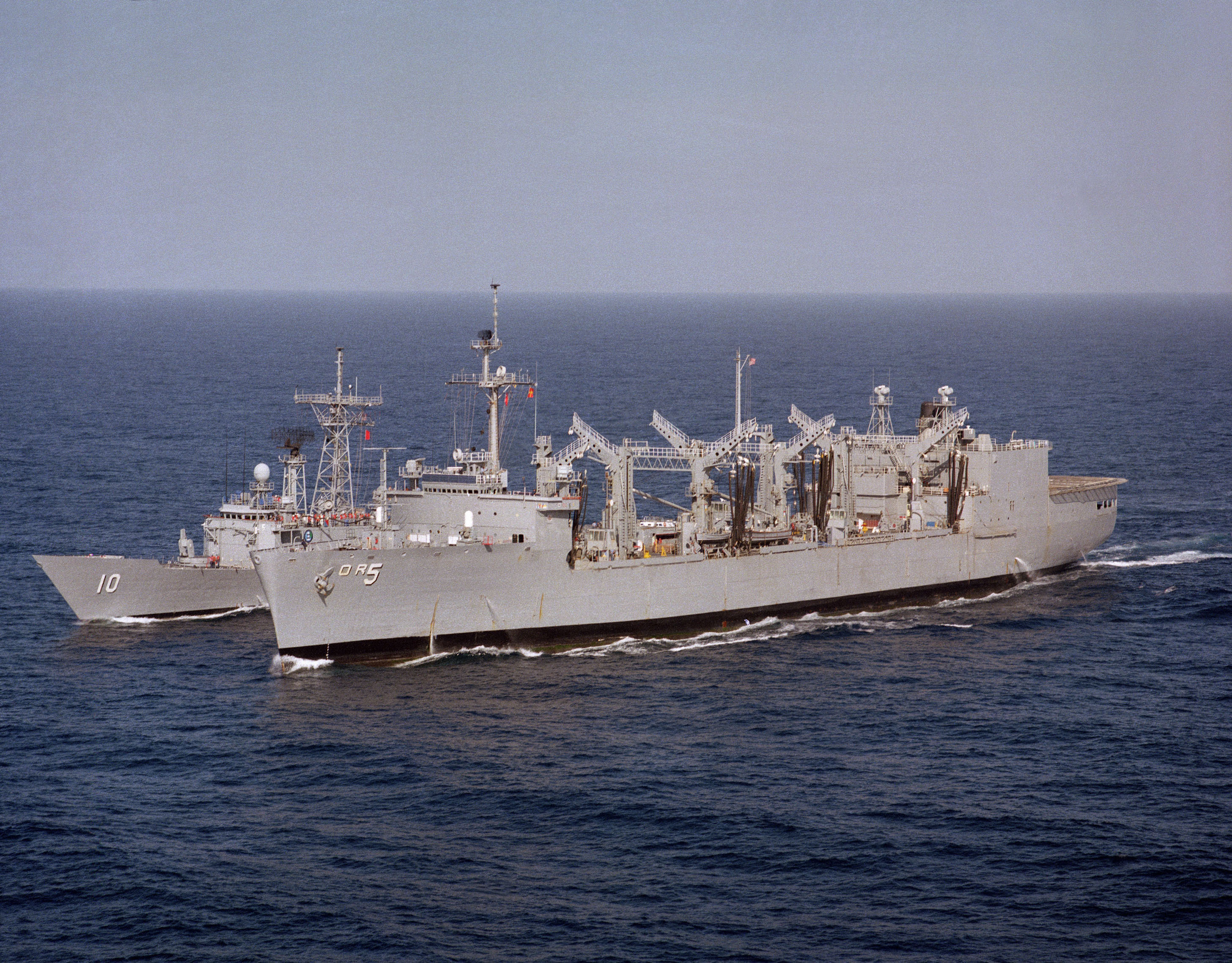
- Wabash refueling USS Duncan, 1984

History

United States
- Name: USS Wabash
- Namesake: Wabash River
- Builder: General Dynamics Quincy Shipbuilding Division, Quincy, Massachusetts
- Laid down: 21 January 1970
- Launched: 6 February 1971
- Commissioned: 20 November 1971
- Decommissioned: 30 September 1994
- Stricken: 8 April 1997
- Identification: IMO number: 8644204
- Nickname(s): "The Wabash Cannonball"
- Fate: Scrapped, 2013

General characteristics
- Class & type: Wichita-class replenishment oiler
- Displacement: 37,360 long tons (37,960 t) full
- Length: 659 ft (201 m)
- Beam: 96 ft (29 m)
- Draft: 36 ft (11 m)
- Speed: 20 knots (37 km/h; 23 mph)
- Complement: 390
- Armament: 4 × 3 in (76 mm) guns, 1 × Sea Sparrow SAM

USS Wabash (AOR-5) was a Wichita-class replenishment oiler in the United States Navy from 1970 to 1994.

Wabash was named for the Wabash River, a river that rises in Darke County, Ohio, near Fort Recovery and meanders westward across Indiana until it reaches Illinois at a point just southwest of Terre Haute, Indiana.

== Service history ==
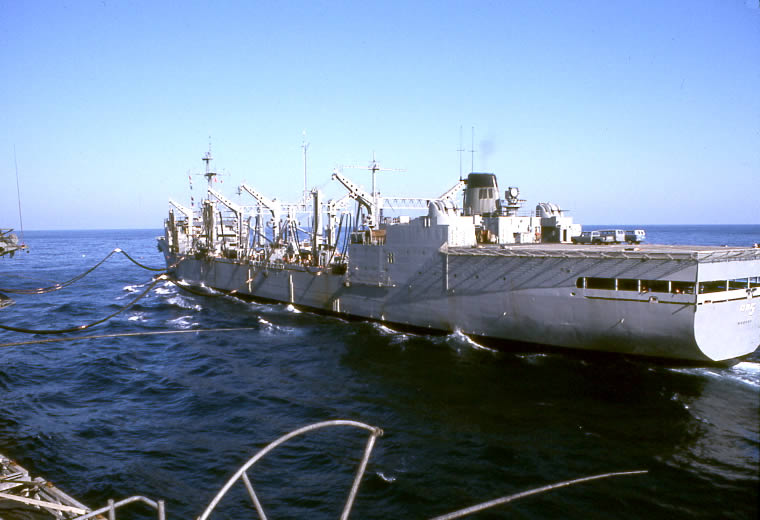
USS Wabash during underway replenishment with USS Midway, 1974

USS Wabash was laid down on 21 January 1970 by General Dynamics Quincy Shipbuilding Division at Quincy, Massachusetts. The ship was launched on 6 February 1971, sponsored by Mrs. William G. Bray. Wabash was commissioned on 20 November 1971 at the Boston Naval Shipyard.

Wabash sailed for the West Coast on 5 January 1972, called at Rio de Janeiro, Brazil; transited the Strait of Magellan; and visited Valparaíso, Chile; Callao, Peru; and Acapulco, Mexico, before arriving at her home port, Long Beach, California, on 3 March. She underwent shakedown from 22 May to 16 June and operated off the coast of southern California into the autumn.

=== Vietnam Support operations ===
The replenishment oiler commenced her first western Pacific (WestPac) deployment when she departed Long Beach on 9 November. After proceeding via Pearl Harbor, Hawaii, she arrived at Subic Bay, Philippine Islands, on 1 December and, assigned to Service Squadron 9, assumed duties as flagship for Commander, Task Group (TG) 73.5.

That group sortied for Tonkin Gulf on 7 December. Wabash conducted 46 underway replenishments during her first tour on the "line" off the coast of Vietnam and celebrated Christmas at sea while returning to the Philippines. Arriving in Subic Bay on 28 December, Wabash soon headed back toward the line on 2 January 1973. She conducted two or three replenishments a day during the final phase of American combat operations in Vietnam.

In February, United States forces were withdrawn from combat. However, she made two more line deployments during her WestPac deployment, for—while combat operations had ceased—the job of supplying the ships of the Fleet still remained. On 21 May, Wabash departed Yokosuka, Japan, bound, via Pearl Harbor, for Long Beach.

=== Second WestPac deployment ===
The ship engaged in training exercises and underwent inspections into the summer. On 6 September 1973, her home port was changed to Alameda, California. The oiler conducted local operations out of Alameda through the end of the year and departed the west coast on 2 March 1974 for her second WestPac deployment. This lasted through the summer, with operations in Philippine and Japanese waters, before the ship departed Subic Bay on 25 September to return to the United States.

During this period of Alameda-based fleet support operations, Wabash participated in the multinational maneuvers "FleetEx 1-76." This operation, conducted off the southern California coast, lasted from 1 to 13 March 1976, and included units of the United States, United Kingdom, Canada, and New Zealand navies.

=== Additional WestPac deployment ===
On 5 June 1976, Wabash again set sail for WestPac. En route, she collided with Flint during a towing exercise, but neither ship suffered damage curtailing her primary mission capabilities. No one was injured. After damage and voyage repairs at Subic Bay, Wabash commenced routine local operations in Philippine waters. On 9 July, however, she returned hurriedly to Subic Bay to load stores and cargo and departed the following day to conduct a "stern chase" of task group TG 77.7. This group was then headed for the Indian Ocean and a 30-day "show the flag" cruise. En route, Wabash rendezvoused with Mars to load further supplies and stores, transited the Strait of Malacca, and entered the Indian Ocean on 17 July.

Wabash conducted underway replenishments with Ranger, Preble, Goldsborough, and Ouellet, as task force TF 77 "showed the flag" in the Indian Ocean as part of the American effort to balance a growing Soviet presence in that area of the world. Her duties thus completed, Wabash returned to Subic Bay on 7 August and got underway nine days later to rejoin the Ranger task group to replenish them as they returned to the United States.

Completing her duties with the Ranger group soon thereafter, Wabash put into Guam, Mariana Islands, and prepared to provision the incoming Enterprise task group. The replenishment ship subsequently conducted local operations in the Philippines in September and in Japanese waters in October—operating out of Sasebo—before visiting Pusan, Korea. Returning to Sasebo on 25 October, the ship headed for Yokosuka soon thereafter for repairs and upkeep prior to concluding her WestPac deployment. During this, her third WestPac tour, Wabash had steamed over 35,000 miles, conducted 100 underway replenishments, and had been at sea nearly 65 percent of the time. Departing Japanese waters on 10 November, Wabash arrived at her home port one day before Thanksgiving.

=== Exercise RIMPAC 77 ===
Completing the year 1976 in port at Alameda, Wabash spent the latter half of January 1977 undergoing a restricted availability at Alameda. During the period 17 February to 1 March, the ship engaged in Exercise "RIMPAC 77", a major fleet exercise involving ships from the United States, Australian, New Zealand, and Canadian navies. Wabash conducted 28 underway replenishments during this time. Refresher training continued throughout the spring until the replenishment ship entered Todd Shipyard, Alameda, on 15 June for the commencement of a regular overhaul. With the overhaul completed on 9 June 1978, Wabash devoted the remainder of the year to shakedown and refresher training. January 1979 found Wabash in her home port of Alameda preparing to meet scheduled commitments for that year.

[1979-1994]

In 1983 / 1984 Wabash was reassigned to a new home-port from Alameda to Long Beach, California.

=== Decommissioning ===
Wabash was decommissioned on 30 September 1994 and stricken from the Naval Vessel Register on 8 April 1997. She was laid up in the National Defense Reserve Fleet at Suisun Bay, California.
