= RIM-7 Sea Sparrow =

US ship-borne short-range air defense missile system

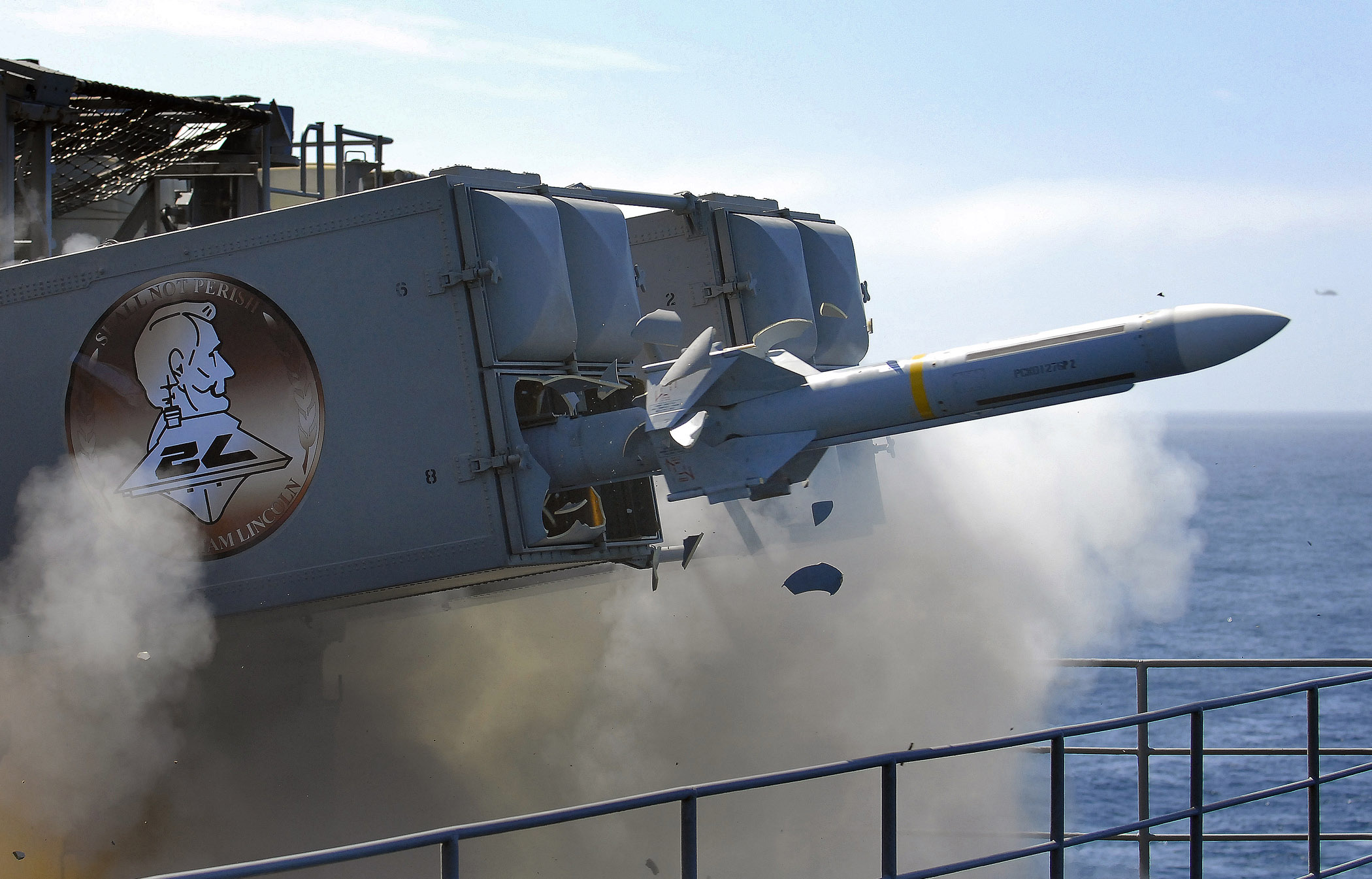
- A Sea Sparrow launched from the USS Abraham Lincoln (CVN-72)
- Type: Surface-to-air missile
- Place of origin: United States

Service history
- In service: 1976–present

Production history
- Manufacturer: Raytheon and General Dynamics
- Unit cost: $165,400

Specifications
- Mass: 510 lb (230 kg)
- Length: 12 ft (3.7 m)
- Diameter: 8 in (20 cm)
- Wingspan: 3 ft 4 in (1.02 m)
- Warhead: Annular blast fragmentation warhead, 90 lb (41 kg)
- Detonation mechanism: Proximity fuzed, expanding rod, with a 27 ft (8.2 m) kill radius
- Engine: Hercules MK-58 solid-propellant rocket motor
- Operational range: 10 nmi (19 km)
- Maximum speed: 4,256 km/h (2,645 mph)
- Guidance system: Semi-active radar homing
- Launch platform: Ship, Buk-M1 (modified for use in Ukraine)

The RIM-7 Sea Sparrow is a U.S. ship-borne short-range anti-aircraft and anti-missile weapon system, primarily intended for defense against anti-ship missiles. The system was developed in the early 1960s from the AIM-7 Sparrow air-to-air missile as a lightweight "point-defense" weapon that could be retrofitted to existing ships as quickly as possible, often in place of existing gun-based anti-aircraft weapons. In this incarnation, it was a very simple system guided by a manually aimed radar illuminator.

After its introduction, the system underwent significant development into an automated system similar to other US Navy missiles like the RIM-2 Terrier. Contemporary improvements being made to the Sparrow for the air-to-air role led to similar improvements in the Sea Sparrow through the 1970s and 1980s. After that point the air-to-air role passed to the AIM-120 AMRAAM and the Sea Sparrow underwent a series of upgrades strictly for the naval role. It now resembles the AIM-7 only in general form; it is larger, faster and includes a new seeker and a launch system suitable for vertical launch from modern warships.

Fifty years after its development, the Sea Sparrow remains an important part of a layered air defense system, providing a short/medium-range component especially useful against sea-skimming missiles.

== History ==
=== Background ===
High-speed jet aircraft flying at low altitudes presented a serious threat to naval forces in the late 1950s. Approaching under the local horizon of the ships, the aircraft would suddenly appear at relatively close ranges, giving the ships only seconds to respond before the aircraft dropped their payloads and withdrew. This gave the aircraft an enormous advantage over earlier weapons such as dive bombers or torpedo bombers, whose low speed allowed them to be attacked with some effectiveness by anti-aircraft guns. The advantage was so great that when the Royal Navy was faced by the threat of the new Soviet Sverdlov-class cruiser, they responded in a non-linear fashion by introducing the Blackburn Buccaneer aircraft to attack them.

Further improving the capabilities of aircraft against ships were a variety of precision-guided weapons. Early designs were first used in World War II with manually controlled weapons such as the Fritz X, and evolving into semi-autonomous cruise missiles, such as the Raduga KS-1 Komet, that relied on a combination of initial guidance from the launching aircraft and terminal guidance on the missile itself. These systems allowed the aircraft to launch their attacks from outside the range of shipboard anti-aircraft weapons, in relative safety. Only the presence of defensive fighters operating at long ranges from the ships could provide cover against these attacks, by attacking the launch aircraft before they could close on the ships.

US Navy doctrine stressed long-range air cover to counter both high-speed aircraft and missiles, and development of newer short range defenses had been largely ignored. While the Navy was developing expensive long-range fighters like the Douglas F6D Missileer, most ships were left with older weapons, typically Bofors 40 mm guns or Oerlikon 20 mm cannons. By the early 1960s their capability against modern aircraft and missiles was limited; a lack of fast-reacting mounts, gunsight radars of limited accuracy, and long settling times for the fire control systems all meant that the guns were unlikely to be able to respond effectively against high-speed aircraft.

The introduction of sea-skimming missiles dramatically increased the threat against these ships. Unlike the earlier generation of anti-ship missiles (ASMs), sea-skimmers approached at low level, like an attack aircraft, hiding themselves until the last moment. The missiles were relatively small and much harder to hit than an attacking aircraft. While the older defenses might be considered a credible threat to a large aircraft at low altitude or a missile approaching at higher altitudes like the KS-1, against a sea-skimming missile they were useless. To successfully counter this threat, ships needed new weapons able to attack these targets as soon as they appeared, accurately enough to give them a high first-attempt kill probability - there would be little time for a second attempt.

=== Point defense missile system (PDMS) ===
The US Army faced a similar problem defending against attacks by high-speed jet-powered attack aircraft. In this case the local horizon was generally even more limited, blocked by trees and hills, and engagement times could be measured in seconds. They concluded that a gun-based system was simply unusable in this role; by the time the radar had locked-on and the gunsight calculated proper "lead" there would be no time to shoot at the target while it was within a gun's relatively short range. Missiles, on the other hand, could progressively tune their approach while they were flying toward the target, and their proximity fuses meant they only needed to get "close enough".

In 1959 the Army started development of the MIM-46 Mauler, which mounted a new high-speed missile on top of the ubiquitous M113 Armored Personnel Carrier chassis, along with a medium-range search radar and a separate tracking and illumination radar. In order to deal with the quick response times needed, the fire control system was semi-automatic; operators would view targets on the search radar and prioritize them, the fire control system would select ones within attack range and automatically slew the missiles toward them and launch. Since the missile would be operating close to the ground in highly cluttered environments, it used a combination of beam riding along the illumination radar and an infrared seeker in the nose, which allowed tracking as long as either the path in front or in rear of the missile remained free of obstructions.

These same basic engagement parameters - high-speed and the associated fleeting sighting times - applied to sea-skimming aircraft and missiles as well. The Navy intended to adapt the Mauler to shipboard use by removing its search radar and wiring it into the existing ship-borne radar systems instead. The 9-box launcher and illuminator radar would be retained in a relatively compact mount. Development started in 1960 under the "Point Defense Missile System" (PDMS), the naval version to be known as the "RIM-46A Sea Mauler". The Navy was so confident in the Sea Mauler that they modified the design of their latest frigates, the Knox class, to incorporate a space on the rear deck for the Sea Mauler launcher.

The Navy's confidence in Mauler proved misplaced. Due to continued problems the program was downgraded to a pure technology development effort in 1963, and was canceled outright in 1965. All three of the stakeholders, the US Army, US Navy and British Army, started looking for a replacement. While the British took a longer-term approach and developed the new Rapier missile, the US Army and Navy scrambled to find a system that could be deployed as quickly as possible. Facing the problem of guidance in a cluttered environment, the Army decided to adapt the infrared AIM-9 Sidewinder missile into the MIM-72 Chaparral. This was based on the AIM-9D, which could only acquire targets from the rear, and would be useless for the Navy where its targets would be approaching head on. They required a radar-guided system, and this naturally led to the AIM-7 Sparrow. They also considered Chaparral for smaller ships due to its much smaller size, but no such fits were ever attempted.

=== Basic point defense missile system (BPDMS) ===
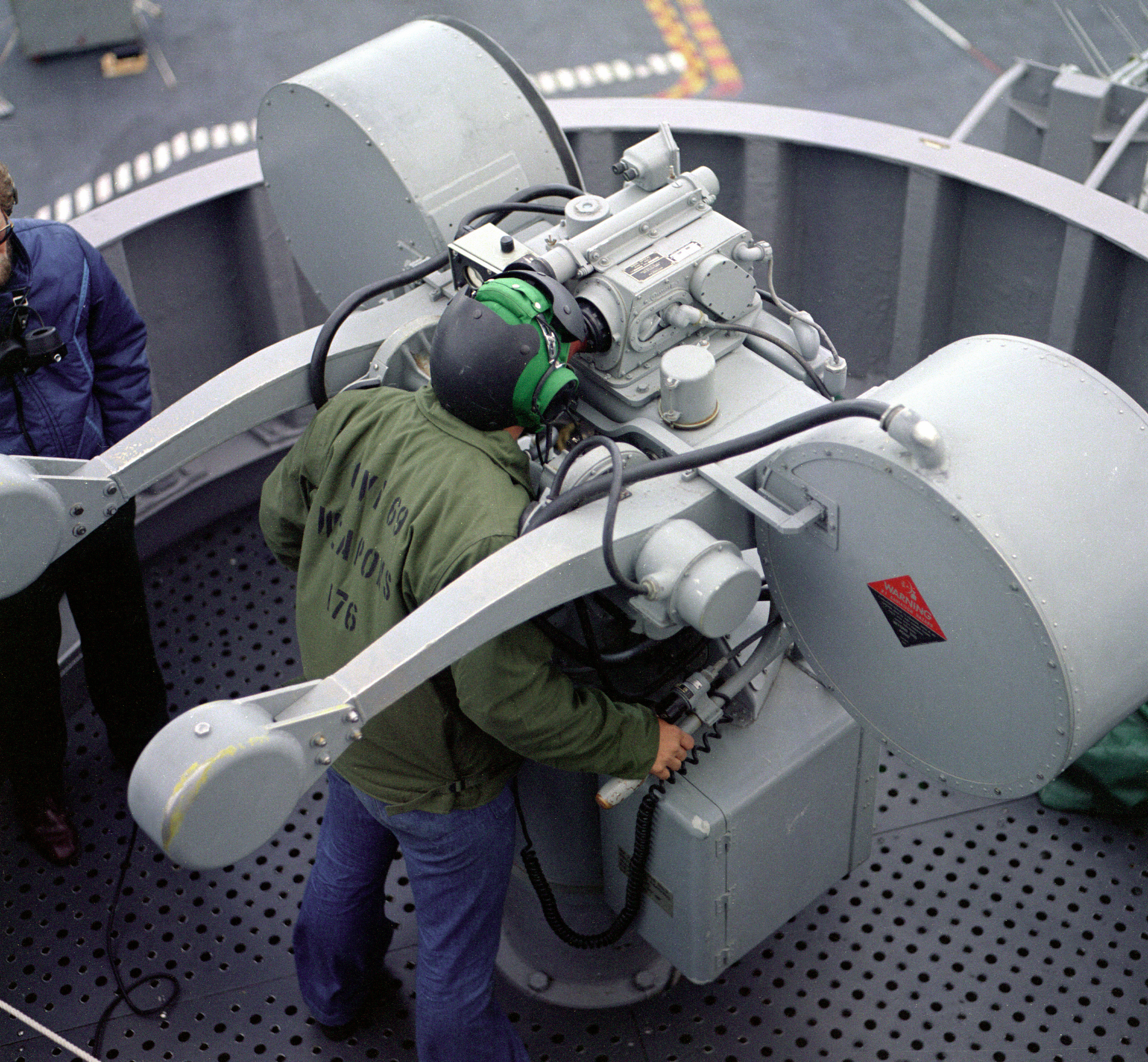
Mark 115 manned director, initially used to guide a Sea Sparrow to its target as a part of BPDMS.

Quickly organizing the "Basic Point Defense Missile System", BPDMS, the then-current AIM-7E from the F-4 Phantom was adapted to shipboard use as RIM-7E with surprising speed. The main developments were the new Mark 25 missile launcher developed from the Mark 16 ASROC launcher, and the Mark 115 manually aimed radar illuminator that looked like two large searchlights. Operation was extremely simple; the operator would be cued to targets via voice commands from the search radar operators, and rotated the illuminator onto that angle. The relatively wide beam of the radar only needed to be in the general direction of the target, the continuous wave signal being Doppler shifted by the moving target and showing up strongly even if it was not centered in the beam. The launcher would automatically follow the motions of the illuminator, so that when the missile was fired it would immediately see the signal being reflected off the target.

In this form the Sea Sparrow was tested on the destroyer escort USS Bradley starting in February 1967, but this installation was removed when Bradley was sent to Vietnam later that year. Testing continued, and between 1971 and 1975 Sea Sparrow was fitted to 31 ships of the Knox-class frigate, hulls 1052 to 1069 and 1071 to 1083. The "missing ship" in the series, Downes (DE-1070), was instead used to test an upgraded version (see below).

The Sea Sparrow was far from an ideal weapon. Its rocket engine was designed with the assumption that it would be launched at high speed from an aircraft, and therefore is optimized for a long cruise at relatively low power. In the surface-to-air role one would rather have very high acceleration in order to allow it to intercept sea-skimming targets as soon as possible. The power profile is also suitable for cruising in thin air at high altitudes, but at low altitudes it does not produce enough power to overcome drag and dramatically decreases range; some estimates indicate that the Sea Sparrow may be effective only to 10 kilometres (6.2 mi), about one quarter of the range of the air-launched Sparrow. An engine of much higher power would greatly improve performance, in spite of a shorter burning time.

Another problem is that the Sparrow is steered with its mid-mounted maneuvering wings. These were used on the Sparrow because they required less energy for basic maneuvers during cruise, but this made the missile less maneuverable overall, which was not well suited to the quick-reaction weapon. Additionally, the powered wings meant that they could not easily be adapted to fold, and therefore the launcher cells were sized to the wings instead of the missile body, taking up much more room than required. Although the Sea Sparrow was meant as a small missile system that could be fit to a wide variety of ships, the launcher was relatively large and was deployed only to larger frigates, destroyers and aircraft carriers. Finally, the manually aimed illuminator was of limited use at night or in bad weather, which was hardly encouraging for a ship-borne weapon where fog was a common occurrence.

=== Improved basic point defense missile system (IBPDMS) ===
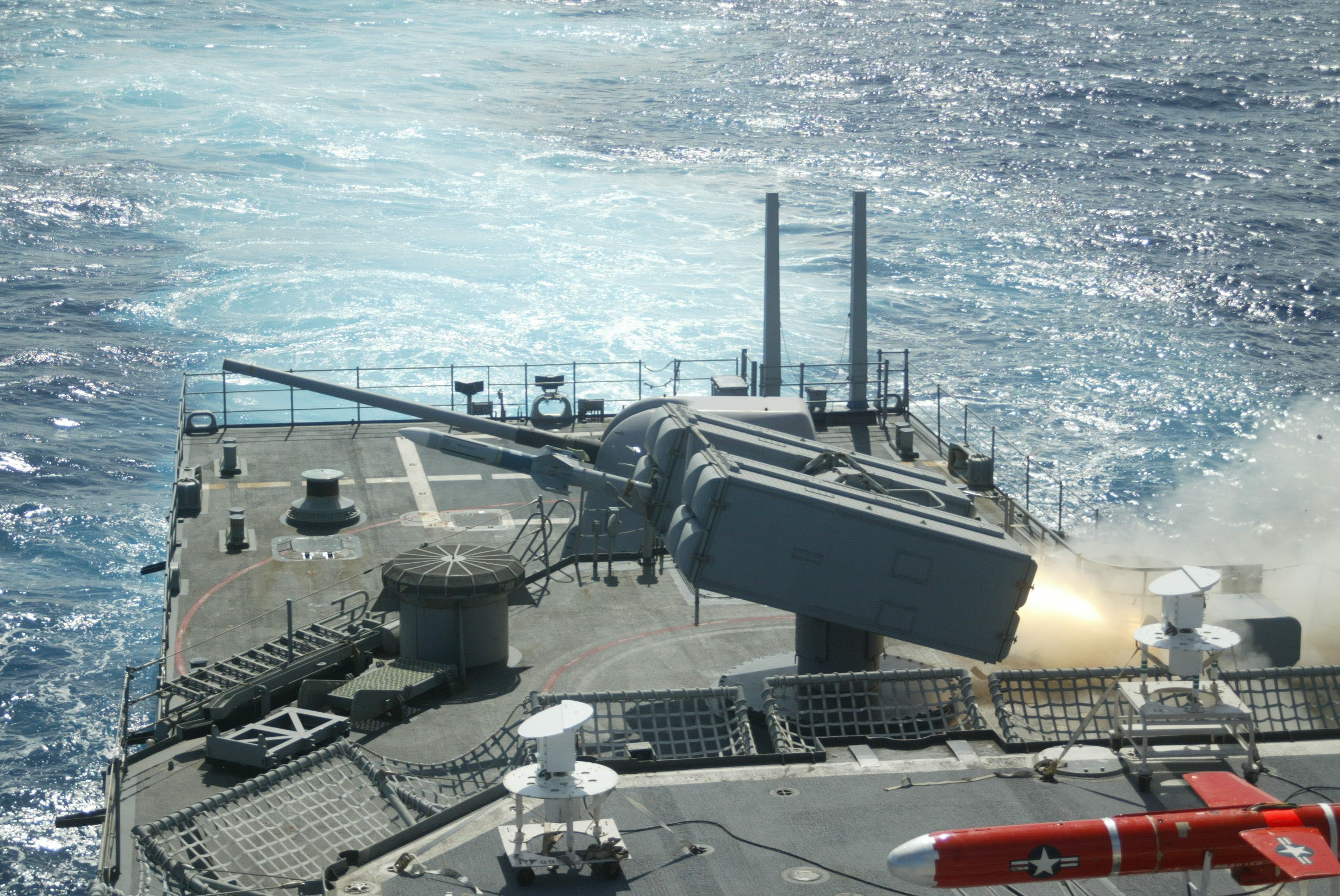
USS O'Brien launches a Sea Sparrow missile, shown with its mid-wing still folded as it departs a NSSM Mark 29 launcher on November 5, 2003.

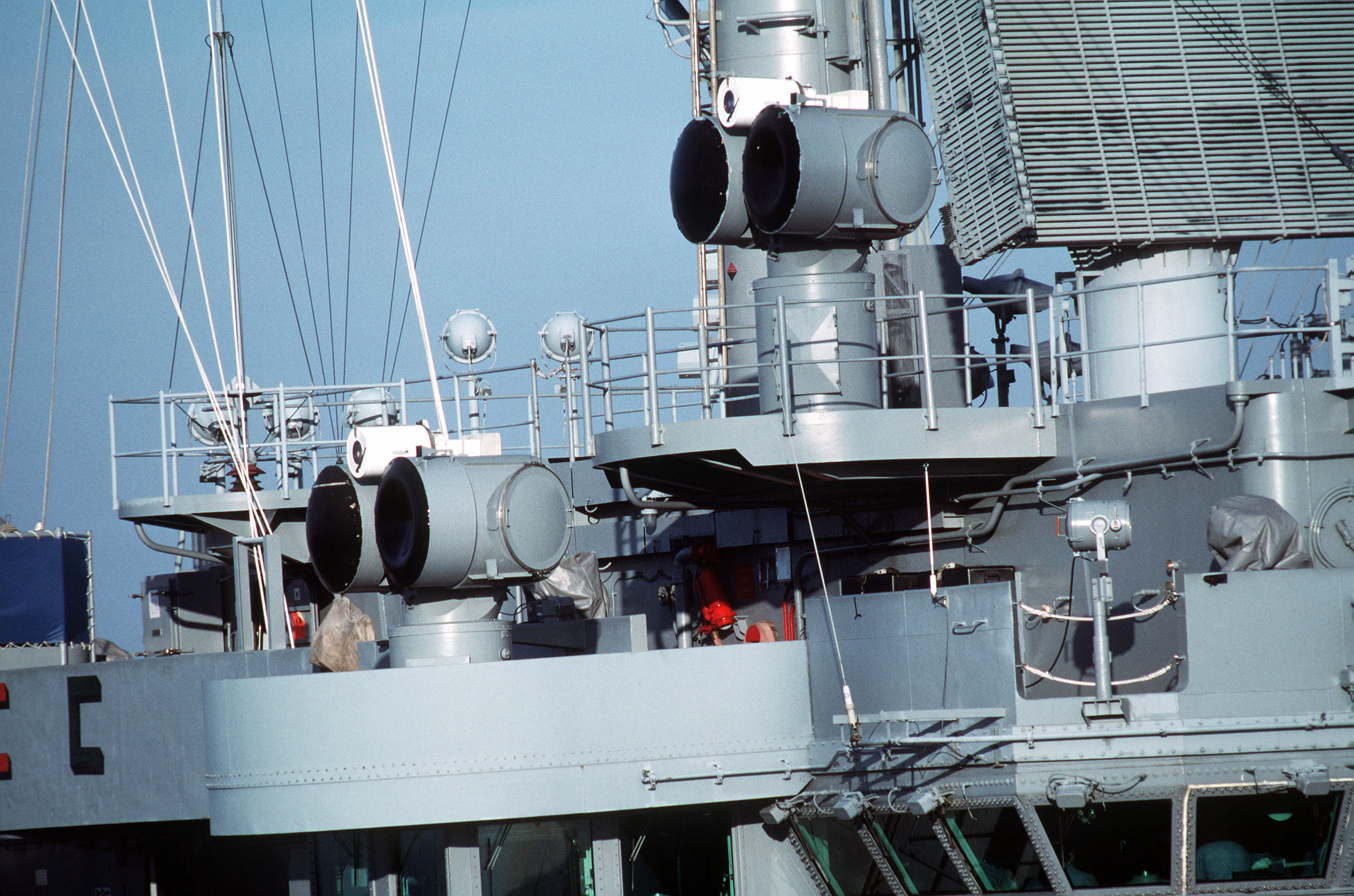
Two Mark 95 unmanned illumination radars used to guide a Sea Sparrow to its target.

In 1968, Denmark, Italy, and Norway signed an agreement with the US Navy to use the Sea Sparrow on their ships, and collaborate on improved versions. Over the next few years a number of other countries joined the NATO SEASPARROW Project Office (NSPO), and today it includes 12 member nations. Under this umbrella group, the "Improved Basic Point Defense Missile System" (IBPDMS) program started even while the original version was being deployed.

IBPDMS emerged as the RIM-7H, which was essentially the RIM-7E with the mid-mounted wings modified to be able to fold. This was done in a fashion similar to carrier-based aircraft; the wings were hinged at a point about 50% along the span, with the outer portions rotated back toward the body of the missile. This allowed them to be stored in tighter container tubes in the new Mark 29 missile launcher, and flip open automatically when they were released from the tube. The other major change was to allow the seeker to work with a variety of illumination radars, including those being used with existing European missile systems.

Production of the RIM-7H began in 1973 as NATO Sea Sparrow Missile System (NSSMS) Block I. For the US Navy's use the new Mark 95 illuminator system was also introduced, similar to the original Mark 115 but with automatic guidance that could be used in any weather. The Mark 95 formed the basis of the highly automated Mark 91 fire control system.

=== Missile upgrades ===
In 1972 Raytheon started a Sparrow upgrade program to arm the upcoming F-15 Eagle, producing the AIM-7F. The F model replaced the older analog guidance system with a solid state version that could operate with the F-15's new pulse-doppler radar. The guidance system was much smaller, which allowed the warhead to be moved from its former rear-mounted position to one in front of the mid-mounted wings, and increased in weight to 86 lb (39 kg). Moving it forward also allowed the rocket engine to be enlarged, so it was replaced by a new dual-thrust engine that quickly accelerated the missile to higher speeds, and then settled to a lower thrust for cruise. The new missiles were quickly adapted for the naval role in a fashion similar to the RIM-7H, producing the RIM-7F. The new missile used the lower model designation in spite of the newer technology than the H model.

Another major upgrade to the AIM-7 followed, the AIM-7M. The M included a new monopulse radar seeker that allowed it to be shot downward from a higher-altitude aircraft at a target otherwise masked by the ground. The new model also included a completely computerized guidance system that could be updated in the field, as well as further reducing weight for yet another warhead upgrade. The computerized guidance system also included a simple autopilot that allowed the missile to continue flying toward the last known target location even with the loss of a signal, allowing the launch platform to break lock for short periods while the missile was in flight. All of these modifications also improved performance against low-altitude sea-skimming targets as well. The M model entered US operational service in 1983.

The original RIM-7E was capable to fly at about Mach 2+, between 30 and 15,000 metres (98 and 49,213 ft), with a range of 15–22 kilometres (8.1–11.9 nmi) (depending on the target height). The RIM-7F enhanced the performances, but also the proximity fuse versus low flying targets, as the minimum altitude was reduced to 15 metres (49 ft) or less. The RIM-7M was able to strike targets at an altitude of 8 metres (26 ft), providing some capability against sea-skimming missiles such the Exocet.

While the M model was being worked on, the US Navy also introduced an upgrade for the Mark 91 fire control system, the "Mark 23 Target Acquisition System" (TAS). TAS included a medium-range 2D radar and IFF system that fed information to a new console in the ship's combat information center. The Mark 23 automatically detected, prioritized and displayed potential targets, greatly improving reaction times of the system as a whole. The Mark 23 is also used to select targets for most other weapons systems, including gunfire and other missile systems. TAS started entering the fleet in 1980.

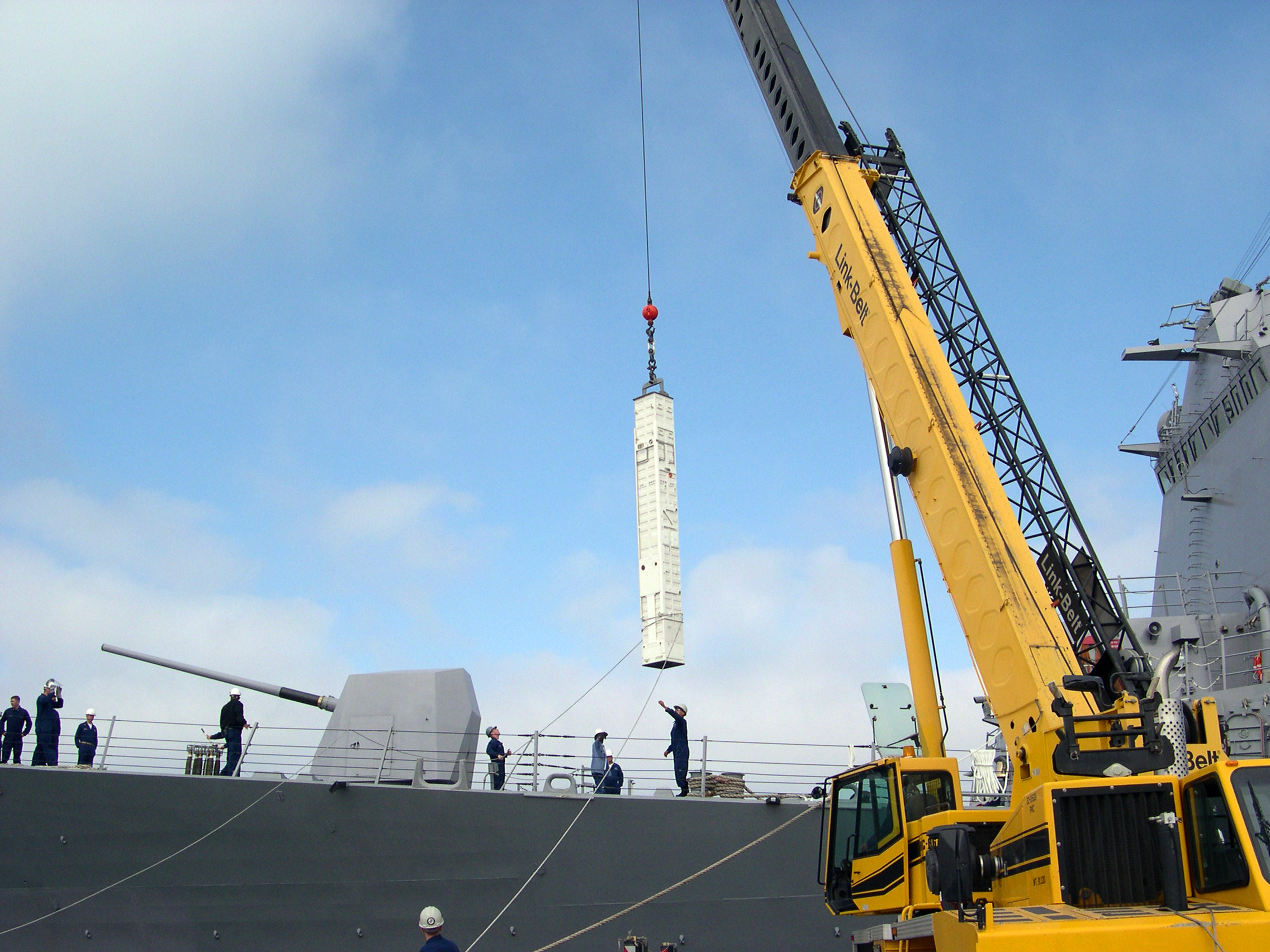
Evolved Sea Sparrow being lowered into VLS tube

The NSPO also used the M series upgrade as an opportunity to upgrade the system to allow it to be launched from a Vertical Launching System (VLS). This modification uses the "Jet Vane Control" (JVC) package that is added to the bottom of the missile. On launch, a small engine in the JVC boosts the missile up above the launching ship, then uses vanes positioned in its own exhaust to quickly slew the missile into the proper alignment with the target, which is fed to the JVC during launch. As far as the Sea Sparrow is concerned, there is no difference between being launched directly from a trainable launcher or using JVC, in both cases the missile becomes active looking directly at the target.

A final upgrade to the Sparrow was the AIM-7P, which replaced the M's guidance system with an improved model that allowed mid-course updates to be sent from the launching platform via new rear-mounted antennas. For air-to-air use this allowed the missile to be "lofted" above the target and then be directed down towards it as it approached; this gives the missile greater range as it spends more time in thinner high-altitude air. In naval use, this meant it could also be directly guided against small surface targets that would otherwise not show up well on radar, allowing the ship's more powerful search radars to provide guidance until the missile approached the target and the reflected signal grew stronger. This also gave the Sea Sparrow a very useful secondary anti-shipping role that allows it to attack smaller boats.

=== Ground-launched Sea Sparrow ===
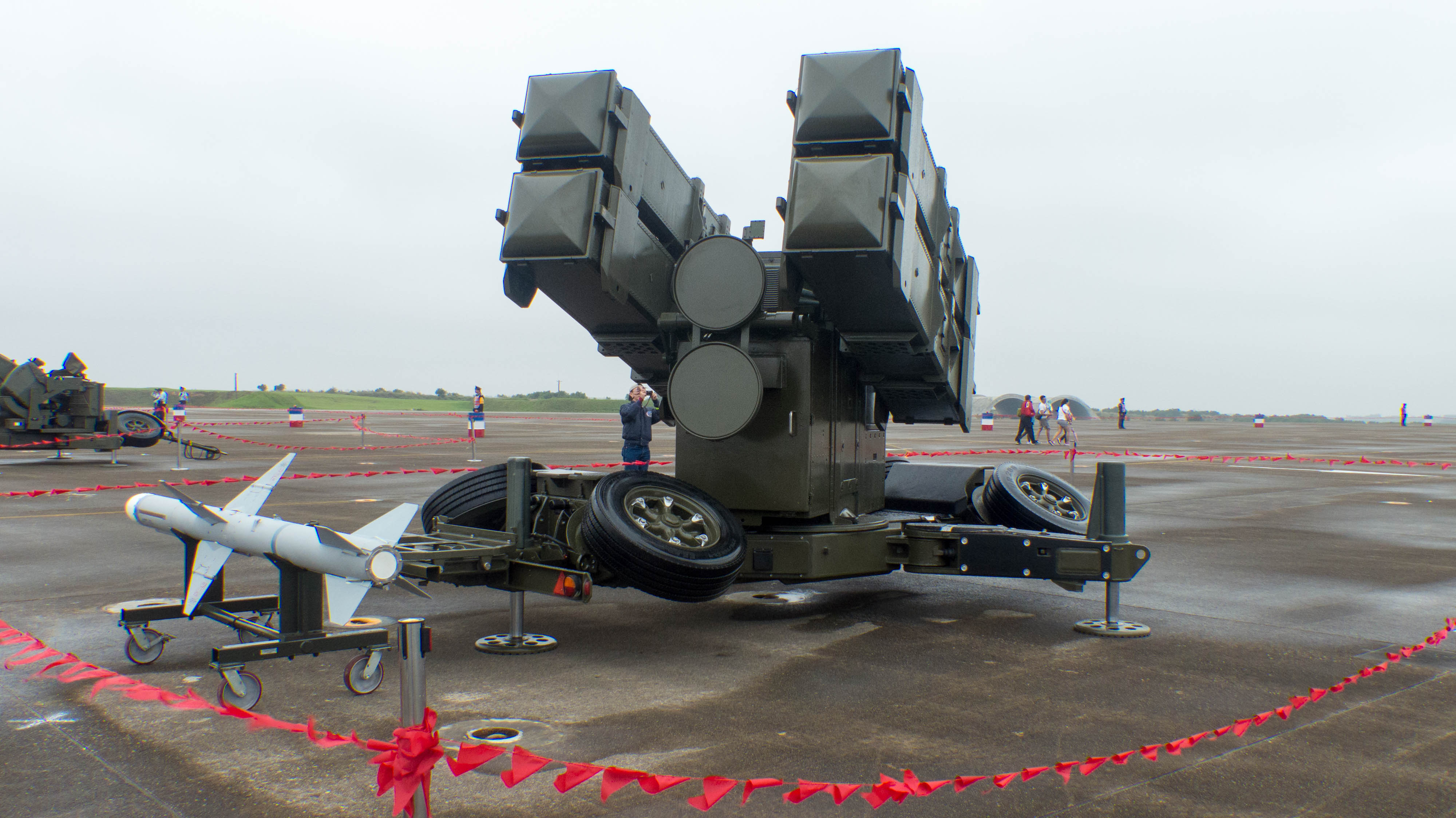
RIM-7 SAM missile launcher display at Ching Chuan Kang Air Base, Taiwan.

Taiwan operates ground based Sea Sparrows as part of the Skyguard SHORAD system. Five hundred missiles entered service in 1991 and are deployed on trailers with four box launchers. In 2012 they were temporarily withdrawn from service following a pair of missile failures during testing as well as the failure of a related AIM-7 in the same exercises.

In January 2023, the United States announced it would transfer Sea Sparrow missiles to Ukraine as part of a military aid package during the 2022 Russian invasion of Ukraine. The Sea Sparrows are fired from Soviet-era 9K37 Buk missile launchers modified by Ukraine to accept them, to counter attacks from cruise missiles and drones. The system, dubbed "FrankenSAM", utilizes three different air defense missiles—RIM-7 Sea Sparrow missiles, AIM-9 Sidewinder missiles, plus Patriot missiles and Patriot sensor elements—in combination air defense systems based on older Ukrainian tracked vehicles and the Buk missile system. FrankenSAM was confirmed to be in use in December 2023, and was first used successfully in combat to bring down a Russian Shahed drone on 17 January 2024 from 9 km distance.

=== Evolved Sea Sparrow missile (ESSM) ===
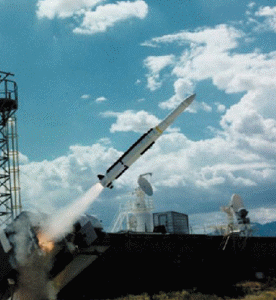
An ESSM launching. Note the enlarged engine section.

Although the Navy and Air Force initially planned additional upgrades for the Sparrow, notably the AIM-7R with a combination radar/infrared seeker, these were canceled in favor of the much more advanced AIM-120 AMRAAM in December 1996. With the link between the airborne and shipborne versions of the Sparrow severed, Raytheon proposed a much more extensive set of upgrades to the Sea Sparrow, the RIM-7R Evolved Sea Sparrow Missile (ESSM). The changes were so extensive that the project was renamed, becoming the RIM-162 ESSM.

The ESSM takes the existing guidance section from the RIM-7P and fits it to an entirely new rear-section. The new missile is 10 inches (25 cm) in diameter instead of the previous 8 inches, which allows for a much more powerful motor. It also eliminates the mid-mounted wings entirely, replacing them with long fins similar to those on the Standard missile (and practically every other Navy missile since the 1950s) and moves guidance control to the rear fins. The tail-fin based steering of the ESSM uses up more energy but offers considerably higher maneuverability while the engine is still firing.

The Mark 25 quad-missile pack was developed during the 1990s to fit four ESSMs into a single Mk 41 VLS cell. For VLS use, ESSMs are fitted with the same JVC system as the earlier versions.

== Operators ==
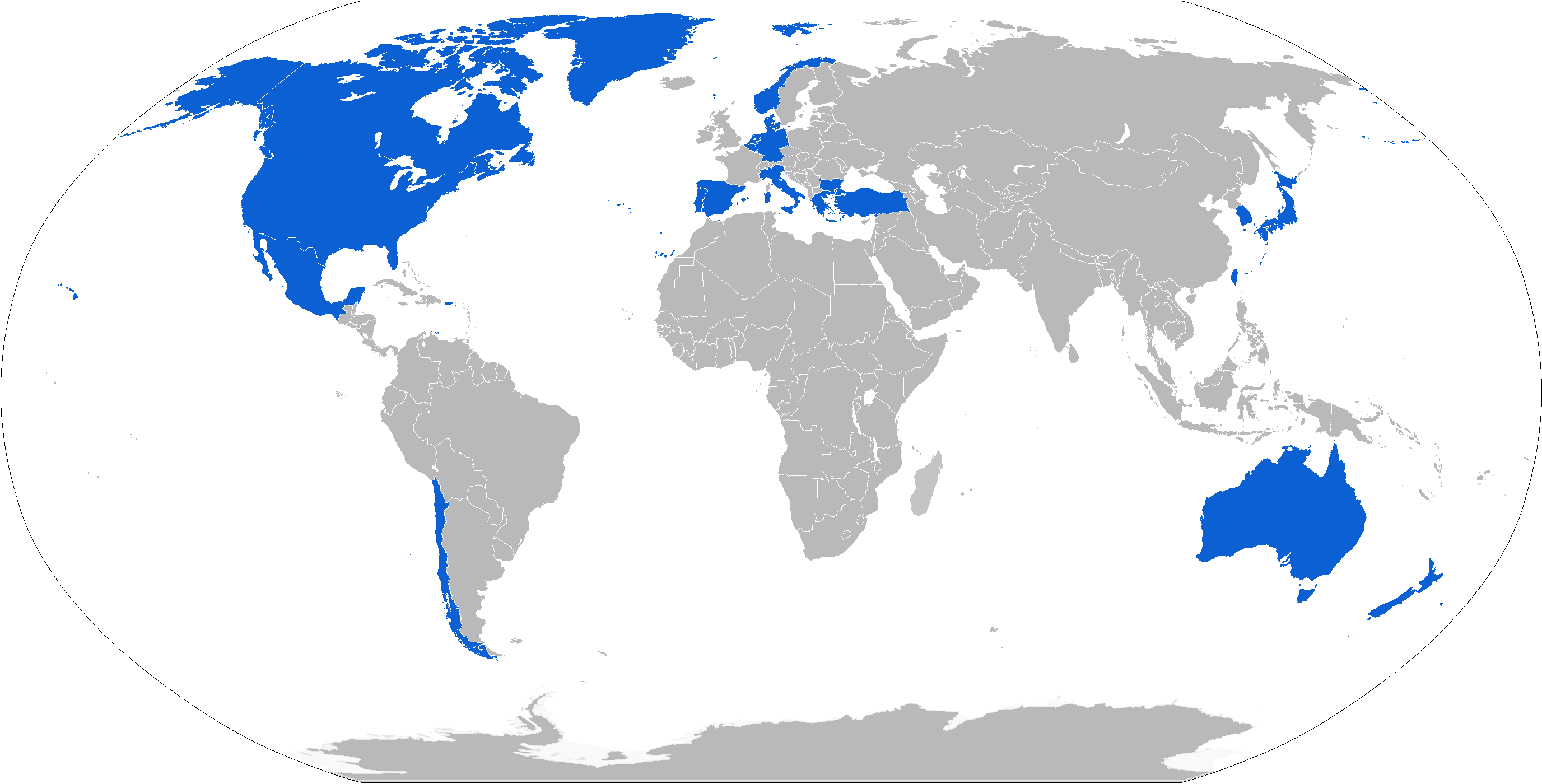
Map with RIM-7 operators in blue

=== Current operators ===
Belgium

- Belgian Navy

Bulgaria

- Bulgarian Navy

Canada

- Royal Canadian Navy

Chile

- Chilean Navy

Denmark

- Royal Danish Navy

Germany

- German Navy

Greece

- Hellenic Air Force
- Hellenic Navy

Italy

- Italian Navy

Japan

- Japan Maritime Self-Defense Force

South Korea

- Republic of Korea Navy

Mexico

- Mexican Navy

Netherlands

- Royal Netherlands Navy

Norway

- Royal Norwegian Navy

Portugal

- Portuguese Navy

Spain

- Spanish Navy

Turkey

- Turkish Naval Forces

Ukraine

- Armed Forces of Ukraine: Unknown number to be delivered by the United States in 2023. Sea Sparrows will be mounted on the self-propelled Buk missile system.

United States

- United States Navy

Republic of China

- Republic of China Air Force

=== Former operators ===
Australia

- Royal Australian Navy

New Zealand

- Royal New Zealand Navy

== See also ==
- 1963 United States Tri-Service rocket and guided missile designation system
- List of missiles

=== Related Development ===
- AIM-7 Sparrow
- RIM-162 Evolved SeaSparrow Missile (ESSM)
