= List of ship launches in 1973 =

The list of ship launches in 1973 includes a chronological list of ships launched in 1973. In cases where no official launching ceremony was held, the date built or completed may be used instead.

Date	Ship	Class and type	Builder	Location	Country	Notes
11 January	Svealand	Ferry	A/S Nakskov Skibsværf	Nakskov	Denmark	For Lion Ferry AB.
13 January	Parche	Sturgeon-class submarine	Ingalls Shipbuilding	Pascagoula, Mississippi	United States	For United States Navy.
16 January	U20	Type 206 submarine	Nordseewerke	Emden	West Germany	For German Navy.
18 January	Ambuscade	Type 21 frigate	Yarrow Shipbuilders	Glasgow	United Kingdom	For Royal Navy.
19 January	Royal Viking Sea	Cruise ship	Wärtsilä Helsinki New Shipyard	Helsinki	Finland	For Royal Viking Line
25 January	Chitose	Chikugo-class destroyer escort			Japan	For Japanese Navy.
January	Al Bushra	Patrol boat	Brooke Marine Ltd.	Lowestoft	United Kingdom	For Royal Omani Navy.
1 February	Sea-Land Trade	SL-7-class container ship	Rotterdamsche Droogdocks Maatschappij N.V.	Rotterdam	Netherlands	For Sea-Land Service
3 February	Truett	Knox-class frigate	Avondale Shipyard	Avondale, Louisiana	United States	For United States Navy.
17 February	Sovereign	Swiftsure-class submarine			United Kingdom	For Royal Navy.
1 March	Al Nejah	Patrol boat	Brooke Marine Ltd.	Lowestoft	United Kingdom	For Royal Omani Navy.
6 March	Baltic Enterprise	RO-RO container ship	Rauma Repola Oy	Rauma	Finland	For United Baltic Corporation.
9 March	U21	Type 206 submarine	Howaldtswerke-Deutsche Werft	Kiel	West Germany	For German Navy.
17 March	Aurella	Ferry	J. J. Sietas Schiffswerft	Hamburg	West Germany	For SF Line
17 March	Manchester Vigour	Container ship	Appledore Shipbuilders Ltd.	Appledore	United Kingdom	For Manchester Liners Ltd.
17 March	Viking 4	Ferry	Meyer Werft	Papenburg	West Germany	For Rederi Ab Sally
24 March	Valdez	Knox-class frigate	Avondale Shipyard	Avondale, Louisiana	United States	For United States Navy.
27 March	U22	Type 206 submarine	Nordseewerke	Emden	West Germany	For German Navy.
1 April	Sea-Land Finance	SL-7-class container ship	Nordseewerke	Emden	West Germany	For Sea-Land Service
3 April	San Luis	Type 206 submarine	Tandanor	Buenos Aires	Argentina	For Argentine Navy
4 April	Eversand	Buoy tender	Schichau Unterweser	Bremerhaven	West Germany	For Wasser- und Schifffahrtsamtes Bremerhaven
1 May	Sea-Land Market	SL-7-class container ship	AG Weser	Bremen	West Germany	For Sea-Land Service
12 May	Moinester	Knox-class frigate	Avondale Shipyard	Avondale, Louisiana	United States	For United States Navy.
25 May	U25	Type 206 submarine	Howaldtswerke-Deutsche Werft	Kiel	West Germany	For German Navy.
2 June	L. Mendel Rivers	Sturgeon-class submarine	Newport News Shipbuilding	Newport News, Virginia	United States	For United States Navy.
17 March	Manchester Zeal	Container ship	Appledore Shipbuilders Ltd.	Appledore	United Kingdom	For Manchester Liners Ltd.
16 June	Stena Shipper	Ferry	A Vuyk & Zonen's Scheepswerven	Amsterdam	Netherlands	For Stena Line
26 June	U24	Type 206 submarine	Nordseewerke	Emden	West Germany	For German Navy.
6 July	Svendborg Mærsk	container ship	Ishikawajima-Harima Heavy Industries	Aioi	Japan	For Maersk
23 July	Razumnyy	Project 1135 large anti-submarine ship	Yantar	Kaliningrad	Soviet Union	For Soviet Navy.
28 July	Wimpey Seadog	Offshore supply vessel	Appledore Shipbuilders Ltd.	Appledore	United Kingdom	For Wimpey (Marine) Ltd.
30 July	Birmingham	Type 42 destroyer	Cammell Laird	Birkenhead	United Kingdom	For Royal Navy.
4 August	Glenard P. Lipscomb	Unique nuclear-powered submarine	Electric Boat	Groton, Connecticut	United States	For United States Navy.
4 August	Olympic Brilliance	Tanker	Harland & Wolff	Belfast	United Kingdom	For Lakeport Navigation Co.
6 August	Espresso Cagliari	Espresso Livorno-class ferry	Cant. Nav. "Luigi Orlando"	Livorno	Italy	For Trans Tirreno Express S.p.A.
13 August	Hiei	Haruna-class destroyer			Japan	For Japanese Navy.
21 August	U27	Type 206 submarine	Howaldtswerke-Deutsche Werft	Kiel	West Germany	For German Navy.
28 August	Niyodo	Chikugo-class destroyer escort			Japan	For Japanese Navy.
31 August	Dana Regina	Ferry	Aalborg Skibsværft A/S	Aalborg	Denmark	For DFDS
31 August	Baltic Progress		Rauma Repola Oy	Rauma	Finland	For United Baltic Corporation.
12 September	Chartres	Train ferry	Dubigeon-Normandie SA	Nantes	France	For SNCF
17 September	Starman	Ro-ro heavy lift ship	Brooke Marine Ltd.	Lowestoft	United Kingdom	For Starman Ltd.
1 October	Mount Newman	Bulk carrier	Harland & Wolff	Belfast	United Kingdom	For Furness Withy.
10 October	Islay	Type 209 submarine	Howaldtswerke-Deutsche Werft	Kiel	West Germany	For Peruvian Navy.
13 October	Wimpey Sealion	Offshore supply vessel	Appledore Shipbuilders Ltd.	Appledore	United Kingdom	For Wimpey (Marine) Ltd.
20 October	Mikolaj Kopernik	Ferry	Trosvik Mekaniske Verksteder	Brevik,	Norway	For Polskie Linie Oceaniczne.
21 October	Marshal Timoshenko	Project 1134A Berkut A large anti-submarine ship	Zhdanov	Leningrad,	Soviet Union	For Soviet Navy.
23 October	Akigumo	Yamagumo-class destroyer			Japan	For Japanese Navy.
30 October	Agdlek	Agdlek-class cutter cutter	Svendborg Ship Yard		Denmark	For Royal Danish Navy.
1 November	Sea-Land Resource	SL-7-class container ship	Rotterdamsche Droogdocks Maatschappij N.V.	Rotterdam	Netherlands	For Sea-Land Service
5 November	U29	Type 206 submarine	Howaldtswerke-Deutsche Werft	Kiel	West Germany	For German Navy.
6 November	Mamba	Patrol boat	Brooke Marine Ltd.	Lowestoft	United Kingdom	For Kenyan Navy.
10 November	Spruance	Spruance-class destroyer	Ingalls Shipbuilding	Pascagoula, Mississippi	United States	For United States Navy.
20 November	U26	Type 206 submarine	Nordseewerke	Emden	West Germany	For German Navy.
27 November	Jupiter	Ferry	James Lamont & Co	Port Glasgow	United Kingdom	For Caledonian MacBrayne
1 December	Tarawa	Tarawa-class amphibious assault ship	Ingalls Shipbuilding	Pascagoula, Mississippi	United States	For United States Navy.
1 December	Sea-Land Commerce	SL-7 container ship	AG Weser	Bremen	West Germany	Sea-Land Service
6 December	Arco Severn	Dredger	Appledore Shipbuilders Ltd.	Appledore	United Kingdom	For Consolidated Gold Fields Ltd.
Unknown date	Al Mansur	Patrol boat	Brooke Marine Ltd.	Lowestoft	United Kingdom	For Royal Omani Navy.
Unknown date	Duke of Normandy	Tug	J. Bolson & Son Ltd.	Poole	United Kingdom	For The States of Jersey.
Unknown date	Gu Tian	Concrete cargo ship		Mawei	China	
