= List of ship launches in 1972 =

The list of ship launches in 1972 includes a chronological list of all ships launched in 1972.

Date	Ship	Class / type	Builder	Location	Country	Notes
26 January	Bore X		Rauma	Rauma-Reopla Oy	Finland	For Angfartygs Ab Bore
1 February	Haruna	Haruna-class destroyer			Japan	For Japanese Navy.
1 February	Proteus	Type 209 submarine	Howaldtswerke-Deutsche Werft	Kiel	West Germany	For Greek Navy.
1 February	U-14	Type 206 submarine	Emden	Nordseewerke	West Germany	For German Navy.
19 February	Cavalla	Sturgeon-class submarine	Electric Boat	Groton, Connecticut	United States	For United States Navy.
19 February	Westerland	Ferry	Mützelfeldwerft	Cuxhaven	West Germany	For HADAG.
21 February	Schleswig-Holstein	Ferry	Schiffswerft J.J. Sietas	Hamburg-Neuenfelde	West Germany	For Wyker Dampfschiffs-Reederei Föhr-Amrum GmbH
26 February	Saint Eloi	Ferry	Cantieri Navali di Pietra Ligure	Pietra Ligure	Italy	For Angleterre-Lorraine-Alsace Société Anonyme de Navigation
11 March	Kiska	Kilauea-class ammunition ship	Ingalls Shipbuilding	Pascagoula, Mississippi	United States	For United States Navy.
13 March	Fallow Deer	Container ship	Appledore Shipbuilders Ltd.	Appledore	United Kingdom	For London & Rochester Trading Co. Ltd.
16 March	Antelope	Type 21 frigate	Vosper Thornycroft	Southampton, England	United Kingdom	For Royal Navy
18 March	Jesse L. Brown	Knox-class frigate	Avondale Shipyard	Avondale, Louisiana	United States	For United States Navy.
18 March	Isoshio	Uzushio-class submarine			Japan	For Japanese Navy.
24 March	Kattegat	Ferry	Helsingør Skibs & Maskinbygg	Helsingør	Denmark	For Jydsk Færgefart A/S
30 March	Aokumo	Yamagumo-class destroyer			Japan	For Japanese Navy.
March	Delfin	Daphné-class submarine	Bazán	Cartagena	Spain	For Spanish Navy.
15 April	Ainsworth	Knox-class frigate	Avondale Shipyard	Avondale, Louisiana	United States	For United States Navy.
22 April	Fort Fisher	Anchorage-class dock landing ship	General Dynamics Quincy Shipbuilding	Quincy, Massachusetts	United States	For United States Navy.
26 April	Belinda	Bulk carrier	Harland & Wolff	Belfast	United Kingdom	For Mascot A/S.
1 May	Sea-Land Galloway	SL-7 class container ship	AG Weser	Bremen	West Germany	For Sea-Land Service
6 May	Wesertal		Rickmers Werft	Bremerhaven	West Germany	For JA Reinecke & Co.
9 May	Seaward	Cruise ship	Cantieri Navali del Tirreno & Riuniti	Riva Trigoso	Italy	For Norwegian Cruise Line
12 May	München	LASH carrier	Cockerill	Hoboken, Antwerp	Belgium	
13 May	G.W.191	Barge	Appledore Shipbuilders Ltd.	Appledore	United Kingdom	For Wimpey (Marine) Ltd.
13 May	Nimitz	Nimitz-class aircraft carrier	Newport News Shipbuilding	Newport News, Virginia	United States	For United States Navy.
16 May	Dane	Fishing trawler	Brooke Marine Ltd.	Lowestoft	United Kingdom	For British United Trawlers Finance Ltd.
18 May	Amey III	Dredger	Appledore Shipbuilders Ltd.	Appledore	United Kingdom	For Amey Marine Ltd.
24 May	Caernarvon	Tanker	Appledore Shipbuilders Ltd.	Appledore	United Kingdom	For Shell-Mex & B. P.
26 May	Antares		Rauma Repola Oy	Rauma	Finland	For Finska Ångfartygs Ab.
3 June	Miller	Knox-class frigate	Avondale Shipyard	Avondale, Louisiana	United States	For United States Navy.
10 June	Tunny	Sturgeon-class submarine	Ingalls Shipbuilding	Pascagoula, Mississippi	United States	For United States Navy.
12 June	Almirante Condell	Condell-class frigate	Yarrow Shipbuilders	Scotstoun, Glasgow	United Kingdom	For Chilean Navy
12 June	Remuera	Container ship	Swan Hunter	High Walker	United Kingdom	For Peninsular and Oriental Steam Navigation Company
15 June	U-15	Type 206 submarine	HDW	Kiel	West Germany	For German Navy.
15 June	Espresso Livorno	Espresso Livorno-class ferry	Cant. Nav. "Luigi Orlando"	Livorno	Italy	For Soc. Trahetti del Mediterraneo.
29 June	Iwase	Chikugo-class destroyer escort			Japan	For Japanese Navy.
1 July	South Carolina	California-class cruiser	Newport News Shipbuilding	Newport News, Virginia	United States	For United States Navy.
8 July	Export Leader	Container ship	Bath Iron Works	Bath Maine	United States	For American Export-Isbrandtsen Lines
11 July	Bore I	Ferry	Wärtsilä	Turku	Finland	For Steamship Company Bore / Silja Line
12 August	Thomas C. Hart	Knox-class frigate	Avondale Shipyard	Avondale, Louisiana	United States	For United States Navy.
22 August	Plymouth	Tanker	Appledore Shipbuilders Ltd.	Appledore	United Kingdom	For Shell-Mex & B. P.
28 August	Bni Nsar	Ferry	Kanda Shipbuilding	Kure, Hiroshima	Japan	
28 August	Diana	Ferry	Meyer Werft	Papenburg	West Germany	For Rederi AB Slite / Viking Line
29 August	U-16	Type 206 submarine	Nordseewerke	Emden	West Germany	For German Navy.
1 September	Sea-Land McLean	SL-7 class container ship	Rotterdamsche D.D.Mij N.V.	Rotterdam	Netherlands	For Sea-Land Service
1 September	Sea-Land Exchange	SL-7 class container ship	Rotterdamsche D.D.Mij N.V.	Rotterdam	Netherlands	For Sea-Land Service
8 September	Orion		Rauma Repola Oy	Rauma	Finland	For Finska Ångfartygs Ab.
5 October	Götaland	Ferry	A/S Nakskov Skibsværf	Nakskov	Denmark	For Statens Järnvägar
7 October	Olympic Banner	Supertanker	Harland & Wolff	Belfast	United Kingdom	For Carlow Maritime Panama.
10 October	U-17	Type 206 submarine	HDW	Kiel	West Germany	For German Navy.
11 October	Swansea	Tanker	Appledore Shipbuilders Ltd.	Appledore	United Kingdom	For Shell-Mex & B. P.
14 October	Globtik Tokyo	Oil tanker	Ishikawajima Harima Heavy Industries	Kure	Japan	For Globtik Tankers
21 October	Capodanno	Knox-class frigate	Avondale Shipyard	Avondale, Louisiana	United States	For United States Navy.
24 October	Hércules	Type 42 destroyer	Vickers Shipbuilding and Engineering	Barrow-in-Furness, England	United Kingdom	For Argentine Navy.
31 October	U-18	Type 206 submarine	Nordseewerke	Emden	West Germany	For German Navy.
October	Tonina	Daphné-class submarine	Bazán	Cartagena	Spain	For Spanish Navy.
1 November	Kalamazoo	Wichita-class replenishment oiler	General Dynamics Quincy Shipbuilding	Quincy, Massachusetts	United States	For United States Navy.
4 November	Hughes Glomar Explorer		Sun Shipbuilding & Drydock Co.	Chester, Pennsylvania	United States	
9 November	Salta	Type 209 submarine	Tandanor	Buenos Aires	Argentina	For Argentine Navy.
10 November	Bore XI		Rauma	Rauma-Reopla Oy	Finland	For Angfartygs Ab Bore.
22 November	Narushio	Uzushio-class submarine			Japan	For Japanese Navy.
22 November	Pict	Fishing trawler	Brooke Marine Ltd.	Lowestoft	United Kingdom	For British United Trawlers Finance Ltd.
23 November	Active	Type 21 frigate	Vosper Thornycroft	Southampton	United Kingdom	For Royal Navy
25 November	Dundee	Tanker	Appledore Shipbuilders Ltd.	Appledore	United Kingdom	For Shell-Mex & B. P.
5 December	Funny Girl	Ferry	Stader Schiffswerft	Stade	West Germany	For Reederei Cassen Eils
15 December	U-19	Type 206 submarine	HDW	Kiel	West Germany	For German Navy.
15 December	Sirius		Rauma Repola Oy	Rauma	Finland	For Finska Ångfartygs Ab
16 December	Pharris	Knox-class frigate	Avondale Shipyard	Avondale, Louisiana	United States	For United States Navy.
26 December	Kiev	Kiev-class aircraft carrier	Chernomorskiy yard	Nikolayev	Soviet Union	For Soviet Navy.
Unknown date	Rhine Maru	Kamakura Maru-type container ship	Mitsubishi Heavy Industries	Kobe	Japan	For Mitsui O.S.K. Lines
