= Tiangu =

Tiangu or Tian Gu or variation, may refer to:

- Tiangu (天孤, Tiān-gū), one of the 108 Stars of Destiny
- Tiangu property rights in Traditional Chinese law
- Cheng Tiangu (程·天固), Mayor of Guangzhou and then Ministry of Economic Affairs (Taiwan)

== See also ==
- Gu (disambiguation)
- Tian (disambiguation)
- Gutian (disambiguation)
