= Gutian =

Gutian may refer to:

== China ==
- Gutian County (古田县), Fujian
  - Gutian railway station
  - Gutian dialect, a dialect of Chinese spoken in Gutian
  - Gutian Massacre (1895), massacre of Christians in Gutian County
- Gutian, Liancheng County (姑田镇), town in Liancheng County, Fujian
- Gutian, Shanghang County (古田镇), town in Shanghang County, Fujian
  - Gutian Congress, meeting of the Chinese Communist Party in 1929
- Gu Tian (古田), a cargo ship, the largest concrete ship built in China
- Gutian (骨田), a Chinese animator on YouTube and Chinese platforms, creator of "Terrible Mouse"

== Near East ==
- Gutians, a Bronze Age people of West Asia
  - Gutian language, the unclassified language of the Gutian people
  - Gutian dynasty of Sumer (𒄖𒋾𒌝𒆠), dynasty in Mesopotamia

== See also ==
- Gu (disambiguation)
- Tian (disambiguation)
