= SS Altair =

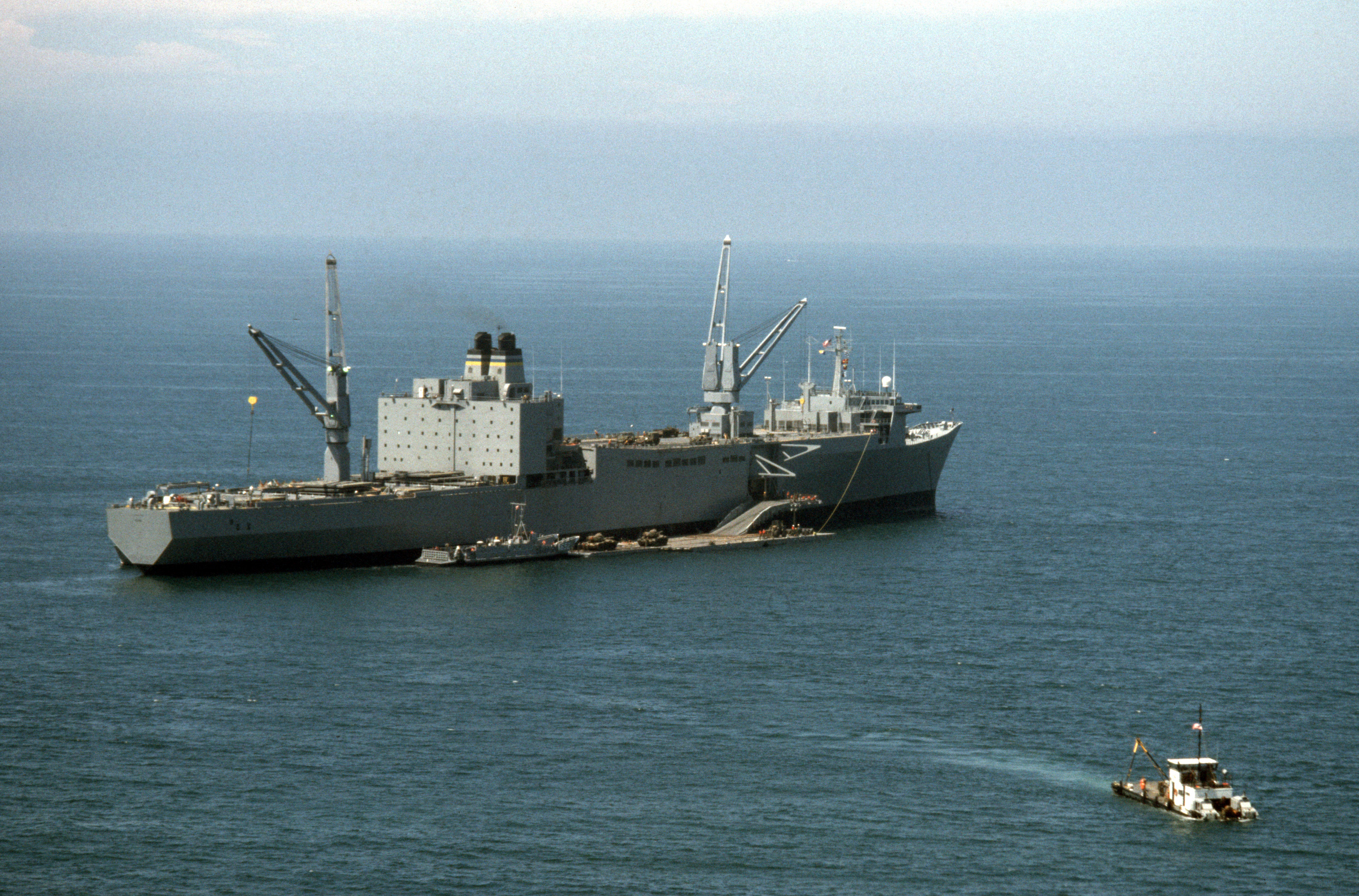
- USNS Altair (T-AKR-291) loading ground support equipment onto a floating causeway during Exercise Gallant Eagle 86.

History

United States
- Namesake: Altair
- Operator: United States Navy
- Builder: Rheinstahl Nordseewerke
- Launched: 1 April 1973
- Acquired: 5 January 1982
- Identification: IMO number: 7315571; MMSI number: 368988000; Callsign: NRZA
- Honors and awards: National Defense Service Medal; Southwest Asia Service Medal; Kuwait Liberation Medal
- Status: Ready Reserve

General characteristics
- Class & type: Algol class vehicle cargo ship
- Displacement: 55,355 tons (full)
- Length: 946 ft 2 in (288 m)
- Beam: 105 ft 6 in (32 m)
- Draft: 36 ft 4 in (11 m)
- Propulsion: 2 × Foster-Wheeler boilers, 875 psi (61.6kg/cm2); 2 × GE MST-19 steam turbines; 120,000 hp (89.5 MW)
- Speed: 33 knots
- Capacity: 700+ military vehicles (including trucks, tanks, and helicopters)
- Complement: 43 civilians, 12 military technicians (fully operational), 18 civilians (reduced operating status)
- Armament: None
- Aviation facilities: Landing pad

SS Altair (T-AKR 291) is an Algol class vehicle cargo ship that is currently maintained by the United States Maritime Administration as part of the Military Sealift Command's Ready Reserve Force (RRF). She was built as a high speed container ship by Rheinstahl Nordseewerke in Emden, West Germany, hull no. 431, for Sea-Land Service, Inc. and named SS Sea-Land Finance, USCG ON 550722, IMO 7315571. Due to her high operating cost, she was sold to the United States Navy on 5 January 1982 as USNS Altair (T-AK-291).

In keeping with the pattern of the naming the Algol-class ships after bright stars, the Altair was named after Altair, the brightest star in the constellation Aquila and the twelfth brightest star in the night sky.

== Conversion ==
Conversion began on 28 July 1984 at Avondale Shipyards in New Orleans, Louisiana. Her cargo hold was redesigned into a series of decks connected by ramps so vehicles can be driven into and out of the cargo hold for fast loading and unloading. She was also fitted with two sets of two cranes; one set located at midship capable of lifting 35 tons, and another set located aft capable of lifting 50 tons. She was delivered to the Military Sealift Command on 13 November 1985 as USNS Altair (T-AKR 291).

== Service ==
When not active, Algol is kept in reduced operating status due to her high operating cost, initially a ROS-3 (96 hour) and currently a ROS-5 (120 hour) activation readiness. Altair took part in the Persian Gulf War in 1990. Along with the other seven Algol class cargo ships, she transported 14 percent of all cargo delivered between the United States and Saudi Arabia during and after the war.

On 1 October 2007, Altair was transferred to the United States Maritime Administration. On 1 October 2008, she was transferred to the Ready Reserve Force, losing her USNS designation. If activated, Altair will report to the Military Sealift Command Atlantic Fleet. She remains berthed at Marrero, LA alongside her sistership SS Bellatrix (T-AKR-288).
