= SS Capella =

US Navy Algol class cargo ship launched 1972

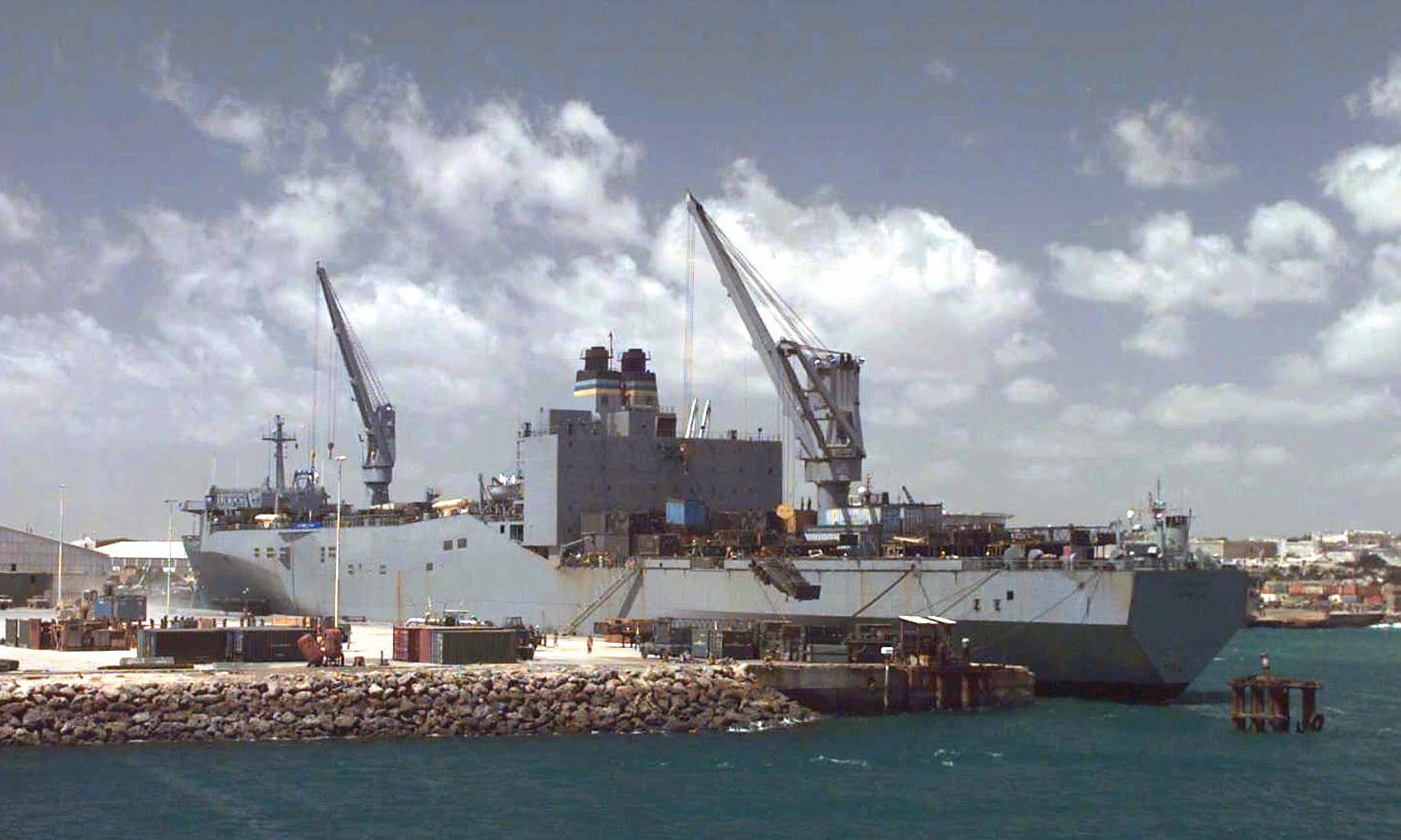
- USNS Capella (T-AKR-293) offloading military vehicles and supplies in the port of Mogadishu in support of Operation Restore Hope.

History

United States
- Namesake: Capella
- Operator: United States Navy
- Builder: Rotterdamsche D.D.Mij N.V.
- Launched: 1 September 1972
- Acquired: 16 April 1982
- Identification: IMO number: 7223508; MMSI number: 367186000; Callsign: NBXO
- Honors and awards: National Defense Service Medal; Southwest Asia Service Medal; Kuwait Liberation Medal
- Status: Ready Reserve

General characteristics
- Class & type: Algol class vehicle cargo ship
- Displacement: 55,355 tons (full)
- Length: 946 ft 2 in (288 m)
- Beam: 105 ft 6 in (32 m)
- Draft: 36 ft 4 in (11 m)
- Propulsion: 2 × Foster-Wheeler boilers, 875 psi (61.6 kg/cm2); 2 × GE MST-19 steam turbines; 120,000 hp (89.5 MW)
- Speed: 33 knots
- Capacity: 700+ military vehicles (including trucks, tanks, and helicopters)
- Complement: 43 civilians, 12 military technicians (fully operational), 18 civilians (reduced operating status)
- Armament: None
- Aviation facilities: Landing pad

SS Capella (T-AKR 293) is an Algol class vehicle cargo ship that is currently maintained by the United States Maritime Administration as part of the Military Sealift Command's Ready Reserve Force (RRF). She was built as a high speed container ship by Rotterdamsche D.D.Mij N.V. in Rotterdam, Netherlands, hull no. 330, for Sea-Land Service, Inc. and named SS Sea-Land McLean, USCG ON 540413, IMO 7223508, after Sea-Land's founder Malcom McLean. Due to her high operating cost, she was sold to the United States Navy on 16 April 1982 as USNS Capella (T-AK-293).

In keeping with the pattern of the naming the Algol-class ships after bright stars, the Capella was named after Capella, the brightest star in the constellation Auriga, the sixth brightest in the night sky.

== Conversion ==
Conversion began on 23 October 1982 at Pennsylvania Shipbuilding in Chester, Pennsylvania. Her cargo hold was redesigned into a series of decks connected by ramps so vehicles can be driven into and out of the cargo hold for fast loading and unloading. She was also fitted with two sets of two cranes; one set located at midship capable of lifting 35 tons, and another set located aft capable of lifting 50 tons. She was delivered to the Military Sealift Command on 1 July 1984 as USNS Capella (T-AKR 293).

== Service ==
When not active, Capella is kept in reduced operating status due to her high operating cost. At present, she can be activated and ready to sail in 120 hours, also known as ROS-5 status. Capella took part in the Persian Gulf War in 1990. Along with the other seven Algol class cargo ships, she transported 14 percent of all cargo delivered between the United States and Saudi Arabia during and after the war. In 1994, Capella, along with USNS Denebola (T-AKR-289), worked with NATO forces on convoy exercises in the Mediterranean.

On 1 October 2007, Capella was transferred to the United States Maritime Administration. On 1 October 2008, she was transferred to the Ready Reserve Force at Ready Reserve Fleet Alameda, losing her USNS designation. In December of 2024 the vessel departed San Francisco for the United States Maritime Administration Beaumont Reserve Fleet at Beaumont, TX in preparation for an eventual downgrade from the Ready Reserve Force. In the interim the ship remains in ROS-5 status.

If activated, Capella will report to the Military Sealift Command Atlantic Fleet
