= SS Denebola (T-AKR-289) =

US Navy Algol class cargo ship launched 1973

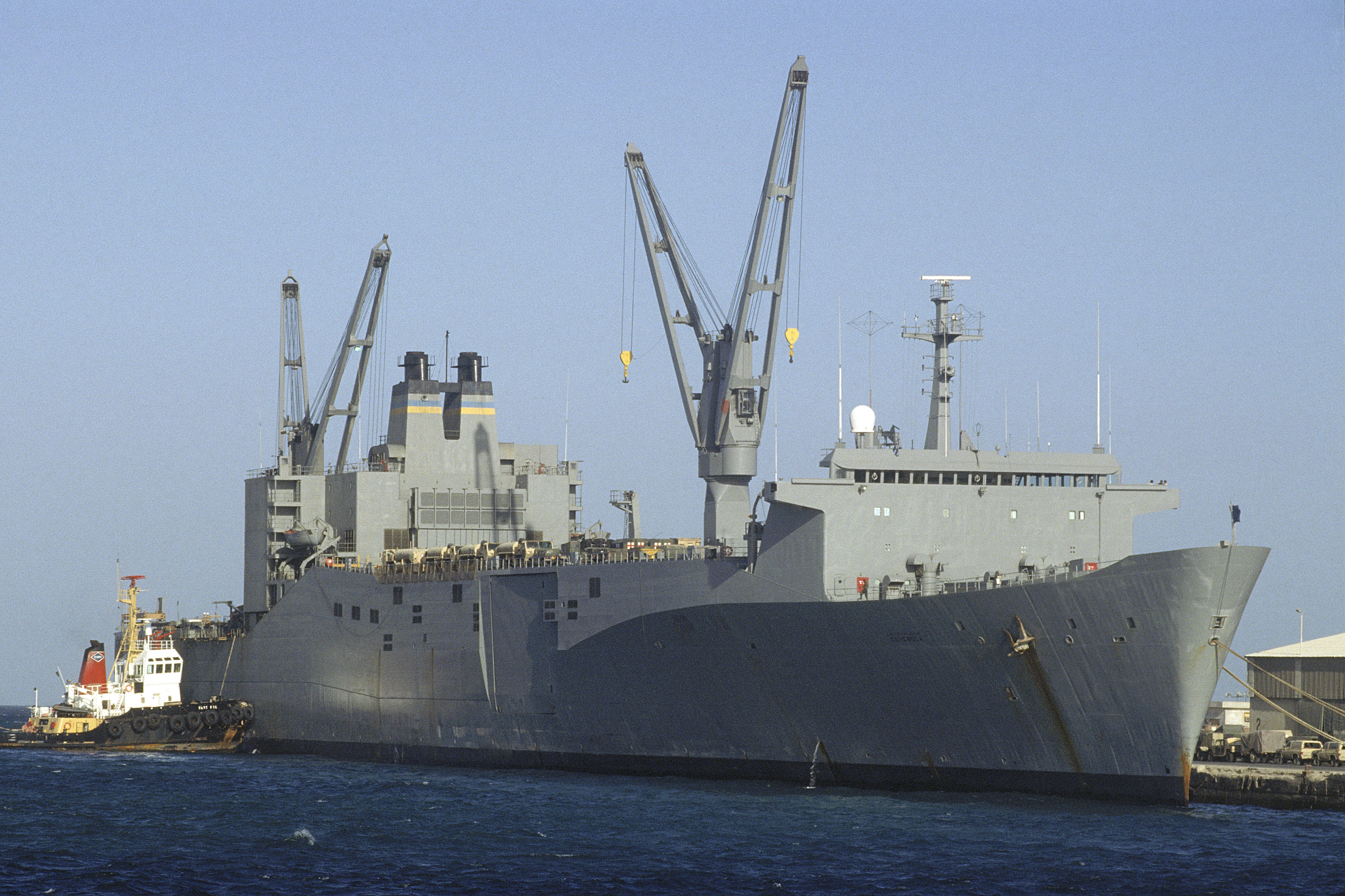
- USNS Denebola (T-AKR-289) in Mogadishu, Somalia, on 7 February 1994.

History

United States
- Name: SS Denebola
- Namesake: Denebola
- Owner: United States Maritime Administration
- Operator: Keystone Shipping Company
- Port of registry: Norfolk, VA
- Builder: Rotterdamsche D.D.Mij N.V
- Launched: 1 November 1973
- Acquired: 27 October 1981
- Identification: IMO number: 7325253; MMSI number: 367190000; Callsign: NDSP
- Honors and awards: National Defense Service Medal; Southwest Asia Service Medal; Kuwait Liberation Medal
- Status: Ready Reserve in the Beaumont Reserve Fleet

General characteristics
- Class & type: Algol-class vehicle cargo ship
- Displacement: 55,355 tons (full)
- Length: 946 ft 2 in (288 m)
- Beam: 105 ft 6 in (32 m)
- Draft: 36 ft 4 in (11 m)
- Propulsion: 2 × Foster-Wheeler boilers, 875 psi (6,030 kPa); 2 × GE MST-19 steam turbines; 120,000 hp (89,000 kW)
- Speed: 33 knots (61 km/h; 38 mph)
- Capacity: 700+ military vehicles (including trucks, tanks, and helicopters)
- Complement: 43 civilians, 12 military technicians (fully operational), 18 civilians (reduced operating status)
- Aviation facilities: Landing pad

SS Denebola (T-AKR 289) is an Algol-class vehicle cargo ship that is currently maintained by the United States Maritime Administration as part of the Military Sealift Command's Ready Reserve Force (RRF). She was built as a high speed container ship by Rotterdamsche D.D.Mij N.V. in Rotterdam, Netherlands, hull no. 332, for Sea-Land Service, Inc. and named SS Sea-Land Resource, USCG ON 550723, IMO 7325253. Due to her high operating cost, she was sold to the United States Navy in October 1981 as USNS Denebola (T-AK-289).

In keeping with the pattern of the naming the Algol-class ships after bright stars, the Denebola was named after Denebola, the third-brightest star in the constellation Leo.

== Conversion ==
Conversion began on 22 November 1983 at Pennsylvania Shipbuilding in Chester, Pennsylvania. Her cargo hold was redesigned into a series of decks connected by ramps so vehicles can be driven into and out of the cargo hold for fast loading and unloading. She was also fitted with two sets of two cranes; one set located at midship capable of lifting 35 tons, and another set located aft capable of lifting 50 tons. She was delivered to the Military Sealift Command on 10 October 1985 as USNS Denebola (T-AKR 289).

== Service ==
When not active, Pollux was kept in a reduced operating status due to her high operating cost, initially a ROS-3 (96 hour) and later a ROS-5 (120 hour) activation readiness. Denebola took part in the Persian Gulf War in 1990. Along with the other seven Algol class cargo ships, she transported 14 percent of all cargo delivered between the United States and Saudi Arabia during and after the war. In 1994, Denebola, along with USNS Capella (T-AKR-293), worked with NATO forces on convoy exercises in the Mediterranean.

On 1 October 2007, Denebola was transferred to the United States Maritime Administration. On 1 October 2008, she was transferred to the Ready Reserve Force, losing her USNS designation.

Together with sistership SS Antares, Denebola were berthed in Baltimore Harbor for many years, however in July 2024 she departed Baltimore harbor bound for the US Maritime Administration Reserve Fleet at Beaumont, Texas. The vessel remains in ROS-5 (120 hour) activation readiness. If activated, Denebola will report to the Military Sealift Command Atlantic Fleet and change her prefix designation from SS to USNS.

== Citations ==
U.S. Coast Guard District 5 Local Notice to Mariners Week 49/20 8 DEC 20, at page 25
