= GU =

GU, Gu, or gu may refer to:

== Arts and entertainment ==
- Gu (instrument), Chinese drums
  - Bangu (drum), or gu, a Chinese frame drum
- Global Underground, an electronic dance music compilation series
- GU Comics, an online comic
- .hack//G.U., a video game series
- Godzilla: Unleashed, a video game
- Gu (film), a 2024 Indian horror fantasy thriller film

== Businesses and organisations ==
=== Businesses ===
- Gü, a dessert manufacturing company
- GU (retailer), Japanese clothing brand
- GU Energy Labs, a sports nutrition product manufacturer

=== Universities ===
- Galgotias University, Dankaur, Uttar Pradesh, India
- Gandhara University, Peshawar, Khyber Pakhtunkhwa, Pakistan
- Gannon University, Erie, Pennsylvania, United States
- Gauhati University, Guwahati, Assam, India
- Georgetown University, Washington D.C., United States
- Ghazi University, Dera Ghazi Khan, Punjab, Pakistan
- Gomal University, Dera Ismail Khan, Khyber Pakhtunkhwa, Pakistan
- Gonzaga University, Spokane, Washington, United States
- University of Gothenburg, Gothenburg, Sweden (Swedish: Göteborgs universitet)
- Grantham University, now University of Arkansas Grantham, Kansas City, Missouri, United States
- Griffith University, several campuses in Brisbane and the Gold Coast area, Australia
- University of Guilan, Guilan, Rasht, Iran
- Gujarat University, Ahmedabad, Gujarat, India

== People ==
- Gu (surname) (顾), a Chinese family name
- Gǔ (surname) (谷), a Chinese family name
- Gǔ (surname 古), a Chinese family name
- Gū (surname) (辜), a Chinese family name

== Places ==
- Gu County, Shanxi, China
- Gu, Chabahar, Iran
- Gu (administrative division), South Korea
- Gu's Park, former name of Fuxing Park in Shanghai, China
- GU postcode area, or Guildford postcode area, England
- Guam, ISO 3166 code GU

== Other uses ==
- gu, gravity unit, used in geology and equal to 10^{-4} Gal.
- Gu (digraph)
- Gu (god), a spirit that appears in several African religions
- Gu (poison), a venom-based poison associated with cultures of south China
- Gu (vessel), a type of ancient Chinese ritual bronze vessel
- Gujarati language, ISO 639-1 language code gu
- gu, several characters in the Sumerian language
- Gu (kana), or ku
- GU, a prefix for several types of bi-pin lamp base
- GU, current proper abbreviation for the foreign military intelligence agency of the General Staff of the Armed Forces of the Russian Federation known as the Main Directorate of the General Staff of the Armed Forces of the Russian Federation, or Гла́вное управле́ние Генера́льного шта́ба Вооружённых сил Росси́йской Федера́ции, romanized: Glavnoje upravlenije General'nogo shtaba Vooruzhonnykh sil Rossiyskoy Federatsii or commonly referred to as the GRU (Russian Federation) which was formerly the Main Intelligence Directorate

== See also ==
- Gue, a stringed instrument
