= Trailer Bridge =

American freight service company

Trailer Bridge, Inc.
- Type: Private
- Industry: Transportation
- Founded: 1991
- Founder: Malcom McLean
- Headquarters: Jacksonville, Florida, USA
- Key people: Mitch Luciano, President/CEO; Nate Coverdale, VP Finance
- Services: Freight transport, maritime transport, vehicle shipping, vessel chartering, logistics, Intermodal freight transport, Truckload shipping and Less than truckload shipping
- Revenue: $118.2 million (2010)
- Number of employees: 214 (2014)
- Parent: SEACOR Holdings
- Website: trailerbridge.com

Trailer Bridge, Inc. is a freight service company headquartered in Jacksonville, Florida. They offer international and domestic shipping with primary international calls to San Juan, Puerto Rico and Puerto Plata, Dominican Republic.

== History ==
Trailer Bridge was founded in 1991 by Malcom McLean, who is recognized in the industry as "The Father of Containerization". McLean had previously started McLean Trucking Company in Winston-Salem, North Carolina, which he built into one of the largest trucking companies in the United States. He saw the need for a service that could, in the words of the company, provide "true single-carrier responsibility across the United States and on to Puerto Rico". In April 1991, McLean founded Trailer Bridge, and in the following February, Trailer Bridge made its first shipment from Jacksonville, Florida, to San Juan, Puerto Rico.

In 1997, Trailer Bridge went public on NASDAQ and moved its headquarters to Jacksonville. Over the years, it expanded its fleet and capacity, and in 2000, it unveiled its shipment tracking tool. In 2004, Trailer Bridge purchased all of Kadampanattu Corporation's stock, thus gaining two 736-foot, triple-deck, ro/ro barges. In 2010, Trailer began offering weekly service to and from Jacksonville and Puerto Plata, Dominican Republic.

During the 4th quarter of 2011, the company had notes totaling $82.5 million come due. Unable to meet this obligation, they filed Chapter 11 bankruptcy. In the first quarter of 2012, a judge approved their reorganization plan which effectively gave Seacor Holdings control of the company with three of seven directors on the Trailer Bridge board. A press release from Trailer Bridge stated that Seacor Holdings “intends to use its extensive maritime transportation experience to assist the company in implementing its strategy to return it to sustainable and profitable operations.” Seacor Holdings did not comment, but a Credit Suisse analyst stated, “Distressed acquisition opportunities [are the company's] bread and butter. Management does not like losses; therefore, we do not expect Seacor to hold onto businesses not generating their cost of capital.”

In 2012, Trailer Bridge celebrated the 20th anniversary of its inaugural voyage and five years of service to Puerto Plata, DR, and also reached its one millionth customer booking, established TB Logistics, and added more containers, making it one of the world's largest fleets.

Trailer Bridge was recognized in 2016 as one of Jacksonville's best places to work by the Jacksonville Business Journal. In 2021, Trailer Bridge announced partnership with supply chain and logistics SaaS firm Mastery Systems.

== Operations ==
Trailer Bridge is a U.S. flag (Jones Act) transportation provider and carrier offering cargo shipping, vessel chartering, barge chartering, and vehicle shipping services between Jacksonville, Florida, San Juan, Puerto Rico, and the Dominican Republic on a weekly basis. The company's logistics management services include Less than truckload shipping, truckload, and intermodal services through its third party logistics unit. Its fleet of 53-foot by 102-inch containers offers about 40% more capacity compared to other containers and their 3,860 cubic feet translates to more value for customers. Trailer Bridge also offers car shipping to Puerto Rico and the Dominican Republic. Customers can use Trailer Bridge's AutoBridge service to get an instant quote for shipping a car to Puerto Rico from Florida and more. And with TB Quick Track, customers can track their shipments.

Trailers destined for Puerto Rico are picked up almost anywhere in the continental U.S. and driven to Jacksonville, where they are loaded onto a barge for the five-day trip to San Juan. In 2007, the company added the Dominican Republic as a shipping destination and is, according to The Jacksonville Business Journal, the only service "between the U.S. and the Dominican Republic using U.S.-flagged ships." The company expects to service Cuba when the US permits it.

The barges owned by Trailer Bridge have no propulsion system; instead, they rely on ocean-going tugboats supplied by other companies to tow the vessels to and from their destinations.

The company leases 26.5 acres (107,000 m^{2}) of land at the southwestern tip of Blount Island from the Jacksonville Port Authority where they dock, load and unload their barges.

== Public company ==
The company went public in 1997. According to Wright Investors’ Service, at the end of 2007, the company operated a fleet of 114 tractors, 241 high-cube trailers, 3,882 53-foot-high cube containers and 3,177 53-foot chassis to transport truckload freight. They also owned two 736-foot triple-deck, roll-on/roll-off (RORO) ocean-going barges and three 403-foot Triplestack box carriers. Their stock reached an all-time high of $14.75 in 2007.

== Environment ==
In 2000, Trailer Bridge joined the U.S. Environmental Protection Agency's Climate Wise Program to collaborate with others on innovative ways to boost energy efficiencies and improve pollution conditions. Then, in 2006, it joined the SmartWay^{SM} Transport Partnership where the EPA and freight industry work together to not only increase energy efficiencies and improve air pollution but also to reduce greenhouse gases. Its efforts in this organization earned it the SmartWay^{SM} Transport Partnership's Environmental Excellence Award. In 2010, Trailer Bridge made the change to Ultra Low Sulfur Diesel. This fuel exceeds two IMO standards: 1) no more than 0.5% sulfur content for all vessel fuel by 2020 and 2) Emission Control Areas for less than 1.0% sulfur content by 2010 and 0.1% by 2015.

Trailer Bridge implemented its own environmental protection award called Breath Easy. This award "calculates the percentage reduction in particulate matter emissions that can be associated with [customers'] shipments moving with Trailer Bridge's environmentally superior transport system."

== Clients ==
Many of Trailer Bridge's customers are blue chip companies. New cars and trucks are a major segment of their cargo, and vehicles are shipped for Ford, DaimlerChrysler and General Motors. Several major retail chains use Trailer Bridge to ship containers to their stores, including JC Penney, Home Depot, Costco and Toys 'R' Us. Costco was added as a customer in 2008. Other products are shipped to Puerto Rican distribution centers by major manufacturers Georgia-Pacific, General Electric, Procter & Gamble, Whirlpool and SC Johnson.
