= USNS Pollux =

Cargo ship of the United States Navy

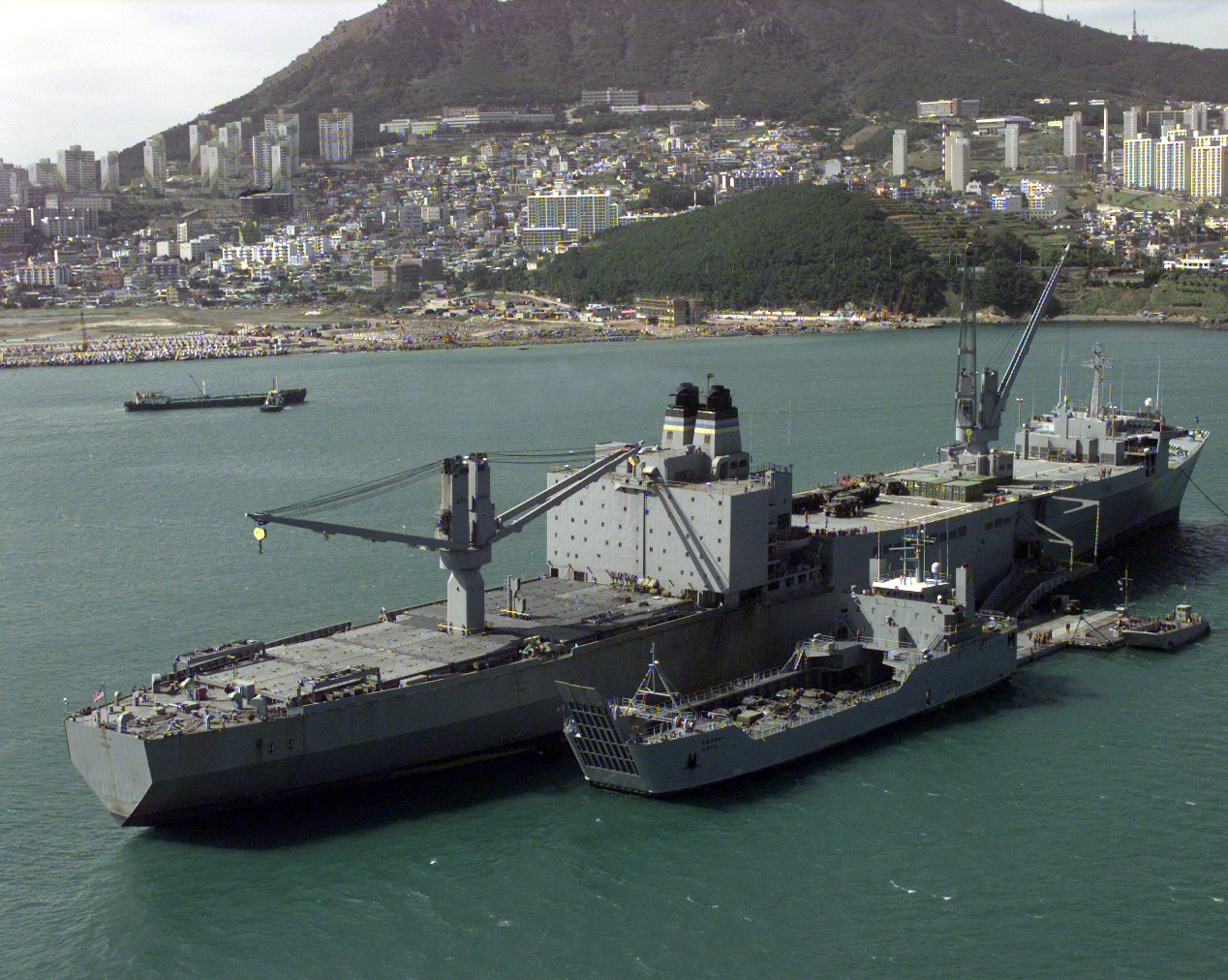
- USNS Pollux (T-AKR-290) in the port of Pusan, South Korea. Pollux is loading vehicles onto a United States Army Logistics Support Vessel (LSV) which will then transport them to shore.

History

United States
- Name: USNS Pollux
- Namesake: Pollux, the southern of two bright stars in the constellation Gemini, twin star of Castor
- Operator: United States Navy
- Builder: A.G. Weser
- Launched: 1 May 1973
- Completed: 1 September 1973 (delivered to Sea-Land as SS Sealand Market))
- Acquired: 16 November 1981
- In service: probably ca. 16 November 1981
- Out of service: probably ca. 28 July 1984
- In service: probably ca. 31 March 1986
- Out of service: 1 October 2007
- Identification: IMO number: 7319632; MMSI number: 368989000; Callsign: NMVG
- Honors and awards: National Defense Service Medal; Southwest Asia Service Medal; Kuwait Liberation Medal
- Status: Transferred to United States Maritime Administration 1 October 2007; Transferred to 5-day Ready Reserve 1 October 2008

General characteristics
- Class & type: Algol class vehicle cargo ship
- Displacement: 29692 tons (light); 55,355 tons (full)
- Length: 946 ft 2 in (288 m)
- Beam: 105 ft 6 in (32 m)
- Draft: 36 ft 4 in (11 m)
- Propulsion: Two Foster-Wheeler boilers, 875 psi (61.6kg/cm2); two General Electric MST-19 steam turbines; two shafts; 120,000 hp (89.5 MW)
- Speed: 33 knots
- Capacity: 700+ military vehicles (including trucks, tanks, and helicopters)
- Complement: 43 civilians, 12 military technicians (fully operational), 18 civilians (reduced operating status)
- Armament: None
- Aviation facilities: Landing pad

USNS Pollux (T-AK-290), later T-AKR-290, the fourth United States Navy ship of the name, is an Algol-class vehicle cargo ship that is currently maintained by the United States Maritime Administration as part of the Ready Reserve Force (RRF) as SS Pollux (T-AKR-290).

In keeping with the pattern of the naming the Algol-class ships after bright stars, the Pollux was named after Pollux, a star in the northern constellation of Gemini.

== Construction and early career ==
The ship was built as the high speed container ship SS Sea-Land Market, USCG ON 550721, IMO 7319632, by A.G. Weser in Bremen, West Germany, hull no. 1384, for Sea-Land Service, Inc. Launched on 1 May 1973, she was delivered to Sea-Land on 1 September 1973. Due to her high operating cost, she proved uneconomical for commercial use. Sea-Land sold her to the United States Navy on 16 November 1981.

The U.S. Navy classified the ship as a cargo ship (AK), assigned her to the Military Sealift Command for non-commissioned service, and renamed her USNS Pollux (T-AK-290). In September 1992, the Navy reclassified her as roll-on/roll-off vehicle cargo ship and redesignated her as T-AKR-290. On 1 October 2007, the United States Maritime Administration began operating all eight FSS. All eight were transferred to the Ready Reserve on 1 October 2008. At this time their USNS designations were replaced with SS designations as they were no longer US Navy ships.

== Conversion ==
Pollux's conversion into a vehicle cargo ship began on 28 July 1984 at Avondale Shipyards in New Orleans, Louisiana. Her cargo hold was redesigned into a series of decks connected by ramps so vehicles can be driven into and out of the cargo hold for fast loading and unloading. She was also fitted with two pairs of cranes, one pair amidships capable of lifting 35 long tons (36 t), and the other pair aft capable of lifting 50 long tons (51 t). When her conversion was complete, Avondale delivered her to the Military Sealift Command on 31 March 1986.

== Service ==
When not active, Pollux was kept in a reduced operating status due to her high operating cost, intinally a ROS-3 (96 hour) and later a ROS-5 (120 hour) activation readiness.

Pollux took part in the Persian Gulf War in 1990-1991. Along with the other seven Algol class vehicle cargo ships, she and her sisters transported 14 percent of all cargo transported between the United States and Saudi Arabia during and after the war.

== Transfer to Maritime Administration and Ready Reserve Force ==
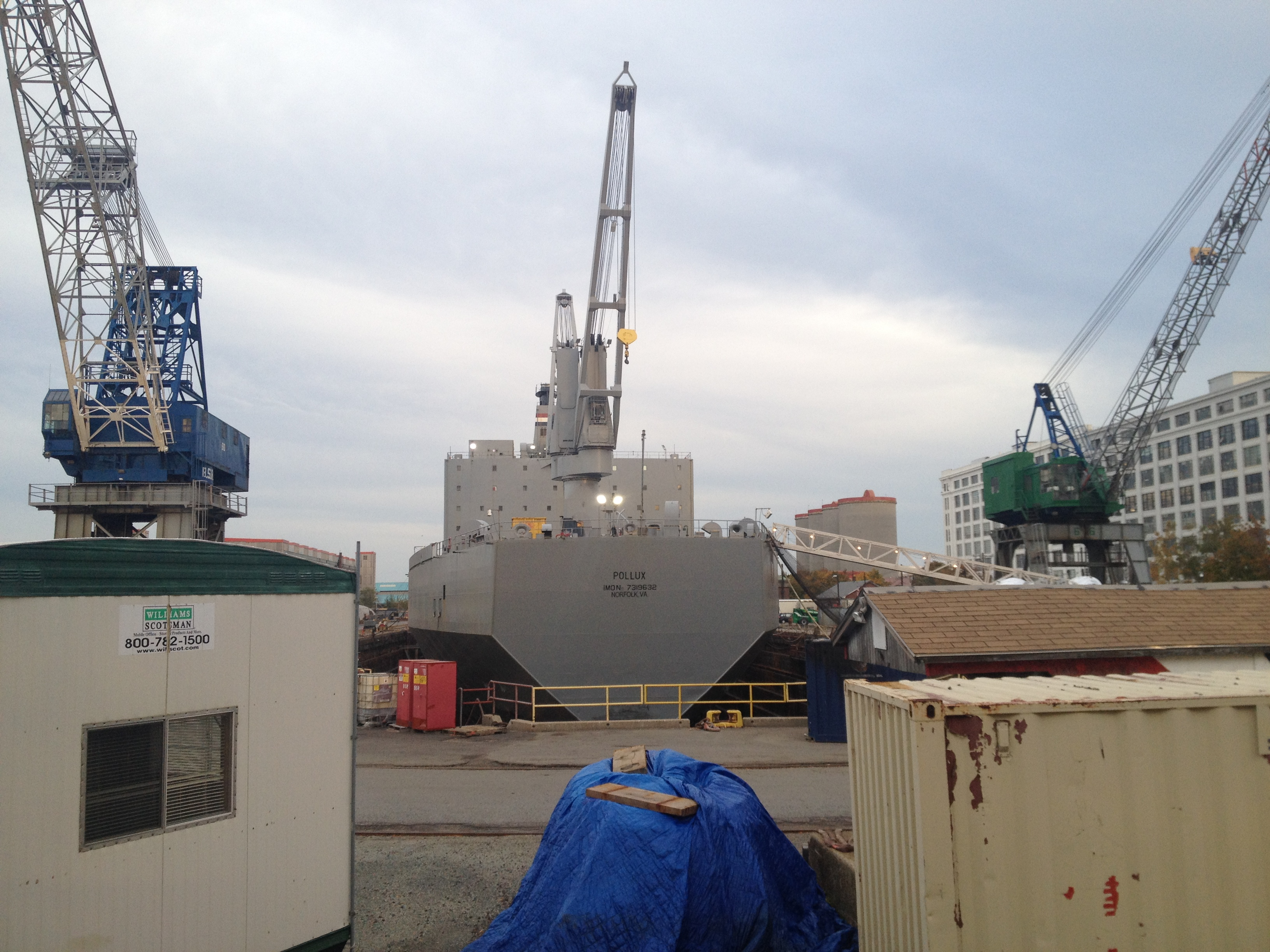
Pollux in Boston's Dry Dock Number 3 in October 2014

On 1 October 2007, Pollux was transferred to the United States Maritime Administration. On 1 October 2008, she was transferred to the Ready Reserve Force, losing her "USNS" designation, and laid up at Philadelphia, Pennsylvania. In 2014 the vessel and her sister SS Regulus were relocated to the United States Maritime Administration Beaumont Reserve Fleet where they remain in ROS-120 status. If activated again, Pollux will report to the Military Sealift Command, Atlantic Fleet.

In February of 2024, the United States Maritime Administration announced that the Pollux would be downgraded from the Ready Reserve Force in the 2nd Quarter of 2025 and is slated for scrap sale in the 4th Quarter of 2026.
