= Malcom McLean =

Transport entrepreneur who developed the modern intermodal shipping container

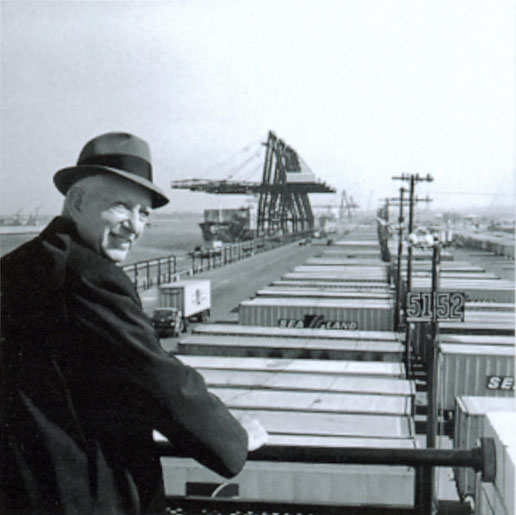
- McLean at railing, Port Newark, 1957
- Born: Malcolm Purcell McLean; November 14, 1913; Maxton, North Carolina, US
- Died: May 25, 2001 (aged 87); New York City, US
- Other name: "The Father of Containerization"
- Occupations: Inventor and Entrepreneur
- Years active: 1935-2001
- Known for: Pioneer of containerization; Founder of McLean Trucking Company; Founder of Sea-Land Service, Inc.; Founder of Trailer Bridge, Inc.; Financier of Diamondhead, Mississippi
- Spouses: Sarah McLean (m. 1959–1992) Irena McLean (m. 1993–2001)
- Children: 3 (with first wife)

Malcolm "Malcom" Purcell McLean (November 14, 1913 – May 25, 2001) was an American businessman who invented the modern intermodal shipping container, which revolutionized transport and international trade during the second half of the twentieth century. Containerization resulted in a major reduction of the cost of freight transportation by eliminating the need for repeated, labor-intensive handling of individual pieces of cargo, and also improved three-dimensional packing capability, reduced damage and cargo theft, and decreased inventory costs by shortening transit time. Containerization is a major enabler of globalization.

== Early life ==
McLean was born in Maxton, North Carolina in 1913. of Scottish heritage.. His first name was originally spelled Malcolm, though he used Malcom later in life.

In 1935, when he finished high school at Winston-Salem in North Carolina, his family did not have enough money to send him to college, but there was enough for McLean to buy a used truck.

The same year, McLean, his brother, Jim, and his sister, Clara, founded McLean Trucking Co. Based in Red Springs, North Carolina, McLean Trucking started hauling empty tobacco barrels, with McLean as one of the drivers.

== Containerization ==
The idea of transporting trucks on ships was implemented prior to World War II on a relatively small scale. In 1926, regular connection of the luxury passenger train from London to Paris, Golden Arrow/Fleche d'Or, by Southern Railway and French Northern Railway began. For transporting passengers' baggage, four containers were used. These containers were loaded in London or Paris and carried to ports, Dover or Calais, on flat cars in the UK and “CIWL Pullman Golden Arrow Fourgon of CIWL” in France.

During the early 1950s, McLean decided to use the containers for general commercial goods. By 1952, he was developing plans to carry his company's trucks on ships along the U.S. Atlantic coast, from North Carolina to New York. It soon became apparent that "trailerships", as they were called, would be inefficient because of the large waste of potential cargo space aboard the vessel, known as broken stowage. The original concept was modified into loading just the containers, not the chassis, onto the ships, hence the designation container ship or "box" ship. At the time, U.S. regulations would not allow a trucking company to own a shipping line.

McLean secured a bank loan for $22 million and, in January 1956, bought two World War II T-2 tanker ships, which he converted to carry containers on and under deck. McLean oversaw the construction of wooden shelter decks, known as Mechano decking. This was a common practice in World War II for the carriage of oversized cargo, such as aircraft. It took several months to refit the ships, construct containers to carry on and below the vessels' decks, and design trailer chassis to allow removable containers.

On April 26, 1956, with 100 invited dignitaries present, one of the converted tankers, the SS Ideal-X (informally dubbed the "SS Maxton" after McLean's hometown in North Carolina), was loaded and sailed from the Port Newark-Elizabeth Marine Terminal, New Jersey, for the Port of Houston, Texas, carrying 58 35-foot (11 m) Trailer Vans, later termed containers, along with a regular load of liquid tank cargo. As the Ideal-X left the Port of Newark, Freddy Fields, a major official of the International Longshoremen's Association, was asked what he thought of the newly fitted container ship. Fields replied, "I'd like to sink that son of a bitch". McLean flew to Houston to be there when the ship docked, which it did safely.

At that time, most cargoes were loaded and unloaded by hand by longshore workers. Hand-loading a ship cost $5.86 a ton at that time. Using containers, it cost only 16 cents a ton to load a ship, a 36-fold savings. Containerization also greatly reduced the time to load and unload ships. McLean knew that a ship earns money only when at sea, and based his business on that efficiency.

In April 1957, the first container ship, the Gateway City, began regular service between New York, Florida, and Texas. During the summer of 1958 McLean Industries, still using the name Pan-Atlantic Steamship Corporation, inaugurated container service between the U.S. mainland and San Juan, Puerto Rico with the vessel Fairland. The name was changed officially from Pan-Atlantic Steamship Corporation to Sea-Land Service, Inc. in April 1960. McLean's operation was profitable by 1961 and he kept adding routes and buying bigger ships.

In August 1963, McLean opened a new 101-acre (0.41 km^{2}) port facility in Port Newark-Elizabeth Marine Terminal to handle even more container traffic. The development of the container market was slow until the late 1960s. Many ports did not have the cranes to lift containers on and off ships, and change was slow in an industry steeped in tradition. Moreover, unions resisted an idea that threatened their livelihood.

In April 1966, Sea-Land commenced service between New York and Rotterdam, Netherlands; Bremen, Germany; and Grangemouth, Scotland.

In 1967, Sea-Land was invited by the U.S. government to start a container service to South Vietnam. The service to Vietnam produced 40% of the company's revenue in 1968/69.

In late 1968, commercial container ship service was inaugurated from the Far East to the United States. This service was expanded to Hong Kong and Taiwan in 1969, and to Singapore, Thailand and the Philippines in 1971.

To achieve reductions in labor and dock servicing time, McLean followed Roy Fruehauf's lead and became vigilant about standardization. His efforts to increase efficiency resulted in standardized container designs that were awarded patent protection. McLean made his patents available by issuing a royalty-free lease to the International Organization for Standardization.

By the end of the 1960s, Sea-Land Industries had 27,000 trailer-type containers, manufactured by Fruehauf Trailer Corporation, 36 trailer ships and access to more than 30 port cities.

As the advantages to McLean's container system became apparent, competitors quickly adapted. They built bigger ships, larger gantry cranes and more sophisticated containers. Sea-Land needed cash to stay competitive. McLean turned to R. J. Reynolds Tobacco Company, a company he knew from his trucking company days when his trucks transported Reynolds cigarettes across the United States. In January 1969, Reynolds agreed to buy Sea-Land for $530 million in cash and stock. McLean made $160 million personally, and got a seat on the company's board. To perform the purchase, Reynolds formed a holding company, named R.J. Reynolds Industries, Inc., which bought Sea-Land in May 1969. That same year, Sea-Land ordered five of the largest, fastest container ships in the world - SL-7 class vessels.

Owned by Reynolds, Sea-Land's profits were intermittent. By the end of 1974, Reynolds had invested more than $1 billion into Sea-Land, building huge terminals in New Jersey and Hong Kong and adding to its fleet of container ships.

Sea-Land's biggest expense was fuel, so in 1970, RJR bought the American Independent Oil Co., better known as Aminoil, for $56 million. RJR invested million of dollars into oil exploration, trying to get Aminoil large enough to compete in the world exploration market.

In 1974, R.J. Reynolds Industries had its best year. Sea-Land's earnings increased nearly 10 times, to $145 million. Aminoil's earnings soared to $86.3 million. Dun & Bradstreet, the financial-ratings company, named RJR one of its five best-managed companies in America. But in 1975, Sea-Land's earnings decreased sharply, along with Aminoil's. McLean relinquished his Reynolds board seat in 1977 and ended his relationship with the company.

In June 1984, R.J. Reynolds Industries, Inc. divested Sea-Land Corporation to shareholders, as an independent, publicly held company, with stock trading on the New York Stock Exchange. Sea-Land achieved the greatest revenues and earnings in its 28-year history.

In September 1986, Sea-Land Corporation merged with CSA Acquisition Corp., a subsidiary of CSX Corporation. Sea-Land Corporation common stock was exchanged for $28 per share, cash.

Sea-Land's international services were sold to Maersk in 1999, and the combined company was named Maersk Sealand, which, in 2006, became known simply as Maersk Line.

The former Sea-Land's domestic services was operated until 2015 as Horizon Lines, which accounted for approximately 36% of the total U.S. marine container shipments between the continental U.S. and the markets of Alaska, Hawaii and Puerto Rico, and to Guam. The company was headquartered in Charlotte, North Carolina. In 2015 the company was acquired by Matson Navigation Company.

== Subsequent business ventures ==
In 1968 McLean financed a real estate project in Waveland, Mississippi that has become Diamondhead, Mississippi.

In 1971, the Pinehurst Resort property in Pinehurst, North Carolina was sold to Diamondhead Corporation, a land development company headquartered in Mountainside, New Jersey, and owned by McLean. The venerable old resort had seen virtually no noticeable changes in 75 years before its sale became the object of controversy. Finally, in 1982, Pinehurst became the property of Diamondhead's major lenders, who formed a NC corporation named Resort Assets Corporation. With their takeover, a more viable effort was then made to work in concert with Pinehurst village officials to restore the overall community.

In 1978, McLean purchased United States Lines. There, he built a fleet of 4,400-Twenty-foot Equivalent Unit (TEU) container ships that were the largest afloat at the time. The ships, operating in round-the-world service, were designed after the 1970s oil shortages and were fuel-efficient but slow, and therefore not well-adapted to compete in the subsequent period of cheap oil. USL went bankrupt in 1986. McLean took very personally the criticism directed against him after the collapse of USL and the resulting loss of many jobs associated with and dependent on USL.

In 1982, McLean made the Forbes 400 Richest Americans list with a net worth of $400 million, however, a few years later, having gambled on increasing oil prices that failed to happen, McLean had to file for Chapter 11 bankruptcy owing debt of $1.3 billion.

In 1991, at 78, McLean founded Trailer Bridge, Inc., which operates between the US mainland (Jacksonville, Florida), Puerto Rico and the Dominican Republic.

McLean also developed non-maritime inventions, including a means of lifting a patient from a stretcher onto a hospital bed.

== Death ==
McLean died at his home in New York City on May 25, 2001, age 87, of heart failure. His death prompted Norman Y. Mineta to make the following statement:

Malcom revolutionized the maritime industry in the 20th century. His idea for modernizing the loading and unloading of ships, which was previously conducted in much the same way the ancient Phoenicians did 3,000 years ago, has resulted in much safer and less-expensive transport of goods, faster delivery, and better service. We owe so much to a man of vision, "the father of containerization," Malcolm P. McLean.

In an editorial soon after his death, Baltimore Sun stated that "he ranks next to Robert Fulton as the greatest revolutionary in the history of maritime trade." Forbes Magazine termed McLean "one of the few men who changed the world."

On the morning of McLean's funeral, container ships around the world blew their whistles in his honor.

== Honors ==
Fortune inducted McLean into its Business Hall of Fame in 1982. In 1995, American Heritage named him one of the ten outstanding innovators of the past 40 years. In 2000, he was named Man of the Century by the International Maritime Hall of Fame.

McLean was inducted into the Junior Achievement U.S. Business Hall of Fame in 1982.

In 2000, McLean received an honorary degree from the U.S. Merchant Marine Academy.

McLean is the only person to found three companies that were later listed on the New York Stock Exchange (plus two others on the NASDAQ).

Trailer Bridge, Inc., which McLean founded in 1992, annually awards the Malcom P. McLean Innovative Spirit Award. The annual McLean Award recognizes an outstanding graduating student at George Mason University, selected by professors.

McLean was inducted into the North Carolina Transportation Hall of Fame in 2006.

== Notes and references ==
Footnotes

References

- Marc Levinson. (2016, 2nd ed.). - The Box: How the Shipping Container Made the World Smaller and the World Economy Bigger. - Princeton, New Jersey: Princeton University Press.
- Marc Levinson. (2020). Outside the Box: How Globalization Changed from Moving Stuff to Spreading Ideas. Princeton University Press.
- Brian J. Cudahy. (2006). - Box Boats: How Container Ships Changed the World. - Fordham University Press
- Frank Broeze. (2002). - "The Globalization of the Oceans: Containerization from the 1950s to the Present". - International Maritime Economic History Association.
- The Container Revolution at sname.org
