= SS Algol =

American cargo ship

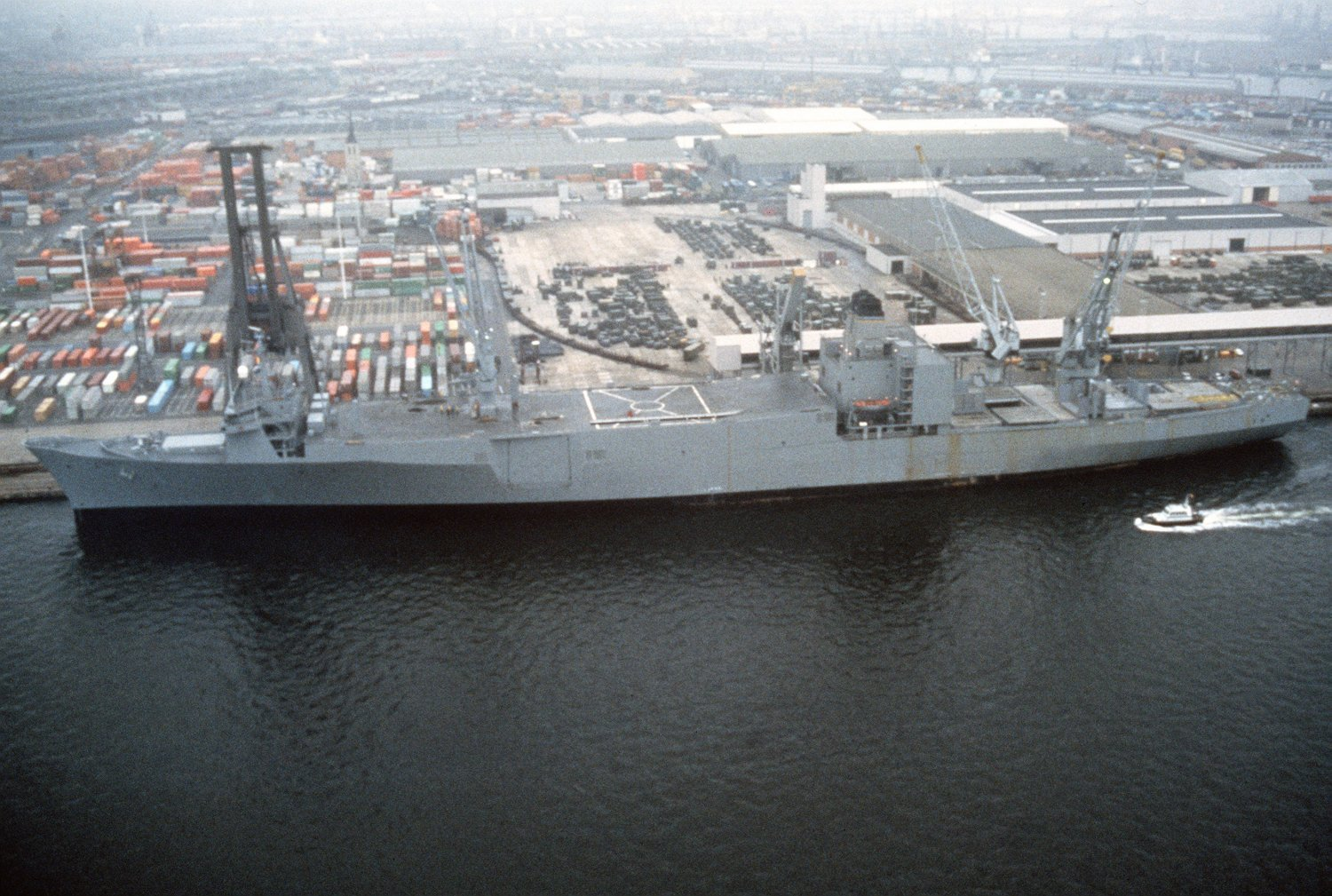
- USNS Algol (T-AKR-287) in Antwerp, Belgium.

History

United States
- Name: Sea-Land Exchange (1973-81) Algol (1981-Present)
- Namesake: Algol
- Owner: SeaLand (1973-81) United States Maritime Administration (1981-Present)
- Operator: SeaLand (1973-81) USN (1981-Present)
- Builder: Rotterdamsche Droogdok Maatschappij N.V
- Laid down: 1 November 1971
- Launched: 1 September 1972
- Acquired: October 1981
- Identification: IMO number: 7303205; MMSI number: 368992000; Callsign: NAMW
- Honors and awards: National Defense Service Medal; Southwest Asia Service Medal; Kuwait Liberation Medal
- Status: Disposal

General characteristics
- Class & type: Algol-class vehicle cargo ship
- Displacement: 55,355 tons (full)
- Length: 946 ft 2 in (288 m)
- Beam: 105 ft 6 in (32 m)
- Draft: 36 ft 7 in (11 m)
- Propulsion: 2 × Foster-Wheeler boilers, 875 psi (61.6 kg/cm2); 2 × GE MST-19 steam turbines; 120,000 hp (89.5 MW)
- Speed: 33 knots (61 km/h; 38 mph)
- Capacity: 700+ military vehicles (including trucks, tanks, and helicopters)
- Crew: 43 civilians, 12 military technicians (fully operational), 18 civilians (reduced operating status)
- Aviation facilities: Landing pad

SS Algol (T-AKR 287) is an Algol-class vehicle cargo ship that is currently maintained by the United States Maritime Administration as part of the Military Sealift Command's Ready Reserve Force. She was built as a high speed container ship by Rotterdamsche Droogdok Maatschappij N.V. in Rotterdam, the Netherlands, hull no. 331, for Sea-Land Service, Inc. and named SS Sea-Land Exchange, USCG ON 546383, IMO 7303205. As the first of her class in service, her owners were eager to showcase her abilities and so ordered that in August of 1973 the vessel would attempt to best the record-setting Atlantic Ocean crossing time of the SS United States which earned her the Blue Riband to showcase the capabilities of the new class of cargo vessels. Though ineligible to take the title as she was not a passenger vessel, the Sea-Land Exchange nevertheless completed her Eastbound crossing at an average of 34.97 knots (64.76 km/h; 40.24 mph), only 1 knot slower than the SS United States. The vessel is still the Guinness Book of World Records holder for fastest Eastbound Atlantic Crossing by a cargo ship.

Due to her high operating cost, Sea-Land Exchange was sold to the United States Navy in October 1981 as USNS Algol (T-AK-287).

In keeping with the pattern of the naming the Algol-class ships after bright stars, Algol was named after the bright eclipsing binary star Algol, known colloquially as the Demon Star, which is a bright star in the constellation Perseus.

== Conversion ==
Conversion began on 13 October 1982 at National Steel and Shipbuilding in San Diego, California. Her cargo hold was redesigned into a series of decks connected by ramps so vehicles can be driven into and out of the cargo hold for fast loading and unloading. She was also fitted with two sets of two cranes; one set located at midship capable of lifting 35 tons, and another set located aft capable of lifting 50 tons. She was delivered to the Military Sealift Command in 1984 as USNS Algol (T-AKR 287).

== Service ==
When not active, Algol is kept in reduced operating status due to her high operating cost, initially a ROS-3 (96 hour) and later a ROS-5 (120 hour) activation readiness. In 1984, Algol was the first Fast Sealift Ship to take part in a European exercise when she took part in the NATO exercise, Operation REFORGER. Algol took part in the Persian Gulf War in 1990. Along with the other seven Algol-class cargo ships, she transported 14 percent of all cargo delivered between the United States and Saudi Arabia during and after the war. In October 1998, Algol was activated to carry disaster relief supplies and equipment to Puerto Rico and other nearby islands following the aftermath of Hurricane Georges. In early 2003, Algol was activated to take part in Operation Iraqi Freedom.

On 1 October 2007, Algol was transferred to the United States Maritime Administration. On 1 October 2008, Algol was transferred to the Ready Reserve Force at Ready Reserve Fleet Alameda, losing her USNS designation.

If activated, SS Algol will report to the Military Sealift Command. Atlantic Fleet.

In June 2024 the Algol departed her long-time layberth in San Francisco for the United States Maritime Administration Beaumont Reserve Fleet, arriving in July. The vessel remains in ROS-5 (120 hour) activation readiness at her new homeport.
