= SS Regulus (T-AKR-292) =

US Navy Algol class cargo ship launched 1973

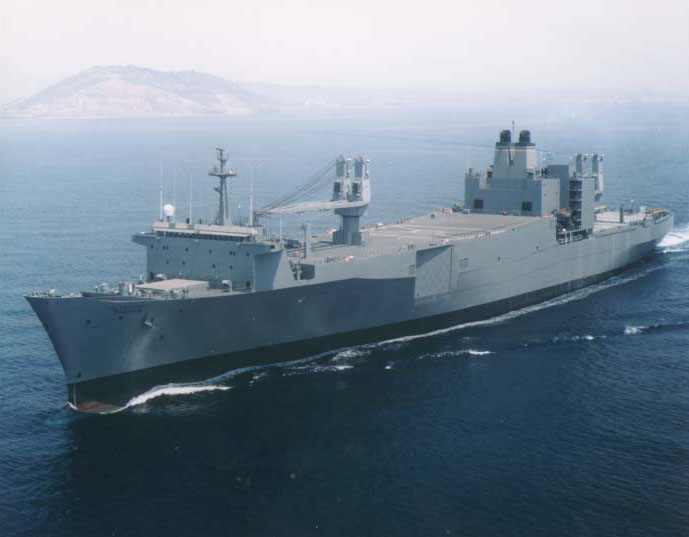
- USNS Regulus (T-AKR-292) offloading a US Marine Logistic Vehicle System (LVS) at Auckland Port, Gladstone, Australia, during exercise Crocodile '99.

History

United States
- Namesake: Regulus
- Operator: United States Navy
- Builder: A.G. Weser
- Launched: 1 December 1973
- Acquired: 27 October 1981
- Identification: IMO number: 7302897; MMSI number: 366987000; Callsign: NLWA
- Honors and awards: National Defense Service Medal; Southwest Asia Service Medal; Kuwait Liberation Medal
- Status: Ready Reserve

General characteristics
- Class & type: Algol class vehicle cargo ship
- Displacement: 55,355 tons (full)
- Length: 946 ft 2 in (288 m)
- Beam: 105 ft 6 in (32 m)
- Draft: 36 ft 4 in (11 m)
- Propulsion: 2 × Foster-Wheeler boilers, 875 psi (61.6kg/cm2); 2 × GE MST-19 steam turbines; 120,000 hp (89.5 MW)
- Speed: 33 knots
- Capacity: 700+ military vehicles (including trucks, tanks, and helicopters)
- Complement: 43 civilians, 12 military technicians (fully operational), 8 civilians (reduced operating status)
- Armament: None
- Aviation facilities: Landing pad

SS Regulus (T-AKR 292) is an Algol class vehicle cargo ship that is currently maintained by the United States Maritime Administration as part of the Military Sealift Command's Ready Reserve Force (RRF). She was built as a high-speed container ship by A.G. Weser in Bremen, West Germany, hull no. 1383, for Sea-Land Service, Inc. and named SS Sea-Land Commerce, USCG 545200, IMO 7302897. As the first of her class in service in Pacific Ocean trades, her owners were eager to showcase her abilities and so ordered that in June and August of 1973 the vessel would attempt to set a new record for cargo ships crossing the Pacific Ocean. Clearing Race Rocks Light and arriving at Osaka, Japan in 5 days 23 hours and 30 minutes at an average speed of 30.32 knots, she claimed the Westbound record, only to reload and head back East in August. Clearing Yokohama, Japan and arriving at Long Beach, California 6 days 1hr 27 mins later at an average speed of 33.27 knots, the ship claimed the still-undisputed records for [Pacific Ocean] crossings.

Due to her high operating cost, she was sold to the United States Navy on 27 October 1981 as USNS Regulus (T-AK-292).

In keeping with the pattern of naming the Algol-class ships after bright stars, the Regulus was named after Regulus, the brightest star in the constellation Leo and one of the brightest stars in the night sky.

== Conversion ==
Conversion began on 29 June 1984 at National Steel and Shipbuilding in San Diego, California. Her cargo hold was redesigned into a series of decks connected by ramps so vehicles could be driven into and out of the cargo hold for fast loading and unloading. She was also fitted with two sets of two cranes; one set located at midship capable of lifting 35 tons, and another set located aft capable of lifting 50 tons. She was delivered to the Military Sealift Command on 28 August 1985 as USNS Regulus (T-AKR 292).

== Service ==
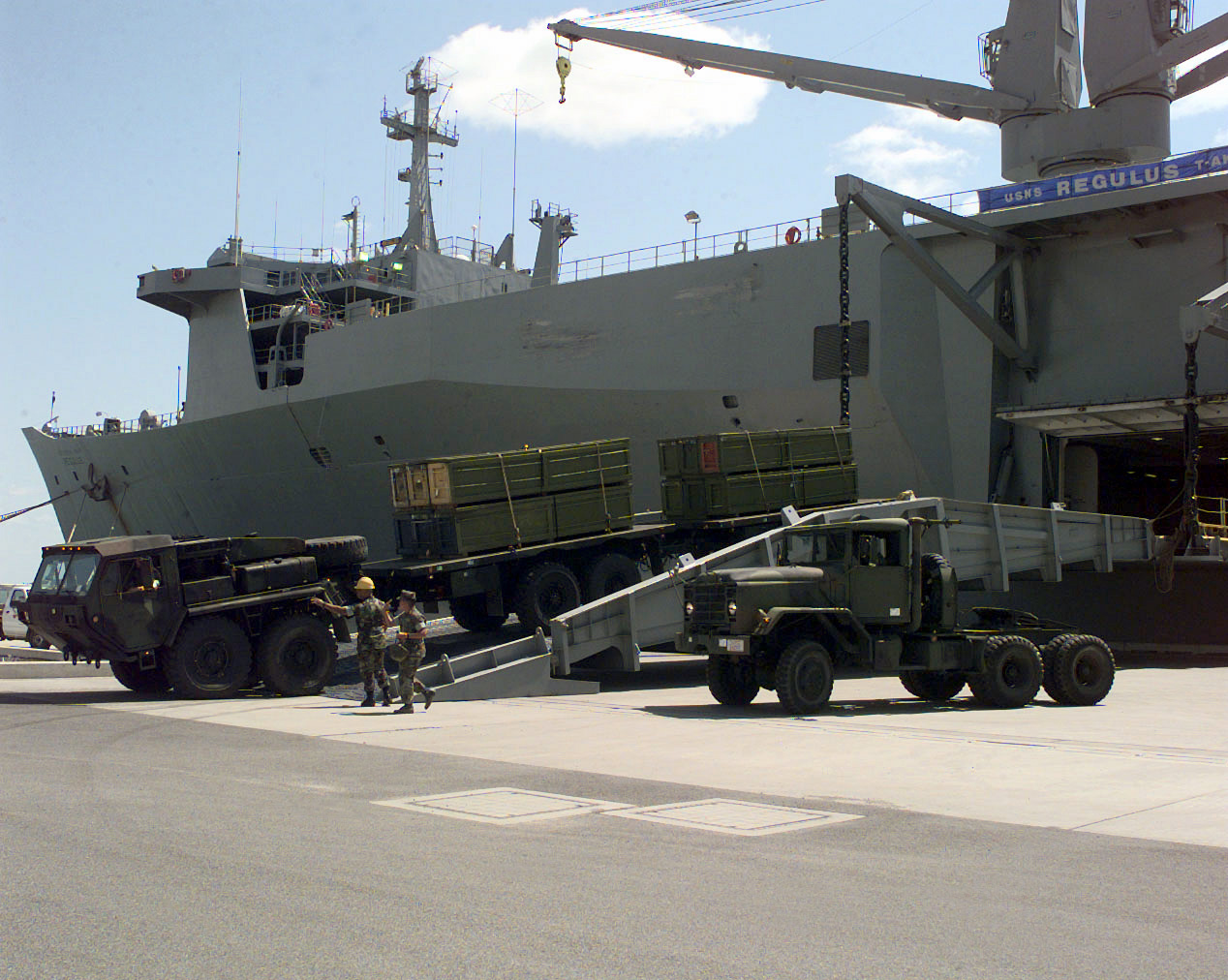
USNS Regulus in port

When not active, Regulus is kept in reduced operating status due to her high operating cost. If needed, she can be activated and ready to sail in 96 hours. Regulus took part in the Persian Gulf War in 1990. Along with the other seven Algol class cargo ships, she transported 14 percent of all cargo delivered between the United States and Saudi Arabia during and after the war.

On 1 October 2007, Regulus was transferred to the United States Maritime Administration. On 1 October 2008, she was transferred to the Ready Reserve Force, losing her USNS designation. In 2014 the vessel and her sister SS Pollux were relocated to the United States Maritime Administration Beaumont Reserve Fleet where they remain in ROS-120 status. If activated again, Regulus will report to the Military Sealift Command, Atlantic Fleet.
