= SS Antares =

US Navy Algol class cargo ship launched 1972

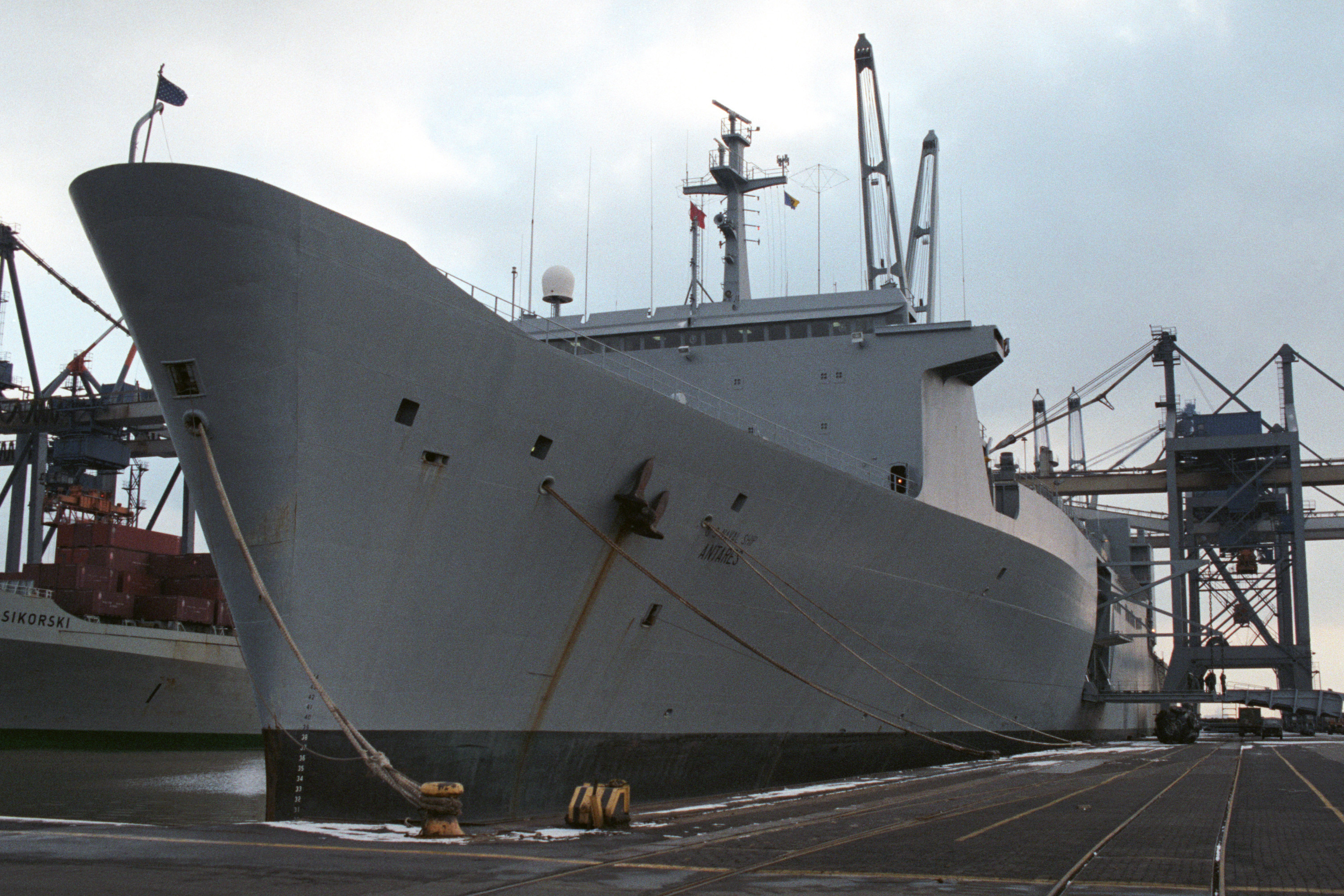
- USNS Antares (T-AKR-294) taking on vehicles and equipment in Bremerhaven, Germany, during Operation Reforger '86.

History

United States
- Namesake: Antares
- Operator: United States Navy
- Awarded: 1 August 1969
- Builder: A.G. Weser, Bremen
- Launched: 1 May 1972
- Acquired: 16 April 1982
- Identification: IMO number: 7226897; MMSI number: 367185000; Callsign: NPEJ
- Honors and awards: National Defense Service Medal
- Status: Ready Reserve

General characteristics
- Class & type: Algol class vehicle cargo ship
- Displacement: 55,355 tons (full)
- Length: 946 ft 2 in (288 m)
- Beam: 105 ft 6 in (32 m)
- Draft: 36 ft 4 in (11 m)
- Propulsion: 2 × Foster-Wheeler boilers, 875 psi (61.6 kg/cm^{2}); 2 × GE MST-19 steam turbines; 120,000 hp (89.5 MW)
- Speed: 33 knots
- Capacity: 700+ military vehicles (including trucks, tanks, and helicopters)
- Complement: 43 civilians, 12 military technicians (fully operational), 18 civilians (reduced operating status)
- Aviation facilities: Landing pad

SS Antares (T-AKR 294) is an Algol class vehicle cargo ship that is currently maintained by the United States Maritime Administration as part of the Military Sealift Command's Ready Reserve Force (RRF). She was built as a high speed container ship by A.G. Weser in Bremen, West Germany, hull no. 1382, for Sea-Land Service, Inc. Baptized in Bremerhaven by Helga Wedekind, the ship was named SS Sea-Land Galloway, USCG ON 542200, IMO 7226897. Due to her high operating cost, she was sold to the United States Navy on 16 April 1982 as USNS Antares (T-AK-294).

In keeping with the pattern of the naming the Algol-class ships after bright stars, the Antares was named after Antares, the brightest star in the constellation Scorpius.

== Conversion ==
Conversion began on 6 October 1982 at Avondale Shipyards in New Orleans, Louisiana. Her cargo hold was redesigned into a series of decks connected by ramps so vehicles can be driven into and out of the cargo hold for fast loading and unloading. She was also fitted with two sets of two cranes; one set located at midship capable of lifting 35 tons, and another set located aft capable of lifting 50 tons. She was delivered to the Military Sealift Command on 12 July 1984 as USNS Antares (T-AKR 294).

== Service ==
When not active, Antares is kept in reduced operating status due to her high operating cost. If needed, she was initially kept in ROS-3 activation status, meaning she can be activated and ready to sail in 96 hours. Antares took part in the Persian Gulf War in 1990. Along with the other seven Algol class cargo ships, she transported 14 percent of all cargo delivered between the United States and Saudi Arabia during and after the war, despite a major propulsion casualty that kept her under repair for multiple weeks. In 1994, she was activated to carry supplies to Guantanamo Bay, Cuba where Haitian and Cuban refugees were given safe haven by US forces. She was activated in February 1999, and carried U.S. Army cargo to Rijeka, Croatia in support of the NATO peacekeeping mission Operation Joint Guard. In 2004 she was used in support of Operation Iraqi Freedom for the transportation of military equipment between Kuwait and the United States. She carried the equipment for the entire 2D Armored Cavalry Regiment home at the completion of their mission.

On 1 October 2007, Antares was transferred to the United States Maritime Administration. On 1 October 2008, she was transferred to the Ready Reserve Force, losing her USNS designation. The vessel was kept in ROS-5 activation status, ensuring readiness to sail in 120 hours following her transfer to the United States Maritime Administration. If activated, Antares will report to the Military Sealift Command. Atlantic Fleet.

Together with sistership SS Denebola (T-AKR-289), Antares resided in Baltimore harbor until July of 2024 when she relocated to the United States Maritime Administration Beaumont Reserve Fleet. Shortly after her arrival, the United States Maritime Administration announced that the Antares would be downgraded from the Ready Reserve Force in the 4th Quarter of 2025 and will be sold for scrapping in the 2nd Quarter of 2026.
