= Algol-class vehicle cargo ship =

Ship class

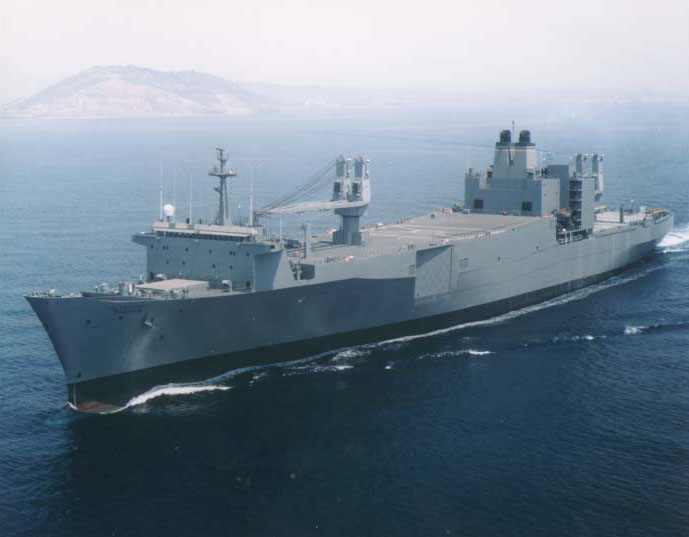
- USNS Regulus

Class overview
- Builders: T-AKR 287, 288, 289, 293; Rotterdamsche D.D.Mij N.V., Rotterdam, the Netherlands; T-AKR 291; Rheinstahl Nordseewerke, Emden, West Germany; T-AKR 290, 292, 294; AG Weser, Bremen, Germany
- Built: 1972–73
- Active: 8

General characteristics
- Displacement: 55,350 tons
- Length: 946.2 ft (288.4 m)
- Beam: 106 ft (32 m)
- Draft: 37 ft (11 m)
- Propulsion: 2 Foster-Wheeler boilers, 875 psi (61.6 kg/cm2); 2 GE MST-19 steam turbines; 120,000 hp (89.5 MW); 2 shafts
- Speed: 33 knots (61 km/h; 38 mph)
- Complement: 43 civilians, 12 military technicians (fully operational), 18 civilians (reduced operating status)

The Algol-class vehicle cargo ships, also known as Fast Sealift Ships (FSS) or SL-7s, are currently the fastest conventional steam powered cargo ships in the world that are still (intermittently) operating, capable of speeds in excess of 33 knots (61 km/h). Originally built in 1972 and 1973 as high-speed container ships known as SL-7s for SeaLand, the ships' high operating costs limited their profitability. All eight ships were acquired by the United States Navy in 1981 and 1982, with the last ship converted, delivered to and placed in service with Military Sealift Command in 1986. The conversion entailed the installation of four cranes, addition of roll on/roll off capability and a redesign of the cargo hold to better facilitate storage of vehicles. All ships are named after bright stars in the night sky.

Due largely to their high cost of operation, all fast sealift ships were kept in Reduced Operating Status while in MSC Custody, initially in ROS-3 (96 hour) and later ROS-5 (120 hour) activation readiness status.

== Service ==
All eight ships took part in Operations Desert Shield and Desert Storm, delivering thirteen percent of all the cargo transported between the United States and Saudi Arabia during and after the Persian Gulf War. Fast sealift ships have taken part in Operations Restore Hope, Joint Guardian, Enduring Freedom and Iraqi Freedom in addition to humanitarian relief efforts across the globe. On 1 October 2007, the United States Maritime Administration began operating all eight FSS. All eight were transferred to the Ready Reserve on 1 October 2008. At this time their USNS designations were replaced with SS designations as they were no longer US Navy ships.

Commencing in February 2024, the Maritime Administration began to consolidate the Algol Class to the Beaumont Reserve Fleet in Beaumont, TX from their previous homeports in preparation for their removal from the Ready Reserve Fleet. Shortly thereafter the agency began announcing the planned deactivation and scrap sale dates for select vessels as they phase out of active reserve service.

== Antares propulsion failure ==
Before Operation Desert Storm an engine failed. From GlobalSecurity.org:

Unfortunately, one FSS, the Antares, failed off the East coast of the United States with a considerable amount of the 24th Infantry Division (Mechanized) equipment and 100 soldiers aboard. The ship was towed to Rota, Spain by the ocean-going tugboat Apache. Some of the cargo was airlifted to Saudi Arabia but most had to be unloaded and reloaded by the soldiers and Seabees aboard the FSS USNS Altaire returning from her initial voyage. This cargo arrived about three weeks later than planned. (Before the war, the Antares had been scheduled for major overhaul, but this was delayed. Thus a degree of risk was accepted in the decision to use Antares to speed the deployment.)

== Fast Sealift Ships ==
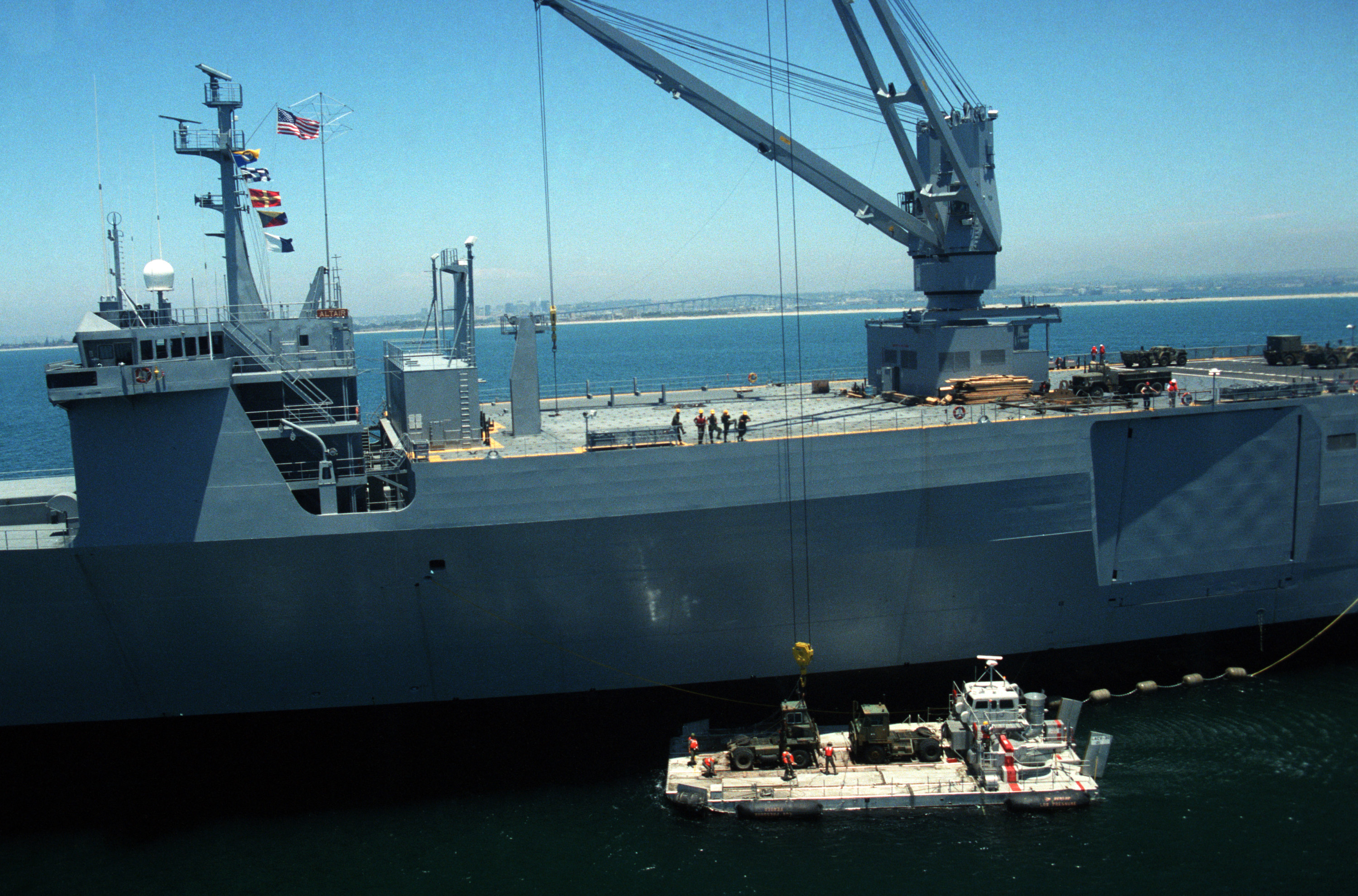
Cranes aboard the vehicle cargo ship USNS ALTAIR (T-AKR 291) lower equipment to an LACV-30 air cushion vehicle during Exercise GALLANT EAGLE 86

- SS Algol (T-AKR-287) (formerly SS Sea-Land Exchange)
- SS Bellatrix (T-AKR-288) (formerly SS Sea-Land Trade) Transferred to Brownsville, Texas for scrapping October 2025
- SS Denebola (T-AKR-289) (formerly SS Sea-Land Resource)
- SS Pollux (T-AKR-290) (formerly SS Sea-Land Market) - Planned deactivation 4th Quarter of 2025, Scrap Sale 2nd Quarter of 2026.
- SS Altair (T-AKR-291) (formerly SS Sea-Land Finance) Transferred to Brownsville, Texas for scrapping October 2025
- SS Regulus (T-AKR-292) (formerly SS Sea-Land Commerce)
- SS Capella (T-AKR-293) (formerly SS Sea-Land McLean)
- SS Antares (T-AKR-294) (formerly SS Sea-Land Galloway) - Planned deactivation 4th Quarter of 2025, Scrap Sale 2nd Quarter of 2026.

Name	hull#	Builder	original name	Launched	Acquired	IMO #:	MMSI #:	callsign
Algol	T-AKR-287	Rotterdamsche D.D.Mij N.V	SS Sea-Land Exchange	1-Sep-72	Oct-81	7303205	368992000	NAMW
Bellatrix	T-AKR-288	Rotterdamsche D.D.Mij N.V	SS Sea-Land Trade	1-Feb-73	13-Oct-81	7236153	368991000	NHLL
Denebola	T-AKR-289	Rotterdamsche D.D.Mij N.V	SS Sea-Land Resource	1-Nov-73	27-Oct-81	7325253	367190000	NDSP
Pollux	T-AKR-290	A.G. Weser	SS Sea-Land Market	1-May-73	16-Nov-81	7319632	368989000	NMVG
Altair	T-AKR-291	Rheinstahl Nordseewerke	SS Sea-Land Finance	1-Apr-73	5-Jan-82	7315571	368988000	NRZA
Regulus	T-AKR-292	A.G. Weser	SS Sea-Land Commerce	1-Dec-73	27-Oct-81	7302897	366987000	NLWA
Capella	T-AKR-293	Rotterdamsche D.D.Mij N.V.	SS Sea-Land McLean	1-Sep-72	16-Apr-82	7223508	367186000	NBXO
Antares	T-AKR-294	A.G. Weser, Bremen	SS Sea-Land Galloway	1-May-72	16-Apr-82	7226897	367185000	NPEJ
