= MV Baltic Enterprise =

Ship built in 1973

MV Baltic Enterprise was a RO-RO ship built at the Rauma Repola shipyard, Finland for the United Baltic Corporation. She was launched on 6 March and completed in June 1973. Baltic Enterprise had a deadweight tonnage of 5710 tons and measured 137.5 metres long with a beam of 22.4 metres. In 1983 the vessel was sold and renamed Lipa. She was scrapped at Alang on 31 July 2008.
