= Gutian railway station =

Railway station in Ningde, Fujian

Gutian 古田
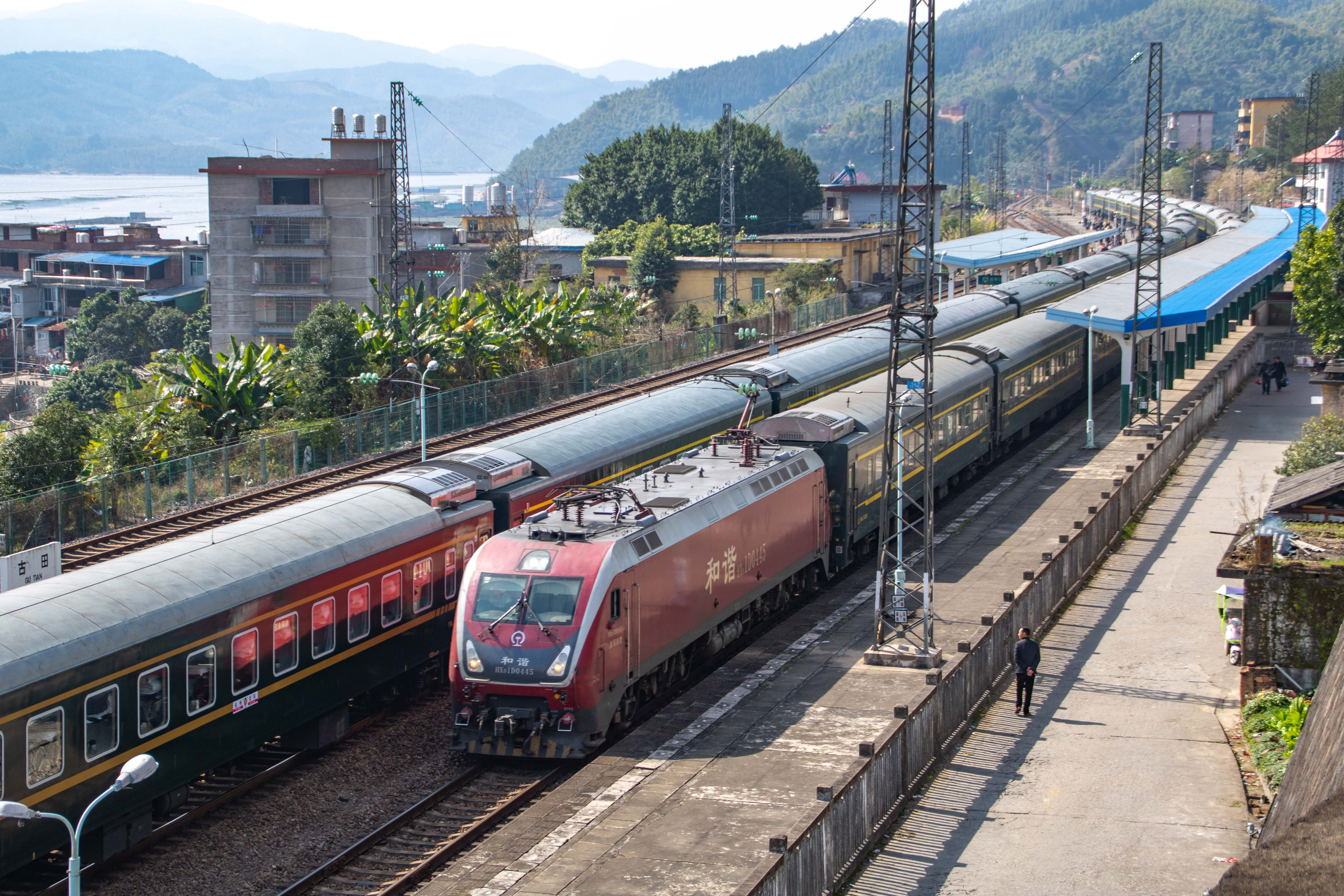
- Two trains passing at Gutian railway station

General information
- Location: Gutian County, Ningde, Fujian; China
- Line: Nanping–Fuzhou railway

History
- Closed: 2020
Location

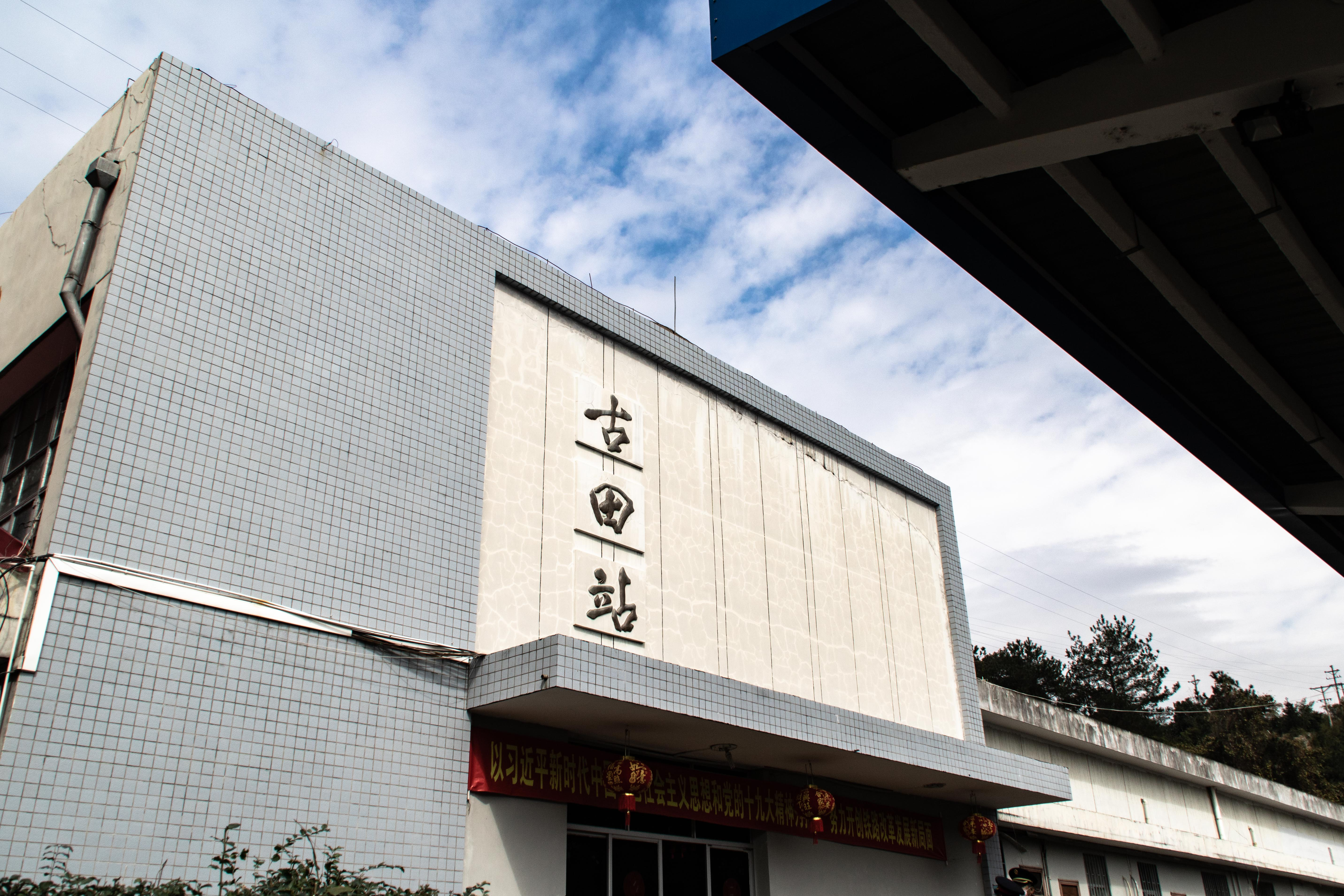

Gutian railway station (Chinese: 古田站) is a railway station in Gutian County, Ningde, Fujian, China. It is an intermediate stop on the Nanping–Fuzhou railway.

== History ==
Passenger transportation ended in April 2020.
