= Gǔ (surname 古) =

Gǔ (Chinese: 古) is a Chinese surname meaning 'old' or 'ancient'.

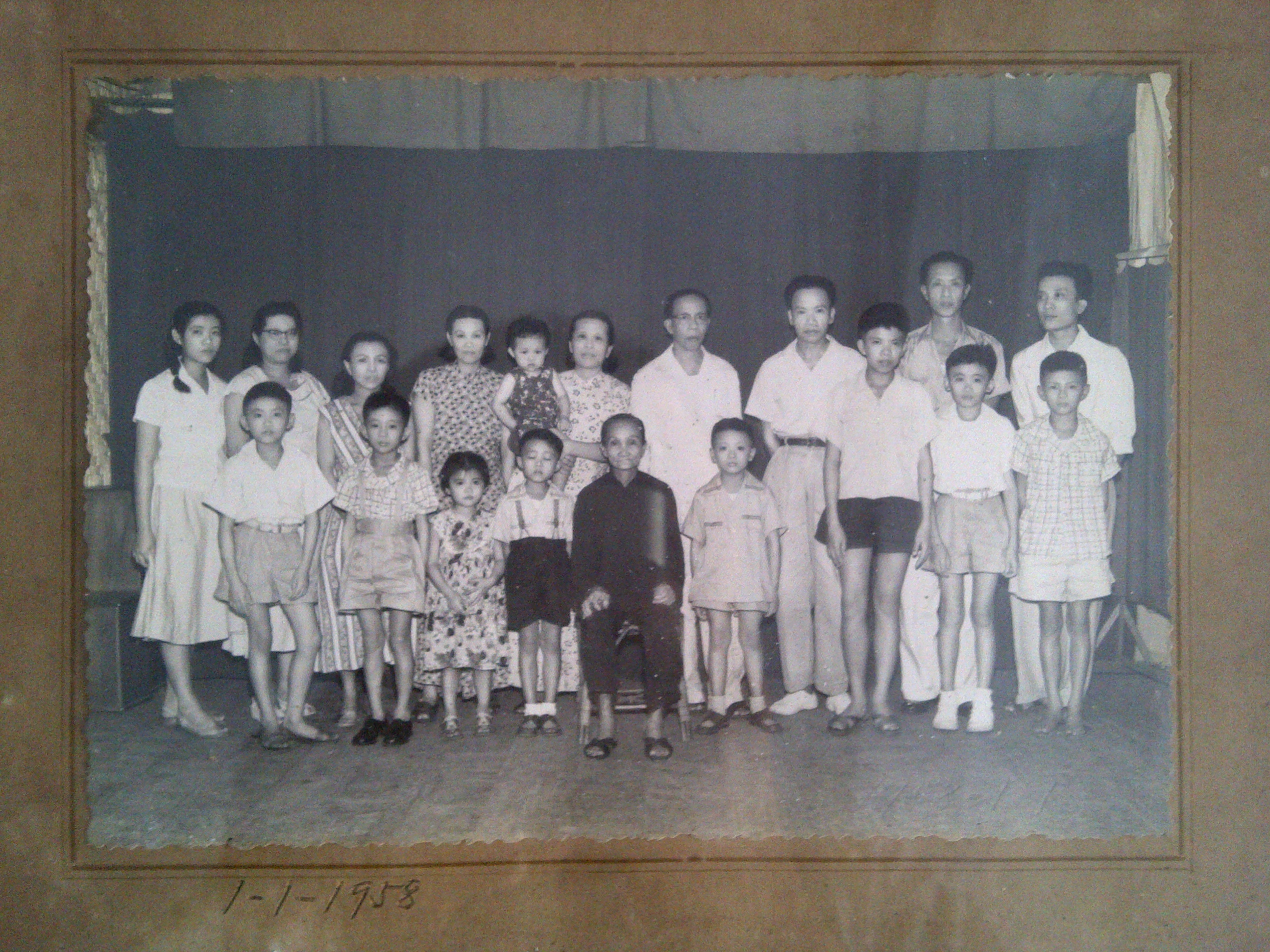
1958 old photograph of Chinese-Indonesian of Gu (古) surname, first until third generations

== Notable people ==
- Gu Long (古龍), pen name of Xiong Yaohua (1938–1985), Chinese novelist, screenwriter, film producer and director based in Taiwan
- Leo Ku (古巨基; born 1972), Hong Kong Cantopop and Mandopop singer, actor, TV host, model, cartoonist, MV director, producer and designer
- Ku Chin-shui (古金水, 1960–2016), Amis Taiwanese decathlete and pole vaulter
- Gu Li (古力; Pinyin: Gǔ Lì; born 1983), Chinese professional Go player
- Louis Koo (古天樂; born 1970), Hong Kong actor and film producer
- Ko Tin Lung (古天農, 1954–2022), Hong Kong film producer
- Koo Sze-yiu (古思堯; born 1949), Hong Kong activist and politician
- Victor Koo or Gu Yongqiang (古永鏘; pinyin: Gǔ Yǒngqiāng; born 1966), Chinese businessman
- Koh Nai Kwong (古乃光; born 1961), Malaysian politician and lawyer
- Koo Kien Keat (古健傑; born 1985), Malaysian former professional badminton player
