= SS Bellatrix =

American cargo ship

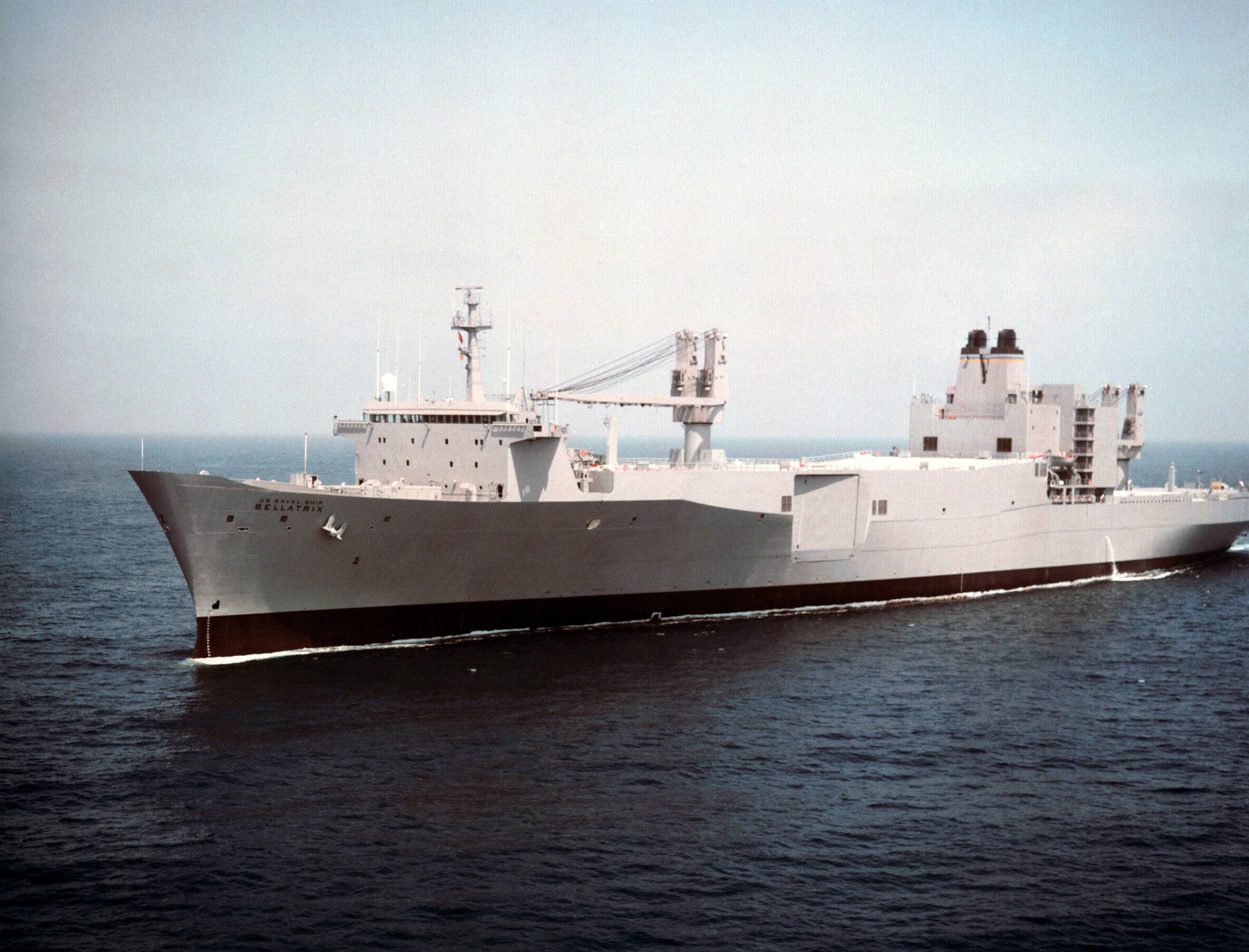

History

United States
- Namesake: Bellatrix
- Operator: United States Navy
- Builder: Rotterdamsche D.D.Mij N.V
- Launched: 1 February 1973
- Acquired: 13 October 1981
- Identification: IMO number: 7236153; MMSI number: 368991000; Callsign: NHLL
- Honors and awards: National Defense Service Medal; Southwest Asia Service Medal; Kuwait Liberation Medal
- Status: Ready Reserve

General characteristics
- Class & type: Algol-class vehicle cargo ship
- Displacement: 55,355 tons (full)
- Length: 946 ft 2 in (288 m)
- Beam: 105 ft 6 in (32 m)
- Draft: 36 ft 4 in (11 m)
- Propulsion: 2 × Foster-Wheeler boilers, 875 psi (61.6kg/cm2); 2 × GE MST-19 steam turbines; 120,000 hp (89.5 MW)
- Speed: 33 knots
- Capacity: 700+ military vehicles (including trucks, tanks, and helicopters)
- Complement: 43 civilians, 12 military technicians (fully operational), 18 civilians (reduced operating status)
- Armament: None
- Aviation facilities: Landing pad

SS Bellatrix (T-AKR 288) is an Algol-class vehicle cargo ship that is currently maintained by the United States Maritime Administration as part of the Military Sealift Command's Ready Reserve Force (RRF). She was built as a high-speed container ship by Rheinstahl Nordseewerke, Emden, West Germany, hull no. 430, for Sea-Land Service, Inc. and named SS Sea-Land Trade, USCG ON 545201, IMO 7236153. Due to her high operating cost, Sea-Land Trade was sold to the United States Navy in October 1981 as USNS Bellatrix (T-AK-288).

In keeping with the pattern of the naming the Algol-class ships after bright stars, the Bellatrix was named after Bellatrix, the third-brightest star in the constellation Orion.

== Conversion ==
Conversion began on 22 October 1982 at National Steel and Shipbuilding in San Diego, California. Her cargo hold was redesigned into a series of decks connected by ramps so vehicles can be driven into and out of the cargo hold for fast loading and unloading. She was also fitted with two sets of two cranes; one set located at midship capable of lifting 35 tons, and another set located aft capable of lifting 50 tons. She was delivered to the Military Sealift Command in 1984 as USNS Bellatrix (T-AKR 288).

== Service ==
When not active, Bellatrix is kept in reduced operating status due to her high operating cost. If needed, she can be activated and ready to sail in 96 hours. Bellatrix took part in the Persian Gulf War in 1990. Along with the other seven Algol class cargo ships, she transported 14 percent of all cargo delivered between the United States and Saudi Arabia during and after the war. In early 2003, Bellatrix was activated to take part in Operation Iraqi Freedom.

On 1 October 2007, Bellatrix was transferred to the United States Maritime Administration. On 1 October 2008, she was transferred to the Ready Reserve Force, losing her USNS designation. If activated, SS Bellatrix will report to the Military Sealift Command. She is currently located in Marrero, Louisiana.
