= Eversand (ship) =

German support vessel

History
- Name: Eversand
- Owner: Federal Ministry of Transport and Digital Infrastructure
- Port of registry: Bremerhaven, Germany
- Builder: Schichau Unterweser, Bremerhaven, Germany
- Yard number: 2246
- Laid down: 12 December 1972
- Launched: 4 April 1973
- Out of service: 2012
- Identification: IMO number: 8136087; Call sign: DBMK
- Fate: sold

History
- Name: Eversand
- Operator: (Netherlands) Van Laar Maritime
- Port of registry: Vanuatu
- Yard number: 2246
- Acquired: 2012
- Identification: IMO number: 8136087; MMSI number: 577112000; Call sign: YJTE4
- Status: active

General characteristics
- Type: buoy tender
- Tonnage: 125.44 GRT
- Length: 29.23 m
- Beam: 6.12 m
- Draft: 1.55 m
- Installed power: 330 kW
- Propulsion: 1 x KHD diesel engine
- Speed: 10.5 knots
- Capacity: 34 tdw
- Crew: 5

Eversand is a support vessel in service with Van Laar Maritime in the North Sea. It served most of its career for the Waterways and Shipping Authority of Bremerhaven, Germany.

== History ==
Eversand was laid down on 12 December 1972 at Schichau Unterweser AG in Bremerhaven, from where it was launched in 1973. It served laying and tending buoys about the mouth of the Weser. The ship also served to spray mudflats to assist in navigation.

The ship was decommissioned by the Waterways and Shipping Authority on 1 September 2012 and sold. It was replaced in service by the Nordergründe.

The ship was acquired and serves as a support vessel for off-shore development with the Dutch company Van Laar Maritime.
