= GU Energy Labs =

American sports nutrition company

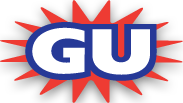
- Type: Private
- Industry: Sports nutrition Food and beverage
- Founded: 1993
- Founder: Bill Vaughan
- Headquarters: Berkeley, California, United States
- Key people: Brian Vaughan, Owner; Magdalena Boulet, President
- Products: GU Energy Gel; GU Chews; GU Electrolyte Tablets; GU Roctane Recovery Protein Drink Mix; GU Roctane Energy Drink Mix; Stroopwafels; Roctane Energy Gel; GU Liquid Energy
- Owner: Brian Vaughan
- Number of employees: 50 (2011)
- Website: guenergy.com

GU Energy Labs is a company based in Berkeley, California, that produces sports nutrition products, most notably energy gels. Often consumed during endurance events, the gels are designed to be quickly and easily digested during any type of activity. Other products include energy chews, drink mixes, hydration tablets, stroopwafels and a Roctane line that includes an energy drink mix, protein recovery drink mix, gel, and capsules. The company was founded in 1994 by Bill Vaughan, who began creating an energy gel product in 1990.

The company has grown over time, and in 2011 its corporate headquarters relocated to a larger space in Berkeley's 4th Street shopping district.

== Background ==
Sports energy gels emerged in the United Kingdom in 1986 as a "convenient, prewrapped, portable" way to deliver carbohydrates during endurance events. Gels have a gooey texture and are sometimes referred to as "goo" generically.

== Company history ==
Bill Vaughan, a biophysicist at University of California, Berkeley, began working on an energy gel product in 1990. He established GU Energy Labs in Berkeley, California, in 1994. GU Energy Labs is regarded as the first major distributor of energy gels, supplying products at the Ironman World Championship in 1996. GU is now run by Bill's son, Brian Vaughan, who serves as president.

In June 2011, GU moved its corporate operations and 50 employees from a 13,000-square-foot (1,200 m^{2}) space to one with twice as much floor space. The larger, 26,000-square-foot (2,400 m^{2}) space, located in Berkeley's 4th Street shopping district, affords the company an increased production capacity, with room for additional growth.

== Products ==
GU Energy Labs produces a variety of performance sports nutrition products, intended to increase the endurance of athletes. Its products include GU Energy Gel, energy chews, drink mixes, hydration tabs, stroopwafels and a line of Roctane products. Their energy gel contains carbohydrates (maltodextrin and fructose), an amino acid blend, electrolytes (sodium and potassium) and, in some flavors, caffeine. Gel packets provide 100 calories and come in a variety of flavors, including triberry, chocolate outrage, mandarin orange, mint chocolate, salted caramel, strawberry banana, and vanilla. The energy chews, created in 2009 and based on the gel formula, are made from similar ingredients but also include antioxidants and come in a chewable form.

GU produces three drink products: the GU Roctane Energy Drink Mix and the GU Roctane Protein Recovery Drink Mix. The Roctane Protein Recovery Drink Mix, designed for consumption following physical activity, was created in 2009 and includes amino acids, antioxidants, carbohydrates, and protein. GU Hydration Tablets contain a low-calorie sweetening agent derived from Stevia.

GU's Roctane line, introduced in 2008, includes an energy gel, energy drink mix, protein recovery drink mix, and capsules. The drink formula contains caffeine (in most flavors), beta-Alanine, taurine, and additional amino acids. Compared to GU's original energy gel, servings of Roctane energy gel contains three times more branched-chain amino acids, more electrolytes, and ten times more histidine.

== See also ==
- Energy bar
- Sports drink
