= Gu Tian =

Concrete ship constructed in China

History
- Laid down: 1970
- Launched: 1973
- Completed: 1973
- Maiden voyage: 1974
- Out of service: ~1974

General characteristics
- Type: Cargo
- Tonnage: 3,000 DWT
- Displacement: 5,773 t (5,682 long tons)
- Length: 105.2 m (345 ft 2 in)
- Beam: 14.5 m (47 ft 7 in)
- Height: 8.1 m (26 ft 7 in)

Gu Tian (Chinese: 古田) was a cargo ship situated in Mawei, Fujian. Built in the 1970s, it was the largest concrete ship ever constructed in China. The vessel displaced 5,773 tonnes (5,682 long tons) and measured 105.2 metres (345 ft) long with a beam of 14.5 metres (48 ft). High running costs led to the ship being abandoned and stranded ashore.

Now derelict, the ship has been stranded for more than 40 years, but, being made of concrete, does not deteriorate. Work began in November 2012 to dismantle the ship.
