= SeaLand =

Shipping and containerization company

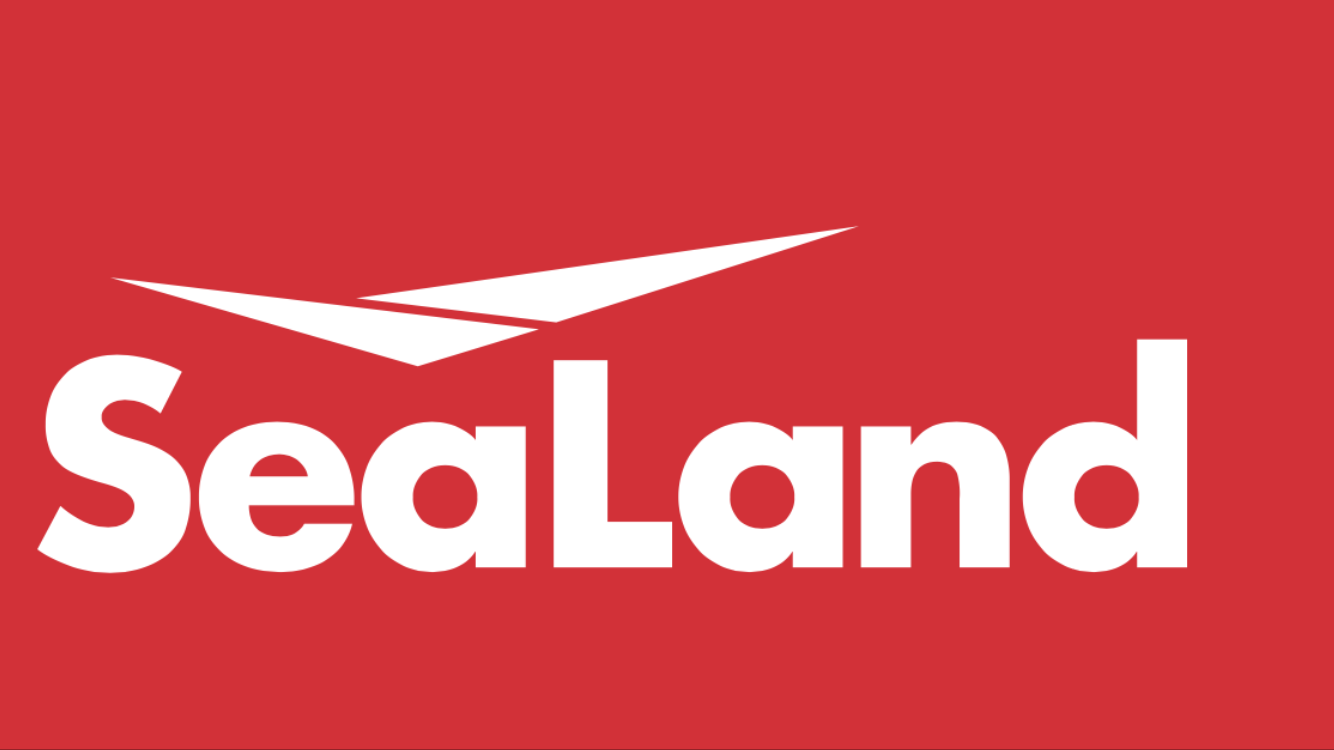

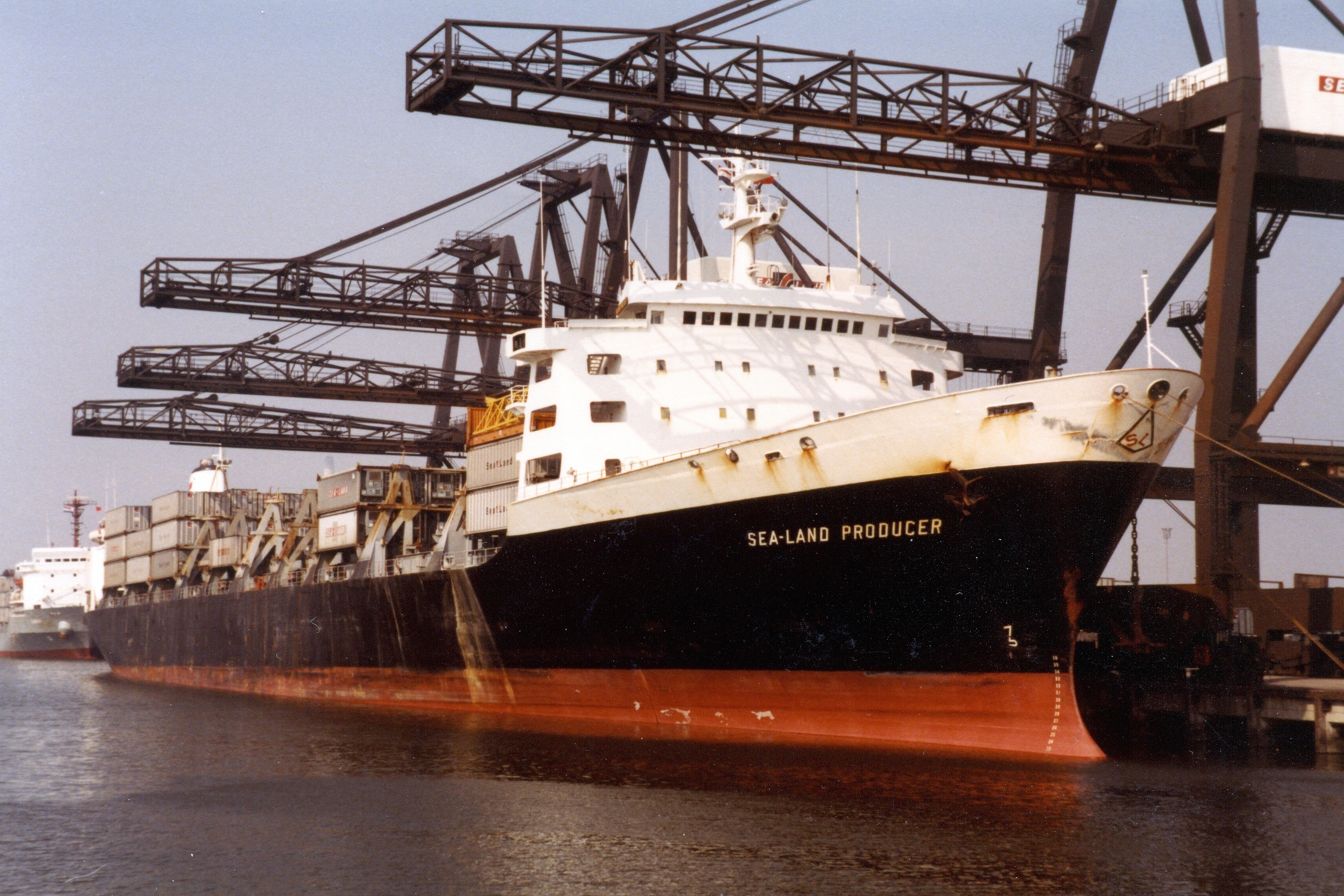
- Formerly: Pan-Atlantic Steamship Corporation
- Industry: Shipping
- Founded: 1956
- Founder: Malcom McLean
- Defunct: 2023
- Headquarters: Miramar, Florida, U.S.
- Parent: Maersk
- Website: www.sealandmaersk.com

Sea-Land (later known as Maersk SeaLand and SeaLand) was an American intra-regional container shipping company headquartered in Miramar, Florida with representation in 29 countries across the Americas. It offered ocean and intermodal services using container ships, trucks, and rail serving customers between North and South America, Central America, and the Caribbean.

== History ==
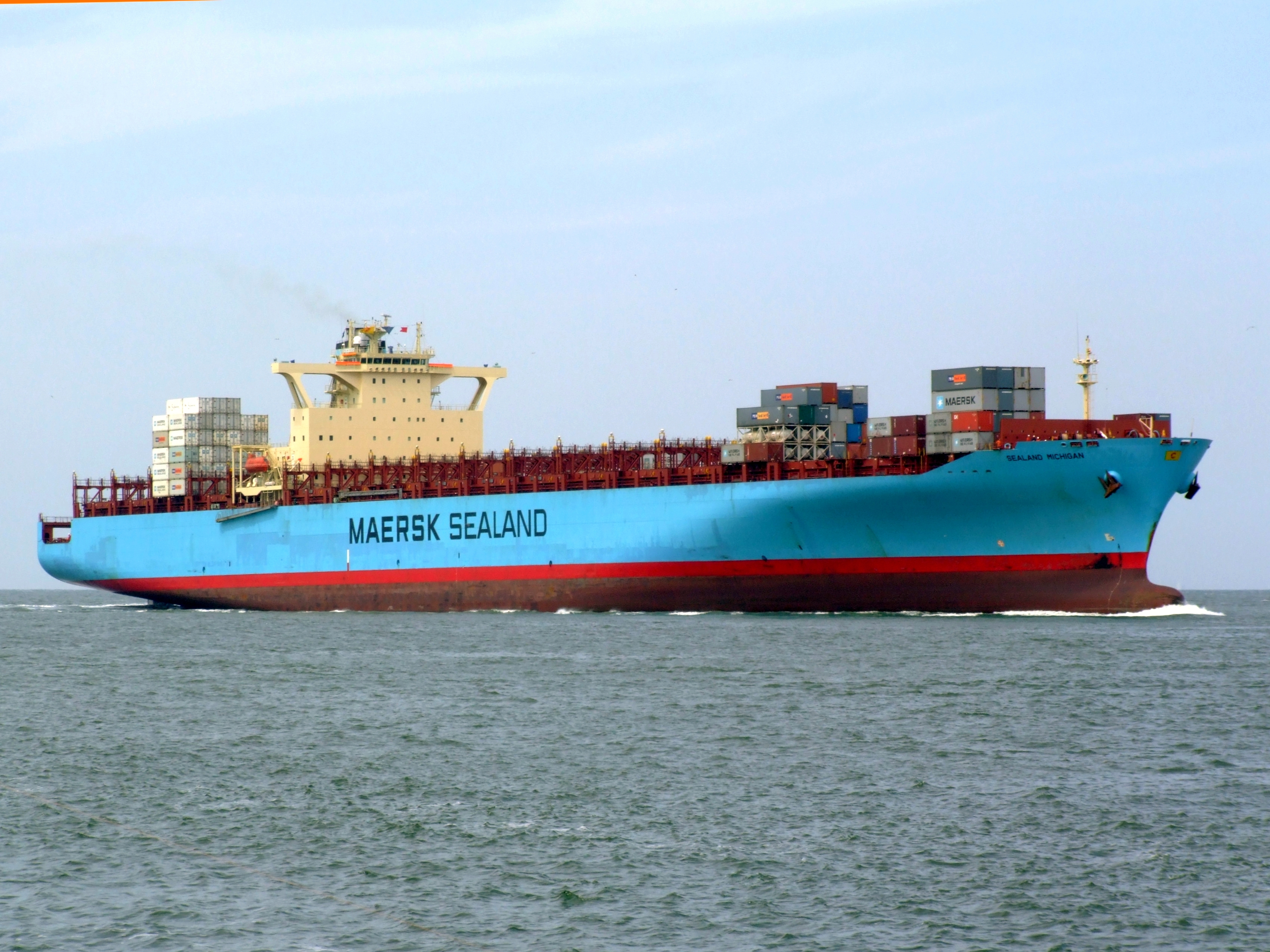
Sealand Michigan in May 2007

Sea-Land was founded by Malcom McLean as the Pan-Atlantic Steamship Corporation. This process offered companies significant time and cost savings that facilitated distribution and expanded international trade.

On April 26, 1956, McLean introduced the world's first container ship, Ideal-X, which sailed from Newark, New Jersey to Houston, Texas with 58 aluminum trailers (containers) on its deck.

In April 1960, the company name was rebranded from Pan-Atlantic Steamship Corporation to Sea-Land.

From 1967 to 1973, Sea-Land became notable for delivering 1,200 containers a month to the Indochina peninsula during the Vietnam War, resulting in $450 million in revenues from the United States Defense Department.

From January 1969 to 1999, Sea-Land was owned by RJ Reynolds Tobacco Company, CSX and others.

In March 1999, CSX separated Sea-Land into three entities: an international shipping company, a domestic shipping company, and a terminal operator. In December 1999, Maersk acquired the international container shipping business.

In 2000, Maersk Line changed its commercial name globally to Maersk SeaLand. In 2003, the Carlyle Group bought the domestic shipping line from CSX and changed the name to Horizon Lines.

In 2006, the commercial name SeaLand ceased to exist when Maersk SeaLand was rebranded as Maersk Line after the purchase of P&O Nedlloyd.

In January 2014, due to the strong brand recognition throughout the intra-Americas region, Maersk announced the revival of the SeaLand brand as a specialized intra-regional carrier, taking over the existing Maersk Line network for intra-Americas trade starting January 2015. In January 2023, Maersk announced it would retire the brand.
