= USS Sylvania (AFS-2) =

Cargo ship of the United States Navy

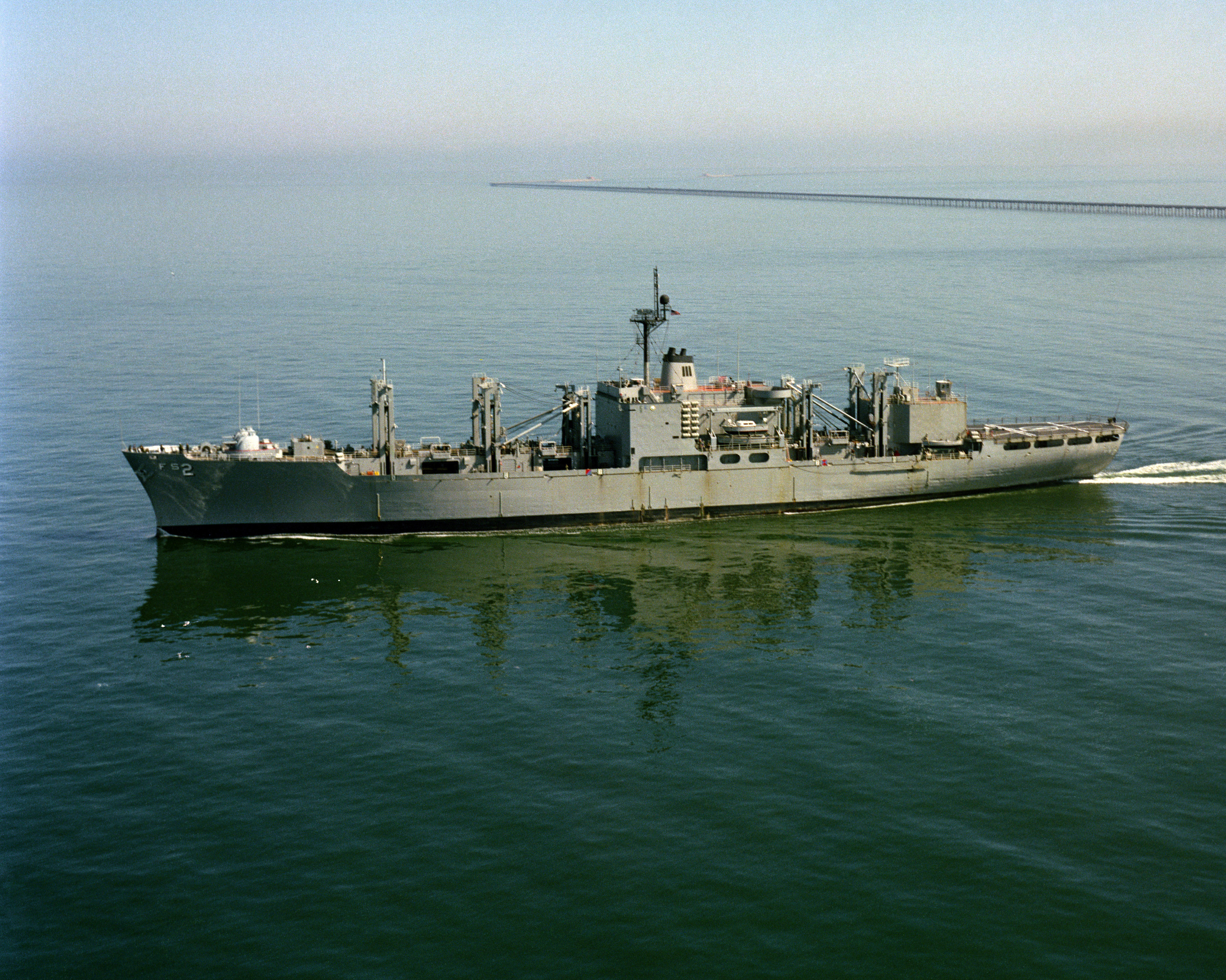
- USS Sylvania (AFS-2) underway in 1982

History

United States
- Name: USS Sylvania
- Namesake: Sylvania, Ohio
- Builder: National Steel and Shipbuilding Company, San Diego, California
- Laid down: 18 August 1962
- Launched: 15 August 1963
- Commissioned: 11 July 1964
- Decommissioned: 26 May 1994
- Stricken: 26 May 1994
- Fate: Sold for scrapping, 28 July 2001

General characteristics
- Class & type: Mars-class combat stores ship
- Displacement: 17,500 long tons (17,781 t) full load
- Length: 581 ft (177.1 m)
- Beam: 79 ft (24.1 m)
- Draft: 27 ft (8.2 m)
- Propulsion: 3 × Babcock & Wilcox boilers; 1 × De Laval turbine, 1 shaft
- Speed: 20 knots (37 km/h; 23 mph)
- Complement: 486
- Armament: 4 × 3"/50 caliber guns (2×2) (originally 6); Chaff launchers; 4 × M240G 7.62×51mm medium machine guns or M249 5.56×45mm light MG; 1 M2 12.7×99mm heavy machine gun when security detachment is embarked
- Aircraft carried: 2 × MH-60S Knighthawk helicopters

USS Sylvania (AFS-2), a Mars-class combat stores ship, was the second ship of the United States Navy to be named Sylvania.

Sylvania was laid down on 18 August 1962 at the National Steel and Shipbuilding Company in San Diego, California; launched on 10 August 1963; sponsored by Mrs. Cyrus R. Vance; and commissioned on 11 July 1964.

== Service history ==
=== 1964–1970 ===
At the time of commissioning, Sylvania was the second of a new class of combat store ship designed to combine the functions of the AF (store ship), AKS (stores issue ship), and AVS (aviation issue ship). She completed fitting out and, after sea trials, departed California for duty with the Atlantic Fleet. The Panama Canal was transited on 11 August, and the ship arrived at Norfolk on 16 October 1964 for post-shakedown availability. Upon completion of this, the ship operated in the Norfolk area until the spring of 1965.

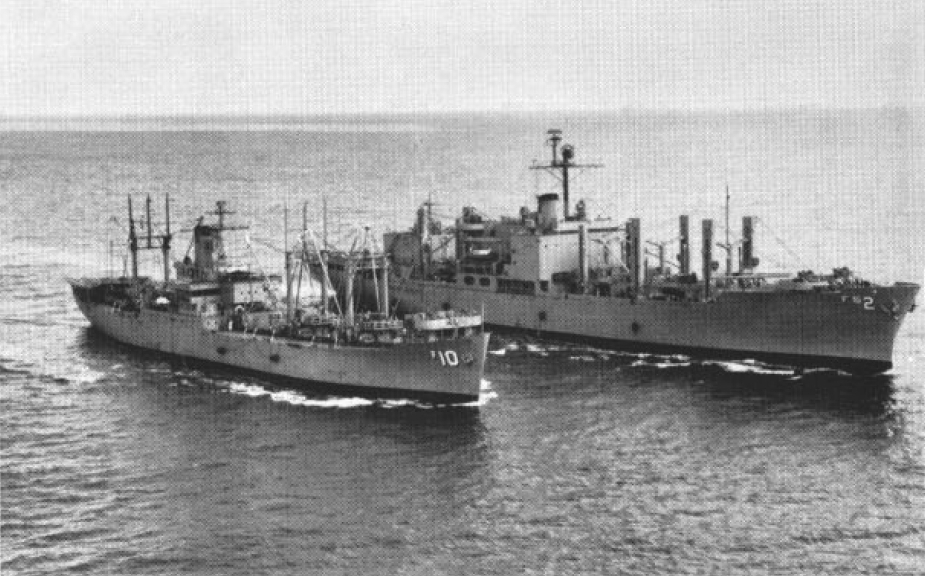
USS Aldebaran (AF-10) with Sylvania in 1964.

Sylvania stood out of Norfolk on 14 April 1965, en route to the Mediterranean and her first tour of duty with the 6th Fleet. She called at Rota, Spain, and arrived at her new home port, Naples, Italy, on 29 April. Two days later, she began her first underway replenishment operation with the 6th Fleet. On 31 July, Sylvania completed the first vertical replenishment of an aircraft carrier using UH-46A helicopters. In early October the store ship logged her 1,000th accident-free helicopter landing. She served as flagship for the Service Force, 6th Fleet, from 5 December 1966 to 17 April 1967. During the night of 8 January 1968, the cargo ship suffered her only material loss of the year. She experienced a roll of 38 degrees and took water over the flight deck. The roll, wind, and water parted the tie-downs on cargo staged on the flight deck for the next day's replenishment. Consequently, 52 pallets of provisions were lost. On 1 July 1968, Sylvania was awarded the Battle Efficiency "E" for her class and the Supply "E" for Supply Efficiency. She also won the Marjorie Sterrett Battleship Fund Award for the Atlantic Fleet.

As part of Task Force 60 and as independently directed by COMSIXTHFLT, Sylvania came to the assistance of USS Liberty on 8 June 1967 when she suffered an unprovoked attack by Israeli naval and air forces during the six day Arab-Israel war. <1537Z08 June 1967 drafted message text from Commander, Sixth Fleet to U.S.S. Sylvania>

Sylvania was honored on 19 October by a visit from the Assistant Secretary of the Navy, Charles A. Bowser, and a party of eight who came aboard for a briefing and tour and to observe an underway replenishment exercise. The ship was in drydock at Malta from 29 November until 10 December 1968 when she returned to normal 6th Fleet operations. On 16 June 1969 the ship lost a UH-46D helicopter when it crashed during vertical replenishment operations in the harbor of Palma de Mallorca, but the crew was rescued. On 30 September, the ship left the 6th Fleet and returned to Norfolk on 24 October after an absence of four and one-half years.

=== 1970–1976 ===
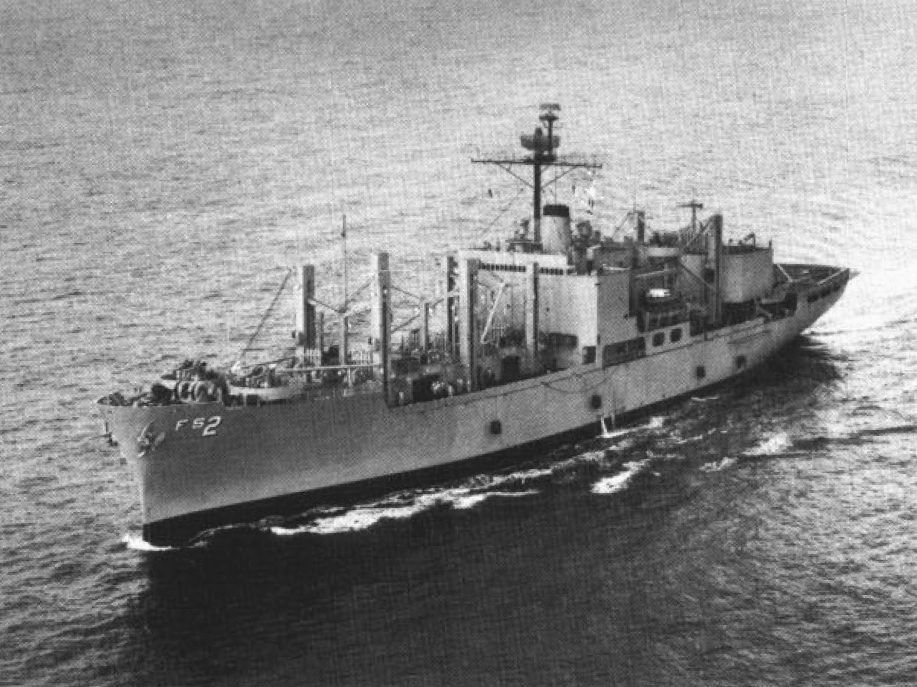
USS Sylvania (AFS-2) underway, circa 1970.

Sylvania deployed to the 6th Fleet again from 28 December 1969 to 15 February 1970. She then began preparations for her first overhaul since commissioning. The ship was in drydock from 11 April to 13 May when she moored at the shipyard, and was ready for sea on 13 July. On 20 July the ship was awarded the Meritorious Unit Commendation for service to the 6th Fleet during the period 25 April 1965 to 30 September 1969. The next day, Admiral Elmo R. Zumwalt, Jr., Chief of Naval Operations, visited Sylvania. The period from 13 August to 11 September was spent in refresher training at Guantanamo Bay.

Sylvania stood out of Norfolk on 18 November 1970 to begin a six-month deployment in logistic support of the 6th Fleet and returned to Norfolk on 17 May 1971. In June, the ship entered the Norfolk Naval Shipyard for a four-month restricted availability period.

Sylvania left the yard on 4 October 1971 and, from 23–27 October, conducted a four-day port call at Fort Lauderdale, Florida. After two weeks of refresher training at Guantanamo Bay, she returned to Norfolk for another two-month availability period. The ship then commenced pre-deployment loadout and underway training in the Virginia Capes area until mid-February. Sylvania then deployed to the Mediterranean in support of the 6th Fleet from 24 February to 26 August 1972. After five weeks of re-loading supplies at Norfolk, the cargo ship returned to the Mediterranean, from 2 October to 10 November 1972, to replenish the AFS that was on station there. The remainder of the year 1972 and until 5 March 1973 was spent at Norfolk in upkeep and underway training.

Sylvania, sailed to Guantanamo Bay and held refresher training from 6–16 March 1973 and then paid a three-day visit to Cape Kennedy before returning to her home port on 23 March. She stood out of Norfolk on 25 May 1973 for another tour with the 6th Fleet and relieved Concord (AFS-5) as the on-station AFS on 16 June. She, in turn, was relieved by San Diego (AFS-6) on 12 November and returned to Norfolk on 3 December 1973.

Sylvania operated out of Norfolk until early September 1974 when she again deployed to the Mediterranean for duty with the 6th Fleet.

In September 1976, returning from a routine deployment, Sylvania had the honor of transporting the world-famous King Tutankhamun Exhibition to America for the Metropolitan Museum of Art in New York City.

=== 1980–1989 ===
During the 1980s Syvlania was assigned to Service Squadron Four and Service Group Two. Service Squadron Four consisted of nine logistic support ships assigned the vital mission of providing food, fuel, supplies, repair parts and ammunition to Naval units of the Second and Sixth Fleets. In this capacity Sylvania assumed the duties of deployed, on-station combat stores ship in early 1980, again from May through November 1981, in 1983 where the ship received the Navy Expeditionary Medal for her participation in Sixth Fleet peacekeeping efforts in Lebanon, again over the Winter of 1983 and early 1984, and in late 1984.

In 1985 Sylvania went through a major overhaul in Norfolk, Virginia in which all of its systems were upgraded and much needed repairs made. This put her out of the deployment rotation for over a full year. During this period USNS Sirius (T-AFS-8) was upgraded to be able to conduct full operations as a combat stores ship and was included in the Fleet AFS rotation. In 1986, Sylvania successfully left overhaul and conducted replenishment operations and refresher training in the Caribbean. This included training operations at Guantanamo Bay Naval Base and ship visits to Ocho Rios, Jamaica, and Nassau, Bahamas. While at Nassau, the ship was visited by actor Sidney Poitier.

With her reentry to the Fleet, the East Coast combat stores complement now included Sylvania, USNS Sirius (T-AFS-8), USS Concord (AFS-5), and USS San Diego (AFS-6). Thus, while Sylvania's operational tempo prior to this time was to deploy every eight to twelve months, with five months on station, the period was lengthened to every twelve to fifteen months, with five months on station. Yard overhaul and maintenance, at-sea refresher training, and local at-sea training operations were conducted between the periods deployed on station. Thus, Sylvania deployed to the Mediterranean over the winter of 1986 and early 1987, and once again in early 1988. In between deployments the ship conducted Second Fleet operations, visiting Miami, Florida, and attending Fleet Week in New York City.

A typical monthly cycle for Sylvania in the Mediterranean during this period was for the ship to steam three or four thousand miles, delivering goods to between 40 and 70 ships. On average, 2,000 to 3,000 pallets of material would be moved via underway replenishment, with roughly half being transferred by vertical replenishment via helicopter. After an arduous three weeks the ship typically would visit a port for several days of recreation, maintenance, and resupply. Typical ports included Málaga, Alicante, Torremolinos, Cartagena, Rota, and Palma, Spain; Toulon and Marseilles, France; Augusta Bay, Sicily and Naples, Italy; the British territory of Gibraltar; Haifa, Israel; Antalya, Turkey; and Piraeus, Greece.

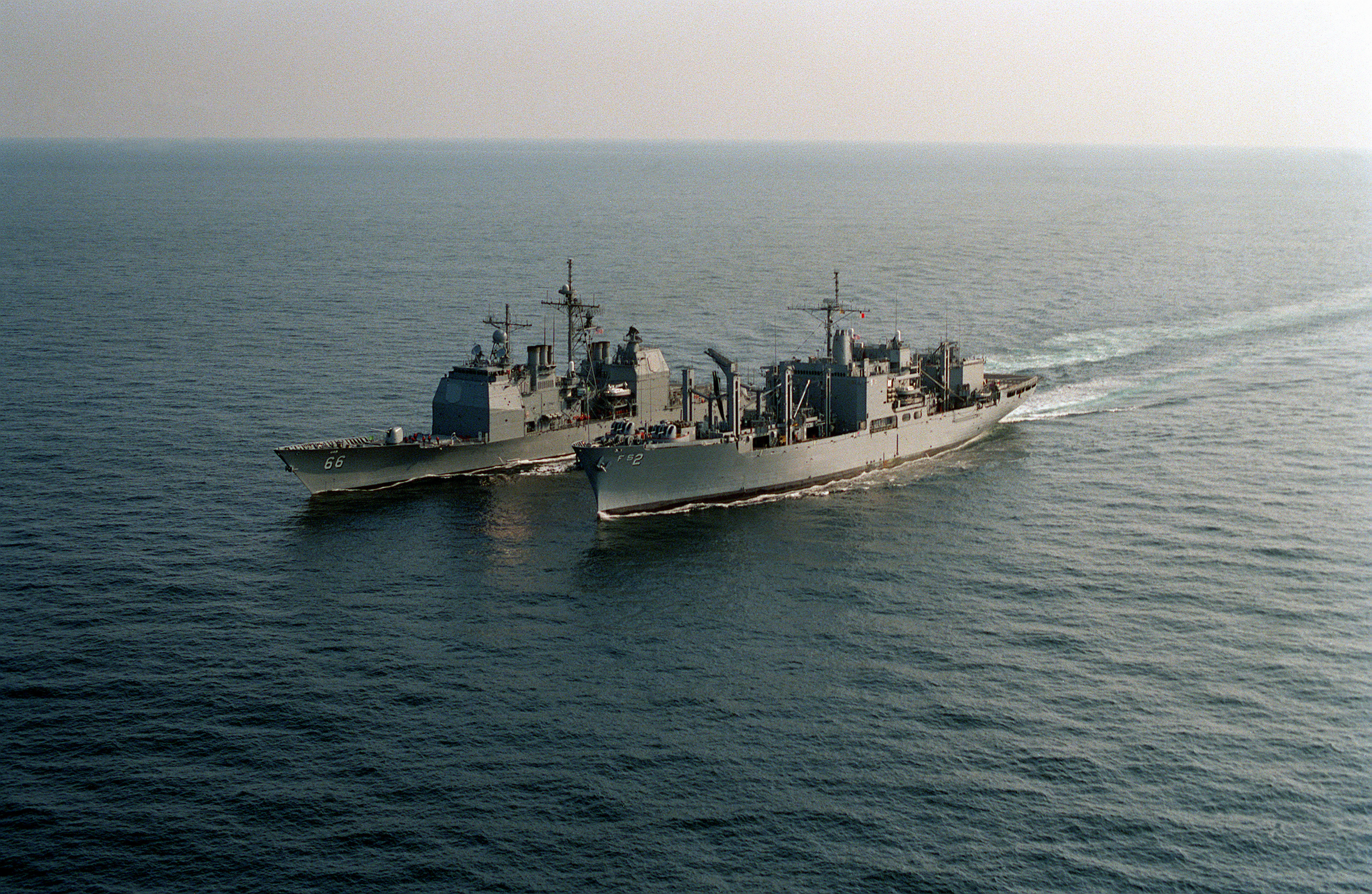
Sylvania with USS Hué City (CG-66) in 1993.

=== 1990–2001 ===
In 1990 she deployed to the Mediterranean Sea and eventually the Red Sea in support of Operation "Desert Shield". She then supplied three carrier battle groups within one week during the lead up to "Desert Storm" in 1991.

Sylvania was decommissioned on 26 May 1994 and laid up in the Atlantic Reserve Fleet, Philadelphia, Pennsylvania. She was struck from the Naval Vessel Register on 5 January 1995. Sylvania's title was transferred to the Maritime Administration and she was eventually sold for scrapping in 2012.

== Honors and awards ==
The USS Sylvania is authorized the following awards:

Top Row - Navy Unit Commendation - Navy Meritorious Unit Commendation (2) Second Row - Navy "E" Ribbon (2) - Navy Expeditionary Medal (4-Lebanon) - National Defense Service Medal (2) Third Row - Armed Forces Expeditionary Medal (1-Lebanon) - Southwest Asia Service Medal (2) - Kuwait Liberation Medal (Kuwait)
