= RFA Tarbatness =

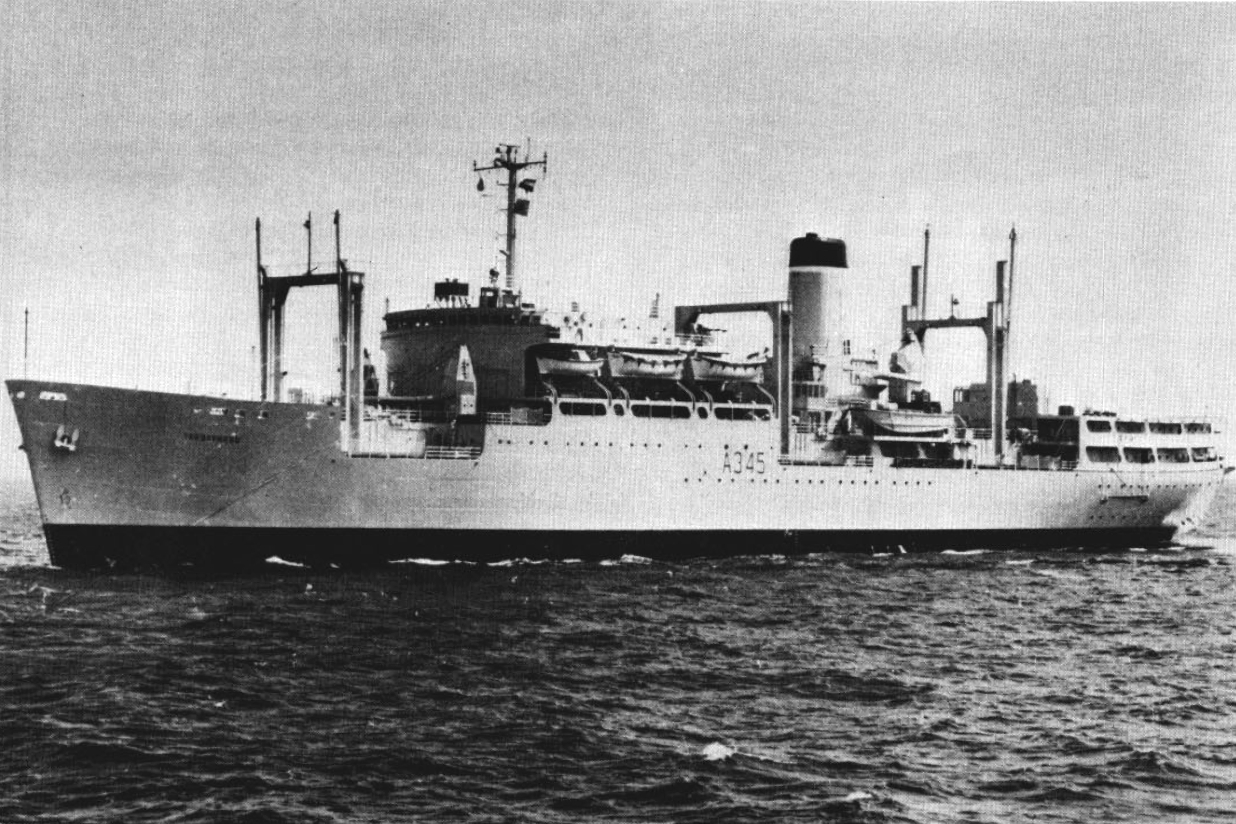
- RFA Tarbatness (A345)

History

United Kingdom
- Name: RFA Tarbatness
- Namesake: likely for Tarbat Ness in Scotland
- Ordered: 7 December 1964
- Builder: Swan Hunter
- Yard number: 2018
- Laid down: 15 April 1966
- Launched: 28 February 1967
- Commissioned: 10 August 1967
- Decommissioned: 1980
- Fate: Chartered by US MSC, later bought

United States
- Name: USNS Spica
- Acquired: 30 September 1981
- Commissioned: 1 November 1981
- Decommissioned: 26 January 2008
- Renamed: 5 November 1981
- Fate: Sunk as target in Training exercise Sinkex, 9 May 2009.

General characteristics
- Class & type: Ness-class combat stores ship
- Displacement: 16,792 long tons (17,061 t) full load
- Length: 523 ft 4 in (159.51 m)
- Beam: 72 ft 3 in (22.02 m)
- Draft: 25 ft 6 in (7.77 m)
- Propulsion: 1 × 8-cylinder Sulzer diesel
- Speed: 17 knots (31 km/h)
- Complement: 110 RFA + 50 Stores Working Party
- Aviation facilities: Fitted with a flight deck but no hangar facilities until purchased by USMSC

RFA Tarbatness (A345) was a fleet stores ship of the Royal Fleet Auxiliary.

In 1981, the ship was bought by the United States Military Sealift Command to serve as USNS Spica (T-AFS-9).
