= USS San Jose =

Cargo ship of the United States Navy

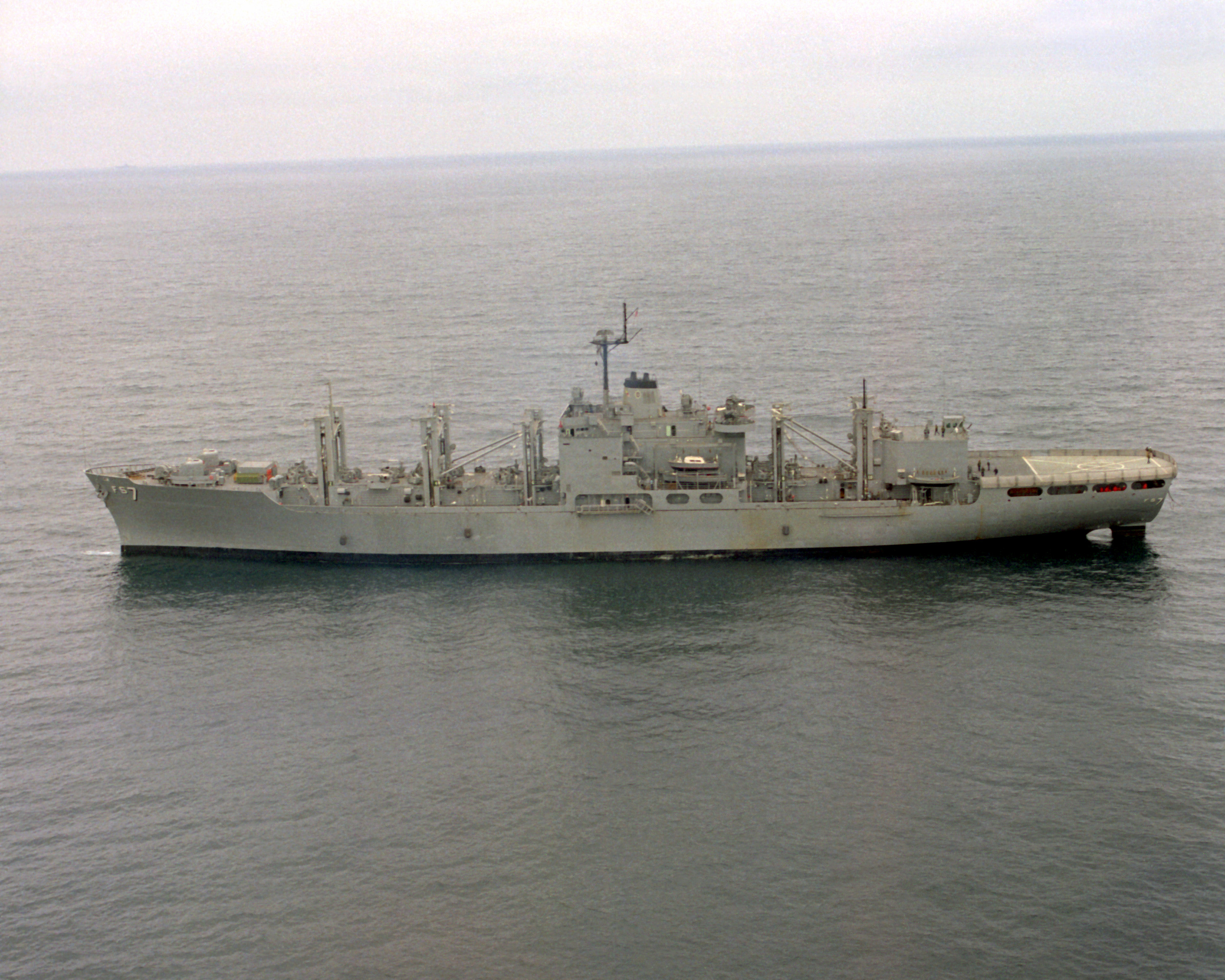
- San Jose off San Diego, 1971

History

United States
- Name: San Jose
- Namesake: San Jose, California
- Owner: United States Navy
- Operator: Military Sealift Command
- Awarded: 7 July 1967
- Builder: National Steel and Shipbuilding Company
- Laid down: 8 March 1969
- Launched: 13 December 1969
- Sponsored by: Mrs Robert Ellis, III, for the sponsor, her mother, Mrs George L. Murphy
- Commissioned: 23 October 1970 as USS San Jose (AFS-7)
- Decommissioned: 2 November 1993
- In service: 2 November 1993 as USNS San Jose (T-AFS-7)
- Out of service: January 2010
- Stricken: 27 January 2010
- Identification: MMSI number: 367857000; Callsign: NIBV
- Honors and awards: three battle stars for service in the Vietnam War
- Fate: Scrapped, 2013

General characteristics
- Class & type: Mars-class combat stores ship
- Displacement: 9843 tons light; 17,373 tons full
- Length: 581 ft (177 m)
- Beam: 79 ft (24 m)
- Draft: 28 ft (8.5 m)
- Propulsion: three 580 psi Babcock & Wilcox boilers; one De Laval Turbine; single shaft
- Speed: 20 kn (37 km/h; 23 mph)
- Complement: (MSC) 49 Navy, 124 civilian merchant seamen
- Armament: 4 × 3-inch/50 dual-purpose guns (2 × 2) [originally equipped with 8 × 3-inch/50 guns], Chaff Launchers, 4 × M240G 7.62×51mm medium machine guns or M249 5.56×45mm light MG, and 1 M2 12.7×99mm heavy machine gun when security detachment is embarked. None as (USNS)
- Aircraft carried: two UH-46 Sea Knight helicopters

USS San Jose (AFS-7) was a Mars-class combat stores ship acquired by the U.S. Navy (USN) in 1970. She served as a Navy ship until November 1993, and was involved in the Vietnam War and the Persian Gulf War. The ship was transferred to the Military Sealift Command (MSC), and was redesignated USNS San Jose (T-AFS-7). As an MSC vessel, San Jose was involved in the INTERFET peacekeeping taskforce, the response to the December 2004 Indian Ocean tsunami, as well as the wars in Afghanistan and Iraq. The ship was deactivated in 2010, and was sold for scrap in 2013.

== Design and construction ==
San Jose was laid down on 8 March 1969 by the National Steel and Shipbuilding Company, San Diego; launched on 13 December 1969; christened by Mrs Robert Ellis, III, for the sponsor, her mother, Mrs George L. Murphy; and commissioned on 23 October 1970.

== Operational history ==
=== United States Navy ===
Following commissioning and fitting out, San Jose, the first combat stores ship of the Pacific Fleet Service Force to receive the U-1500 computer system, conducted training drills; made a short cruise to Acapulco, Mexico, out of San Diego, California; and carried out ship's qualification trials out of Long Beach, California, before steaming to her home port, Oakland Supply Depot, California, in February 1971. Arriving on 10 February, she took on her first PACFILL (Pacific Fleet Issue Load List) stock, and, in March, completed final contract trials. Shakedown and availability followed. In July, she moved north to British Columbia to participate in the observance of that province's Centennial. August took her to Seattle, Washington. On 10 September, she received two UH-46 helicopters from detachment HC-3; and departed Alameda the next day for her first WestPac deployment.

The stores ship arrived at Subic Bay, Philippines, on 27 September; topped off her load; and, on 4 October, departed for the Tonkin Gulf and her first line swing. On 6 October, she conducted her first simultaneous vertical replenishment, with her first underway replenishment of a carrier task group occurring the next day. From the Tonkin Gulf, San Jose delivered freight at Danang, Cam Ranh Bay, and Vũng Tàu; then conducted underway replenishments off the southern coast of South Vietnam before moving on to a port visit at Singapore, whence she headed back to the Philippines to take on more cargo. San Jose returned to Subic Bay on 23 October and, by the end of November, had completed three more line swings. On 10 December, she completed her fifth line swing, and, at mid-month, commenced her sixth. The deployment to the western Pacific Ocean ended on 16 March 1972, when she departed Subic Bay to return to the United States. Proceeding via Apra Harbor, Guam, and Pearl Harbor, Hawaii, she arrived in Oakland at the end of the month.

San Jose resumed local operations out of Oakland and NAS Alameda, California, until redeploying to the U.S. 7th Fleet on 26 August 1972. She arrived in Subic Bay on 12 September and, after nine months supporting the 7th Fleet in the Far East, departed Sasebo, Japan, on 11 June 1973 to return to the United States. She arrived at San Francisco, California, on the 22d and resumed local operations. Through June 1974, San Jose continued to cruise the western coastline of the United States, based at San Francisco. Following the conclusion of US involvement in the Vietnam War, San Jose was awarded three battle stars for service during the conflict: Consolidation I, Consolidation II, and Vietnam Ceasefire.

The ship was stationed at Naval Station Guam from late 1981 to the early 1990s to support the United States Seventh Fleet, along with sister ships Niagara Falls and White Plains. During 1990 and 1991, she served during Operations Desert Shield and Desert Storm, later known as the Persian Gulf War.

=== Military Sealift Command ===
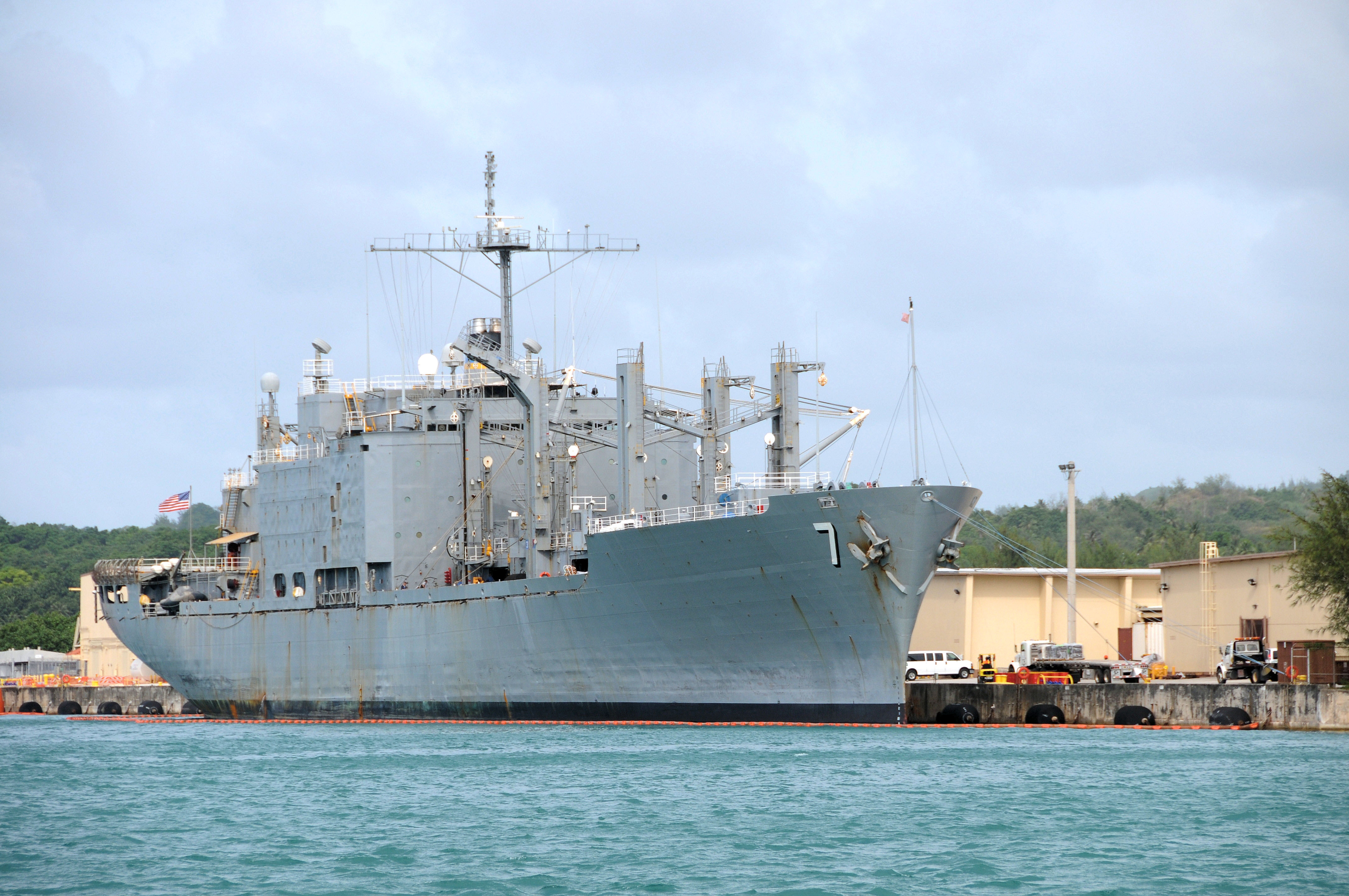
San Jose at Naval Base Guam in 2010

San Jose was decommissioned and transferred to Military Sealift Command on 2 November 1993. She was deployed to East Timor as part of the Australian-led INTERFET peacekeeping taskforce from 25 to 31 October 1999. In 2005, San Jose provided logistics support to hospital ship Mercy in efforts to provide assistance to victims of the December 2004 tsunami in Southeast Asia. San Jose most recently provided logistics support to Navy ships in the Persian Gulf supporting both Operation Enduring Freedom in Afghanistan and Operation Iraqi Freedom.

== Deactivation and fate ==
On 20 July 2009, the US Navy announced that the ship would be inactivated on 27 January 2010. San Jose was sold for scrapping for $995,928 on 1 October 2013 to All Star Metals, Brownsville, Texas.
