= Mars-class combat stores ship =

Class of auxiliary vessel

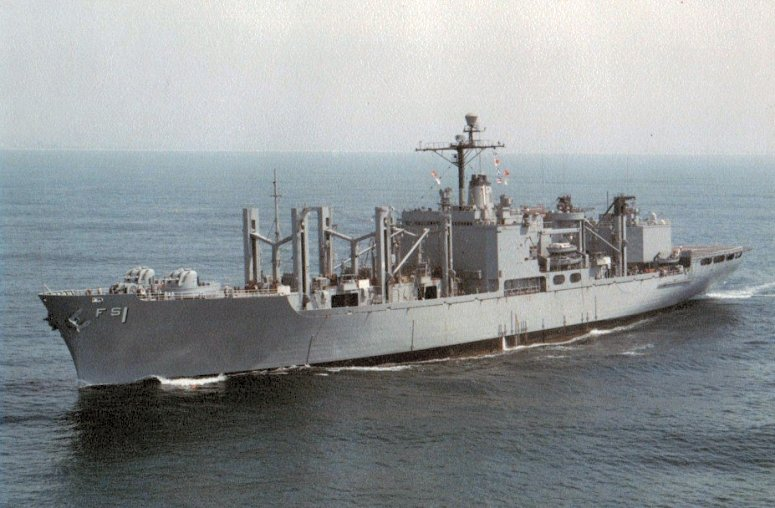
- USS Mars (AFS-1), lead ship of the class

Class overview
- Builders: National Steel and Shipbuilding Company
- Operators: United States Navy
- Succeeded by: Lewis and Clark-class dry cargo ship
- Built: 1962–1970
- In commission: 1963–1998
- Completed: 7
- Retired: 7

General characteristics
- Type: Combat stores ship
- Displacement: 9,200 long tons (9,348 t) light; 15,900–18,663 long tons (16,155–18,962 t) full load
- Length: 581 ft (177.1 m)
- Beam: 79 ft (24.1 m)
- Draft: 28 ft (8.5 m)
- Propulsion: 3 × Babcock & Wilcox boilers, 580 psi (3.7 MPa); 825 °F (440 °C); 1 × De Laval turbine; 22,000 shp (16.4 MW) sustained; 1 shaft
- Speed: 21 knots (39 km/h; 24 mph)
- Complement: 486 officers and enlisted men (in Navy commission); 26 Navy personnel, 118 civilians (Military Sealift Command)
- Sensors & processing systems: Mark 56 fire-control system
- Armament: 4 × 3"/50 caliber guns (2×2) (originally 8 (4x2)); Chaff Launchers; 4 × M240G 7.62×51mm medium machine guns or M249 5.56×45mm light MG; 1 M2 12.7×99mm heavy machine gun when security detachment is embarked
- Aircraft carried: 2 × UH-46 Sea Knight helicopters

The Mars-class combat stores ships were a class of seven auxiliary vessels of the United States Navy. The ships were designed for underway replenishment, in support of carrier task force groups, carrying miscellaneous stores and munitions. Initially they carried no fuel oil or liquid cargo, but by the early 1990s the class was refitted with limited refuel capacities for F-76 fuel. None of the original seven ships originally commissioned by the US Navy remain in service. The Mars class was replaced by the Lewis and Clark-class dry cargo ships.

Cargo capacity of the each ship was approximately 7,000 tons in five holds, with hangar space for two UH-46 helicopters.

== Brief history ==
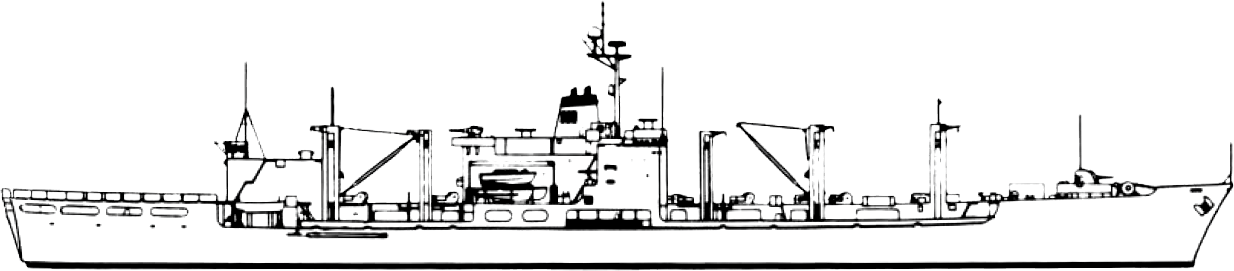
1981 line drawing of a Mars-class combat stores ship

Vessels in the class were constructed in mid-1960s, while early units commissioned in the late 1960s served in the Vietnam War. The vessels supported combat operations off the coast.

These ships continued to support naval units during their time in service in US Navy until the mid-1990s. Mars-class ships were present and supported operations in Red Sea and the Persian Gulf during Operations Desert Shield and Desert Storm. By the mid-1990s, five of the seven ships were transferred to the Military Sealift Command.

== Ships ==
The ships of the class are named for American resort and significant historical towns/cities.

- Mars (AFS-1) – decommissioned 1998; sunk as a SINKEX target off Hawaii, 2006
- Sylvania (AFS-2) – decommissioned, 26 May 1994; James River, Virginia, National Defense Reserve Fleet, scrapped 2012.
- Niagara Falls (AFS-3) – transferred to Military Sealift Command, September 1994, served with Military Sealift Command until 1998, sunk as target 14 July 2012.
- White Plains (AFS-4) – decommissioned, 1995; inactivated 2002, sunk as SINKEX target in RIMPAC exercise,
- Concord (AFS-5) – transferred to Military Sealift Command, 15 October 1992, served with Military Sealift Command until 1998, inactivated in 2008, sunk as part of a SINKEX exercise.
- San Diego (AFS-6) – transferred to Military Sealift Command, 1993; scrapped, 2006
- San Jose (AFS-7) – transferred to Military Sealift Command, 1993; inactivated January 2010, scrapped 2012.

== Photos ==
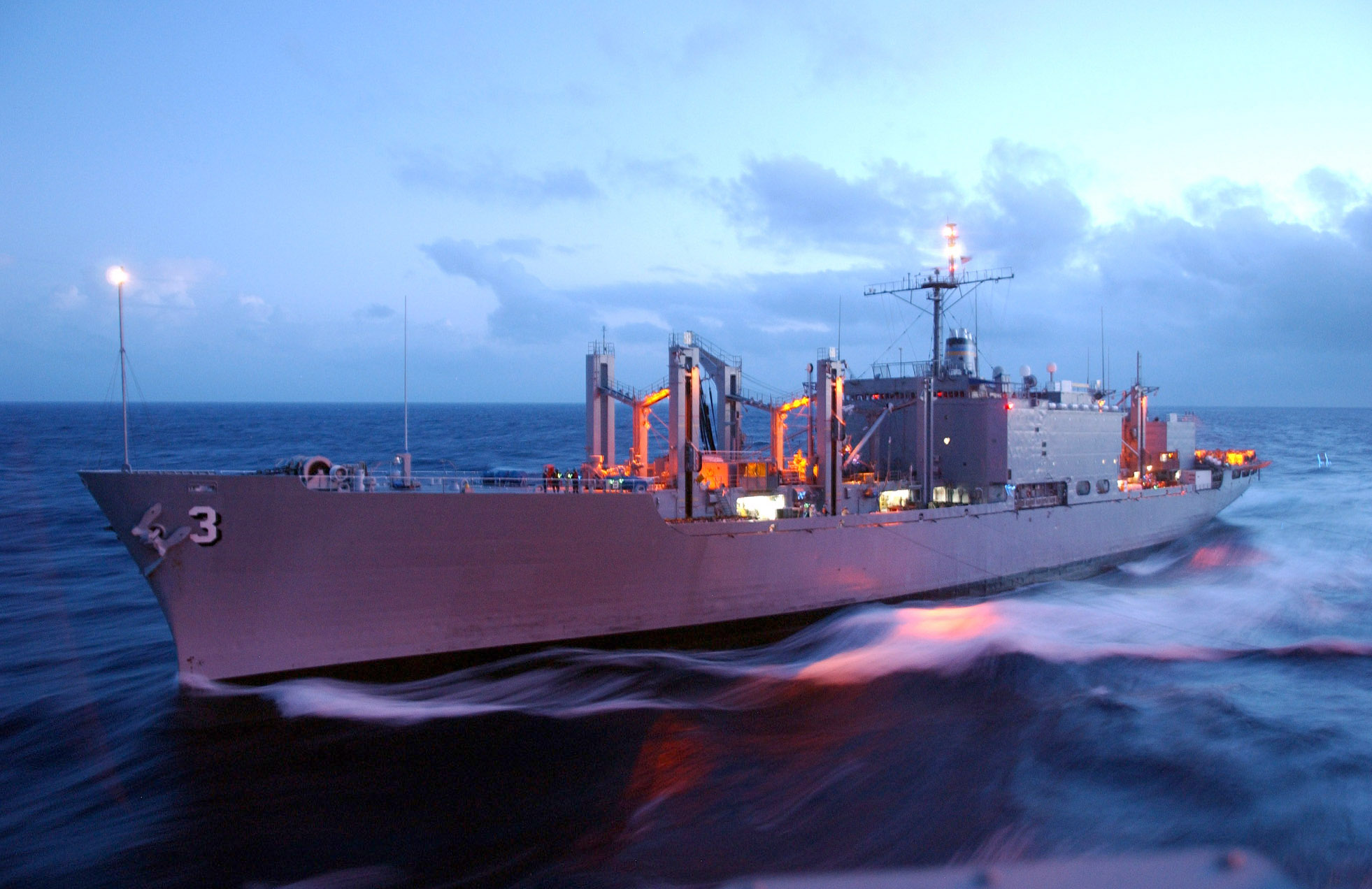
USNS Niagara Falls (T-AFS-3)

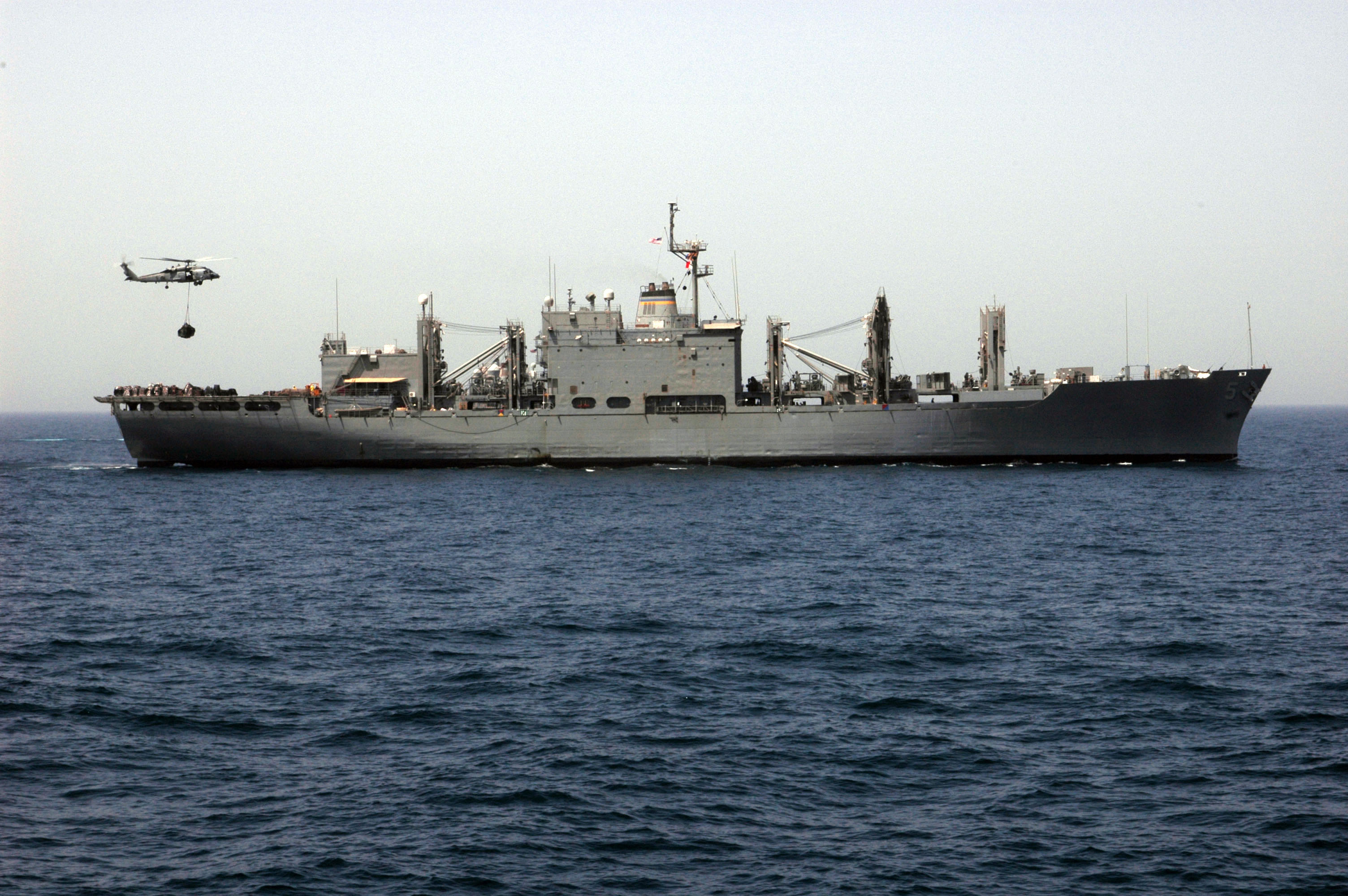
USNS Concord (T-AFS-5)

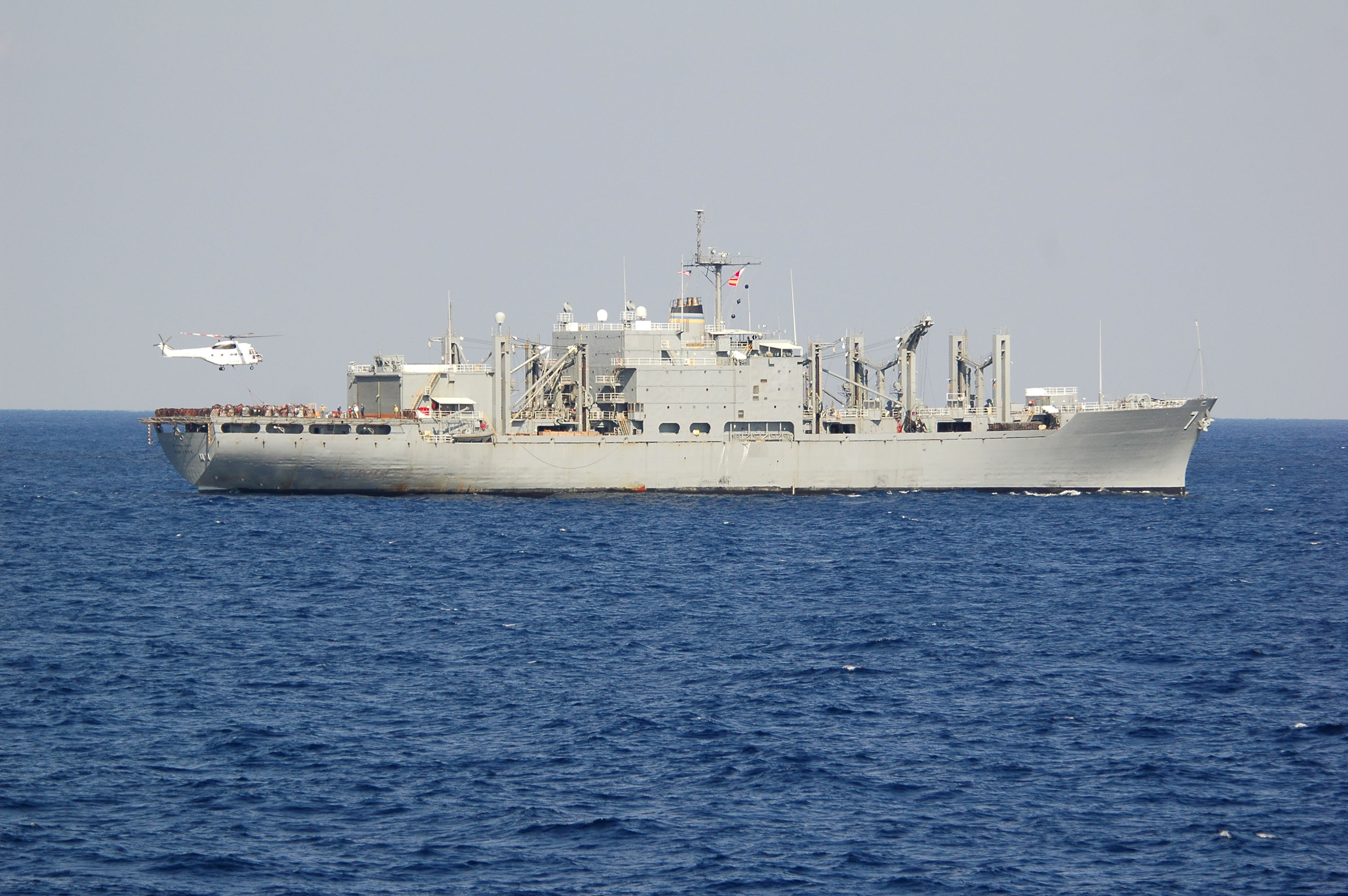
USNS San Jose (T-AFS-7)
