= USS San Diego (AFS-6) =

Cargo ship of the United States Navy

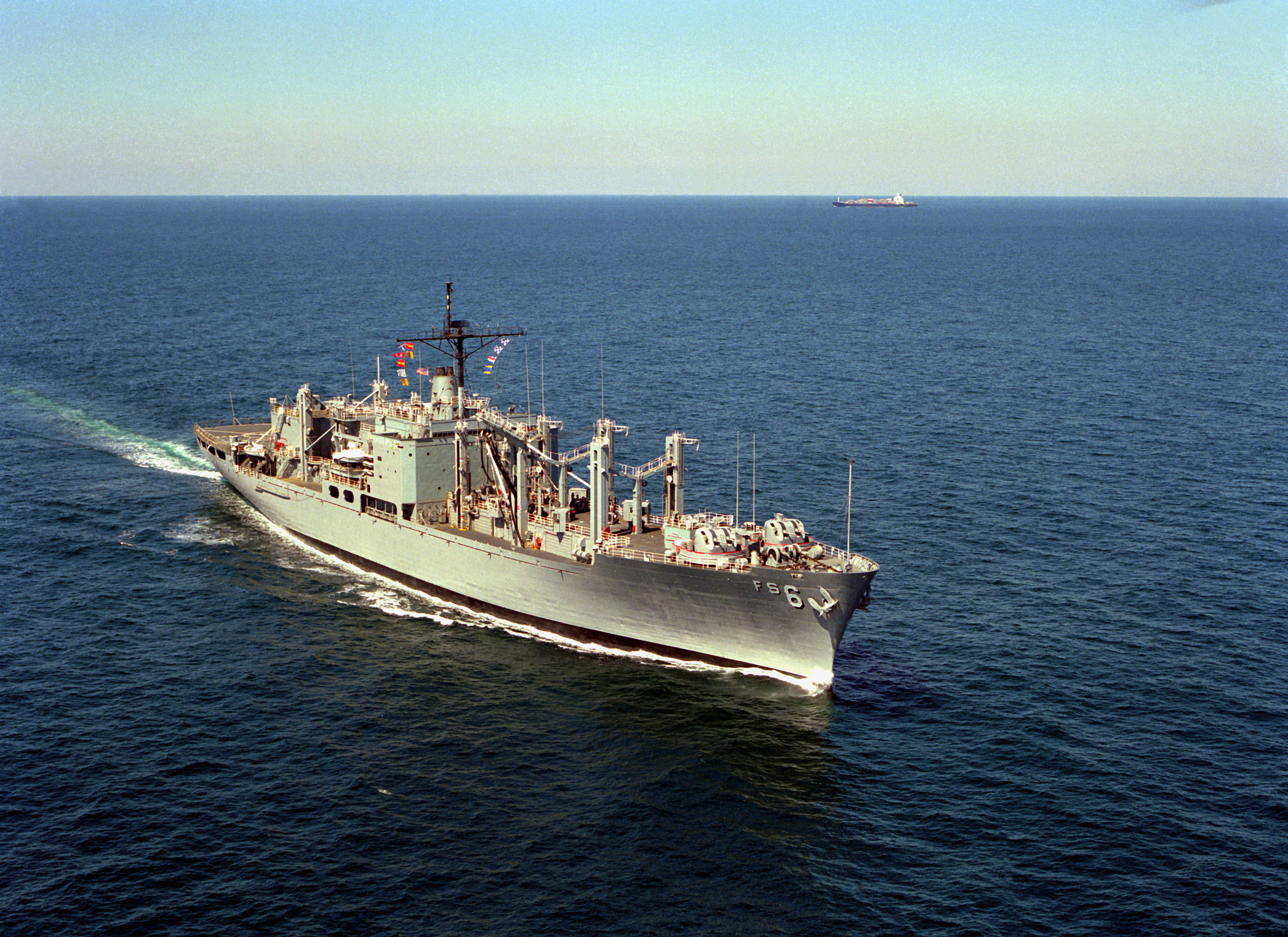
- USS San Diego (AFS-6) underway off Virginia in 1988

History

United States
- Name: USS San Diego (1969-1993); USNS San Diego (1993-1997)
- Namesake: San Diego, California
- Builder: National Steel and Shipbuilding Company, San Diego, California
- Laid down: 11 March 1967
- Launched: 13 April 1968
- Sponsored by: Mrs. Frank Curran
- Commissioned: 24 May 1969 as USS San Diego (AFS-6)
- Decommissioned: 11 August 1993
- In service: 11 August 1993 as USNS San Diego (T-AFS-6)
- Out of service: 10 December 1997
- Reclassified: USNS San Diego (T-AFS-6), 11 August 1993
- Stricken: 8 September 2003
- Honors and awards: Supply Efficiency "E", 1971
- Fate: Sold for scrapping 9 April 2006

General characteristics
- Type: Mars-class combat stores ship
- Displacement: 9,200 long tons (9,348 t) light; 15,900–18,663 long tons (16,155–18,962 t) full load
- Length: 581 ft (177 m)
- Beam: 79 ft (24 m)
- Draft: 27 ft (8.2 m) (max.)
- Propulsion: three 580psi Babcock & Wilcox boilers; one De Laval Turbine; single shaft
- Speed: 20 knots
- Complement: As Military Sealift Command ship (1993-1997): 49 U.S. Navy personnel, 125 civilian merchant seamen
- Armament: 4 × 3″/50 dual-purpose guns (2x2) Originally equipped with 6 x 3 in (76 mm) DP guns, Chaff Launchers, 4 × M240G 7.62×51mm medium machine guns or M249 5.56×45mm light MG, and 1 M2 12.7×99mm heavy machine gun when security detachment is embarked while in USN service. None in USNS Service
- Aircraft carried: two UH-46 helicopters

USS San Diego (AFS-6) was a Mars-class combat stores ship acquired by the U.S. Navy in 1968. She served the U.S. Atlantic Fleet until decommissioned in 1993. She then was redesignated as a United States Naval Ship, assigned to the Military Sealift Command, and served in a non-commissioned status with a mostly civilian crew as USNS San Diego (T-AFS-6) until 1997.

== Built in California ==
The third ship so named, San Diego was laid down on 11 March 1967 by the National Steel and Shipbuilding Company at San Diego, California; launched on 13 April 1968, sponsored by Mrs. Frank Curran; and commissioned on 24 May 1969.

== Operational history ==
After shakedown and refresher training in late 1969, San Diego began a seven-month, deployment to the Mediterranean in support of the United States Sixth Fleet. She returned to her home port, Norfolk, Virginia, and remained on the United States East Coast until February 1971, when she was selected to represent the United States Atlantic Fleet at the Mardi Gras celebration in New Orleans, Louisiana.

In April 1971, she deployed again to the Sixth Fleet and stayed in the Mediterranean until October 1971. During this tour of duty, she earned the Supply Efficiency "E," rescued sailors from a burning Greek freighter, and represented the Sixth Fleet at Admiral Farragut Day at Menorca in Spain's Balearic Islands.

On 27 July 1972, following more than nine months back in the United States operating and training along U.S,. East Coast, San Diego got underway to return to the Sixth Fleet. She arrived at Rota, Spain, on 4 August 1972 and relieved USS Sylvania (AFS-2) as the on-station combat stores ship with the Sixth Fleet. At the end of another six months of service in the Mediterranean, San Diego got underway to return to Norfolk in January 1973. She arrived on 26 January and resumed normal operations with the Atlantic Fleet.

San Diego operated out of Norfolk, along the U.S. East Coast, and in the Caribbean until late October 1973. At that time, she departed Norfolk for her fourth tour of duty in the Mediterranean. She arrived at Rota, Spain, on 4 November 1973. She cruised the Mediterranean with the Sixth Fleet for the next six months, getting underway from Rota on 19 April 1974 to return to Norfolk. San Diego reached Norfolk on 27 April 1974.

Between June 1974 and June 1976 San Diego made two more deployments to the Sixth Fleet and an additional excursion to Guantanamo Bay, Cuba, for refresher training.

During the three Mediterranean cruises from 1973 to 1976, USS San Diego stopped in ports from Lisbon, Portugal, to the Greek Island of Corfu, just off the coast of Albania. The easternmost port San Diego visited was Athens, and the only North African port she called at was Tunis, Tunisia. Palma de Mallorca and Naples, Italy were the ports she most frequented during those years.

On its next deployment to the Mediterranean Sea from October 1976 to March 1977, San Diego serviced task groups led by aircraft carriers USS Franklin D. Roosevelt (CV 42), USS John F. Kennedy (CV 67), USS Nimitz (CV 68) as well as the fleet Amphibious Task Group on a rotating basis, by Underway and Vertical Replenishment, and also provided in-port Vertical Replenishment to Sixth Fleet auxiliary forces docked at La Maddalena, Corsica and Souda Bay, Crete. The ship made port calls at Naples, Italy, Palma de Majorca, Livorno, Italy, Athens, Greece and Almeria, Spain. During the deployment San Diego's two embarked CH-46D helicopters from Helicopter Combat Support Squadron Six (HC-6) were involved in separate accidents during night Vertical Replenishment operations, and each was lost at sea.

On 17 January 1989, San Diego was involved in a collision with the submarine USS Norfolk (SSN-714) in the Thimble Shoal channel, as both vessels were headed to sea. While trying to pass San Diego, Norfolk delivered a glancing blow to the port side of San Diego. There were no injuries, but both vessels received minor damage. San Diego anchored for two days while her crewmen evaluated the damage, and then accomplished a restricted scope phased maintenance availability at Jonathan Corp., from 8 February to 16 March, followed by additional repairs in non-self-propelled medium auxiliary floating dry dock Sustain (AFDM-7), from 30 March to 10 April 1989.

== Transfer to Military Sealift Command ==
On 11 August 1993 San Diego was decommissioned, transferred to the U.S. Navy's Military Sealift Command, and placed in non-commissioned service as a United States Naval Ship with a mostly civilian crew as USNS San Diego (T-AFS-6).

[1993-1997]

San Diego continued in service until 10 December 1997 when she was laid up in Philadelphia, Pennsylvania.

== Disposal ==
San Diego was stricken from the Navy List on 10 December 1997 and she was sold for scrapping at Philadelphia on 9 April 2006.
