= USNS Sirius =

Cargo ship of the United States Navy

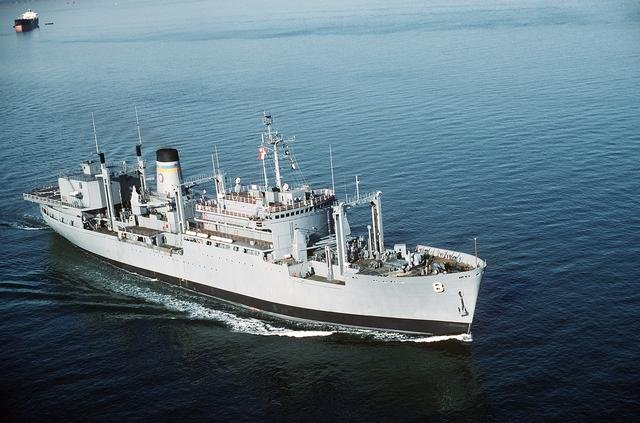
- Sirius (T-AFS-8) en route to Norfolk, VA. after her AFS conversion, 1983.

History

United Kingdom
- Name: RFA Lyness (A339)
- Namesake: Lyness, Scotland
- Builder: Swan, Hunter and Wigham Richardson
- Laid down: 1 April 1965
- Launched: 1 April 1966
- Commissioned: 22 December 1966
- Identification: IMO number: 6706888; Pennant number: A339
- Fate: Purchased by US, 1 January 1981

United States
- Name: USNS Sirius (T-AFS-8)
- Namesake: Sirius
- Acquired: 1 January 1981
- In service: 18 January 1981
- Out of service: 1 July 2005
- Stricken: 1 July 2005
- Identification: IMO number: 6706888
- Fate: Scrapped 2014

Flag of Texas
- Name: TS Texas Clipper III
- Namesake: Texas Clipper
- Acquired: 2005
- Identification: IMO number: 6706888

General characteristics
- Displacement: 16,680 t. (full load); 10,205 t. (light)
- Length: 523 ft (159 m) (overall)
- Beam: 72 ft (22 m)
- Draft: 26 ft (7.9 m)
- Propulsion: one diesel engine, 11,520 brake horsepower (8.6 MW), single propeller
- Speed: 18 knots (33 km/h)
- Complement: 123 Civilian, 30-47 Navy (USN service)
- Sensors & processing systems: Raytheon SHF navigation radar
- Armament: 8 pintle mounts, variable numbers of .50 BMG or 7.62×51mm machine guns (USN service)
- Aircraft carried: Two CH-46 Sea Knight, MH-60 Seahawk or Aerospatiale Super Puma helicopters (USN service)

USNS Sirius (T-AFS 8) was a Sirius-class combat stores ship of the United States Navy, named for Sirius (α Canis Majoris), the brightest star visible from Earth other than the Sun.

Sirius was built by Swan Hunter & Wigham Richardson for the Royal Navy. Laid down in 1965, she was launched in 1966 from Wallsend as RFA Lyness with the pennant A339 serving in the British Royal Fleet Auxiliary.

On 15 November 1980, the ship was acquired by charter by the United States Military Sealift Command. She was transferred to the U.S. Navy's Military Sealift Command in 1981.

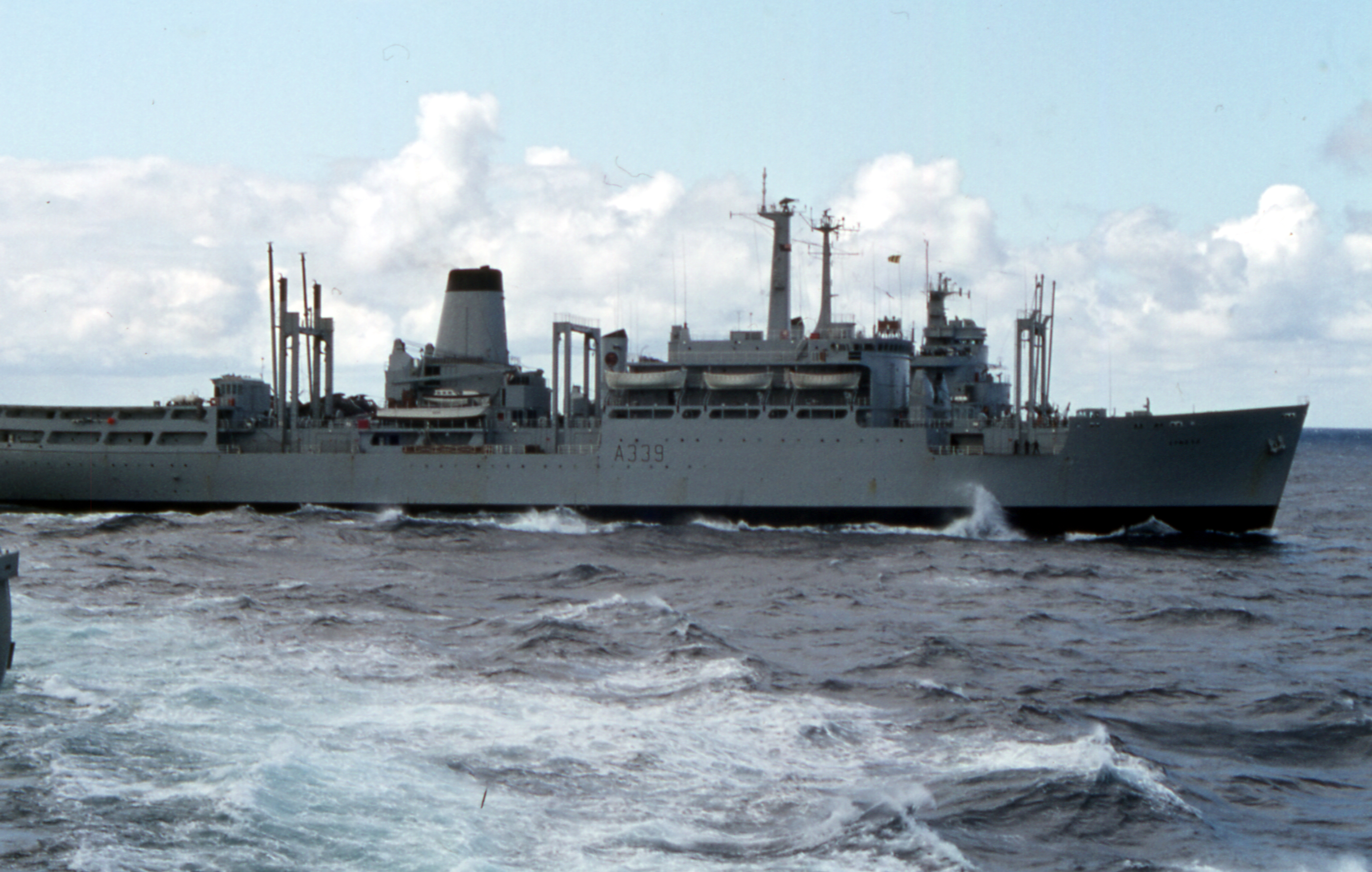
RFA Lyness (A 339) in PASSEX with HMS Intrepid and Deutschland (A 59) in Bay of Biscay, June 1980

Sirius was deactivated and struck from the Naval Vessel Register in 2005 and given to the U.S. Department of Transportation's Maritime Administration (MARAD), then assigned to Texas Maritime Academy under an agreement that it can be activated by MARAD at any time. During the fall of 2005, the Sirius served in New Orleans for Katrina relief, from 10 September until 29 November and at Lake Charles, LA for Rita relief until 2 March. Because of its extended relief effort the Sirius was unable to undergo a refit in 2006 to adapt its new role as a training vessel and comply with U.S. Coast Guard safety standards. Because the Sirius had not undergone a refit, it could not be formally commissioned as the USTS Texas Clipper III nor could it be used for summer training cruises. In the winter of 2009 the US Coast Guard ruled that the Sirius was unfit for training and was prepared for decommissioning while the school looked for a new training ship. On 25 June 2009, the Sirius was returned to the U.S. Maritime Administration.

Sirius was scrapped at Brownsville on 30 May 2014.

== Honors and awards ==
The USNS Sirius is authorized the following awards:
