= USNS Spica =

Cargo ship of the United States Navy

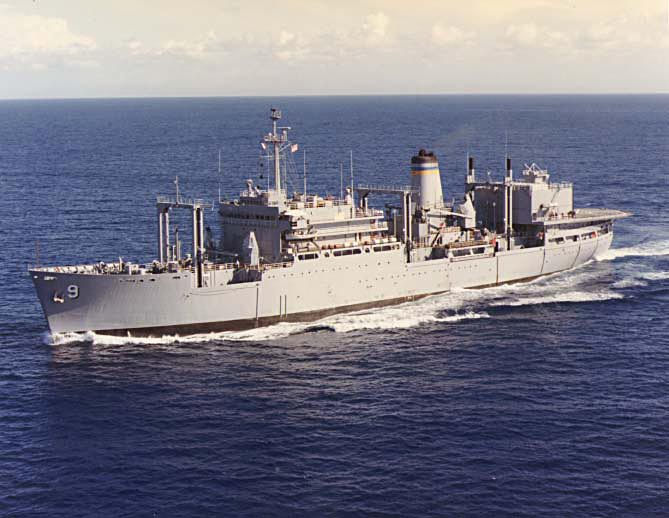

History

United States
- Name: USNS Spica
- Ordered: For the Royal Navy as RFA Tarbatness (A-345)
- Builder: Swan Hunter & Wigham Richardson Ltd., Wallsend-On-Tyne
- Laid down: 1 April 1965
- Launched: 1 February 1967
- Acquired: Purchased by the U.S. Navy, 1 November 1981
- In service: 1 November 1981, as USNS Spica (T-AFS-9)
- Out of service: 26 January 2008
- Identification: IMO number: 6709933
- Honors and awards: Navy Meritorious Unit Commendation
- Fate: Sunk as target 6 May 2009

General characteristics
- Class & type: Sirius-class combat stores ship
- Tonnage: 6475 deadweight tonnage
- Displacement: 10,205 tons light, 16,680 tons full load
- Length: 523 ft (159 m) o/a
- Beam: 72 ft (22 m)
- Draft: 26 ft (7.9 m) (max.)
- Propulsion: 1 × diesel engine, 11,520 bhp (8,590 kW), single propeller
- Speed: 18 knots (33 km/h)
- Complement: 123 Civilian, 47 Navy
- Armament: None
- Aircraft carried: 2 × UH-46 Sea Knight helicopters

USNS Spica (T-AFS-9), was a combat stores ship acquired by the U.S. Navy from the United Kingdom in 1981. She participated in Operation Fiery Vigil to evacuate Clark Air Base personnel following the Mount Pinatubo Eruption in 1991. She served as part of the Military Sealift Command until she was deactivated in 2008.

Before her U.S. Navy career, Spica served the United Kingdom's Royal Fleet Auxiliary as RFA Tarbatness (A345).

== Built in England ==
RFA Tarbatness (A345) was built at Swan Hunter & Wigham Richardson Ltd., Wallsend-On-Tyne, England, for the Royal Fleet Auxiliary. She was laid down on 1 April 1965 and was launched on 1 February 1967.

== Purchased by the U.S. Navy ==
Spica was purchased by the U.S. Navy and placed into non-commissioned service as a combat stores ship on 1 November 1981 as the USNS Spica (T-AFS-9), a unit of the Military Sealift Command (MSC) Naval Auxiliary Force Atlantic.

== Mission ==
Spica’s mission was to provide underway replenishment in support of naval forces by providing refrigerated supplies, dry supplies, spare parts, general supplies, fleet freight, mail, and replacement personnel by alongside or by vertical replenishment processes.

== Honors and awards ==
Spica was authorized the following awards:

== Disposal ==
Spica was inactivated on 26 January 2008 and turned over to the Inactive Ship Maintenance Facility at Philadelphia, Pennsylvania, for disposal. She was sunk as a target on 6 May 2009.
