= USS White Plains (AFS-4) =

Cargo ship of the United States Navy

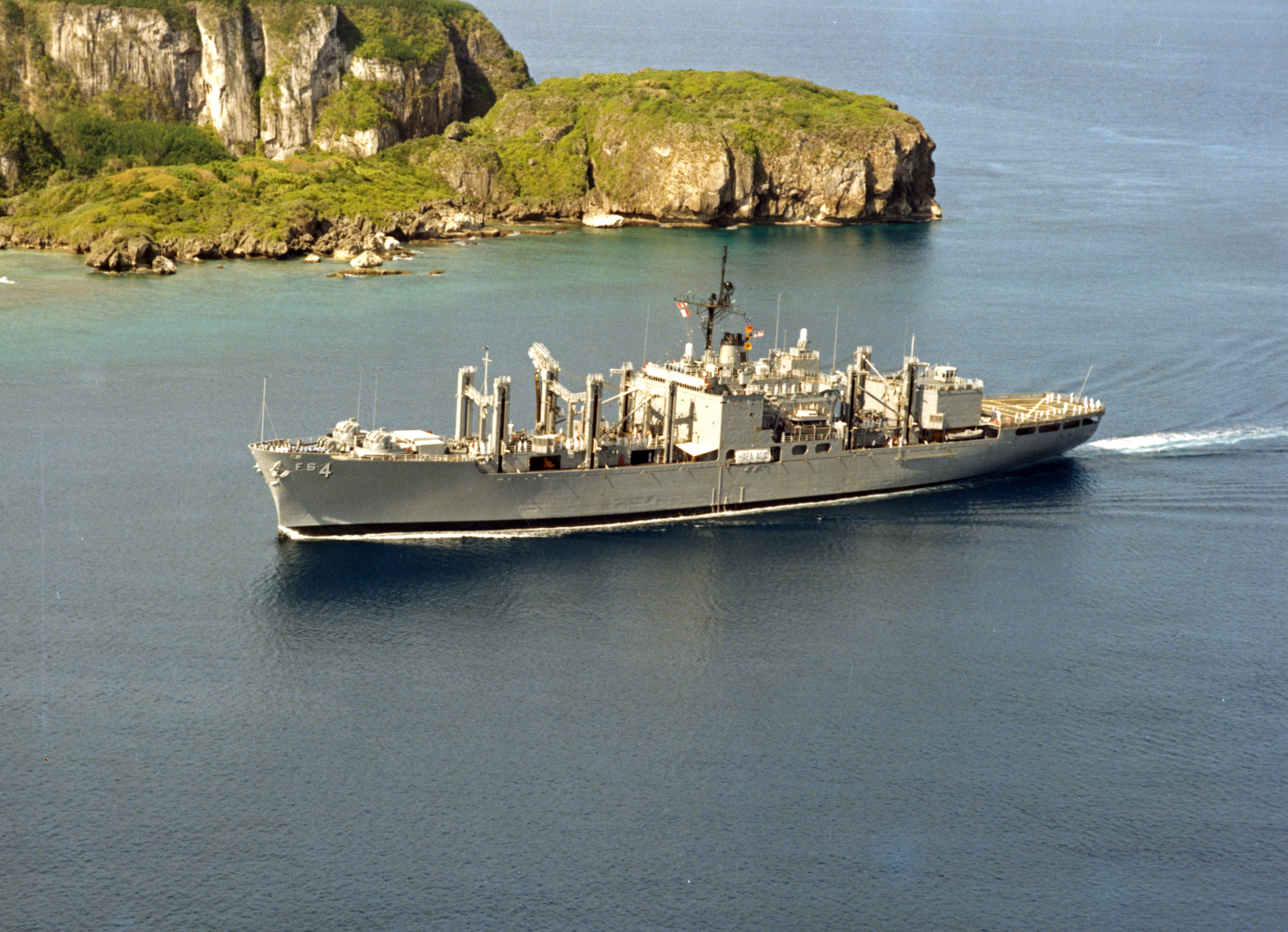
- White Plains in 1984

History

United States
- Name: USS White Plains
- Namesake: White Plains, New York
- Builder: National Steel and Shipbuilding Company, San Diego
- Laid down: 2 October 1965
- Launched: 26 July 1966
- Sponsored by: Mrs. Bob Wilson
- Commissioned: 23 November 1968
- Decommissioned: 17 April 1995
- Stricken: 24 August 1995
- Nickname(s): "The Orient Express"
- Fate: Sunk as target 8 July 2002

General characteristics
- Class & type: Mars-class combat stores ship
- Displacement: 17,500 long tons (17,781 t) full load
- Length: 581 ft (177.1 m)
- Beam: 79 ft (24.1 m)
- Draft: 25 ft (7.6 m)
- Propulsion: 3 × Babcock & Wilcox boilers, 580 psi (3.7 MPa), 825 °F (440 °C); 1 × De Laval turbine, 1 shaft
- Speed: 21 knots (39 km/h; 24 mph)
- Complement: 42 Commissioned officers and 445 enlisted personnel
- Armament: 4 × 3-inch/50-caliber guns (2×2) (originally 6); Chaff launchers; 4 × M240G 7.62×51mm medium machine guns or M249 5.56×45mm light MG; 1 × M2 12.7×99mm heavy machine gun when security detachment is embarked; 2 × Vulcan Phalanx CIWS
- Aircraft carried: 2 × CH-46 Sea Knight helicopters

USS White Plains (AFS-4) was a Mars-class combat stores ship in service with the United States Navy from 1968 to 1995. She was sunk as a target in 2002.

== Construction and commissioning ==
White Plains was named after the city of White Plains, New York, scene of the Battle of White Plains during the American Revolutionary War. The ship was laid down on 2 October 1965 by the National Steel and Shipbuilding Company in San Diego. She was launched on 26 July 1966, sponsored by Mrs. Bob Wilson, and commissioned at the Long Beach Naval Shipyard at Long Beach, California, on 23 November 1968.

== Service history ==
=== 1960s ===
The combat stores ship spent the first nine months of her commissioned service engaged in a series of routine post-commissioning activities in California waters. In February 1969, she went through a series of qualification trials in preparation for her final contract trials which she passed successfully in mid-March. Shakedown training followed in April, and post-shakedown availability at the Hunters Point Naval Shipyard, San Francisco occupied her time during the last half of May and the first three weeks of June. During the second week in July, the ship participated in her first fleet exercise, Operation "Beagle Baron". She spent the last half of the month making preparations for her first deployment to the Western Pacific. On 20 August, White Plains stood out of San Francisco Bay and shaped a course for the Far East. On 3 September, she reached her first port of call, Yokosuka. While in Japan, she also visited Sasebo before getting underway on 16 September for Naval Station Subic Bay and thence to the Vietnam combat zone. After topping off her replenishment cargo at Subic Bay, the ship arrived in Vietnamese waters on 23 September. There, she cruised for 14 days engaged in underway replenishment operations with warships of the United States Seventh Fleet on station off the coast. The deployment lasted for another four months during which she made three more replenishment cruises in the combat zone along the Vietnamese coast.

=== 1970s ===
On 11 February 1970, White Plains departed Subic Bay on her way home. She stopped at Pearl Harbor near the end of the month and arrived in San Francisco on 5 March. The combat stores ship remained in the United States only three months. During that time, she took the normal post-deployment standdown break, underwent a restricted availability, and conducted refresher and type training. On 10 July, she headed back to the Western Pacific for her second tour of duty in the Vietnam conflict. She reported for duty with the 7th Fleet on 22 July and, between that time and early December, made five different replenishment cruises in the combat zone. On 8 December, the ship departed Yokosuka, Japan, to return to the United States. She arrived back in San Francisco on 18 December and immediately commenced post-deployment standdown. On 15 April 1971, she began her first regular overhaul at Hunters Point Naval Shipyard, and it occupied her until 8 July when she put to sea for post-overhaul trials. Type and refresher training took up the remainder of July as well as August and September. In October, she began preparations for her third deployment to the Western Pacific.

On 20 November, White Plains stood out of San Francisco Bay on her way to the Far East and, after a two-week voyage, arrived in Subic Bay on 7 December. Again, she made a series of replenishment cruises in the Vietnam combat zone and punctuated them with visits to such ports as Hong Kong, Singapore, Sattahip district, Thailand, Kaohsiung, Taiwan and Subic Bay. She remained in the Far East for over seven months and conducted 10 replenishment cruises to Vietnamese waters. On 8 July 1972, White Plains departed Sasebo, Japan, and shaped a course for home. She arrived at Oakland, California, on 19 July and remained there until 5 September at which time she moved to Alameda, California for a restricted availability at Todd Shipyards. The ship completed repairs on 3 October and began preparations to return to the Western Pacific. On 31 October, the combat stores ship got underway from Alameda and set a westerly course. After a two-week voyage, she entered her new home port, Sasebo, on 13 November. There, she immediately began another restricted availability, this time for conversion of her propulsion system to the use of Navy distillate fuel. That conversion took up the remainder of 1972 and the first 15 days of 1973.

White Plains return coincided with the end of American involvement in the Vietnam War; however, that did not signal an end to duty in Vietnamese waters. Through the first seven months of 1973, she continued to make replenishment cruises in the former combat zone to bring stores to the U.S. Navy ships engaged in Operation "End Sweep", the taking up of mines planted by the U.S. Navy in North Vietnamese waters during the war. "End Sweep" came to a conclusion late in July, and White Plains began real peacetime duty at that point. For the next two years, she operated out of Sasebo making periodic voyages to provide supplies to units of the 7th Fleet at sea. She also made the usual port calls throughout the Orient and participated in training exercises, notably with units of the Republic of Korea Navy in November 1974 and January 1975. On 1 August 1975, she changed home ports from Sasebo to Yokosuka and, on 5 September, began regular overhaul at her new base of operations. That repair period lasted until 15 April 1976 at which time she resumed her replenishment duty with the 7th Fleet.

The year 1976 proved a very active one for White Plains. In addition to her normal duty supplying the 7th Fleet, she joined in three non-routine operations. Late in May and early in June, she voyaged to the Mariana Islands where Typhoon Pamela had just wreaked so much havoc. The ship carried supplies to the relief of the storm-battered island of Guam. During the second week of July, she interrupted her normal routine again, this time to rush to the Indian Ocean, via Subic Bay, to resupply the carrier contingency force sent to patrol the eastern coast of Africa during the flare-up between Kenya and Uganda. She remained in the Indian Ocean until 5 August whereupon she headed back to Yokosuka to resume her normal support duties with the 7th Fleet. On 27 September, she departed Yokosuka for another special mission. During the next five weeks, she sailed to Australia, participated in the bilateral amphibious and antisubmarine exercise Operation "Kangaroo II", visited the Australian port of Townsville, and then returned to Yokosuka. She arrived back in her home port on 11 November and resumed her duties keeping the fleet units supplied. White Plains continued to make replenishment swings from Yokosuka to 7th Fleet units operating in such diverse places as the Philippine Sea, the South China Sea, and the Sea of Japan. In late October and early November 1977, the ship voyaged to the Indian Ocean again to replenish American warships engaged in Operation "Midlink". Upon concluding that mission, she returned to Yokosuka and resumed her replenishment duties out of that port.

In 1978, White Plains was struck by USS Mount Vernon during an underway replenishment operation. During the same year, the ship lost power and propulsion in the Strait of Malacca while being followed by a supertanker, but collision was avoided.

=== 1980s ===
White Plains was used as the trial vessel for the class to mount the two Vulcan Phalanx CIWS. The ship retained the Phalanx systems after decision was made not to mount them on the rest of the class. In the late 1980s, the ship was one of the first U.S. Navy ships to have women sailors aboard, the first were Boeing Vertol CH-46 pilots from Helicopter Combat Support Squadron 5 (HC-5). By 1991, and after a berthing retrofit accomplished in overhaul, the ship had a complement of both female officers and enlisted aboard.

On 9 May 1989, while underway in the South China Sea en route from Hong Kong to her homeport of Guam, White Plains experienced a major Class Bravo fire in the main engine room while conducting fueling at sea with the fast combat support ship USS Sacramento (AOE-1). The fire resulted from the ejection of a valve stem on the fuel transfer system which sent a high-pressure spray of fuel onto the back of a firing boiler that consequently ignited into a fireball. There were 6 fatalities and 161 injuries reported as a result of the fire. The cause of the valve stem ejection was a failure to follow proper tag-out procedures, a partially disassembled butterfly valve, poor validation of the fuel transfer checklist, and subsequent pressurization of the fuel line containing the valve. White Plains was towed Subic Bay by USNS Narragansett for preliminary repairs and returned to Guam approximately three months later.

=== 1990s ===
White Plains next deployed to the western Pacific, Indian Ocean, and Persian Gulf in July–November 1990. In early August 1992, the ship received an extensive refit, including her main steam plant, at Ship Repair Facility (SRF) Guam. Later that same month, since the ship was unable to get underway on its own power, its mooring lines were reinforced with anchor chain and steel cables to keep it moored to the pier as Typhoon Omar approached Guam. On 27 August 1992, under the command of Capt. Robin Y. Weber, the ship weathered the initial pass of the eyewall of Omar over Apra Harbor. After a relative calm and then the second pass of the eyewall, White Plains was torn from her moorings by the 150 mph winds and ultimately ran aground on the coral beach near Polaris Point.

At the beginning of the repair availability, the ship's First Lieutenant met with SRF Guam engineers and developed a plan to moor the ship in the event of a typhoon. The plan took into account the surface area of exposed portions of the ship and pounds per square inch of expected force generated by typhoon winds along with the strength of pier cleats, bollards and deadmen. The plan required more lines than were a part of the ship's normal complement. An agreement was reached about which lines would be provided by the ship and which would be provided by the SRF. All lines were to be of nylon construction. On the morning of the storm's approach, SRF riggers used springlay mooring lines. Springlay is a combination of wire and synthetic fiber and does not stretch. Nylon mooring lines can stretch up to a third of their length with no damage to the line. Despite the First Lieutenant's protest of the incompatibility of the two types of mooring lines, the SRF's riggers claimed they had no other lines available. This resulted in the springlay mooring lines holding almost the full force of the winds while the strength of the nylon mooring lines was not fully utilized. The springlay lines gave way followed by the nylon lines. In the weeks following Typhoon Omar, the eyes of two other typhoons passed over the ship while still in the SRF. During these events, the original mooring plan was utilized using all nylon mooring lines and the ship rode out both typhoons with no problems.

Very fortunate to have run aground near Polaris Point, after the ship left the pier in the storm, the ship lost its only power source for a day, a notoriously fickle emergency diesel generator. The generator situation was corrected after several hours and troubleshooting, and ultimately solved by a simple observation made by the Electrical Officer, LTJG Lee, that a control governor mechanical linkage was undone. Essential power for emergency services were restored to the ship, enabling the crew to handle any flooding or fire that would occur. While the ship was aground for 3–5 days, the crew subsisted on MREs, and helped plan, along with harbor operations, for her ungrounding. There was no real damage to the ship's hull. The ship was underway, again, for Gulf operations in May 1993.

=== Decommissioning and fate ===
White Plains was decommissioned on 17 April 1995 and was finally sunk as a target in the Pacific Ocean at 22°55′00.9″N 160°10′00.3″W, during the RIMPAC 02 exercise in waters 2,570 fathoms (15,420 feet; 4,700 meters) deep.

== Unit awards ==
White Plains earned the following awards, including:

- Navy Unit Commendation (2nd)
- Meritorious Unit Commendation (3rd)
- Navy E ribbon (6th award)
- Navy Expeditionary Medal (5th)
- National Defense Service Medal (2nd)
- Armed Forces Expeditionary Medal (2nd)
- Vietnam Service Medal (5 service stars)
- Southwest Asia Service Medal
- Humanitarian Service Medal (6th)
- Vietnam Campaign Medal
