= USS Mars (AFS-1) =

Cargo ship of the United States Navy

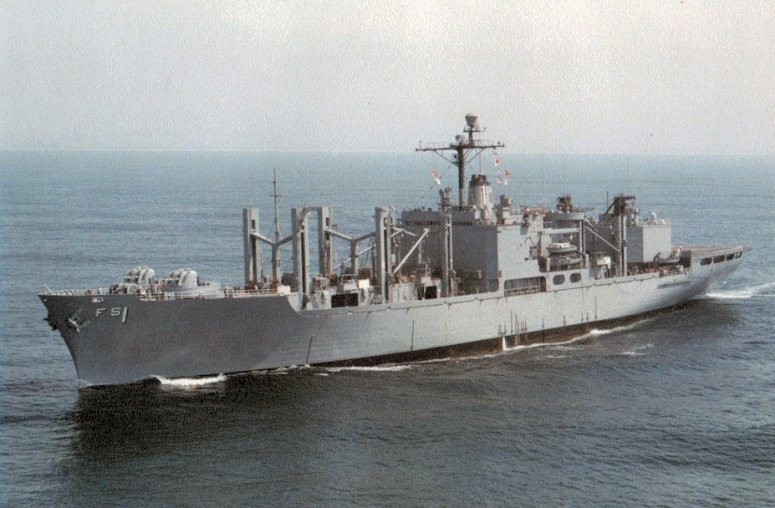
- USS Mars (AFS-1)

History

United States
- Name: USS Mars
- Namesake: The borough of Mars in Butler County, Pennsylvania
- Builder: National Steel and Shipbuilding Company, San Diego, California
- Laid down: 5 May 1962
- Launched: 15 June 1963
- Commissioned: 1 December 1963
- Decommissioned: 19 February 1998
- Stricken: 24 May 2004
- Honors and awards: Navy Unit Commendation and 11 campaign stars (Vietnam)
- Fate: Sunk as a target, 15 July 2006

General characteristics
- Class & type: Mars-class combat stores ship
- Displacement: 9,200 long tons (9,300 t) (light); 15,900–18,663 long tons (16,155–18,962 t) (full load)
- Length: 581 ft (177 m)
- Beam: 79 ft (24 m)
- Draft: 27 ft (8.2 m)
- Propulsion: 1 × steam turbine; 1 × shaft
- Speed: 20 kn (23 mph; 37 km/h)
- Complement: 486
- Armament: 4 × 3"/50 caliber guns (2x2) (originally 6); Chaff launchers; 4 × M240G 7.62×51 mm or M249 5.56×45 mm general purpose machine guns; 1 M2 12.7×99 mm heavy machine gun when security detachment is embarked
- Aircraft carried: 2 × CH-46 Sea Knight helicopters

USS Mars (AFS‑1), the third United States Navy ship to bear the name, was laid down by the National Steel and Shipbuilding Company in San Diego, California, on 5 May 1962. She was launched on 15 June 1963. She was sponsored by Mrs. Clyde Doyle, widow of Representative Clyde Doyle of California and commissioned at Long Beach Naval Shipyard on 21 December 1963.

Mars was the first of a new class that was intended to replace three types of supply ships: the AF (Refrigerated Stores Ship), AKS (Stores Issue Ship), and AVS (Aviation Supply Ship). Two particular innovations were the ability to support CH-46/HH-46/UH‑46 helicopters helicopter transfer operations and an automatic highline shuttle transfer system to make a rapid transfer of supplies possible. She was the first to make night vertical replenishments. To speed inventory management and replenishment processing, Mars became the first ship in the Pacific Fleet to be equipped with a UNIVAC 1104 computer system.

== Service history ==
=== 1963–1970 ===
Assigned to Service Squadron 1 (ServRon 1), Mars left San Diego on 16 March 1964 for Acapulco, Mexico, for shakedown, returning to San Diego on Easter Sunday. On 1 September she departed for the western Pacific, arriving at Yokosuka, Japan, on the 23rd. With Yokosuka as home port, the combat storeship operated from the Philippines to the South China Sea through the rest of the year.

Mars continued through the next three years to provide logistic support to the far-ranging 7th Fleet at sea, especially off Vietnam, while revisiting the South Pacific ports of Hong Kong; Sasebo, Japan; and Subic Bay, Philippines. Typical of the combat storeship's supply activities was a night vertical replenishment of USS Canberra while the heavy cruiser was fighting off Vietnam, her 8 in (200 mm) guns on the engaged side fired in support of troops ashore. Mars had taken an especially active part in similar operations in South Vietnam. She set several replenishment records in 1967 and 1968, and into 1969 continued to play an important role in the fleet operations in the Southeast Asia area. In January 1968, Mars sailed to the waters off North Korea as part of the support fleet for Operation Formation Star when the USS Pueblo was seized by North Korea.

=== 1971–1979 ===
She underwent extensive overhaul at the Willamette Iron and Steel Company shipyard in Richmond, CA, from late August 1971-April 1972, receiving naval distillate fuel burning boilers, upgraded electronics, etc. She was then immediately deployed to the South China Sea to support the 7th Fleet and Marine Amphibious forces after the North Vietnamese Easter Offensive. She returned to her homeport of Alameda, California, that December; her homeport was then moved to Sasebo, Japan during April 1973. From April 1973 to the end of 1974, Mars continued replenishing the ships of the western Pacific and made two trips to the Indian Ocean to support the U.S. Navy patrolling the Persian Gulf area. She was transferred back to CONUS in August, 1976, arriving at Oakland Army Depot.

On 14 May 1979, USS Cook and Mars collided off Point Loma near San Diego, California, injuring seven.

=== 1980–1988 ===
Mars departed its homeport of Alameda, California in February, 1980, transited the Pacific, and arrived in the Indian Ocean in May. One of her first assignments was to send a working party ashore on the island of Masirah off the coast of Oman to clear the area of the debris left at the staging point for the attempted rescue of the embassy hostages in Tehran, Iran. Once this task was complete, Mars stayed in the Indian Ocean, conducting underway replenishments with the battle groups assigned, steaming to Diego Garcia to be re-supplied, and conducting re-supply evolutions on Masirah. The State Department had negotiated a specific window of 0900-1300 for the U.S. Air Force to land a C-141 cargo plane so Mars personnel could unload it and transfer it to the Mars via its CH-46 helicopters. Mars arrived back in Alameda in November to begin preparations for her next deployment in January 1982. In 1987, Mars was to make a circumnavigation voyage from her homeport in Oakland, CA however upon reaching the Philippines, orders were changed to remain in the North Arabian Sea to replenish Carrier Task Force ships after Iran publicized the deployment of Silkworm Missiles at the entrance to the Persian Gulf. Mars continued to make WestPac and Indian Ocean deployments from Naval Supply Center, Oakland then from its forward-deployed home of Sasebo Japan until its transfer to the Military Sealift Command in 1993.

=== 1989–2006 ===
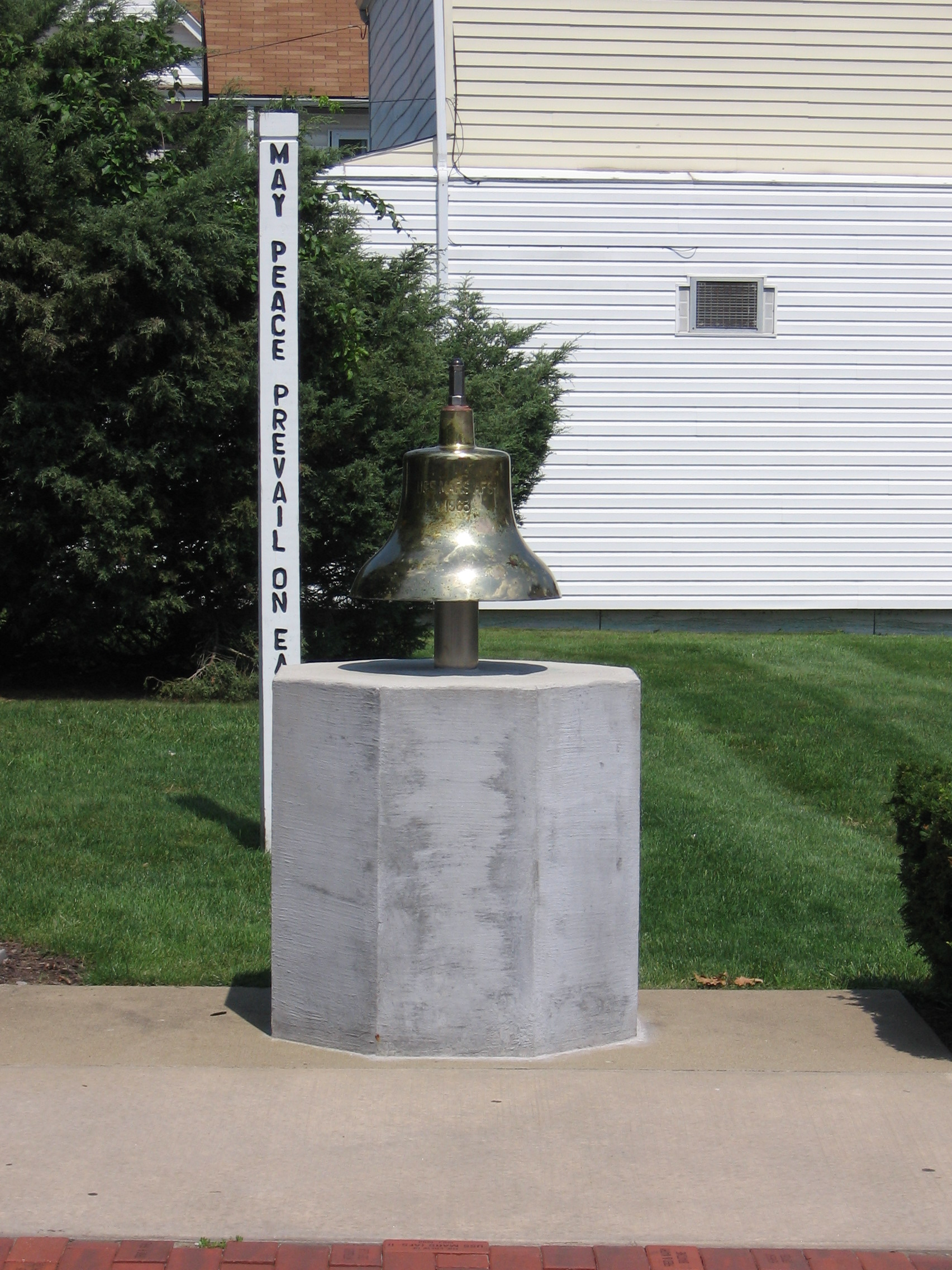
The bell of the Mars in Mars, Pennsylvania

Mars participated in PACEX '89 with port visits to Dutch Harbor, Alaska, Pusan, Korea, Yokosuka, Japan and Pearl Harbor, Hawaii.

Mars was decommissioned from naval service on 1 February 1993, at Naval Station Treasure Island, San Francisco, CA, and was placed in service by the Military Sealift Command (MSC) as USNS Mars (T-AFS-1).

On 19 February 1998, Mars was placed out of service by the Military Sealift Command and laid up in the Pacific Reserve Fleet, Naval Inactive Ship Maintenance Facility, Pearl Harbor, Hawaii, (Maintenance Category "B").

Mars was struck from the Naval Register on 24 May 2004, and retained as a logistics support asset (Maintenance category "L") at Pearl Harbor.

Mars final disposition was as a torpedo target during RIMPAC 2006 exercises. She was sunk off Hawaii on 15 July 2006. Mars rests in 2,750 fathoms (5,030 m) of water some 54 nmi (62 mi; 100 km) from the coast.

Mars received the Navy Unit Commendation and eleven campaign stars for Vietnam War service.

In April 2006, the bell of Mars was donated to the small borough of Mars, Pennsylvania as a memorial. The ship was named after the Western Pennsylvania community. U.S. Senator Rick Santorum, and former crew members were present at the ceremony, and helped to dedicate the large brass bell to the ship's namesake.

== Honors and awards ==
The USS Mars is authorized the following awards:
