= USNS Concord =

Cargo ship of the United States Navy

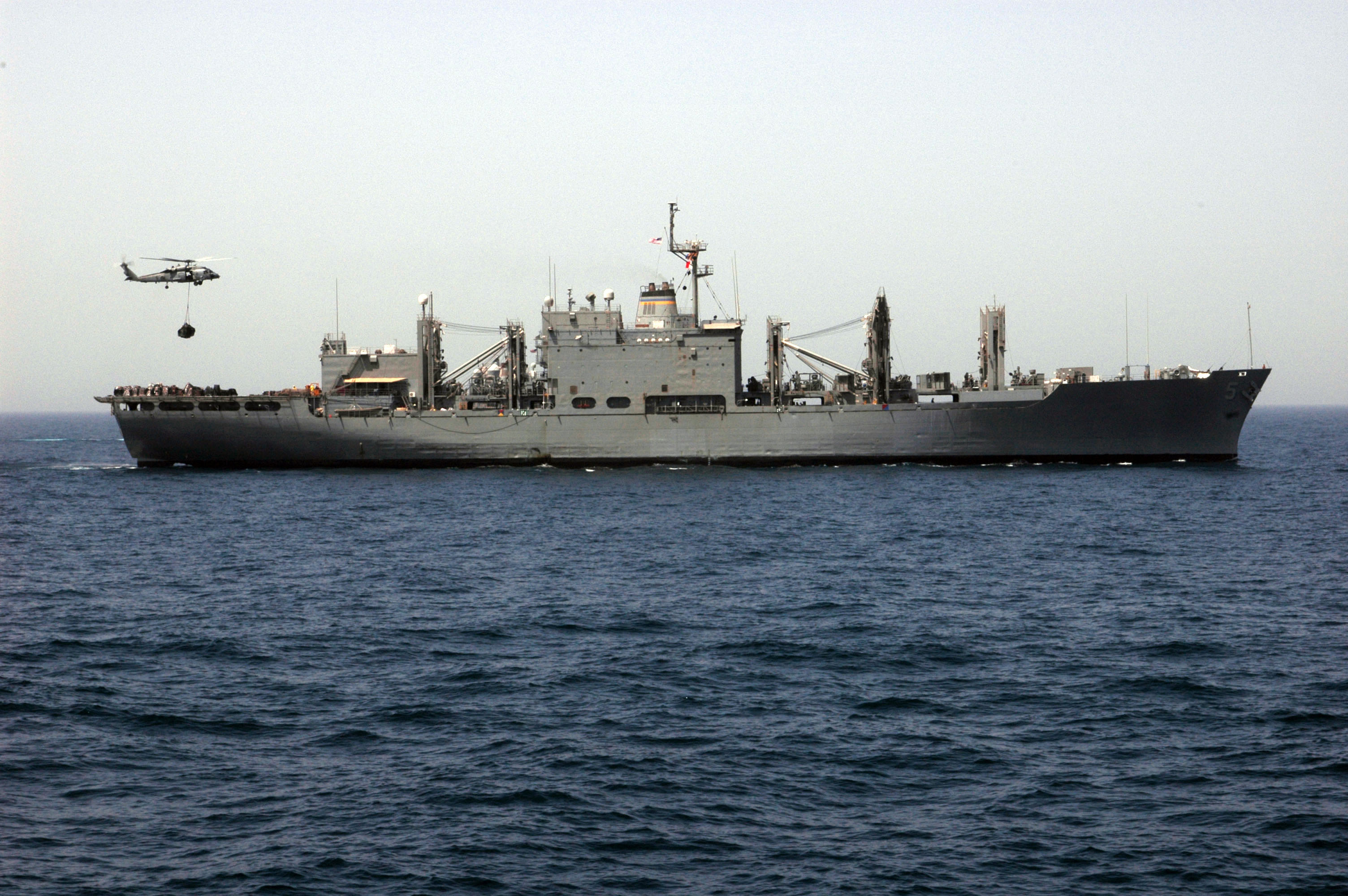
- USNS Concord (T-AFS-5), June 2007

History

United States
- Name: Concord
- Namesake: Concord, Massachusetts, location of the Battle of Concord
- Ordered: 18 December 1964
- Builder: National Steel and Shipbuilding Company
- Laid down: 26 March 1966
- Launched: 17 December 1966
- Acquired: 21 November 1968
- Commissioned: 17 November 1968 as USS Concord (AFS-5)
- Decommissioned: 15 October 1992
- In service: 15 October 1992
- Out of service: 18 August 2009
- Reclassified: USNS Concord (T-AFS-5)
- Stricken: 18 August 2009
- Fate: Sunk as a target, 17 July 2012

General characteristics
- Class & type: Mars class combat stores ship
- Displacement: 9,200 tons (light) 15,900-18,663 tons (full)
- Length: 581 ft (177 m)
- Beam: 79 ft (24 m)
- Draft: 27 ft (8.2 m)
- Propulsion: 3 × 580psi Babcock & Wilcox boilers, one De Laval turbine, single shaft
- Speed: 20 knots
- Complement: Officers: 48; enlisted: 441
- Armament: 2 × twin 3 in (76 mm) gun mounts
- Armor: 3.15 in
- Aircraft carried: 2 × UH-46 Sea Knight helicopters

USS Concord (AFS-5), was a Mars-class combat stores ship, in service with the United States Navy from 1968 to 1992. Concord became the first of five ships of its class to be transferred to Military Sealift Command. The transfer was completed in October 1992 and she was redesignated USNS Concord (T-AFS-5). Concord was stricken in August 2009 and sunk as a target in 2012.

== History ==
Concord was laid down on 26 March 1966 at the National Steel and Shipbuilding Company in San Diego, California. The ship was launched on 17 December 1966 and commissioned on 27 November 1968. On 18 August 1992, Concord was decommissioned and transferred to Military Sealift Command, and assigned to the Naval Fleet Auxiliary Force (PM1), MSC Far East.

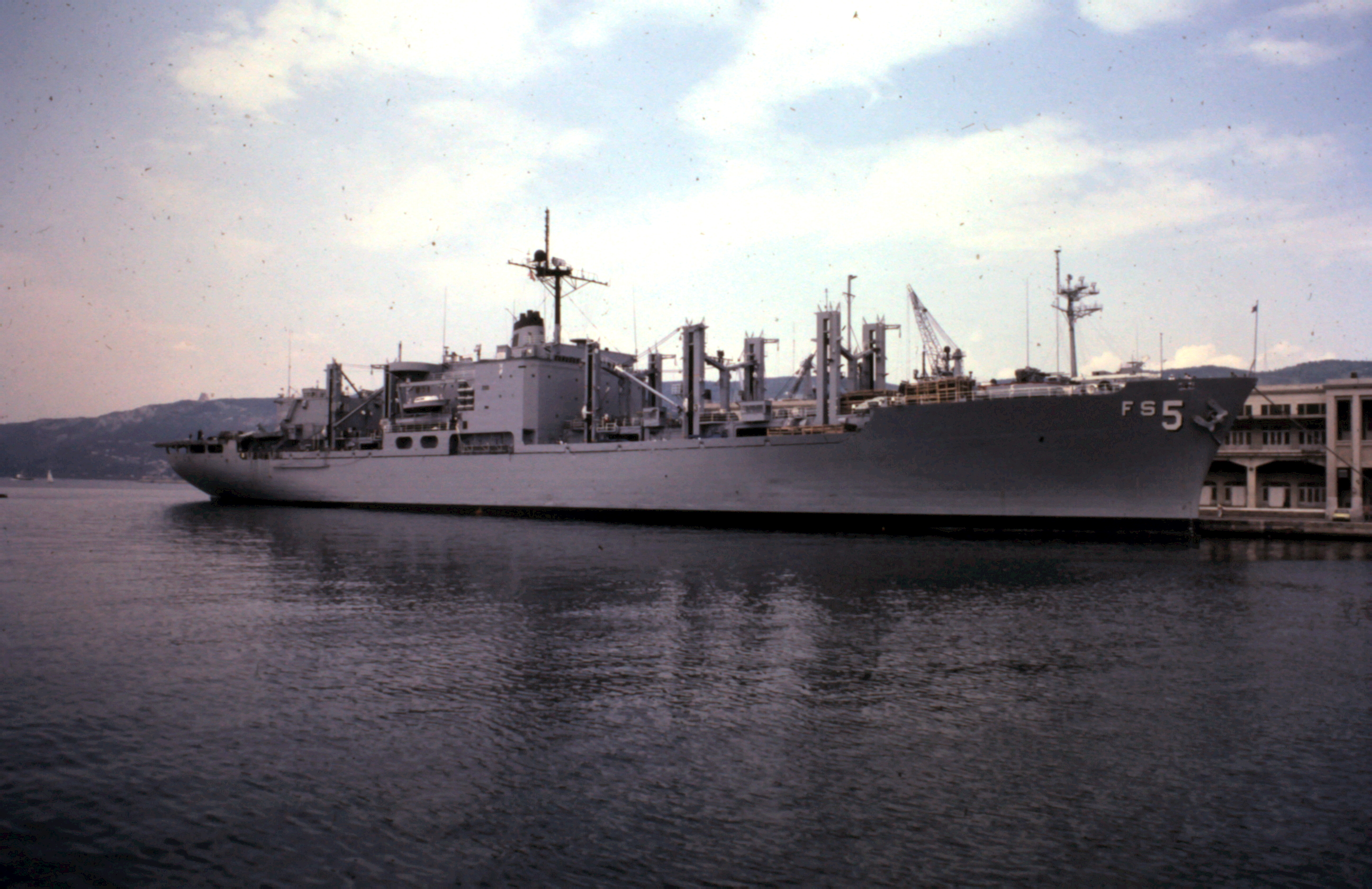
USS Concord (AFS-5) at Trieste, Italy in 1983

After being stricken on 18 August 2009, Concord was sunk at 16:12 hrs (UTC-10) on 17 July 2012 as part of the SINKEX portion of Rim of the Pacific naval exercises. She was struck by a Mark 48 torpedo fired from HMCS Victoria and settled in water 15,390 feet (4,690 meters) deep, 61 nautical miles (113 kilometres) from the coast of Kauai, Hawaii.
