= Combat stores ship =

Ships that provide supplies and propulsion and aviation fuel to combatant ships

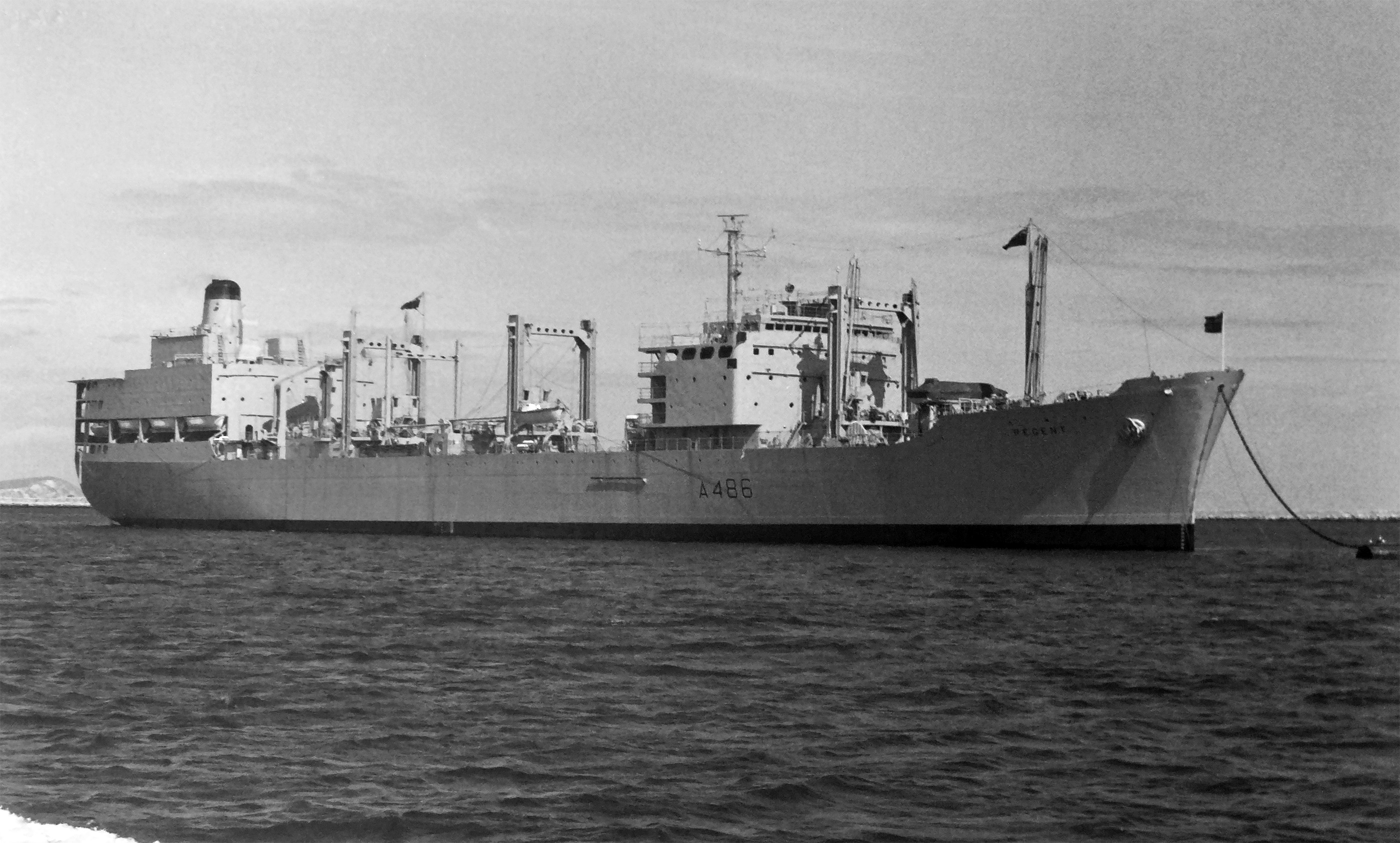
The Royal Fleet Auxiliary combat stores ship RFA Regent in 1967

Combat stores ships, or storeships, are naval auxiliary ships used to store logistic supplies and deliver provisions and motor fuel to other surface combatants on extended deployments. The United States Navy operated the Sirius and Mars classes, and the Royal Navy operated the Fort Rosalie class and continues to operate one Fort Victoria class ship, having scrapped the other. They carried or carry the fleets's refrigerated stores, dry provisions, technical spares, general stores, fleet freight, mail and replacement personnel or specialists. Storeships should not be confused with fast combat support ships which are high speed auxiliary ships or tenders which provide maintenance support to flotillas.

== Storeship ==
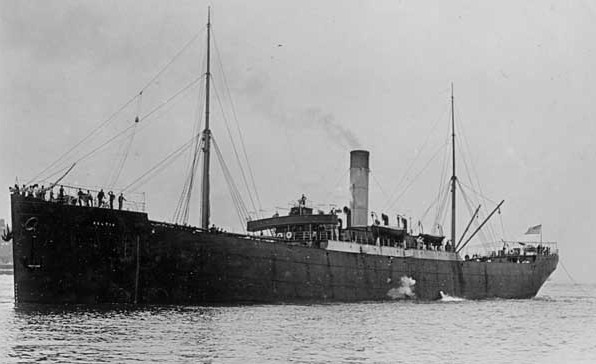
USS Celtic in the Spanish–American War in 1898.

Both the United States and the United Kingdom used stores ships in the War of 1812. In both the Mexican–American War and in the American Civil War, captured enemy prizes that were not considered "warlike" enough to be sold for prize money often became stores ships for a naval force operating where no friendly ports are nearby. USS Fredonia took part in the Baja California Campaign in the Mexican–American War. In both the Spanish–American War and the Philippine–American War the US Navy acquired the stores ship USS Celtic and other similar vessels to serve in its Asiatic Squadron.

== Combat stores ship ==
=== US Navy ===
Six combat stores ships operated by Military Sealift Command provided supplies, including frozen, chilled and dry provisions, and propulsion and aviation fuel to United States Navy combatant ships at sea for extended periods of time. Combat stores ships did not carry ammunition for resupply.

Combat stores ships provided underway replenishment of all types of supplies, ranging from repair parts to fresh food, clothing and mail via tensioned cargo rigs and CH-46 Sea Knight helicopters or their commercial equivalents. Combat stores ships have been replaced by the more capable Lewis and Clark-class dry cargo ships in the US Navy.

== Former combat stores ships ==
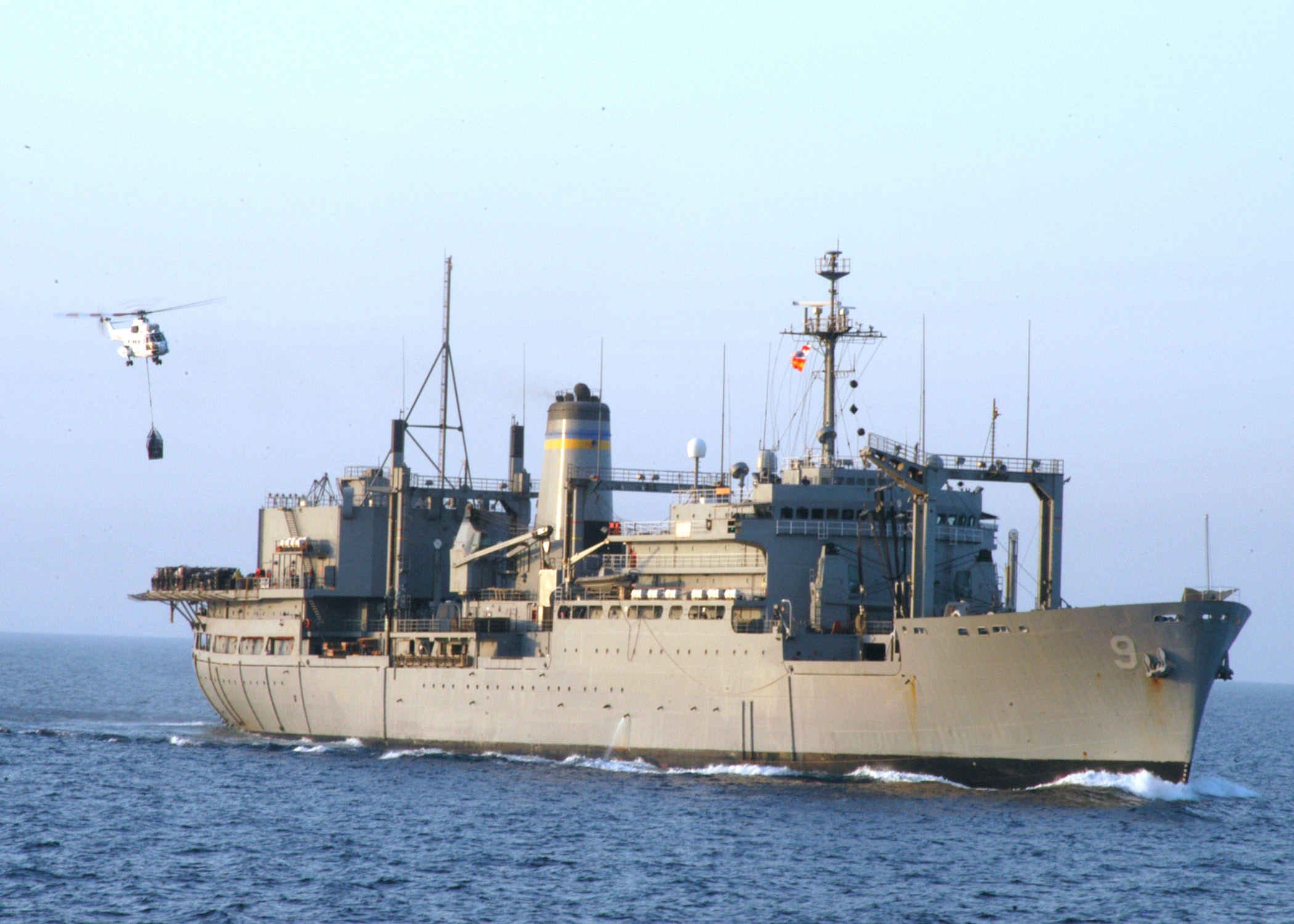
Sirius-class stores ship USNS Spica

Three ships were transferred from the British Royal Fleet Auxiliary to MSC in 1981–83: USNS Sirius on January 18, 1981; USNS Spica on November 5, 1981, and USNS Saturn on December 13, 1983. Five Navy Mars-class combat stores ships were transferred to Military Sealift Command in 1992–94: USNS Concord on October 15, 1992; Mars on February 1, 1993; San Diego on August 11, 1993; San Jose on November 2, 1993, and Niagara Falls on September 23, 1994. San Diego was deactivated on December 10, 1997, and Mars was deactivated on February 12, 1998. Sirius was sold in 2005, Spica was used as a target ship and sunk in 2009 and Saturn was used as a target ship and sunk in 2010.

== See also ==
- List of auxiliaries of the United States Navy § Combat Stores Ships (AFS, T-AFS)
- Replenishment oiler
