= Ness-class combat stores ship =

Class of combat stores ship of the Royal Fleet Auxiliary

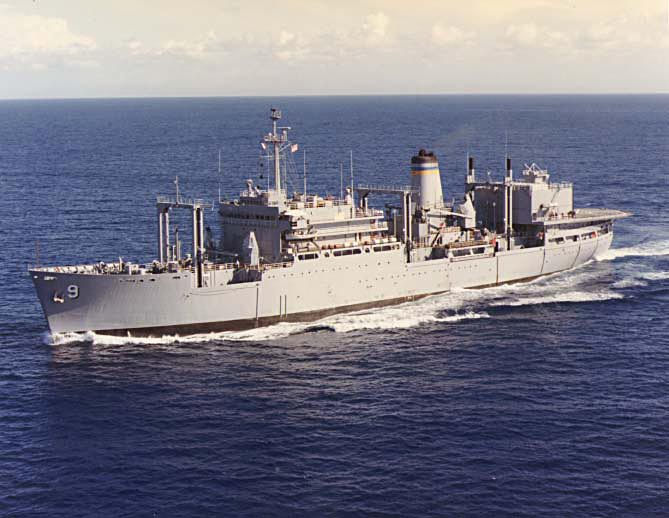
The USNS Spica

The Ness-class combat stores ship were a class of three combat stores ships built by Swan Hunter for the Royal Fleet Auxiliary (RFA), the naval auxiliary fleet of the United Kingdom, in the mid-1960s. They were purchased by the United States Navy (USN) in the mid-1980s and renamed Sirius class. They were operated by Military Sealift Command for the USN until the late 2000s when they were deactivated.

== See also ==
- List of replenishment ships of the Royal Fleet Auxiliary
