= RP-3 =

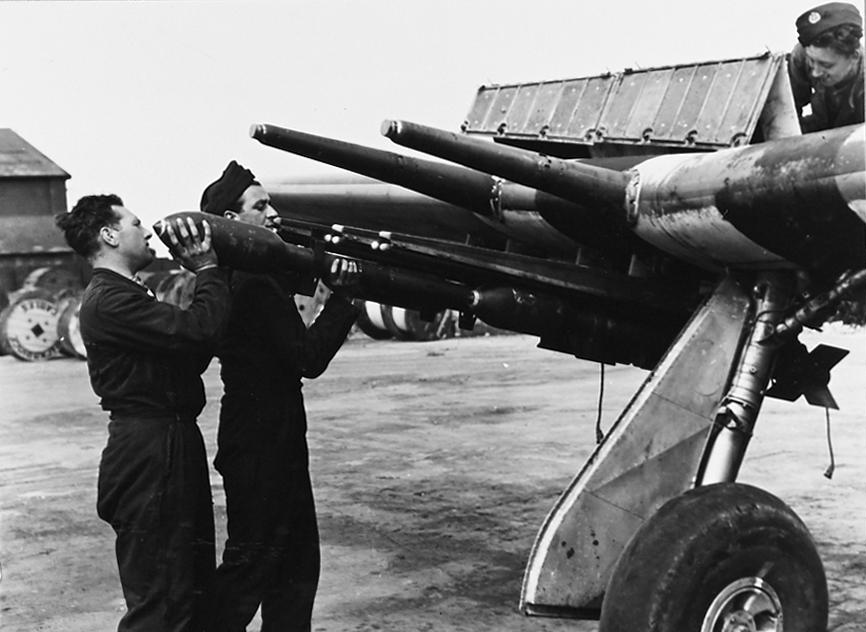
- Loading of RP-3 rockets fitted with 60 lb semi-armour-piercing high-explosive warheads onto a Hawker Typhoon
- Type: Unguided air-to-surface rocket
- Place of origin: United Kingdom

Service history
- In service: 1943–1968 (UK)
- Used by: Royal Air Force, Royal Navy, Royal Australian Air Force and others
- Wars: World War II, Indonesian National Revolution, Malayan Emergency, Suez Crisis, Korean War, Aden Emergency

Production history
- Variants: see variants

Specifications
- Mass: 35 lb (16 kg) 17.9 kg (39 lb) Mk 1 engine 17.2 kg (38 lb) Mk 2, 3, 4 engine
- Length: 55 in (1,400 mm) rocket 500–560 mm (20–22 in) warhead
- Diameter: 3.25 in (83 mm) rocket body
- Warhead: TNT/RDX/Amatol
- Warhead weight: 1.3–5.5 kg (2.9–12.1 lb)
- Engine: solid fuel rocket 7,800 N; 1,800 lbf (800 kgf)
- Propellant: cordite
- Operational range: 5,200 ft (1,600 m)
- Maximum speed: With 25 lb (11 kg) warhead: 1,200 ft/s (380 m/s); With 60 lb (27 kg) warhead: 750 ft/s (230 m/s)
- Guidance system: Unguided
- Launch platform: Aircraft; Landing Craft Tank (Rocket)

The RP-3 (from Rocket Projectile 3 inch) was a British air-to-ground rocket projectile introduced during the Second World War. The "3 inch" designation referred to the nominal diameter of the rocket motor tube. The use of a 60 lb (27 kg) warhead gave rise to the alternative name of the "60-pound rocket". Though an air-to-ground weapon, it saw limited use in other roles. They were generally used by British fighter-bomber aircraft against targets such as tanks, trains, motor transport and buildings, as well as by Coastal Command and Royal Navy aircraft against U-boats and ships.

Use continued post-war, with the last known major operational use being during the Aden Emergency in 1964, where Hawker Hunters flew 642 sorties and fired 2,508 RP-3s in support of Radforce. Use continued until the withdrawal from Aden Protectorate in November 1967, at which point the RP-3 was withdrawn from service in favour of the newer SNEB. Concerned about the possibility of shipboard radar setting off the SNEB's electrical ignition, the Royal Navy replaced their RP-3s with a new design, sometimes known as the 2-inch RP.

== History ==
=== Earlier systems ===
The first use of rockets fired from aircraft was during the First World War. The "unrotated projectiles" (UPs) were Le Prieur rockets mounted on the interplane struts of Nieuport fighters. These were used to attack observation balloons and were reasonably successful. Sopwith Baby, Sopwith Pup and Home Defence B.E.2 fighters also carried rockets.

=== Development ===
Starting in 1935, the British began development of new anti-aircraft weapons, including cordite-powered surface-to-air rockets. Several models of these Unrotated Projectile (UPs) were introduced, starting with a 7 inches (180 mm) diameter model that saw use both in ground batteries and on larger ships. In 1937, new models at 2 inches (51 mm) and 3 inches (76 mm) diameters were introduced. By 1938, work on the 2-inch model had been slowed in favour of the 3-inch models which offered performance similar to the QF 3-inch 20 cwt anti-aircraft gun. Tests in Bermuda in 1939 suggested that the accuracy was not high enough to be used in a fashion similar to a gun, and development was slowed.

After the Dunkirk evacuation in 1940 it was clear an attack on the UK was coming, and production was quickly ramped up. Still considering the accuracy to be low, they were to be fired in salvos from the "Z-Batteries". Consisting largely of light metal tubes on a rotating platform, 7,000 launchers were available by August 1940, although production of the rockets themselves lagged and only 10 rockets each were assigned to 840 launchers. Several updated models of the launchers were introduced and the system claimed a small number of aircraft.

=== Air-to-ground ===
When German forces under the command of Erwin Rommel intervened in the Western Desert campaign from early 1941, it became clear that the Desert Air Force lacked weapons capable of damaging or destroying the large numbers of armoured fighting vehicles, particularly the heavier Panzer III and Panzer IV medium tanks used by the Germans. In April 1941 Henry Tizard, the chief scientist of the British government, called together a panel to study "Methods of Attacking Armoured Vehicles".

The types of weapons investigated included the 40 mm Vickers S gun and related weapons manufactured by the Coventry Ordnance Works, as well as the Bofors 40 mm and the US 37 mm T9 cannon fitted to the Bell P-39 Airacobra; it was already recognised that these weapons were only capable of dealing with light tanks and motor transport. Using larger weapons on fighter-bombers was ruled out because of weight and difficulties handling recoil. The chairman of the panel, Mr. Ivor Bowen (Assistant Director of Armament Research) turned to the idea of using rocket projectiles to deliver a large warhead capable of destroying or disabling heavy tanks. Information was sought from the Soviets, who had been using unguided RS-82 rockets since 1937. (Note: The possibility of the Soviets sending a team of engineers to help set up production of these weapons was canvassed in August 1941. The Soviet offer was withdrawn, in spite of Operation Benedict British efforts at supplying Hawker Hurricanes and training Soviet aircrew in their use.)

By September 1941 it was decided that two models of UP would be developed:

- A 23 lb plastic explosive on a standard 2-inch UP
- A 20 lb solid armour-piercing head on a 3-inch UP

When it was realised that the 2-inch version would be less effective than the Vickers S cannon, it was decided to concentrate on development of the 3-inch version, which could be developed from the 3-inch rocket used in the Z-Batteries.

== Design ==
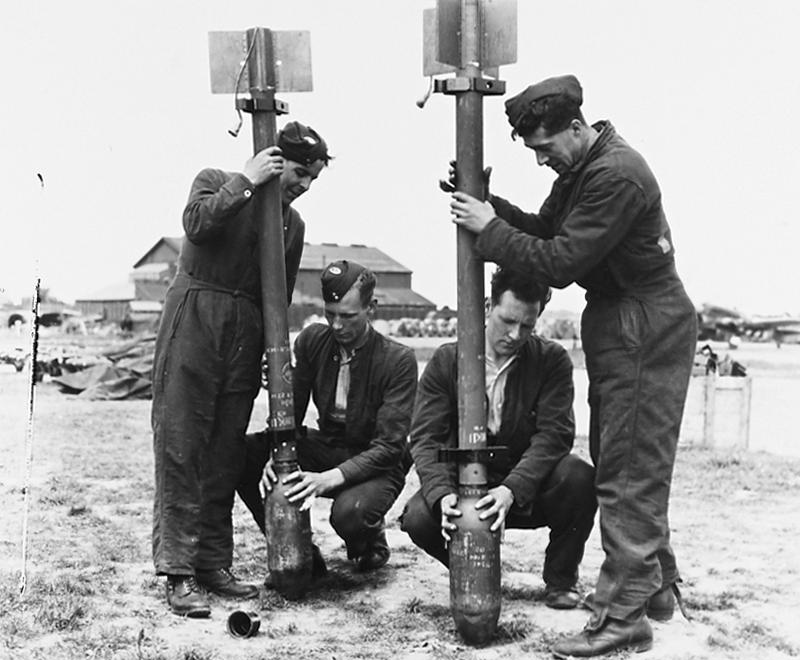
Attaching 60 lb SAP warheads onto RP-3 rocket projectile bodies

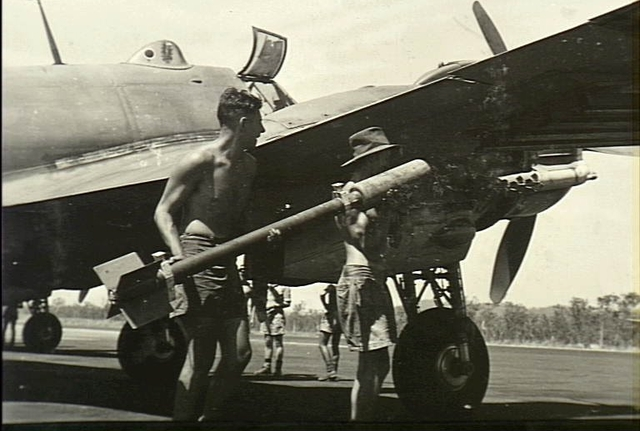
RP-3 rocket with 60 lb concrete practice warhead

The rocket body was a steel tube 3.25 in (83 mm) in diameter and 55.19 in (1,402 mm) long filled with 5.2 kg (11.5 lb) of cordite propellant, fired electrically. The warhead was screwed into the forward end, and was initially a solid 24 lb 12 oz (11.2 kg), 3.44 in (87 mm) diameter and 12.4 in (310 mm) long (with adaptor) armour-piercing warhead which was quickly supplanted by a 152 mm (5.98 in), 27.4 kg (60.4 lb) high explosive head. For practice there were also a 25-pound (11 kg) mild steel semi-armour-piercing warhead, a 25-pound (11 kg) concrete practice head and a 27.2 kg (60.0 lb) concrete practice head. Once the rocket had been mounted on the rails, an electrical lead (or "pigtail") connected the rocket to the firing controls.

Four large tailfins 4 by 5 in (100 by 130 mm) induced enough spin to stabilize the rocket, but as it was unguided, aiming was a matter of judgment and experience. Approach to the target needed to be precise, with no sideslip or yaw, which could throw the RP off line. Aircraft speed had to be precise at the moment of launch, and the angle of attack required precision. Trajectory drop was also a problem, especially at longer ranges. (Note: In tests carried out by the A&AEE, dispersion (when aimed at a 20-foot (6.1 m) square target) was 13 ft 6 in (4.11 m) at 1,000-foot (300 m) range – equal to 3° to 4° aiming error.)

The rocket was less complicated and more reliable than a gun firing a shell and there was no recoil on firing. It was found to be a demoralising form of attack against ground troops and the 60-pound warhead could be devastating. The rocket installations were light enough to be carried by single-seat fighters, giving them the punch of a cruiser. (Note: A typical Royal Navy cruiser of the era carried eight to twelve 6-inch guns firing 112-pound (51 kg) projectiles, while a fighter could fire eight 60-pound RP-3 rockets in a single salvo.) Against slow-moving large targets like shipping and U-boats, the rocket was a formidable weapon.

The weight and drag of the all-steel rails initially fitted to British aircraft blunted performance. Some aircraft such as the Fairey Swordfish biplane used against submarines had steel "anti-blast" panels fitted under the rails to protect the wing, which further increased weight and drag. Aluminium Mark III rails, introduced from late 1944, reduced the effect. American experience with their own rockets (the USAAF's 3.5-Inch Forward Firing Aircraft Rocket (FFAR) and the US Navy's 5-inch FFAR and HVAR) showed that the long rails and anti-blast panels were unnecessary; zero-length launchers were introduced in May 1945. British aircraft started being fitted with "zero-point" mounting pylons in the post-war years.

The 3-inch rocket motors (less warhead) were used in the 'bunker buster' "Disney bomb" (official name: 4500 lb Concrete Piercing/Rocket Assisted bomb), 19 of them propelling the 4,500-pound (2.0 t) bomb to 990 mph (440 m/s) at impact with the target.

== Service history ==
=== Air-to-ground use ===
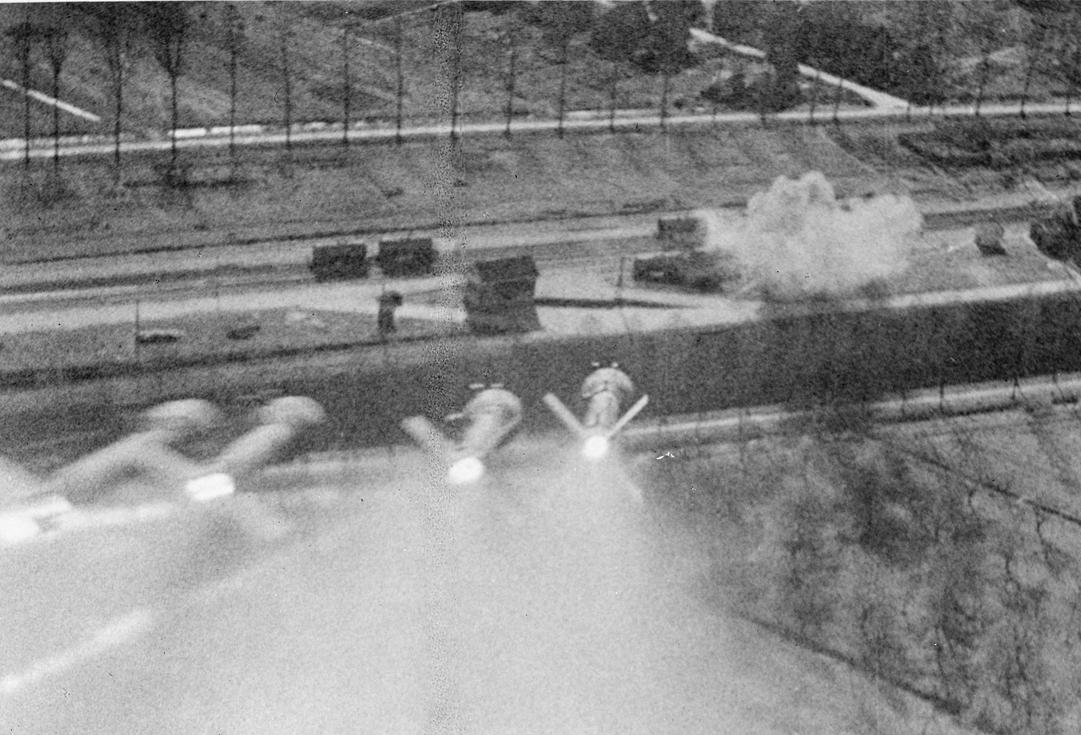
Hawker Typhoon gun camera photo of a rocket salvo fired at railway wagons in a siding at Nordhorn, Germany (1945)

Before the new weapon was released for service extensive tests were carried out by the Instrument, Armament and Defence Flight (IADF) at the Royal Aircraft Establishment, Farnborough. Hawker Hurricanes were fitted with rockets and rails and flown during June and July 1942. Further tests were undertaken from 28 September to 30 November to develop rocket-firing tactics. Other aircraft used were a Lockheed Hudson, a Fairey Swordfish biplane torpedo bomber, a Douglas Boston medium bomber and a Sea Hurricane. At the same time the Aeroplane and Armament Experimental Establishment (A&AEE) had to develop tactics for all the individual aircraft types which were to be armed with the RPs. Aiming was through a standard GM.II reflector gunsight. A later modification enabled the reflector to be tilted with the aid of a graduated scale, depressing the line of sight, the GM.IIL. For rockets only the Mk IIIA was the most successful – it was used on the Lockheed Ventura and Hudson.

The first operational use of the RP was in the Western Desert campaign as a "tank-busting" weapon on Hawker Hurricane Mk. IIEs and IVs. The 25-pound armour-piercing heads were found to be ineffective against the Tiger I heavy tanks coming into German service. With the example of the success of Royal Artillery gunners using high-explosive shells from their Ordnance QF 25 pounder gun-howitzers, it was decided to design a new 60-pound semi-armour-piercing (SAP) head. These were capable of knocking turrets off tanks.

A typical RP-3 installation was four projectiles on launching rails under each wing. A selector switch was fitted to allow the pilot to fire them singly (later omitted), in pairs, or as a full salvo. Towards the end of the war some RAF Second Tactical Air Force (2 TAF) Hawker Typhoons had their installation adapted to carry an additional four rockets doubled up under the eight already fitted.

RP-3s were widely used during the battle the Falaise pocket in mid-August 1944. During the battle German forces, retreating to avoid being trapped in a pincer movement by Allied ground forces, came under air attack. Amongst the waves of light, medium and fighter bombers attacking the German columns the Typhoons of 2 TAF attacked with their rockets, claiming hundreds of tanks and "mechanised enemy transport". (Note: also known as "motorized enemy transport", as opposed to "horse-drawn transport" (HDT)) After the battle, Army and 2nd TAF Operational Research Sections studying the battleground came to the conclusion that far fewer vehicles, 17 in total, had been destroyed by rocket strike alone. What was clear was that in the heat of battle it was far harder for pilots to launch the weapons while meeting the conditions needed for accuracy. Smoke, dust and debris in the target areas made accurate assessment of the damage caused almost impossible. It was also clear that rocket attacks devastated the morale of enemy troops – many vehicles were found abandoned intact, or with only superficial damage. Interrogation of captured prisoners showed that even the prospect of rocket attack was extremely unnerving for them.

Large stocks of RP-3s remained at the end of the war and they were used well into the jet age. They were used operationally during the Malayan Emergency, Korean War and the Indonesia–Malaysia confrontation. The last known use in combat is by Hawker Hunters in Aden from 1964 to as late as 1967 in support of Radforce. When these aircraft moved to Bahrain in November 1967, the remaining RP-3s were withdrawn from service and replaced by the newer SNEB.

=== Anti-submarine ===
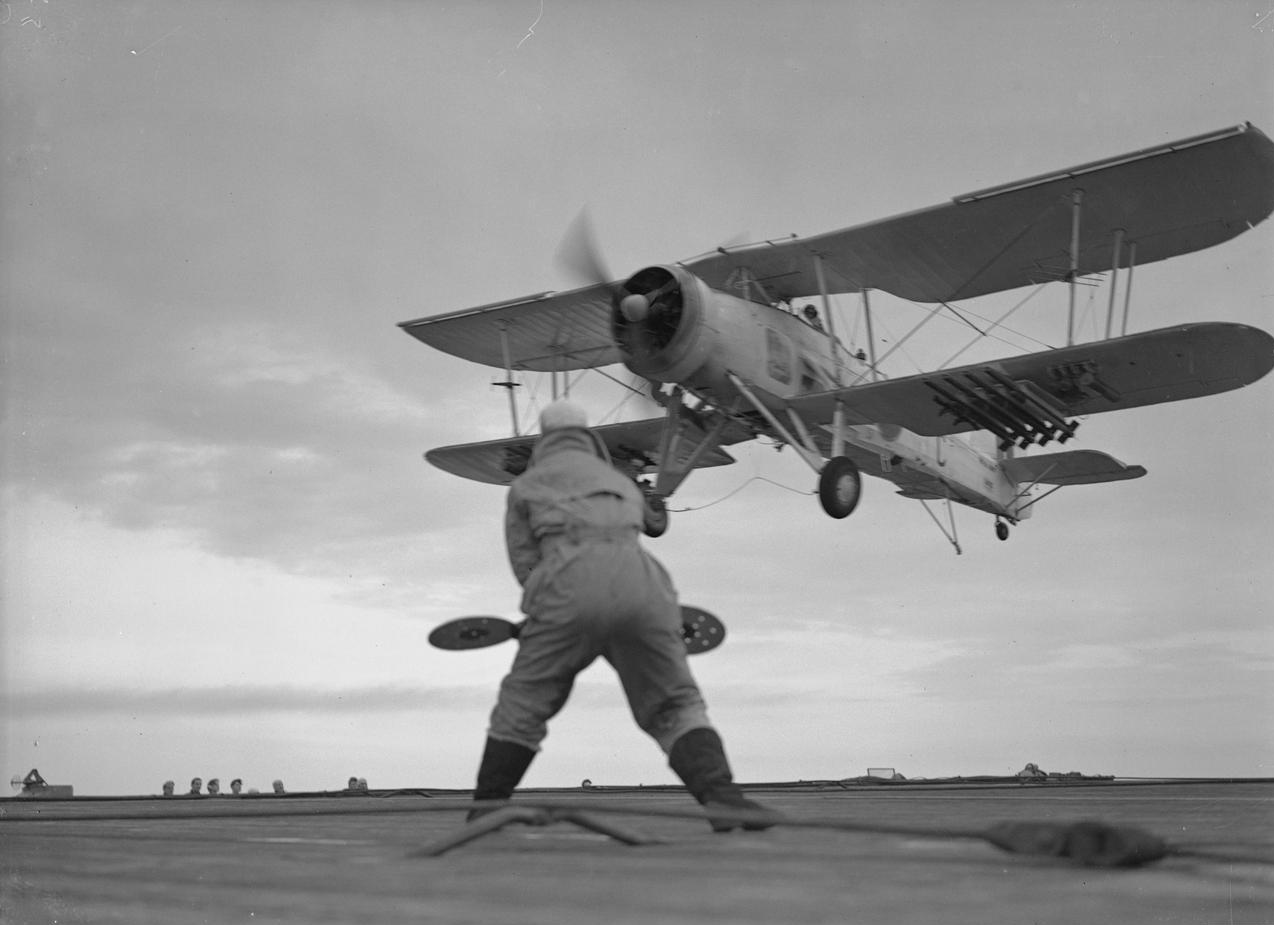
A rocket-armed Swordfish lands aboard the escort carrier HMS Tracker.

Soon after some encouraging results from the initial deployment, trials of the weapon were conducted against targets representing U-boats. It was discovered that if the rockets were fired at a shallow angle, near misses resulted in the rockets curving upwards in seawater and piercing the targets below the waterline. Soon Coastal Command and the Royal Navy's Fleet Air Arm aircraft were using the rockets extensively.

The first U-boat destroyed with the assistance of a rocket attack was U-752 (commanded by Kapitän-Leutnant Schroeter), on 23 May 1943, by a Swordfish of 819 Naval Air Squadron (819 NAS). The rockets used on this occasion had solid, cast-iron heads and were known as "rocket spears". One of these punched right through the submarine's pressure hull and rendered it incapable of diving; the U–boat was scuttled by its crew. On 28 May 1943, an RAF Hudson of 608 Squadron destroyed a U-boat in the Mediterranean, the first destroyed solely by rocket. These rockets were, among other factors, credited with making it too dangerous for the Germans to continue operating their Flak U-Boats, which were fitted with heavy anti-aircraft weaponry and acted as escorts for U-boats crossing the Bay of Biscay.

From then until the end of the Second World War in Europe, Coastal Command and the Fleet Air Arm used the rockets as one of their primary weapons (alongside torpedoes, which, to a certain extent they replaced) against shipping and surfaced U-boats.

=== Ground-to-ground use ===
As part of the initial bombardment of the landing areas for the Normandy landings June 1944, Landing Craft Tank (Rocket) each armed with about 1000 RP-3 rockets were used. The LCT(R) fired the rockets in large salvoes of around 40 RP-3 at a time.

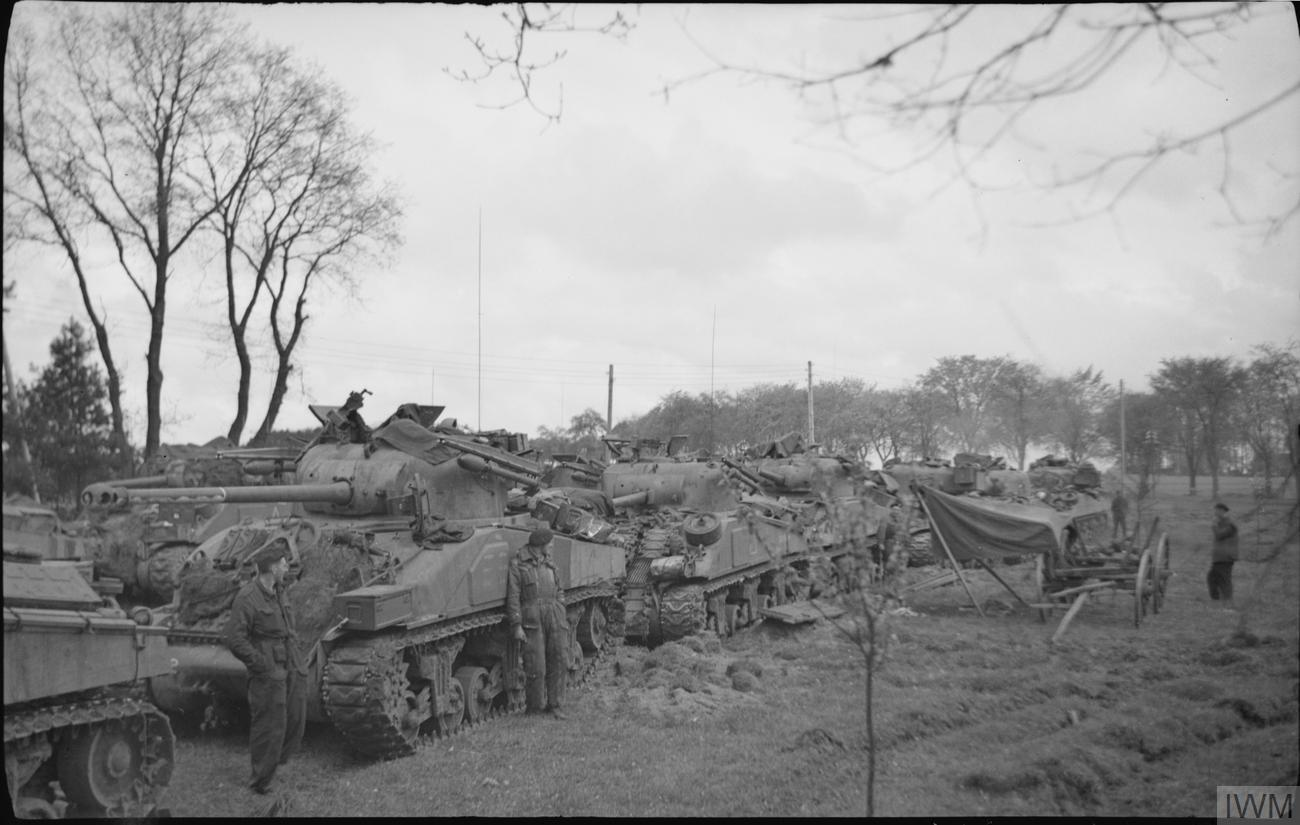
Rocket-armed Sherman tanks of the Coldstream Guards, 28 April 1945

In 1945, some British M4 Sherman tanks were fitted with two or four rails – one or two either side of the turret – to carry 60-pound headed rockets. These were used at the Rhine Crossing by tanks of the 1st Coldstream Guards. The tanks were called "Sherman Tulips". The tanks fitted included both conventional Shermans and the more heavily armed Sherman Fireflies.

The modifications were first tried out by two officers of the 1st Armoured Battalion, Coldstream Guards, 5th Guards Armoured Brigade, who obtained rockets and launching rails from an RAF base and carried out the first test firings on 17 March 1945. They were inspired after hearing the idea had been earlier tried, but abandoned, by a Canadian reconnaissance unit, the 18th Armoured Car Regiment (12th Manitoba Dragoons), who had fitted RP-3 rails to a Staghound Armoured Car in November 1944. There are photos of four such rockets on a Cromwell cruiser tank, however little is known about it for certain.

Within a week all the tanks of Number 2 Squadron had been fitted with launch rails, some tanks had two launching rails, others had four. The rails were at fixed elevations and the rockets had fixed ranges either 400 or 800 yards (370 or 730 m).

The rockets were highly inaccurate when fired from a tank as they were being fired from a stationary point and had little slipstream over the fins. Despite this, the RP-3 was valued by tank crews for the destructive effect of its 60-pound warhead. In combat, they were also used for short-range, saturation bombardment of an area and were effective as an immediate counter to German ambushes.

=== Swedish service ===
The RP-3 rocket saw use with the Swedish Air Force from 1946 to 1957.

Sweden had been experimenting with caseless ammunition as a substitute for air-to-ground rockets during WWII as it was thought that caseless ammunition would be cheaper to produce. This however proved false and by the end of the war the Swedish air force had moved to rocket development instead. The Swedish weapons company Bofors had been developing rockets on their own initiative since 1943 but, due to lack of funding, did not have a design by the time the Swedish air force gained interest. As it would take years to develop indigenous rockets for the Swedish air force it was decided to buy rockets from abroad to gain operational experience which could be used in indigenous development.

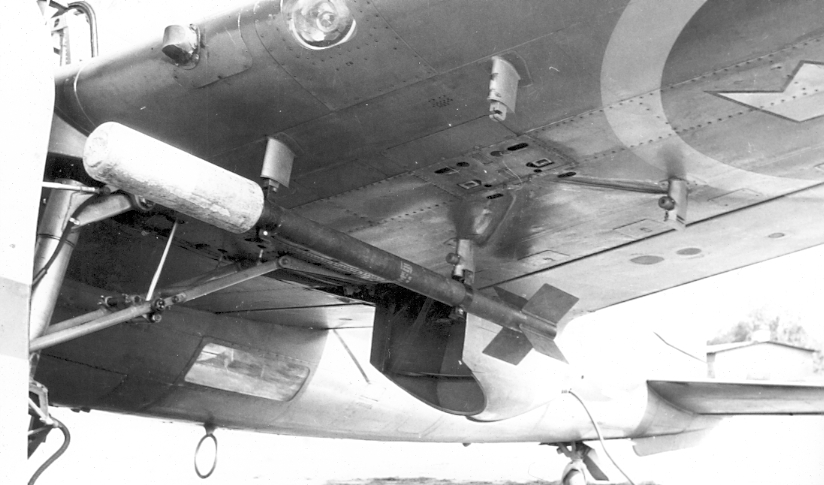
Saab B 17A from Västgöta Wing (F 6 Karlsborg) trialed with RP-3 rockets in May 1946. Tests were successful and the RP-3 was accepted for service as the 8 cm rocket m/46.

The RP-3 was chosen, and Sweden ordered a batch in 1946 for trials on the Saab B 17A dive bomber as it was readily available. In May a B 17A was fitted with rocket mounts for ground trials, and shortly after a Saab B 18B was also modified. The first firing trials took place at F 14 Ringenäs (belonging to Halland wing) during July 1946. Twenty six '60 lb Practice' rockets were fired from the B 18B and three from the B 17A. Six '25 lb AP' and '60 lb SAP' rockets each were also fired from the B 17A. The trials were successful and the RP-3 entered service with the Swedish Air Force.

In Swedish service the RP-3 and its components were given Swedish Air Force designations. The RP-3 system as a whole was designated "8 cm raket m/46". The RP-3 rocket engines that Sweden acquired were most likely the Mk.4/TH type based on available photos and descriptions. These were designated 8 cm raketmotor m/46 (8 cm rakmo m/46). The square fins were designated 8 cm fena m/46.

The Swedish Air Force adopted four warheads for the RP-3 rocket: the 25 lb AP No.1, 25 lb AP No.2, 60 lb SAP No.2 and 60 lb Practice.

- 25 lb AP No.1 was designated 8 cm Pansarspets m/46A, (English: "8 cm armour tip model 46A"), in 1951 redesignated to 8 cm pansarhuvud m/46A (8 cm phu m/46A) (English: "8 cm armour head 46A").
- 25 lb AP No.2 was designated 8 cm Pansarspets m/46B, redesignated in 1951 to 8 cm pansarhuvud m/46B (8 cm phu m/46B).
- 60 lb SAP No.2 was designated 8 cm Sprängspets m/46, ("8 cm Explosive tip 46"), in 1951 redesignated to 8 cm spränghuvud m/46 (8 cm shu m/46), ("8 cm explosive head m/46").
- 60 lb Practice was designated 8 cm Övningsspets m/46, in 1951 redesignated to 8 cm övningshuvud m/46 (8 cm övnhu m/46).

In combination with the engine and square fins these warheads would produce the following rockets:

- 8 cm Pansarraket m/46A redesignated in 1951 as 8 cm pansarraket m/46A (8 cm prak m/46A).
- 8 cm Pansarraket m/46B redesignated as 8 cm pansarraket m/46B (8 cm prak m/46B).
- 8 cm Sprängraket m/46 redesignated as 15 cm sprängraket m/46 (8 cm srak m/46).
- 8 cm Övningsraket m/46 redesignated as 15 cm övningsraket m/46 (8 cm övnrak m/46).

In 1952 Sweden had developed a whole line of indigenous rockets and started phasing out the RP-3. All models but the 8 cm prak m/46B disappeared before 1953. The remaining 8 cm prak m/46B rockets were modified with new sloped fins around 1953. Around 30% of the fin surface area was removed. This decreased the chance of the fins breaking off during launch and also increased accuracy. These fins were designated 8 cm fena m/46C and when equipped on the 8 cm prak m/46B the suffix changed to C, then becoming 8 cm pansarraket m/46C (8 cm prak m/46C). The 8 cm prak m/46C remained in service until 1957.

During its service life in the Swedish air force the rocket came to serve on several Swedish aircraft. To allow universal usage of the RP-3 the first and second generation of Swedish air-to-ground rockets used the same mounting system as the RP-3.

== Variants ==
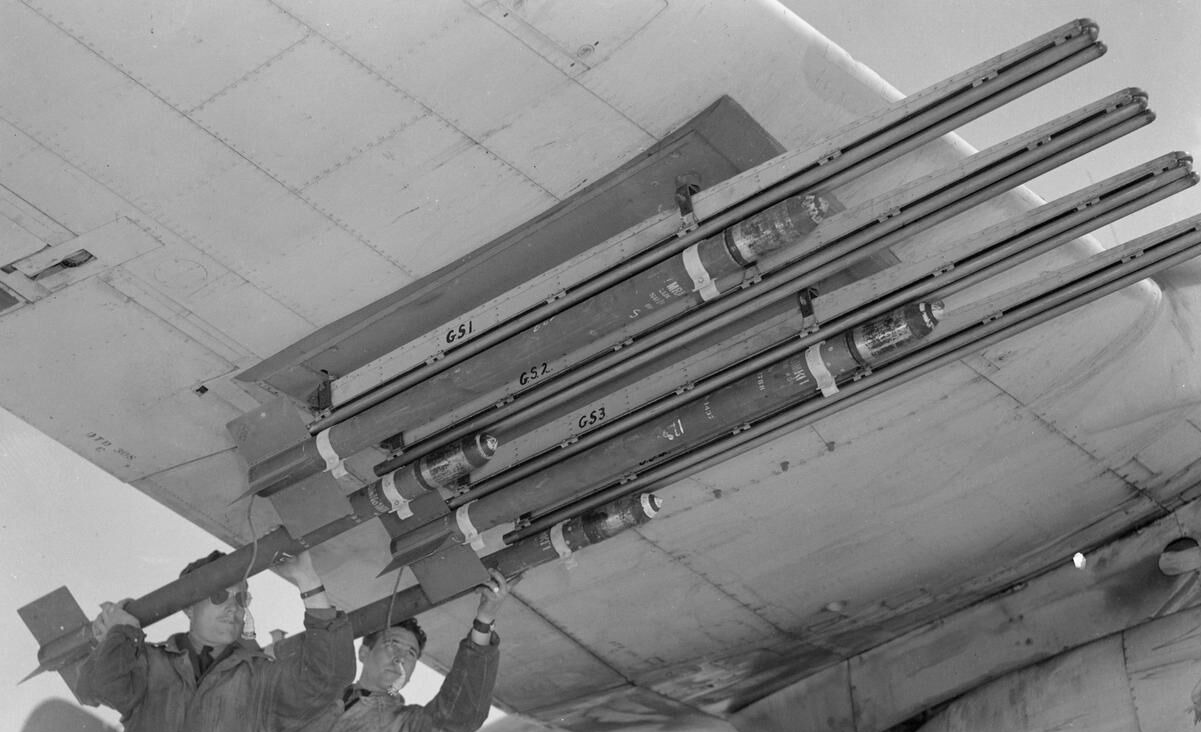
Shot, 25 lb, AP, No. 1, Mk. I rockets loaded onto Coastal Command Bristol Beaufighter

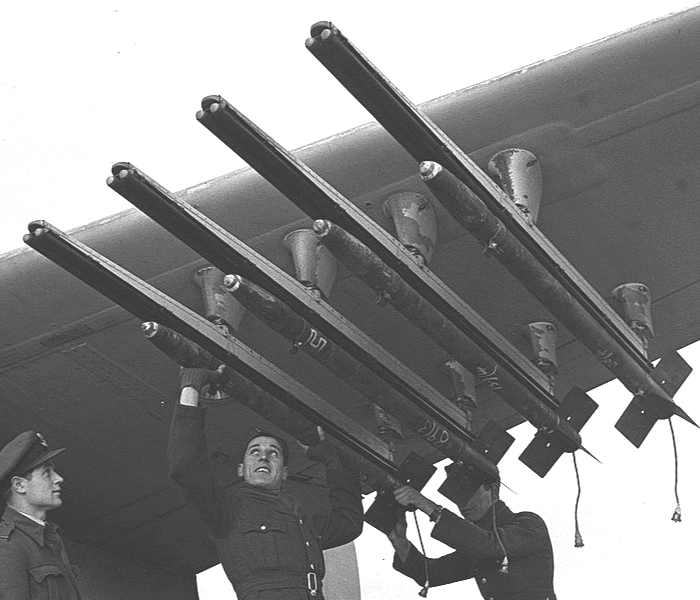
Shot, 25 lb, AP, No. 2, Mk. I rockets loaded onto de Havilland Mosquito

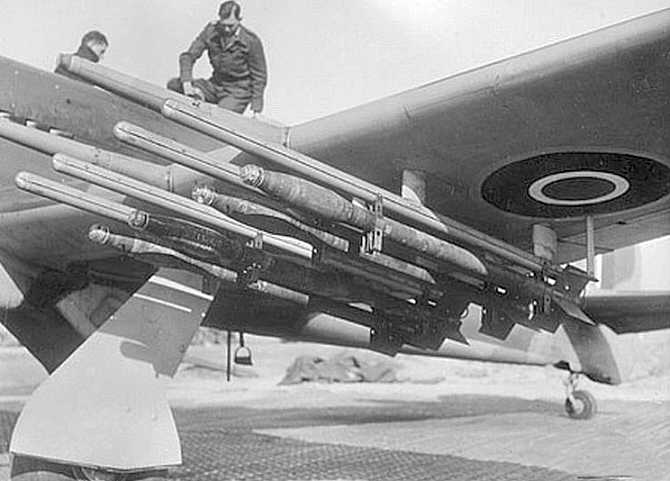
Shell, HE, 60 lb, "F"., No. 1, Mk. I rockets mounted on Hawker Typhoon

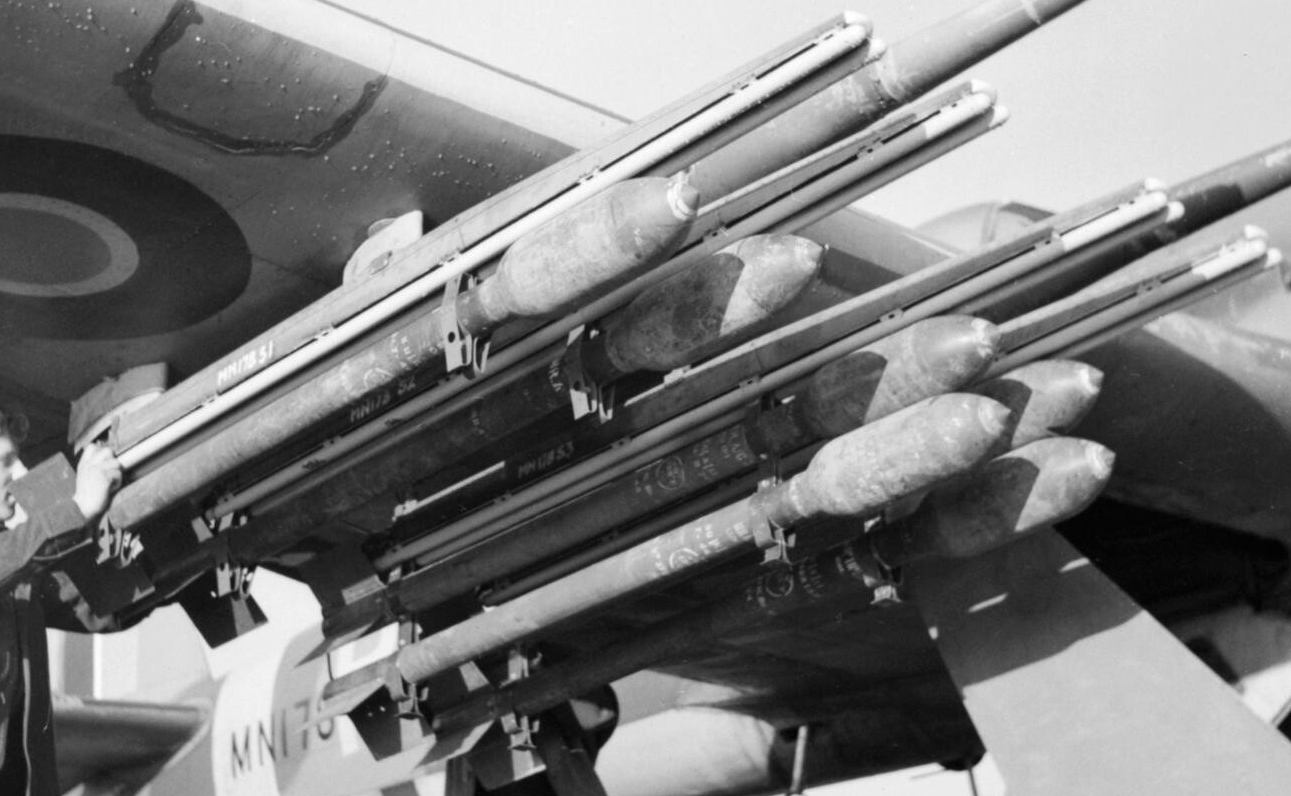
Shell, HE, 60 lb, SAP rockets mounted on Hawker Typhoon

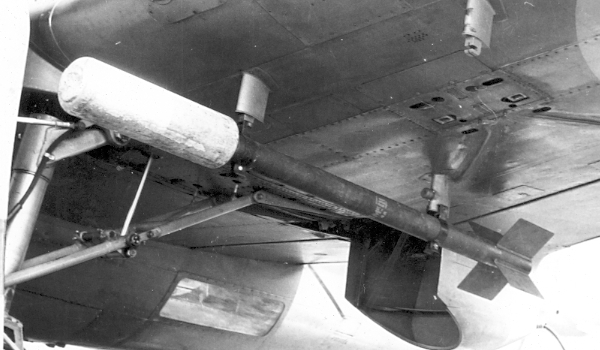
Shell, Practice, Concrete, 60 lb Mk. I rocket mounted on Saab 17

=== Warheads ===
Shell, 18 lb, HE
8 kg (17.6 lb) "high-explosive" warhead.

Shot, 25 lb, AP, No. 1, Mk. I
Armour-piercing warhead made out of hardened steel. Used against submarines and merchant ships at angles of 15 degrees or greater.

Shot, 25 lb, AP, No. 2, Mk. I
Improved design over the Shot, 25 lb, AP, No. 2, Mk. I warhead made longer and pointier to increase penetration. It was used at angles of attack of less than 15 degrees.

Shot, 25 lb, SAP, Mk. I
Semi-armour-piercing" warhead; same design as the "Shot, 25 lb, AP, No. 2, Mk. I" but made out of mild steel and having the spigot fuzed together with the body. By 1946 the design was obsolete and only used for advanced training.

Shot, 25 lb, Practice, Concrete, Mk. I
Practice warhead 11 1/2 inches by 5 inches diameter made out of concrete, meant to simulate shooting the 25 lb AP and SAP warheads.

Shell, HE, 60 lb, "F"., No. 1, Mk. I
Fragmentation warhead for use against unarmoured vehicles and personnel. Converted from a 4.5 in (114 mm) howitzer shell with a ("direct action") Fuze, D.A., No. 899, Mk. I (Note: A No. 721 artillery fuze adapted with an arming device and other elements making it safer for aircraft use, the warhead arming itself about 0.7 seconds after launch) fitted to the nose, the whole warhead was 22 in (560 mm) long and weighed 50.5 lb (22.9 kg). The relatively thick wall (0.85 inches) and 4 lb (1.8 kg) high explosive (TNT or RDX/TNT) filling produced "heavy fragments" which inflicted damage at "considerable distance". (Note: The safety instructions advised against firing at less than 600 yd (550 m) range due to the risk to the aircraft.)

Shell, HE, 60 lb, SAP
Semi-armour-piercing high-explosive warhead that existed in four primary variants:
- Shell, HE, 60 lb, SAP, No. 1, Mk. I
- Shell, HE, 60 lb, SAP, No. 2, Mk. I
- Shell, HE, 60 lb, SAP, No. 1, Mk. II
- Shell, HE, 60 lb, SAP, No. 2, Mk. II

Variants designated mark 1 (Mk. I) had a shell body that consisted of two parts that were screwed together, a body and a tip. Variants designated mark 2 (Mk. II) had the aforementioned shell body and tip forged together as one piece. Variants designated number 1 (No. 1) were fitted with a time delayed base fuze (Fuze, No. 865, Mk. I) that allowed them to penetrate into a target before detonating. Variants designated number 2 (No. 2) were fitted with a non-delayed base fuze (Fuze, No. 878, Mk. I) which made them detonate almost instantly on impact.

Shell, Practice, Concrete, 60 lb Mk. I
Practice warhead 20 in long by 6 in diameter formed of concrete over steel reinforcing rods. Used to simulate shooting the 60 lb SAP/HE warheads. This warhead could also be fitted with the "Smoke container, No. 1, Mk. I", which pressed on over front of the warhead and gave off a smoke signal on impact. The filling was 16 oz (450 g) of titanium tetrachloride.

Shell, HE, 60 lb, G.P.
High-explosive general-purpose (Hollow charge) warhead, trials ongoing as of September 1946. It could penetrate 198 mm (7.8 in) at any range.

=== Rocket engines ===
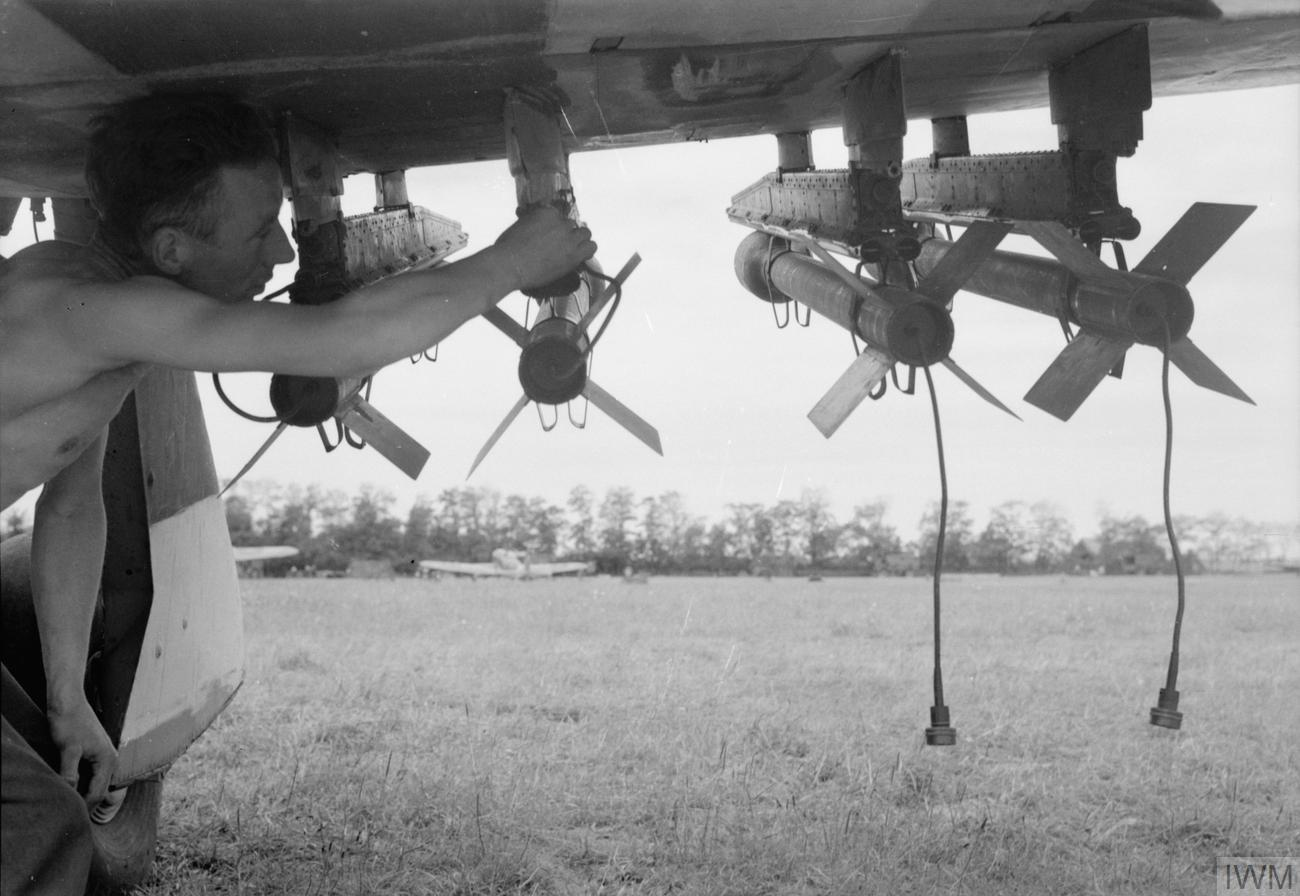
An armourer attaching the electrical plugs which fire the RP-3 rocket engines

The RP-3 rocket engine was updated a number of times during its lifespan, which gave rise to a number of variants. For example, it was necessary to modify the rocket engine's propellant charge in order to be able to use several types of warheads. Initially the rocket engine was only designed to use warheads up to 25 lb (11 kg), but when warheads up to 60 lb (27 kg) were introduced the propellant charge had to be modified in order to use them. Variants capable of carrying warheads up to 60 lb were then given the supplementary designation TH after the mark number.

Aircraft rocket motor, 3 in., No. 1, Mk. 1
The Mk. 1 engine had a 12.5 lb (5.7 kg) tubular-shaped cordite propellant charge. The ignition cables are routed through the tubular propellant charge. This variant was suitable for use with 25 lb solid warheads. It was not suitable for tropical climates (above 80 °F (27 °C))
Aircraft rocket motor, 3 in., No. 1, Mk. 1/TH
TH variant of the Mk. 1 engine that could mount solid or shell warheads up to 25 lb. It could likewise not be used in hot climates.
Aircraft rocket motor, 3 in., No. 1, Mk. 2
The Mk. 2 engine replaced the tubular propellant charge with an 11 lb (5.0 kg) cruciform (cross-shaped) propellant charge through a different metal grid. The ignition cables were routed in one of the inner corners of the cruciform propellant-charge. This variant was only capable of mounting 25 lb warheads.
Aircraft rocket motor, 3 in., No. 1, Mk. 2/TH
TH variant of the Mk. 2 engine that could mount warheads up to 60 lb.
Aircraft rocket motor, 3 in., No. 1, Mk. 3/TH
The Mk. 3 engine replaced the two-pin ignition plug with a single-pin one
Aircraft rocket motor, 3 in., No. 1, Mk. 4/TH
The Mk. 4 engines extended the ignition cables to allow for double hanging, where one RP-3 was mounted below another RP-3. During storage the extra length of the ignition cables was held in place by loose metal clips in the nozzle.

=== Comparison ===
Comparison of complete rounds (Note: Taken from the Swedish Air Force 1950 manual "Bestämmelser för rakettjänst". See also Boyd)
Warhead	Shot, 25 lb, AP, No. 1	Shot, 25 lb, AP, No. 2	Shell, HE, 60 lb, SAP	Shell, P., Concrete, 60 lb	Shell, 60 lb F
Warhead diameter	88 mm (3.5 in)		152 mm (6.0 in)		4.5 in (110 mm)
Warhead length (Note: including spigot which screws into engine)	314 mm (12.4 in)	378 mm (14.9 in)	553 mm (21.8 in)	608 mm (23.9 in)	22 in (560 mm)
Warhead weight	11.3 kg (25 lb)		27.4 kg (60 lb)	27.2 kg (60 lb)	46.9 lb (21.3 kg)
Explosive charge	none		6.35 kg (14.0 lb); TNT or Amatol 60/40	none	3 lb (1.4 kg); TNT or RDX/TNT 60/40
Engine length	1,400 mm (4 ft 7 in)				
Engine diameter	82.7 mm (3.26 in)				
Width with fins	336 mm (13.2 in)				
Overall length	1,639 mm (5 ft 4.5 in)	1,703 mm (5 ft 7.0 in)	1,880 mm (6 ft 2 in)	1,933 mm (6 ft 4.1 in)	
Weight of complete rocket (Note: with 17.2 kg (38 lb) engine)	28.5 kg (63 lb)		44.6 kg (98 lb)	44.4 kg (98 lb)	
Propellant charge	5.2 kg (11 lb) cordite				
Performance
Propellant burn time at 15 °C (59 °F)	1.6 s				
Thrust at 15 °C (59 °F)	800 kgf (1,800 lbf)				
Maximum velocity	380 m/s (1,200 ft/s)		230 m/s (750 ft/s)		
Armour penetration	88 mm (3.5 in) at 700 yd (640 m) (Note: A flight time of 0.89 seconds from aircraft travelling at 350 ft/s (240 mph; 380 km/h))				

== Aircraft use in the Second World War ==
As well as operational use, a number of aircraft were fitted with RP-3s on an experimental basis.

=== RAF and Commonwealth air forces ===
- Boeing Fortress Mk. II and IIA: (Coastal Command)
- Bristol Beaufighter Mk. VI, VIC, X and 20: (Coastal Command, South East Asia Command and Royal Australian Air Force, Pacific Theatre.)
- Consolidated Liberator B. Mk. III, VI: (Coastal Command.)
- de Havilland Mosquito F.B. Mk. VI: (Coastal Command, SEAC and RAAF, Pacific Theatre.)
- Hawker Hurricane Mk. IIE & IV: (Desert Air Force, RAF Second Tactical Air Force, SEAC.)
- Hawker Tempest
- Hawker Typhoon Mk. Ib: (2 TAF.)
- Republic P-47 Thunderbolt (USAAF used their M8 for this role instead, 6/aircraft)
- Supermarine Spitfire
- Vickers Wellington GR Mk. XIV: (Coastal Command)

=== Royal Navy Fleet Air Arm ===
- Fairey Firefly Mk. I
- Fairey Swordfish Mk. II, III
- Grumman Tarpon/Avenger Mk. I, II, III
- Hawker Sea Hurricane Mk. IIc (825 Naval Air Squadron)
- Hawker Sea Fury 807 Naval Air Squadron

== Aircraft use post Second World War ==
The 3-inch RP continued to be used on RAF and RN aircraft in the ground attack role until replaced by the SNEB podded rocket (RAF) and the 2-inch podded RP (RN).

Post war operational use included the Malayan emergency, the Korean War, the Suez Crisis, and the Radfan campaign.

=== RAF and Commonwealth air forces ===
- Bristol Brigand
- de Havilland Hornet
- de Havilland Vampire
- de Havilland Venom
- Gloster Meteor
- Hawker Hunter

=== RAAF, RAN ===
RP-3 rockets were used by Australian armed forces into the 1970s

- Bristol Beaufighter
- North American P-51 Mustang
- de Havilland Vampire
- Fairey Firefly
- Gloster Meteor
- Fairey Gannet
- Hawker Sea Fury Mk11
- de Havilland Sea Venom

=== Royal Navy Fleet Air Arm ===
- Hawker Sea Fury
- Hawker Sea Hawk
- Supermarine Attacker
- Supermarine Scimitar (Both AP and SAP-HE rockets were used)
- de Havilland Sea Vixen - up to 24 rockets total on 4 pylons, six per pylon;

=== Swedish Air Force ===
- North American T-6 Texan (Sk 16) - 4 rockets total on 2 pylons
- Saab 17 (B 17A) - 4 rockets total on 4 pylons)
- Saab 18 (A & T 18B) - 8-12 rockets total on 8-9 pylons
- Saab 21 (A 21A-3) - 8 rockets total on 2 pylons)
- Saab 21R (A 21RA, RB) - 10 rockets total on 1 pylon
- de Havilland Vampire (J 28B, C) - 8 rockets total on 4 pylons
- Saab 29 Tunnan (J 29A, B, E, F) - 8 rockets total on 8 pylons
- Saab 32 Lansen (A 32A) - 12 rockets total on 12 pylons

== See also ==
- M8 American air-ground barrage rocket, 4.5-inch (110 mm) calibre
- Land Mattress
- Tiny Tim, an American 11.75-inch (298 mm) calibre, 1,255-pound (569 kg) mass unguided rocket projectile
