= De Havilland Sea Vixen =

Carrier-based fighter aircraft family

DH.110 Sea Vixen
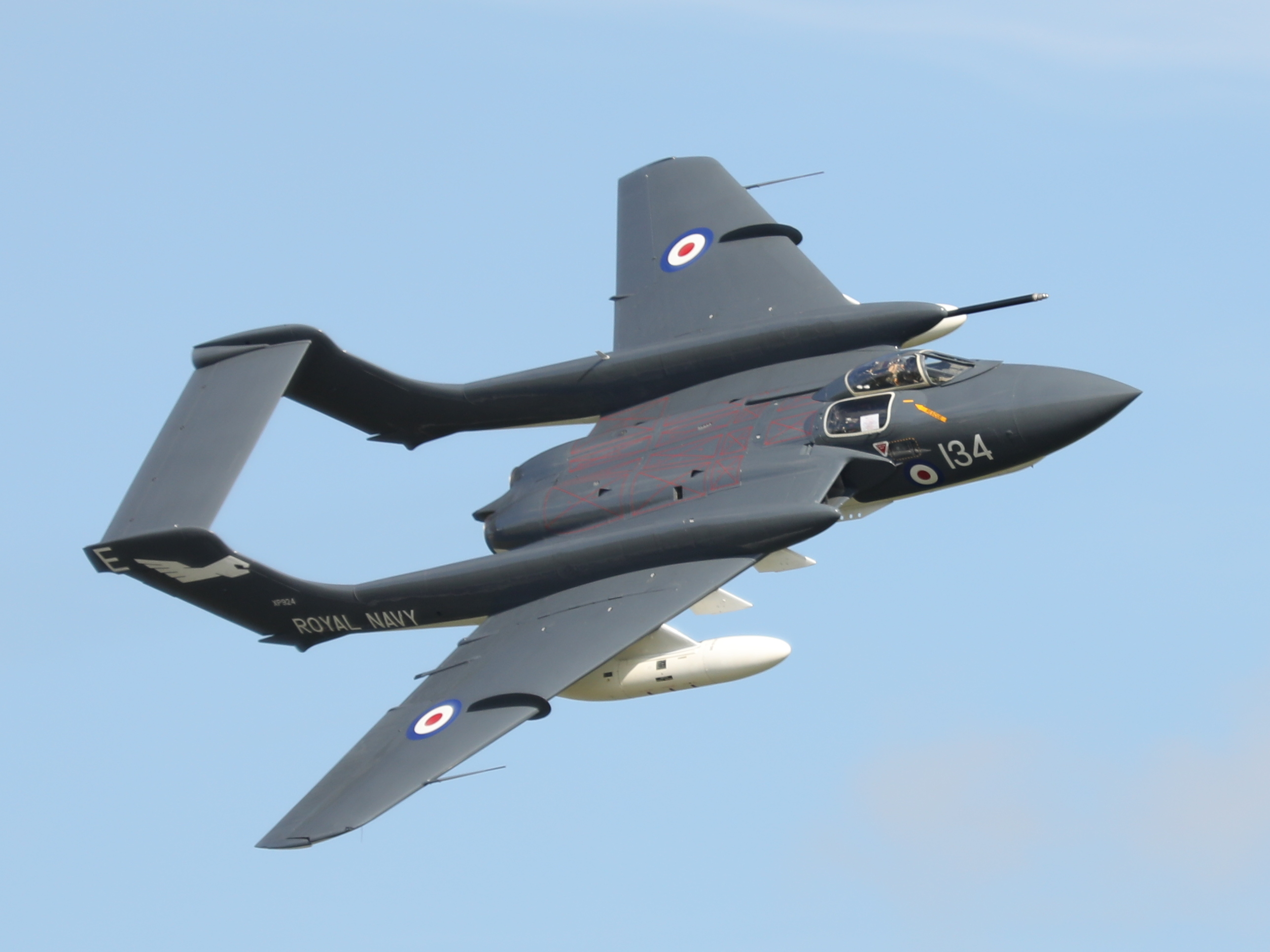
- The last airworthy Sea Vixen at RNAS Yeovilton, 2014

General information
- Type: Carrier-based fighter
- National origin: United Kingdom
- Manufacturer: de Havilland
- Primary user: Royal Navy
- Number built: 151 (including two DH110 prototypes and one Sea Vixen prototype)

History
- Introduction date: July 1959
- First flight: 26 September 1951
- Retired: 1972

The de Havilland DH.110 Sea Vixen is a British twin-engine, twin boom-tailed, two-seat, carrier-based fleet air-defence fighter flown by the Fleet Air Arm of the Royal Navy from the 1950s to the early 1970s. The Sea Vixen was designed by the de Havilland Aircraft Company during the late 1940s at its Hatfield factory in Hertfordshire, developed from the company's earlier first generation jet fighters. (Note: The Sea Vixen was the final and largest development of the de Havilland Vampire and de Havilland Venom family) It was later called the Hawker Siddeley Sea Vixen after de Havilland was absorbed by the Hawker Siddeley Corporation in 1960.

The Sea Vixen had the distinction of being the first British two-seat combat aircraft to achieve supersonic speed, albeit not in level flight. Operating from British aircraft carriers, it was used in combat over Tanganyika and over Yemen during the Aden Emergency. In 1972, the Sea Vixen was retired in favour of the American-made McDonnell Douglas Phantom FG.1 interceptor. There have been no flying Sea Vixens since 2017.

== Development ==
=== Origins ===
In 1946, the de Havilland Aircraft Company conducted discussions with the British Admiralty on its requirements for a future jet-powered all-weather, radar-equipped fighter. From these talks, it became clear that the aircraft would need a crew of two to handle its radar and navigation equipment, as well as to fly the fighter, and that two engines were required for safety over the ocean, and that swept wings were desirable. The fighter would also have a moderate wing loading for manoeuvrability at altitude and acceptable takeoff and landing performance from aircraft carriers. Highly effective wing flaps would be needed for landing and taking off. de Havilland decided to pursue development of a design to meet the Navy requirements. The proposed aircraft, the DH.110, was a twin-engined all-weather fighter.

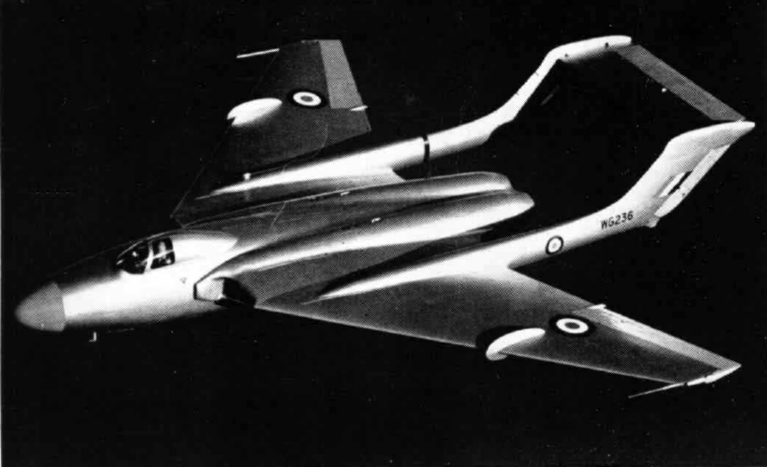
The DH.110 prototype WG236, in 1952

The design of the DH.110 uses the twin-boom-tail design layout of the de Havilland Vampire and de Havilland Venom. It has an all-metal structure, 45-degree swept wings, and an armament of four 30 mm ADEN cannons. The DH.110 was to be powered by a pair of Rolls-Royce Avon turbojets, each capable of generating 7,500 lbf (33 kN) of thrust, which would allow the aircraft to become supersonic in a shallow dive. The DH.110 had the distinction of being the first British two-seat combat plane to achieve supersonic speed.

In January 1947, specifications N.40/46 and F.44/46 were issued by the British Air Ministry for similar night fighters to equip the Fleet Air Arm (FAA) and Royal Air Force (RAF). de Havilland submitted its proposal for the DH.110 to both services. As initially submitted the RAF version had Metrovick F.9 engines, although these would soon be known as the Armstrong Siddeley Sapphire when Metrovick sold its engine division. Nine DH.110 prototypes were ordered for the RAF (together with four of the competing Gloster Javelin) and four prototypes for the Fleet Air Arm.

By early 1949 the DH.110 design was expected to fulfil four requirements: F4/48, F5/49 (a long range RAF fighter), N.40/46 (naval night fighter) and N.8/49 (naval strike aircraft). Three prototypes were needed for F.4/48, four for common RAF and RN development, and two each for the other three roles and by July the authorities were ready to order the 13 prototypes

In 1949 the Royal Navy decided to procure the de Havilland Sea Venom which, as a development of an existing aircraft, was cheaper, and would be available sooner to meet its immediate needs for a jet-powered night fighter to replace its fleet of piston-engined de Havilland Sea Hornets and Vought F4U Corsairs. The RAF decided to cut its order to two prototypes. Despite this setback, de Havilland elected to continue work on the DH.110 while trying to regain official interest in the type. On 26 September 1951, an initial prototype was completed and conducted its maiden flight from the Hatfield Aerodrome, flown by the test pilot John Cunningham. Early flight tests of the prototype demonstrated that the aircraft's performance exceeded expectations. By the following year, the prototype was regularly flying in excess of the speed of sound.

Tragedy struck while the first prototype DH.110 (serial number WG236) was demonstrated at the Farnborough Airshow on 6 September 1952. Following a demonstration of its ability to break the sound barrier during a low level flight the aircraft disintegrated and debris landed in the midst of spectators, killing 31 people including the crew of two, the test pilot John Derry and his flight-test observer, Tony Richards.

Subsequent investigation of the accident traced the failure to faulty design of the wing leading edge section ahead of the main spar. The design had been satisfactory for the earlier Vampire and Venom but not for the higher stresses induced by the rolling pull-out manoeuvre at 650 mph (1,050 km/h) flown by the DH.110 prototype at Farnborough. The leading edge skin, without the extra reinforcing structure that would be added later, buckled, which resulted in the outer portions of the swept-back wings being torn off (similar display routines had been flown on preceding days by the other prototype DH.110 which had an aerodynamic fence providing external stiffening for the skin over the area where the buckling originated.). The subsequent shift in the DH.110's centre of pressure caused the aircraft to pitch up, the cockpit and tail sections breaking away and the engines being torn from the airframe by the g loading. One of the engines hit an area crowded with spectators at the end of the runway, causing the majority of the deaths. Sixty other spectators were injured by debris from the cockpit landing close to the main spectator enclosures along the runway. This incident led to new safety regulations for air shows in the UK, and no member of the public died as a result of a British airshow flight for more than 62 years, until the crash of a Hawker Hunter warbird killed 11 people during the Shoreham Air Show on 22 August 2015.

=== Redesign and navalisation ===
In response to the loss of the first prototype de Havilland introduced modifications to the design which were implemented on the remaining second prototype. These changes included the adoption of an all-moving tailplane, and cambered leading edge extensions. The modified prototype did not return to flight until July 1954. As a result of these changes the DH.110 was no longer able to exceed the speed of sound, only reaching Mach 0.95 in a steep dive where its controls were immovable until passing 10,000 feet (3,000 m). By this time, the Royal Air Force announced the abandonment of its interest in the DH.110, after deciding to buy the Gloster Javelin instead. The Fleet Air Arm had decided that it would adopt the aircraft as a replacement for its interim fleet of Sea Venoms. In February 1955, an order was placed for 110 naval aircraft, which received the name Sea Vixen.

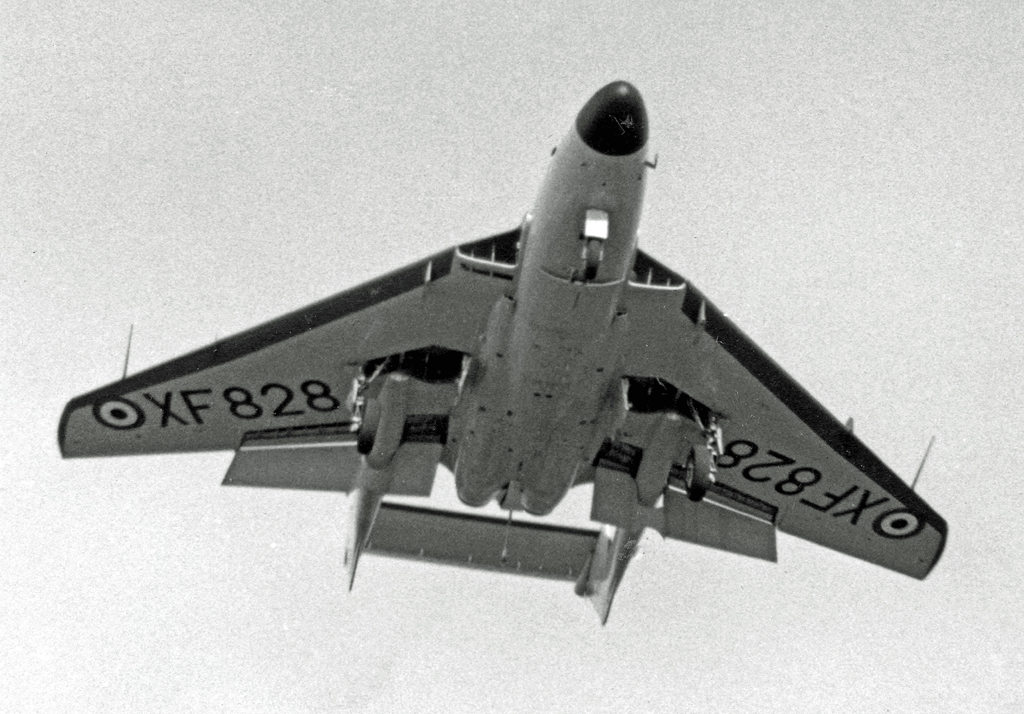
The third semi-navalised prototype demonstrating at the 1955 Farnborough Air Show

Along with tailoring the aircraft for carrier-based operation by the Royal Navy, de Havilland implemented major changes to the Sea Vixen during its redesign. Throughout the 1950s, when the DH.110 design was still being evolved, major advances had occurred in subsystems such as weaponry, fire-control systems, radar equipment, and cockpit instruments. The concept of an aircraft being an integrated weapons system had proliferated, where sensors such as the radar would be more directly tied to navigation and weapons systems. de Havilland included this concept in the design of the Sea Vixen. According to aviation author David Hobbs, it was the first British fighter aircraft to be designed in this manner.

In June 1955, a semi-navalised prototype, XF828, was completed for conducting carrier flight deck suitability trials. XF828 had several changes, including the alteration of the profile of the wing leading edges and the strengthening of the wings, as well as underwing fixture points for catapult launches, and a tailhook for arrested landings; the prototype lacked a wing folding mechanism, or racks for armaments. On 20 June 1955, this aircraft made its first flight from de Havilland's facility at Christchurch Airfield in Dorset. The following year, XF828 performed its first arrested deck landing on the Royal Navy's aircraft carrier HMS Ark Royal.

In April 1956, the finalised production drawings were formally issued. The fully naval production Sea Vixen had improvements over earlier development models. These included the addition of a powered folding wing system, reinforcement of the landing gear to withstand the additional stresses of carrier landings, a steerable nose wheel, a revised tail unit, and the redesigning of the fuselage to carry armament. On 20 March 1957, the first true Sea Vixen, the Sea Vixen FAW.20 (fighter all-weather, later renamed FAW.1), performed its first flight. This aircraft was promptly used for clearance trials, in particular for addressing handling problems; the second production aircraft was used for engineering trials and the third aircraft for conducting radar trials. On 2 July 1959, the first Sea Vixen-equipped squadron was formed.

Production Sea Vixens were manufactured at first by de Havilland at its former Second World War Airspeed Ltd. "shadow factory" at Christchurch near Bournemouth, starting in March 1957. In August 1962, all production was moved to another de Havilland factory at Hawarden, near Chester.

=== Further development ===
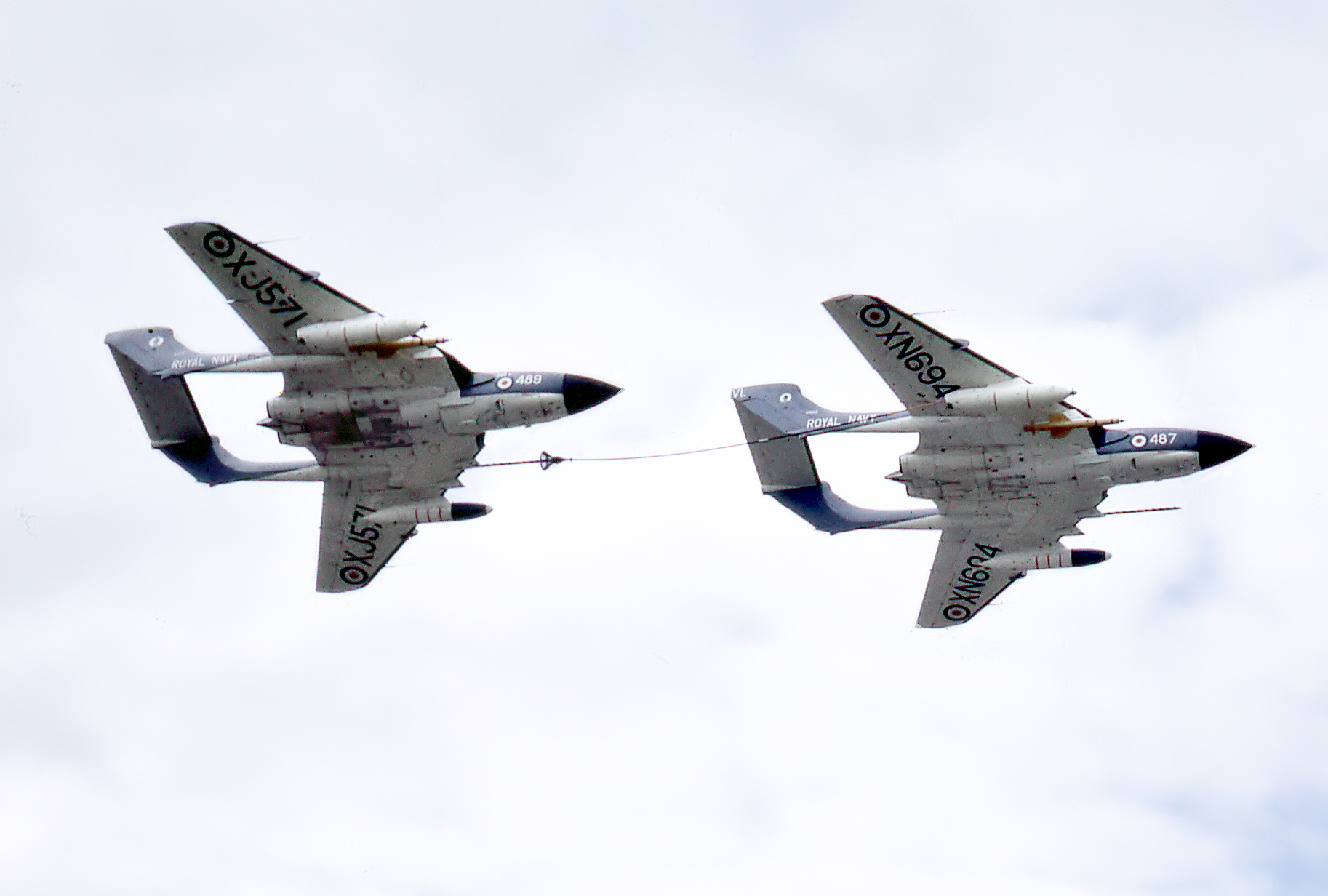
Two Sea Vixen FAW.1 (XJ571 & XN694) of 899 Sqn, one refuelling the other at a 1960s Farnborough Air Show

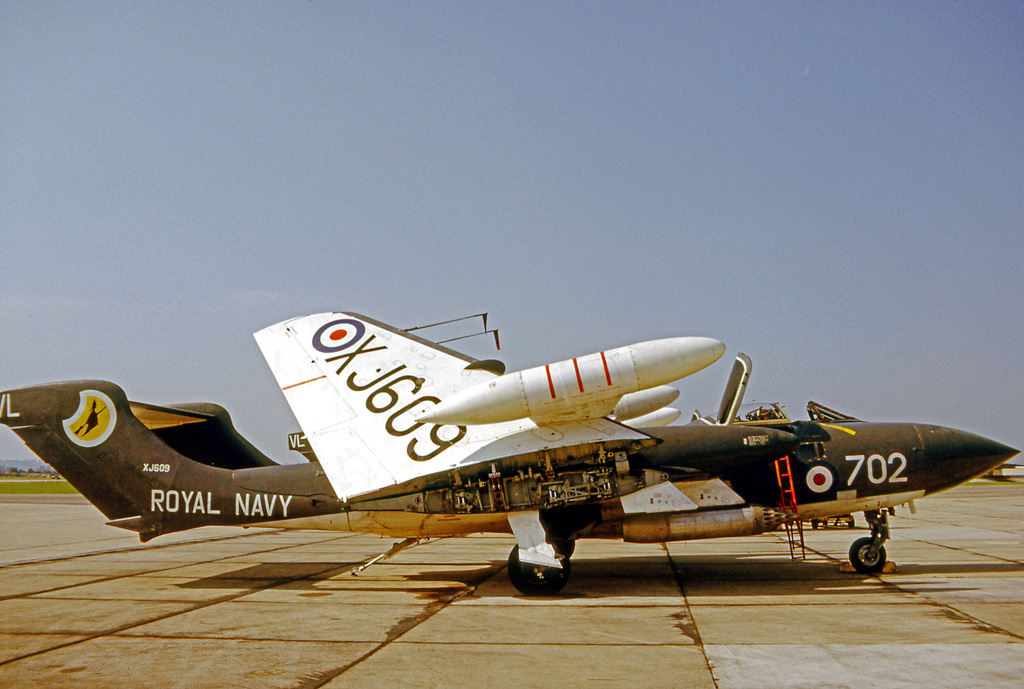
Sea Vixen FAW.2 of 890 NAS Squadron at RNAS Yeovilton in 1971

Beyond the initial FAW.1 model, de Havilland proceeded with the development of an improved variant, that became the Sea Vixen FAW.2. This served as the successor to the FAW.1 and included many improvements. As well as Firestreak missiles, it could carry the Red Top air-to-air missile, four RP-2 rocket pods, and the AGM-12 Bullpup air-to-ground missile.

Its enlarged tail boom allowed for additional fuel tanks in the "pinion" extensions above and in front of the wing leading edge, there was an improved escape system and additional room for more electronic countermeasures (ECM) equipment. The changes in aerodynamics meant that the 1,000 lb bomb could no longer be carried. Visually the FAW.1 and FAW.2 could be distinguished by the tail booms which extended forward over the wing leading edges of the FAW.2.

In 1962, the Sea Vixen FAW.2 conducted its maiden flight; the type entered service with frontline squadrons in 1964. A total of 29 FAW.2s were newly built along with a further 67 FAW.1s that were rebuilt to FAW.2 standard. In 1966, the original FAW.1 begun to be phased out and in 1972, the career of the Sea Vixen FAW.2 came to an end.

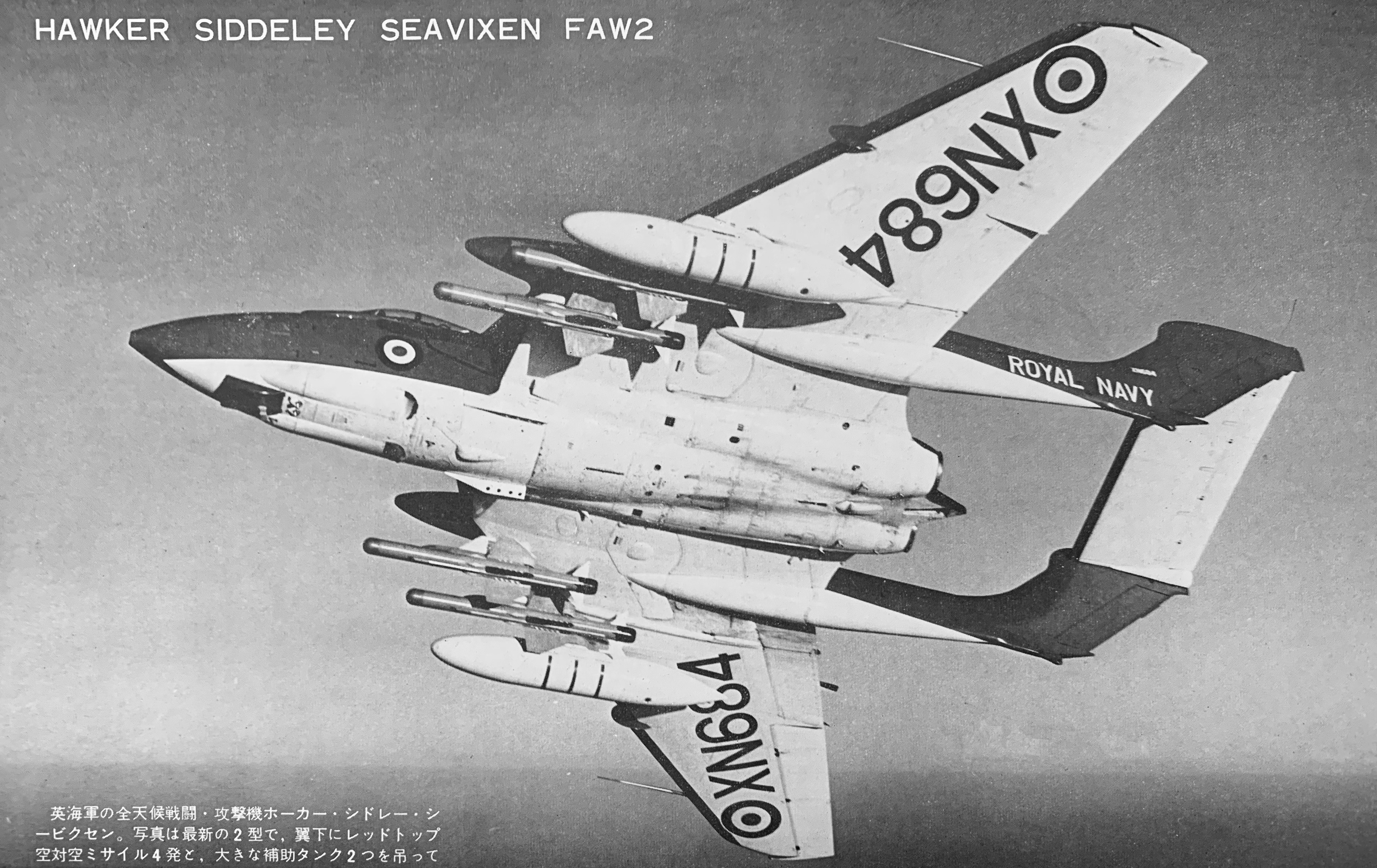
The Sea Vixen FAW2 prototype with four Red Top missiles.

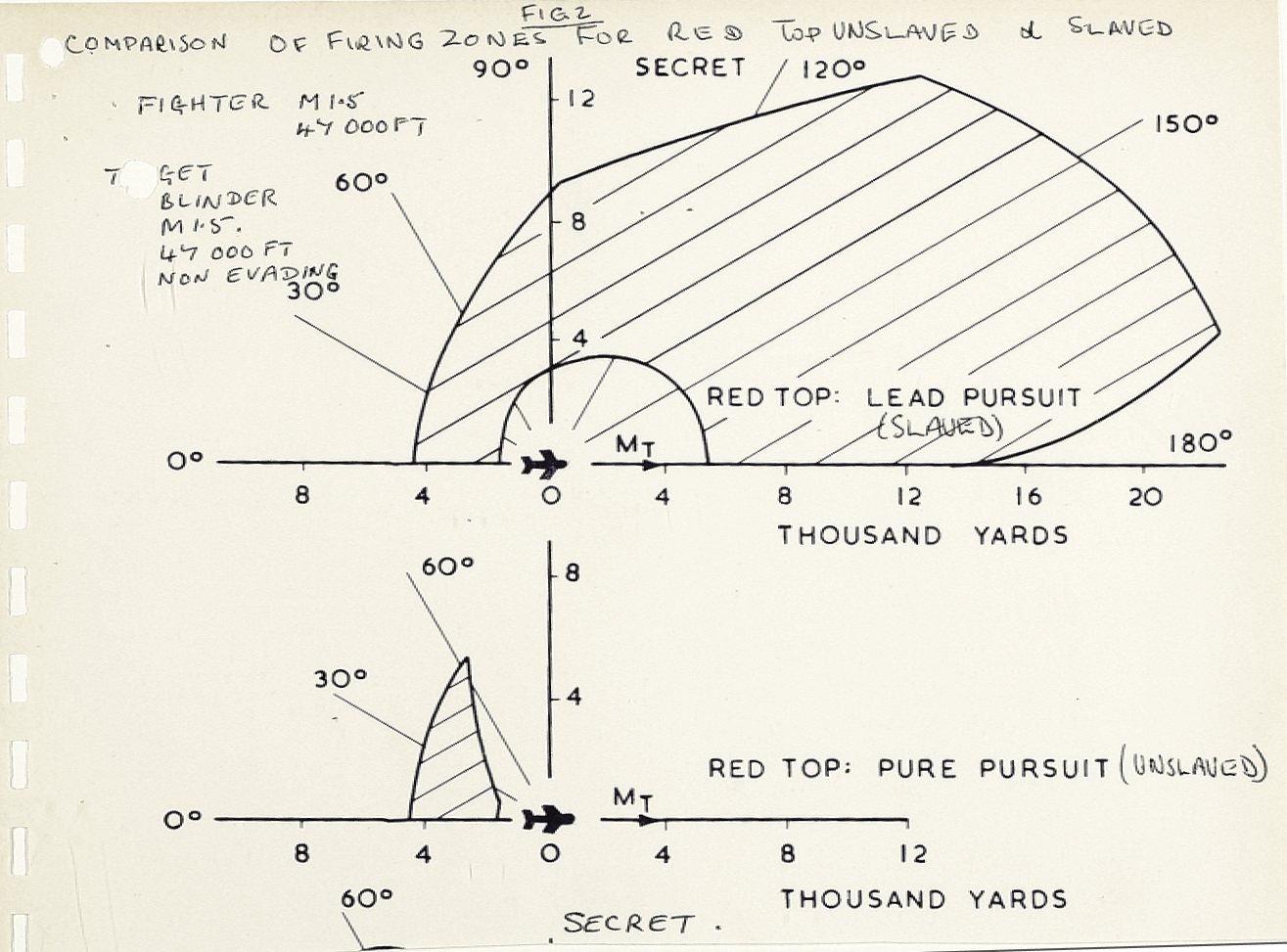
A declassified 1965 UK MoD drawing that shows the Red Top's firing zone from a Lightning at Mach 1.5 at 47,000 feet altitude against a Tu-22 Blinder at the same speed and altitude. The firing zone from a Sea Vixen FAW2 would have been smaller due to the Sea Vixen FAW2's slower speed. Courtesy of secretprojects.co.uk member GUNDAM123dx.

The Sea Vixen FAW2 could be armed with up to four Red Top infrared-homing missiles. The Red Top could home on to heat sources generated by kinetic heating of a fast-approaching supersonic target such as the Tupolev Tu-22 bomber. The Red Top system was integrated into the AI 18R (R for Red Top) radar. From 1969 the Sea Vixen FAW2 practised intercepts of a supersonic target against the Concorde SST in flight tests over the Irish Sea.

The Admiralty had planned to replace the Sea Vixen with the McDonnell Douglas Phantom FG.1. The aircraft carriers HMS Ark Royal and Eagle were both planned to be refitted to properly carry and fly the new fighters. Due to defence cuts, and following the decommissioning of HMS Eagle, only HMS Ark Royal underwent the conversion to fly the new Phantom FG.1.

A small number of Sea Vixens subsequently saw service as drones, as the Sea Vixen D.3. Only four aircraft were converted to the D.3 standard, though three more were dispatched to Farnborough to undergo conversion, but ultimately went unconverted. The last remaining airworthy Sea Vixen (XP924) was a D3 conversion. A number of other Sea Vixens became target tugs as the Sea Vixen TT.2.

== Design ==
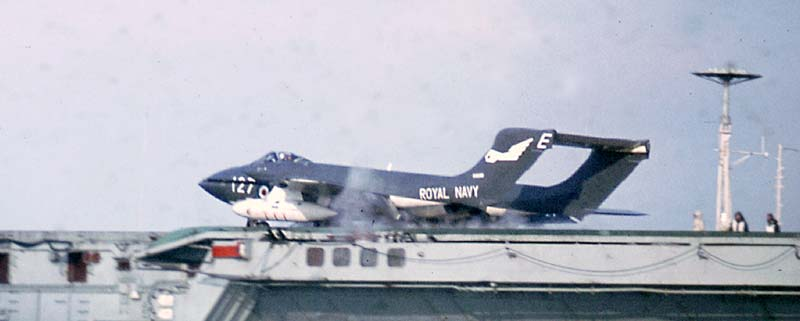
899 Sqn Sea Vixen FAW.2 on HMS Eagle, 1970

The de Havilland Sea Vixen was a jet-powered fleet defence fighter, equipped with a modern radar and air-to-air missiles for its primary role. When it entered service, it was the first British aircraft to be solely armed with missiles, rockets and bombs; this made it the first fighter aircraft operated by the Fleet Air Arm with no gun armament. The Sea Vixen FAW.1 was armed with four de Havilland Firestreak air-to-air missiles, while the Sea Vixen FAW.2 could also carry the later, more capable Red Top missile. The original DH.110 design offered to the RAF was armed with four cannon before soon being replaced with an all-missile armament. The Red Top homing head was pointed in the direction of the target by slaving it to the AI18 radar, which was operated by the observer.

In addition to its principal fleet-defence role, the Sea Vixen was also used in the ground-attack role for which it could be armed with two Microcell unguided two-inch (51 mm) rocket packs, Bullpup air-to-ground missiles, and four 500 pounds (230 kg) or two 1,000 pounds (450 kg) bombs. The Sea Vixen was equipped with a refuelling probe for aerial refuelling from tanker aircraft to extend its range. It could also be equipped as a tanker for refuelling other aircraft. The Sea Vixen FAW.1 was cleared to carry the Red Beard free-fall nuclear bomb in the event of an "extreme operational emergency".

The Sea Vixen was powered by a pair of Rolls-Royce Avon 208 turbojet engines and could reach a maximum speed of 690 mph (1,110 km/h) and a range of up to 600 mi (970 km). It had a twin-boom tail configuration, as used on the earlier de Havilland Sea Vampire and Sea Venom fighter aircraft. The internal volume of the tail boom was used for both fuel and avionics, and was considerably enlarged for this purpose on the improved Sea Vixen FAW.2. The twin-boom tail reduced the length and height of the aircraft, which reduced the stowage area and head-room required onboard aircraft carriers; it also minimised asymmetry during single engine flying, reduced the length of the jet pipes and improved maintenance access.

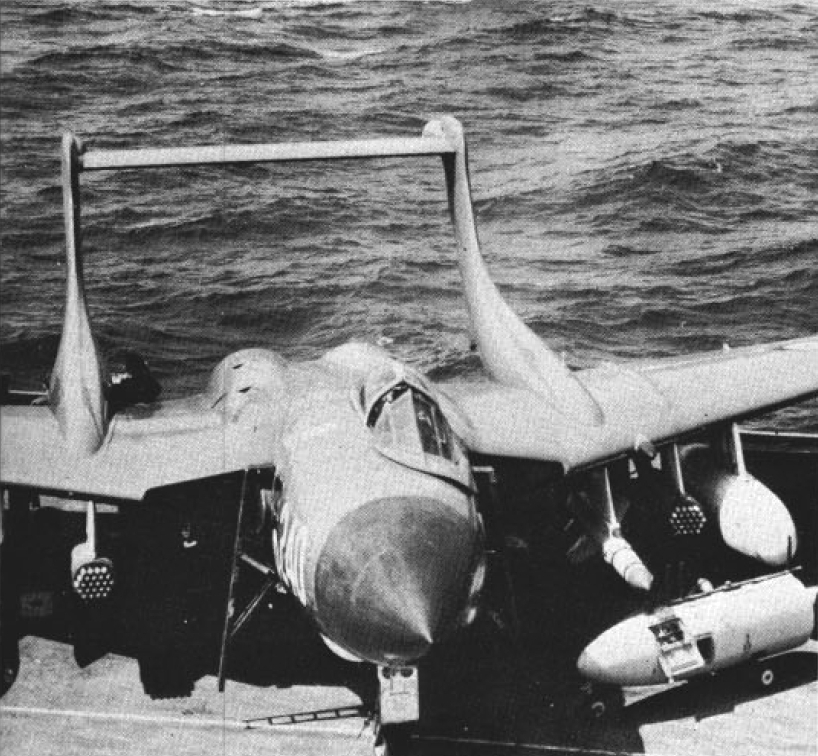
Sea Vixen on the US Navy's USS Forrestal in 1962, clearly showing the asymmetric cockpit layout. A Palouste air starter pod is in front.

The fuselage comprises several sections, the principal being the one-piece central and stub-wing assembly section. The front fuselage, composed of the pressurised cabin, the airbrake below the pressure flooring and the radar compartment, and its hinged radome are mounted upon four attachments on the forward face of the front spar. Various electrical compartments are located aft of the front spar, above the wing, which are accessible through hatches. The engines are installed within the main fuselage aft of the main box; they could be removed from the fuselage for servicing via detachable panels on the upper fuselage surface. Sections of the fuselage skin were chemically milled while other parts were machine milled. The powered folding wing made use of a pair of wing-fold joints which involved a total of six main attachment points.

The Sea Vixen had a crew of two, a pilot and a radar operator. The pilot's canopy was offset to the left-hand side of the fuselage, while the radar operator sat to the right completely within the fuselage, the latter gaining access to his position through a flush-fitting top hatch, nicknamed the "Coal Hole". (Note: "Observer" is the FAA term for the navigator/radar operator – the US Navy's equivalent is the radar intercept officer (RIO).) The observer's position was darkened and located deeper down into the fuselage, improving the visibility of the radar imagery. Both positions were fitted with fully automated height adjustable Martin-Baker Mk.4 ejector seats, which were capable of being deployed under a range of conditions and circumstances, including the aircraft being submerged in water. Each crew member had a single centralised service connector comprising circuits that served ventilated g-suits as well as controls for humidity and temperature for crew comfort. The windscreen of the pilot's canopy had a 'knife edge' positioned in center for rain and weather shedding.

The flying controls of the Sea Vixen were relatively complex with a fully powered tailplane, ailerons, and rudder; these controls remained usable even in the absence of electrical power, such as in the event of a double engine failure. Actuation of the powered flight control surfaces was provided by a pair of independent hydraulic systems and typically featured variable gearing of control movements over differing speeds. An intricate three-section flap arrangement was employed, partially due to the nature of the wing's geometry. The navigation, flight instrumentation and communications equipment included ground and air position indicators, a reference gyro, an autopilot capable of maintaining altitude and speed as well as yaw and pitch damping, tactical air navigation system (TACAN), and ultra high frequency (UHF) radio system.

== Operational history ==
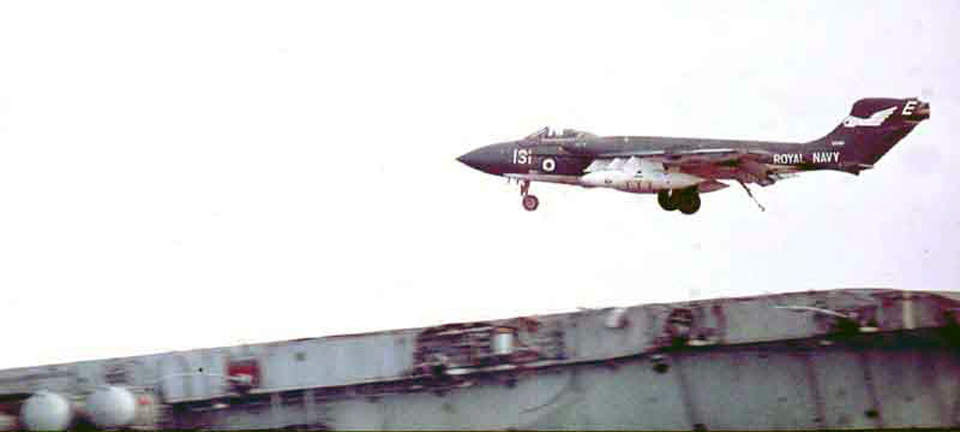
A Sea Vixen landing on HMS Eagle in 1970

The aircraft did not take part in any true wars during its career with the Fleet Air Arm though it took part in many operations. In 1961, President Abdul Karim Kassem of Iraq threatened to annex the neighbouring oil-rich state of Kuwait. In response to Kuwait's appeal for external help, the United Kingdom dispatched a number of ships to the region, including two fleet carriers. Sea Vixens aboard the fleet carriers flew patrols in the region, and Kassem's aggressive actions wilted in the face of the strong naval presence, thus averting a war over Kuwait.

In January 1964, trouble flared in the East African state of Tanganyika after the 1st and 2nd Tanganyika Rifles mutinied against the British officers and NCOs who, despite Tanganyika being independent, still commanded the regiment. The mutineers also seized the British High Commissioner and the airport at the capital Dar es Salaam. The UK responded by sending the light fleet carrier HMS Centaur, accompanied by 45 Commando, Royal Marines. The Sea Vixens, flying off Centaur, performed a number of duties including the providing of cover for the Royal Marines who were landed in Tanganyika by helicopters. The operation "to restore Tanganyika to stability" ended in success. That same year, Sea Vixens of HMS Centaur saw service once again in the Persian Gulf, including the launch of air strikes against rebel forces, this time supporting British forces fighting against locals disgruntled by the loss of tolls in the Radfan. Later in 1964, HMS Centaur's 892 Squadron Sea Vixens stationed off Indonesia, helped to prevent an escalation of President Sukarno's Indonesia–Malaysia confrontation.

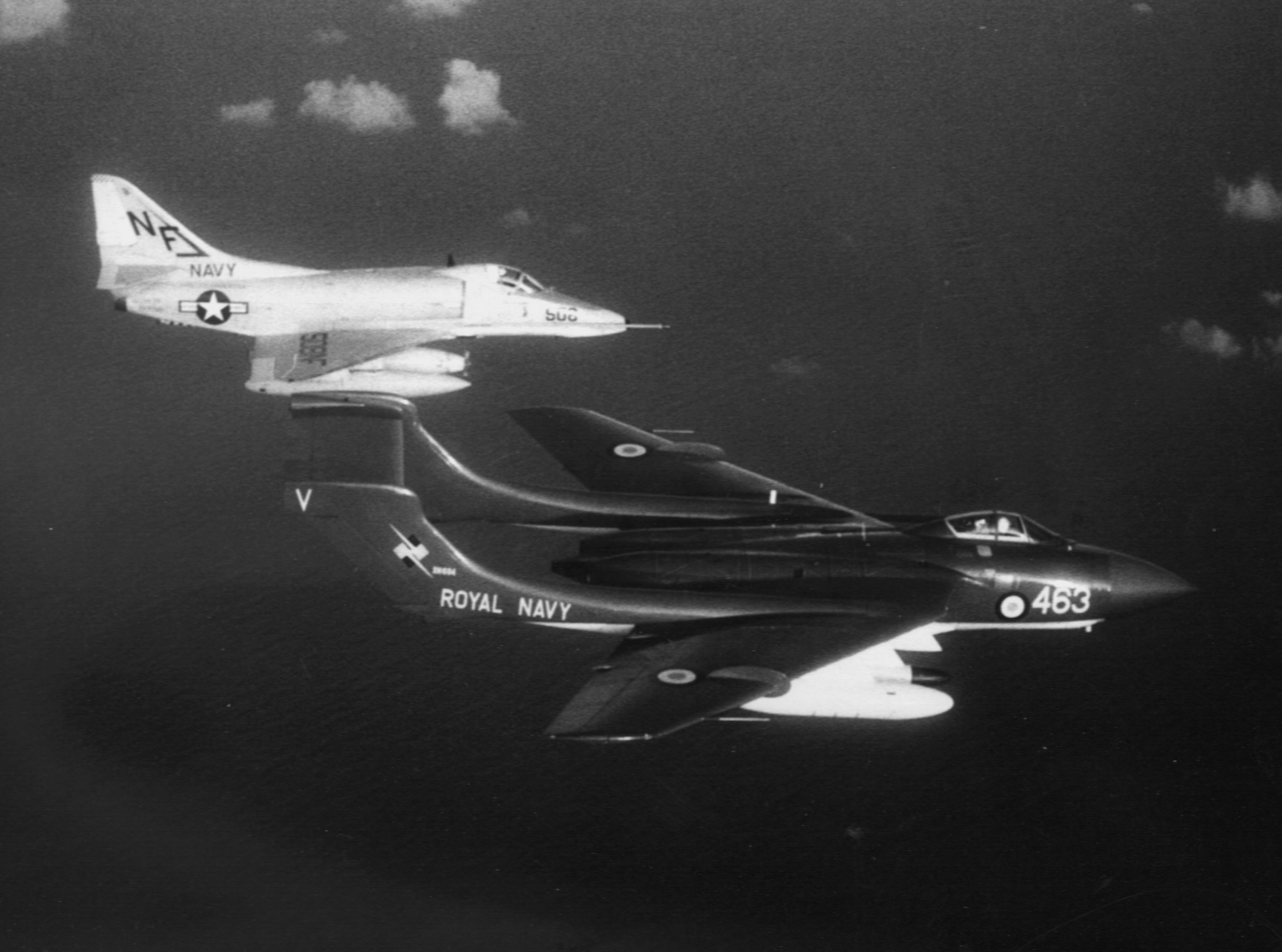
Sea Vixen of 893 NAS operating alongside an A-4 Skyhawk of VA-55 in 1964

Sea Vixens saw further service during the 1960s, performing duties on Beira Patrol, a Royal Navy operation designed to prevent oil reaching landlocked Rhodesia via the then Portuguese colony of Mozambique. The Sea Vixen also saw service in the Far East. In 1967, once again in the Persian Gulf, Sea Vixens helped cover the withdrawal from Aden. There were a number of Royal Navy warships involved, including the carriers HMS Albion, HMS Bulwark and HMS Eagle (carrying the Sea Vixens) and the LPD (Landing Platform Dock) HMS Fearless.

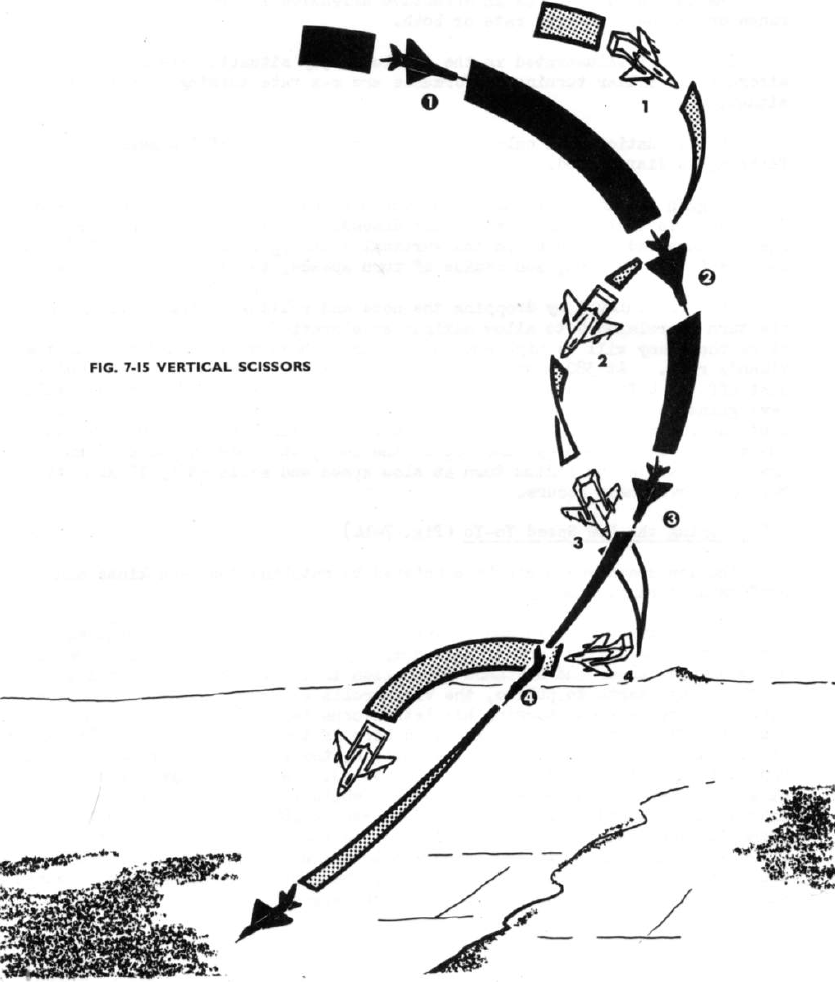
A Sea Vixen manoeuvring against a MiG-21 shown in the Tactical Manual

The Sea Vixen's tactics against faster supersonic fighters such as the BAC Lightning and the Dassault Mirage III was to keep turning until its opponents went low on fuel and then catch them with the Red Top when they tried to break away using afterburner.

The Sea Vixen also flew in an aerobatic role, performing in two Royal Navy display teams: Simon's Sircus and Fred's Five.

Of the 145 Sea Vixens constructed, 55 were lost in accidents. Two DH.110 development prototypes were also lost. The 55 Sea Vixens lost represented a loss rate of almost 38%. 30 (54%) of these were fatal incidents, 21 of which involved the death of both pilot and observer.

A small number of Sea Vixens were sent to FR Aviation at Tarrant Rushton airfield for conversion to D.3 drone standard, with some undergoing testing at RAF Llanbedr before the drone programme was abandoned. Among them was XP924, now G-CVIX, the only Sea Vixen to remain in flying condition, which has now been returned to 899 NAS colours. Formerly owned and operated by De Havilland Aviation, G-CVIX could be viewed at their hangar at Bournemouth Airport in Dorset and at air shows around the UK. The Air Accident Investigation Branch published an enquiry into damage suffered by G-CVIX on landing at Bournemouth on 5 April 2012. On 16 September 2014, G-CVIX was transferred to Naval Aviation Ltd., a subsidiary of Fly Navy Heritage Trust and will be based at the Royal Naval Air Station Yeovilton in Somerset.

== Operators ==
United Kingdom

- Royal Navy Fleet Air Arm

Sea Vixen FAW.1 units
Squadron/Flight	From	First on carrier	To	Codes	Comment
700 Sqn Y Flight	November 1958	Never	2 July 1959	?	Intensive Flying Trials Unit (IFTU) based at RNAS Yeovilton. Reformed as 892 Sqn.
892 Sqn	2 July 1959	3 March 1960; Ark Royal	1965	208–219	Flew from: Ark Royal, Victorious, Hermes and Centaur (late 1963 to mid-1965, the fourth and last commission of the ship)
890 Sqn	1 February 1960	July 1960; Hermes	1966	240–254	Flew from: Hermes and Ark Royal. Disbanded 1966, reformed September 1967 initially with four FAW.1, and converting to FAW.2.
893 Sqn	9 September 1960	Ark Royal	1964	455–468	Flew from: Victorious, with short periods on: Ark Royal and Centaur.
899 Sqn	1 February 1961	?	1965	485–489	Sea Vixen HQ Sqn Yeovilton, with short periods on: Eagle. 899 was the first squadron to evaluate and operate Sea Vixen FAW2 aircraft
766B Training Sqn	October 1959	1964 Eagle post refit trials	1965?	710–722	1962 renamed Naval Air Fighter School; provided a/c and crews for "Fred's Five" aerobatic team, all of whom were instructors on 766 squadron.

Sea Vixen FAW.2 units
Squadron/ Flight	From	First on carrier	To	Codes	Comment
13 JSTU	April 1964	Never	February 1966		13 Joint Service Trials Unit (13 JSTU). Red Top trials at Hatfield and A&AEE Boscombe Down.
899 Sqn	December 1963	December 1964; Eagle	February 1972	120–127; 130–137	Flew from: Eagle. Last operational carrier embarked Sea Vixen squadron
766 Sqn	7 July 1965	Never?	10 February 1970? (Note: Fiddler 1985, Table 4 says that 766 Sqn disbanded 10 February 1970.) (Note: Birtles 1986, p. 107 says that 766 Sqn disbanded 10 December 1970. It is not known which date for 766 Sqn disbanding is correct.)	700–707; 710–717; 720–727	Naval Air Fighter School, RNAS Yeovilton
893 Sqn	4 November 1965	19 April 1966; Victorious	July 1970	240–247; 250–257	Flew from: Victorious, RNAS Yeovilton, RAF Akrotiri, then Hermes.
892 Sqn	1963	Hermes	October 1968	301–315	Flew from Hermes. 1968 Simon's Sircus aerobatic team from this squadron performed at the 1968 Farnborough Air Show.
890 Sqn	September 1967	Never	6 August 1971	750–755 (Note: Fiddler 1985, Table 4 says 750–755 initially, with 001-007 and 010-014 during a brief period on Ark Royal in 1964–65, and 701–706 from 1971.) (Note: Birtles 1986, p. 107 says that 890 Sqn was disbanded in 1966 and reformed in 1967. Further research is required here.)	Trials and operations unit at Yeovilton with mix of FAW.1 and FAW.2. For a short period 1964-5 Ark Royal.
FRU	6 August 1971?	Never	1 December 1972	750–755	Fleet Requirements Unit (FRU). When 890 Sqn disbanded some aircraft passed to Fleet Requirements Unit (FRU), Yeovilton. FRU became Fleet Requirements and Aircraft Direction Unit (FRADU) on 1 December 1972.
FRADU	1 December 1972	Never	January 1974	750–755	Fleet Requirements and Aircraft Direction Unit (FRADU). Retired Sea Vixen on grounds of cost. January 1974.

== Surviving aircraft ==
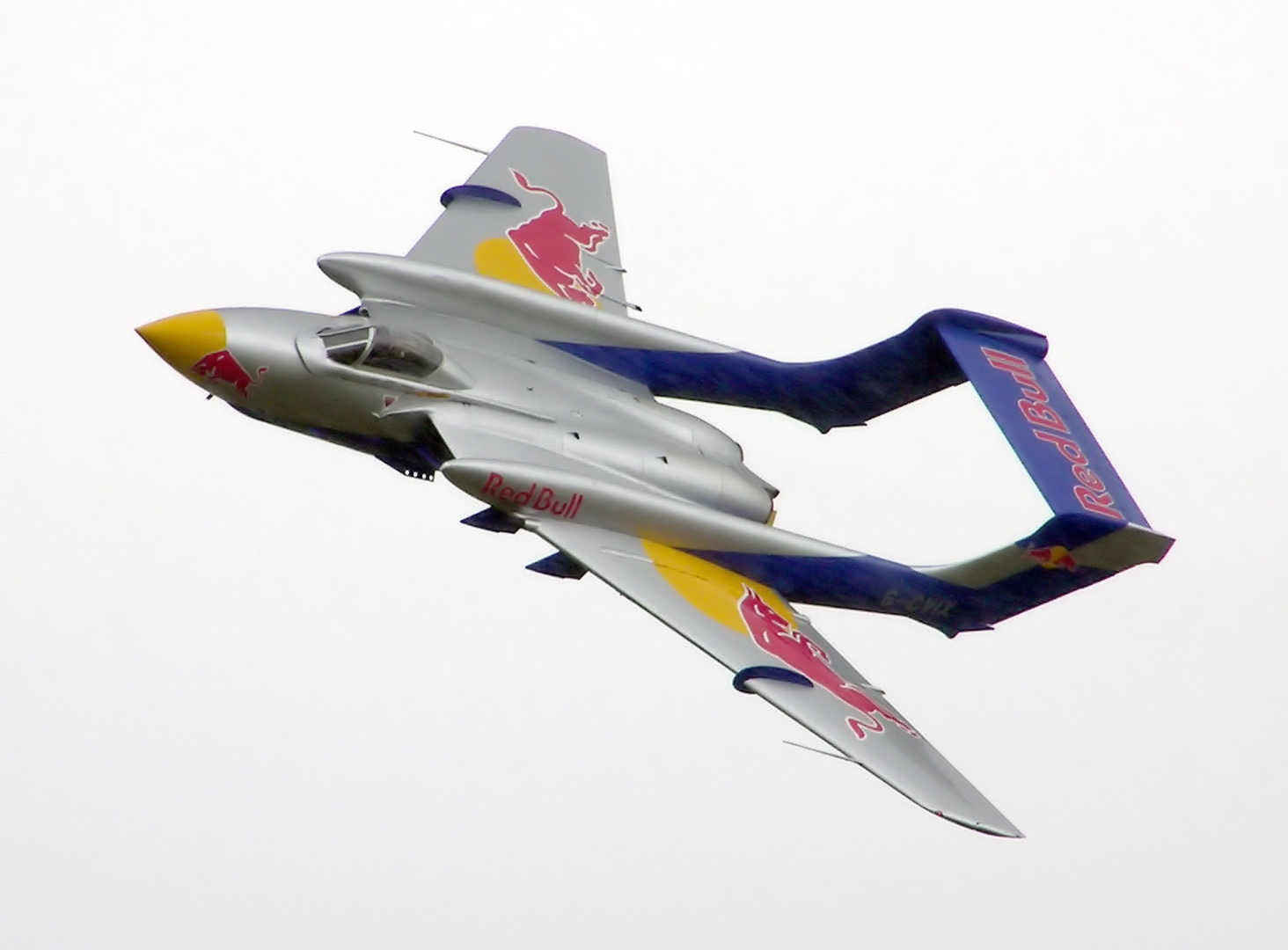
De Havilland Sea Vixen in sponsored livery at a 2004 airshow

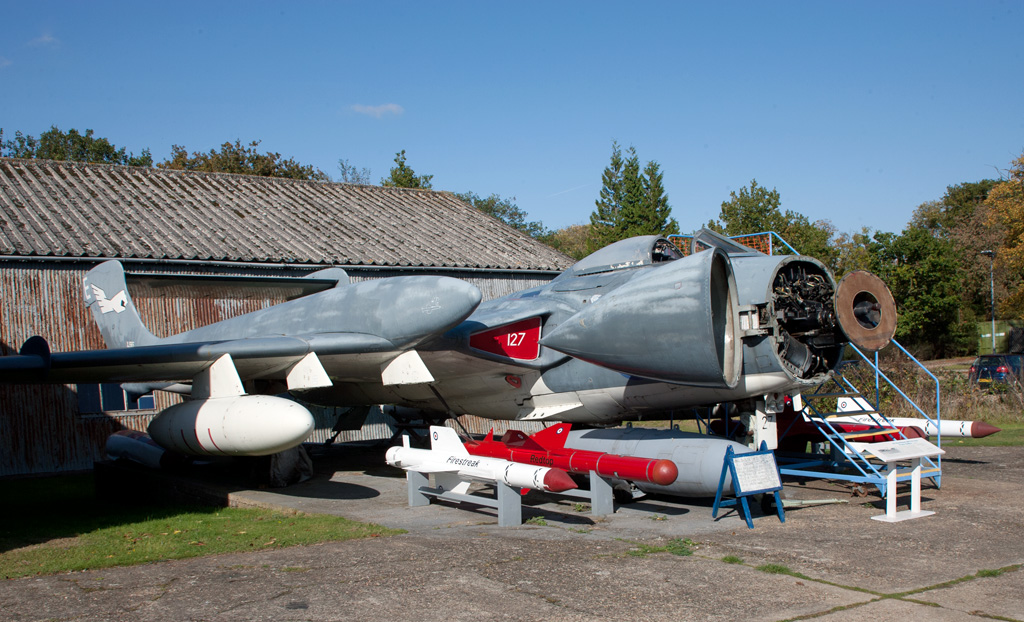
Sea Vixen on display at the de Havilland Aircraft Museum

Aircraft formerly on public display:

- Sea Vixen FAW.1 XJ481, Fleet Air Arm Museum, RNAS Yeovilton, Somerset. Part of the Museum's reserve collection, and is in storage at Cobham Hall.
- Sea Vixen FAW.2 XJ494, owned and maintained by Classic British Jets Collection, and was on display at Bruntingthorpe Aerodrome, Leicestershire until they closed in June 2020.
- Sea Vixen D.3 G-CVIX, the former XP924, registered until 2014 to DS Aviation (UK) at Bournemouth Airport, Dorset. It has a display of registration mark exemption to fly in its original Royal Navy markings as "XP924" coded "134". It originally flew with 899 Naval Air Squadron Fleet Air Arm as "134" from November 1968 until 1970 from HMS Eagle. The ownership of XP924 moved to the Fly Navy Heritage Trust – with a formal donation ceremony at RNAS Yeovilton on 16 September 2014 – to be maintained and operated from Yeovilton by Naval Aviation Ltd., a subsidiary of Fly Navy Heritage Trust. On 27 May 2017, XP924 performed an emergency wheels-up landing at Yeovilton after a hydraulic failure. The pilot was uninjured during the belly-landing. In November 2020, the trust announced that fundraising efforts and ongoing investment to return XP924 to flying condition had been suspended indefinitely.

The following complete airframes are on public display:

=== Australia ===
- Sea Vixen FAW.2 XJ490, Queensland Air Museum, Caloundra, Australia. Airframe complete, but internals removed.

=== United Kingdom ===
- Sea Vixen FAW.1 XJ482, Norfolk and Suffolk Aviation Museum, Suffolk. The first Sea Vixen delivered to the Royal Navy.
- Sea Vixen FAW.2 XJ560, Newark Air Museum, Nottinghamshire.
- Sea Vixen FAW.2 XJ565, de Havilland Aircraft Museum, Hertfordshire.
- Sea Vixen FAW.2 XJ571, Solent Sky, Hampshire.
- Sea Vixen FAW.2 XJ580, Tangmere Military Aviation Museum, West Sussex.
- Sea Vixen FAW.2 XN685, Midland Air Museum, Coventry.
- Sea Vixen FAW.2 XS576, IWM Duxford, Cambridgeshire.
- Sea Vixen TT.2 XS587, Gatwick Aviation Museum, Surrey.
- Sea Vixen FAW.2 XS590, Fleet Air Arm Museum, RNAS Yeovilton, Somerset. The last production Sea Vixen, built in 1966.

== Specifications (Sea Vixen FAW.2) ==

Data from The Great Book of Fighters

General characteristics

- Crew: 2
- Length: 55 ft 7 in (16.94 m)
- Wingspan: 51 ft 0 in (15.54 m)
- Height: 10 ft 9 in (3.28 m)
- Wing area: 648 sq ft (60.2 m^{2})
- Airfoil: EC1040
- Empty weight: 27,950 lb (12,678 kg)
- Gross weight: 41,575 lb (18,858 kg)
- Max takeoff weight: 46,750 lb (21,205 kg)
- Powerplant: 2 × Rolls-Royce Avon 208 turbojet engines, 11,000 lbf (49 kN) thrust each

Performance

- Maximum speed: 690 mph (1,110 km/h, 600 kn)
- Maximum speed: Mach 0.91
- Range: 790 mi (1,270 km, 690 nmi) on internals
- Service ceiling: 48,000 ft (15,000 m)
- Rate of climb: 9,000 ft/min (46 m/s)
- Wing loading: 64.2 lb/sq ft (313 kg/m^{2})
- Thrust/weight: 0.54

Armament

- Hardpoints: 6 , with provisions to carry combinations of:
  - Rockets: 4 × Matra rocket pods with 18 SNEB 68 mm rockets each, or 4 × Microcell rocket pods with 24 or 32 2-inch RP rockets. or 24 3-inch RP-3 rockets,
  - Missiles: 4 × Red Top or Firestreak air-to-air missiles; 2 × AGM-12 Bullpup air-to-ground missiles
  - Bombs: 1 × Red Beard freefall nuclear bomb, or four 500 lb (227 kg) or two 1,000 lb (454 kg) conventional bombs.
- Rockets: 2 × internal launchers for 14 2-inch RP rockets, 28 total

Avionics
GEC AI.18 Air Interception radar

== See also ==
External videos
- Preserved Sea Vixen taking off and performing an aerial display at RNAS Yeovilton Air Day 2015
- Compilation of period Sea Vixen carrier operations
- Footage of the 1952 Farnborough air show accident with accompanying eye witness account
- rare flat display practice at RNAS Yeovilton

- De Havilland Aviation
- 1952 Farnborough Airshow crash
- de Havilland Aircraft Museum

Related development

- de Havilland Vampire
- de Havilland Sea Venom

Aircraft of comparable role, configuration, and era

- Avro Canada CF-100 Canuck
- Douglas F3D Skyknight
- McDonnell F3H Demon
- Northrop F-89 Scorpion

Related lists

- List of fighter aircraft
