= 2-inch RP =

1950s rocket weapon developed by the UK Royal Navy

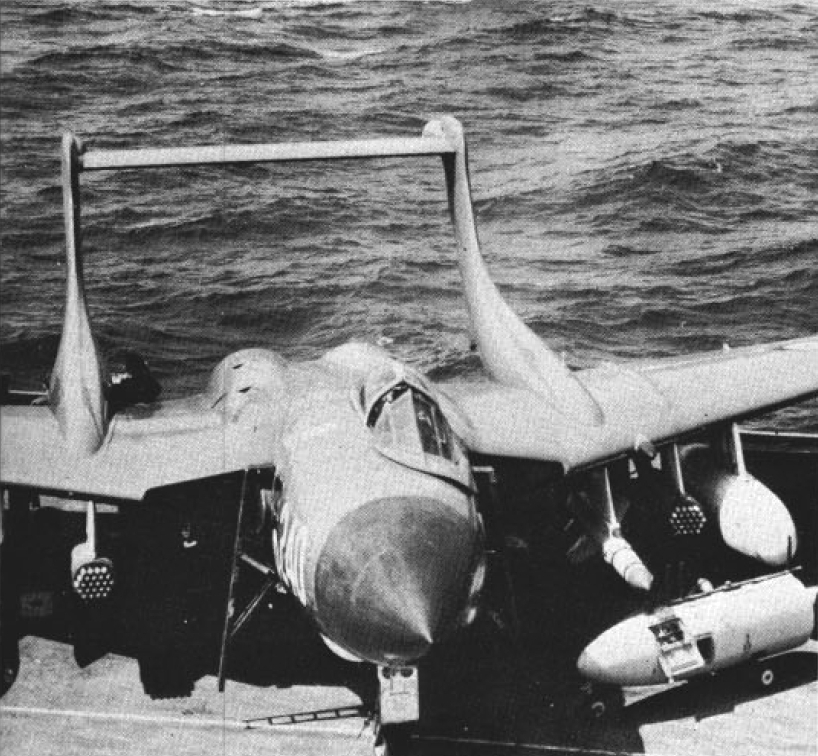
A Sea Vixen with underwing 2-inch rocket pods between drop tanks and Firestreak air-to-air missiles

The 2-inch RP, short for Rocket Projectile, 2-inch, Number 1 Mark 1, was an unguided rocket weapon developed by the Royal Navy in the 1950s. It is generally similar to contemporary rockets like the SNEB and FFAR, although somewhat smaller. It is sometimes known as the RP-2 or RN, but most often referred to simply as the 2-inch. The Microcell company produced one of the most-used launchers, and references to the Microcell rocket are sometimes found.

Originally developed as an air-to-air weapon similar to the wartime German R4M rocket, these types of weapons were quickly rendered obsolete with the introduction of early guided air-to-air missiles. They were then redirected toward air-to-ground use. The 2-inch was mainly used by the Navy's Fleet Air Arm (FAA) and was standard equipment on most of its aircraft during the 1950s and into the 1960s. It saw operational use on the de Havilland Sea Vixen during the Withdrawal from Aden in 1969, although it is unknown whether these were fired in combat. The Royal Air Force (RAF) did not initially use the weapon, preferring their own RP-3, but it was offered on a variety of RAF designs when being sold to foreign customers.

The RAF received the 2-inch when they took over a number for former FAA Blackburn Buccaneers in 1969, although by this time most RAF aircraft carried the SNEB instead. With the opening of the Falklands War in 1982, the RAF found the Navy unwilling to allow the SNEB on their ships due to the concern that the powerful radars might set off their electrical primers. The Buccaneer pods were quickly tested on the RAF's Hawker Siddeley Harrier GR3s that were being sent southward. The first use in combat took place on 31 May against dug-in troops on Mount Kent and then continued through the rest of the conflict.

== Development ==
=== Early British rockets ===
In 1934, British intelligence learned of German rocketry efforts and formed a group to study these systems. Some early experiments in 1935 and 1936 seemed promising and a new department was set up at Woolwich Arsenal to develop solid fuel rocket motors based on cordite. A 2-inch anti-aircraft rocket was developed followed by a larger 3-inch version.

During battles in North Africa in early 1941, the Desert Air Force found its weapons were ineffective against German armoured fighting vehicles and a study group under Henry Tizard formed to consider the issue. This led to small numbers of Hawker Hurricanes being fitted with Vickers S 40 mm cannon and used from May 1942. The S massed 320 pounds (150 kg) and each round 4 pounds (1.8 kg), which seriously affected aircraft performance. That summer, adaptations of rockets for anti-tank use were considered using an explosive warhead for the 2-inch and a solid armour-piercing warhead for the 3-inch. The 2-inch was abandoned as having no benefit over the S gun. Test firings of the 3-inch were carried out in October 1941.

The 3-inch version was put into production as the RP-3 and became a major weapon from spring 1943 onwards. As anti-submarine weapons, the RP-3 could penetrate the hull of a U-boat and prevent it from diving, making it an easy target for larger aircraft carrying bombs and depth charges. When attention returned to the anti-tank role, it was found the solid warhead was not effective and a new 60 lb (27 kg) warhead filled with 12 lb (5.4 kg) of high explosive was developed. Introduced in the fall of 1943, it was widely used for the rest of the war.

=== R4M and post-war derivatives ===
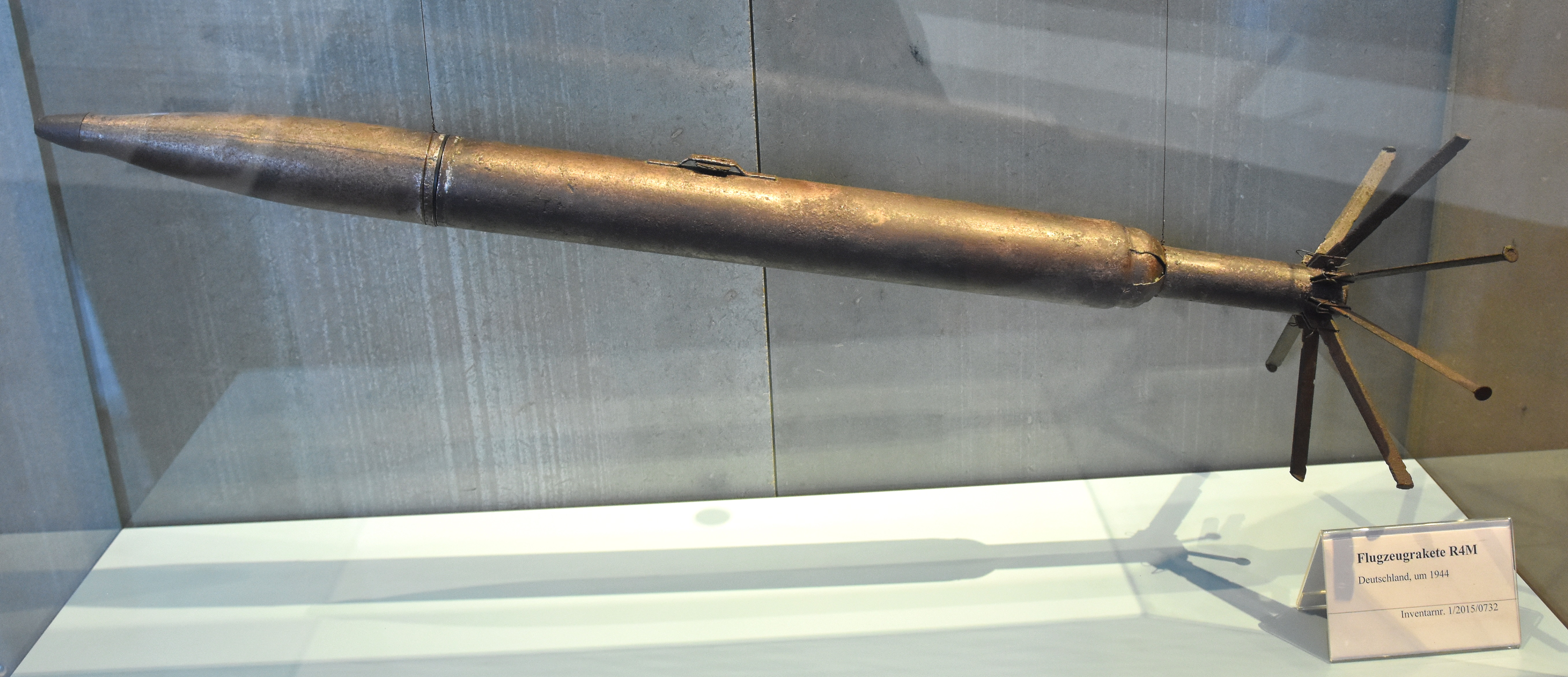
The R4M set the pattern for airborne rockets to this day.

In 1944, the German Luftwaffe began operations with the rocket-powered Messerschmitt Me 163, and found that their existing weapons were inadequate for high-speed aircraft. Tests had demonstrated that five rounds of their newest air-to-air autocannon, the 30 mm MK 108, were needed to destroy a Boeing B-17 Flying Fortress heavy bomber. The low firing rate of this weapon, combined with the very high relative speeds of the aircraft, meant there was only a brief period where the fighter was in range. Getting this number of hits proved very difficult before they flew past their target.

With the Messerschmitt Me 262 about to enter service, in 1944 the Luftwaffe began development of an air-to-air rocket which emerged as the R4M. As this was intended for high-speed aircraft, the fixed fins and large launching rails of weapons like the RP-3 would not be acceptable. The R4M introduced the concept of folding fins, which allowed the rockets to be stored in a compact space in a rack that was mounted flush to the bottom of the wing, or in tubes carried in streamlined pods on hardpoints. Testing began in October 1944 and its first use in combat was in March 1945.

In the post-war era, the R4M, along with many other late-war German weapon projects, was picked up by most of the countries involved in European combat. The US Air Force introducing the Folding-Fin Aerial Rocket (FFAR) and the French the SNEB. Although designed for air-to-air use, both found themselves used almost entirely in the air-to-ground role.

=== Development of 2-inch for RN ===
The Royal Navy's Fleet Air Arm had a significant lack of capability in the immediate post-war era. Jet aircraft had not yet been deployed to carriers, and their aircraft were day-fighter designs with little night fighting capacity like the Hawker Sea Fury. When operating from forward locations, these aircraft faced the possibility of encountering jet powered aircraft which they could only attack head-on. Fast closing speeds meant a far more powerful weapon would be needed to ensure single-pass destruction.

Although this role was slated to be filled by guided air-to-air missiles and development had already begun on the "Red Hawk" project, an R4M-like weapon would fill the immediate need. The large warhead of the RP-3 was not required, so the new weapon was based on the 2-inch motor. This was modified with the addition of a folding fin system similar to the R4M, which screwed onto the end of existing motors. Initially fired from wooden racks like those on the Me 262, and later, a variety of pods and dedicated launcher systems. Development began in 1950, and they were shown publicly for the first time at the Farnborough Air Show in 1958.

In contrast, the RAF saw no pressing need for an air-to-air rocket as they believed another air war was at least ten years off, by which time air-to-air missiles would be available. They did not take up the 2-inch and continued to use their large wartime stocks of RP-3 in the air-to-ground role until the Withdrawal from Aden in 1967. The 2-inch had been considered as a replacement for the RP-3 in the 1960s, but the more powerful SNEB was selected instead.

A new series of glass reinforced plastic ("fibreglass") launchers made by the newly formed Microcell company were available in 14, 24 and 37-rocket capacities. The weapon is sometimes known as "the Microcell rocket" as a result, although Microcell also produced pods for the SNEB rockets. Microcell pods were available for the Hawker Hunter, English Electric Lightning, English Electric Canberra, de Havilland Sea Vixen and Supermarine Scimitar. There were also custom tube launchers designed to fit into weapons bays on particular aircraft. A 24-cell launcher was carried in pairs behind the nose wheel of the Scimitar, and 14-cell launchers in either side of the Sea Vixen's nose wheel. A similar set of two pods carrying 22 rockets each was designed for the Lightning, but only offered to foreign customers. External pods for the 2-inch were not offered for the Lightning, which had SNEB pods instead.

== Service ==
After protracted development, the 2-inch entered service on the Sea Vixen and Scimitar in 1961. The last FAA aircraft known to support the 2-inch was the Blackburn Buccaneer, which entered service in 1962. They were carried in active duty by Buccaneer aircraft covering the withdrawal from Aden, and may have been used at that time. The only well-recorded use of them by the Buccaneer was during the attempt to break up the SS Torrey Canyon in March 1967, when 11 rockets (Note: Some sources say 16.) were fired at the massive oil spill in hopes of setting it alight.

In 1969, the FAA handed off a number of their Buccaneer aircraft to the RAF as they prepared to retire the last of their aircraft carriers able to handle these large aircraft, HMS Eagle. The RAF took these models and formed up No. 12 Squadron RAF as a maritime strike force, taking their existing 2-inch pods with them. The Buccaneer could carry four pods, each with 36 rockets thereby providing each aircraft with up to 144 rockets, making it a potent system for use against smaller craft like a fast patrol boats and surfaced submarines.

In the Falklands War in 1982 RAF Hawker Siddeley Harrier GR3s were operated from RN carriers after conversion training. The RAF had begun replacing their rocket weapons with the BL755 beginning in 1973 but these were still in short supply, and the SNEB was still widely used. The SNEB had not been cleared for carriage on ships, and the Navy was concerned that the ship's powerful radar systems might set off their electrical igniters. The rocket pods from RAF Buccaneers were fitted to the Harriers and after hurried testing, clearance to use them was received on 26 April.

The first recorded use was on 31 May against Argentine troops during the Battle of Mount Kent and they continued to be used throughout the conflict. The Navy did not use the 2-inch during the conflict.

== Description ==
The 2-inch is similar to contemporary folding-fin rockets, although it is somewhat smaller than most. It was 1.2 m (3 ft 11 in) long and 50.8 mm (2.00 in) in diameter, with the rocket motor itself taking up 0.911 m (2 ft 11.9 in) of the length. Only a single warhead was used, a high-explosive fragmentation type with 750 g (26 oz) of explosive fired by a simple contact fuse. The rocket weighed 4.5 kg (9 lb 15 oz) in total.

The only major difference compared to other weapons was the much smaller guidance fins. These were held onto the rocket with small pivots at the extreme rear of the rocket body, and stored by rotating them counterclockwise to point forward in a recess on the rocket body. On launch, wind would pull on the tips of the fins and cause them to rotate 90 degrees clockwise into their extended position.

The rocket flew at an average velocity of 2,234 feet per second (1,523 mph) and had a listed effective slant range of 1 mile (1.6 km). The flight time was about 2.4 seconds and during that time they would drop about 1 degree 17 minutes, roughly half that of the RP-3.
