= De Havilland Aviation =

Former aviation company, United Kingdom

- Type: Current (reincorporated 2017)
- Industry: Aerospace
- Founded: 1988
- Headquarters: Bournemouth, Dorset, England, UK
- Services: Civil and military aircraft

De Havilland Aviation was originally a licensed aircraft company based in Bournemouth, United Kingdom. It maintained and operated many post-War vintages and modern aircraft, owned by both the company and on behalf of private clients. Its most noteworthy restoration project was restoring the de Havilland DH110 Sea Vixen XP924 to flightworthy status; at its time, the most complex aircraft restoration project ever undertaken. Its main base was Bournemouth Airport but it also operated a Worldwide spares and parts service from Swansea in Wales, supplying many of the vintage aircraft owners as well as various air forces.

De Havilland Aviation was a corporate partner of the Royal Aeronautical Society and was licensed by the Civil Aviation Authority (CAA).

Although previously dissolved in 2011, De Havilland Aviation Ltd has now been reincorporated under a new management team.

== History ==
De Havilland Aviation was born out of the former aviation trust, Jet Heritage (founded by display pilot Michael Carlton), although the De Havilland name has its roots much further back to the de Havilland Aircraft Company who built many of the aircraft that De Havilland Aviation eventually maintained. Originally set up by Gwynn Jones, the then owner of the Sea Vixen, it expanded its operation to the restoration and operation of other manufacturers and types of aircraft including Vampires, Meteors, and Hunters.

The Sea Vixen project was started in 1997 and took five years to complete during which time the First Sea Lord of the Royal Navy gave his support to the project. Following the completion of the project, XP924 was registered on the civilian register as G-CVIX and became the only flightworthy Sea Vixen in the World. The company was subsequently awarded a sponsorship deal by Red Bull Marketing to display the Sea Vixen in the Red Bull corporate logo. However, in 2007 the aircraft was restored to its former Navy markings, complete with its original registration of XP924. At the time, it was the only privately owned former military jet in Europe capable of breaking the sound barrier.

Following on from the success of the Sea Vixen project, the company embarked on providing support for many air show events around both the UK and Europe by way of aircraft displays and maintenance support. In August 2006, the company applied to the CAA to hold an air show operator's licence so that the Sea Vixen could be displayed along Bournemouth Seafront prior to the annual display by the Royal Air Force Aerobatic Team, The Red Arrows. As a result of that display and that of the Red Arrows, a charity lunch held at the Bournemouth BIC raised over £25,000 for local charities.

== 2005 Corporate buy out ==
In October 2005, the company was sold to a consortium led by Geoff Beck and Julian Jones, along with the aircraft stock. Paul Kingsbury, the Chief Engineer since the Jet Heritage days, took on the role of Director of Engineering and led the engineering side of the company. The role of Chief Pilot was continued by Brian Grant, a display pilot, until his retirement in December 2007. During his time as Chief Pilot for the company, Brian won the UK Airshow Review (UKAR) Classic Jet Display award for three years running for his public displays of the Sea Vixen. That award had never before been awarded three years consecutively to any display pilot or team.

De Havilland Aviation continued to restore and maintain classic jets, and provide operational support for air shows. It became a major sponsor of the inaugural Bournemouth Air Festival in 2008, having committed aircraft and logistical support to the four-day event. This included providing a De Havilland Venom as a static display at St. Paul's roundabout in Bournemouth to promote the event.

Its most recent project was the restoration to flight of former Red Arrows Folland Gnat XR537, having completed projects on two Jet Provosts during 2007. XR537 was officially re-launched during the Bournemouth Air Festival 2008 and was part of a nostalgic flypast with the Royal Air Force Aerobatic Team, The Red Arrows. That flypast remains the only occasion that a genuine former Red Arrows Gnat has flown in formation with the team's current BAe Hawks.

In May 2008, the company was contracted to take on the restoration of the former Source Aviation Flight, which included de Havilland Vampires and Venoms, and to return as many jets from that historic collection to flight as possible.

== 2011 Corporate dissolution ==
Following the expansion plans of Bournemouth Airport, the company was relocated to a new hangar on the north-east sector of the airport during the summer of 2008. Following a period of no further restorations and a break up of the company, De Havilland Aviation was formally dissolved on 3 May 2011. Operational responsibility for some of the aircraft formerly in the care of the company was transferred to a newly established company - D.S. Aviation Ltd is later known as D.S. Worldwide (Military) Aviation Ltd. Sea Vixen G-CVIX was eventually handed over in trust to the Royal Navy Heritage Flight at RNAS Yeovilton.

== 2017 Reincorporation ==
De Havilland Aviation Ltd was reincorporated in the summer of 2017 to manage the aviation interests of Geoff Beck, one of the original consortium directors of the 2005 takeover.
