= SNEB =

Air-to-ground military rocket system

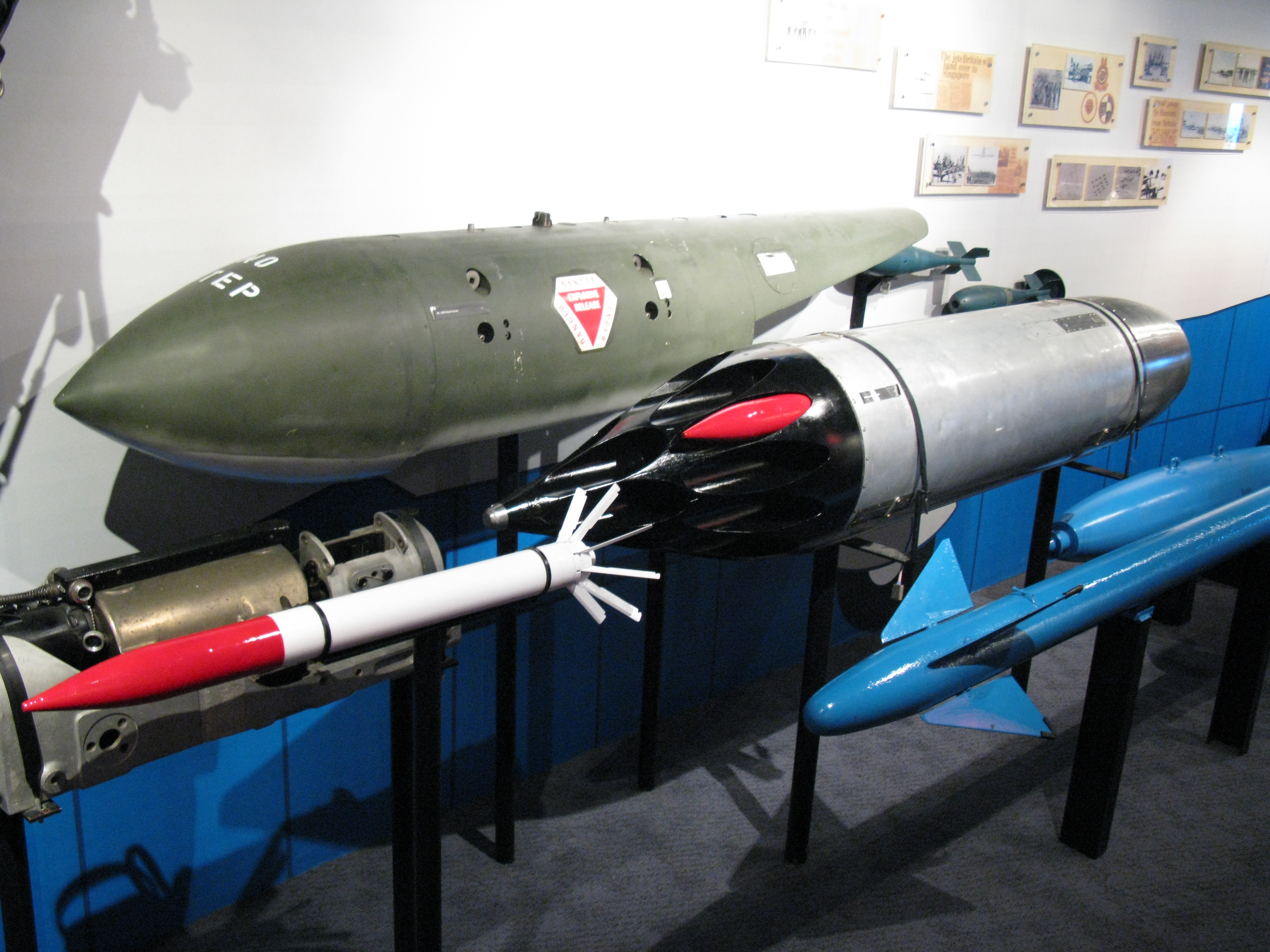
- A Matra Type 155 SNEB rocket launcher pod with two red-tipped 68 mm dummy rockets.
- Type: Rocket
- Place of origin: France

Service history
- Used by: France, United Kingdom, United States, Lebanon

Production history
- Designed: From the early 1950s
- Manufacturer: Thomson-Brandt, Matra
- Produced: 1955

Specifications
- Diameter: 68 mm (2.7 in) (unfired)
- Guidance system: none, or laser
- Launch platform: Attack aircraft, helicopters

The SNEB rocket (Société Nouvelle des Établissements Edgar Brandt French: New Society of Edgar Brandt Establishments) is an unguided air-to-surface 68 mm (2.7 in) rocket projectile manufactured by the French company TDA Armements, designed for launch by attack aircraft and helicopters. It is also known as the SNEB rocket pod, and sometimes as the Matra rocket, due to it commonly being carried in pod-like launchers built by Matra.

Two other rockets were developed in the 37 mm (1.5 in) and 100 mm (3.9 in) caliber. The 37mm caliber was one of the earliest folding fin free flight rockets developed after World War II; it was developed mainly for air-to-air engagements and is no longer in service. The 100mm caliber variant is in service with the French Air Force and a few other air forces. Besides France, several other nations produce the SNEB 68 mm rocket under license. In France today, SNEB has been reorganized into the firm of Thomson-Brandt.

== Warheads ==
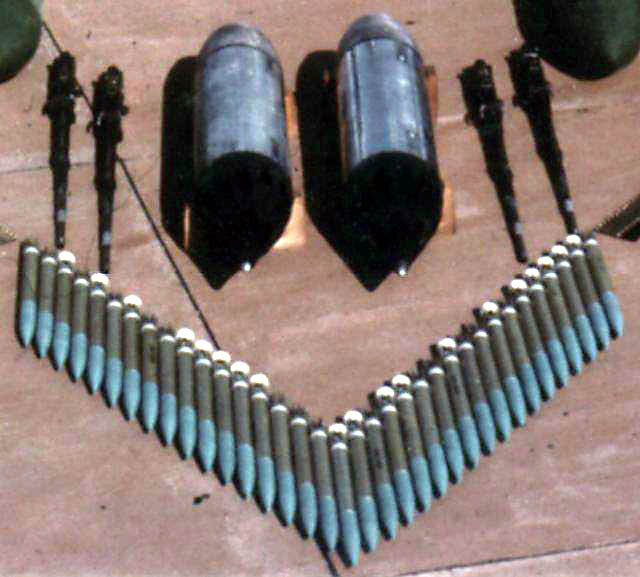
Two Matra Type 155 rocket launchers with 36 SNEB 68mm rockets

The SNEB rockets can be armed with these warheads:

- High explosive (HE)
- High-explosive anti-tank (HEAT) shaped charge
- Multi-purpose fragmentation
- Flechette anti-personnel/materiel
- Smoke
- Illuminating
- Training rocket

=== Laser guidance development ===
The Système de Roquette À Correction de Trajectoire (SYROCOT) is a program where a laser-guided seeker is incorporated into the design. It is compatible with the existing SNEB system. It is comparable to the US Advanced Precision Kill Weapon System project.

== Rocket launchers, pods ==
The French armament company of Matra produced three types of rocket launcher for use with the SNEB 68 mm rockets:

- Matra Type 116M rocket launcher – This is lightly constructed and used as an expendable rocket launcher pod with a frangible nose cone, loaded with 19 SNEB 68mm rockets which are fired in one rippled 0.5 second salvo with a time interval of 33 milliseconds between each rocket firing. The pod automatically jettisons after all rockets are gone.
- Matra Type 155 rocket launcher – Widely produced, this is a reusable device made fully of metal with a fluted nose cone through which the rockets fire. Loaded with 18 SNEB 68mm rockets, it can be preprogrammed on the ground to fire individually or in one ripple salvo as the Type 116M.
- Matra JL-100 drop tank, rocket pack — This unique arrangement combines a 66 US gallons (250 L) drop tank with a rocket launcher containing 19 SNEB 68 mm rockets in front to form an aerodynamically shaped pod which can be mounted on over-wing or under-wing hardpoints. One notable aircraft equipped with this was the English Electric Lightning F.53 of Royal Saudi Air Force.

TDA Armements SAS (a subsidiary of Thales Group) also manufactures pods for the 68mm SNEB rocket. Variants produced are the 12 tube Telson 12 JF for fighter aircraft, the 12 tube Telson 12 and the 22 tube Telson 22 used by the Eurocopter Tiger, the 8 tube Telson 8 designed for light helicopters and the 2 tube Telson 2 suitable for unmanned aerial vehicles and light counter-insurgency aircraft.

The British firm Thomas French & Sons also produced a series of launchers for the SNEB, which were licensed versions of the Matra Type 155. These were later adapted for the Royal Navy's own post-war 2-inch RP rockets which replaced the SNEB due to concerns over the electrical firing system being set off by ship radars.

== Used by ==
=== Helicopters ===
External images
- SNEB 68 mm rockets Helicopter
- 22 round 68mm helicopter pod by Brandt
- Fact Sheet 68mm Multi-Dart Rocket

- Bell UH-1H of the Lebanese Air Force were modified locally to carry bombs and Matra SNEB 68 mm rocket pods taken from unserviceable Hawker Hunters
- Aérospatiale Puma
- Eurocopter AS332
- Eurocopter AS 532
- Eurocopter EC 725
- Eurocopter Tiger

=== Fixed-wing aircraft ===
External images
- SNEB 68 mm rockets Fixed Wing Aircraft
- Harrier GR.3 firing entire salvo of 4 rocket pods
- Harrier GR.7 in flight with 2 SNEB rocket pods
- 1962 Manufacture's ad for various Matra/SNEB rocket pods
- French Navy Super Etendard fitted with Type 155 SNEB rocket pods to outer pylons

- Atlas Cheetah
- Atlas Impala
- BAE Sea Harrier
- BAE Harrier II
- BAE Systems Hawk
- Blackburn Buccaneer
- Canadair Sabre
- Cessna Super Skymaster FTB337G
- Dassault-Breguet Super Étendard
- Dassault/Dornier Alpha Jet
- Dassault Étendard IV
- Dassault Mystère
- Dassault Mystère IV
- Dassault Mirage III
- Dassault Mirage 5
- Dassault Mirage F1
- Dassault Ouragan
- Dassault Rafale (From 2026)
- Dassault Super Mystère
- de Havilland Sea Vixen
- Douglas A-26 Invader
- English Electric Canberra
- English Electric Lightning
- Fiat G.91
- Fouga CM.170 Magister
- HAL HF-24 Marut
- Hawker Hunter
- Hawker Siddeley Harrier
- IAI Kfir
- Malmö Flygindustri MFI-9
- McDonnell Douglas F-4J/K/M
- Morane-Saulnier Vanneau
- Nanchang A-5 - Pakistani A-5C variants only.
- North American F-86 Sabre
- North American T-6 Texan
- North American T-28S Fennec
- SEPECAT Jaguar
- Shenyang F-6 – Pakistan Aeronautical Complex (PAC) modified F-6C variants only
- Sud Aviation Vautour

== See also ==
- Hydra 70, American equivalent
- CRV7, Canadian equivalent
