= Salt Wells Pilot Plant =

Facility established by the Manhattan Project

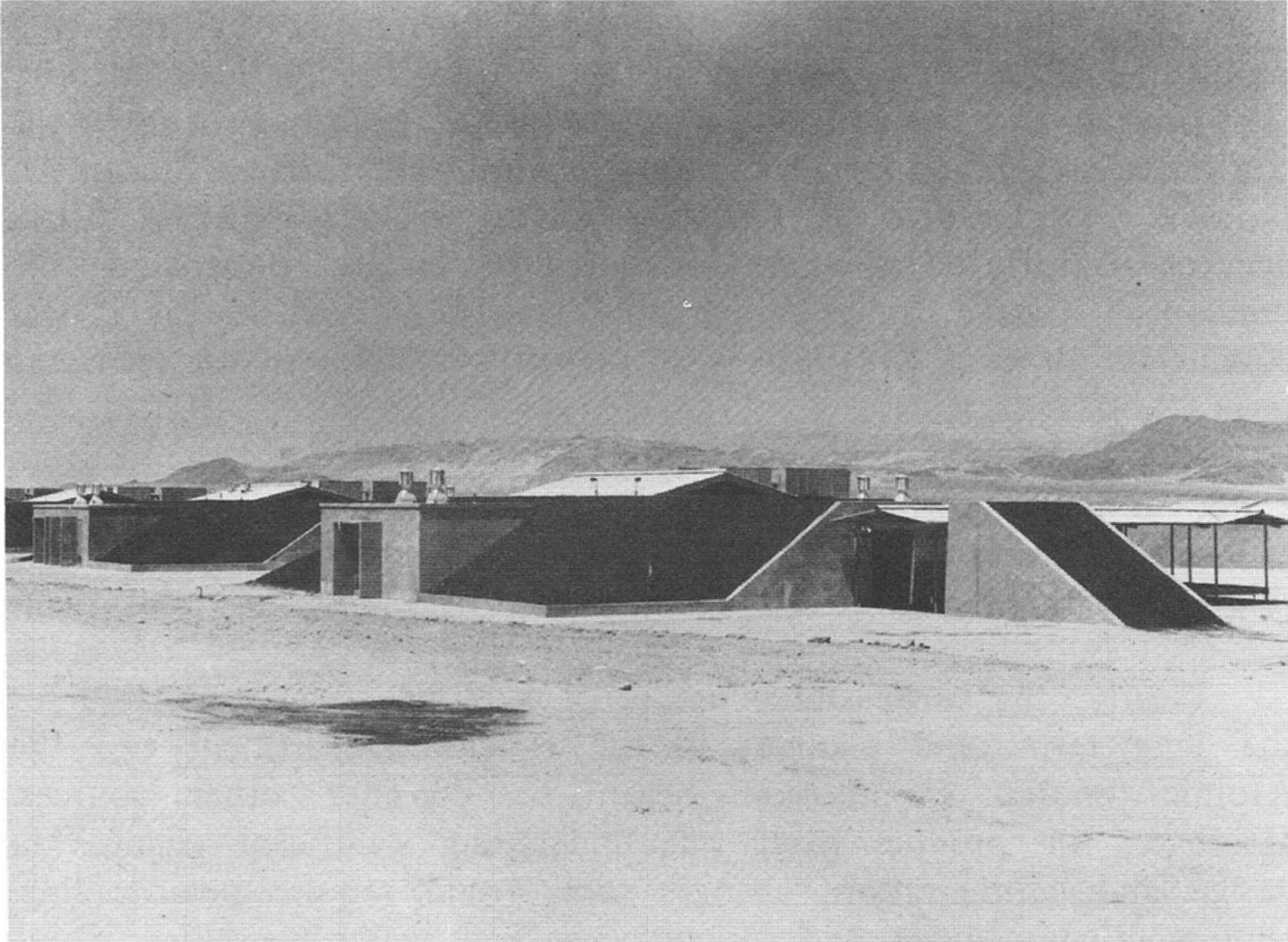
Salt Wells Pilot Plant in August 1946. These are the machining buildings. The heavy walls and earth-filled berms protect adjacent structures from explosions.

The Salt Wells Pilot Plant was a facility established by the Manhattan Project at the Naval Ordnance Test Station (NOTS) at Inyokern, California, where non-nuclear explosive components of nuclear weapons were manufactured. The first explosives were melted, mixed and poured on 25 July 1945. Between 1945 and 1954, it manufactured explosive components of the Fat Man, Mark 4, Mark 5 and Mark 12 nuclear bombs. The Salt Wells Pilot Plant also helped design, equip, and train workers for the Burlington AEC Plant in Iowa and the Pantex Plant in Texas. The Salt Wells Pilot Plant closed on 30 June 1954.

== Background ==
In the early 1930s, an emergency landing field was built by the Works Progress Administration in the Mojave Desert near the small town of Inyokern, California. Opened in 1935, it was acquired by the United States Army Air Forces (USAAF) in 1942 after the United States became involved in World War II, and became part of the Muroc Bombing and Gunnery Range. In 1943, the Office of Scientific Research and Development (OSRD) contracted with the California Institute of Technology (Caltech) for the testing and evaluation of rockets for the Navy.

A suitable test area was required for this convenient to Pasadena, California, so the area was transferred from the Army to the Navy in October 1943, and commissioned as the Naval Ordnance Test Station (NOTS), Inyokern, on 8 November 1943, under the command of Captain Sherman E. Burroughs, Jr. Workshops, laboratories and facilities were constructed for over 600 men. During 1944, NOTS worked on the development and testing of the 3.5-inch, 5-inch, HVAR and 11.75-inch (Tiny Tim) rockets.

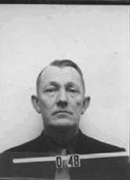
Charles C. Lauritsen, the head of the rocket team at Caltech

By late 1944, rocket development and testing work began to taper off, and production models started to reach the Navy and USAAF in quantity. The director of the OSRD, Vannevar Bush, saw an opportunity to use some of the expertise at Caltech on another secret wartime project he was involved with, the Manhattan Project. Bush arranged for Charles C. Lauritsen, the head of the rocket team at Caltech, to visit the Los Alamos Laboratory, and meet with the project director, Major General Leslie R. Groves, Jr., the laboratory director, Robert Oppenheimer, and senior scientists.

Oppenheimer and Lauritsen knew each other well, as Oppenheimer had worked at Caltech before the war. In addition to its scientists, Caltech also possessed an experienced procurement team, headed by Trevor Gardner. This group worked closely with its counterpart at Los Alamos, which was headed by Lieutenant Colonel Robert W. Lockridge. All the work done at NOTS on behalf of the Manhattan Project came under the codename Project Camel. The name is said to have come from a remark by a Los Alamos scientist that once a camel (meaning Caltech) gets its nose under a tent flap it is hard to dislodge.

The Los Alamos Laboratory was engaged in the development of an implosion-type nuclear weapon, codenamed Fat Man. This used explosive lenses to focus an explosion onto a spherical shape using a combination of both slow and fast high explosives. The design of lenses that detonated with the proper shape and velocity turned out to be slow, difficult and frustrating. Various explosives were tested before settling on composition B as the fast explosive and baratol as the slow explosive. The final design resembled a soccer ball, with 20 hexagonal and 12 pentagonal lenses, each weighing about 80 pounds (36 kg).

The explosive lenses required by the Fat Man had to be fabricated. A small explosive plant was established at Los Alamos known as Site S, as it was a former sawmill. Groves was appalled at the work practices and safety at Site S, and considered it only a matter of time before it blew up. Graves expressed his concerns about Site S to Captain William S. (Deak) Parsons, a Navy officer who was in charge of O (for ordnance) Division at Los Alamos. Parsons recommended establishing another explosives plant. While Site S had the capacity to produce enough explosive lenses for one or two bombs per month, more might be required.

Parsons suggested that NOTS might be a suitable location. It was remote and easy to secure, and Caltech had experience with pilot plants, such as the ones at Eaton Canyon and China Lake, where rocket propellants were manufactured. Groves had some misgivings about this, because he thought that the Navy might err too far on the side of workplace safety when time was of the utmost importance.

== Construction ==
On 1 January 1945, Groves and Parsons flew to Pasadena, California, where they met with Lauritsen and Bruce Sage, who had built the China Lake Pilot Plant where the rockets were made, and it was agreed that Caltech would build and operate the pilot plant for the manufacture of the non-nuclear explosives used in the atomic bomb. Groves wanted the plant working within 100 days to meet the expected demand in the months to come.

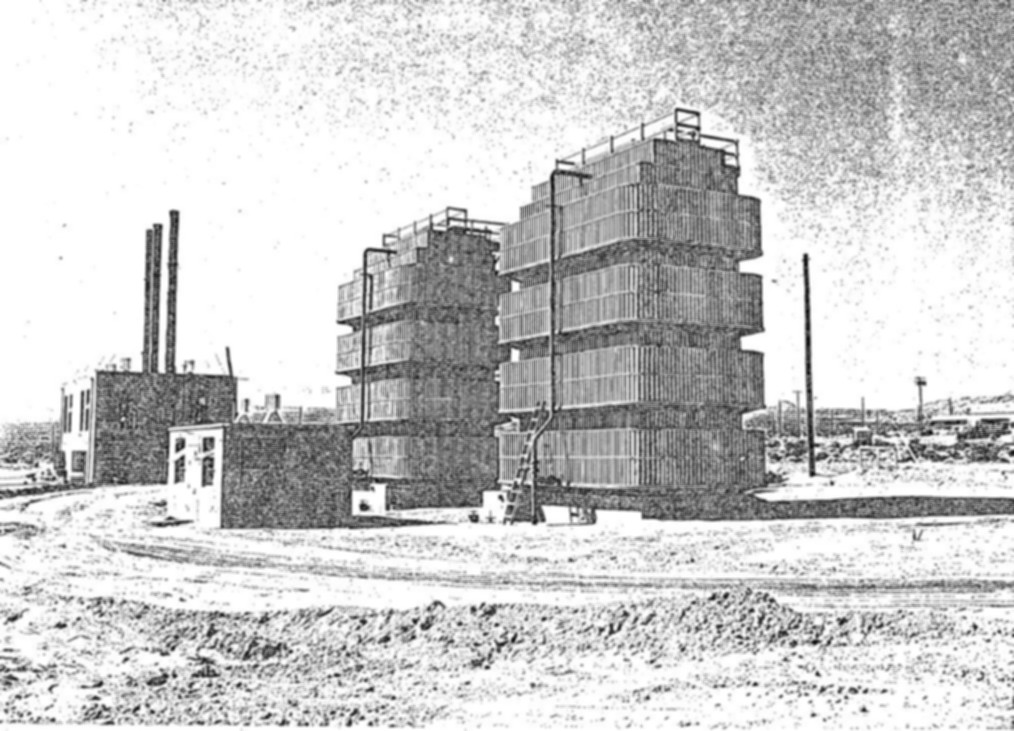
The boiler plant and cooling towers. The Salt Wells Pilot Plant required large volumes of water at various temperatures.

A site was chosen in the Salt Wells Valley. The cost of the plant and its equipment were estimated at $13 million. Sage was in overall charge, with particular responsibility for planning, administration and the approval of special equipment. William Lacey was in charge of safety; Paul A. Longwell, a chemical engineer, of technical aspects; and Palmer Sabin was chief architect. The firm of Holmes and Narver were chosen as architect-engineers, and Haddock Engineers as the construction contractor. Complicating the construction program was that Los Alamos had not finalized what processes would be used. Of particular concern was whether they would use casting or hot pressing with the explosives. For a time, work proceeded so as to accommodate either process, but ultimately a decision was required. Lauritsen pushed for a decision, and in April it was decided to use the melting and casting method.

Work commenced on 80 buildings, 52 of them permanent. To meet the deadline, construction was carried out around the clock. Equipping the plants involved its own challenges. As soon as specifications were drawn up for certain items, the design group would place orders for them. Some facilities had to be fabricated for the purpose. Some items were hard to locate, while others were in short supply in the wartime economy. The Manhattan Project's overriding priority overcame this problem. In some cases, the Army had representatives at the factories where items were made who designated them for use by the Manhattan Project and took possession of them as they came off the assembly line. The molds, which needed to be surrounded by cooling water coils, proved difficult to fabricate, and went through several design changes. The melting kettles required stainless steel mixing blades, cooling jackets and tilting supports. Since each held enough high explosive to level a building, they were operated remotely, behind thick concrete walls.

Groves felt that his fears about excessive safety were realized; reinforced concrete structures, barricades, blast proof doors, deluge systems and electrical shielding all drove up costs. In the end, the Salt wells Pilot Plant was completed and equipped for $16,500,000. The first explosives were melted, mixed and poured on 25 July 1945, missing the 100-day deadline by 15 days.

== Operations ==
The end of the war in August 1945 did not immediately affect operations at the Salt Wells Pilot Plant. Indeed, the process chosen for manufacturing the explosives, that of melting and casting, more or less mandated that operations continue, as it was undesirable to allow a full kettle of high explosive to freeze solid. There were administrative changes, however. On 6 August 1945, Sage proposed that Salt Wells and China Lake Pilot Plants be placed under a single administration. Sage was the only candidate for the administrator position, and this change was implemented with the concurrence of both the Manhattan Project and the Bureau of Ordnance. Another major change was that all civilian staff were transferred from Caltech to the United States federal civil service in October 1945. All employees of the Salt Wells Pilot Plant, whether military or civilian, had to hold Q clearances.

Production at Site S ceased in late 1945 due to the cold weather. By the time it became warmer, the Los Alamos Laboratory had lost so many staff that routine manufacture of explosive lenses would have unacceptably hindered casting of explosives for experimental purposes. All work was then done at Salt Wells. The last construction work was completed in January 1946, and all equipment was installed and working by May 1946, by which time the plant had been in operation for several months. Work was initially dogged by an unacceptably large number of defects in the form of cracks or imperfections in the explosive blocks. The core of the problem was that the techniques used at Los Alamos did not scale to a production site, so different methods were required. Special instrumentation was devised by Caltech's Ira Bowen to assess the quality of the explosive blocks.

In 1945, 120 prefabricated housing units had been hurriedly erected to provide accommodation for the work force. Rent was $15 for a furnished one-bedroom unit, $19 for a two-bedroom unit and $23 for a three-bedroom unit. Despite their temporary nature, these units were retained, and remained occupied until 1961. The influx of new employees called for more accommodation, and the Atomic Energy Commission (AEC), which took over from the Manhattan Project on 1 January 1947, spent $3.252 million on 380 sets of family quarters, streets, electricity, sewers, mains water, and a small school, which was named after Groves, that opened in 1948.

Improved techniques and facilities allowed the plant, which operated on a 48-hour week, with the occasional 51- and 54-hour week, to triple its output in 1947. By 1949, the pilot plant employed over 700 people. The lenses were initially shipped by rail, but this was inconvenient because their high security classification required armed guards. This was therefore replaced by an air transport route, with the lenses being flown in C-54 aircraft based at Fairfield-Suisun Army Air Base. On two occasions, C-54s loaded with explosives were struck by lightning, but no damage to the plane, the crew or the explosives resulted.

As production increased, the advantages of additional plants became obvious. Brigadier General James McCormack, the AEC Director of Military Application, had his staff investigate World War II ordnance installations, looking for ones that could be converted to use as an additional plants. One was selected at Burlington, Iowa, which became the Burlington AEC Plant. The Salt Wells Pilot Plant helped design, equip, and train workers for the new plant, which became operational in 1949. Negotiations began for land, and plans and designs were made, for a new, larger still, plant at Chillicothe, Ohio, but it was decided not to proceed with building it. Another facility was established at the Pantex Plant near Amarillo, Texas, which became operational in 1953. Once again, the staff at the Salt Wells Pilot Plant helped establish the new plant.

While the introduction of the Mark 4 nuclear bomb to replace the Fat Man (the Mark 3) in 1949 caused few problems, that of the Mark 5 nuclear bomb in 1951 required extensive re-tooling. The Los Alamos Scientific Laboratory and Salt Wells Pilot Plant staffs agreed to adopt direct machining of the explosive components. While this was known to generate additional heat, tests at both sites had been conducted without an explosive accident. Further re-tooling was required for the Mark 12 nuclear bomb explosives, which the Salt Wells Pilot Plant began manufacturing in 1953. It also began tooling up for the Mark 13 nuclear bomb.

In January 1954, the AEC informed the Salt Well Pilot Plant staff that the plant would be closed. The Salt Wells Pilot Plant had a higher unit cost than Burlington or Pantex, largely because its isolation required more expenditure on overhead and community costs. About a quarter of the 100 scientists and engineers accepted other jobs at NOTS. Others went to Picatinny Arsenal and the Lawrence Livermore National Laboratory. The plant closed on 30 June 1954.

Estimated final cost of the Salt Wells Pilot Plant
Item	cost
Original construction	$15,000,000
Original plant equipment	$1,500,000
Additions, including equipment	$8,500,000
Operations, including salaries, raw materials and overhead	$40,000,000
Community facilities, including housing, schools, air strips and utilities	$5,000,000
Total expenditures 1945–1954	$70,000,000
