= FFAR =

FFAR may refer to:

- 3.5-Inch Forward Firing Aircraft Rocket
- 5-Inch Forward Firing Aircraft Rocket
- Mk 4/Mk 40 Folding-Fin Aerial Rocket
- Free fatty acid receptor
