= Project Camel =

Caltech work supporting the WW II Manhattan Project

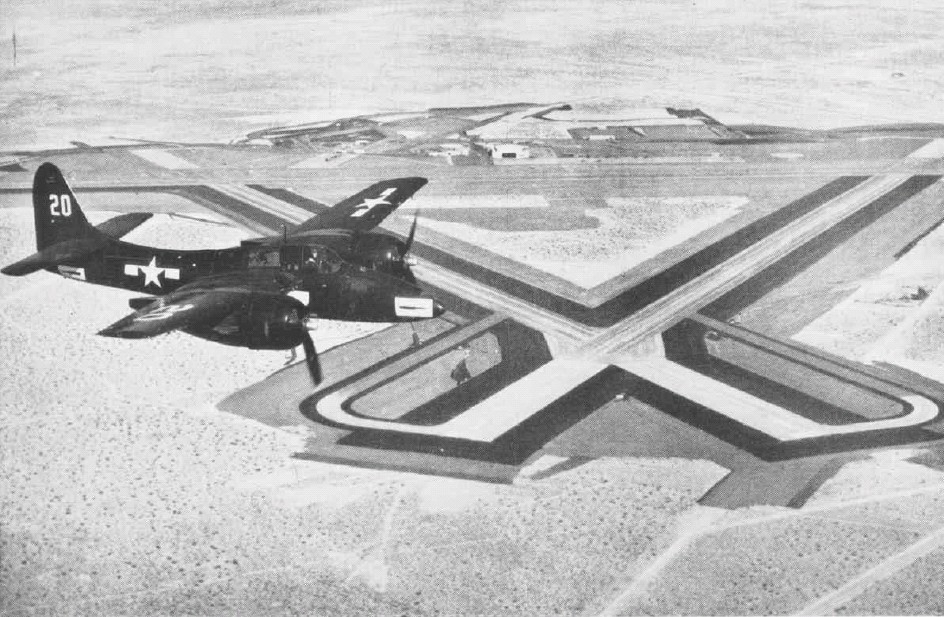
Aerial view of Naval Air Station China Lake. A Grumman F7F Tigercat flies over Armitage Field.

Project Camel encompassed the work performed by the California Institute of Technology (Caltech) in support of the Manhattan Project during World War II. These activities included the development of detonators and other equipment, testing of bomb shapes dropped from Boeing B-29 Superfortress bombers, and the Salt Wells Pilot Plant, where explosive components of nuclear weapons were manufactured.

== Background ==
In the early 1930s, an emergency landing field was built by the Works Progress Administration in the Mojave Desert near the small town of Inyokern, California. Opened in 1935, it was acquired by the United States Army Air Forces (USAAF) in 1942, and became part of the Muroc Bombing and Gunnery Range. In 1943, the Office of Scientific Research and Development (OSRD) contracted with the California Institute of Technology (Caltech) for the testing and evaluation of rockets for the Navy. A suitable test area was required for this near Pasadena, California, so the area was transferred from the Army to the Navy in October 1943, and commissioned as the Naval Ordnance Test Station (NOTS) in December 1943. Workshops, laboratories and facilities were constructed for over 600 men. During 1944, NOTS worked on the development and testing of the 3.5-inch, 5-inch, HVAR and 11.75-inch (Tiny Tim) rockets.

By late 1944, rocket development and testing work began to taper off, and production models started to reach the Navy and USAAF in quantity. The director of the OSRD, Vannevar Bush saw an opportunity to use some of the expertise at Caltech on another secret wartime project he was involved with, the Manhattan Project. Bush arranged for Charles C. Lauritsen, the head of the rocket team at Caltech, to visit the Los Alamos Laboratory, and meet with the project director, Major General Leslie R. Groves, Jr., the laboratory director, Robert Oppenheimer, and senior scientists at the Los Alamos laboratory. Oppenheimer and Lauritsen knew each other well, as Oppenheimer had worked at Caltech before the war. In addition to its scientists, Caltech also possessed an experienced procurement team, headed by Trevor Gardner. This group worked closely with its counterpart at Los Alamos, which was headed by Lieutenant Colonel Robert W. Lockridge.

== Codename ==
All the work done at NOTS on behalf of the Manhattan Project came under the codename Project "Camel". The name is said to have come from a remark by a Los Alamos scientist that once a camel (meaning Caltech) gets its nose under a tent flap it is hard to dislodge.

== Manhattan Project ==
=== Drop testing ===
The Manhattan Project conducted an extensive series of drop tests to evaluate various bomb shapes. These were initially conducted with scale models of the bomb dropped from a Grumman TBF Avenger at the US Navy test range at Dahlgren, Virginia starting in August 1943. A new airfield was constructed at NOTS, using Manhattan Project funding, with three runways, 10,000 feet (3,000 m), 7,700 feet (2,300 m) and 9,000 feet (2,700 m) long, and 200 feet (61 m) wide to accommodate the Boeing B-29 Superfortress. Fuel storage was provided with a capacity of 200,000 US gallons (760,000 L) of gasoline and 20,000 US gallons (76,000 L) of oil. It was opened on 1 June 1945, and named Armitage Field after Navy Lieutenant John Armitage, who was killed while testing a Tiny Tim rocket at NOTS in August 1944.

Three B-29s were based at Armitage for drop testing. Caltech's Gerald Kron developed instrumentation to evaluate the test drops, which were made by aircraft based at NOTS, Muroc and Wendover Army Air Field. Getting the Fat Man to fall properly was quite difficult. One officer described it as:

...a crazy bomb. It was built about like a streamlined brick, and to get [it] to fly reasonably well ballistically was quite a chore.

The resolution of the problem involved extensive testing with various fin configurations. Commander Chick Hayward initially thought that test bombs dropped at NOTS would be easier to recover than those dropped on the sands at Wendover, but they proved to have considerable ability to penetrate the desert floor, and required no less digging out.

The commander of Project Alberta, Captain Deak Parsons, had four bomb assembly kits produced. These kits were fully contained facilities, which included a number of Quonset huts with air conditioning. Two were shipped to the Pacific island of Tinian, where the atomic bombs were assembled. One was kept as a spare at Wendover, and one was erected at Inyokern, where it was used to assemble the explosive but non-nuclear pumpkin bombs for testing.

=== Detonators ===
The design of the Fat Man required that a number of explosive lenses had to be detonated simultaneously. After learning from Luis Alvarez that the Los Alamos Laboratory had encountered problems with the supply of the exploding bridgewire detonators required for this, Lauritsen found manufacturers in the Los Angeles area that could produce them. Alvarez ordered the detonators by the thousand. They were used in the bomb, but most were expended in various diagnostic tests required to verify that the detonators and the lenses worked perfectly.

Responsibility for the development and testing of the critical detonators was shared between Lauritsen's group at Caltech and Robert Henderson's group at Los Alamos. By mid-1945, the object was to produce 1,000 detonators each week. Meeting this target proved challenging. Reliability was the key problem, with initial batches containing unacceptably high numbers of failures. In May 1945, a box of detonators manufactured by Raytheon fell from a truck and tumbled down a mountain side, but were found to still be in working order.

=== Salt Wells Pilot plant ===
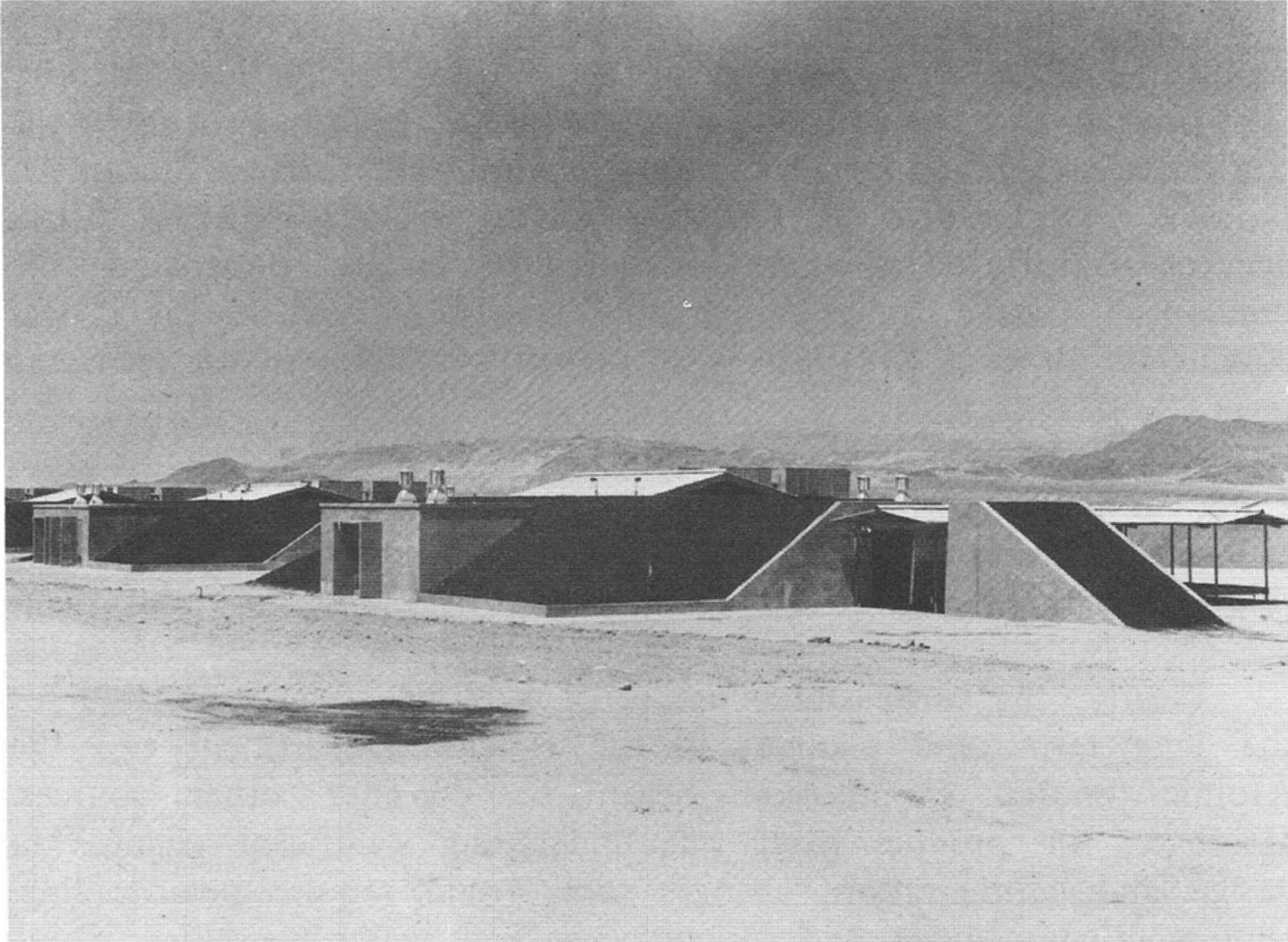
Salt Wells Pilot Plant in August 1946

The explosive lenses required by the Fat Man had to be fabricated. A small explosive plant was established at Los Alamos known as Site S, as it was a former sawmill. Groves was appalled at the work practices and safety at Site S, and considered it only a matter of time before it blew up. On Parsons' recommendation, Groves decided to establish a pilot plant at NOTS, because Caltech had experience in building and operating pilot ordnance plants. He had some misgivings about this, because he thought that the Navy might err too far on the side of workplace safety.

Groves and Parsons met with Lauritsen and Bruce Sage, who had built the China Lake Pilot Plant where the rockets were made, and it was agreed that Caltech would build and operate the plant. A site was chosen in the Salt Wells Valley and work commenced on 80 buildings, 52 of them permanent, at a cost of $13 million. Groves wanted the plant working within 100 days. While Site S had sufficient capacity to make explosive components for one or two bombs, it was unlikely that it could meet the expected demand in the months to come. Complicating the construction program was that Los Alamos had not finalized what processes would be used.

Equipping the Salt Wells Pilot Plant involved its own challenges. Some facilities had to be fabricated for the purpose. Some items were hard to locate, while others were in short supply in the wartime economy. The Manhattan Project's overriding priority overcame this problem. In some cases, the Army had representatives at the factories where items were made who designated them for use by Project Camel. Groves felt that his fears about excessive safety were realized: reinforced concrete, blast proof doors and electrical shielding drove up costs. In the end, after 115 days, the first explosives were melted, mixed and poured on 25 July 1945.

== After the war ==
After the atomic bombing of Hiroshima and Nagasaki, the Under Secretary of War, Robert P. Patterson, sent a telegram to "all the men and women employed on the Camel Project":

Today the whole world knows the secret which you have helped us keep for many months. I am pleased to be able to add that the warlords of Japan now know its effects better even than we ourselves. The atomic bomb which you have helped to develop with high devotion to patriotic duty is the most devastating military weapon that any country has ever been able to turn against its enemy. No one of you has worked on the entire project or known the whole story. Each of you has done his own job and kept his own secret, and so today I speak for a grateful nation when I say congratulations and thank you all. I hope you will continue to keep the secrets you have kept so well. The need for security and for continued effort is fully as great now as it ever was. We are proud of every one of you.

Production at Site S ceased in late 1945 due to the cold weather. All work was then done at Salt Wells. The plant was completed in January 1946, and all equipment was installed and working by May 1946. Work was initially dogged by an unacceptably large number of defects in the form of cracks or imperfections in the explosive blocks. The core of the problem was that the techniques used at Los Alamos did not scale to a production site, so different methods were required. Special instrumentation was devised by Caltech's Ira Bowen to assess the quality of the explosive blocks.

The temporary nature of the accommodation was no longer acceptable after the war, and the Atomic Energy Commission (AEC), which took over from the Manhattan Project on 1 January 1947, spent $3.252 million on 380 sets of family quarters, streets, electricity, sewers, mains water, and a small school, which was named after Groves, and opened in 1948. Improved techniques and facilities allowed the plant to triple its output in 1947. By 1949, the pilot plant employed over 700 people. The pilot plant helped design, equip and train workers for the new Burlington AEC Plant, which took over responsibility for manufacturing the explosive lenses. The Salt Wells Pilot Plant was closed in 1954.
