= Gerald Kron =

American astronomer (1913–2012)

- Born: April 6, 1913; Milwaukee, Wisconsin
- Died: April 9, 2012 (aged 99); Sedona, Arizona
- Education: University of Wisconsin-Madison; University of California
- Known for: photometry discovery of starspots
- Scientific career
- Fields: astronomy
- Workplaces: MIT Radiation Laboratory; Naval Ordnance Test Station; Lick Observatory; United States Naval Observatory; Australian National University
- Doctoral advisor: Joel Stebbins

Gerald Kron (April 6, 1913 – April 9, 2012) was an American astronomer who was one of the pioneers of high-precision photometry with photoelectric instrumentation. He discovered the first starspot and made the first photometric observation of a stellar flare.

A graduate of the University of Wisconsin-Madison, where he earned a Master of Science degree in mechanical engineering in 1934, Kron became interested in astronomy, which he studied under Joel Stebbins. Stebbins arranged for Kron to enter the University of California at Berkeley, where he received his doctorate in astronomy in 1938.

During World War II, Kron served with the Radiation Laboratory at the Massachusetts Institute of Technology, and participated in the development of microwave radar. He later became the head of the Special Devices Group at the Naval Ordnance Test Station (NOTS) at Inyokern, California, where he conducted studies on solid fuel rockets, and developed radio transponders for the Manhattan Project's Project Camel.

After the war Kron returned to the Lick Observatory, where he was one of the designers of the C. Donald Shane telescope. Using photometric techniques that he had pioneered before the war, he studied the stars, especially eclipsing binaries. In 1965, Kron became director of the United States Naval Observatory in Flagstaff, Arizona, and he was a regular visitor to the Australian National University's Mount Stromlo Observatory.

== Early life ==
Gerald Edward Kron was born in Milwaukee on 6 April 1913, the son of Edmund Kron, a mechanic, and his wife Letty Dieterick Kron. He attended Lincoln High School in Milwaukee, and then University of Wisconsin-Madison, where he earned a Master of Science degree in mechanical engineering in 1934. While there took advantage of the access to machine shops as part of his training to design and build a 6-inch telescope. After graduation, he received a scholarship to study astronomy for two years under Joel Stebbins. He published his first paper in 1935, a study of the photometric elements of Boss 5070, an eclipsing binary.

In 1935, Kron travelled to California with Stebbins and Albert Whitford, where Kron and Whitford assisted Stebbins at the Mount Wilson Observatory. After returning to Madison, he worked with Whitford on the design of a 200-inch telescope. Stebbins arranged for Kron to enter the University of California at Berkeley, where he received his doctorate in astronomy in 1938, with a thesis on the photometric elements of eclipsing binaries. He then worked in the Lick Observatory as a research assistant.

== World War II ==
In May 1940 Kron joined the Radiation Laboratory at the Massachusetts Institute of Technology, and participated in the development of microwave radar. He would later use devices and equipment that he became familiar with at the Radiation Laboratory such as the RCA IP21 photomultiplier and Direct-coupled amplifiers in looking at the stars. Later in World War II he became head of the Special Devices Group at the Naval Ordnance Test Station (NOTS) at Inyokern, California, where he conducted studies on solid fuel rockets.

He also participated in the Manhattan Project's Project Camel, developing instrumentation to evaluate the test drops of nuclear bomb shapes. Radio transponders with timing pulses attached to the bombs allowed their position to be tracked the release of the bomb until the time it was all destroyed when the bomb detonated in the air or hit the ground. This gave the drop time to within a few hundredths of a second. In the course of his duties he visited Kingman and Wendover Army Air Fields. When the war ended, he "liberated" some equipment from NOTS before it could be destroyed.

== Later life ==
Eclipsing binary. Algol B orbits Algol A.

After the war Kron returned to the Lick Observatory, where he was one of the designers and creators of the C. Donald Shane telescope. During the war, Kron met Katherine Carson Gordon, a Vassar College graduate and a Radcliff College student, at a picnic at Oak Ridge, Tennessee. After the war, she became an assistant at Lick Observatory. He married her on 22 April 1946. She continued publishing papers under her maiden name.

The two worked together, looking at eclipsing binaries. At one point they found an irregularity, which they attributed to an area of colder temperature, a starspot. His observation and explanation were correct, but he was ahead of his time. It would be many years before the existence of starspots was accepted, and they became a popular research topic. They also made the first photometric observation of a stellar flare.

In 1965, Kron became director of the United States Naval Observatory in Flagstaff, Arizona. He regularly visited Canberra in Australia, where the Mount Stromlo Observatory allowed him to study M-type dwarf stars in the southern sky. He was senior research fellow at the Australian National University in Canberra from 1974 to 1976. He retired in 1985 to live in Honolulu, but moved to Sedona, Arizona, in 1995.

Kron served for a time as President of the Astronomical Society of the Pacific, and the International Astronomical Union's Commission on Instrumentation. He was elected a Fellow of the Royal Astronomical Society.

Kron published over 130 scientific papers, many of them described the method accurately measure the light of stars and globular clusters. He pioneered the use of photomultiplier tubes to measure the infrared radiation of cold stars. His measurements of globular clusters in the Large Magellanic Cloud revised earlier views on distances outside the Milky Way Galaxy.

He died on 12 April 2012. His wife Katherine and son Donald predeceased him. He was survived by his brother Robert and his remaining four children, Richard, Jenny, Virginia and Charles.
