= USS Coral Sea (CV-43) =

Midway-class aircraft carrier of the US Navy

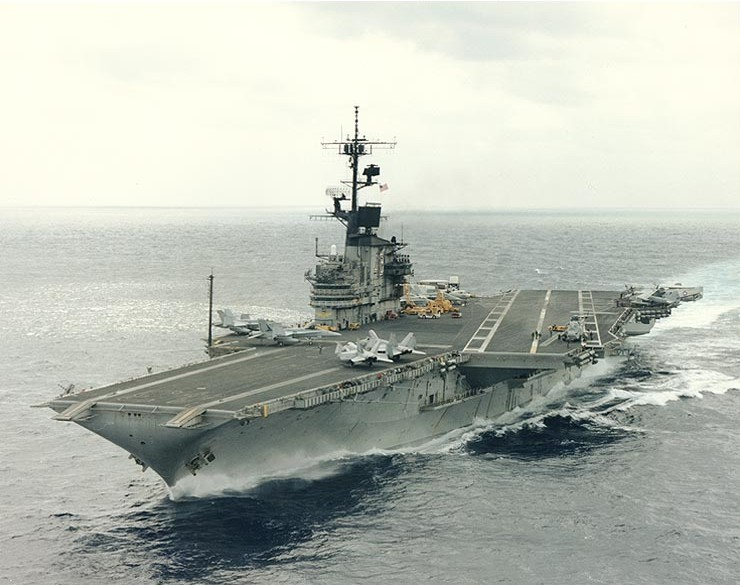
- USS Coral Sea underway on 1 March 1989

History

United States
- Name: Coral Sea
- Namesake: Battle of the Coral Sea
- Ordered: 14 June 1943
- Builder: Newport News Shipbuilding
- Laid down: 10 July 1944
- Launched: 2 April 1946
- Commissioned: 1 October 1947
- Decommissioned: 24 May 1957
- Recommissioned: 25 January 1960
- Decommissioned: 26 April 1990
- Reclassified: CVB-43, 15 July 1943; CVA-43, 1 October 1952; CV-43, 30 June 1975
- Stricken: 28 April 1990
- Motto: Older and Bolder
- Nickname(s): Ageless Warrior; The Natural; San Francisco's own; Best in the west; Coral Maru; The Big Sea or The Big 'C; The Operational Queen of the Seventh Fleet; Mustang (call sign on Yankee Station)
- Fate: Scrapped, 8 September 2000
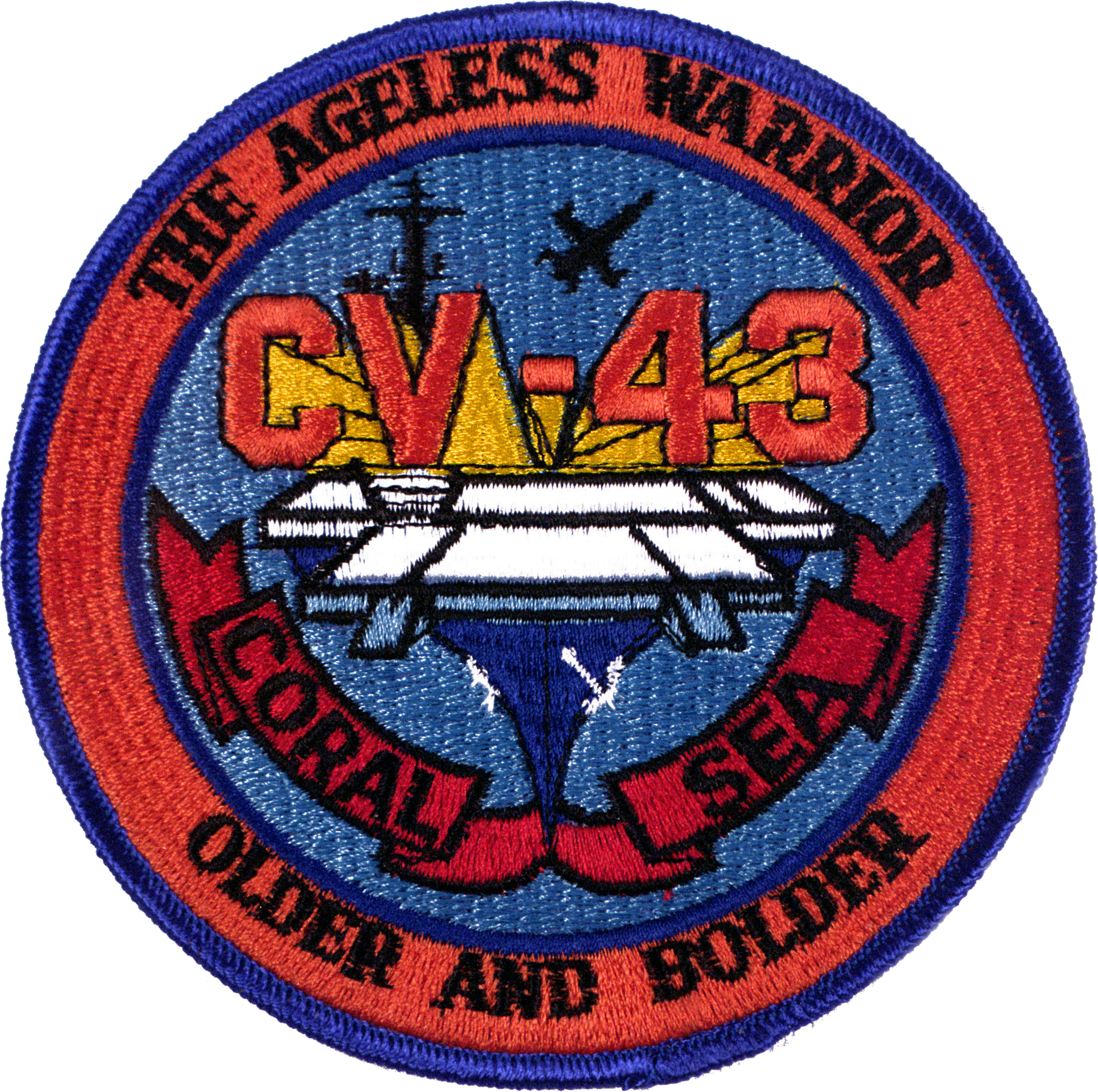
- Badge

General characteristics
- Class & type: Midway-class aircraft carrier
- Displacement: 45,000 long tons (45,722 t) (standard); 60,000 long tons (60,963 t) (full load)
- Length: 899 ft 9 in (274.24 m) wl; 967 ft 8 in (294.94 m) oa
- Beam: 113 ft (34 m) waterline, 136 feet (41 m) flight deck
- Draft: 35 ft (11 m)
- Installed power: 12 Babcock and Wilcox boilers; 212,000 shp (158,000 kW)
- Propulsion: 4 Westinghouse Geared steam turbine sets; 4 shafts
- Speed: 33 knots (61 km/h; 38 mph)
- Range: 15,000 nmi (28,000 km; 17,000 mi) at 15 kn (28 km/h; 17 mph)
- Complement: 4,104 officers and men
- Sensors & processing systems: As built: 1 × SC-2 surveillance radar; 2 × SG surface search radars (on top Mark-37 GFCS); 1 × SK-2 air search radars; 2 × Mk-37 GFCS
- Electronic warfare & decoys: As built: 1 × TDY-2 ECM (anti-radar)
- Armament: As built: (1949); 14 × 5"/54 caliber Mark 16 guns, (14 × 1) * 40 × 3"/50 caliber guns (20 × 2) * 28 × Oerlikon 20 mm cannons (14 × 2) * After SCB-110A overhaul: (1960s) * 6 × 5"/54 caliber Mark 16 guns, (6 × 1) or (3 × 1); After SCB-101.66 modernization: (1980s) * 3 × Phalanx CIWS (1 × 3)
- Armor: As built: (1949); Portside belt: 7.6 inch; Starboard belt: 7 inch; Lower wdge and upper belt: 1.96 inch; Flight deck: 3.5 inch; Hangar deck: 2 inch; Main deck: 2 inch; Steering gear compartment: 2.48-7.6 inches; Main longitudinal bulkhead: 1.25 inch; Transverse bulkhead: 6.29 inch; Steering gear compartment bulkhead: 6.29 inch; Galley deck: 76'; Forecastle deck: 67'9; 2nd deck: 49'3; 3rd deck: 41'0; 4th deck: 31'6
- Aircraft carried: Up to 130 (World War II); 65-70 (1980s)
- Aviation facilities: As built: (1949); 2 × centreline elevators; 1 × deck edge elevator; 2 × H-41 hydraulic catapults; 3 × arresting wires; 6 × barricades; As retired: At least 4 or more bomb elevators; 2 hangar bays; 3 deck edges elevators (2 starboard and 1 portside)

USS Coral Sea (CV/CVB/CVA-43), a Midway-class aircraft carrier, was the third ship of the United States Navy to be named for the Battle of the Coral Sea. She earned the affectionate nickname "Ageless Warrior" through her long career. Initially classified as an aircraft carrier with hull classification symbol CV-43, the contract to build the ship was awarded to Newport News Shipbuilding of Newport News, Virginia, on 14 June 1943. She was reclassified as a "Large Aircraft Carrier" with hull classification symbol CVB-43 on 15 July 1943. Her keel was laid down on 10 July 1944 in Shipway 10. She was launched on 2 April 1946, sponsored by Thomas C. Kinkaid and commissioned on 1 October 1947 with Captain A.P. Storrs III in command.

Before 8 May 1945, the aircraft carrier CVB-42 had been known as USS Coral Sea; after that date, CVB-42 was renamed in honor of Franklin D. Roosevelt, the late President, and CV-43 was named Coral Sea.

Coral Sea was one of the last U.S Navy carriers to be completed with a straight flight deck, with an angled flight deck added on during later modernizations. All subsequent newly built U.S Navy carriers have had the angled deck included as part of the ship's construction, and the other two ships of this class were also converted. While Coral Sea was eventually decommissioned and scrapped, her sistership, USS Midway, is preserved as a museum ship in San Diego, California, in the 21st century.

== Early milestones ==
The ship promptly began a series of career milestones when, on 27 April 1948, two P2V-2 Neptunes, piloted by Commander Thomas D. Davies and Lieutenant Commander John P. Wheatley, made jet-assisted takeoffs (JATO) from the carrier as she steamed off Norfolk, Virginia. This was the first carrier launchings of planes of this size and weight. The Coral Sea sailed from Norfolk on 7 June 1948 for a midshipmen cruise to the Mediterranean and Caribbean, and returned on 11 August.

After an overhaul period, Coral Sea was again operating off the Virginia Capes. On 7 March 1949, a P2V-3C Neptune, piloted by Captain John T. Hayward of VC-5, was launched from the carrier with a 10,000-lb load of dummy bombs. The aircraft flew across the continent, dropped its load on the West Coast, and returned nonstop to land at the Naval Air Station Patuxent River, Maryland. The mission proved the concept of carrier-based atomic bomb attacks. Following training in the Caribbean, Coral Sea sailed on 3 May 1949 for her first tour of duty in the Mediterranean with the Sixth Fleet, returning 28 September.

== Operations in the 1950s ==
On 21 April 1950, the first carrier takeoff of an AJ-1 Savage heavy attack bomber was made from Coral Sea by Captain John T. Hayward of VC-5. The remainder of the pilots of the squadron completed carrier qualifications on board Coral Sea in this aircraft on 31 August, marking the introduction of this long-range atomic-attack bomber to carrier operations. At this time, she returned to the Mediterranean for duty with the Sixth Fleet from 9 September 1950 to 1 February 1951.

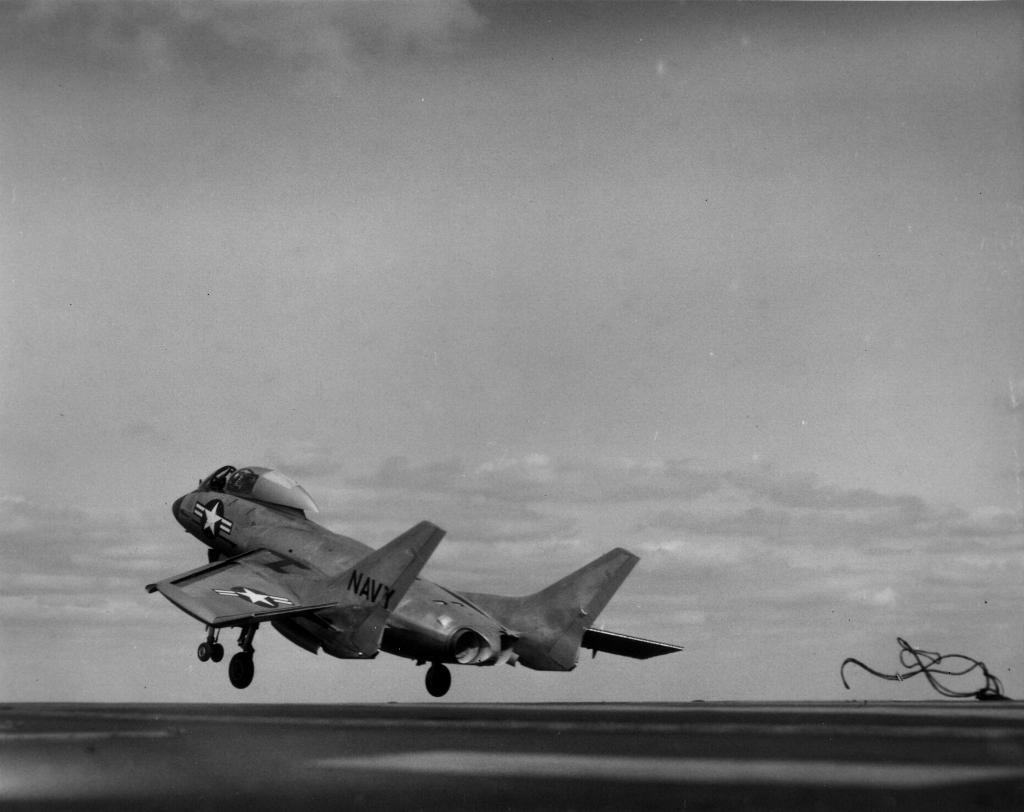
An F7U-3 Cutlass was launched from Coral Sea in 1952.

An overhaul and local operations upon her return, as well as training with Air Group 17, prepared her for a return to the Mediterranean once more on 20 March 1951. As flagship for Commander, Carrier Division 6, she took part in a NATO Exercise, Beehive I. She returned to Norfolk on 6 October for local and Caribbean operations, next sailing for the Mediterranean on 19 April 1952. While on service with the Sixth Fleet, she visited Yugoslavia in September and carried Marshal Josip Broz Tito on a one-day cruise to observe carrier operations. The ship was reclassified as an "Attack Aircraft Carrier" with hull classification symbol CVA-43 on 1 October 1952 while still at sea and returned to Norfolk, Virginia, for overhaul 12 October.

In November 1952, Herbert D. Riley assumed command of Coral Sea and she participated in the training of pilots in carrier operations off of the Virginia Capes and Naval Station Mayport, Mayport, Florida. She sailed for a tour of duty in the Mediterranean in April 1953, visited Spain, and took part in the NATO Exercise Black Wave with Deputy Secretary of Defense R. M. Kyes on board as an observer. Returning to Norfolk on 21 October, she carried out tests for the Bureau of Aeronautics and trained members of the Naval Reserve at Naval Station Mayport and Guantanamo Bay Naval Base.

Coral Sea returned to the Mediterranean from 7 July to 20 December 1954, and during this tour, was visited by Spanish Generalissimo Francisco Franco as she lay off of Valencia. On her next tour of duty in the Mediterranean from 23 March to 29 September 1955, she called at Istanbul and participated in NATO exercises.

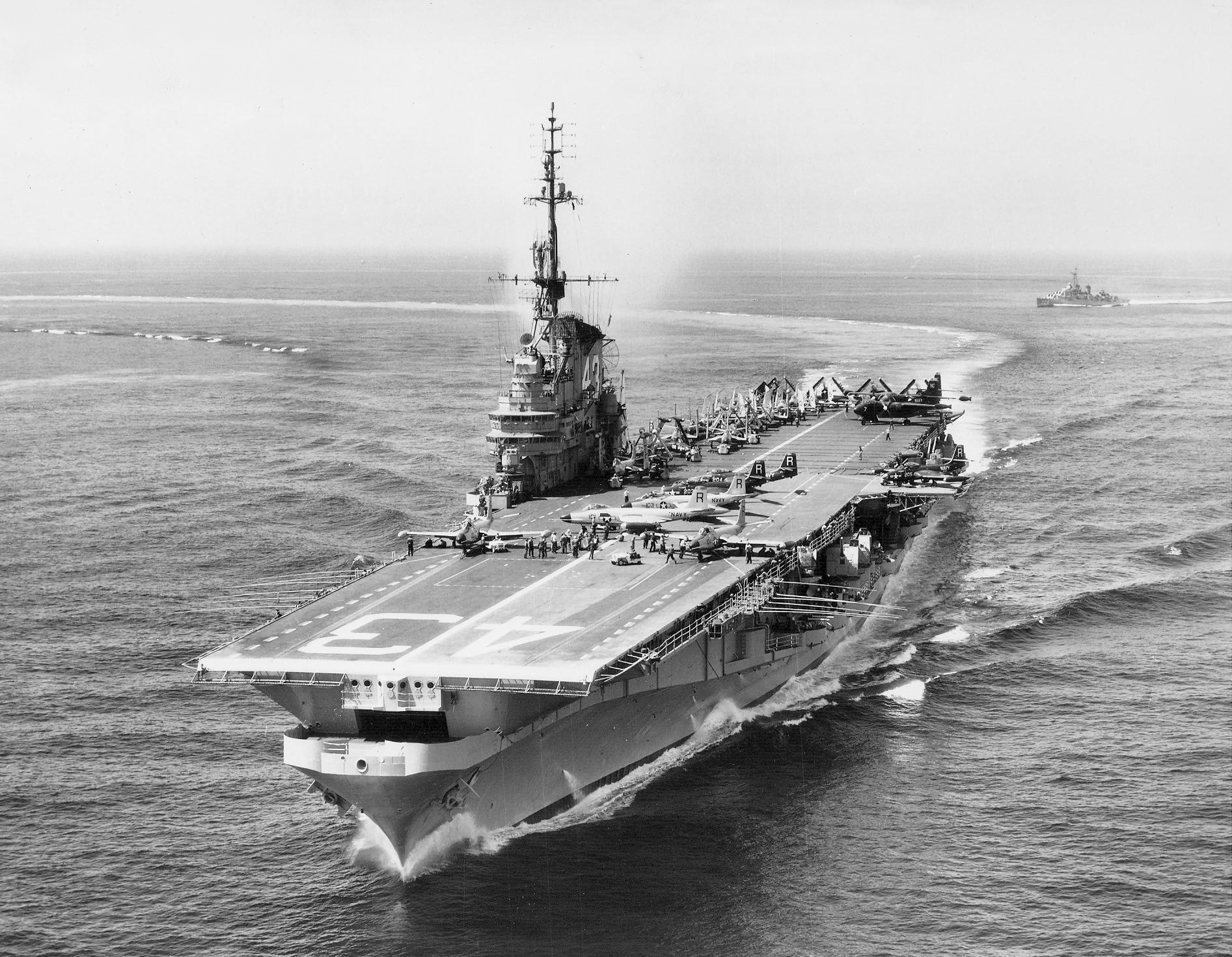
Coral Sea during her 1955 Mediterranean cruise

Sailing from Norfolk on 23 July 1956 for Mayport, Florida, to embark Carrier Air Group 10, Coral Sea continued on to the Mediterranean on her next tour. She participated in NATO exercises and received King Paul of Greece and his consort, Friederike Luise Thyra of Hanover, on board as visitors in October. During the Suez Crisis, Coral Sea evacuated American citizens from the troubled area and stood by off Egypt until November.

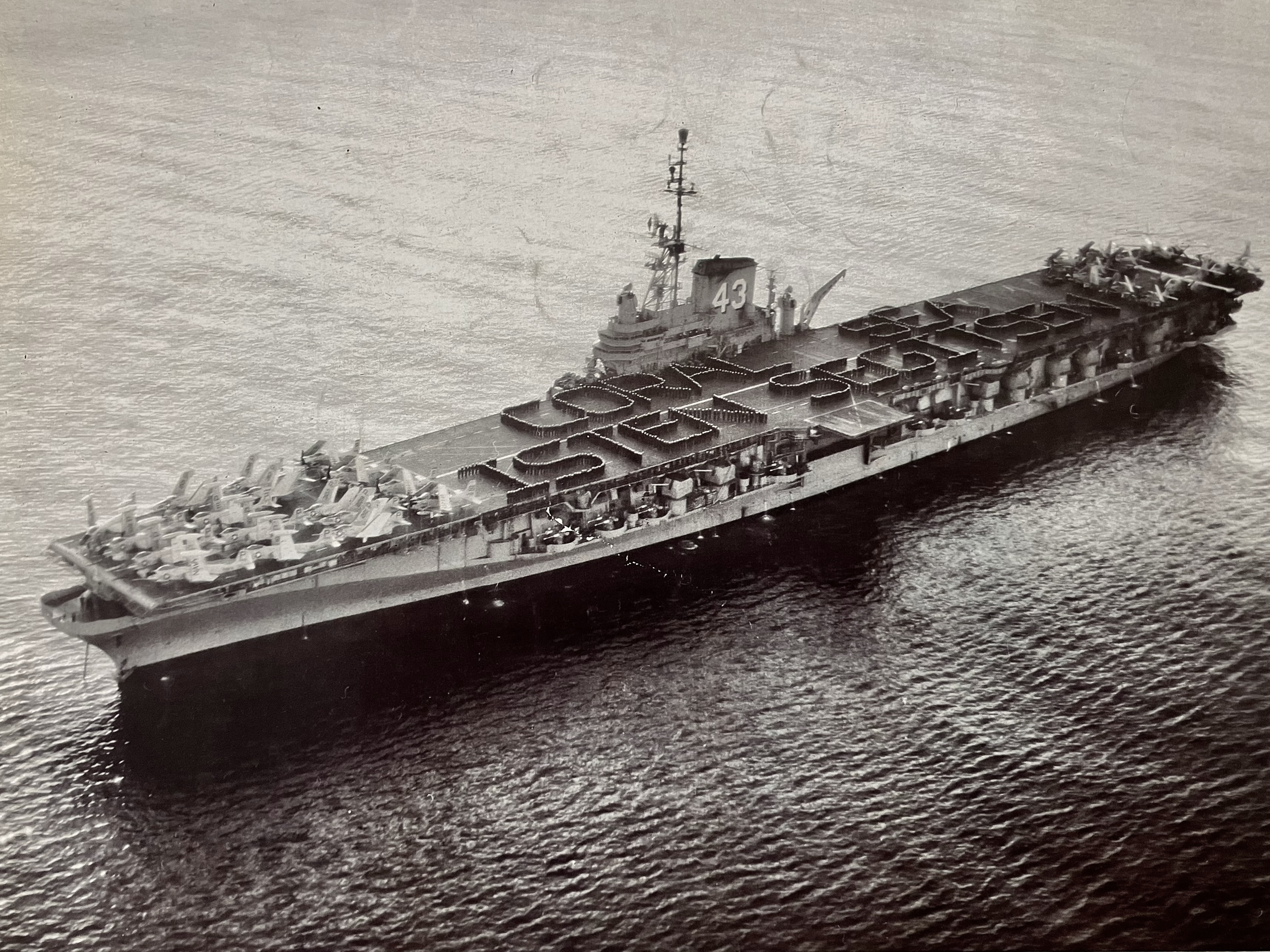
The message of the sailors of the USS Coral Sea (CVA-43) to the revolution of 1956: "God help you!"

Sometime between late 1956 and early 1957, a so far unnamed crew member of Hungarian origin, possibly the ship's helmsman, managed to convince the crew of the Coral Sea to donate their annual Christmas funds to the refugees of the Hungarian Revolution, instead. Having made a unified decision, the crew members donated $7,500 and lined up for an aerial publicity shot, displaying Isten Segítsen! (English: God Help You). The U.S. government continued to promote this generous gesture by organizing trips for Hungarian refugees to see Coral Sea at Naples.

Coral Sea returned to Norfolk on 11 February 1957. She cleared that port on 26 February and visited Santos, Brazil; Valparaíso, Chile; and Balboa, Canal Zone, before arriving at Bremerton, Washington, on 15 April.

Coral Sea was decommissioned at the Puget Sound Naval Shipyard on 24 May 1957 to receive a major conversion (SCB 110A), which included a longer, angled deck canted 3° more than the previous overhauls of her sister ships. As the centerline elevators were relocated to the starboard deck edge forward and aft of the island, Coral Sea became the first carrier to mount an elevator on the port quarter resembling the more efficient deck layout of the Kitty Hawk class then under construction. Other improvements included new steam catapults, an enclosed hurricane bow, hull blisters, and removal of the armor belt and several antiaircraft guns. Upon completion, she was recommissioned on 25 January 1960 and rejoined the fleet. During September 1960, she conducted training with her new air group along the West Coast, then sailed in September for a tour of duty with the Seventh Fleet in the Far East on her first WestPac (Western Pacific cruise). She recorded her 100,000th arrested landing in October 1961.

== Vietnam and operations in the 1960s to early 1970s ==
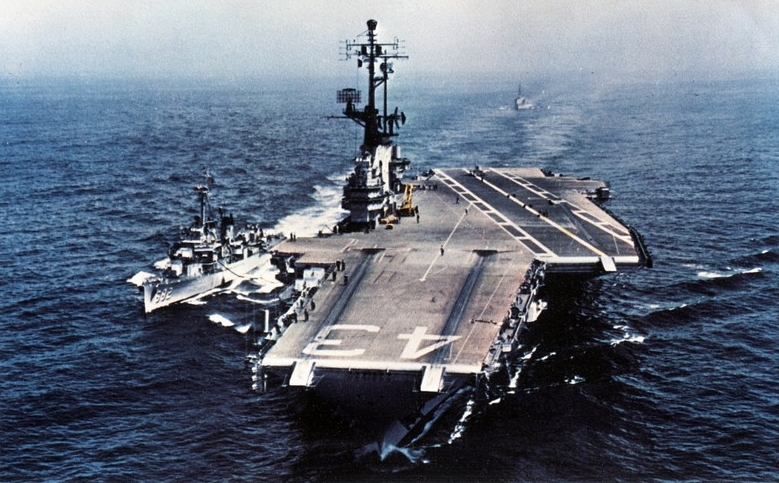
Coral Sea in 1960 following her major reconstruction

Installation of the pilot landing-aid television (PLAT) system was completed on Coral Sea on 14 December 1961. She was the first carrier to have PLAT installed for operational use. Designed to provide a videotape of every landing, the system proved useful for instructional purposes and in the analysis of landing accidents, thereby making it an invaluable tool in the promotion of safety. By 1963, all attack carriers had been equipped with PLAT and plans were underway for installation in the CVSs and at shore stations.

Following the Gulf of Tonkin incident in August, Coral Sea departed on 7 December 1964 for duty with the Seventh Fleet. On 7 February 1965, her aircraft, along with those from Ranger and Hancock, conducted Operation Flaming Dart against the military barracks and staging areas near Đồng Hới in the southern sector of North Vietnam. The raids were in retaliation for a damaging Viet Cong attack on installations around Pleiku in South Vietnam. On 26 March, the Seventh Fleet units began their participation in Operation Rolling Thunder, a systematic bombing of military targets throughout North Vietnam. Pilots from Coral Sea struck island and coastal radar stations in the vicinity of Vinh. On 3 April Vietnam People's Air Force MiG-17s attacked aircraft from Coral Sea and Hancock in the first United States aerial combat of the Vietnam conflict. A Coral Sea RF-8 took the first photographs of a North Vietnamese surface-to-air missile site on 5 April. Coral Sea remained on deployment until returning home on 1 November 1965.

Coral Sea made another Westpac/Vietnam deployment from 29 July 1966 to 23 February 1967.

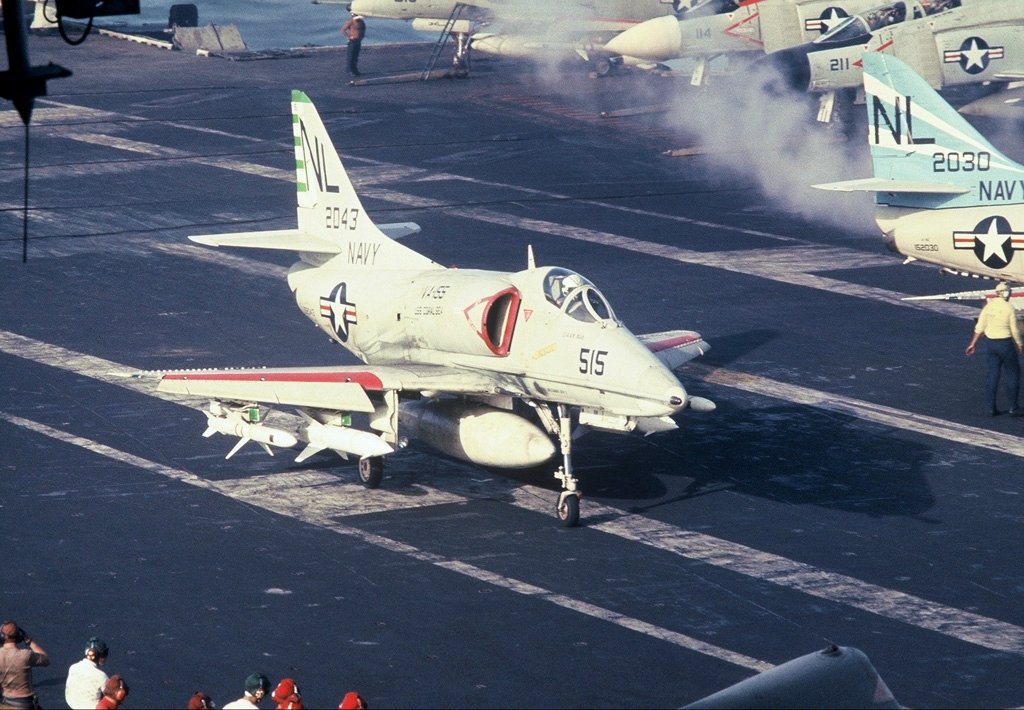
A-4E on the deck of the USS Coral Sea, 1967

On 25 October 1967, while Coral Sea was stationed in the Gulf of Tonkin, a Zuni rocket ignited during a routine test in the forward assembly area. The accident resulted in nine sailors suffering burns, with three in critical condition. The injured were promptly flown to Clark Air Force Base for intensive treatment. The rocket motor caused damage when it tore into a bulkhead about 20 feet from the testing area; however, the flames were quickly extinguished by the crew, and the injured men were transported to the sick bay for emergency care. Despite the incident, damage to the ship was minimal, and Coral Sea remained fully operational. The carrier continued her scheduled operations, launching airstrikes the following morning before departing Yankee Station on 27 October.

In the summer of 1967, the city of San Francisco adopted the ship as "San Francisco's Own", and the city and ship enjoyed a formal, official relationship. In July 1968, prior to a deployment to Vietnam, Coral Sea participated in the carrier trials of the US Navy's proposed new interceptor, the General Dynamics–Grumman F-111B.

The ship continued to make WestPac/Vietnam deployments until 1975: 26 July 1967 to 6 April 1968; 7 September 1968 to 15 April 1969; 23 September 1969 to 1 July 1970; 12 November 1971 to 17 July 1972; 9 March 1973 to 8 November; and 5 December 1974 to 2 July 1975. Operations by the Navy and the Marine Corps aircraft in Vietnam expanded significantly throughout April 1972, with a total of 4,833 Navy sorties in the south and 1,250 in the north. Coral Sea, along with Hancock, was on Yankee Station when the North Vietnamese Easter Offensive began. They were joined in early April by Kitty Hawk and Constellation. On 16 April 1972, their aircraft flew 57 sorties in the Haiphong area in support of U.S. Air Force B-52 Stratofortress strikes on the Haiphong petroleum product-storage area in an operation known as Freedom Porch.

After refitting, from 1970 through to 1971, and during refresher training south to San Diego, Coral Sea on her return trip to Alameda caught fire in the communications department. The fire spread so fast that Captain William H. Harris commanded that the carrier be placed just offshore between San Mateo and Santa Barbara to abandon ship if the fire could not be put under control. Several communications personnel were trapped, and RM-2 Robert Bilbo and RM-3 Billy Larremore pulled many shipmates out of the burning and smoke-filled compartments. They received the Navy and Marine Corp Medal. Lance Corporal Thomas P Howard Jr. of ships Mar/Det received a "Meritorious Mast" from Captain Harris as a result of his location and rescue of shipmates overcome by toxic smoke in security weapon space. An oxygen-breathing apparatus was L/Cpl Howard's only breathing protection at the time.

Operation Pocket Money, the mining campaign against principal North Vietnamese ports, was launched 9 May 1972. Early that morning, an EC-121 aircraft took off from Da Nang Air Base to provide support for the mining operation. A short time later, Kitty Hawk launched 17 ordnance-delivering sorties against the Nam Định railroad siding as a diversionary air tactic. Poor weather, however, forced the planes to divert to secondary targets. Coral Sea launched three A-6A Intruders and six A-7E Corsair II aircraft loaded with naval mines and one EKA-3B Skywarrior in support of the mining operation directed against the outer approaches to Haiphong Harbor. The mining aircraft departed the vicinity of Coral Sea timed to execute the mining at precisely 09:00 local time to coincide with President Richard M. Nixon's public announcement in Washington that naval mines had been seeded. The Intruder flight led by the CAG, Commander Roger E. Sheets, was composed of Marine Corps aircraft from VMA-224 and headed for the inner channel. The Corsairs, led by Commander Leonard E. Giuliani and made up of aircraft from VA-94 and VA-22, were designated to mine the outer segment of the channel. Each aircraft carried four MK52-2 mines. Captain William R. Carr, USMC, the bombardier/navigator in the lead plane, established the critical attack azimuth and timed the naval mine releases. The first mine was dropped at 08:59, with the last of the field of 36 mines at 09:01. Twelve mines were placed in the inner harbor and the remaining 24 in the outer. All mines were set with 72-hour arming delays, thus permitting merchant ships time for departure or a change in destination consistent with the President's public warning. It was the beginning of a mining campaign that planted over 11,000 MK36-type destructor and 108 special Mk 52-2 mines over the next eight months.

== 1971: Crewmen petition against the Vietnam War ==
In 1971, widespread dissatisfaction with the Vietnam War led to an unusual action by at least 1000 crew members who formed the on-ship organization named Stop Our Ship and signed a petition against the war. The petition stated that the signers "do not believe in the Vietnam War" and that Coral Sea "should not go to Vietnam".

On 6 November 1971, over 300 men from Coral Sea marched in an antiwar demonstration in San Francisco and on 12 November 1971, around 600-1200 protestors demonstrated outside of Naval Air Station Alameda to encourage sailors to not sail with the ship. Thirty-five men missed her departure after the Berkeley City Council and 10 churches offered sanctuary. While this number is not unusual for a ship this size, at least one military service member sought sanctuary.

The petition and demonstrations by the sailors of Coral Sea were part of a larger movement of antiwar protests by military service members. Earlier in 1971, about 400 servicemen in Saigon signed a petition against the war, and nine sailors in Hawaii took sanctuary in a church and missed the sailing of Constellation. (In contrast, the Coral Sea crewmen did not want their protest "to be a thing like the Constellation" and therefore likely were not looking for sanctuary.) "These 'flattop revolts' expanded the next year, as sailors signed petitions or disrupted operations on Kitty Hawk, Oriskany, Ticonderoga, America, and Enterprise. Sabotage on Ranger and Forrestal prevented their scheduled port departures, while aviators became increasingly concerned about their role in the bombing campaign and questioned the war openly."

== Paris peace accords, fall of Saigon, Mayaguez incident ==
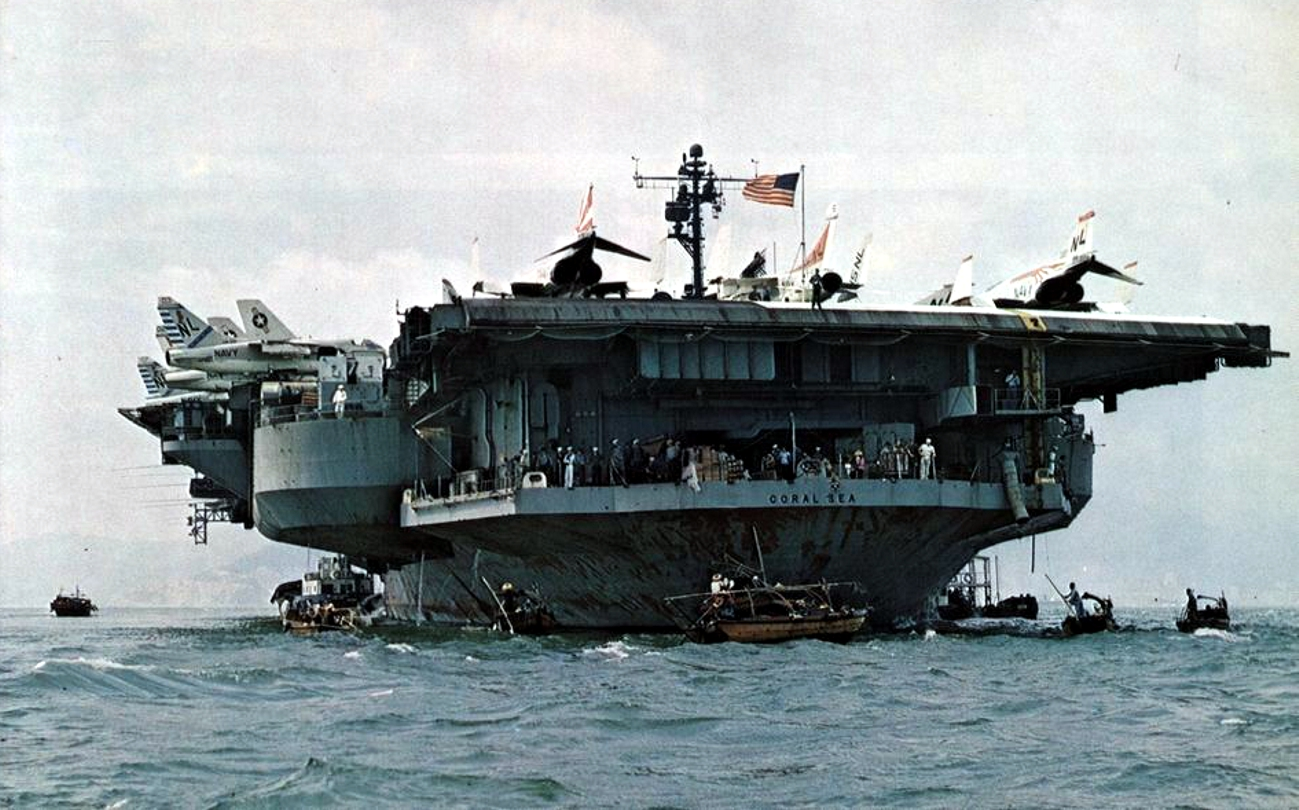
USS Coral Sea (CVA-43) anchored at Hong Kong in 1972

The Paris Peace Accords, ending hostilities in Vietnam, were signed on 23 January 1973, ending four years of talks. North Vietnam released nearly 600 American prisoners by 1 April 1973, and the last U.S. combat troops departed Vietnam on 27 January 1973. However, the war was not over for the Vietnamese. By spring 1975, the North was advancing on the South. Coral Sea, Midway, Hancock, Enterprise, and Okinawa responded on 19 April 1975 to the waters off South Vietnam when North Vietnam overran two-thirds of South Vietnam. On 29–30 April 1975, Operation Frequent Wind was carried out by Seventh Fleet forces. Hundreds of U.S. personnel and Vietnamese were evacuated from Saigon to the ships of the Seventh Fleet lying off Vũng Tàu. South Vietnam surrendered to the North on 30 April 1975.

On 12 to 14 May 1975, Coral Sea participated with other Navy, Air Force, and Marine Corps forces in the Mayaguez incident, the recovery of the U.S. merchant ship SS Mayaguez and her 39 crew, illegally seized on 12 May in international waters by Khmer Rouge gunboats. Protective air strikes were flown from the carrier against the Cambodian mainland naval and air installations as Air Force helicopters with 288 Marines from Battalion Landing Teams 2 and 9 were launched from U Tapao, Thailand, and landed at Koh Tang Island to rescue the Mayaguez's crew and secure the ship. Eighteen marines, airmen, and Navy corpsmen were lost in the action. For her action, Coral Sea was presented the Meritorious Unit Commendation on 6 July 1976. Meanwhile, she had been reclassified as a "Multi-Purpose Aircraft Carrier", returning to hull classification symbol CV-43, on 30 June 1975.

== Iran hostage crisis, final Western Pacific cruise ==
On 4 November 1979, militant followers of the Ayatollah Khomeini (who had come to power following the overthrow of the Shah of Iran) seized the US Embassy in Tehran and held 63 Americans hostage. Thus began the Iran hostage crisis.

Coral Sea relieved Midway in the northern part of the Arabian Sea, off the coast of Iran, on 5 February 1980. This operating area was nicknamed Gonzo Station by the men on the ships operating there, apparently because of its vicinity to Iran and the assumption that war with Iran was likely.

Later, along with Nimitz and other ships in company, Coral Sea participated in Operation Evening Light, the unsuccessful and aborted rescue attempt of 24 April 1980. (Their aircraft played a supporting role.) The crew of Coral Sea and other ships in the company received the Navy Expeditionary Medal for their efforts. By the time the ship pulled into Subic Bay, the Philippines, for a port call on 9 May 1980, the crew had spent 102 consecutive days at sea, mostly off the coast of Iran. (The Iran hostage crisis ended on 20 January 1981 when Ronald Reagan succeeded Jimmy Carter as President of the United States and Iran released the Americans.)

At this time (1979–1981), the ship was commanded by Captain (later Admiral) Richard Dunleavy, who was to play a role in the Tailhook scandal, which forced him into retirement. However, while commanding Coral Sea, he was considered an excellent commanding officer by his crew, who respected him greatly, even though they worked long, difficult hours under him and he could be a strict disciplinarian.

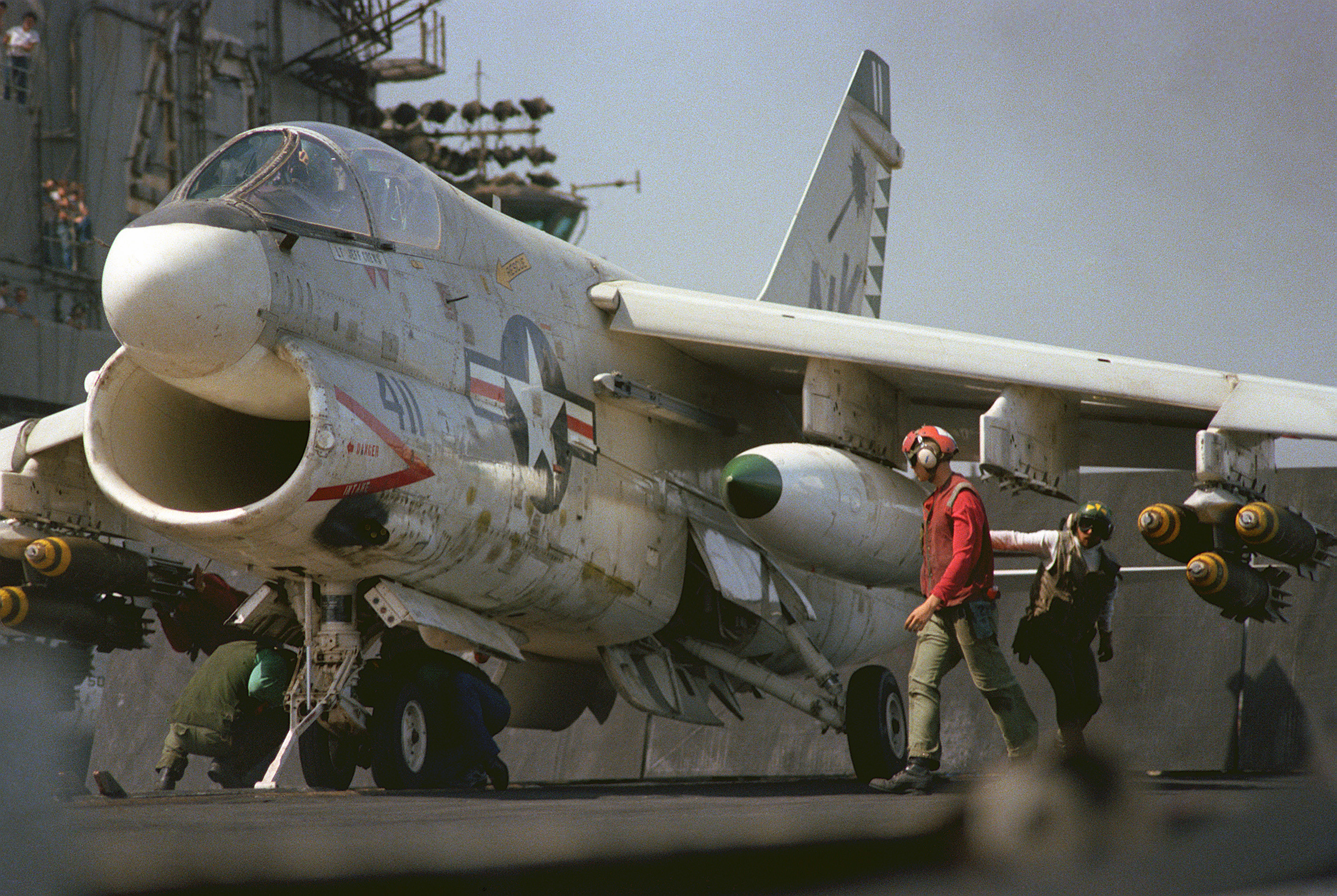
A-7E on the carrier's deck catapult in 1980

On 10 June 1980, Coral Sea returned to her homeport of Alameda. Shortly after her return, the San Francisco Bay Area press reported the theft of a set of golden bear statues from the ship. These statues had been presented by the city of San Francisco after the city had adopted the ship as "San Francisco's Own". Two sailors from Coral Sea were caught with the statues after attempting to sell them, and the sailors were subsequently court-martialed and sentenced to prison. All of the statues were recovered in good shape.

The ship embarked on her final Western Pacific deployment on 20 August 1981. After making port calls at Pearl Harbor and Subic Bay, the Philippines, she operated in the South China Sea. After a port call at Singapore, Coral Sea headed to the Indian Ocean, where she relieved America at Gonzo Station and operated with Royal Navy units in GonzoEx 2-81 (17–23 November).

The Coral Sea battle group, under Rear Admiral Tom Brown, was involved in exercises with the Royal Navy under Rear Admiral Sandy Woodward – who operated with HMS Glamorgan as his flagship. During one exercise, Woodward was able to manoeuver Glamorgan into a position where he could have "sunk" Coral Sea with Exocet missiles. The result of this exercise played a part in the belief of Admiral Woodward that the British should sink Argentine cruiser General Belgrano because of the fear of a similar situation arising between that ship and the British aircraft carriers Hermes and Invincible during the Falklands War.

Later, Coral Sea participated in Exercise Bright Star 82, an exercise involving the defense of Egypt and the Suez Canal (4–9 December). Relieved on 17 December 1981 by Constellation, she departed Gonzo Station and called at Pattaya, Thailand, after 98 consecutive days at sea. After departing Pattaya, the ship called at Subic Bay and Hong Kong. Coral Sea then operated in the Sea of Japan before making a port call at Sasebo, Japan. After departing Japan, Coral Sea made another port call at Subic Bay, then again at Pearl Harbor before steaming to California. The ship arrived at her home port of Alameda on 23 March 1982. Coral Sea then began upkeep, training, and operations off of California. In late July 1982, she served as a movie prop in the filming of portions of the motion picture The Right Stuff.

== World cruise, deployments to the Mediterranean, final years ==
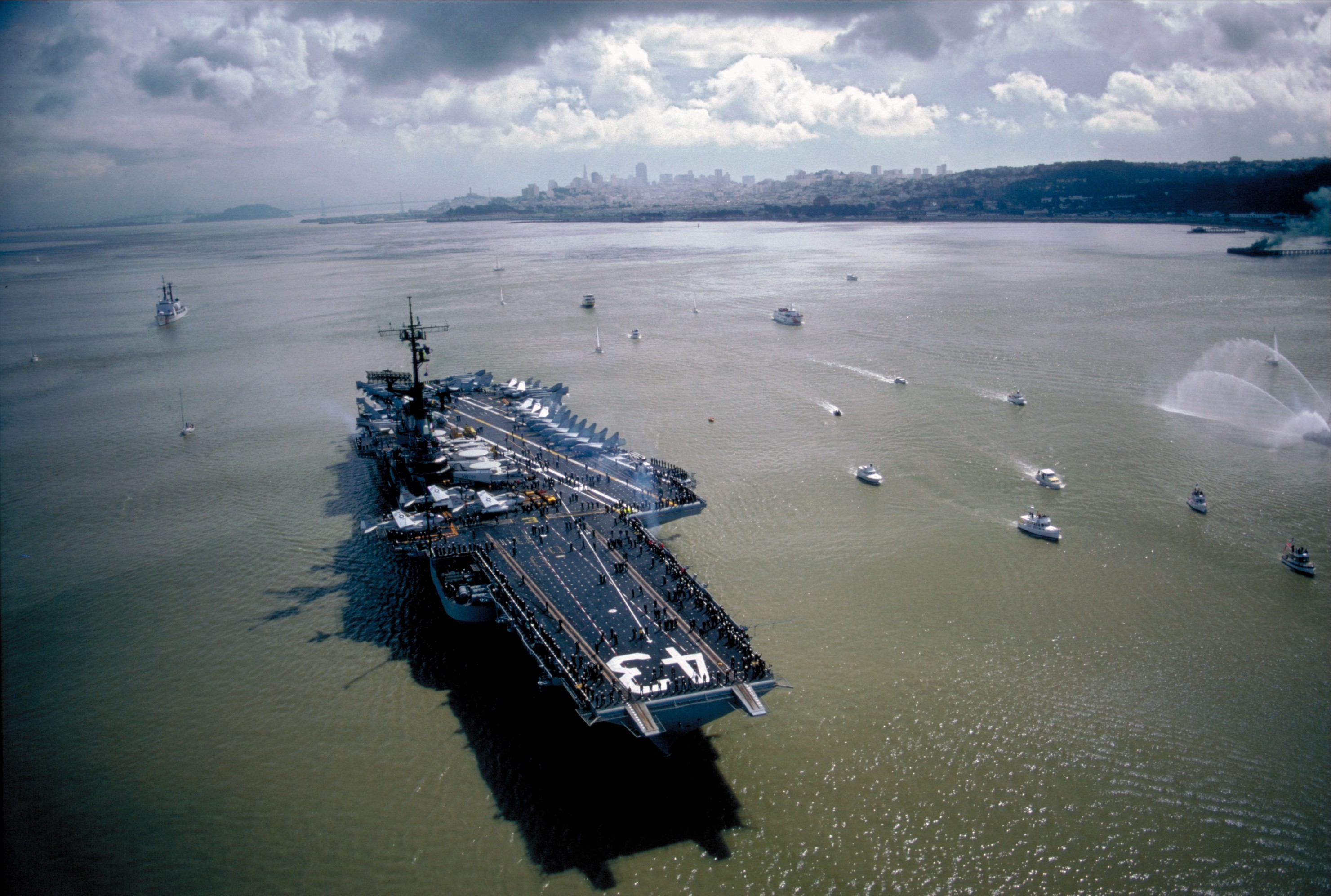
USS Coral Sea (CV-43) near San Francisco in March 1983

On 25 March 1983, Coral Sea, having been reassigned to the Atlantic Fleet, left Alameda for her new homeport of Norfolk. The Navy sent the ship on a six-month, around-the-world cruise, with ports of call in five countries. Coral Sea was replaced on the West Coast by Carl Vinson.

On 1 March 1984, Carrier Air Wing 13 was established. The wing made three deployments aboard Coral Sea from 1 October 1985 to 30 September 1989.

On 11 April 1985, while on refresher training with her air wing in the Guantánamo Bay area, Coral Sea collided with the Ecuadorian tanker ship Napo and subsequently underwent two months of repairs at Norfolk Naval Shipyard in Portsmouth, Virginia. This resulted in the skipper along with four other officers being relieved of duty.

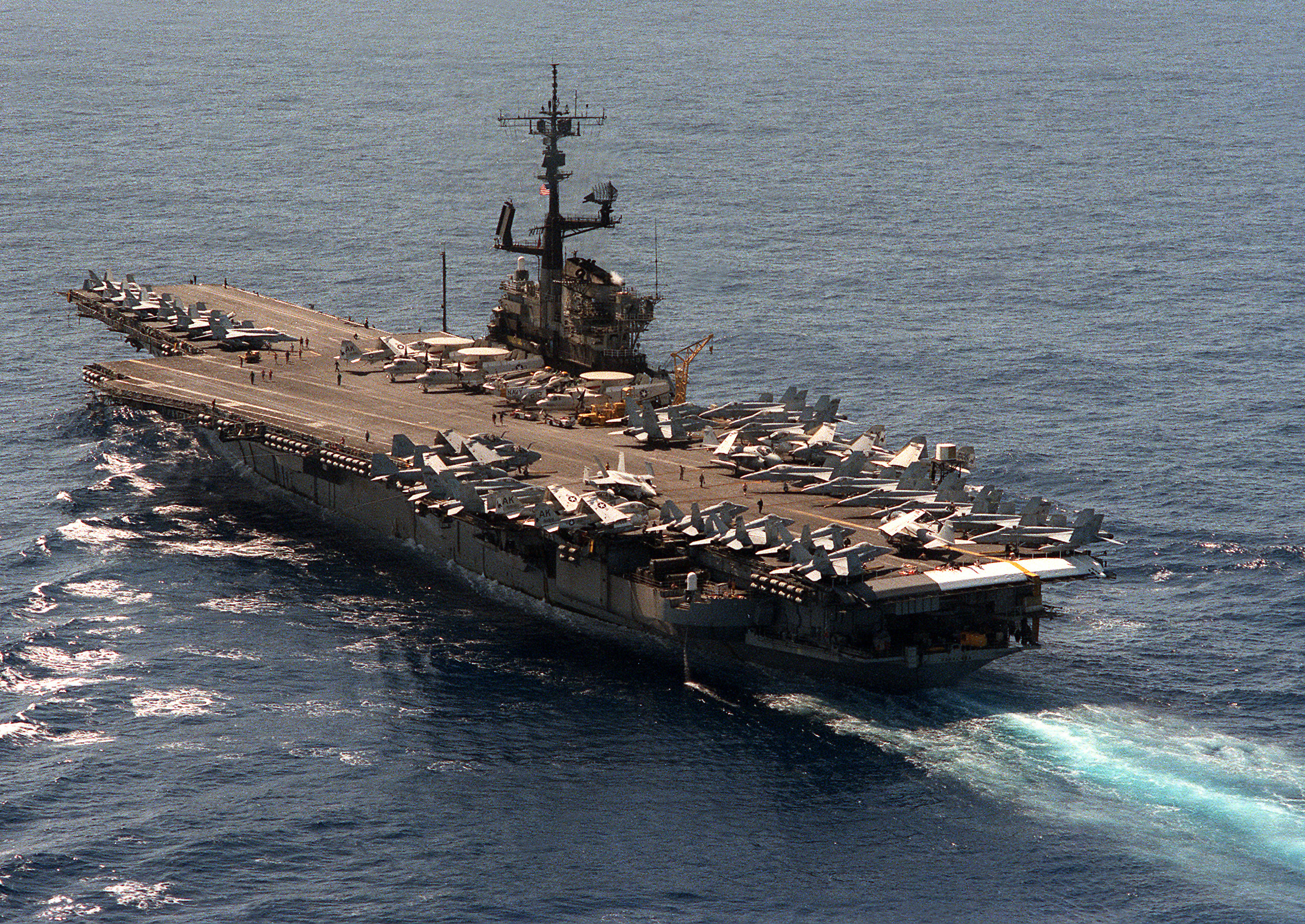
USS Coral Sea underway in the Atlantic Ocean, 1986

On 13 October 1985, Coral Sea returned to the Mediterranean for her first Sixth Fleet deployment since 1957. Commanded by Captain Robert H. Ferguson, with CVW-13 embarked, it was also the first deployment of the new F/A-18 Hornet to the Mediterranean. The Hornets were assigned to VFA-131, VFA-132, VMFA-314, and VMFA-323 on Coral Sea.

On 2 January 1986, EA-6B Prowlers from VAQ-135 reported aboard. The squadron was called on a "No Notice Deployment" by the Joint Chiefs of Staff to augment CVW-13 with electronic countermeasures/jamming support.

On 24 March 1986, Libyan Armed Forces units fired missiles at Sixth Fleet forces operating in the Gulf of Sidra after declaring international waters as their own. A missile (originating from an SA-5 missile site at Sirte) attack on CV-43's aircraft (Prowler/Hornet package) conducting a "Blue Darter" fell short and dropped into the Mediterranean. VFA-131 F/A-18's from Coral Sea and America flew combat air patrols, protecting the carrier groups from Libyan aircraft. The Hornets were frequently called upon to intercept and challenge numerous MiG-23s, MiG-25s, Su-22s, and Mirages sent out by Libya to harass the fleet.

On 5 April 1986, in response to the US show of force, the La Belle Discothèque in West Berlin, Federal Republic of Germany, was bombed, resulting in the death of one U.S. serviceman and many injured.

On 15 April 1986, aircraft from Coral Sea and America, as well as USAF F-111Fs from RAF Lakenheath in the UK, struck targets in Libya as part of Operation El Dorado Canyon. The Hornets went into action for the first time, flying several ship-to-shore air strikes against Libyan shore installations that were harassing the fleet. During this action, the Hornets from Coral Sea attacked and destroyed the SA-5 missile site at Sirte, which had been "painting" U.S. aircraft on its radars. This was the combat debut for the Hornet and incidentally marked the first combat use of the AGM-88 HARM antiradiation missile. The Hornets attacked the SAM sites in bad weather and at wave-top heights. All of them returned without mishap.

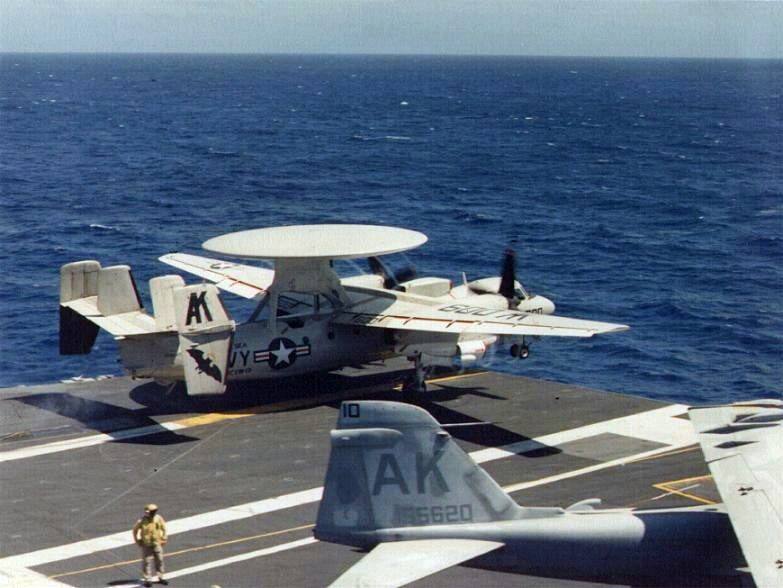
An E-2C launches from the USS Coral Sea, 1989

Coral Sea continued deployments to the Mediterranean and Indian Ocean areas throughout the remainder of the 1980s. In 1987, she developed the "Coral Sea configuration" in which two attack squadrons on board used a shared maintenance program, helping to streamline aircraft maintenance. On 19 April 1989, while conducting training in the Caribbean, the ship responded to a call for assistance from the battleship Iowa, due to an explosion in her number-two gun turret in which 47 crew members were killed. The explosive ordnance disposal team from Coral Sea removed volatile powder charges from the ship's 16-inch (406 mm) guns. Coral Sea also dispatched a surgical team and medical supplies. Medevac and logistical support to Iowa were provided by Coral Sea's deployed helicopter squadron HS-17 (Neptune's Raiders) flying the Sikorsky SH-3H, along with VC-8 flying the Sikorsky SH-3G aircraft from Naval Station Roosevelt Roads, Puerto Rico.

After her last deployment to the Mediterranean, Coral Sea returned to Norfolk for the final time on 30 September 1989. Her last port of call was Halifax, Nova Scotia, after a vote was taken by the crew to choose her last port before going back to her homeport of Norfolk to be decommissioned.

== Decommissioning and scrapping ==
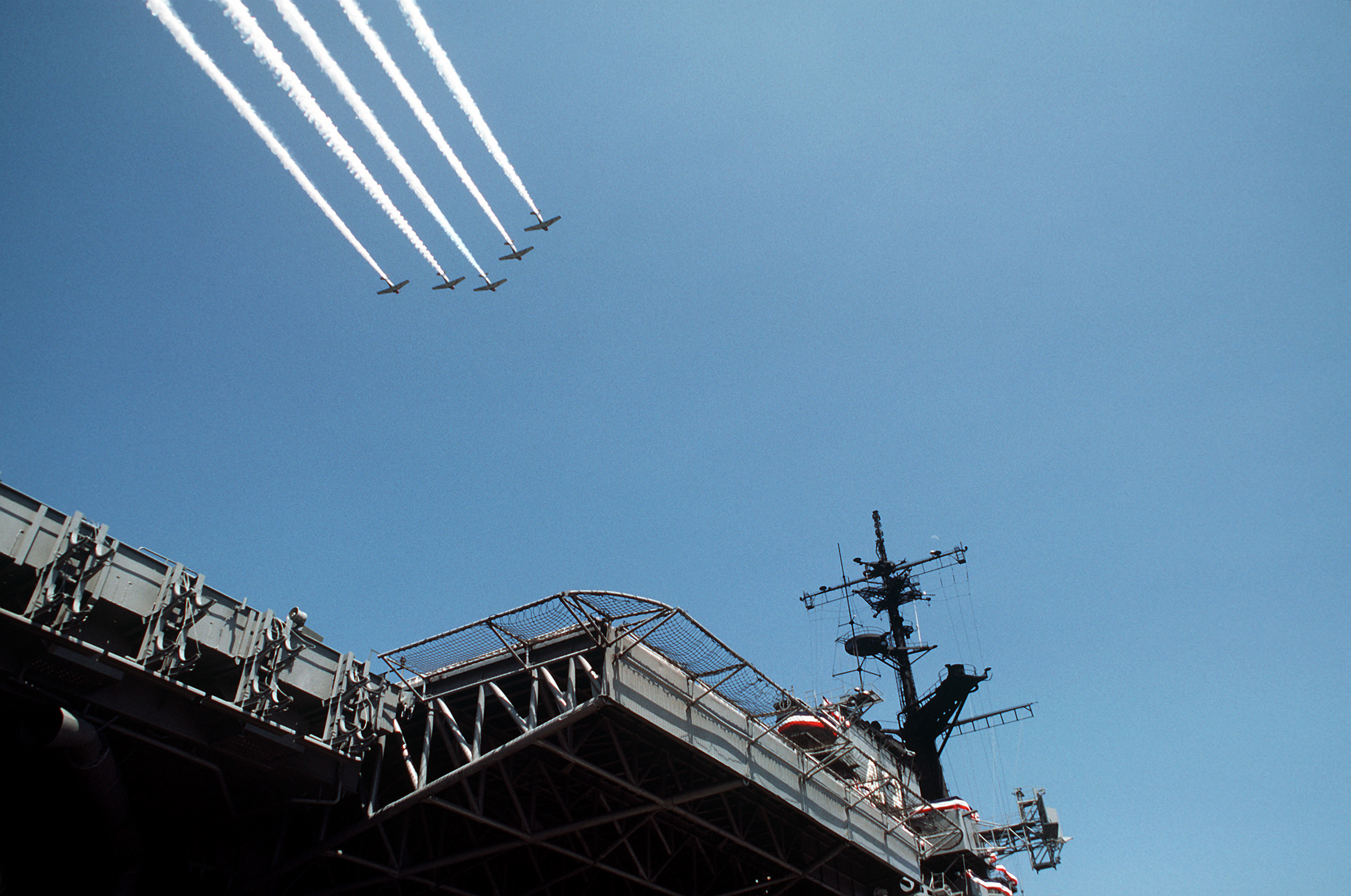
Aerobatic flight over the carrier during the ship's decommissioning ceremony in April 1990

After nearly 43 years of service, Coral Sea was decommissioned on 26 April 1990. She was stricken from the Naval Vessel Register two days later. She left Naval Station Norfolk on 2 November 1990 under tow from USNS Apache. Coral Sea was moored at the Philadelphia Naval Shipyard to await her fate. On 7 May 1993, she was sold for scrap, minus her electronics, weapons, and other usable equipment, by the Defense Reutilization and Marketing Service to Seawitch Salvage of Baltimore. Scrapping was delayed by numerous financial, legal, and environmental issues. A series of articles by the Baltimore Sun about the problems involved with the scrapping of the Coral Sea and other Navy vessels earned it the 1998 Pulitzer Prize in Investigative Reporting. At nearly 70,000 tons, Coral Sea was the largest vessel ever scrapped up to that date. The company attempted to sell the hull to China for scrapping, but the Navy blocked the sale in court. The scrapping continued off and on for several years until finally completed on 8 September 2000.

One of her anchors is now on display in the Battle of Coral Sea Memorial, Townsville, Australia. It was presented to the memorial on 8 May 1992, by the Commander of the Seventh Fleet and former commanding officer of Coral Sea, Vice Admiral Stanley R. Arthur. The other anchor is at the Citadel in Charleston, South Carolina.

== Awards and decorations ==

Navy Unit Commendation with six stars		Meritorious Unit Commendation with four stars
Navy Expeditionary Medal with two stars	Navy Occupation Service Medal	National Defense Service Medal with one star
Armed Forces Expeditionary Medal with twelve stars	Vietnam Service Medal with ten stars	Humanitarian Service Medal
Sea Service Deployment Ribbon with thirteen stars	Republic of Vietnam Meritorious; Unit Citation (Gallantry Cross)	Republic of Vietnam Campaign; Medal
