= John T. Hayward =

American admiral (1908–1999)

John Tucker Hayward
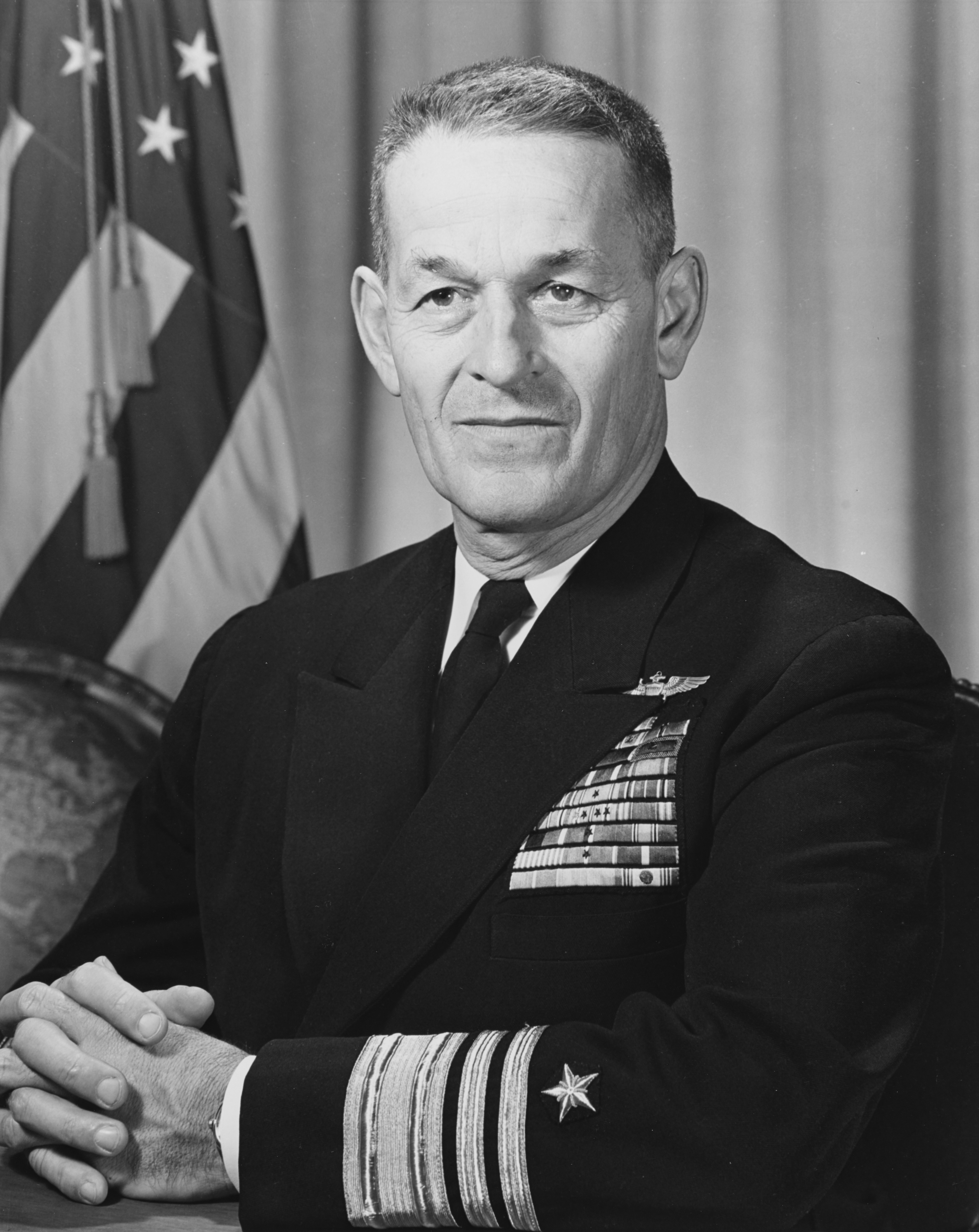
- Official portrait, 1959
- Born: 15 November 1908; New York City, US
- Died: 23 May 1999 (aged 90); Atlantic Beach, Florida, US
- Burial place: Arlington National Cemetery
- Military career
- Allegiance: United States
- Branch: United States Navy
- Service years: 1930–1968, 1970–1971
- Rank: Vice Admiral
- Nickname: Chick
- Service number: 0-63431/1310
- Commands: 14th Naval District; Naval War College; USS Franklin D. Roosevelt; Naval Ordnance Laboratory; USS Point Cruz; VC-5; VB-106
- Conflicts: World War II: Guadalcanal Campaign; Solomon Islands campaign; New Guinea Campaign; Occupation of Japan
- Awards: Navy Distinguished Service Medal (2); Silver Star; Legion of Merit (3); Distinguished Flying Cross (3); Air Medal

John Tucker "Chick" Hayward (15 November 1908 – 23 May 1999) was an American naval aviator during World War II. He helped develop one of the two atomic bombs that was dropped on Japan in the closing days of the war. Later, he was a pioneer in the development of nuclear propulsion, nuclear weapons, guidance systems for ground- and air-launched rockets, and underwater anti-submarine weapons. A former batboy for the New York Yankees, Hayward dropped out of high school and lied about his age to enlist in the United States Navy at age 16. He was subsequently admitted to the United States Naval Academy at Annapolis, from which he graduated 51st in his class of 1930. He volunteered for naval aviation.

During World War II, he served at the Naval Aircraft Factory in Philadelphia, where he was involved in an effort to improve aircraft instrumentation, notably the compass and altimeter. He attended the University of Pennsylvania's Moore School of Electrical Engineering, and studied nuclear physics. In June 1942, he assumed command of a new patrol bomber squadron, VB-106, equipped with PB4Y-1 Liberators, which he led in a daring raid on Wake Island, in the Solomon Islands campaign, and in the Southwest Pacific Area. Returning to the United States in 1944, he was posted to the Naval Ordnance Test Station at Inyokern, California, where he joined the Manhattan Project, participating in Project Camel, the development of the non-nuclear components of the Fat Man bomb, and in its drop testing.

After the war ended, he travelled to Hiroshima and Nagasaki as part of the team investigating the bomb damage, and during Operation Crossroads, he led the effort to photograph the nuclear explosion at the Bikini Atoll. In 1949, he assumed command of VC-5, the first naval nuclear bomber squadron. In March 1949, he took off from the carrier USS Coral Sea in the Atlantic in a Lockheed P2V Neptune bomber carrying a dummy Little Boy pumpkin bomb, flew across the United States to make a simulated attack on a test site in California., and flew back to Patuxent River, where he landed after a total of 23 hours flying. In August 1950, he was at the controls of the first carrier landing and takeoff of an AJ-1 Savage heavy attack bomber.

From June 1951 to May 1953, Hayward was head of the Military Applications Division of the Atomic Energy Commission, where he conducted atomic weapons laboratory work at Los Alamos National Laboratory. In June 1953, he assumed command of the escort carrier USS Point Cruz, and was involved in the rescue of a baby who was found abandoned in the trash at a U.S. Army depot. In June 1954, he became the first naval aviator to command the Naval Ordnance Laboratory, where he was involved with the development of the Mark 52 naval mine and the Mark 90 nuclear bomb, a nuclear depth charge. He was Assistant Chief of Naval Operations for Research and Development, and then Deputy Chief of Naval Operations for Development. In 1962 he assumed command of a carrier task force which included the nuclear-powered aircraft carrier USS Enterprise. He commanded the Antisubmarine Warfare Force, Pacific Fleet, from 1963 to 1966, and then was president of the Naval War College from 1966 until 1968.

== Early life ==
Hayward was born in New York City on 15 November 1908 one of eight children of Charles Brian and Rosa Hayward (née Valdetaro) As a youngster, he was a batboy for the New York Yankees. In May 1925, he dropped out of high school at Loyola School and enlisted in the United States Navy by lying about his age, which at the time he believed to be only 15, and forging his father's signature on the papers. He soon acquired the nickname "Chick" from a bosun who asked "And how in did a little chick like you get in here amongst all these grown men?" The nickname would remain with him for the rest of his naval career.

Hayward did his initial naval training at the Naval Station Newport at Newport, Rhode Island. He was encouraged by the Chaplain, Father John J. Brady, to try for admission to United States Naval Academy at Annapolis. Brady arranged for Hayward to be sent to the Naval Academy Preparatory School in Norfolk, Virginia, to study for the entrance exams. During World War I, some one-hundred presidential appointments to Annapolis had been set aside for enlisted sailors, but few had applied, and fewer still had passed the entrance exams. Of the 119 sailors who sat the exams in 1926, only 19 passed, one of whom was Hayward. He entered Annapolis in August 1926, and was commissioned as an ensign on graduation in June 1930, ranking 51st in his class of 406.

After graduation, Hayward volunteered for naval aviation, and learned to fly in a Consolidated NY seaplane at Naval Air Station Hampton Roads. A tour of sea duty on the cruiser USS Richmond followed, after which he was posted to the Naval Air Station Pensacola to complete his flight training. He received his aviator's wings in July 1932. While there he met a local woman, Leila Marion (Lili) Hyer, and the two were married at St John's Church in Warrington, Florida, on 15 October 1932. Their marriage would produce five children.

Hayward was posted to a scout bombing squadron, VS-1B, flying Vought SBU Corsairs, on the aircraft carrier USS Langley on the West Coast, and was soon promoted to the rank of lieutenant (junior grade), but owing to government austerity measures, was not paid as such. In 1935, the squadron was transferred to the USS Saratoga. Coming in for a landing, a fuel line on his aircraft broke, spraying him with fuel and damaging his left eye. After he recovered, and his flight status was restored, he was sent to VP-2, which was stationed in the Panama Canal Zone, flying Martin PM patrol aircraft. Following a two-year tour there, he was assigned to the SON Seagull detachment aboard the newly commissioned cruiser USS Philadelphia, where he was promoted to lieutenant on 30 June 1937. He then repeated the procedure of commissioning the aircraft detachment of a new cruiser on another ship of the same class, the USS Phoenix in 1938.

== World War II ==
=== Pacific Theater ===
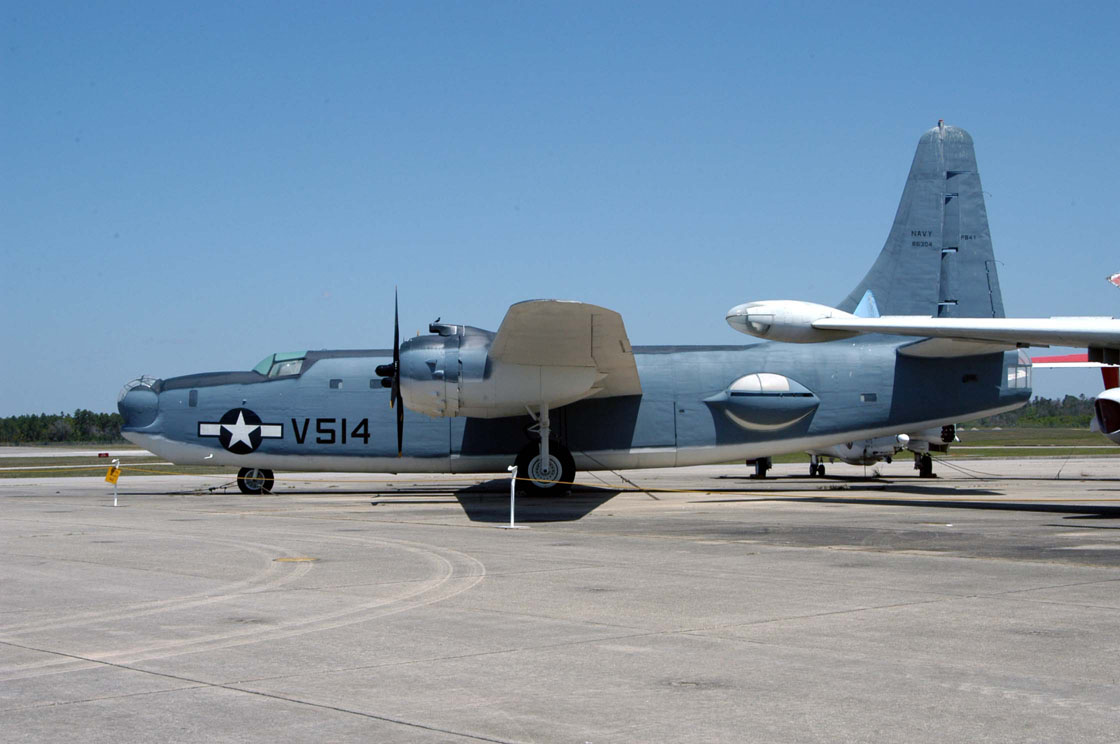
A Navy PB4Y bomber

Hayward was posted to the Naval Aircraft Factory in Philadelphia in June 1940, where he continued graduate studies at Temple University that he had begun in 1937, and then attended the University of Pennsylvania's Moore School of Electrical Engineering, where he studied nuclear physics. At the Naval Aircraft Factory, he was involved in an effort to improve aircraft instrumentation, notably the compass and altimeter. He was promoted to lieutenant commander in January 1942.

In June 1942, Hayward assumed command of a new patrol bomber squadron, VB-106, equipped with PB4Y-1 Liberators. He was promoted to commander in August 1942. VB-106 trained in Hawaii, and flew its first combat mission against Wake Island in October 1943. For this mission, he was awarded the Distinguished Flying Cross. His citation read:

For extraordinary achievement while participating in aerial flight as Squadron Commander of a Heavy Bombing Squadron during the attack by U.S. Naval Forces against Wake Island on 5 October 1943. He led the attack by his squadron and personally directed the operations against enemy objectives during which time he successfully and effectively bombed, strafed enemy installations, and obtained many valuable photographs of the island in the face of intense anti-aircraft fire. His aggressive and skillful leadership and constant devotion to duty contributed directly to the success of this action against the enemy and were in keeping with the highest traditions of the United States Naval Service.

Hayward was awarded a second Distinguished Flying Cross on the recommendation of Captain Arleigh Burke for leading his squadron in the South Pacific Area. His citation read:

For extraordinary achievement while participating in aerial flight against the enemy as commanding officer of a navy bombing squadron operating in the South Pacific area from 8 November 1943 to 24 February 1944. During this period, Commander Hayward completed many combat and search missions over Japanese territory, frequently encountering heavy anti-aircraft fire. Several of the missions were made, despite adverse weather conditions. On 8 November while on a routine search, he bombed Kapingimarangi Island, scoring four direct hits on an enemy bivouac area. On 20 and 31 December and 8 January he bombed, strafed and sank enemy supply barges on each occasion. On 24 February, his efficient spotting enabled our destroyers to destroy three Japanese cargo vessels in Kavieng Harbor. His superior airmanship and outstanding leadership contributed materially to the success of the squadron in inflicting severe damage on the Japanese forces in the area. His courageous conduct was in keeping with the highest traditions of the United States Naval Service.

In March 1944, VB-106 was transferred to Nadzab in the Southwest Pacific Area, where it came under the command of the Fifth Air Force. It thus served in three different theaters in the Pacific. Hayward was awarded a third Distinguished Flying Cross:

For extraordinary achievement while participating in aerial flight from 13 April 1944 to 23 April 1944. Captain Hayward completed twenty flights in a combat area where enemy anti-aircraft fire was expected to be effective or where enemy aircraft patrols usually occurred.

He was also awarded the Legion of Merit with the valor device:

for exceptionally meritorious conduct in the performance of outstanding services to the Government of the United States as commanding officer of Bombing Squadron One Hundred Six (VB-106), in connection with operations against enemy Japanese forces in the Pacific Ocean Area from 25 March to 1 June 1944. During this period, Captain Hayward successfully carried out three hundred and five long-range search operations, armed reconnaissance and offensive strikes against the enemy. His competent leadership, professional skill and initiative were contributing factors in the success of his squadron in sinking twelve enemy cargo vessels and thirteen barges; and in shooting down twelve aircraft and damaging three in aerial combat. Captain Hayward's aggressiveness and unwavering devotion to duty were in keeping with the highest traditions of the United States Naval Service.

Somewhat depleted in both aircraft and aircrews, VB-106 handed over its three PB4Ys with the least hours on the clock to its relief, VB-115, on 27 May 1944, and returned to the United States.

=== Manhattan Project ===
Hayward's next posting was to the Naval Ordnance Test Station at Inyokern, California. Initially he was involved with test firing rockets from various aircraft, including the Grumman F6F Hellcat and the twin engine Grumman F7F Tigercat. Once his security clearance was complete, he was assigned to the Manhattan Project. He participated in Project Camel, the development of the non-nuclear components of the Fat Man bomb, and in its drop testing. This involved flying the four engine Boeing B-29 Superfortress. After the war ended, he travelled to Hiroshima and Nagasaki as part of the Manhattan Project team investigating the bomb damage. He was promoted to captain on 10 December 1945. During Operation Crossroads, he led the effort to photograph the nuclear explosion at the Bikini Atoll.

== Post war ==
=== Nuclear weapons ===
After a series of clashes with his superior at Inyokern, Captain James B. Sykes, Hayward left to become the Director for Plans and Operations for Armed Forces Special Weapons Project, Sandia National Laboratories on 1 August 1947. On 1 January 1948, he was reduced in rank to commander again. The Air Force offered a commission as a brigadier general, and Convair offered a job working on the SM-65 Atlas missile, but Hayward elected to stay in the navy. He participated in the Operation Sandstone nuclear tests in the Pacific in April 1948.

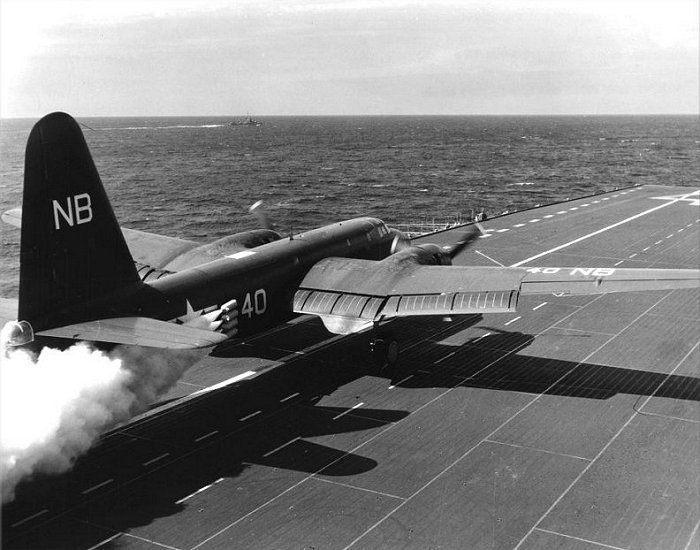
A P2V takes off from USS Midway using JATO on 21 April 1950

After World War II, the US Navy sought to acquire a nuclear strike capability, and the Deputy Chief of Naval Operations for Air, Rear Admiral Arthur W. Radford wanted them to operate from aircraft carriers. There were practical problems with this. Nuclear weapons at that time were bulky and required a large aircraft to carry them. After Operation Crossroads, Radford asked Hayward if the Navy had such an aircraft, and Hayward suggested modifying the Lockheed P2V Neptune for carrier operations using jet-assisted takeoff (JATO) rocket boosters. It was an interim solution, as it a could not carry a Fat Man, but only the smaller Little Boy bomb; it could only be operated by the large Midway class aircraft carriers, which still had to be modified for the task; and initially had no tailhook, so it was unable to land on a carrier, and a mission would have to end with it either landing at a land base or ditching at sea.

On 28 April 1948, two P2Vs were launched from a carrier, the USS Coral Sea, for the first time. The intention was that each of the three Midway-class carriers would have a nuclear attack squadron. The first of these, Composite (Heavy Attack) Squadron 5 (VC-5) was formed at Moffett Field, California, on 9 September 1948, with Commander Frederick L. "Dick" Ashworth, who had been weaponeer on the Nagasaki raid, as its acting commander. However, Rear Admiral Deak Parsons felt that Ashworth did not have sufficient flight time for the role, so it was decided that Hayward would command VC-5. He assumed command on 3 January 1949, with Ashworth as his executive officer. Hayward intended that Ashworth would take command of the next squadron, VC-6, when it was formed.

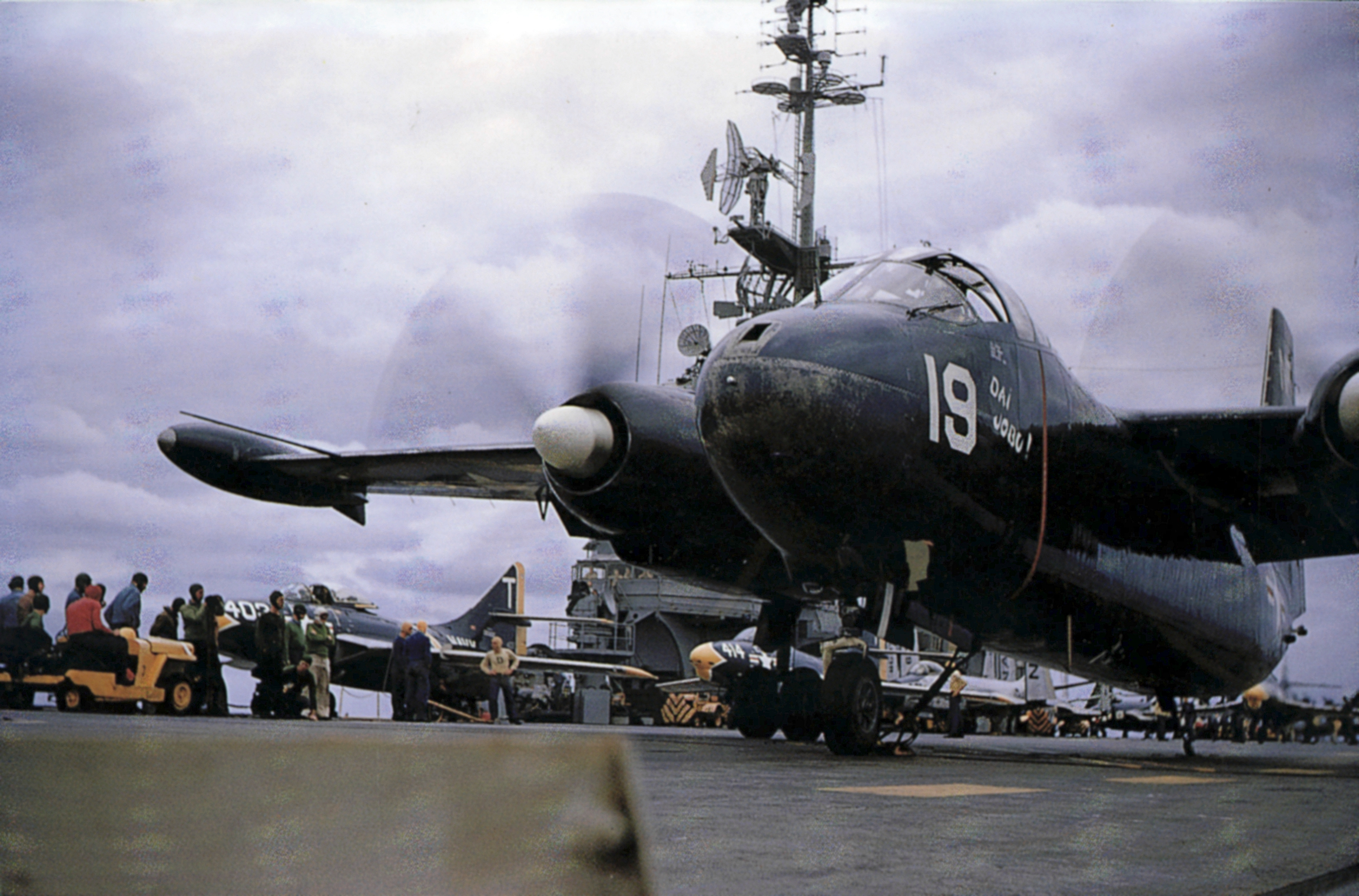
A nuclear capable AJ Savage launches from the aircraft carrier USS Midway in 1955

Hayward was promoted to captain again on 19 February 1949. On 7 March, he took off Coral Sea in the Atlantic in a P2V carrying a dummy Little Boy pumpkin bomb, and flew across the United States to make a simulated attack on the Salton Sea test site near El Centro, California. He then flew to Patuxent River, where he landed after a total of 23 hours flying. Hayward had tailhooks fitted to a pair of P2Vs, and made practice landings on a carrier deck painted on the ground at NAS Patuxent River, Maryland, He made some touch and go passes at the USS Franklin D. Roosevelt, but a carrier landing was considered too dangerous for regular crews to attempt.

The P2Vs would be first augmented, and then replaced, by the more capable North American AJ Savage as they became available. These could take off and land on a carrier, carrying a Fat Man. On 21 August 1950, Hayward was at the controls of the first carrier landing and takeoff of an AJ-1 Savage heavy attack bomber, on the Coral Sea with the commander of Naval Air Forces Atlantic Fleet (COMAIRLANT), Vice Admiral Felix Stump, in the back seat. However, by mid-December VC-5 still only had six AJ-1s.

From June 1951 to May 1953, Hayward was head of the Military Applications Division of the Atomic Energy Commission, where he conducted atomic weapons laboratory work at Los Alamos National Laboratory. He also worked on the foundation of the Lawrence Livermore National Laboratory program in 1952 in close collaboration with Edward Teller. The culmination of this was working on the Ivy Mike nuclear test.

=== Point Cruz ===
In June 1953, Hayward took command of the escort carrier USS Point Cruz. He confessed to the crew that he did not know what he was doing, and urged any crewman who felt he was doing something wrong to tell him so at once. At the end of the Korean War, the carrier was deployed at Inchon, where a baby was found abandoned in the trash at a U.S. Army depot. The baby was brought to an orphanage, and Hayward sent Point Cruz's chaplain in response to a request for assistance. The nun running the orphanage felt the blue-eyed baby would not be safe if he remained in Korea. Hayward is said to have told the chaplain: "You are not to return to this vessel until you have procured that baby."

Hayward is credited with putting his naval career "on the line" by bringing the baby on the ship, which was against regulations, and he subsequently received orders to get the baby off the ship. However, having a baby on board boosted sailors' morale, and Hayward later said that a leader must "know when to intelligently disregard regulations." A visa was obtained by intervention of Richard Nixon's staffers, and a passport was secured by winning a poker game against the South Korean who issued passports. The baby, adopted by Navy surgeon Hugh Keenan, who was also in port at Inchon, was later named Daniel, and was transferred to a civilian ship in Japan. Daniel Keenan was raised in Seattle and began attending reunions of the crew of the Point Cruz in 1993. The story of Daniel Keenan was made into a television movie, A Thousand Men and a Baby, which aired on CBS in 1997.

=== Later career ===
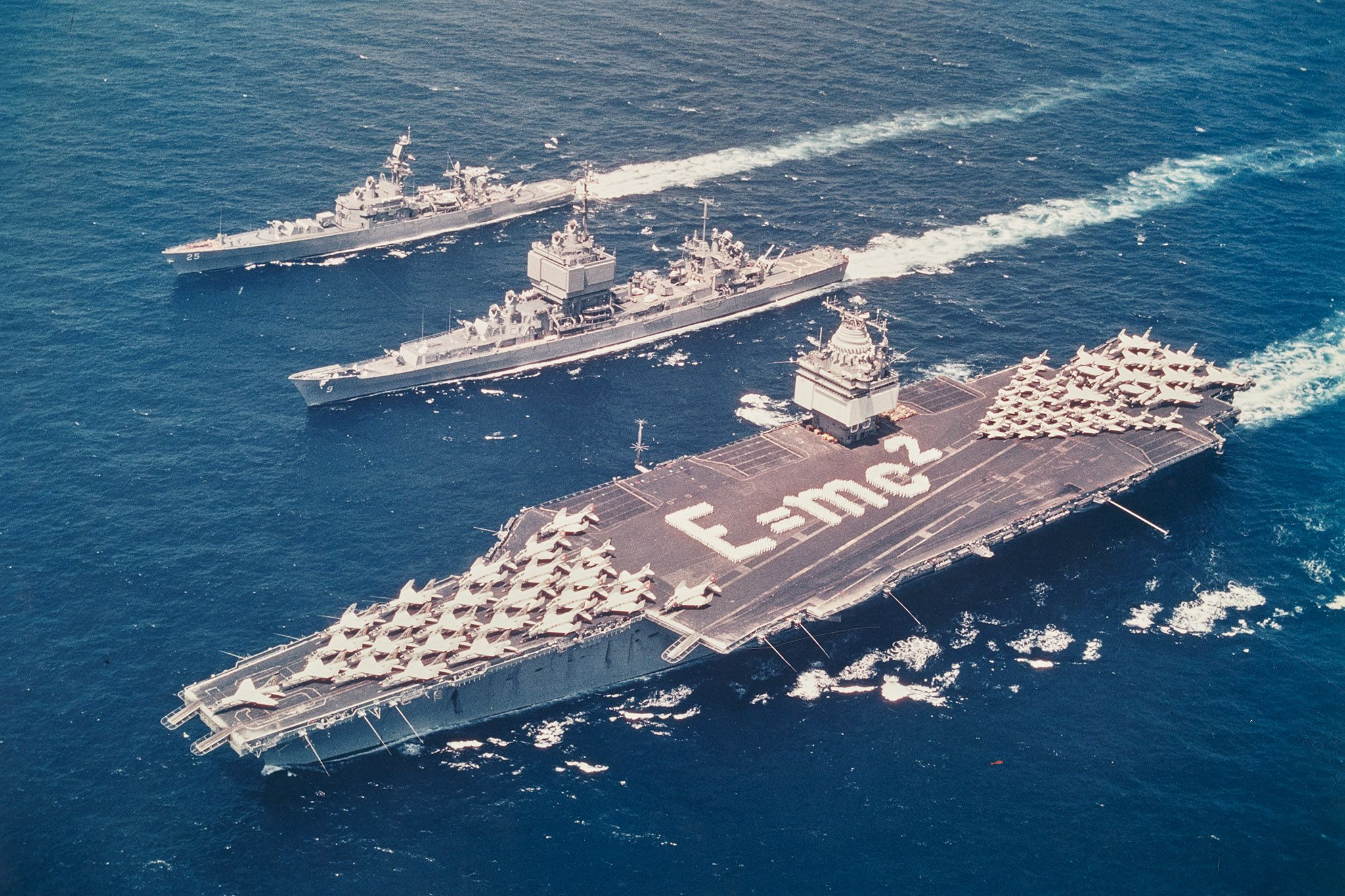
USS Enterprise, Long Beach and Bainbridge in 1964

Hayward assumed command of the Naval Ordnance Laboratory at White Oak, Maryland, in June 1954. He was the first naval aviator to do so, all the previous commanders having been naval ordnance officers. Under his guidance, the Naval Ordnance Laboratory developed the Mark 52 naval mine, an air-delivered weapon with acoustic, magnetic and pressure sensors. Hayward encountered some resistance with this project, as mine warfare was a neglected field in the Navy. The Naval Ordnance Laboratory also developed the Mark 90 nuclear bomb, a nuclear depth charge, which was tested during Operation Wigwam in May 1955.

From a naval career point of view, Hayward's most notable drawback was his lack of time in command of a ship at sea. Admiral Arleigh Burke, now Chief of naval Operations, arranged for Hayward to be given command of the aircraft carrier Franklin D. Roosevelt in February 1956. This would normally be the climax of naval aviator's career, but that year he was selected for promotion to rear admiral. His record of 13,200 flight hours was the highest ever achieved by a flag officer. On 7 January 1957, he was assigned to the office of the Assistant Chief of Naval Operations for Plans and Operations. In October, he became Assistant Chief of Naval Operations for Research and Development. The very public failure of Project Vanguard resulted in Hayward being called to appear before a Congressional Committee, where he was grilled by its chairman, Senator Lyndon B. Johnson. The post was upgraded to Deputy Chief of Naval Operations for Development in 1959, and he was promoted to vice admiral. He pushed the development of a number of new weapons systems, including the Lockheed P-3 Orion and the nuclear-powered aircraft carrier USS Enterprise. Between 1959 and 1961, Defense expenditure on research and development grew from $525 million (roughly equivalent to $5.8 billion in 2026) to $4 billion (roughly equivalent to $43.1 billion in 2026).

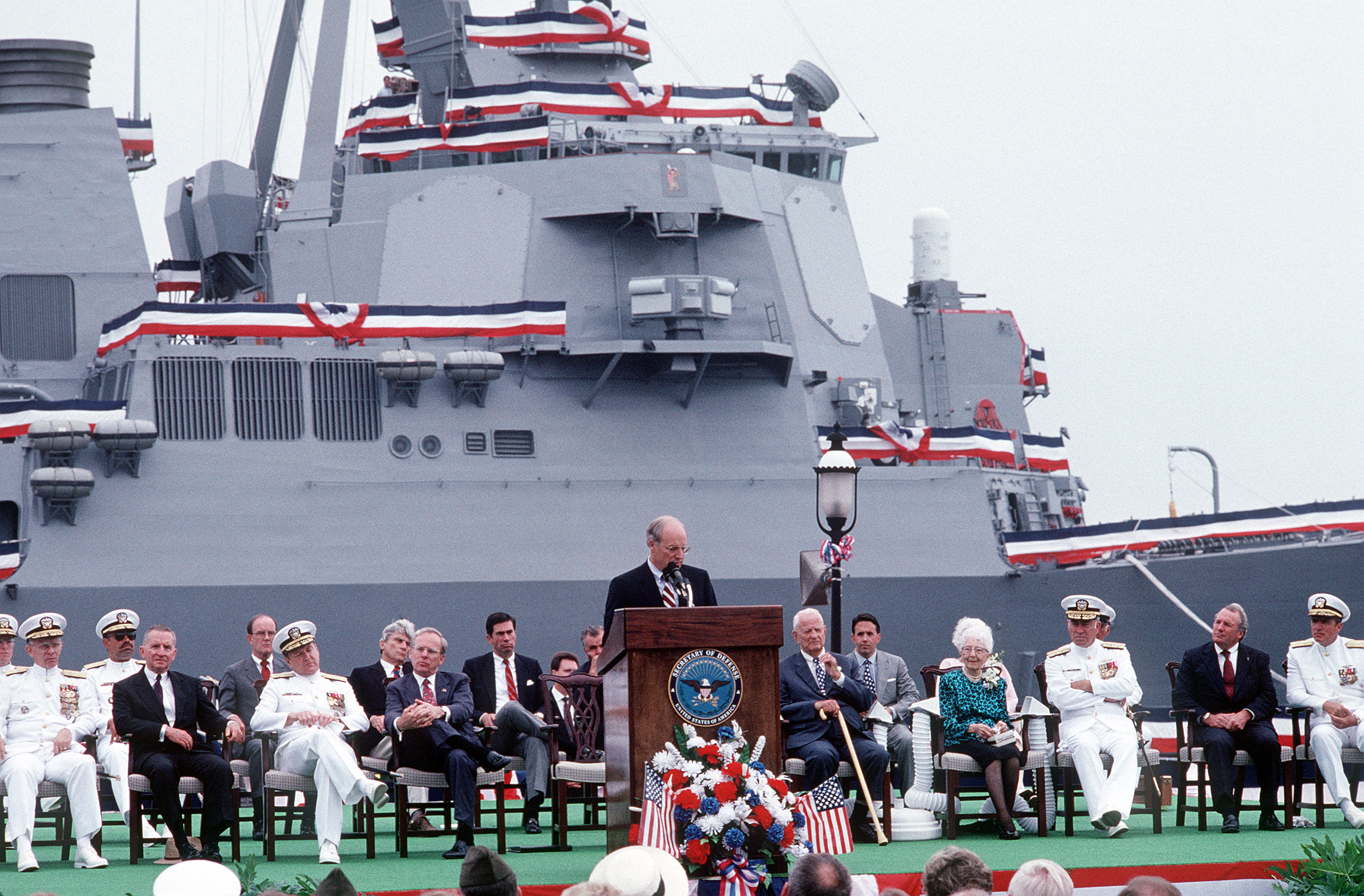
Hayward (left) and other dignitaries including Secretary of Defense Dick Cheney (at podium), and Admiral Arleigh Burke (third from right) attend the commissioning ceremony for the destroyer USS Arleigh Burke in 1991

In 1962, President John F. Kennedy offered Hayward four stars and the job of Deputy Director of the Central Intelligence Agency. Hayward turned it down, accepting a demotion to rear admiral on 9 March 1962 to take command of Carrier Division 2, which included the nuclear-powered Enterprise, Long Beach, Bainbridge and Truxtun. In October 1962, his ships participated in the Cuban Missile Crisis. In June 1963, he was restored to the rank of vice admiral, which was backdated to 25 April 1959, the day he had first been promoted. He commanded the Antisubmarine Warfare Force, Pacific Fleet, from 13 June 1963 to 12 January 1966, for which he was awarded the Navy Distinguished Service Medal for his "leadership, judgment and foresight in research and development associated with antisubmarine warfare and the training of Antisubmarine Warfare Groups during his tenure of command."

Hayward was president of the Naval War College in Newport, Rhode Island, from 1966 until 1968. He strove to transform the Naval War College into the Navy's premier postgraduate school, one from which graduation would fit officers for, and mark them out as future flag officers. Heading a captain's selection board in May 1967, he disapproved of two officers with spotless records. "You mean they never argued, never had a difference of opinion?" he remarked. "What kind of man is that?"

Hayward was awarded a second Navy Distinguished Service Medal for his service as president of Naval War College. He retired in 1968, but returned to serve to duty as a rear admiral from November 1970 to December 1971 as commander, 14th Naval District, Commander Fleet Air Hawaii and Commander, Naval Base Pearl Harbor. His responsibilities included "the planning, training and execution of highly successful recoveries of Apollo spacecraft in the Mid-Pacific", for which he was awarded a third Legion of Merit.

== Later life ==
After retiring from the Navy, Hayward worked for General Dynamics as a vice president for international programs until 1973, and then as a consultant until 1979. He then worked with the Draper Laboratory and the Hertz Foundation. He became an American Institute of Aeronautics and Astronautics Fellow in 1998, and was inducted into the Naval Aviation Hall of Honor in 2004.

Hayward joined a team of scientists that was sent to investigate the origins of the Shroud of Turin in Vatican City. While speaking at the Naval War College in 1982, Hayward said that the evidence collected during the investigation convinced him that the shroud was in fact used to bury Jesus Christ. However, he spoke only for himself and not the entire team. According to the rest of the team, the image on the shroud was rather formed by a combination of heat and light. Hayward decided that further research into the age of the shroud via Carbon-14 dating was needed but Church authorities would not permit this to happen at the time.

Hayward died of cancer on 23 May 1999 in Atlantic Beach, Florida, and was buried in Arlington National Cemetery. His papers are in the Naval History & Heritage Command at the Washington Navy Yard.

== Notes ==
Military offices
Preceded by Charles L. Melson	President of the Naval War College; 15 February 1966–30 August 1968	Succeeded by Richard G. Colbert
