= 5-Inch Forward Firing Aircraft Rocket =

Five-inch forward-firing aircraft rocket
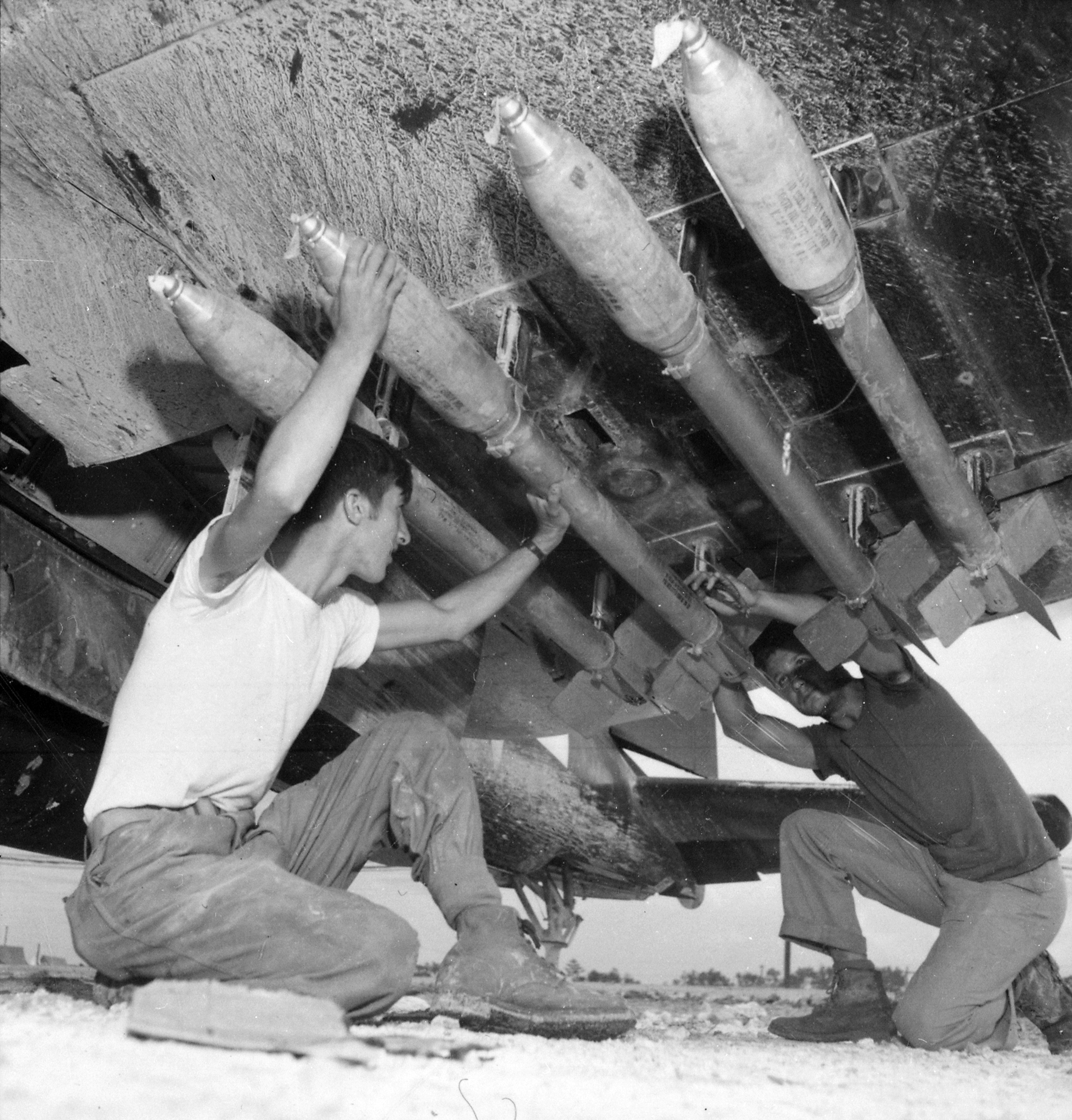
- FFARs being loaded
- Type: Air-to-surface rocket
- Place of origin: United States

Service history
- Used by: United States military

Production history
- Produced: 1943-1945

Specifications (5-inch FFAR)
- Mass: 80 pounds (36 kg)
- Length: 5 feet 5 inches (1.65 m)
- Diameter: Warhead: 5 inches (127 mm); Motor: 3.5 inches (89 mm)
- Warhead: High explosive
- Warhead weight: 45 pounds (20 kg)
- Engine: Solid-fuel rocket
- Operational range: 1 mile (1.6 km)
- Maximum speed: 485 miles per hour (781 km/h)
- Guidance system: None

The five-inch forward-firing aircraft rocket or FFAR was an American rocket developed during World War II for attack from airplanes against ground and ship targets.

== Operational history ==
The first FFARs were developed by the U.S. Navy and introduced in June 1943. They had a 3.5-inch diameter and a non-explosive warhead, since they were used as an aircraft-launched anti-submarine warfare (ASW) rocket and worked by puncturing the hull. It was accurate enough for use against surface ships and land targets, but these missions required an explosive warhead. A five-inch anti-aircraft shell was attached to the 3.5-inch rocket motor, creating the five-inch FFAR, which entered service in December 1943. Performance was limited because of the increased weight, limiting speed to 780 km/h (485 mph). The high-velocity aircraft rocket, or HVAR, was developed to fix this flaw.

The FFAR was used by the Douglas SBD Dauntless (dive bomber), the Grumman TBF Avenger (torpedo bomber) and the Vought F4U Corsair (carrier based fighter).

== See also ==
- 2.75 inch FFAR
- 3.5-Inch Forward Firing Aircraft Rocket
- List of rockets
- RP-3
- Zuni rocket
