= 3.5-Inch Forward Firing Aircraft Rocket =

3.5-inch forward firing aircraft rocket, 3.5" FFAR
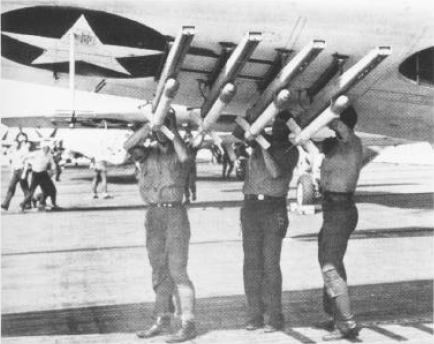
- 3.5-inch FFARs being mounted underwing on a Grumman TBF Avenger
- Type: Anti-submarine rocket
- Place of origin: US

Service history
- Used by: United States Navy

Production history
- Produced: 1943–1944

Specifications (3.5-inch FFAR)
- Mass: 54 pounds (24 kg)
- Length: 4 feet 7 inches (1.40 m) total = 45 inches (1,100 mm) motor length + 10 inches (250 mm) steel warhead length
- Diameter: Motor 3.25 inches (83 mm), solid steel warhead 3.5 inches (89 mm)
- Warhead: None
- Engine: Caltech solid-fuel rocket 2,300 lb_{f} (10.4 kN)
- Operational range: 1,500 yards (1,400 m) nominal firing range
- Maximum speed: 1,045 miles per hour (1,682 km/h) = 1,180 feet per second (360 m/s) rocket delta V plus + 240 miles per hour (390 km/h) approx. aircraft speed
- Guidance system: None

The 3.5-inch Forward Firing Aircraft Rocket, or 3.5-Inch FFAR, was an American rocket developed during World War II to allow aircraft to attack enemy submarines at range. The rocket proved an operational success, and spawned several improved versions for use against surface and land targets.

== Design and development ==
Following trials by the Royal Air Force of rocket-propelled, air-launched weapons for anti-submarine warfare during 1942 (which resulted in the adoption of the RP-3 by RAF Coastal Command), the United States Navy launched a high-priority project during the summer of 1943 for the development of an anti-submarine rocket of its own.

The resulting rocket was a simple design with four tail fins for stabilization at the rear, powered by a rocket motor that had been under development by Caltech since 1943. The warhead contained no explosive. The rocket's nose was a solid steel mass, weighing 20 pounds (9.1 kg), that punctured the pressure hull of a target submarine through the kinetic energy and momentum from its high velocity and mass. The nose of the 3.5" FFAR was given a relatively blunt conical shape that had been shown experimentally to give a maximum pitch-up as the rocket entered the water. This caused the rocket to shoot forward at a shallow depth deadly to submarines that were surfaced or traveling at snorkel or periscope depth. The rockets were launched in a shallow dive, since entry into the water at too steep an angle would defeat their ability to shoot forward at the required shallow depth. The rocket remained lethal even after passing through up to 130 feet (40 m) of water, giving the pilot a target several times the actual size of the submarine. The sweet spot for targeting was considered to be 60 feet (18 m) in front of the near side of the submarine. Typical firing range was about 1,500 yards (1,400 m).

== Operational history ==
Following expedited development, the weapon, officially designated the "3.5-inch forward firing aircraft rocket", entered operational service with the U.S. Navy late in 1943; production of 10,000 rockets per month had been ordered that August. The FFAR's first "kill" of an enemy submarine took place 11 January 1944. The rocket was originally carried by the Grumman TBF Avenger torpedo bombers. Excessive drag caused by the original 92-inch-long (230 cm) channel-slide launchers was largely eliminated with the introduction of zero-length launchers in May 1945. Zero-length launchers quickly became standard on most fighters and many light bombers for firing a variety of rockets with 3.25" or 5" diameter rocket motors.

Although the rocket's accuracy was more than sufficient to allow usage against surface targets, the narrow body diameter restricted the size of any explosive warhead that could be fitted. Therefore, for use against ships and land targets, the rocket was given a warhead consisting of a 45 lb (20 kg) re-fused 5" (127 mm) Mark 35 artillery shell, producing the 5-inch forward firing aircraft rocket, usually shortened to 5" AR.

== See also ==
- High velocity aircraft rocket
- Zuni rocket
- List of rockets
