= Japanese destroyer Yūdachi =

Four Japanese destroyers have been named Yūdachi (夕立 / ゆうだち, "evening shower"):

- Japanese destroyer Yūdachi (1906), a Kamikaze-class destroyer (1905) of the Imperial Japanese Navy during World War I
- Japanese destroyer Yūdachi (1936), a Shiratsuyu-class destroyer of the Imperial Japanese Navy during World War II
- JDS Yūdachi (DD-108), a Murasame-class destroyer (1958) of the Japanese Maritime Self-Defense Force in 1958
- JS Yūdachi (DD-103), a Murasame-class destroyer (1994) that entered into service of the Japanese Maritime Self-Defense Force in 1999
