= JDS Murasame (DD-107) =

Murasame-class destroyer

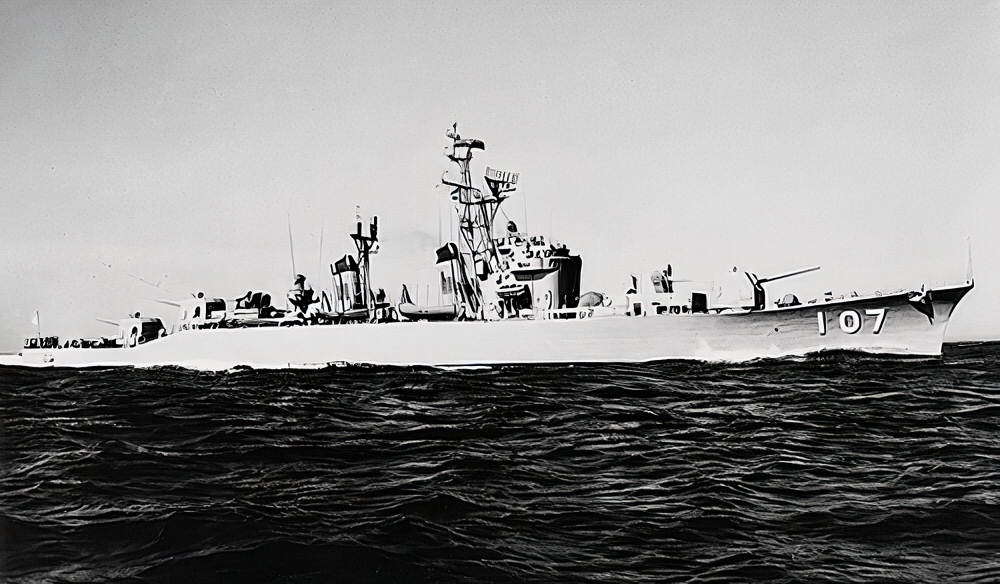
- JDS Murasame

History

Japan
- Name: Murasame; (むらさめ)
- Namesake: Murasame (1935)
- Ordered: 1958
- Builder: Mitsubishi Heavy Industries
- Laid down: 17 December 1957
- Launched: 31 July 1958
- Commissioned: 28 February 1959
- Decommissioned: 23 March 1988
- Home port: Maizuru
- Identification: DD-107; ASU-7006
- Fate: Scrapped

General characteristics
- Class & type: Murasame-class destroyer
- Displacement: 1,800 long tons (1,829 t) standard
- Length: 108.0 m (354 ft 4 in)
- Beam: 11.0 m (36 ft 1 in)
- Propulsion: 2 × Steam turbines (15,000ps); 2 × shafts
- Speed: 30 knots (56 km/h; 35 mph)
- Complement: 220
- Armament: 3 × 5-inch/54 caliber Mk.16 guns; 4 × 3-inch/50 caliber Mk.22 guns; 2 × ASW torpedo racks; 1 × Hedgehog anti-submarine mortar; 2 × Y-gun depth charge throwers; 1 × Depth charge rack

JDS Murasame (DD-107) was the lead ship of the Murasame-class destroyer of Japan Maritime Self-Defense Force.

== Construction and career ==
Murasame was laid down by Mitsubishi at Kobe in Japan on 17 December 1957, launched on 31 July 1958 and commissioned with the pennant number DD-107 on 28 February 1959. She was incorporated into the Maizuru District Force.

On March 25, 1959, it was incorporated into the 10th Escort Corps, which was newly commissioned by the Maizuru District Force, along with JDS Yūdachi, who was commissioned on the same day.

On September 25, 1959, the 10th Escort Corps was reorganized under the 1st Escort Corps group.

On February 1, 1961, the 10th Escort Corps was reorganized into the 2nd Escort Group under the Self-Defense Fleet.

Participated in practicing ocean voyages in 1965 and 1967.

In September 1969, the sonar was replaced with SQS-4.

On March 15, 1969, the 10th Escort Corps was reorganized under the 3rd Escort Corps group.

In September 1975, the short torpedo launcher was removed and equipped with a 68-type triple short torpedo launcher.

On March 30, 1984, the 10th Escort Corps was abolished, the type was changed to a special service ship, and the ship registration number was changed to (ASU-7006). Transferred to Yokosuka as a ship under the direct control of the Development Guidance Group.

In 1987, mounted a new minesweeper under development by the Technical Research and Development Institute on the rear deck and engaged in practical tests.

She was decommissioned on March 23, 1988. The total itinerary is about 635,000 nautical miles (about 30 laps of the earth).

== Gallery ==
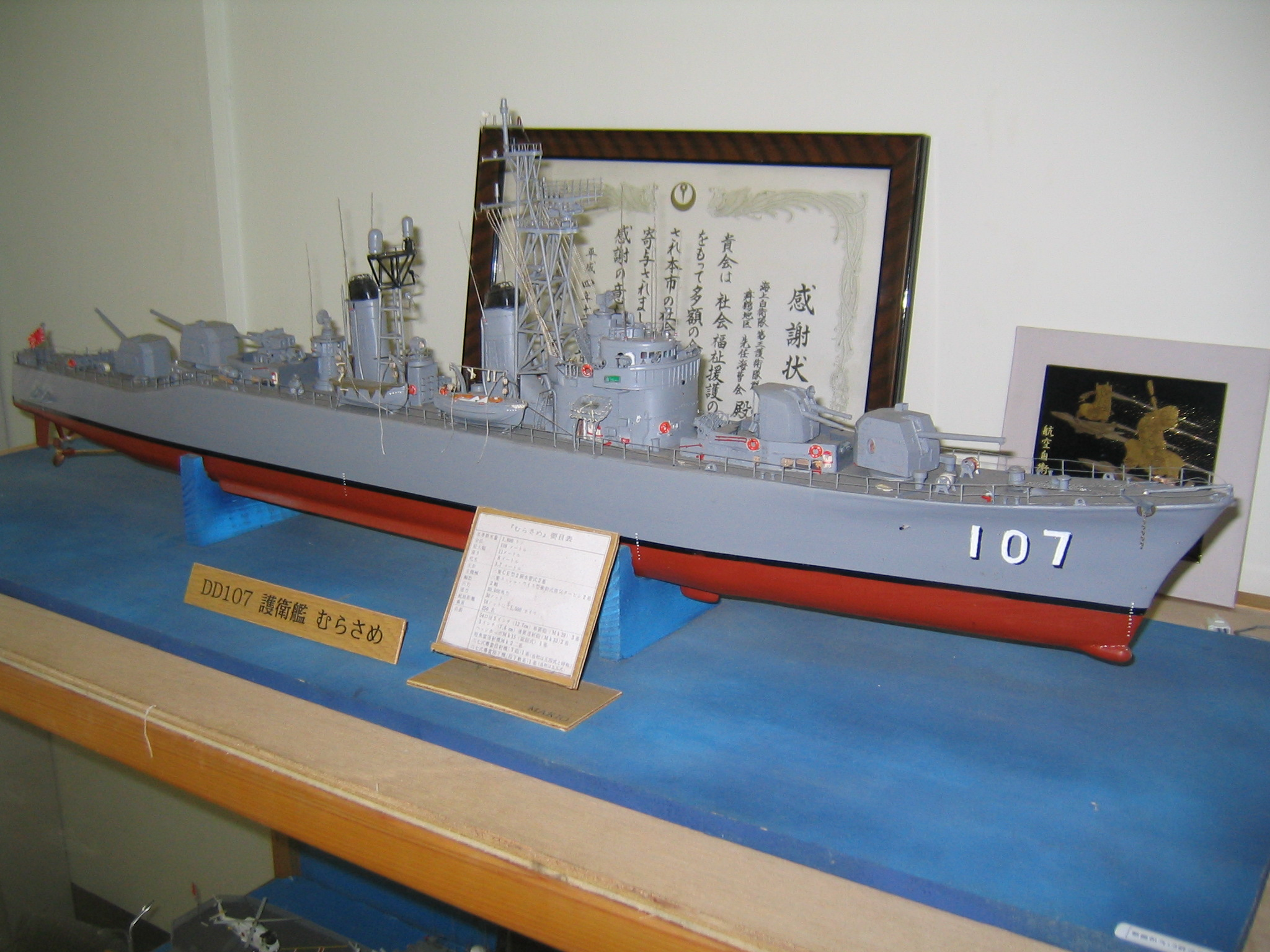
A model of JDS Murasame at Maizuru Naval Base on 24 April 2010.
