= CL-154-class cruiser =

US Navy light cruisers

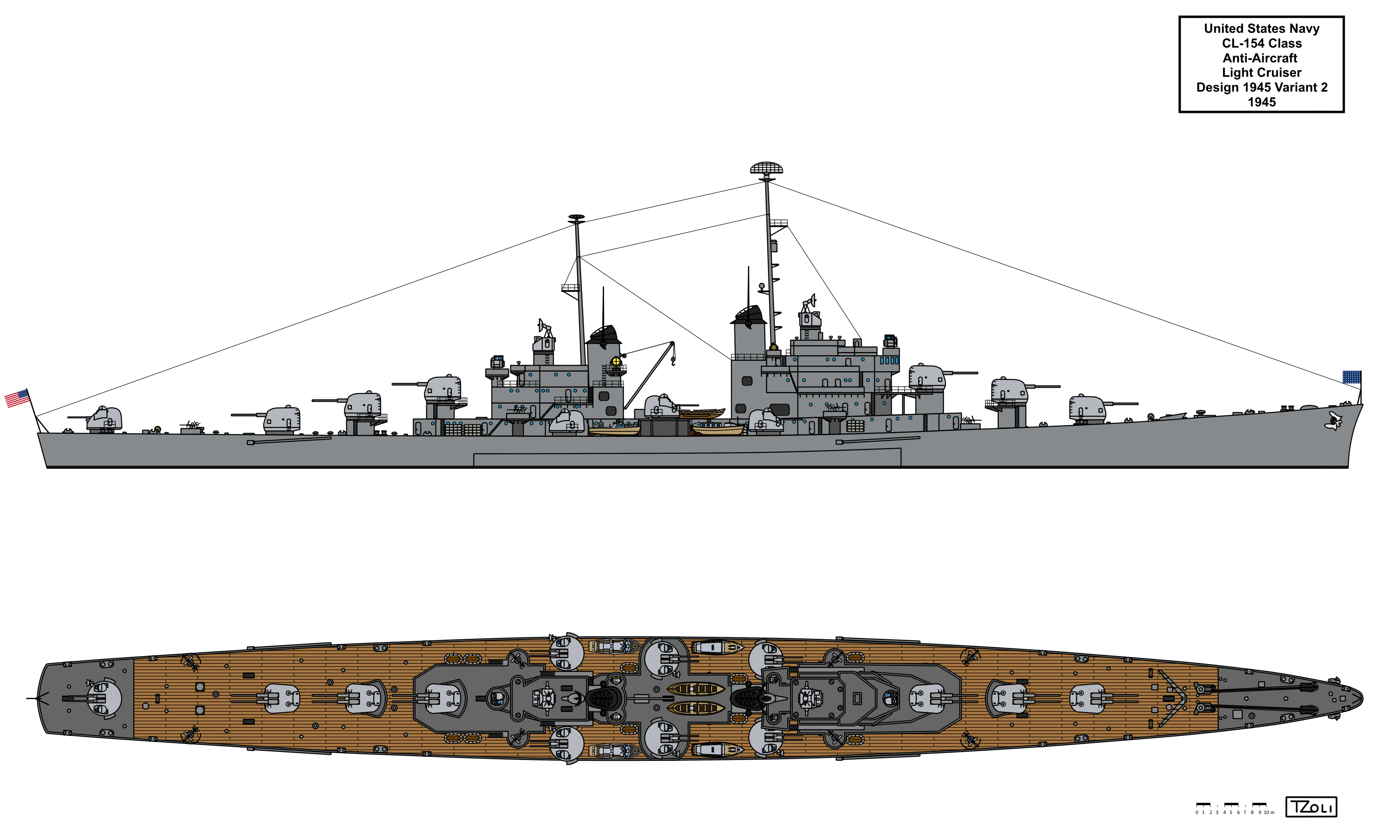
- CL-154 class concept September 1945 - approximation

Class overview
- Name: CL-154 class
- Operators: United States Navy
- Preceded by: Juneau class
- Succeeded by: None
- Planned: 6
- Completed: 0

General characteristics September 1945
- Class & type: Light cruiser
- Displacement: 11,950 tons (full load)
- Length: 610 ft 0 in (185.9 m)
- Propulsion: 2 geared steam turbines; 110,000 hp (82,000 kW)
- Speed: 34.5 knots (63.9 km/h; 39.7 mph)
- Armament: 6 or 8 × dual 5-inch/54-caliber Mark 16 guns; 6 or 8 × dual 3"/70 Mark 26 guns

The CL-154 class of 5-inch (127 mm) gun light cruisers was a United States Navy project from the last two years of World War II, with antecedents reaching back to 1938 and earlier. The CL-154 class was contemporary to the 6-inch (152 mm) gun Worcester-class light cruisers and the 8-inch (203 mm) gun Des Moines-class heavy cruisers: like them the CL-154 design incorporated the lessons learned through World War II combat. The Navy allocated six hull numbers (CL-154 through CL-159) to the CL-154 class for the planned construction, but unlike the Worcester and Des Moines classes the CL-154 class would be cancelled with no units named or constructed. Had these ships been built, they would have been given the hull classification CLAA (anti-aircraft light cruiser) on 18 March 1949.

== Overview ==
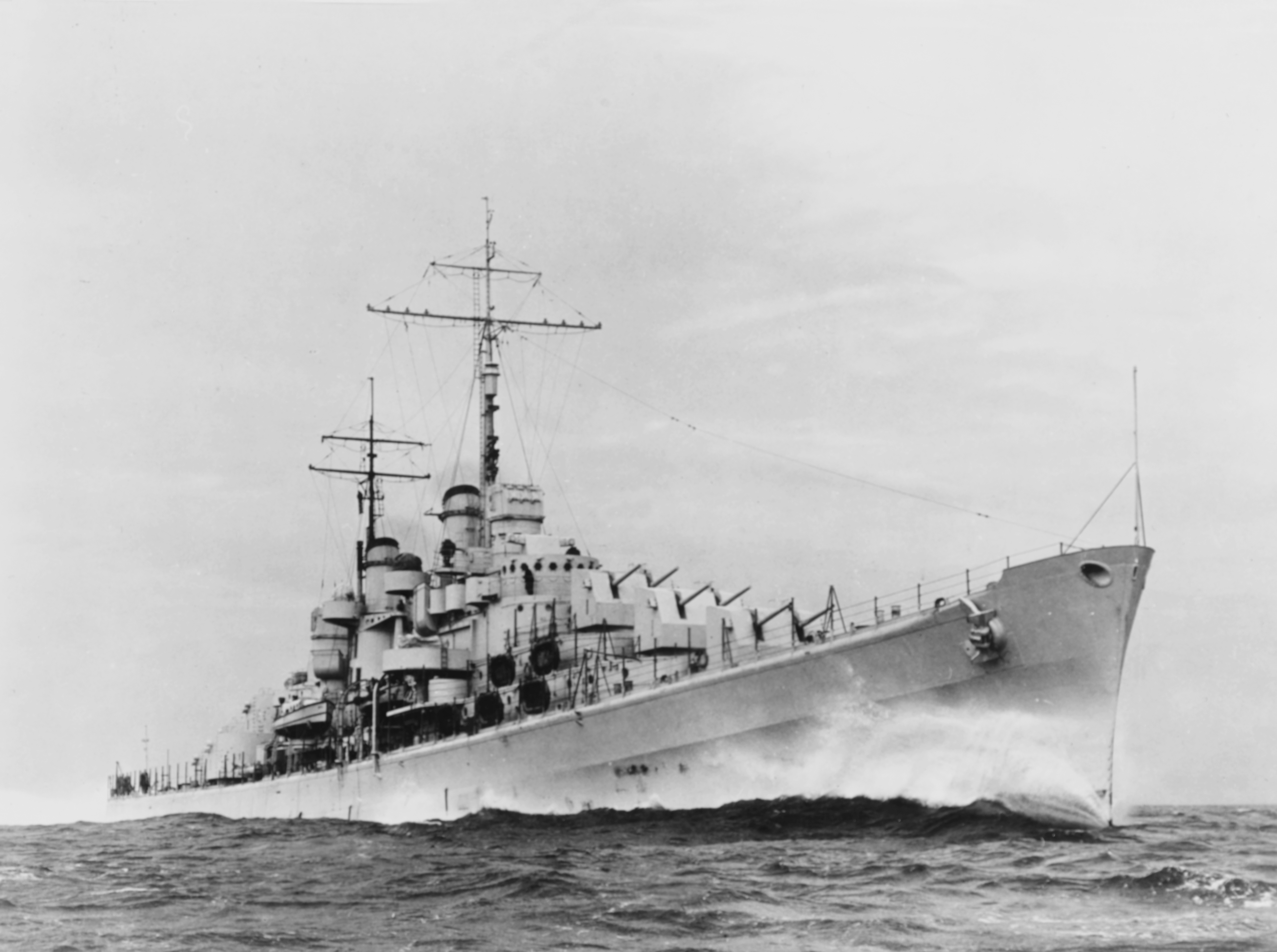
USS Atlanta (CL-51)

The CL-154 class was the final attempt to build a "super-Atlanta-class cruiser" by replacing the Atlanta's 5-inch/38-caliber gun with the new 5-inch/54-caliber Mark 16 gun. The new gun had a higher rate of fire and a longer range than the 38-caliber gun, and fired a heavier and more destructive projectile; the only downside to the new gun was a heavier mount, faster barrel wear, and greater crew fatigue if forced into manually loading. It was slated for installation in the projected Montana-class battleships, and its developer, the Navy's Bureau of Ordnance / BuOrd desired to find additional applications for it. A light cruiser installation for the new gun similar in design to the Atlanta class was naturally attractive to BuOrd.

== The Atlanta class ==
The 1936 Second London Naval Treaty imposed limits that resulted in the Atlanta class with the 5-inch/38-caliber gun dual purpose rapid fire main gun battery, the first such ship in the Navy.

== The CLD ==
The first attempt to design a super-Atlanta using the 5-inch/54-caliber Mark 16 gun was the "Cruiser-Destroyer", or CLD of 1938. The name reflected an intended minor role of the Atlanta class as a destroyer flotilla leader. The design study ended in 1940 without any ships started due to more pressing priorities. The "ship characteristics" resulting from the study would be almost identical to that of the later CL-154 design.

== World War II developments ==
When the United States entered World War II the 5-inch gun Atlanta class was under construction: eight Atlanta-class ships would ultimately be completed. As the Navy gained experience with combat conditions, it was decided that the Atlantas needed improvement. However, major improvements would cause unacceptable delays in the construction programs. It was decided that the Atlantas and other cruisers would be succeeded by two new generations, an "interim" generation with minor improvements that were easily added during the war, and a later generation near the war's end which would incorporate major improvements including new gun types.

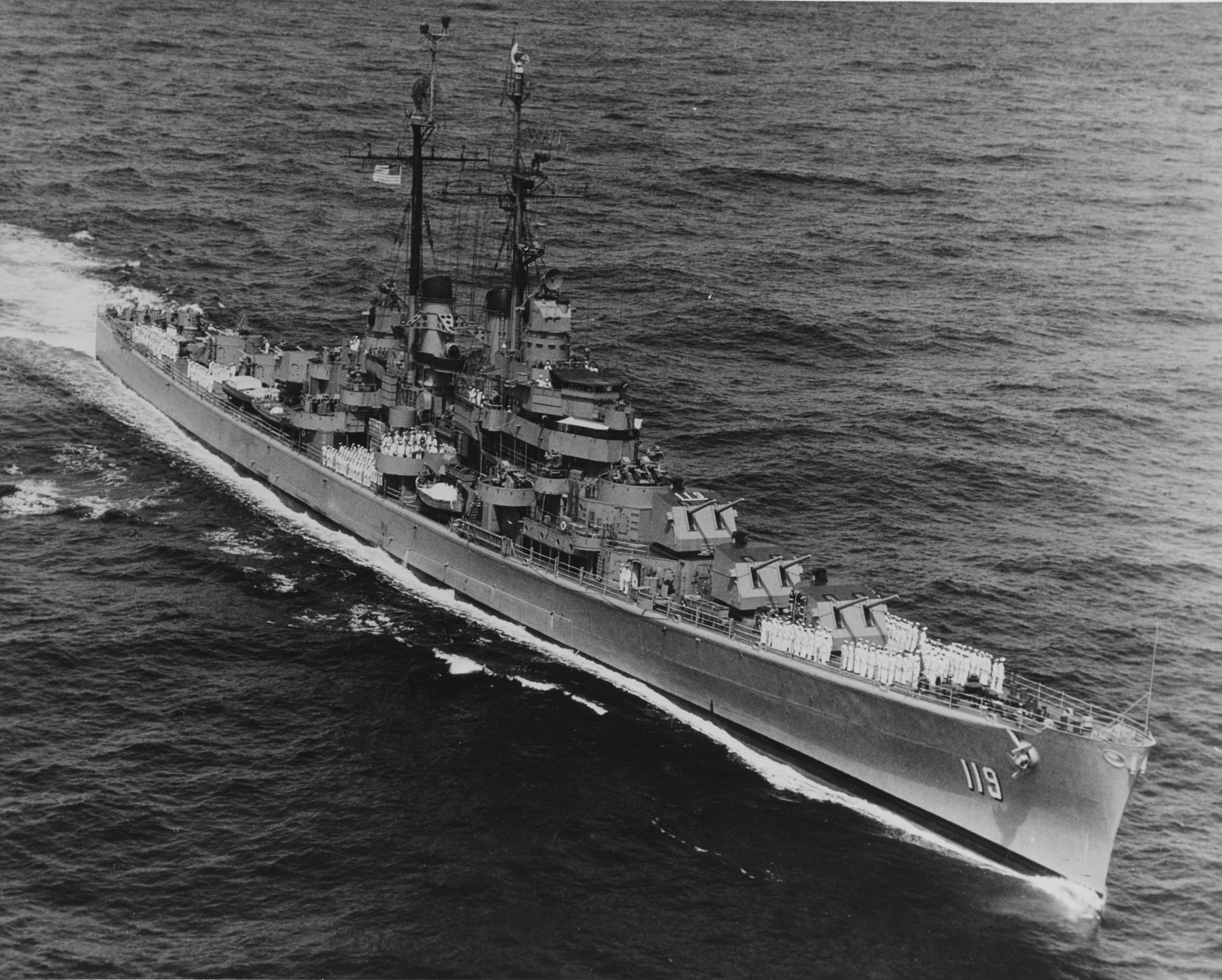
USS Juneau (CL-119)

The "interim" generation would include the 5-inch gun Juneau class. By late 1944 the Navy had realized that the ship construction program could be cut back due to the near-total destruction of the Imperial Japanese Navy. The number of the ships of this generation would be small in comparison to the previous generation: only three Juneau-class ships were completed.

The later (and as it would turn out) final generation of gun cruisers met the same fate as the "interim" generation: only a handful were completed. The German introduction of anti-ship guided missiles and the Japanese use of kamikaze attacks (which were in effect missiles guided under direct human control) made all anti-aircraft guns smaller than the 3-inch gun obsolete and increased pressure to adopt 5- and 6-inch dual purpose (DP) guns which were capable of attacking both airborne and surface targets at longer ranges and with higher rates of fire. BuOrd had begun development of such gun designs in the 1930s, including the 5-inch/54-caliber Mark 16, and had continued to push for ships that would act as testbeds for their new guns. The Navy agreed in the waning days of World War II to construct a small number of cruisers for this purpose, including the 5-inch gun CL-154 class. Initially the Navy wanted at least one squadron of six ships of each class, but in the end only two Worcester-class and three Des Moines-class cruisers would be completed, and the CL-154 class would be cancelled in its entirety.

== The CL-154 class ==
BuOrd had again proposed a 5-inch/54 caliber gun cruiser in June 1942, and the Bureau of Ships / BuShips noted that two unfinished Atlanta-class hulls could be converted if one less turret was installed and other compensations were made (for example, increasing the beam of the ships by a foot, or reducing the armor thickness). The General Board killed the proposal two months later largely on logistical grounds (i.e., the difficulties of adding a new ammunition type to the fleets).

The General Board began to reconsider in the spring of 1944. BuShips noted that the as-yet unlaunched Juneau class was already overweight despite every effort to reduce it, which meant a larger hull would be required for any follow-on design, and that projected improvements in aircraft would likely make the move to the 5-inch/54 caliber gun necessary. BuShips presentations of design studies to the General Board in October and then December 1944 showed it was extremely difficult to design a cruiser with adequate armor on a hull displacement large enough to accommodate six or eight twin 5-inch/54 caliber gun mounts plus a robust secondary battery, but small enough to obtain a 35-knot (65 km/h; 40 mph) speed on two propellers; more propellers would have meant an even larger and more expensive ship, an unacceptable result. Still, six hull numbers were allocated to the project at this time, CL-154 through CL-159.

=== Cancellation ===
The CL-154 class was cancelled on 27 March 1945 due to broad naval budget cuts ordered by President Franklin D. Roosevelt, but Secretary of the Navy James Forrestal reinstated the design study on 10 May 1945 in recognition of the Atlanta class's successful history of screening carriers from air attack. In June 1945 BuOrd ranked the 5-inch gun for the CL-154 class as their sixth top priority. The new Ship Characteristics Board / SCB set the final ship characteristics for the class in September 1945, which included dropping the 20 mm and 40 mm secondary batteries in favor of six or eight dual mounts of the new 3"/70 Mark 26 gun. Weeks later the SCB recommended the class be cancelled on cost-effectiveness grounds. The projected ship would be expensive, equal to the cost of two proposed destroyers with similar armament, a proposal that would become the Mitscher-class destroyers (but eventually with the single mount 5"/54 caliber Mark 42 gun instead of the dual mount 5"/54 caliber Mark 16): the two destroyers would be more operationally flexible and survivable than – but with only two-thirds of the volume of fire of – the one cruiser. No further action was taken.

== See also ==
- List of cruisers of the United States Navy
