= USS Franklin D. Roosevelt =

Midway-class aircraft carrier of the US Navy

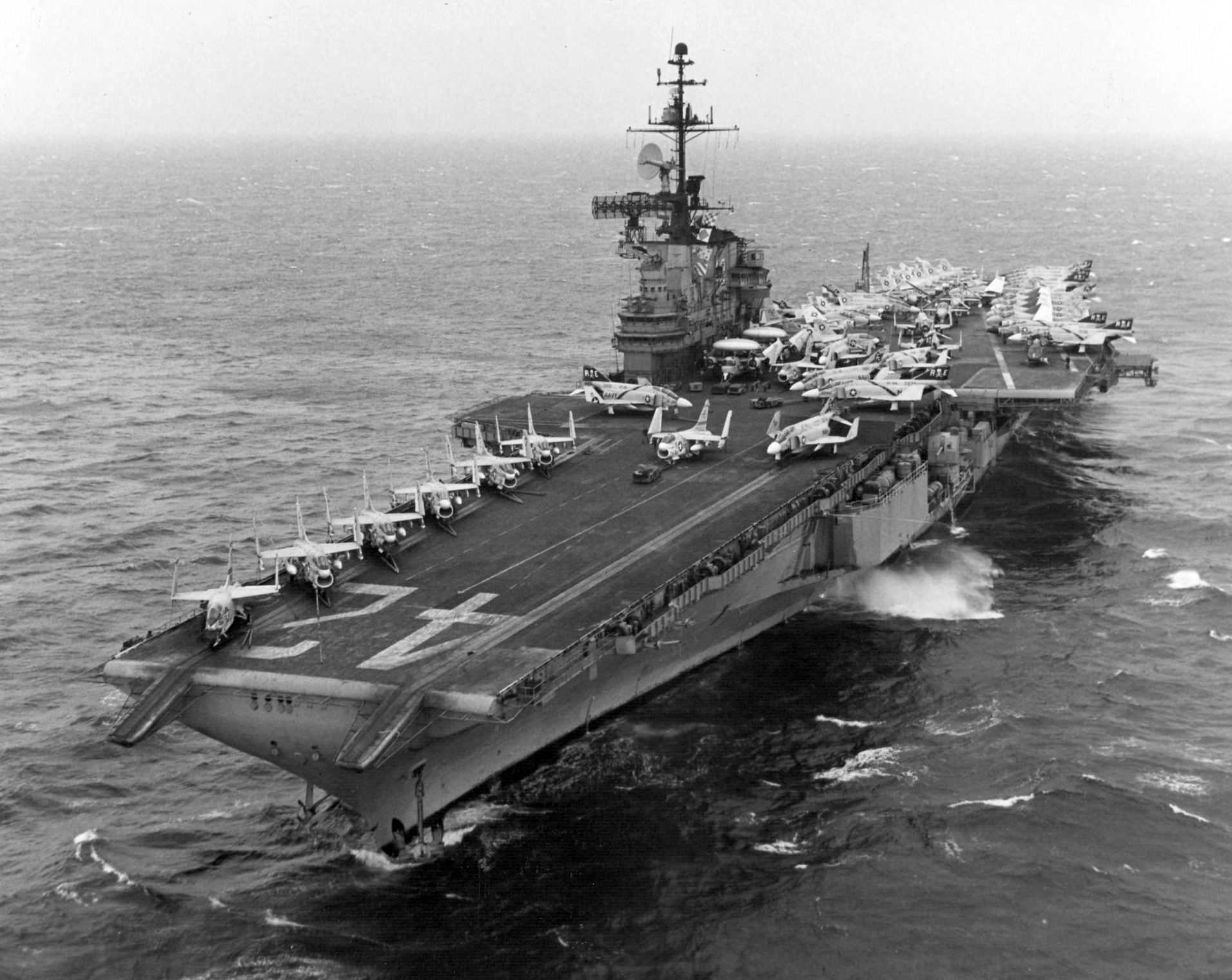
- USS Franklin D. Roosevelt in 1971

History

United States
- Name: Franklin D. Roosevelt
- Namesake: Franklin D. Roosevelt
- Builder: New York Naval Shipyard
- Laid down: 1 December 1943
- Launched: 29 April 1945
- Commissioned: 27 October 1945
- Decommissioned: 23 April 1954
- Recommissioned: 6 April 1956
- Decommissioned: 30 September 1977
- Reclassified: CVB-42, 15 July 1943; CVA-42, 1 October 1952; CV-42, 30 June 1975
- Stricken: 1 October 1977
- Nickname(s): Swanky Franky; Foo-De-Roo; Rosie; Rusty Rosie
- Fate: Scrapped, 3 May 1978
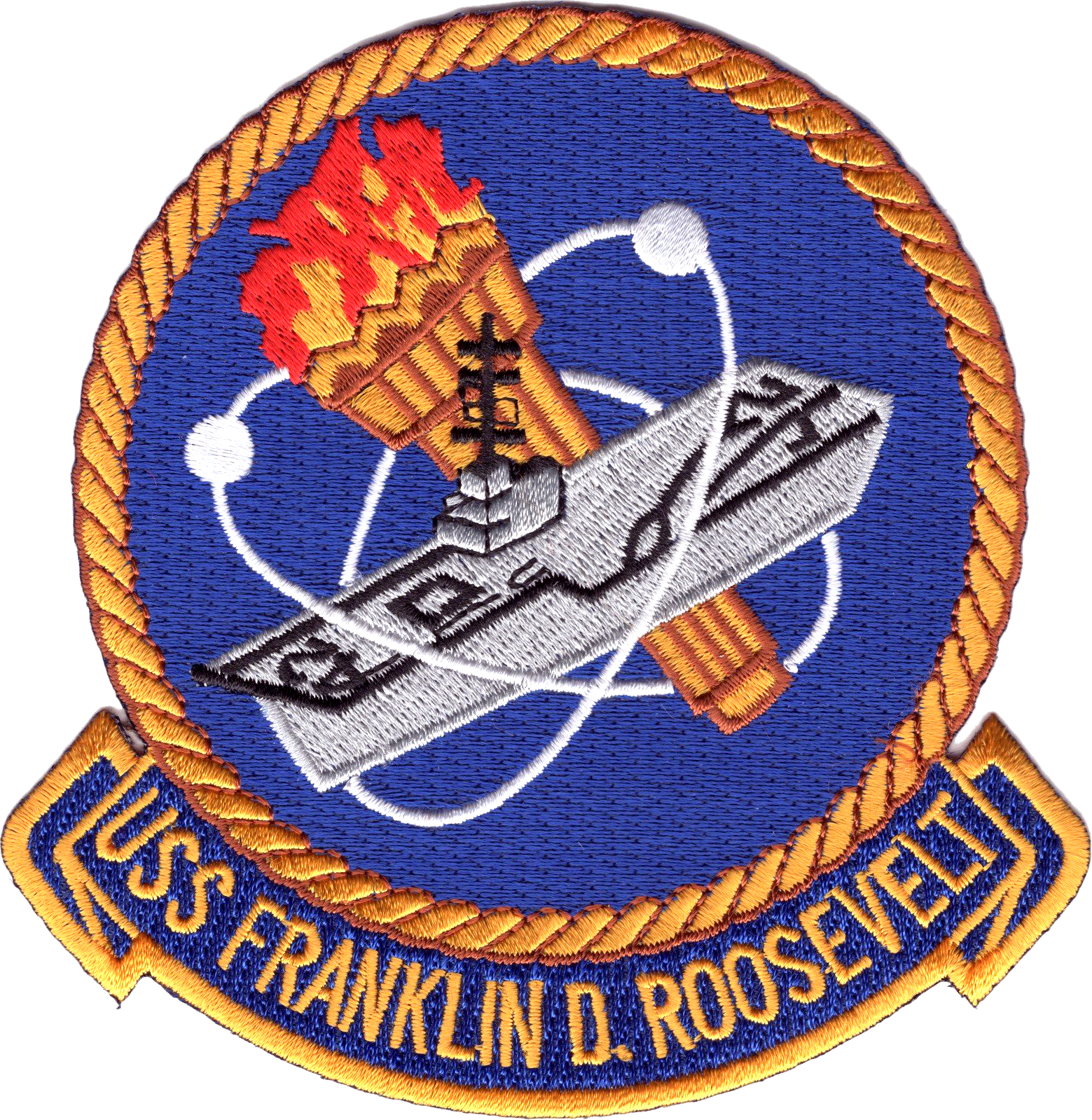
- Badge

General characteristics (as built)
- Class & type: Midway-class aircraft carrier
- Displacement: 45,000 tons
- Length: 968 ft (295 m)
- Beam: 113 ft (34 m)
- Draft: 35 ft (11 m)
- Speed: 33 kn (61 km/h; 38 mph)
- Complement: 4,104 officers and men
- Armament: 18 × 1 – 5"/54 caliber Mark 16 guns; 21 × 4 – 40 mm Bofors /60 caliber guns
- Aircraft carried: 137

USS Franklin D. Roosevelt (CVB/CVA/CV-42) was the second of three Midway-class aircraft carriers. To her crew, she was known as "Swanky Franky", "Foo-De-Roo", or "Rosie". Roosevelt spent most of her active deployed career operating in the Mediterranean Sea as part of the United States Sixth Fleet. The ship was decommissioned in 1977 and was scrapped shortly afterward. She was the first aircraft carrier of the United States Navy to be named in honor of a President of the United States.

== Early career ==
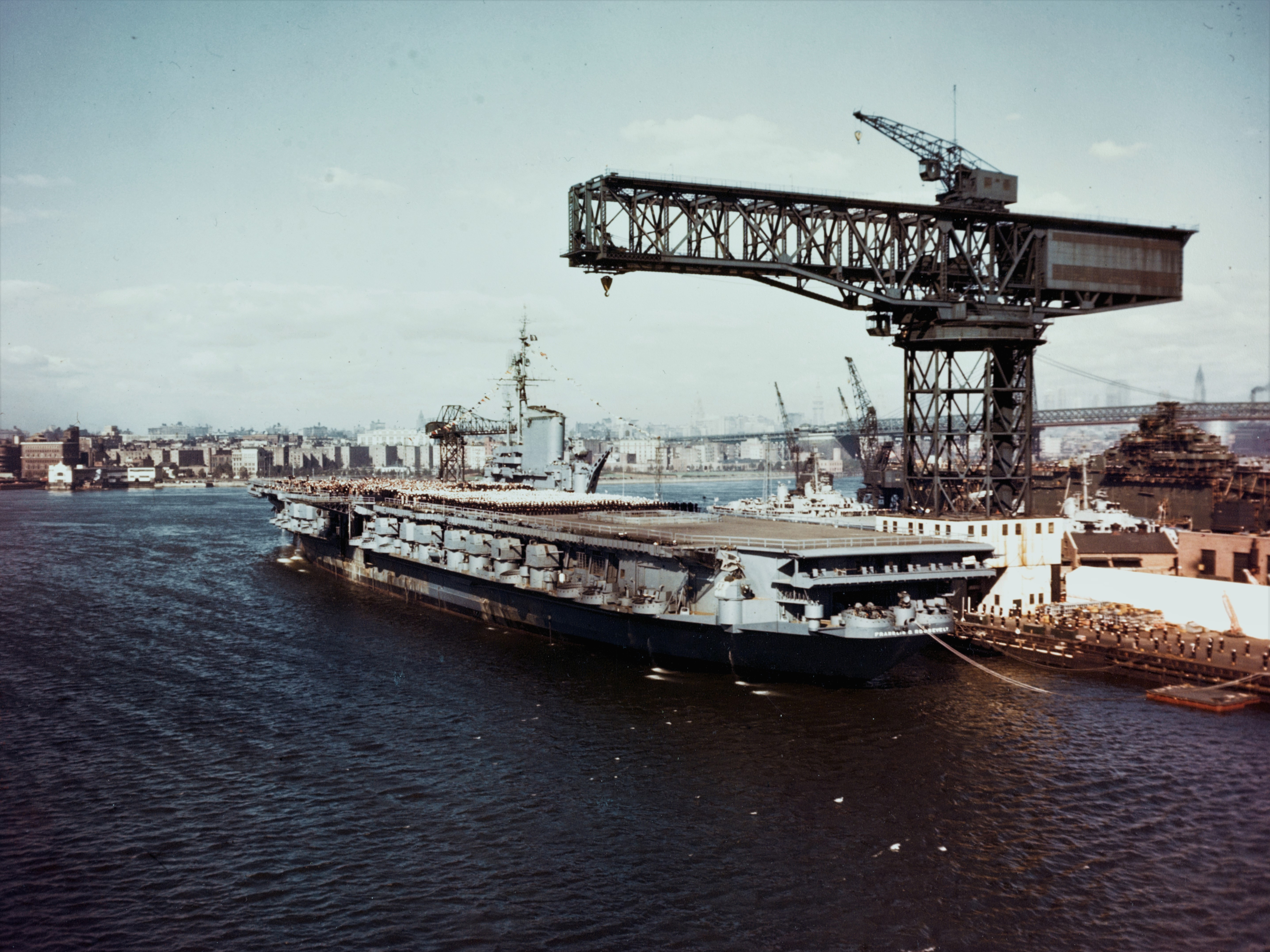
Roosevelt at commissioning ceremonies in 1945

CVB-42 was laid down at New York Naval Shipyard on 1 December 1943. Sponsor Mrs. John H. Towers, wife of the deputy commander-in-chief, Pacific Fleet, christened the ship Coral Sea at the 29 April 1945 launching. On 8 May 1945, President Harry S. Truman approved the Secretary of the Navy's recommendation to rename the ship Franklin D. Roosevelt in honor of the late President, who had died four weeks earlier. The name Coral Sea then would be used for the third ship of the class.

Roosevelt was commissioned on Navy Day, 27 October 1945, at the New York Naval Shipyard. Capt. Apollo Soucek was the ship's first commanding officer. During her shakedown cruise, Roosevelt called at Rio de Janeiro from 1 to 11 February 1946 to represent the United States at the inauguration of Brazilian President Eurico Gaspar Dutra, who came aboard for a short cruise. During April and May, Roosevelt participated in Eighth Fleet maneuvers off the East Coast, the Navy's first major postwar training exercise.

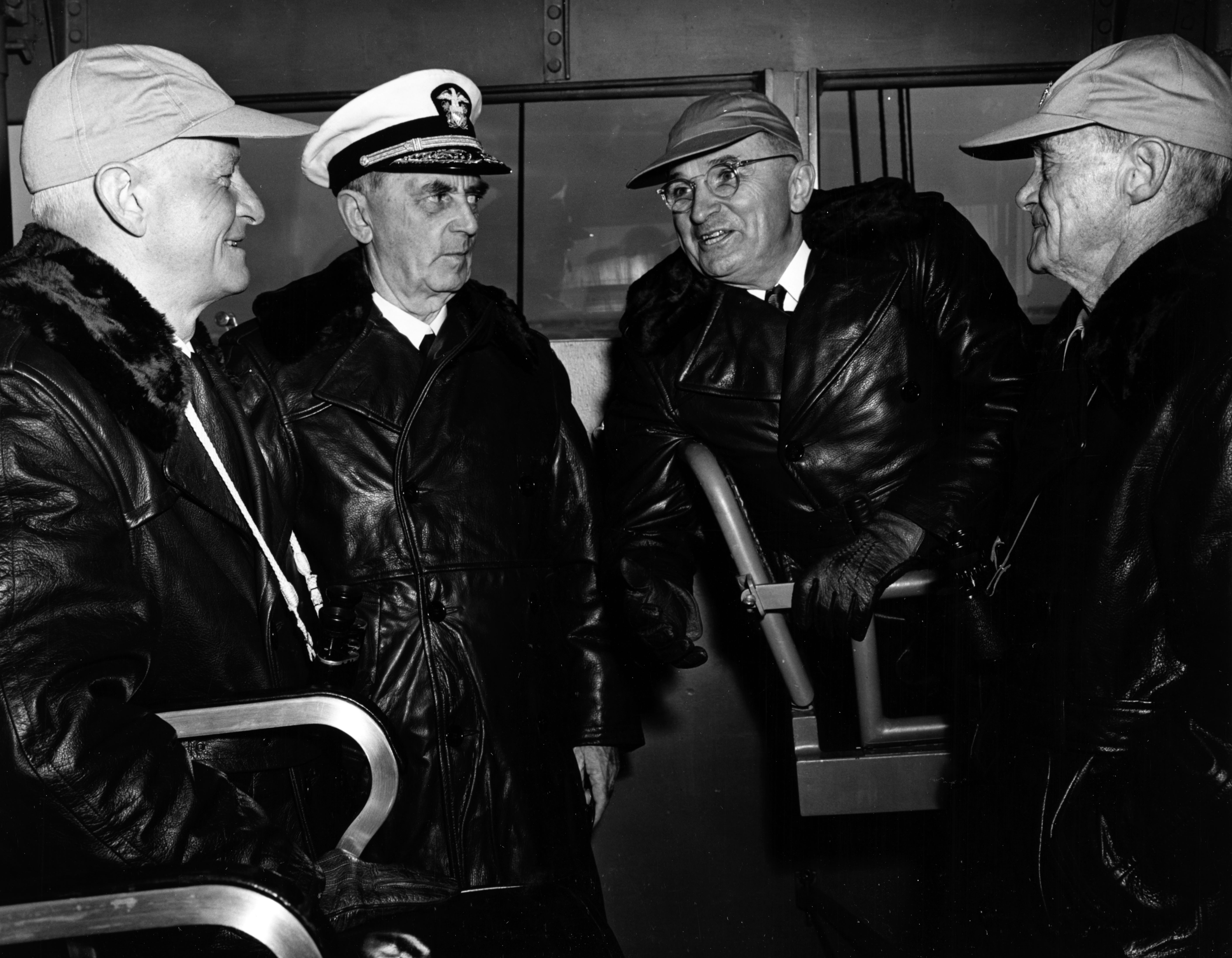
Fleet Admiral Chester W. Nimitz, Fleet Admiral William D. Leahy, President Harry S. Truman, and Vice Admiral Marc A. Mitscher on the bridge of USS Franklin D. Roosevelt (CV-42) during maneuvers off the Virginia Capes, 24 April 1946

On 21 July 1946, Roosevelt became the first American carrier to operate an all-jet aircraft under controlled conditions. Lieutenant Commander James Davidson, flying the McDonnell XFD-1 Phantom, made a series of successful takeoffs and landings as Roosevelt lay off Cape Henry, Virginia. Jet trials continued in November, when Lieutenant Colonel Marion E. Carl, USMC, made two catapult launches, four unassisted takeoffs, and five arrested landings in a Lockheed P-80A.

Fleet maneuvers and other training operations in the Caribbean preceded Roosevelt's first deployment to the Mediterranean, which lasted from August to October 1946. Roosevelt, flying the flag of Rear Admiral John H. Cassady, Commander, Carrier Division 1, led the U.S. Navy force that arrived in Piraeus on 5 September 1946. This visit showed U.S. support for the pro-Western government of Greece, which was locked in a civil war with Communist insurgents. The ship received thousands of visitors during her calls to many Mediterranean ports. This was the first of 20 Mediterranean deployments Roosevelt would make, initiating an American aircraft carrier presence that would develop into the United States Sixth Fleet.

Roosevelt returned to American waters and operated off the East Coast until July 1947, when her open bow was destroyed by a storm, which forced her to go to Norfolk Naval Shipyard for an extensive overhaul. At that time, her quadruple 40 mm Bofors antiaircraft guns were replaced by 40 3-inch (76 mm) Mark 22 guns in Mark 33 twin mountings.

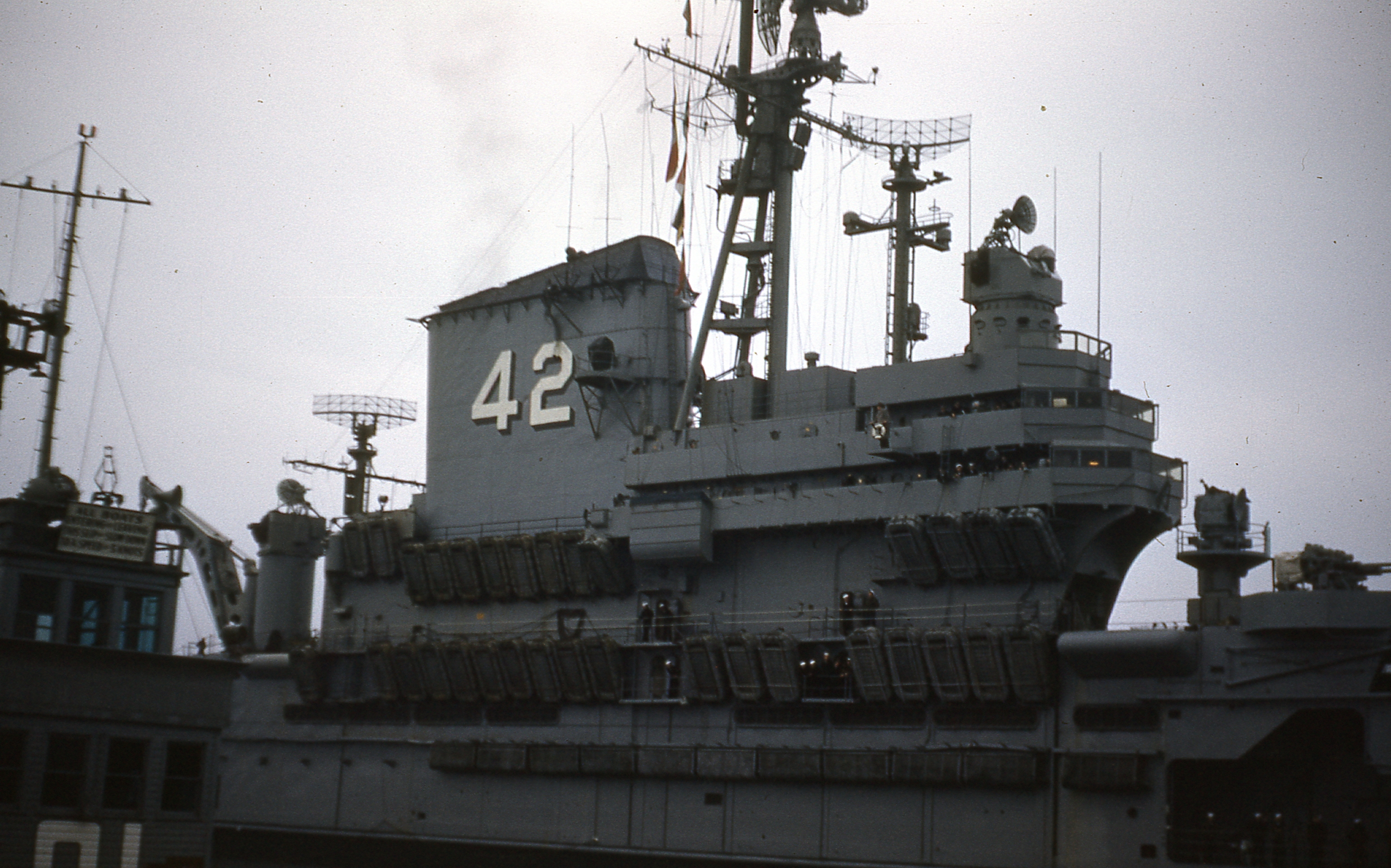
Roosevelt at Pier 91 in Seattle, 1953 or 1954

From September 1948 to January 1949, Roosevelt undertook a second tour of duty with U.S. Naval Forces, Mediterranean. In 1950, Roosevelt became the first carrier to take nuclear weapons to sea. In September and October 1952, she participated in Operation Mainbrace, the first major NATO exercise in the North Atlantic. Roosevelt operated with other major fleet units, including the aircraft carriers USS Midway, USS Wasp, and HMS Eagle, as well as the battleships USS Wisconsin and HMS Vanguard.

Roosevelt was reclassified CVA-42 on 1 October 1952. On 7 January 1954, she sailed for Puget Sound Naval Shipyard to undergo extensive reconstruction. Too large to pass through the Panama Canal, Roosevelt rounded Cape Horn and arrived at the shipyard on 5 March 1954. She was temporarily decommissioned there for her refit on 23 April 1954.

== Refit ==
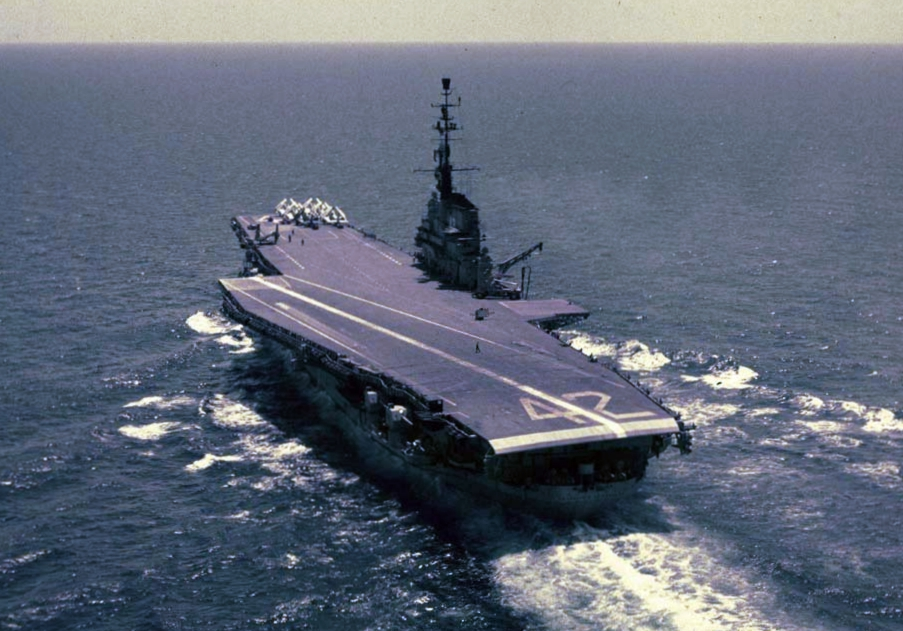
Franklin D. Roosevelt in 1956, after SCB-110 reconstruction

Franklin D. Roosevelt was the first of her class to undergo the SCB 110 reconstruction, at a cost of $48 million. She received an enclosed hurricane bow, one C-11-2 and two C-11-1 steam catapults, strengthened arresting gear, an enlarged bridge, a mirror landing system, and a 482-foot (147 m) angled flight deck. SPS-8 height-finding radar and SPS-12 air-search radar were mounted on a new tubular mast. The aft elevator was relocated to the starboard deck edge, the forward elevator was enlarged, and all elevators were uprated to 75,000 lb (34,000 kg) capacity. Aviation fuel bunkerage was increased from 350,000 to 450,000 gallons (1,320,000 to 1,700,000 L). Standard displacement rose to 51,000 tons, while deep load displacement rose to 63,400 tons. As weight compensation, several of the 5-inch (127 mm) Mark 16 antiaircraft guns were removed, leaving only 10, and the 3,200-ton armor belt was removed. Hull blisters were also added to cope with the increased weight. Franklin D. Roosevelt was recommissioned on 6 April 1956.

After postrefit trials, Roosevelt sailed for her new homeport of Naval Station Mayport, Florida. In February 1957, she conducted cold-weather tests of catapults, aircraft, and the Regulus guided missile, in the Gulf of Maine. In July, she sailed for the first of three consecutive Sixth Fleet deployments. Her assignments in the Mediterranean added NATO exercises to her normal schedule of major fleet operations and found her entertaining a list of distinguished guests each year.

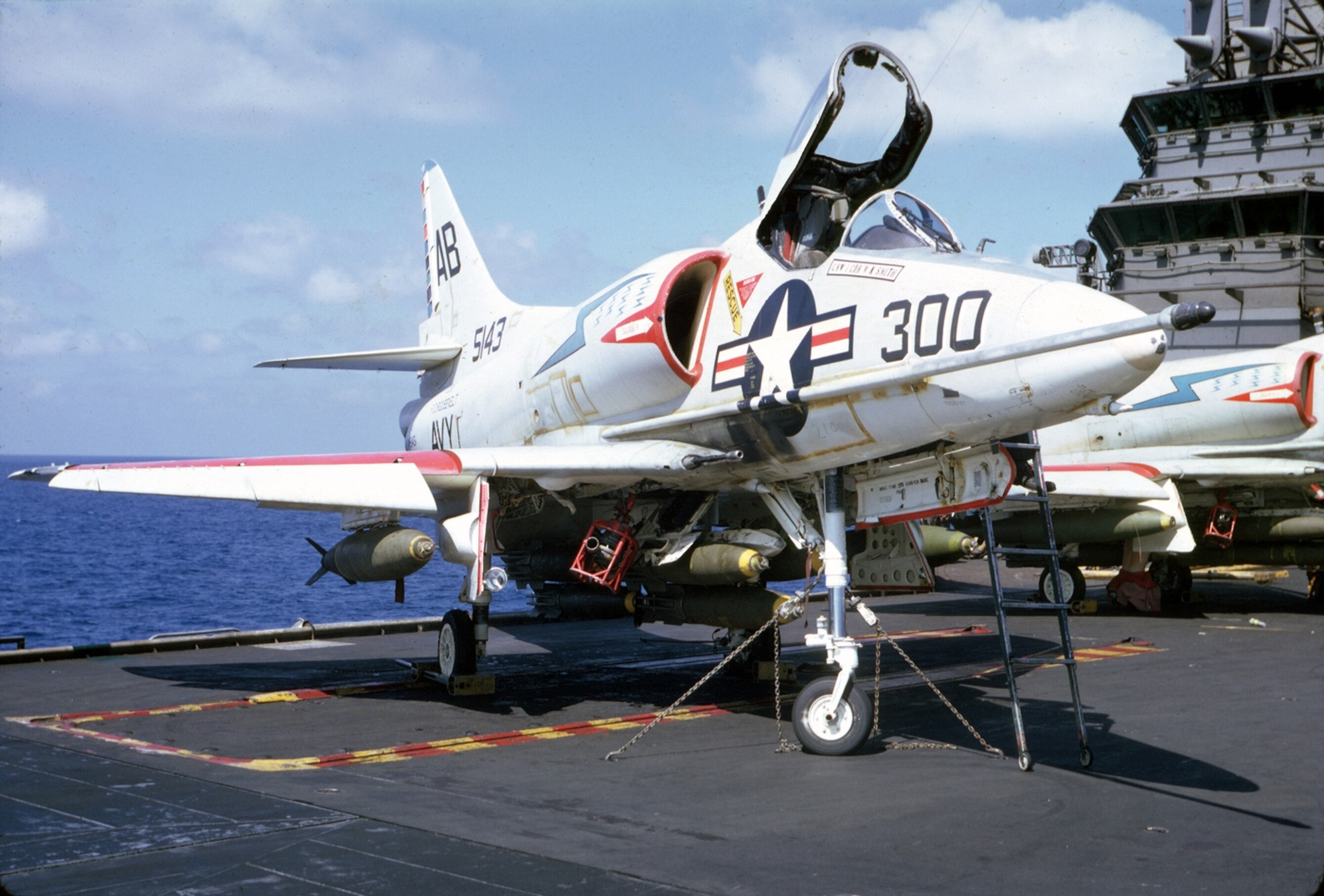
An A-4 Skyhawk of VA-172 aboard Franklin D. Roosevelt during her only Vietnam deployment between August 1966 and February 1967

During a 1958 midyear overhaul, the 22 remaining 3-inch (76 mm) guns were removed.

On 24 October 1958, Franklin D. Roosevelt supported USS Kleinsmith in the evacuation of 56 American citizens and three foreign nationals from Nicaragua and Cuba, as the Cuban Revolution came to a climax.

In late 1960, the Control Instrument Company installed the first production Fresnel lens optical landing system onboard Franklin D. Roosevelt. She recorded her 100,000th aircraft landing in March 1961. During a 1963 overhaul, six more 5-inch (127 mm) guns were removed.

While operating in the Eastern Mediterranean in the fall of 1964, Franklin D. Roosevelt lost a blade from one of her 20-ton propellers. She proceeded from Naples, Italy, to New York with the number-one shaft locked. After replacing the propeller at Bayonne, New Jersey, she returned to the Mediterranean to complete her cruise.

From August 1966 to January 1967, Franklin D. Roosevelt made her only deployment to Southeast Asia, spending 95 days "on the line". Her embarked air wing, Carrier Air Wing One, consisted mainly of F-4 Phantom IIs and A-4 Skyhawks. Roosevelt received one battle star for her service during the Vietnam War.

In January 1968, Italian actress Virna Lisi was invited by Franklin D. Roosevelt's crew to participate in the ship's 22nd birthday celebrations. Lisi helped prepare 5,000 T-bone steaks at a large cook-out staged on the flight deck.

== Austere modernization ==
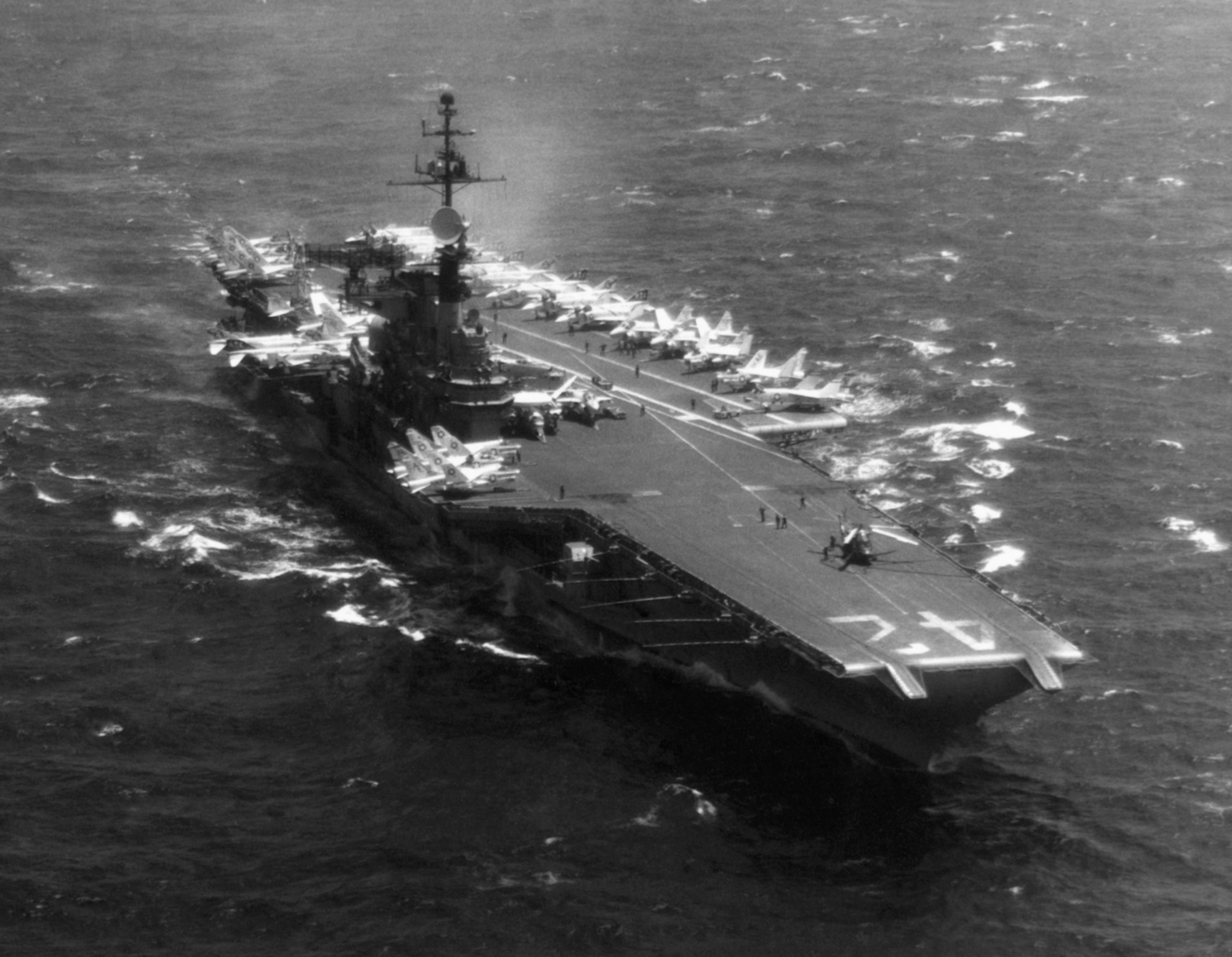
Roosevelt in 1970 after her austere, 11-month refit of 1968–69

Roosevelt was initially slated to undergo an extensive reconstruction (SCB 101.68) similar to that received by Midway from 1966 to 1970. This plan was derailed by massive cost overruns in Midway's reconstruction, which eventually totalled $202 million.

Roosevelt was therefore limited to an austere $46 million refit (SCB 103.68), enabling her to operate the Grumman A-6 Intruder and LTV A-7 Corsair II. In July 1968, she entered Norfolk Naval Shipyard for her 11-month modernization program. The forward centerline elevator was relocated to the starboard deck edge forward of the island, the port waist catapult was removed, the crew spaces were refurbished, and all of the four remaining 5-inch (127 mm) antiaircraft turrets were removed. The Roosevelt set sail with four 5-inch guns, two on either side controlled by 3 Mk 56 gunfire-control systems and one Mk 37 system. She also received a deck-edge spray system using the new seawater-compatible, fire-fighting chemical, Light Water. She put to sea again on 26 May 1969.

From 1 August 1969, Roosevelt embarked Carrier Air Wing Six, which served as the ship's air wing for the next seven cruises. In January 1970, she returned to the Mediterranean for another Sixth Fleet deployment.

Roosevelt's 21st Sixth Fleet deployment was marked by indirect participation in the October 1973 Yom Kippur War, as she served as a transit "landing field" for aircraft being delivered to Israel. Her battlegroup, Task Force 60.2, also stood by for possible evacuation contingencies.

From 1973 through 1975, VAW-121 operated aboard Roosevelt as one of the last Grumman E-1 Tracer squadrons in the fleet. 'She received a multipurpose designation, CV-42, on 30 June 1975, but she did not operate any antisubmarine aircraft.

In June 1976, Roosevelt embarked VMA-231 with 14 AV-8A Harrier attack aircraft. The ship embarked Carrier Air Wing Nineteen for its final deployment, which lasted from October 1976 to April 1977. VMA-231 was on board for this deployment, which demonstrated that VTOL aircraft could be integrated into fixed-wing air operations, although limited fuel capacity required careful scheduling of their launch and land cycles. The AV-8A's concentrated hot exhaust impinging directly perpendicular to the fight deck was unusually destructive to painted nonskid surfaces, and blowing detached pieces of the nonskid coating about created a high risk of foreign object damage to nearby jet engines. On 12 January 1977, Roosevelt collided with the Liberian grain freighter Oceanus while transiting the Strait of Messina. Both ships were able to proceed to port under their own power.

== Decommissioning and disposal ==
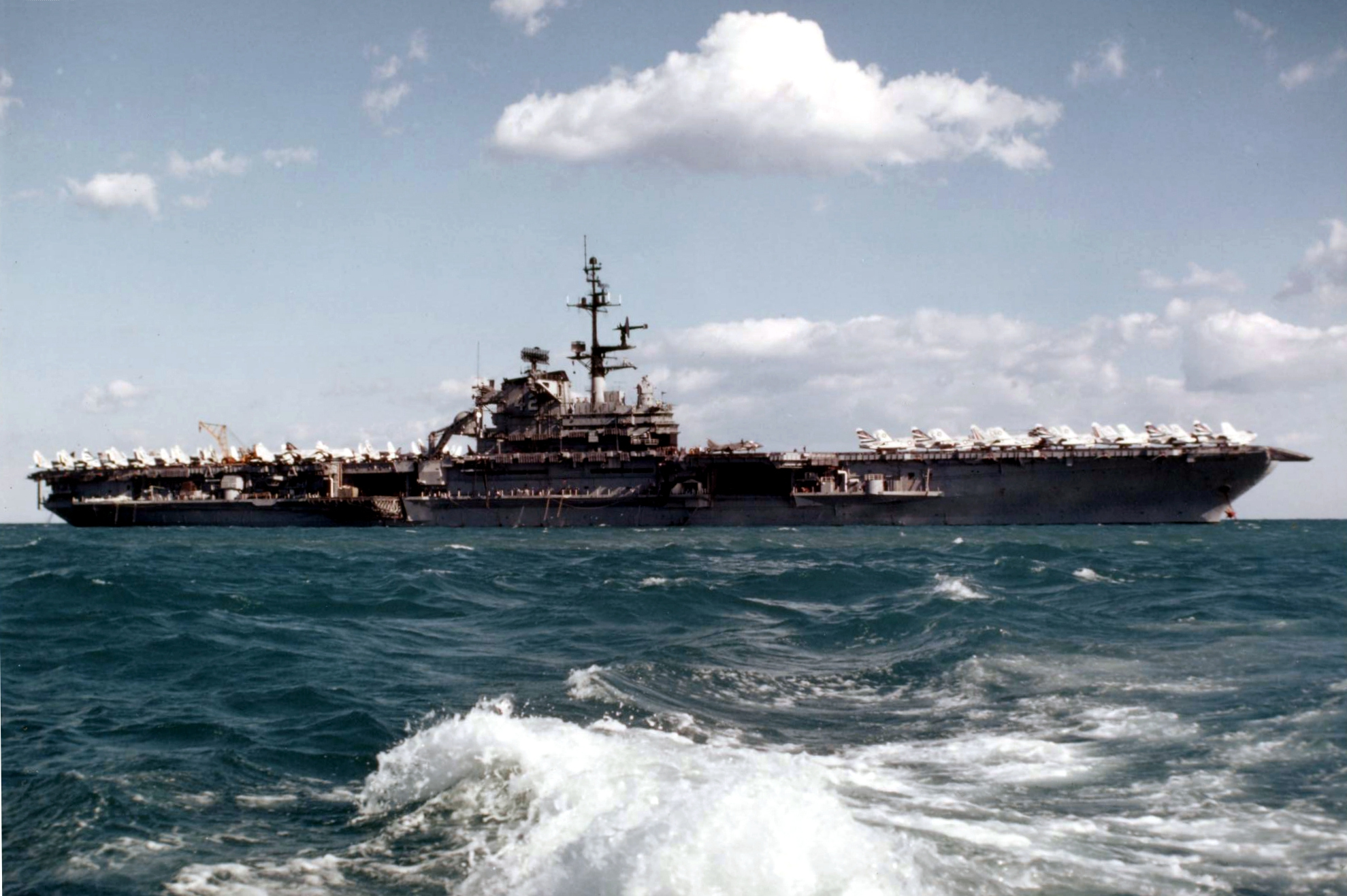
Roosevelt during her final Mediterranean cruise in 1976

By the late 1970s, USS Franklin D. Roosevelt was in poor material condition. Deprived of the upgrades that Midway and Coral Sea had received, she was the least modern and least capable of the class. Furthermore, Roosevelt used General Electric turbines, which gave persistent problems and reduced speed compared to the Westinghouse units used on the other ships. The Navy, therefore, chose to decommission Roosevelt when the second Nimitz-class carrier, Dwight D. Eisenhower, entered service in 1977. She completed her final cruise in April 1977 and was officially decommissioned on 30 September 1977. The decommissioning ceremony was held on 1 October 1977, and the ship was stricken from the Navy Directory on the same day. Efforts to preserve Roosevelt as a museum ship in New York City failed.

Roosevelt's generally poor condition weighed against retaining her in the reserve fleet. Moreover, her low hangar height of 17 feet 6 inches (5.33 m) limited the aircraft types that she could handle. It was reasoned that existing Essex-class aircraft carriers could handle the same types of aircraft at lower cost. Some admirals also feared that if Roosevelt were retained, the Carter administration would use her reactivation as a reason to cancel future Nimitz-class carriers.

On 1 April 1978, the Defense Reutilization and Marketing Service sold the ship to River Terminal Development Company for $2.1 million. After usable equipment was removed from Roosevelt at the Norfolk Naval Shipyard's Inactive Ships Facility, the carrier was towed to Kearny, New Jersey. She arrived on 3 May 1978 and was scrapped that year. One of USS Franklin D. Roosevelt's 5"/54cal Mk.16 guns is on display at White Sands Missile Range Missile Park.

== Awards and decorations ==

While the Sea Service Deployment Ribbon is retroactive to 15 August 1974, the USS Franklin D. Roosevelt was scrapped before the award was ever established and would have had to still be in active service to have received the award.

| Meritorious Unit Commendation | Navy E Ribbon with Battle "E" Device | Navy Expeditionary Medal with three stars |
| Navy Occupation Service Medal | National Defense Service Medal with star | Vietnam Service Medal with one star |
| Sea Service Deployment Ribbon | Republic of Vietnam Meritorious; Unit Citation (Gallantry Cross) | Republic of Vietnam Campaign Medal |

== Gallery ==
USS Franklin D. Roosevelt lifecycle

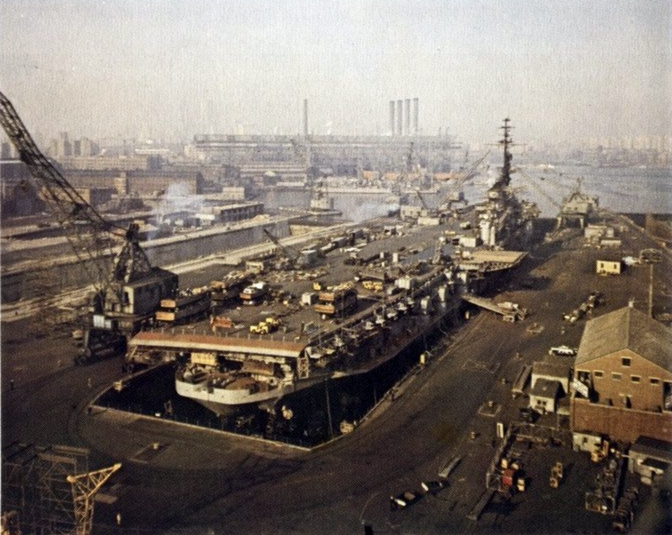
Roosevelt at New York Naval Shipyard in 1960

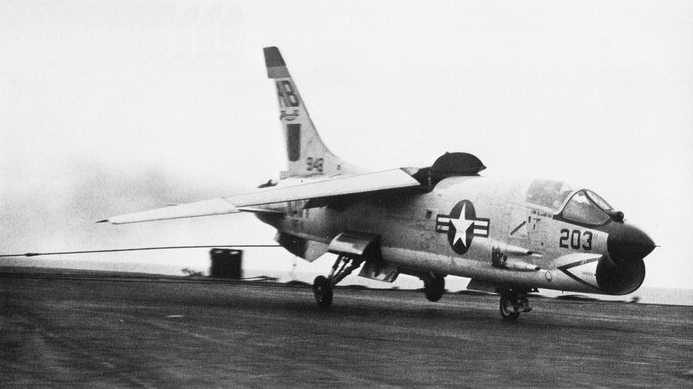
An F-8 Crusader of VF-11 catches the wire aboard Roosevelt in 1962.

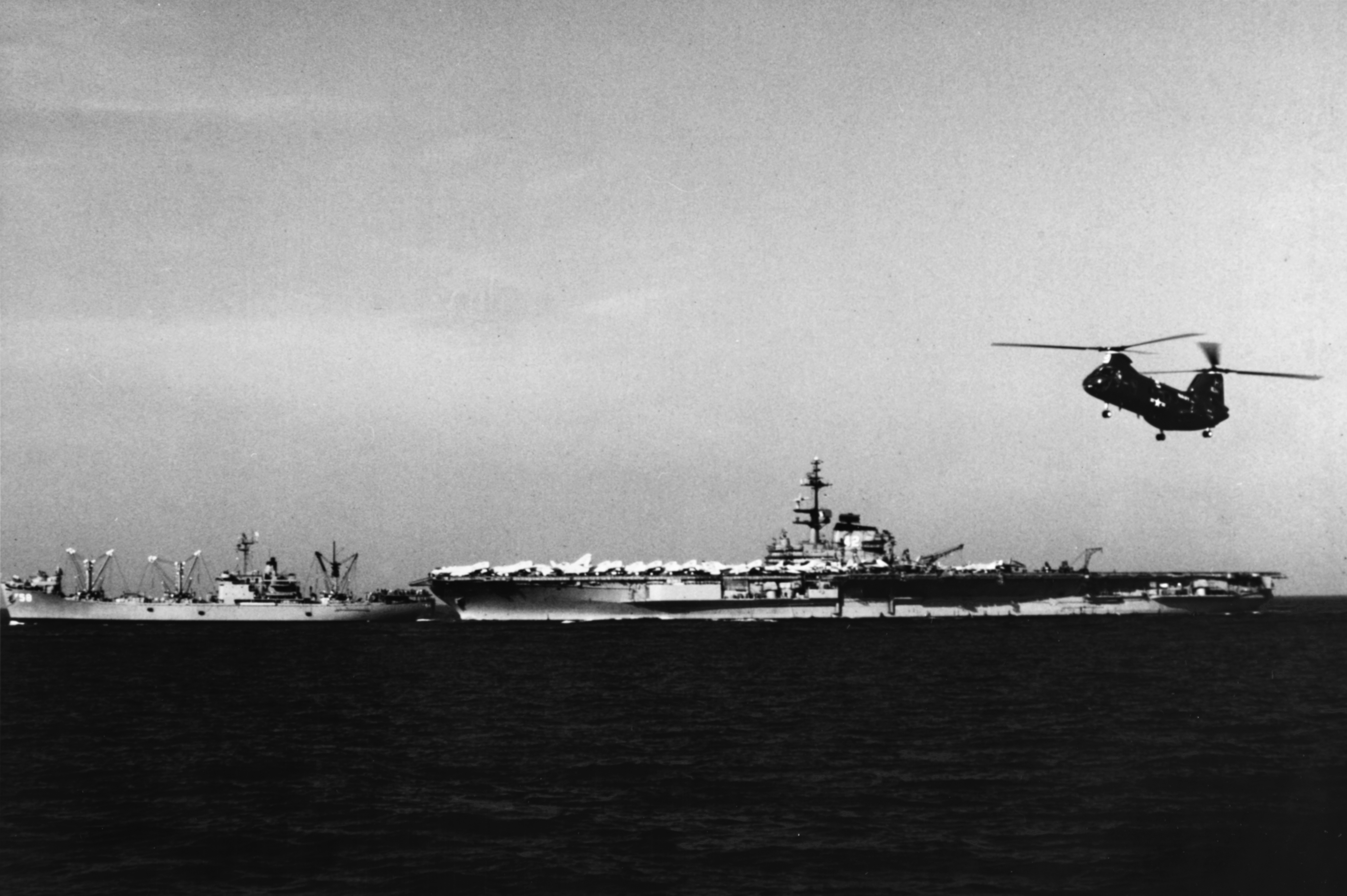
USS Franklin D. Roosevelt and USS Rigel (AF-58) underway in 1968.

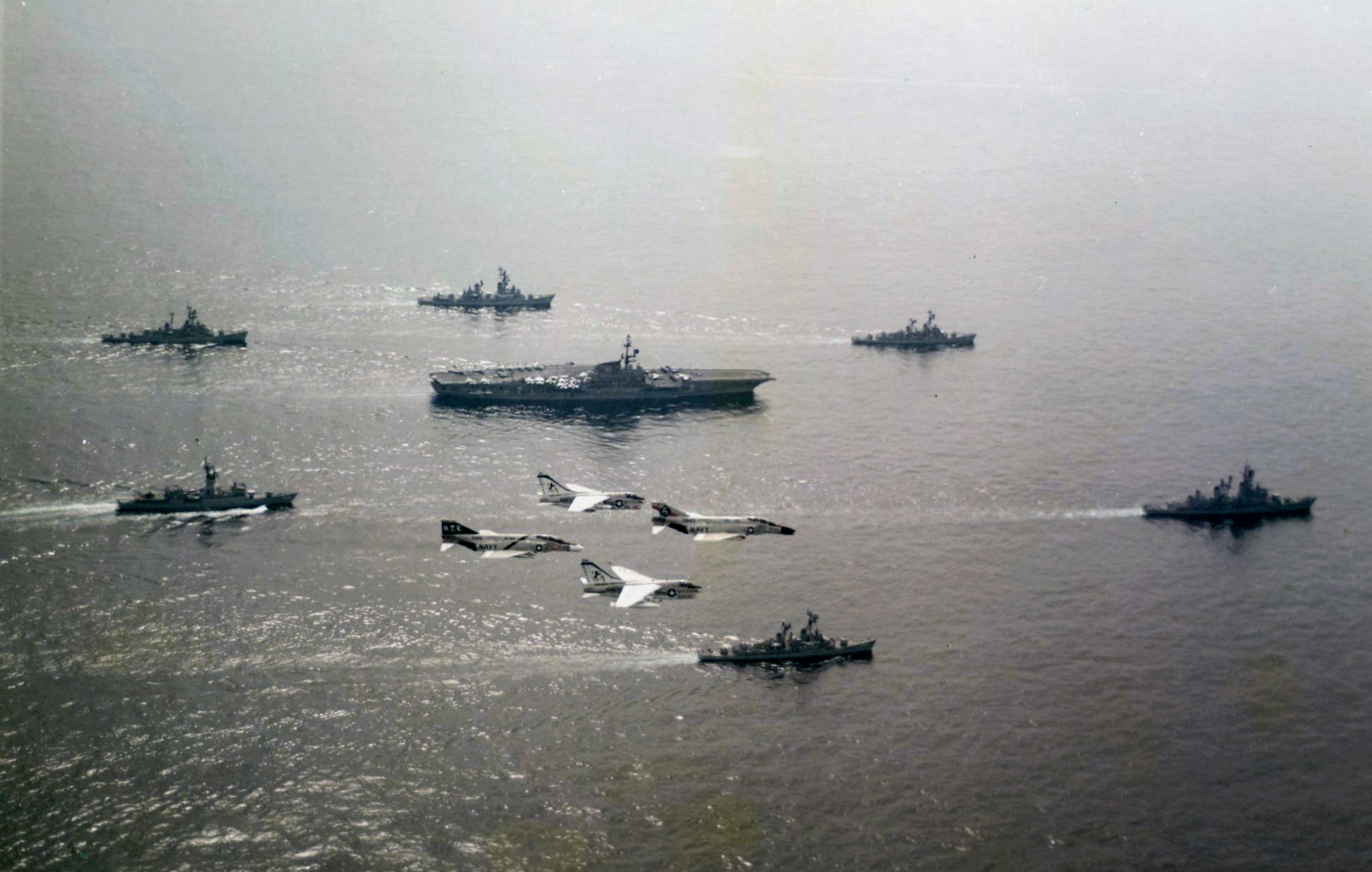
Roosevelt and her battle group in 1970.

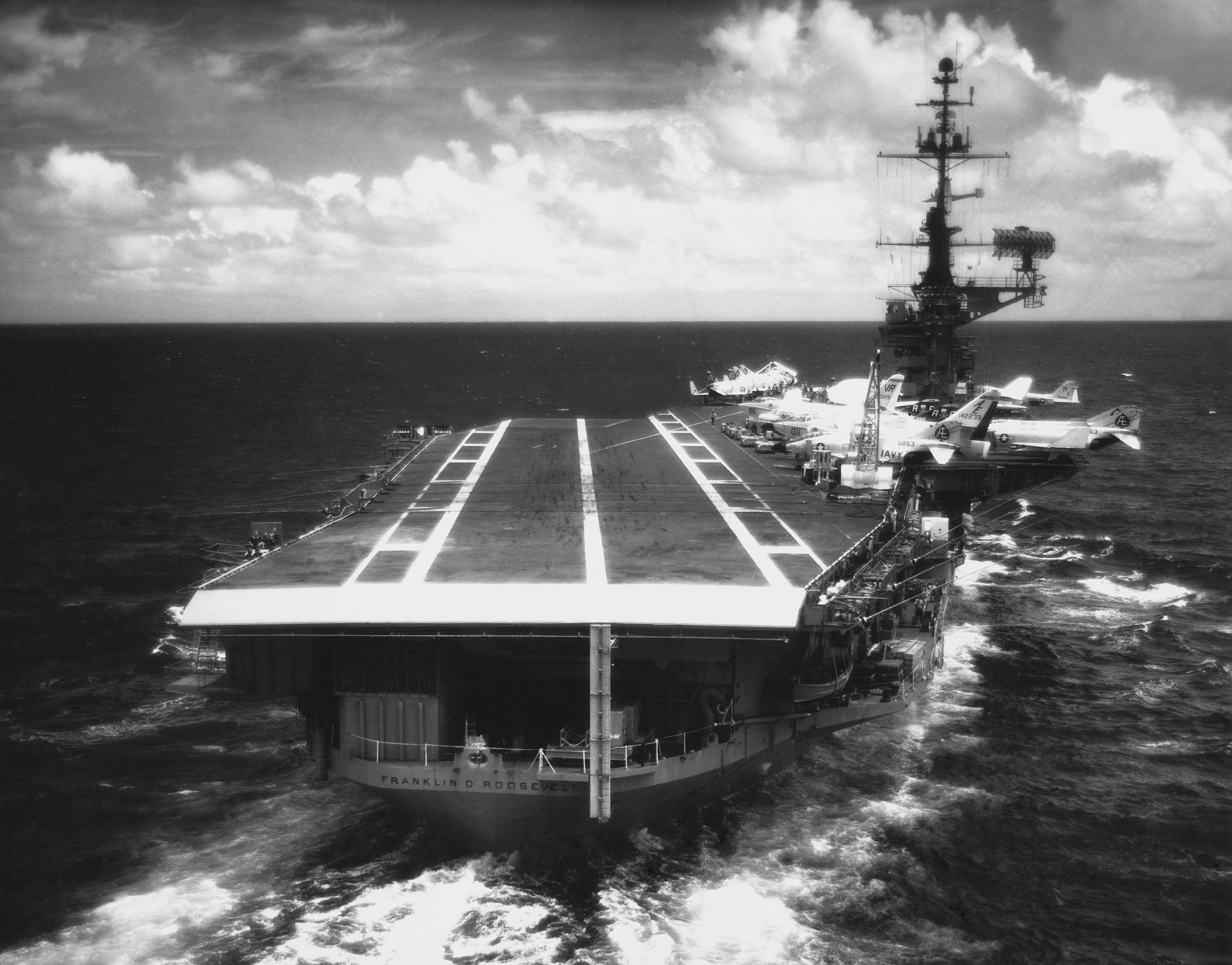
Approach to Roosevelt

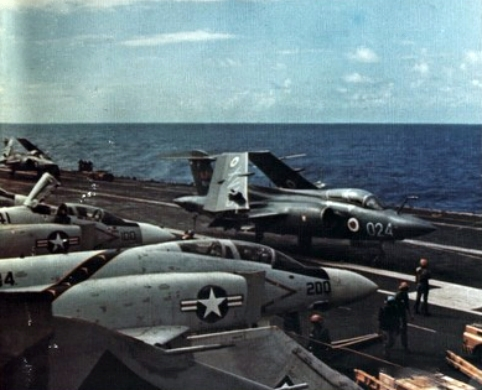
A Buccaneer of 809 NAS from HMS Ark Royal aboard Roosevelt during her 1972 Mediterranean cruise.

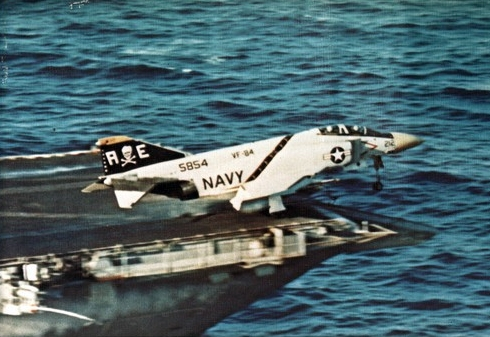
F-4J Phantom of VF-84 launching from Roosevelt during her 1972 Mediterranean cruise

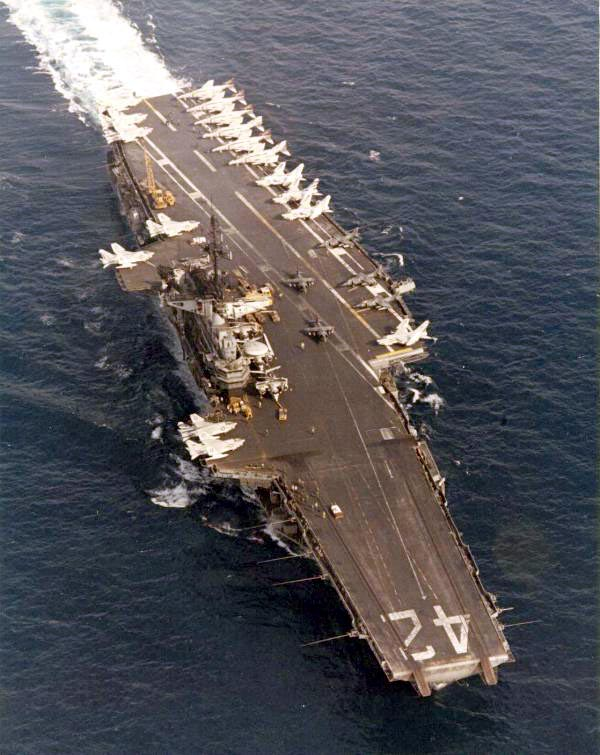
Roosevelt during her final cruise: Note the AV-8A Harrier jets parked on the flight deck, amidships in 1976–1977.

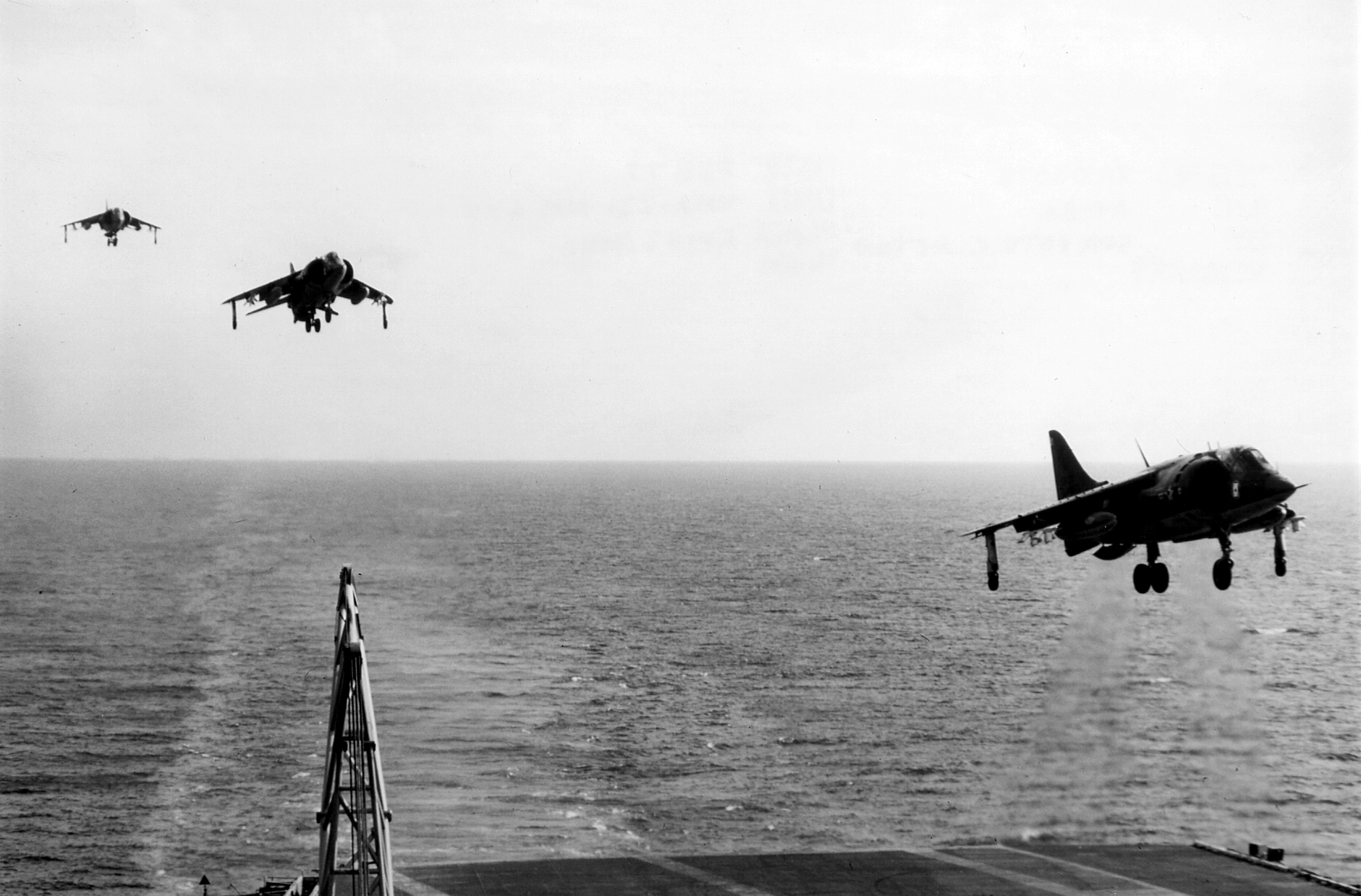
AV-8A Harriers of VMA-231 are approaching Roosevelt during her final cruise in February 1977.

== See also ==
- List of aircraft carriers
- List of aircraft carriers of the United States Navy
