= 5-inch/54-caliber Mark 16 gun =

5"/54 caliber gun Mark 16
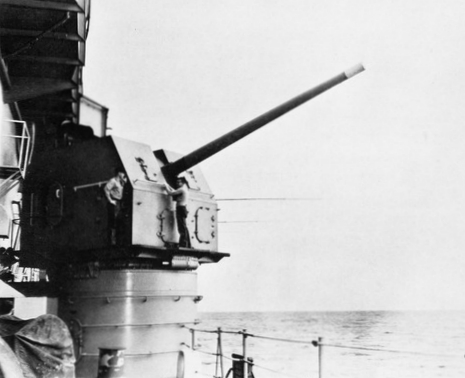
- A 5"/54 caliber Mark 16 gun on Midway.
- Type: Naval gun
- Place of origin: United States

Service history
- In service: 1945 – 1993: USN 1945-1980, JMSDF 1958-1993
- Used by: U.S. Navy and Japan Maritime Self-Defense Force
- Wars: World War II; Korean War; Vietnam War

Production history
- Designer: Bureau of Ordnance
- Designed: 1940
- Produced: 1945 – 1959

Specifications
- Mass: 5,361 lb (2,432 kg) (without breech)
- Barrel length: 270 in (6.9 m) bore (54 calibers)
- Shell: 127×836mmR 70 lb (32 kg) Mark 42 armor-piercing
- Caliber: 5 inches (127 mm)
- Elevation: −10° to +85°
- Traverse: −150° to +150°
- Rate of fire: 15–18 rounds per minute
- Muzzle velocity: 2,650 ft/s (810 m/s)
- Effective firing range: 19,000-yard (17,374 m) at 20° elevation
- Maximum firing range: 25,909-yard (23,691 m) at 45° elevation; 51,600-foot (15,728 m) at 85° elevation (anti-aircraft ceiling)

The 5"/54 caliber Mark 16 gun (spoken "five-inch-fifty-four-caliber") was a late World War II–era naval gun mount used by the United States Navy, and later, the Japan Maritime Self-Defense Force. These guns, designed originally for the Montana-class battleships and then the abortive CL-154-class cruisers, were to be the replacement for the 5"/38 caliber secondary gun batteries then in widespread use with the US Navy.

== Design ==
The 5"/54 cal gun turrets were similar to the 5"/38 caliber gun mounts in that they were equally adept in an anti-aircraft role and for damaging smaller ships, but differed in that they weighed more, fired heavier rounds of ammunition, and resulted in faster crew fatigue than the 5"/38 cal. guns.

The ammunition storage for the 5"/54 cal. gun was 500 rounds per turret, and the guns could fire at targets nearly 26,000 yards (24,000 m) away at a 45° angle. At an 85° angle, the guns could hit an aerial target at over 50,000 feet (15,000 m).

The cancellations of the Montana-class battleships in 1943 and then the CL-154 class cruisers in 1945 pushed back the first use of the 5"/54 cal guns to their installation aboard the US Navy's Midway-class aircraft carriers. The guns proved adequate for the carrier's air defense, but were gradually phased out of use by the carrier fleet because of their weight (rather than having the carrier defend itself by gunnery the task would be assigned to other surrounding ships within a carrier battle group). These mounts were then installed in the Japanese Akizuki-class and Murasame-class destroyers in 1958–59.

== Usage ==
Ship	Gun Installed	Gun Mount
USS Montana (BB-67) (cancelled 1943)	Mark 16: 20 × 5"/54 caliber	Mark 41: 10 × twin mount
USS Ohio (BB-68) (cancelled 1943)	Mark 16: 20 × 5"/54 caliber	Mark 41: 10 × twin mount
USS Maine (BB-69) (cancelled 1943)	Mark 16: 20 × 5"/54 caliber	Mark 41: 10 × twin mount
USS New Hampshire (BB-70) (cancelled 1943)	Mark 16: 20 × 5"/54 caliber	Mark 41: 10 × twin mount
USS Louisiana (BB-71) (cancelled 1943)	Mark 16: 20 × 5"/54 caliber	Mark 41: 10 × twin mount
CL-154-class cruisers (six ships, cancelled 1945)	Mark 16: 12 or 16 × 5"/54 caliber	Mark 41: 6 or 8 × twin mount
USS Midway (CV-41)	Mark 16: 18 × 5"/54 caliber (all removed by 1980)	Mark 39: 18 × single mount
USS Franklin D. Roosevelt (CV-42)	Mark 16: 18 × 5"/54 caliber (some guns removed before retirement in 1977)	Mark 39: 18 × single mount
USS Coral Sea (CV-43)	Mark 16: 14 × 5"/54 caliber (all removed by 1980)	Mark 39: 18 × single mount
USS Mississippi (AG-128)	Mark 16: 2 x 5"/54 caliber	Mark 39: 2 x single mount
JDS Murasame (DD-107) - Murasame-class destroyer	Mark 16: 3 × 5"/54 caliber	Mark 39: 3 × single mount
JDS Yūdachi (DD-108) - Murasame-class destroyer	Mark 16: 3 × 5"/54 caliber	Mark 39: 3 × single mount
JDS Harusame (DD-109) - Murasame-class destroyer	Mark 16: 3 × 5"/54 caliber	Mark 39: 3 × single mount
JDS Akizuki (DD-161) - Akizuki-class destroyer	Mark 16: 3 × 5"/54 caliber	Mark 39: 3 × single mount
JDS Teruzuki (DD-162) - Akizuki-class destroyer	Mark 16: 3 × 5"/54 caliber	Mark 39: 3 × single mount

== See also ==
- 5"/54 caliber Mark 42 gun
- 5"/54 caliber Mark 45 gun
