= JDS Harusame (DD-109) =

Murasame-class destroyer

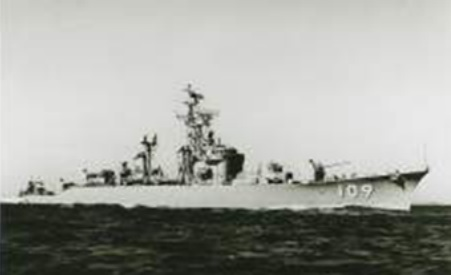
- JDS Harusame

History

Japan
- Name: Harusame; (はるさめ)
- Namesake: Harusame
- Ordered: 1957
- Builder: Mitsubishi Heavy Industries
- Laid down: 17 June 1958
- Launched: 18 June 1959
- Commissioned: 15 December 1959
- Decommissioned: 31 May 1989
- Home port: Maizuru
- Identification: DD-109; ASU-7008
- Fate: Scrapped

General characteristics
- Class & type: Murasame-class destroyer
- Displacement: 1,800 long tons (1,829 t) standard
- Length: 108.0 m (354 ft 4 in)
- Beam: 11.0 m (36 ft 1 in)
- Propulsion: 2 × Steam turbines (15,000ps); 2 × shafts
- Speed: 30 knots (56 km/h; 35 mph)
- Complement: 220
- Armament: 3 × 5-inch/54 caliber Mk.16 guns; 4 × 3-inch/50 caliber Mk.22 guns; 2 × ASW torpedo racks; 1 × Hedgehog anti-submarine mortar; 2 × Y-gun depth charge throwers; 1 × Depth charge rack

JDS Harusame (DD-109) was the third ship of the Murasame-class destroyer of Japan Maritime Self-Defense Force.

== Construction and career ==
Murasame was laid down by Mitsubishi at Kobe in Japan on 17 June 1958, launched on 18 June 1959 and commissioned with the pennant number DD-109 on 15 December 1959. She was incorporated into the Maizuru District Force.

On January 16, 1960, he was transferred to the 10th Escort Corps under the 1st Escort Corps.

On February 1, 1961, the 10th Escort Corps was reorganized into the 2nd Escort Group under the Self-Defense Fleet.

The Maritime Self-Defense Force began research on domestically produced fire control systems in 1959, made prototypes, and conducted practical experiments with Harusame. In 1965, the Mk.63 and Mk.57 fire control systems on the bridge were removed and replaced with prototype fire control systems. After undergoing technical and practical tests on this ship, the 68-type fire control system (GFCS-0 type) was officially adopted in 1968.

In March 1967, the stern depth charge rail and depth charge projector were removed and equipped with VDS (Variable Depth Sonar).

In 1968, participated in a practicing voyage to the ocean.

On March 15, 1969, the 10th Escort Corps was reorganized under the 3rd Escort Corps group.

From August 1 to September 14, 1979, anti-submarine weapons were replaced, the short torpedo launcher was removed, and a 68-type triple short torpedo launcher was installed.

On March 30, 1984, the 10th Escort Corps was abolished and transferred to the 3rd Escort Corps as a ship under direct control.

On March 5, 1985, the type was changed to a special service ship, and the ship registration number was changed to (ASU-7008). It was transferred to the 1st Submarine Group as a ship under direct control.

She was decommissioned on May 31, 1989. In her 29-year history, she has sailed about 660,000 nautical miles, which is equivalent to about 30 laps of the earth.
