= Montana-class battleship =

Proposed class of American super-battleships

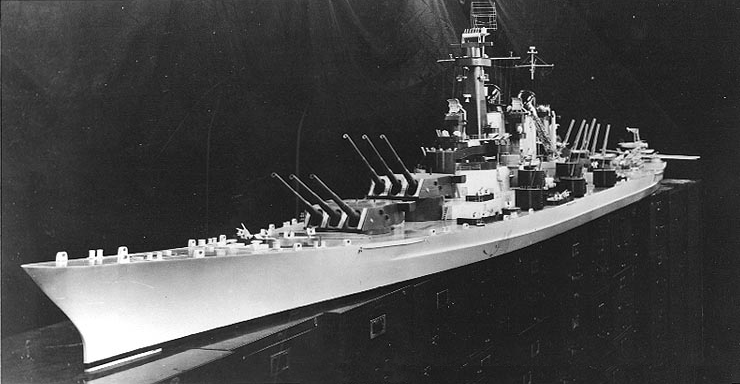
- A model of a Montana-class battleship, 1944

Class overview
- Name: Montana-class battleship
- Operators: United States Navy
- Preceded by: Iowa class
- Planned: 5
- Completed: 0
- Canceled: 5

General characteristics (Design BB67-4)
- Type: Fast battleship
- Displacement: Standard: 63,221 long tons (64,240 t); Full load: 70,965 long tons (72,104 t)
- Length: 921 ft 3 in (280.8 m) loa
- Beam: 121 ft 2 in (36.9 m)
- Draft: 36 ft (11 m)
- Installed power: 8 × Babcock & Wilcox water-tube boilers; 172,000 hp (128 MW)
- Propulsion: 4 × geared steam turbines; 4 × screw propellers
- Speed: 28 knots (32 mph; 52 km/h) maximum
- Range: 15,000 nmi (17,300 mi; 27,800 km) at 15 kn (17 mph; 28 km/h)
- Complement: Standard: 2,355; Flagship: 2,789
- Armament: 12 × 16 in (406 mm)/50 cal Mk 7 guns; 20 × 5 in (127 mm)/54 cal Mark 16 guns; 10–40 × Bofors 40 mm (1.6 in) anti-aircraft guns; 56 × Oerlikon 20 mm (0.79 in) anti-aircraft cannon
- Armor: Main belt: 16.1 inches (409 mm); Bulkheads: 18 inches (457 mm) forward, 15.25 inches (387 mm) aft; Barbettes: 21.3 inches (541 mm), 18 inches (457 mm) aft; Turret face: 22.5 inches (572 mm); Main deck: 7.05–7.35 inches (179–187 mm)
- Aircraft carried: 3 × floatplanes
- Aviation facilities: 2 × aft catapults for launch of seaplanes

The Montana class was a planned set of battleships for the United States Navy. Intended as the successor to the Iowa class, the Montanas were to be slower but larger, better armored, and better armed. Five ships were approved for construction during World War II, but changes in wartime building priorities resulted in their cancellation in favor of continuing production of Essex-class aircraft carriers and Iowa-class battleships.

Armament would have been twelve 16-inch (406 mm) Mark 7 guns in four 3-gun turrets, up from the nine Mark 7 guns in three turrets used by the Iowa class. Unlike the three preceding classes of battleships, the Montana class was designed without any restrictions from treaty limitations. With increased anti-aircraft capability and substantially thicker armor in all areas, the Montanas would have been the largest, best-protected, and most heavily armed US battleships ever, and the only ones to rival Japan's Yamato-class battleships in terms of displacement.

Preliminary design work for the Montana class began before the US entry into World War II. The first two vessels were approved by Congress in 1939 following the passage of the Naval Act of 1938. The Japanese attack on Pearl Harbor delayed the construction of the Montana class. The success of carrier combat at the Battle of the Coral Sea, and to a greater extent the Battle of Midway, diminished the perceived value of the battleship. Consequently, the US Navy first delayed, and later cancelled, the Montana class in favor of more urgently needed aircraft carriers as well as amphibious and anti-submarine vessels.

== Background ==
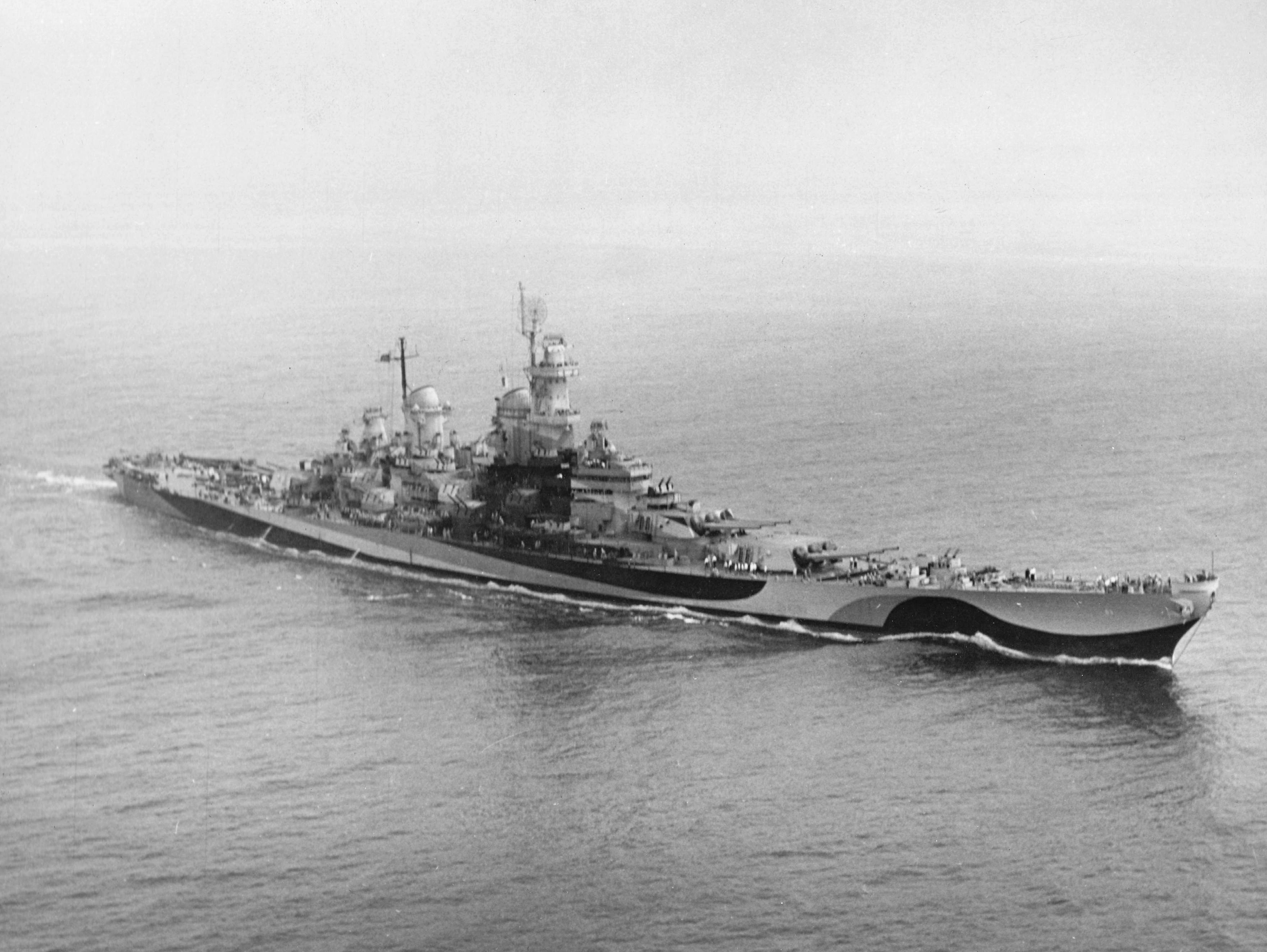
USS Missouri of the Iowa class, the predecessors of the planned Montana class

During the interwar period, the US Navy was primarily concerned with its rival in the Pacific Ocean, the Imperial Japanese Navy. The international naval arms limitation system initiated by the Washington Naval Treaty in 1922 had accorded the US Navy superiority over Japan in terms of total tonnage. After the ten-year construction moratorium that had been imposed by the Washington Treaty expired, the US Navy began building the North Carolina-class fast battleships in 1937 to replace old pre-World War I ships that were by then obsolescent. But by the late 1930s, the Washington system, which had been extended by the First and Second London Naval Treaties, had begun to break down after Japan refused to sign the Second London Treaty in 1936. This prompted the other major naval powers to begin rearmament programs, beginning in the United States with the South Dakota-class battleships in 1938. Funding for the first two new ships was provided in Fiscal Year 1937, though work would not commence until 1939.

The Second Vinson Act of 1938 added two more South Dakotas; it also authorized the construction of two more battleships yet to be designed. The US Navy had already begun design work on the successors to the South Dakotas in 1937, which was to become the Iowa class; the Navy sought larger, faster ships that would handily exceed the 35,000 long tons (36,000 t) limit on battleship displacement imposed under the Washington Treaty system. Because Japan had already refused to abide by the terms of the Second London Naval Treaty, the other major naval powers moved to loosen the restrictions on their own new battleship designs. On 31 March 1938, the US, Britain, and France exchanged notes indicating that they would accept increasing the displacement limit to 45,000 long tons (46,000 t).

As the US Navy's designers worked on proposals for the new ships, two distinct strains emerged: a comparatively slow, heavily armed and armored variant, and a much faster, but lighter-armed and armored vessel that was primarily intended to catch Japanese cruisers and counter the fast Kongō-class battleships. The latter type, which eventually emerged essentially as an improved South Dakota, was capable of a speed of 33 knots (61 km/h; 38 mph), but work on the former proceeded at the same time. The General Board intended it to become the next generation of standard-type battleships, which was to be set at 45,000-ton ships armed with twelve 16 in (406 mm) guns, and capable of 27 knots (50 km/h; 31 mph), the same speed as the South Dakotas.

By 1939, it had become apparent to the naval leadership that war was approaching, and so the need for new ships had become pressing. The start of World War II in Europe, and particularly the Fall of France in June 1940, only increased the pressure to speed construction of new warships. The first two ships ordered to the 33-knot improved South Dakota design—USS Iowa and New Jersey—were ordered under the 1939 fiscal year. The passage of the Two-Ocean Navy Act on 19 July 1940 provided significant increases to the Navy's strength, including an increase of some 385,000 long tons (391,000 t) for battleships alone, along with hundreds of thousands of tons for new aircraft carriers, cruisers, and destroyers. Under the 1941 fiscal year program, the third and fourth Iowa-class battleships were authorized, but in May, two more ships were added to the program. These were to have been built to the next battleship design, but the secretary of the Navy, Frank Knox, decided that these should be additional Iowa-class ships to speed up production.

== Design ==
=== Initial design work ===
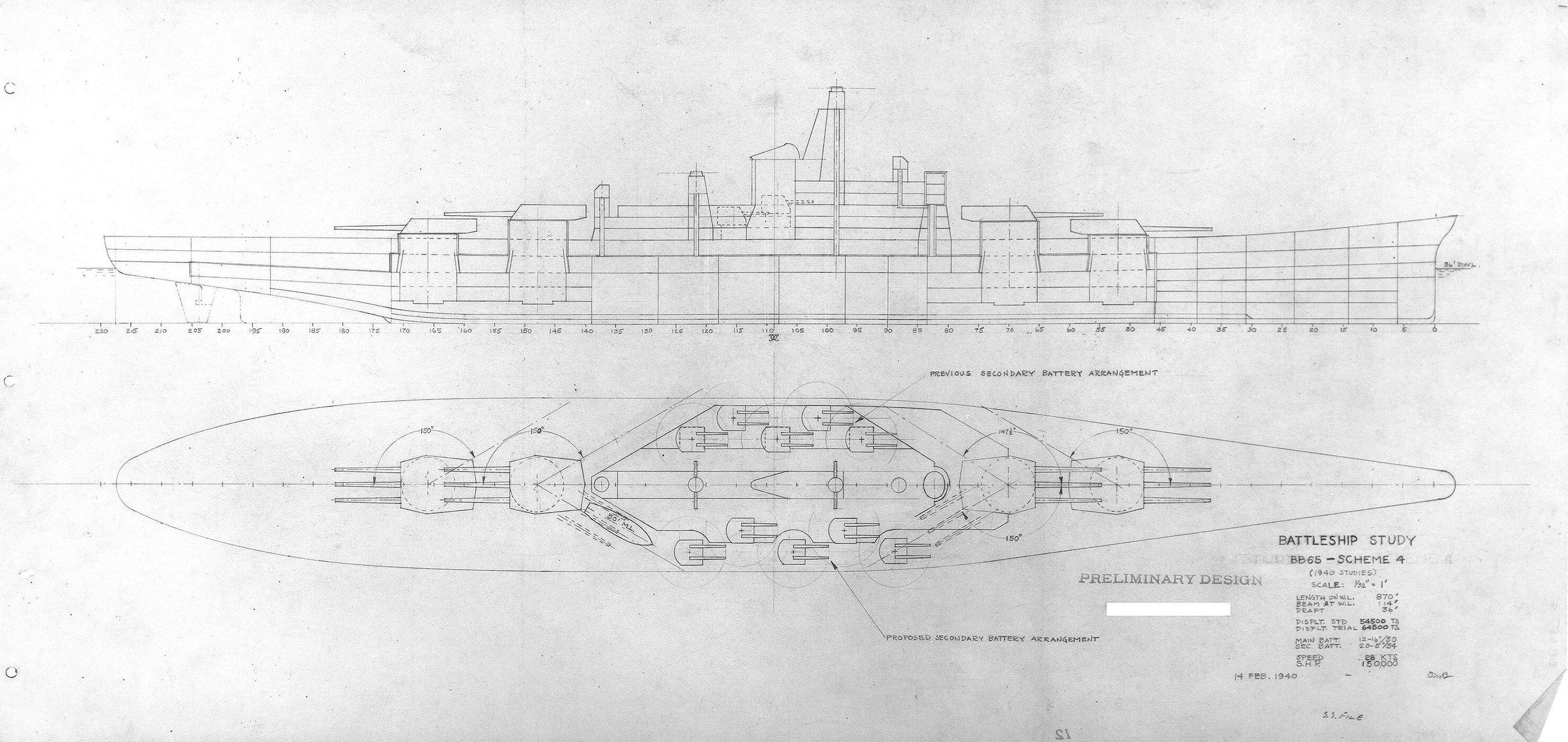
1940 study plan, BB-65 Scheme 4 (BB 65-4)

Though the 33-knot design had been chosen for Iowa, it was clear to naval leadership that these would be exceptions to normal Navy doctrine, and that a reversion to the 27-knot standard-type battleship would occur with the next design. The primary consideration for this new class was the development of the super-heavy 2,700-pound (1,200 kg) armor-piercing shell that had been developed during the construction of the North Carolina class. Standard design practice stated that battleships should be immune to guns of their own calibers at expected battle ranges, but the new super-heavy shell had significantly better penetrating power than older, lighter shells. None of the existing designs, from North Carolina to Iowa, were proof against the 2,700-pound shell, and the General Board wanted the next design to be better protected. They requested proposals from the Bureau of Construction and Repair (C&R) that conformed to the 45,000-ton limit, armed with twelve 16-inch guns, and capable of 27 knots.

C&R initially responded with a design labeled "BB 65A", which used South Dakota as a baseline, but increased the length to accommodate the fourth main battery turret. Displacement was already over the limit at 45,435 long tons (46,164 t), and the ship was only protected against the earlier 2,250 lb (1,020 kg) AP shell. The design staff estimated that more than 2,000 long tons (2,032 t) would be needed to protect the ship against the heavier shells. A second variant, "BB 65B" substituted twelve new 6 in (152 mm)/47 cal guns in place of the existing twenty 5 in (127 mm)/38 cal guns for their secondary batteries, but this increased displacement even further. Another pair of designs, "BB 65C" and "65D", adopted three quadruple main battery turrets instead of four triple turrets, which accounted for some 1,600 long tons (1,626 t) of weight savings. This latter pair mirrored the first set in the use of 5-inch and 6-inch secondaries. All of these designs were only protected against the 2,250 lb shell, but since "C" and "D" were below the displacement limit, C&R attempted to use the free weight to strengthen their armor with design "BB 65E". They realized that though the deck could be improved to provide a relatively narrow zone of immunity against plunging fire, strengthening the belt armor to protect against the heavier shell would increase displacement to as much as 55,000 long tons (56,000 t).

None of the initial proposals was deemed acceptable, and there were concerns about the feasibility of the quadruple turrets. Other guns were suggested, ranging from 18 in (457 mm) guns to experimental 16-inch/56 caliber guns. C&R provided another series of studies beginning with "65F". Several of these proposals experimented with mixed quadruple, triple, and double turrets for either ten or eleven guns to save weight but still increase firepower over the nine-gun South Dakotas. One proposal, "65J", suggested adopting a twelve-gun 14 in (356 mm) ship that would be well-protected against the 2,700 lb AP shell. The 18-inch gun was ruled out after a design study demonstrated that only six of the guns could be mounted within the 45,000-ton displacement limit. By September 1939, one of the ten-gun variants had been selected, which carried two triple-turrets forward and a quadruple turret aft.

=== Wartime designs ===
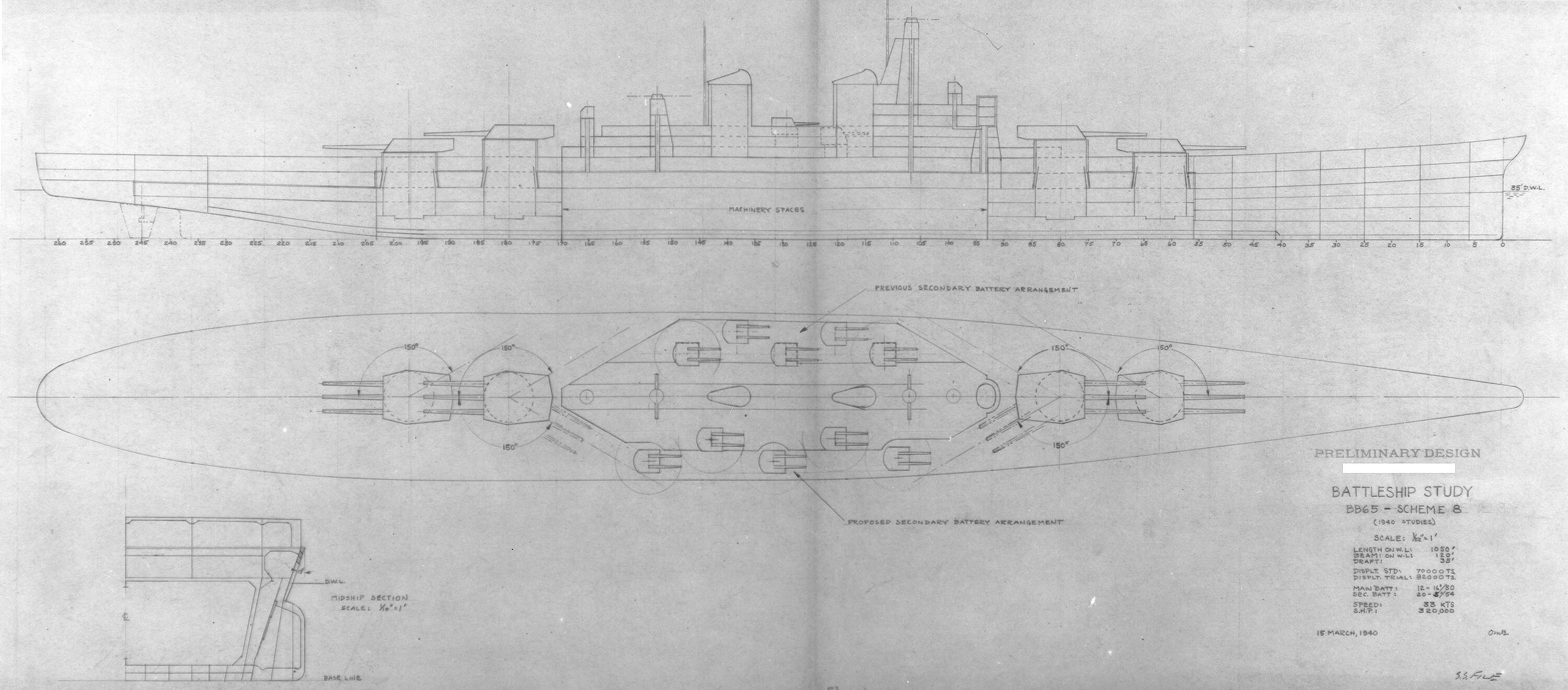
One variant of the fast BB 65-8 design scheme from 1940

The outbreak of World War II in September 1939 radically altered the constraints imposed on C&R. The remaining limits imposed by the Washington and London treaties were now removed entirely; the new ship would only be limited by logistical restrictions of existing naval infrastructure, most significantly the Panama Canal and available dry docks. The Navy had been pushing for a third, wider set of locks for the Panama Canal since 1938, which was approved in 1940. Nevertheless, some limitations still existed; the length and height of the BB65 designs had to take into account one of the shipyards at which they were to be built: the New York Navy Yard slipways could not handle the construction of a ship more than 58,000 long tons (59,000 t), and vessels built there had to be low enough to clear the Brooklyn Bridge at low tide. Consequently, the yard's number 4 dry dock had to be enlarged and the ships would be floated out rather than conventionally launched. In October, the General Board asked for new twelve-gun designs that were sufficiently armored, which was estimated could be accomplished on a displacement of around 50,000 long tons (51,000 t). The Preliminary Design department at C&R responded with a design in mid-January 1940 that largely met the General Board's requirements, but displacement was set at 51,500 long tons (52,300 t). An option to replace the standard 5-inch/38 secondaries with longer-barrel 5-inch/54 guns would add about 2,000 long tons (2,032 t) to the ships.

During a meeting on 16 February 1940, the Board requested a new series of proposals. These included a modified version of the nine-gun Iowa design that was two knots slower but better protected, an enlarged Iowa variant that maintained the 33-knot speed but displaced 53,500 long tons (54,400 t), and several twelve-gun designs that had speeds ranging from 28 to 33 knots. These were given designations from "BB 65-1" to "BB 65-8". Displacement on these proposals increased to as much as 67,000 long tons (68,000 t). All of these designs were armed with the 16-inch/50 gun, and were well protected against the super-heavy shell. During discussions in March, the decision was made to revert to externally applied belt armor, since the internal armor belts of the South Dakota and Iowa classes were more difficult to install and repair in the event of battle damage, and the weight savings associated with them no longer mattered now that displacement limits were gone. Two additional designs were produced in June: 65-9 and 65-10, which were 28-knot ships.

By July, Navy's senior leadership still could not agree on design priorities, and disagreed sharply on points ranging from top speed to the cost and logistical challenges of the larger designs. The Board requested another round of design studies from Preliminary Design, which responded with nine-, ten-, and twelve-gun ships that, again, included slow and fast variants. The Board finally selected one of the designs, "BB 65-5A", which was armed with twelve guns on a displacement of 57,500 long tons (58,400 t), and capable of 28 knots. The Board submitted the design to Knox, which he approved on 19 August. The ships were not actually authorized at that point, and design work continued. Because the battleships that would have received the BB-65 and BB-66 hull numbers had been assigned to the Iowa class, the next design was labeled "BB 67-1". This design shortened the hull to 880 ft (270 m) at the waterline, likely to keep the length within the limits of the new slipways being built at the Norfolk Navy Yard and the Philadelphia Navy Yard. This variant displacement increased to 61,200 long tons (62,200 t). Further iterative improvements of the armor layout produced "BB 67-2", which had a slightly reduced displacement of 59,700 long tons (60,700 t). This version incorporated an internal lower belt that provided additional protection against underwater shell hits.

Detail work on the design continued well into 1941, which included replacing the original battery of light anti-aircraft guns, which were to be the ineffective 1.1 in (28 mm) guns with Bofors 40 mm (1.6 in) guns. The searchlights were rearranged, the navigational rangefinders were removed, and the waterline hull length was increased slightly to 890 ft (270 m). Displacement was increased slightly, to 60,500 long tons (61,500 t), while the designers discovered that the propulsion system could be reduced in power, from 212,000 to 172,000 shaft horsepower (158,000 to 128,000 kW), which allowed smaller and lighter propulsion machinery. These changes provided further savings in weight that allowed the bomb deck to be extended further aft, and improvements to the light anti-aircraft battery. Protection of the propulsion shafts also changed from an extension of the belt and main armored deck aft of the citadel to armored tubes around the shafts, with the steering gears becoming its own armored compartment. This design was immune to the super-heavy shells when fired at ranges between 18,000 and 31,000 yards (16,000 and 28,000 m); their resistance to standard 16-inch AP shells extended to 16,500 and 34,500 yards (15,100 and 31,500 m). The final version of the design, dated March 1941, was designated "BB 67-4".

== Construction and cancellation ==
Line drawing of a Montana-class battleship

The General Board planned to build four ships to the new design, which would have constituted a single battleship division, but five were authorized by the Two-Ocean Navy Act on 19 July 1940. Work was intended to begin later that year, but shortages of the necessary steel caused delays. Work on the new locks for the Panama Canal was also halted in 1941, owing to a shortage of steel due to changing strategic and material priorities. The final contract design was issued in June 1942. Construction was authorized by the United States Congress and the projected date of completion was estimated to be somewhere between 1 July and 1 November 1945.

In October 1942, work on the ships was again delayed by the order of some eighty destroyers, which were badly needed for the Battle of the Atlantic against German U-boats that were raiding the supply convoys to Britain. Additional work on the design continued into 1942, including detail work on the anti-aircraft batteries to be carried. The Bureau of Ships suggested the armor decks could be increased in thickness, but these changes were not pursued. All five ships were ultimately cancelled on 21 July 1943, as production priorities had shifted decisively toward aircraft carriers, destroyers, and submarines. The time spent refining the Montana design was not entirely a waste, as the arrangement of the propulsion system was modified for the Midway-class aircraft carriers.

== Specifications ==
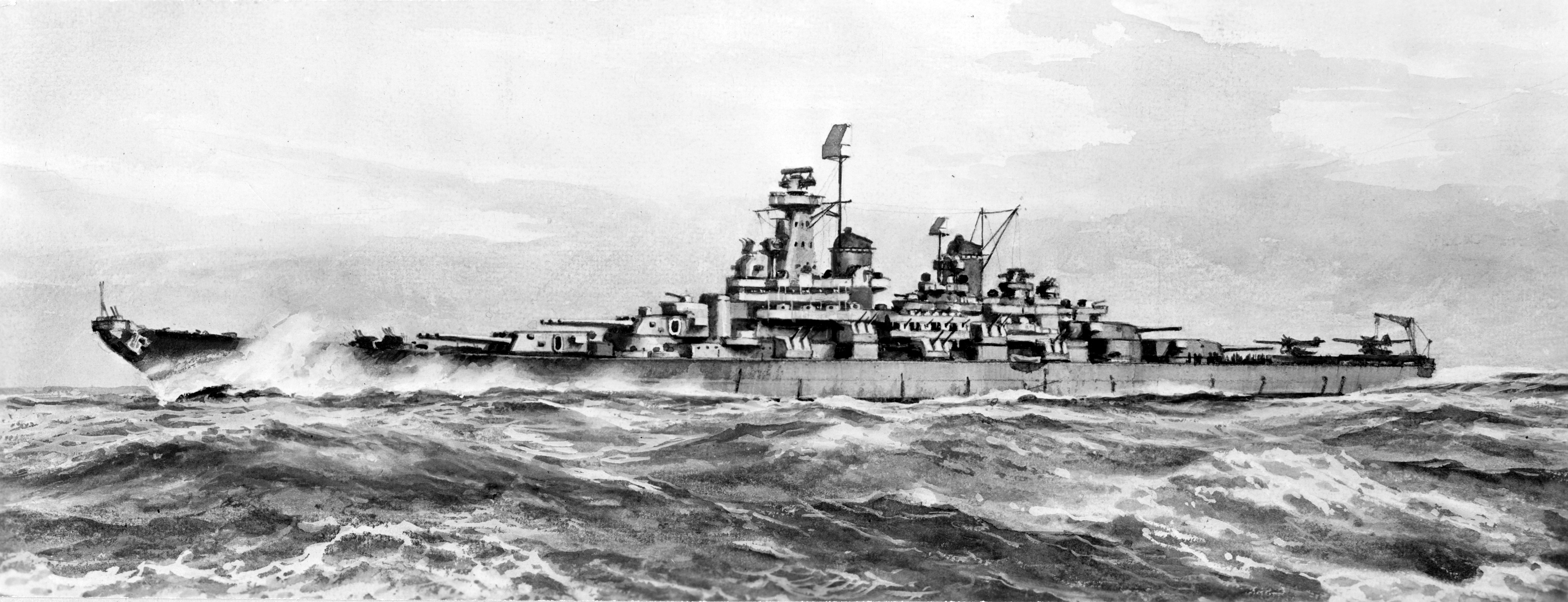
An artist's impression of the Montana class

=== General characteristics ===
As authorized, the Montana-class ships (design "BB 67-4") would have been 890 ft (270 m) long at the waterline and 921 ft 3 in (280.80 m) long overall. At the waterline, their beam was to have been 115 ft (35 m), but their maximum beam increased to 121 ft 2 in (36.93 m). The ships were to have had a standard displacement of 60,500 long tons (61,500 t), with a designed trials displacement of 68,317 long tons (69,413 t). Full load displacement increased to 70,965 long tons (72,104 t), and emergency load grew further to 71,922 long tons (73,076 t). At their standard displacement, the ships would have had a draft of 35 ft (11 m), while at emergency load, the draft increased to 36 ft 10 in (11.23 m). The ships would have had a metacentric height of 8.2 feet (2.5 m). Their projected crew was to have amounted to 115 officers and 2,240 enlisted men; this grew to 189 officers and 2,789 enlisted men while serving as a flagship.

The Montana design shares many characteristics with the previous classes of American fast battleships starting from the North Carolina class, such as a bulbous bow, a triple bottom under the armored citadel, and twin skegs in which the inner shafts were housed. The Montanas' overall construction would have made extensive use of welding for joining structural plates and homogeneous armor, which saved weight compared to traditional riveting. Like all of the US interwar designs, the Montanas would have had a flush main deck that was steeply flared at the bow to reduce the amount of water taken on in heavy seas. The Montana class would have carried three aircraft for reconnaissance and gunnery spotting. They would have been operated from catapults on the ship's fantail, as was standard for US battleship designs of the period.

=== Propulsion ===
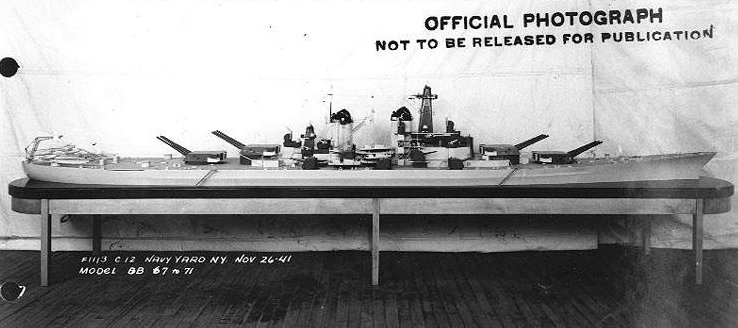
Model of the Montana class

The propulsion plant of the Montanas would have consisted of eight oil-fired Babcock & Wilcox two-drum boilers with a steam pressure of 565 psi (3,900 kPa) and a steam temperature of 850 °F (454 °C). The boilers supplied steam to four geared steam turbines, each driving one screw propeller. The boilers were vented through a pair of funnels placed on the centerline amidships. To meet the high electrical loads anticipated for the ships, the design was to have ten 1,250 kW ship service turbogenerators (SSTG), providing a total of 12,500 kW of non-emergency electrical power at 450 volts alternating current. The ships were also to be equipped with two 500 kW emergency diesel generators.

The turbines were rated to produce 43,000 hp (32 MW) each, for a total propulsive power of 172,000 hp (128 MW). The propulsion system was intended to produce a design speed of 28 knots at 70,500 tons displacement. The Montanas were designed to carry 7,500 long tons (7,600 t) of fuel oil and had a nominal range of 15,000 nmi (27,800 km; 17,300 mi) at 15 kn (28 km/h; 17 mph). Two semi-balanced rudders were placed behind the two inboard propellers. The inboard shafts were housed in skegs, which, while increasing hydrodynamic drag, substantially strengthened the stern structure.

While less powerful than the 212,000 hp (158,000 kW) powerplant used by the Iowas, the Montana's plant enabled the machinery spaces to be considerably more subdivided, with extensive longitudinal and traverse subdivisions of the boiler and engine rooms. The machinery arrangement was similar to that of the Lexington class, with the boiler rooms flanking the two central turbine rooms for the inboard shafts, while the turbine rooms for the wing shafts were placed at the after end of the machinery spaces. Montana's machinery arrangement combined with increased power would eventually be used on the Midway class.

=== Armament ===
Cutaway of a 16-inch gun turret

The primary armament of a Montana-class battleship would have been twelve 16-inch (406 mm)/50 caliber Mark 7 guns, which were to be mounted in four three-gun turrets. The turrets were placed in two superfiring pairs, one forward and one aft. The guns fired two types of shells: a 2,700 lb (1,200 kg) armor-piercing shells and 1,900 lb (860 kg) high capacity (HC) shells that carried a larger high-explosive bursting charge. The shells had muzzle velocities of 2,500 ft/s (760 m/s) and 2,690 ft/s (820 m/s), respectively. Firing AP shells at the maximum elevation of 45 degrees, the guns could reach targets out to 42,345 yd (38,720 m), while the lighter HC shells had a slightly reduced range of 41,604 yd (38,043 m). The shells had a flight time in excess of eighty seconds at those distances. At a realistic engagement distance of 20,000 yd (18,000 m), the AP shells could penetrate 20 in (508 mm) of steel armor. The guns had a rate of fire of two shots per minute, and had a rate of train of four degrees per second. They had to be returned to 5 degrees elevation for reloading.

The secondary armament for the Montana-class ships was to be twenty 5 in (127 mm)/54 cal Mark 16 dual-purpose guns housed in ten two-gun turrets along the superstructure. These guns, designed for the Montana class, were intended to improve the effective range over the shorter-barreled Mark 12 guns then in service. They fired a 70 lb (32 kg) projectile at a muzzle velocity of 2,650 ft/s (810 m/s) and had a maximum range of 25,909 yd (23,691 m) against surface targets and a maximum ceiling of 51,600 ft (15,700 m) against aerial targets. The guns had a rate of fire of fifteen shots per minute.

Each ship would have carried a light anti-aircraft armament of thirty-two 40 mm (1.6 in) Bofors guns and twenty 20 mm (0.79 in) Oerlikon guns. The Bofors guns were to be carried in eight quadruple mounts, while the Oerlikons were to have been mounted individually, although the number of Bofors and Oerlikon mounts would likely have increased considerably had the ships been built. The Bofors guns fired 1.98 lb (0.90 kg) shells at a velocity of 2,890 ft/s (880 m/s), and they had a maximum ceiling of 22,800 ft (6,900 m). The Oerlikon guns were supplied with .27 lb (0.12 kg) shells, which they fired with a muzzle velocity of 2,740 to 2,770 ft/s (840 to 840 m/s).

=== Armor ===
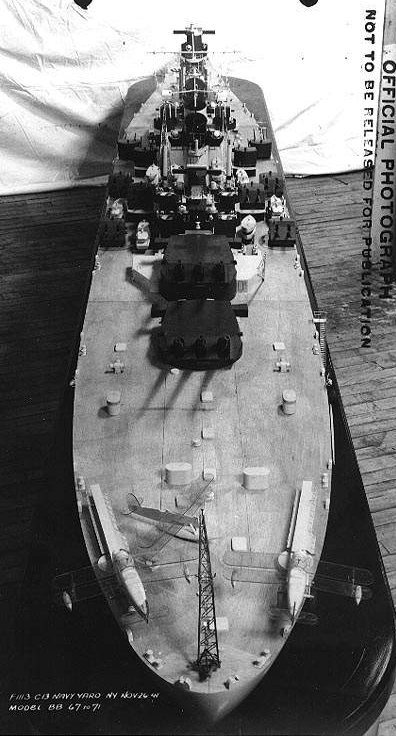
Stern view of a Montana-class battleship model

As designed, the Montanas used the "all or nothing" armor philosophy, with most of the armor concentrated on the citadel that includes the machinery spaces, armament, magazines, and command and control facilities. The belt armor would be 16.1 in (409 mm) Class A face-hardened Krupp cemented (K.C.) armor mounted on 1 in (25 mm) Special Treatment Steel (STS), inclined at 19 degrees. Below the waterline, the belt tapered to 10.2 in (259 mm). To protect against potential underwater shell hits, the ships would have a separate Class B homogeneous Krupp-type armor lower belt, 8.5 in (216 mm) by the magazines and 7.2 in (183 mm) by the machinery, that would also have served as one of the torpedo bulkheads, inclined at 10 degrees; this lower belt would taper to 1 inch at the triple bottom and be mounted on 0.75 in (19 mm) STS. The ends of the armored citadel would be closed by Class A traverse bulkheads 18 in (457 mm) thick in the front and 15.25 in (387 mm) in the aft.

The deck armor would be in three layers: the first consisting of 0.75 in (19 mm) STS laminated on 1.5 in (38 mm) STS for a total of 2.25 in (57 mm) STS weather deck, the second consisting of 5.8 in (147 mm) Class B laminated on 1.25 in (32 mm) STS for a total of 7.05 in (179 mm), and a third 0.625 in (16 mm) splinter deck. Over the magazines, the splinter deck would be replaced by a 1 in (25 mm) STS third deck to protect from spalling. Total armor thickness on the centerline would therefore have been 9.925 in (252 mm) over the citadel and 10.3 in (262 mm) thick over the magazines. The outboard section would have had 6.1 in (155 mm) Class B laminated on 1.25 in (32 mm) STS for a total of 7.35 in (187 mm) second deck and a 0.75 in (19 mm) splinter deck. The total thickness for the outboard section of the deck would have been 8.1 in (206 mm).

The main batteries were designed to have very heavy protection, with turret faces having 18 in (457 mm) Class B mounted on 4.5 in (114 mm) STS, resulting in 22.5 in (572 mm) thick laminated plate. The turret sides were to have up to 10 in (254 mm) Class A and turret roofs would have 9.15 in (232 mm) Class B. The barbettes would have been protected by up to 21.3 in (541 mm) Class A forward and 18 in (457 mm) aft, while the conning tower sides would have 18 in (457 mm) Class A.

Montana's torpedo protection system design incorporated lessons learned from those of previous US fast battleships, and was to consist of four internal longitudinal torpedo bulkheads behind the outer hull shell plating that would form a multi-layered "bulge". Two of the compartments would be liquid loaded in order to disrupt the gas bubble of a torpedo warhead detonation while the bulkheads would elastically deform and absorb the energy. Due to the external armor belt, the geometry of the "bulge" was more similar to that of the North Carolina class rather than that of the South Dakota and Iowa classes. The design of the Montana's torpedo defense system addressed a potential vulnerability of the South Dakota–type system, where caisson tests in 1939 showed that extending a main armor belt that tapers to the keel to act as one of the torpedo bulkheads had detrimental flooding effects due to the belt's rigidity. South Dakota's and Iowa's systems were modified in light of these tests, and Iowa's system was also further reinforced. Like on the South Dakota and Iowa classes, the two outer compartments would be liquid loaded, while two inner ones be void with the lower Class B armor belt to form the holding bulkhead between them. The greater beam of the Montanas would allow a higher system depth of 20.5 ft (6.25 m) compared to 18.5 ft (5.64 m) of the North Carolinas.

== Ships ==
Construction data
| Ship name | Hull no. | Builder | Authorization | Suspension | Cancellation |
|---|---|---|---|---|---|
| Montana | BB-67 | Philadelphia Navy Yard, Philadelphia, Pennsylvania | 19 July 1940 | April 1942 | 21 July 1943 |
| Ohio | BB-68 | Philadelphia Navy Yard, Philadelphia, Pennsylvania | 19 July 1940 | April 1942 | 21 July 1943 |
| Maine | BB-69 | New York Navy Yard, New York City, New York | 19 July 1940 | April 1942 | 21 July 1943 |
| New Hampshire | BB-70 | New York Navy Yard, New York City, New York | 19 July 1940 | April 1942 | 21 July 1943 |
| Louisiana | BB-71 | Norfolk Navy Yard, Norfolk, Virginia | 19 July 1940 | April 1942 | 21 July 1943 |

== See also ==
- Maximum battleship – an unrelated series of designs produced at the request of US Senator Benjamin Tillman in the 1910s and 1920s
