= Murasame-class destroyer (1958) =

Japanese warship class (1958–89)

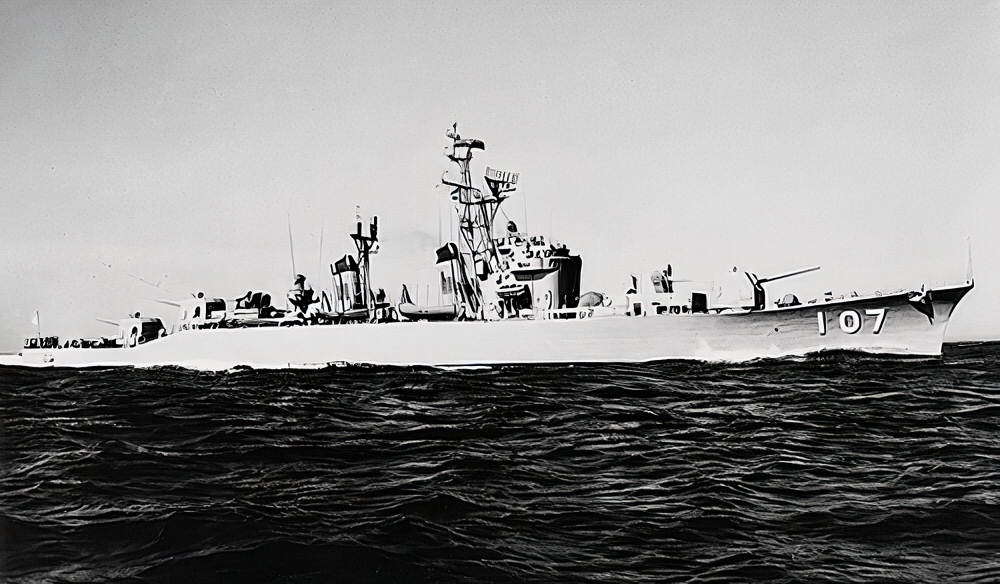
- Murasame (DD-107)

Class overview
- Name: Murasame class
- Builders: Mitsubishi Heavy Industries; Nagasaki Shipyard (1); Uraga Dock Company (1); Ishikawajima Heavy Industries (1)
- Operators: Japan Maritime Self-Defense Force
- Preceded by: Ayanami class
- Succeeded by: Akizuki class
- In service: 1958–1989
- Completed: 3
- Retired: 3

General characteristics
- Type: Destroyer
- Displacement: 1,800 long tons (1,829 t) standard
- Length: 108.0 m (354 ft 4 in)
- Beam: 11.0 m (36 ft 1 in)
- Propulsion: 2 × Steam turbines (15,000ps); 2 × shafts
- Speed: 30 knots (56 km/h; 35 mph)
- Complement: 220
- Sensors & processing systems: Mark 57 fire-control system; Mark 63 fire-control system
- Armament: 3 × 5-inch/54 caliber Mk.16 guns; 4 × 3-inch/50 caliber Mk.22 guns; 2 × ASW torpedo racks; 1 × Hedgehog anti-submarine mortar; 2 × Y-gun depth charge throwers; 1 × Depth charge rack

The Murasame-class destroyer was a destroyer class built for the Japan Maritime Self-Defense Force (JMSDF) in the late 1950s as a successor to the Ayanami-class destroyers. Like its predecessor, its main task was anti-submarine warfare, but its improved weaponry also enabled it to perform better in the anti-air role, so this class was classified as "DDA" (anti-air destroyer or all purpose destroyer) unofficially.

== Design ==
Like its predecessor, the Ayanami class, this class adopted a "long forecastle" design with inclined afterdeck called "Holland Slope", named after the scenic sloping street in Nagasaki City. The propulsion system was almost the same as that of the Harukaze class.

The sensor suite and weapon system was almost the same as that of the latter batch of the Ayanami class, but three 5-inch/54 caliber Mark 16 guns (with Mark 39 single mounts) were added to extend effective range against air and surface threats in addition to four 3-inch/50 caliber Mark 22 guns (with Mark 33 dual mounts). The 5-inch guns were controlled by one Mark 57 GFCS, and the 3-inch guns were done by one Mark 63 controller. The main air-search radar was an OPS-1, the Japanese version of the American AN/SPS-6.

== Ships ==
Hull No.	Name	Launched	Struck
DD-107	Murasame	31 July 1958	23 March 1988
DD-108	Yūdachi	31 July 1958	1987
DD-109	Harusame	18 June 1959	May 1989
