= JDS Yūdachi (DD-108) =

Murasame-class destroyer

History

Japan
- Name: Yūdachi; (ゆうだち)
- Namesake: Yūdachi (1936)
- Ordered: 1958
- Builder: Mitsubishi Heavy Industries
- Laid down: 16 December 1957
- Launched: 29 July 1958
- Commissioned: 25 March 1959
- Decommissioned: 30 March 1987
- Home port: Maizuru
- Identification: DD-108; ASU-7007
- Fate: Scrapped

General characteristics
- Class & type: Murasame-class destroyer
- Displacement: 1,800 long tons (1,829 t) standard
- Length: 108.0 m (354 ft 4 in)
- Beam: 11.0 m (36 ft 1 in)
- Propulsion: 2 × Steam turbines (15,000ps); 2 × shafts
- Speed: 30 knots (56 km/h; 35 mph)
- Complement: 220
- Armament: 3 × 5-inch/54 caliber Mk.16 guns; 4 × 3-inch/50 caliber Mk.22 guns; 2 × ASW torpedo racks; 1 × Hedgehog anti-submarine mortar; 2 × Y-gun depth charge throwers; 1 × Depth charge rack

JDS Yūdachi (DD-108) was the second ship of the Murasame-class destroyer of Japan Maritime Self-Defense Force.

== Construction and career ==
Yūdachi was laid down by Mitsubishi at Kobe in Japan on 16 December 1957, launched on 29 July 1958 and commissioned with the pennant number DD-108 on 25 March 1959. She was incorporated into the Maizuru District Force.

On September 25, 1959, the 10th Escort Corps was reorganized under the 1st Escort Corps group.

On February 1, 1961, the 10th Escort Corps was reorganized into the 2nd Escort Group under the Self-Defense Fleet.

Replaced sonar in 1962.

Participated in practicing ocean voyages in 1965 and 1967.

On March 15, 1969, the 10th Escort Corps was reorganized under the 3rd Escort Corps group.

On March 30, 1984, the 10th Escort Corps was abolished, the type was changed to a special service ship, and the ship registration number was changed to (ASU-7007). Transferred to the Maizuru District Force as a ship under direct control.

In 1974, the sonar was replaced for the second time.

Decommissioned on March 24, 1987.
