= 893 Naval Air Squadron =

Inactive flying squadron of the Royal Navy's Fleet Air Arm

- Squadron badge
- Active: 1942–1943; 1956–1960; 1960–1965; 1965–1970
- Disbanded: 14 July 1970
- Country: United Kingdom
- Branch: Royal Navy
- Type: Single-seat fighter squadron
- Role: Carrier-based fighter squadron
- Part of: Fleet Air Arm
- Home station: See Naval air stations section for full list.
- Mottos: Saepe feriendum (Latin for 'Strike often')
- Engagements: World War II: Operation Torch; Operation Husky; Operation Avalanche; Suez Crisis: Operation Musketeer
- Battle honours: Arctic 1941-45; North Africa 1943; Sicily 1943; Salerno 1943

Insignia
- Squadron Badge Description: Party per pale wory blue and black, a base barry wavy of six white and bive overall a flash of lightning sinister chief winged gold striking the water in dexter base (1944)
- Identification Markings: 09A+ (Martlet on Formidable for Operation Torch); 9A+ (Martlet later); 090-099 (Sea Venom); 457-469 (Sea Venom September 1957); 255-259 (Sea Venom 1960); 455-464 (Sea Vixen FAW.1); 244-257 (Sea Vixen FAW.2)
- Fin Carrier Codes: O (Sea Venom); O:V:A:R (Sea Venom September 1957); V (Sea Venom 1960); R:C:V (Sea Vixen FAW.1); V:H (Sea Vixen FAW.2)

Aircraft flown
- Fighter: Fairey Fulmar; Grumman Martlet; de Havilland Sea Venom; de Havilland Sea Vixen

893 Naval Air Squadron (893 NAS), otherwise referred to as 893 Squadron, was a Fleet Air Arm (FAA) naval air squadron of the United Kingdom’s Royal Navy (RN). It most recently operated de Havilland Sea Vixen carrier-based fleet air-defence fighter aircraft, between August 1960 and July 1970.

The squadron was established as a fighter unit in June 1942. By October it was operating on the aircraft carrier HMS Formidable. The squadron provided air support for Operation Torch. It participated in the invasion of Sicily in July 1943 and the landings at Salerno in September 1943, but was disbanded in November.

The squadron was reformed in February 1956. Due to the Suez crisis, it expanded by absorbing 890 Naval Air Squadron. In December, it expanded further by taking in some aircraft from 892 Naval Air Squadron. It became the first squadron to equip de Havilland Sea Venom aircraft with Firestreak missiles, but disbanded in February 1960.

In August 1960, 893 Naval Air Squadron was reformed for HMS Hermes. During the Kuwait crisis in June 1961 it was on HMS Centaur and in August 1963 it moved to HMS Victorious for a long deployment in the Far East. During rising tensions with Indonesia, the squadron was at RAF Tengah from June to August 1964, however, the squadron disbanded in July 1965. It was reformed in November and six months later boarded HMS Victorious, serving in the Far East from July 1966 to March 1967. It moved to Cyprus in April 1968 and in May joined HMS Hermes for the Far East. The squadron was later in the Mediterranean, but disbanded in July 1970.

Throughout its history 893 NAS has operated Fulmars, Martlets, Sea Venoms and Sea Vixens.

== History ==
=== Single-seat fighter squadron (1942-1943) ===
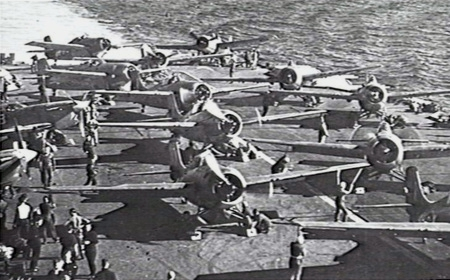
Grumman Martlet of 893 NAS on HMS Formidable off Salerno 1943

893 Naval Air Squadron was first stood up at RNAS Donibristle (HMS Merlin), Fife, Scotland, on 15 June 1942 equipped with Grumman Martlet fighter aircraft and supplemented by a number of Fairey Fulmar fighter aircraft. The original plan was for deployment on the Long Island-class escort carrier, HMS Archer; however, it ultimately served on the Illustrious-class aircraft carrier, HMS Formidable, where it was equipped with ten Grumman Martlet Mk IV in October. This arrangement facilitated fighter patrols during Operation Torch, the North African landings. Throughout the subsequent months, patrols continued in the Mediterranean region. In July 1943, fighter cover focused on the Allied landings in Sicily, Operation Husky, while a comparable operation was conducted for the Salerno Landings, Operation Avalanche, in September. On 18 October, the squadron returned to RNAS Machrihanish (HMS Landrail), Argyll and Bute, Scotland and subsequently re-embarked to provide support for an Arctic convoy. The squadron was disbanded on 18 November, shortly following its return.

=== All-weather fighter squadron (1956-1960) ===
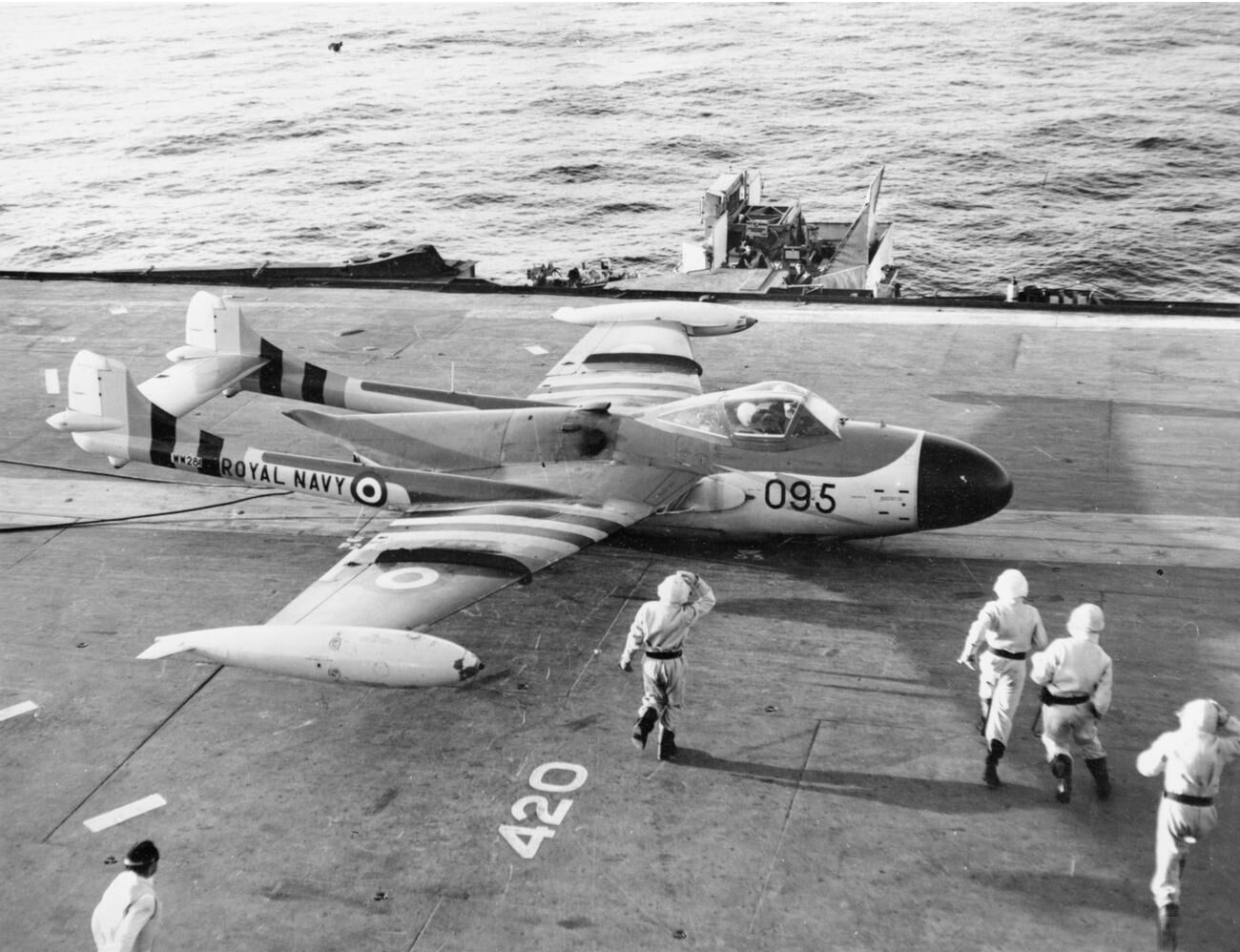
de Havilland Sea Venom of 893 NAS after landing on HMS Eagle with no undercarriage

893 Naval Air Squadron was re established as an all-weather fighter unit at RNAS Yeovilton (HMS Heron), Somerset, England, in February 1956, initially equipped with six de Havilland Sea Venom FAW.21 jet fighter aircraft, designated for HMS Ark Royal. However, the onset of the Suez Crisis necessitated a revision of these plans, leading to an expansion in June when the squadron grew to nine aircraft through the incorporation of 890 Naval Air Squadron. Subsequently, in December, 893 Naval Air Squadron further augmented its strength by integrating several aircraft from 892 Naval Air Squadron, thereby enhancing its operational capabilities from the Audacious-class aircraft carrier, HMS Eagle. In February 1957, the unit was assigned to HMS Ark Royal while operating in the Mediterranean, with additional deployments in Home waters and the Atlantic. Subsequently, in September 1958, the squadron transferred to Illustrious-class aircraft carrier, HMS Victorious, also stationed in the Mediterranean. The squadron distinguished itself as the first to operate de Havilland Sea Venom aircraft armed with Firestreak infrared homing (heat seeking) air-to-air missile, undergoing re-equipment with FAW.22 Sea Vixen variant in January 1959. The squadron was officially disbanded at RNAS Yeovilton (HMS Heron) on 29 February 1960.

=== Sea Vixen (1960-1970) ===
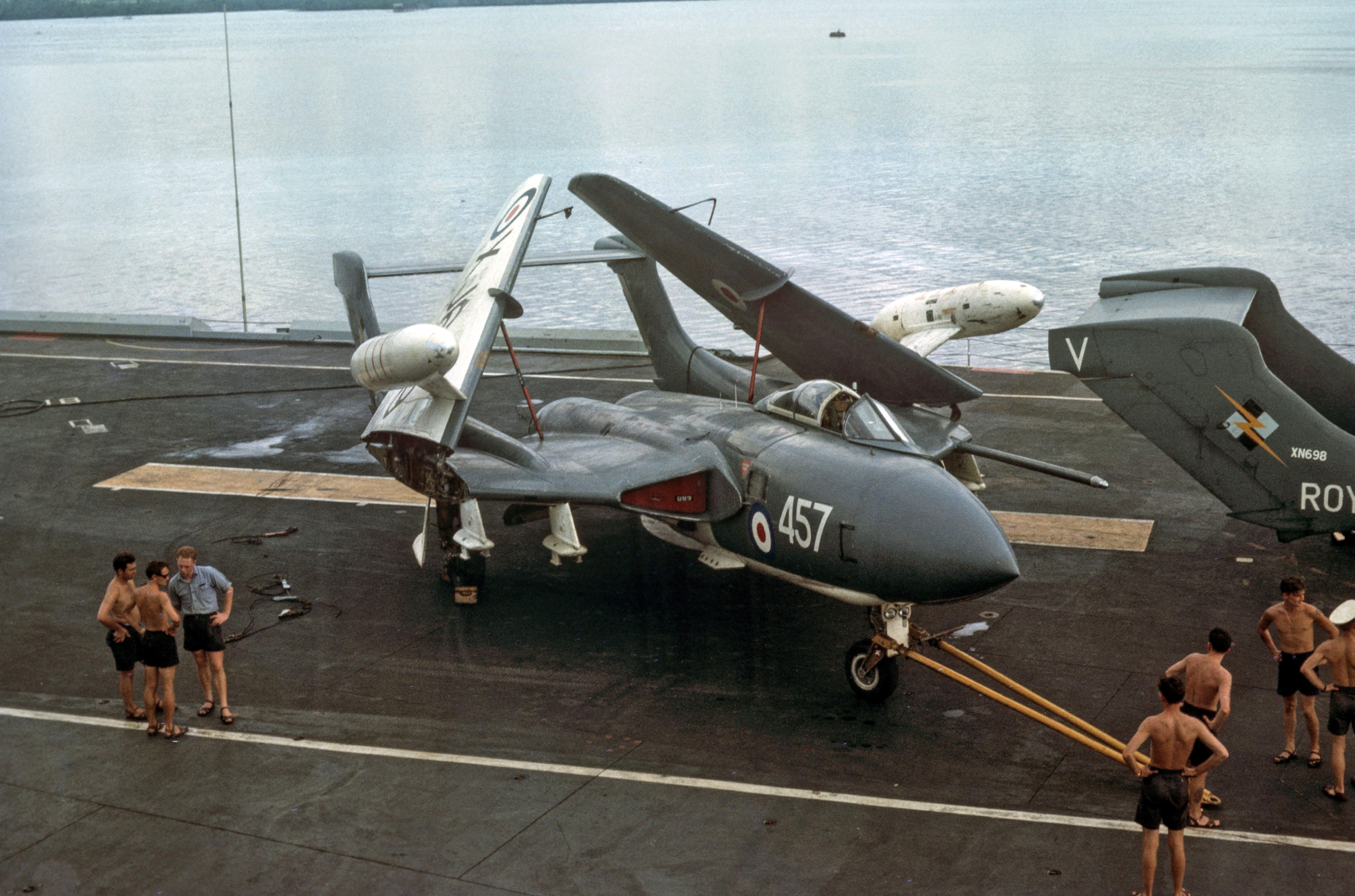
893 NAS on HMS Victorious in Singapore ~December 1964

In August 1960, 893 Naval Air Squadron was reformed at RNAS Yeovilton (HMS Heron), equipped with six de Havilland Sea Vixen FAW.1 jet fighter aircraft. The squadron's first detachment was to the Centaur-class aircraft carrier, HMS Hermes prior to its commissioning on 1 September. Subsequently, the squadron flew to join HMS Ark Royal near Malta in November. By the time of the Kuwait crisis in June 1961, the squadron was aboard the lead ship of her class, HMS Centaur, and it later operated in both the Far East and the Mediterranean regions before transferring to HMS Victorious in August 1963. This vessel then embarked on an extended deployment to the Far East, which included stops in Hong Kong, Japan, the Philippines, and Australia. During a period of heightened tensions with Indonesia, the squadron was placed on alert and disembarked at RAF Tengah, Singapore, from June to August 1964 while the ship underwent refitting in HMNB Singapore. Upon returning to the United Kingdom, the squadron was disbanded at RNAS Yeovilton in July 1965.

The squadron, equipped with eleven de Havilland Sea Vixen FAW.2 aircraft, was re established at RNAS Yeovilton (HMS Heron) in November 1965 and subsequently embarked on HMS Victorious six months later. Following a deployment to the Far East from July 1966 to March 1967, the squadron returned to the United Kingdom before detaching to Cyprus in April 1968. In May, 893 Naval Air Squadron joined HMS Hermes for another expedition to the Far East. The squadron also spent time operating in the Mediterranean; however, it was disbanded on 14 July 1970.

== Aircraft flown ==
Types of aircraft flown by 893 Naval Air Squadron include:

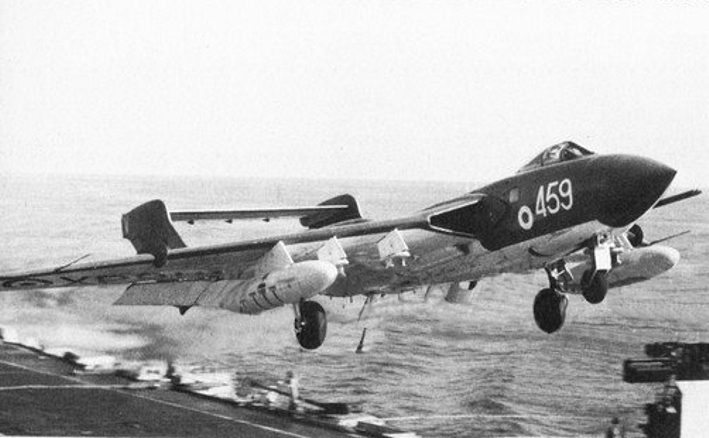
de Havilland Sea Vixen FAW.1 from 893 Naval Air Squadron

- Fairey Fulmar Mk.I reconnaissance/fighter aircraft (June - September 1942)
- Grumman Martlet Mk I fighter aircraft (June - October 1942)
- Grumman Martlet Mk II fighter aircraft (September - October 1942)
- Grumman Martlet Mk IV fighter aircraft (October 1942 - November 1943)
- de Havilland Sea Venom FAW.21 jet fighter-bomber (February 1956 - January 1959)
- de Havilland Sea Venom FAW.22 jet fighter-bomber (January 1959 - February 1960)
- de Havilland Sea Vixen FAW.1 jet fighter aircraft (September 1960 - July 1965)
- de Havilland Sea Vixen FAW.2 jet fighter aircraft (November 1965 - July 1970)

== Battle honours ==
The battle honours awarded to 893 Naval Air Squadron are:

- Arctic 1941-1945
- North Africa 1942-43
- Sicily 1943
- Salerno 1943

== Naval air stations and aircraft carriers ==
893 Naval Air Squadron operated from a number of naval air stations of the Royal Navy, also a number of Royal Navy fleet carriers and escort carriers and other airbases overseas:

1942 - 1943

- Royal Naval Air Station Donibristle (HMS Merlin) (15 June - 23 August 1942)
  - HMS Archer (Detachment two aircraft 1 - 13 July 1942)
- Royal Naval Air Station St Merryn (HMS Vulture) (23 August - 9 September 1942)
- Royal Naval Air Station Charlton Horethorne (HMS Heron II) (9 September - 6 October 1942)
- Royal Naval Air Station Hatston (HMS Sparrowhawk) (6 - 21 October 1942)

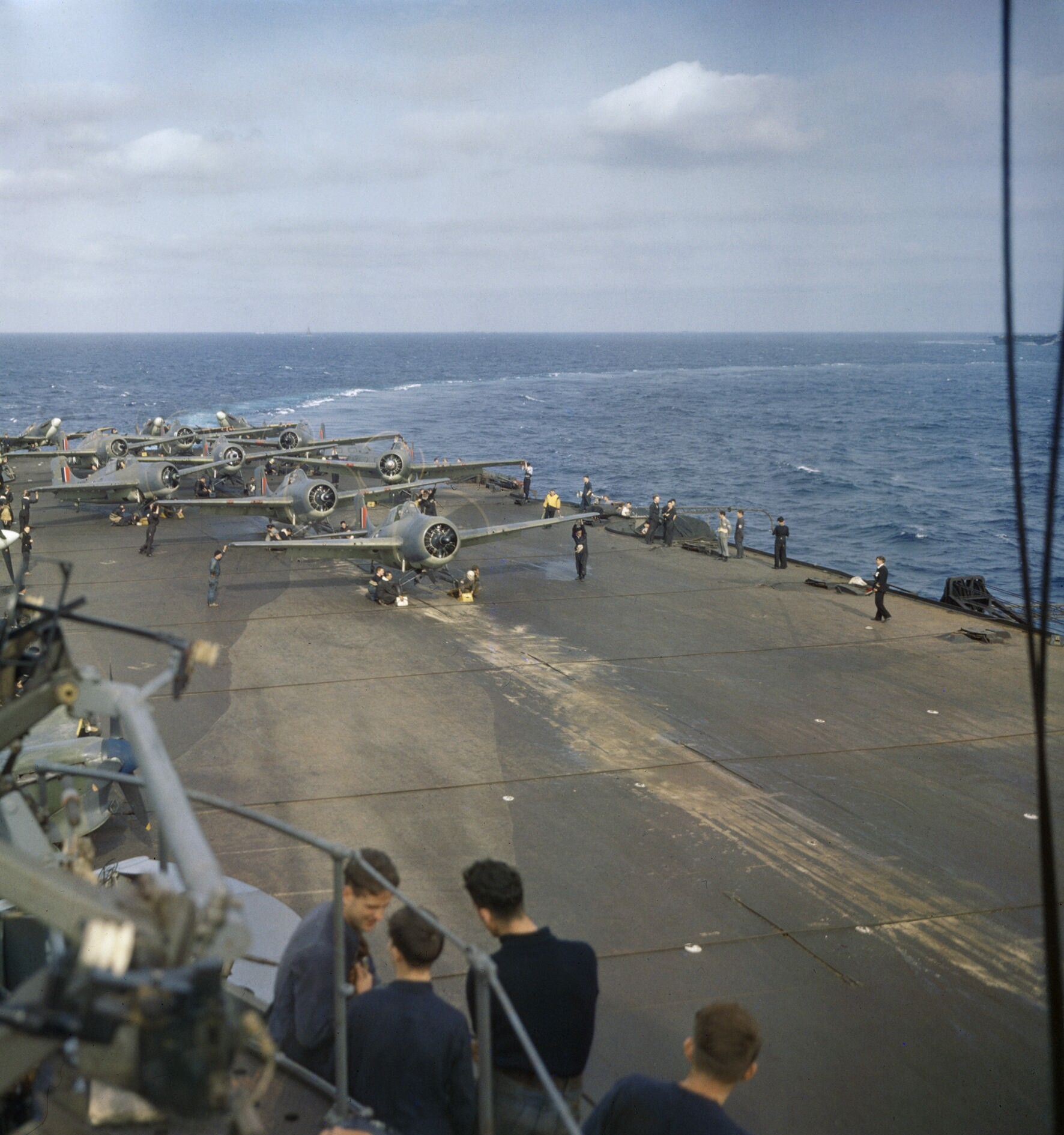
Grumman Martlet on the flight deck of HMS Formidable, North African Operations, November 1942

- HMS Formidable (21 October 1942 - 23 August 1943)
  - RN Air Section Gibraltar (Detachment five aircraft 5 - 12 January 1943)
  - La Senia Airfield (Detachment three aircraft 14 - 21 January 1943/3 - 7 February 1943)
  - RN Air Section Gibraltar (Detachment three aircraft 8 February - 12 March 1943/15 - 19 April 1943)
  - RN Air Section Tafaraoui (Detachment 6 - 14 June 1943)
- Royal Naval Air Station Dekheila (HMS Grebe) (23 - 28 August 1943)
- HMS Formidable (28 August - 18 October 1943)
  - HMS Unicorn (Detachment 11 - 12 September 1943)
- Royal Naval Air Station Machrihanish (HMS Landrail) (18 - 29 October 1943)
- HMS Formidable (29 October - 13 November 1943)
- Royal Naval Air Station Machrihanish (HMS Landrail)
  Royal Naval Air Station Stretton (HMS Blackcap)
  Royal Naval Air Station Yeovilton (HMS Heron) (13 - 16 November 1943)
- disbanded - (16 November 1943)

1956 - 1960

- Royal Naval Air Station Yeovilton (HMS Heron) (6 February - 8 June 1956)
- HMS Bulwark (8 - 20 June 1956)
- Royal Naval Air Station Yeovilton (HMS Heron) (20 June - 10 August 1956)
- Ciampino Airfield (transit 10 - 11 August 1956)
- Royal Naval Air Station Hal Far (HMS Falcon) (11 - 17 August 1956)
- HMS Eagle (17 - 24 August 1956)
- Royal Naval Air Station Hal Far (HMS Falcon) (24 August - 11 September 1956)
- HMS Eagle (11 - 14 September 1956)
- Royal Naval Air Station Hal Far (HMS Falcon) (14 - 25 September 1956)
- HMS Eagle (25 September - 13 October 1956)
- RN Air Section Gibraltar (13 - 20 October 1956)
- HMS Eagle (20 October - 30 November 1956)
- Royal Naval Air Station Hal Far (HMS Falcon) (30 November - 2 December 1956)
- HMS Eagle (2 - 24 December 1956)
- Royal Naval Air Station Hal Far (HMS Falcon) (24 December 1956 - 5 February 1957)
- HMS Ark Royal (5 - 25 February 1957)
- Royal Naval Air Station Merryfield (25 February - 28 August 1957)
- HMS Ark Royal (28 August - 26 October 1957)
- Royal Naval Air Station Merryfield (26 October 1957 - 27 January 1958)
- HMS Ark Royal (27 January - 24 June 1958)
- Royal Naval Air Station Yeovilton (HMS Heron) (24 June - 25 September 1958)

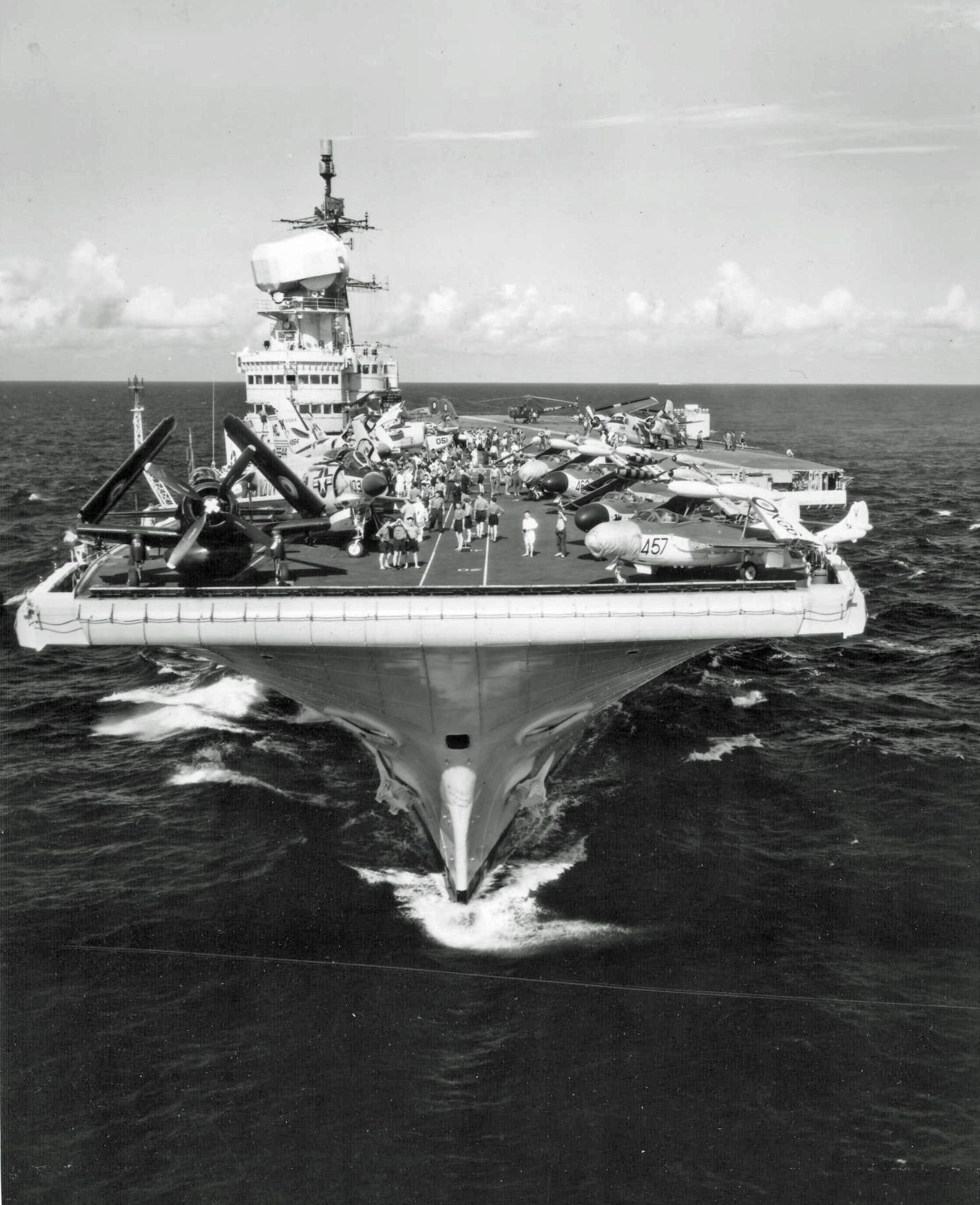
HMS Victorious bow shot 1959, including five de Havilland Sea Venom of 893 NAS

- HMS Victorious (25 September - 28 November 1958)
- Royal Naval Air Station Hal Far (HMS Falcon) (28 November - 9 December 1958)
- HMS Victorious (9 December 1958 - 13 January 1959)
- Royal Naval Air Station Yeovilton (HMS Heron) (13 January - 21 February 1959)
- HMS Victorious (21 February - 23 March 1959)
- Royal Naval Air Station Yeovilton (HMS Heron) (23 March - 5 May 1959)
- HMS Victorious (5 May - 9 August 1959)
- Royal Naval Air Station Yeovilton (HMS Heron) (9 August - 15 September 1959)
- HMS Victorious (15 September - 1 October 1959)
- Royal Naval Air Station Yeovilton (HMS Heron) (1 - 6 October 1959)
- Royal Naval Air Station Brawdy (HMS Goldcrest) (6 - 24 October 1959)
- Royal Naval Air Station Yeovilton (HMS Heron) (24 - 30 October 1959)
- HMS Victorious (30 October - 14 December 1959)
- Royal Naval Air Station Yeovilton (HMS Heron) (14 December 1959 - 7 January 1960)
- HMS Victorious (7 January - 25 February 1960)
- Royal Naval Air Station Yeovilton (HMS Heron) (25 - 29 February 1960)
- disbanded - (29 February 1960)

1960 - 1965

- Royal Naval Air Station Yeovilton (HMS Heron) (15 August - 24 November 1960)
  - HMS Hermes (Detachment two aircraft 27 August - 5 October 1960)
  - HMS Victorious (Detachment three aircraft 27 - 30 September 1960)
- Royal Naval Air Station Hal Far (HMS Falcon) (24 - 25 November 1960)
- HMS Ark Royal (25 November 1960 - 28 February 1961)
  - Royal Naval Air Station Hal Far (HMS Falcon) (Detachment three aircraft 18 December 1960 - 6 January 1961)
- Royal Naval Air Station Yeovilton (HMS Heron) (28 February - 1 April 1961)

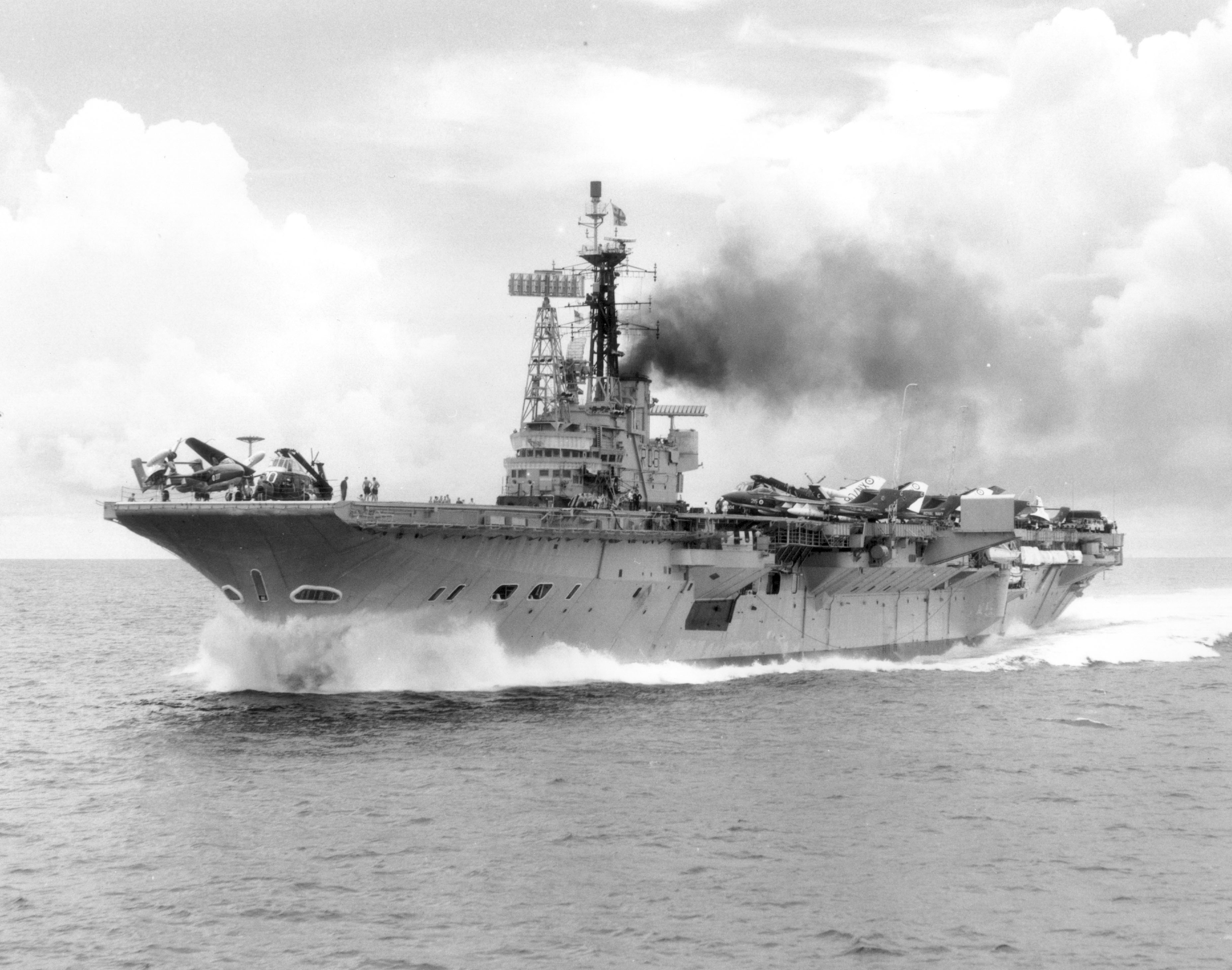
HMS Centaur

- HMS Centaur (1 April - 29 August 1961)
  - Royal Naval Air Station Hal Far (HMS Falcon) (Detachment six aircraft 29 April - 8 May 1961)
  - RN Air Section Gibraltar Detachment three aircraft (14 - 30 June 1961)
  - Royal Air Force Khormaksar Detachment three aircraft (12 - 21 July 1961)
  - Royal Naval Air Station Hal Far (HMS Falcon) (Detachment five aircraft 27 August 1961, to Royal Naval Air Station Yeovilton (HMS Heron) 29 August 1961)
- Royal Naval Air Station Yeovilton (HMS Heron) (1 September - 20 October 1961)
- HMS Centaur (20 October 1961)
  - Royal Naval Air Station Hal Far (HMS Falcon) (Detachment six aircraft 14 - 27 November 1961)
  - Royal Air Force Tengah (Detachment three aircraft 1 - 18 February 1962)
  - Royal Air Force Khormaksar (Detachment four aircraft 23 - 31 March 1962)
  - Royal Naval Air Station Hal Far (HMS Falcon) (Detachment seven aircraft 17 April - 3 May 1962)
- Royal Naval Air Station Yeovilton (HMS Heron) (14 May - 22 June 1962)
- HMS Centaur (22 June - 5 July 1962)
- Royal Naval Air Station Yeovilton (HMS Heron) (5 - 12 July 1962)
- HMS Centaur (12 July - 27 August 1962)
  - RN Air Section Gibraltar (Detachment four aircraft 29 July - 9 August 1962)
- Royal Naval Air Station Yeovilton (HMS Heron) (27 August - 20 September 1962)
- Royal Naval Air Station Hal Far (HMS Falcon) (20 - 22 September 1962)
- HMS Centaur (22 September - 25 October 1962)
- Royal Naval Air Station Yeovilton (HMS Heron) (25 October - 10 November 1962)
- HMS Centaur (10 - 20 November 1962)
- Royal Naval Air Station Yeovilton (HMS Heron) (20 November 1962 - 22 January 1963)
  - Royal Naval Air Station Culdrose (HMS Seahawk) (Detachment three aircraft 13 - 22 January 1963)
- HMS Centaur (22 January - 14 February 1963)
- Royal Naval Air Station Yeovilton (HMS Heron) (14 - 21 February 1963)
- HMS Centaur (21 February - 15 May 1963)
  - Royal Air Force Khormaksar (Detachment seven aircraft 5 - 18 March 1963)
  - Embakasi Airport (Detachment six aircraft 6 - 23 April 1963)
- Royal Naval Air Station Yeovilton (HMS Heron) (15 May - 14 August 1963)
- HMS Victorious (14 August - 25 September 1963)
- Royal Air Force Tengah (25 September - 17 October 1963)
- HMS Victorious (17 October 1963 - 12 June 1964)
  - Royal Air Force Kai Tak (Detachment six aircraft 23 October - 7 November 1963)
  - Royal Air Force Tengah (Detachment six aircraft 9 December 1963 - 3 January 1964)
  - Embakasi Airport (Detachment six aircraft 7 - 22 February 1964)
  - Royal Air Force Tengah (Detachment seven aircraft 18 March - 3 April 1964)
  - Royal Air Force Kai Tak (Detachment five aircraft 23 April - 6 May 1964)
- Royal Air Force Tengah (12 June - 21 August 1964)
- HMS Victorious (21 August 1964 - 22 July 1965)
  - Royal Air Force Tengah (Detachment eight aircraft 21 September - 7 December 1964)
  - Royal Air Force Kai Tak (Detahcment six aircraft 31 January - 16 February 1965)
  - Royal Air Force Changi (Detachment two aircraft 26 May - 8 June 1965)
- Royal Naval Air Station Yeovilton (HMS Heron) (22 - 29 July 1965)
- disbanded - (29 July 1965)

1965 - 1970

- Royal Naval Air Station Yeovilton (HMS Heron) (4 November 1965 - 14 May 1966)
- HMS Victorious (14 May - 9 June 1966)
- Royal Naval Air Station Yeovilton (HMS Heron) (9 June - 8 July 1966)
- HMS Victorious (8 July 1966 - 13 June 1967)
  - Royal Air Force Changi (Detachment six aircraft 15 August - 6 September 1966)
  - Royal Air Force Changi (Detachment five aircraft 9 December 1966 - 4 January 1967)
  - Royal Air Force Changi (Detachment five aircraft 16 February - 3 March 1967)
- Royal Naval Air Station Culdrose (HMS Seahawk) (aircraft) / Royal Naval Air Station Yeovilton (HMS Heron) (crews) (13 - 30 June 1967)
- Royal Air Force Boscombe Down (30 June - August 1967)
- Royal Naval Air Station Yeovilton (HMS Heron) (24 August 1967 - 18 April 1968)
- Royal Air Force Akrotiri (18 - 30 April 1968)
- Royal Naval Air Station Yeovilton (HMS Heron) (30 April - 31 May 1968)

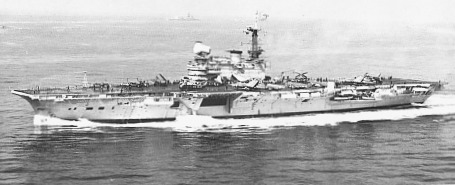
HMS Hermes

- HMS Hermes (31 May - 20 June 1968)
- Royal Naval Air Station Yeovilton (HMS Heron) (20 June - 8 July 1968)
- HMS Hermes (8 July - 29 August 1968)
- Royal Air Force Changi (29 August - 16 September 1968)
- HMS Hermes (16 September - 11 December 1968)
- Royal Air Force Changi (11 December 1968 - 13 January 1969)
- HMS Hermes (13 January - 1 April 1969)
- Royal Naval Air Station Yeovilton (HMS Heron) (1 April - 25 September 1969)
  - Royal Naval Air Station Ballykelly (HMS Sealion) (Detachment six aircraft 23 - 28 May 1969)
- HMS Hermes (25 September - 27 October 1969)
- Royal Naval Air Station Yeovilton (HMS Heron) (27 October - 14 November 1969)
- HMS Hermes (14 November - 3 December 1969)
- Royal Naval Air Station Yeovilton (HMS Heron) (3 December 1969 - 14 January 1970)
- HMS Hermes (14 January - 17 June 1970)
  - Royal Air Force Luqa (Detachment seven aircraft 16 February - 6 March / 13 April - 4 May 1970)
  - Royal Air Force Akrotiri (Detachment three aircraft 23 May - 1 June 1970)
- Royal Naval Air Station Yeovilton (HMS Heron) (17 June - 14 July 1970)
- disbanded - (14 July 1970)

== Commanding officers ==
List of commanding officers of 893 Naval Air Squadron:

1942 - 1943

- Lieutenant(A) R.G. French, RNVR, from 15 June 1942
- Lieutenant Commander(A) R.B. Pearson, RN, from 12 September 1943
- Lieutenant Commander D.R.B. Cosh, RCNVR, from 11 November 1943
- disbanded 16 November 1943

1956 - 1960

- Lieutenant Commander M.W. Henley, DSC, RN, from 6 February 1956
- Lieutenant Commander G.J.R. Elgar, RN, from 13 May 1957
- Lieutenant Commander E.V.H. Manuel, RN, from 9 June 1958 (Commander 31 December 1959)
- disbanded - 29 February 1960

1960 - 1965

- Lieutenant Commander F.D. Stanley, RN, from 15 August 1960
- Lieutenant Commander K.E. Kemp, RN, from 18 December 1962
- Lieutenant Commander D. Melhuish, RN, from 1 July 1964
- Lieutenant Commander J.A. Sanderson, RN, from 26 November 1964 (Killed in flight accident 22 January 1965)
- Lieutenant Commander R. King, RN, from 23 January 1965
- disbanded - 29 July 1965

1965 - 1970

- Lieutenant Commander G.P. Carne, RN, from 4 November 1965
- Lieutenant Commander R. McQueen, RN, from 2 October 1967
- Lieutenant Commander R.C. Sturgeon, RN, from 31 May 1968
- Lieutenant Commander T.J. Bolt, RN, 2 April 1969
- disbanded - 14 July 1970
