= 892 Naval Air Squadron =

Inactive flying squadron of the Royal Navy's Fleet Air Arm

- Squadron badge
- Active: 1942–1943; 1945–1946; 1955–1957; 1959–1968; 1969–1978
- Disbanded: 15 December 1978
- Country: United Kingdom
- Branch: Royal Navy
- Type: Single-seat fighter squadron
- Role: Carrier-based fighter squadron
- Part of: Fleet Air Arm
- Home station: See Naval air stations section for full list.
- Motto: Strike Unseen
- Aircraft: See Aircraft flown section for full list.
- Engagements: World War II: Battle of the Atlantic; Suez Crisis: Operation Musketeer
- Battle honours: Atlantic 1943

Insignia
- Squadron Badge Description: Black, above water barry wavy of six white and black and below a flash of lightning white a human eye proper conjoined with two wings displayed gold (1946)
- Identification Markings: single letters (Martlet); 05A+ later 5A+ (Hellcat); 251-258 (Sea Venom); 445-452 (Sea Venom January 1956); 207-219 later 301-314 (Sea Vixen); 001-017 (Phantom)
- Fin Carrier Codes: Z (Sea Venom); J (Sea Venom January 1956); R:V:H:C later H (Sea Vixen); R (Phantom)

892 Naval Air Squadron (892 NAS), also known as 892 Squadron, was a Fleet Air Arm (FAA) naval air squadron of the United Kingdom’s Royal Navy (RN). It most recently operated the Phantom FG.1 all-weather, long-range supersonic jet interceptor and fighter-bomber, between March 1969 and December 1978.

Established during the Second World War in July 1942, as a fighter squadron in the United States, it embarked in HMS Battler in December for the United Kingdom, disembarking at HMS Landrail, RNAS Machrihanish. In February 1943, the squadron was assigned to HMS Archer to provide air cover for Atlantic convoys, but was officially disbanded aboard the ship in August. Re-established as a night fighter squadron, at HMS Gannet, RNAS Eglinton, Northern Ireland, in April 1945, the squadron conducted training exercises at HMS Nighthawk, RNAS Drem, before embarking in HMS Ocean towards the end of the year, ultimately disbanding in the spring of 1946.

In July 1955, 892 Naval Air Squadron was reestablished as an All-Weather Fighter unit. The squadron embarked on HMS Albion in January 1956, for operations in the Mediterranean and the Far East. In August it joined HMS Eagle, participating in attacks on Egyptian airfields during the Suez Crisis. The squadron was officially disbanded aboard HMS Eagle in January 1957. 892 Squadron was re-established at HMS Heron, RNAS Yeovilton, in July 1959, from 700Y Naval Air Squadron. It took part in exercises in the Mediterranean and the Far East, embarked in HMS Ark Royal, HMS Victorious, HMS Hermes and HMS Centaurus. The squadron disbanded at HMS Heron in October 1968.

In March 1969, it was reformed at HMS Heron from a core group of 700P Squadron, equipped with Phantom FG. 1. It joined the Air Group of HMS Ark Royal alongside 809 Naval Air Squadron (Blackburn Buccaneer), 824 Naval Air Squadron (ASW Sea King), and B Flight of 849 Naval Air Squadron, (AEW Gannet). In May, the squadron participated in the Daily Mail Transatlantic Air Race. It spent many periods on board HMS Ark Royal, with deployments to the Mediterranean, the Caribbean, and the US. While stationed at RAF Leuchars from August 1973, it also provided aircraft for the Quick Reaction Alert. The squadron was disbanded in December 1978.

== History ==
=== Single-seat fighter squadron (1942-1943) ===
892 Naval Air Squadron was first formed on 15 July 1942 at Naval Air Station Norfolk, Virginia as a single-seat fighter squadron. It was equipped with six Grumman Martlet IV fighters when it embarked on the newly completed escort aircraft carrier Battler for passage across the Atlantic on 21 December 1942. In February 1943, the squadron embarked aboard Archer, which supported convoys in the North Atlantic. The squadron's strength was reduced to three Martlets in June 1943, and it was disbanded on 11 August 1943, passing its aircraft to 819 Naval Air Squadron.

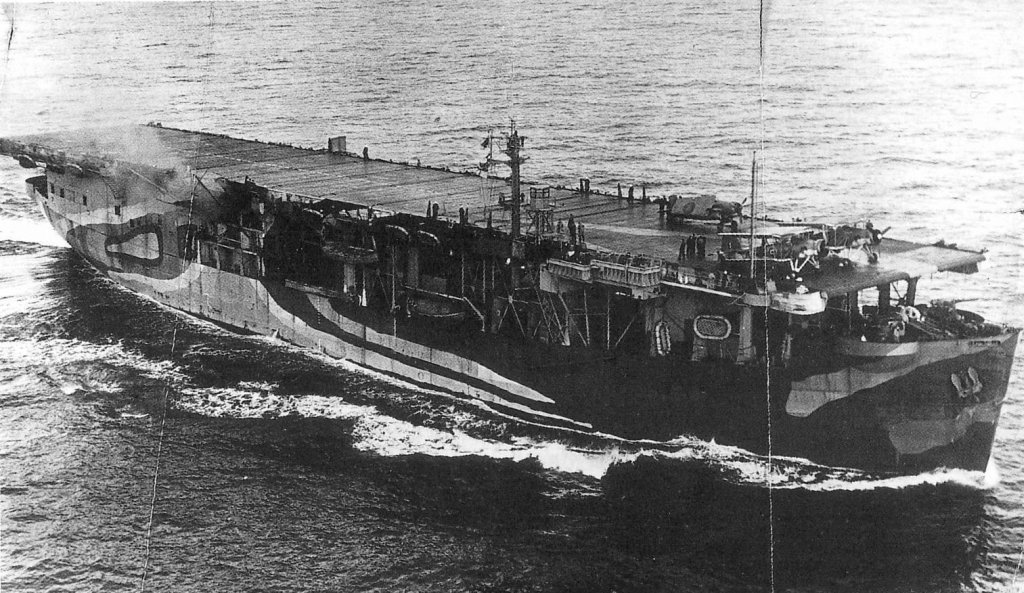
HMS Archer with an 892 NAS Grumman Martlet and two 819 NAS Fairey Swordfish on deck.

=== Night fighter squadron (1945-1946) ===
892 Squadron reformed on 1 April 1945 at RNAS Eglinton (now City of Derry Airport) in Northern Ireland as a night fighter squadron, equipped with Grumman Hellcat II NFs, being the first Fleet Air Arm squadron to be equipped with the night fighter version of the Hellcat. The squadron moved to Drem in Scotland for training in its night fighter duties in July 1945, and in December 1945 embarked on the carrier Ocean. Ocean had been fitted out during construction as a dedicated nightfighter carrier, and was sent to the Mediterranean carrying 892 Squadron's Hellcats and 1792 Squadron's Fairey Fireflys, in order to evaluate night carrier operations and compare the single-seat Hellcat against the two-seat Firefly as a night fighter. The trials continued into April 1946, showing that intensive night operations from aircraft carriers were practicable, and that the Firefly was more suitable for the Fleet Air Arm's short-term requirements for a night fighter. The squadron disbanded at Gosport on 19 April 1946.

=== Sea Venom (1955-1957) ===
The squadron recommissioned at Yeovilton on 4 July 1955, as an all-weather fighter squadron equipped with the de Havilland Sea Venom. In January 1956, it embarked aboard Albion for a deployment to the Mediterranean and Far East, the carrier returning to Britain in May 1956. In July 1956, the squadron flew out to Malta to join the carrier Eagle, and from 31 October took part in Operation Musketeer, the Anglo-French attack on the Suez Canal, attacking ground targets and providing air cover for the invasion forces. The squadron was disbanded again on 26 December 1956, being incorporated into 893 Naval Air Squadron.

=== Sea Vixen (1959-1968) ===
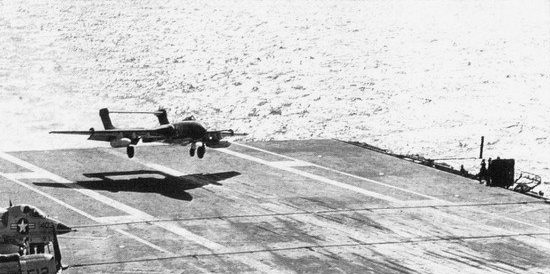
An 892 Sqn Sea Vixen FAW.1 from HMS Hermes (R12) landing aboard USS Ranger (CVA-61), 1963.

On 1 July 1959 892 Squadron was reformed at Yeovilton from 700Y Squadron with de Havilland Sea Vixen all-weather fighters, being the first operational fighter squadron to use the Sea Vixen. Eight of the squadron's 12 Sea Vixens deployed aboard Ark Royal in March 1960, while the remaining flight of four Sea Vixens were used to test the Firestreak air-to-air missiles that were the Sea Vixen's primary armament. The two flights rejoined aboard Ark Royal in August 1960, before disembarking on 30 September. In October 1960, the squadron deployed aboard Victorious, which sailed for the Far East in January, returning to Britain in December that year, while from May 1962 to October 1963, the squadron served aboard Hermes on another deployment to the Far East. In December 1963, the squadron was embarked aboard Centaur for a highly active deployment to the Middle and Far East. In April, the squadron's Sea Vixens carried out air strikes against rebelling tribesmen in the Radfan Campaign, while later in the year the squadron flew air defence and surface search patrols around southern Malaysia as Centaur took part in the Indonesia–Malaysia confrontation.

The squadron returned to Yeovilton in July 1965 and re-equipped with the improved FAW2 version of the Sea Vixen by the end of the year. In January 1967, the squadron sailed to the Far East aboard Hermes, returning to Britain and disembarking in February 1968. In 1968 the squadron provided the Fleet Air Arm's official air display team, known as Simon's Sircus [sic] aerobatic team, after the squadron's commanding officer, Lieutenant Commander Simon Idiens. It displayed at airshows throughout the summer of 1968 before disbanding on 4 October that year.

=== Phantom FG.1 (1969-1978) ===
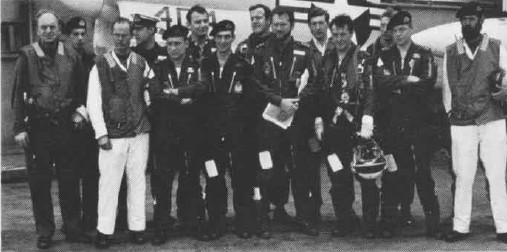
Personnel of 892 Squadron on the USS Saratoga in 1969.

892 Naval Air Squadron was officially reformed on 31 March 1969 at RNAS Yeovilton (HMS Heron), Somerset. This reformation was based on a core group from 700P Naval Air Squadron. The squadron was equipped with Phantom FG.1, marking it as the sole front-line operational unit of this aircraft type within the Royal Navy. In this context, 700P Naval Air Squadron served as the Intensive Flying Trials Unit (IFTU), while 767 Naval Air Squadron functioned as the Operational Conversion Unit (OCU).

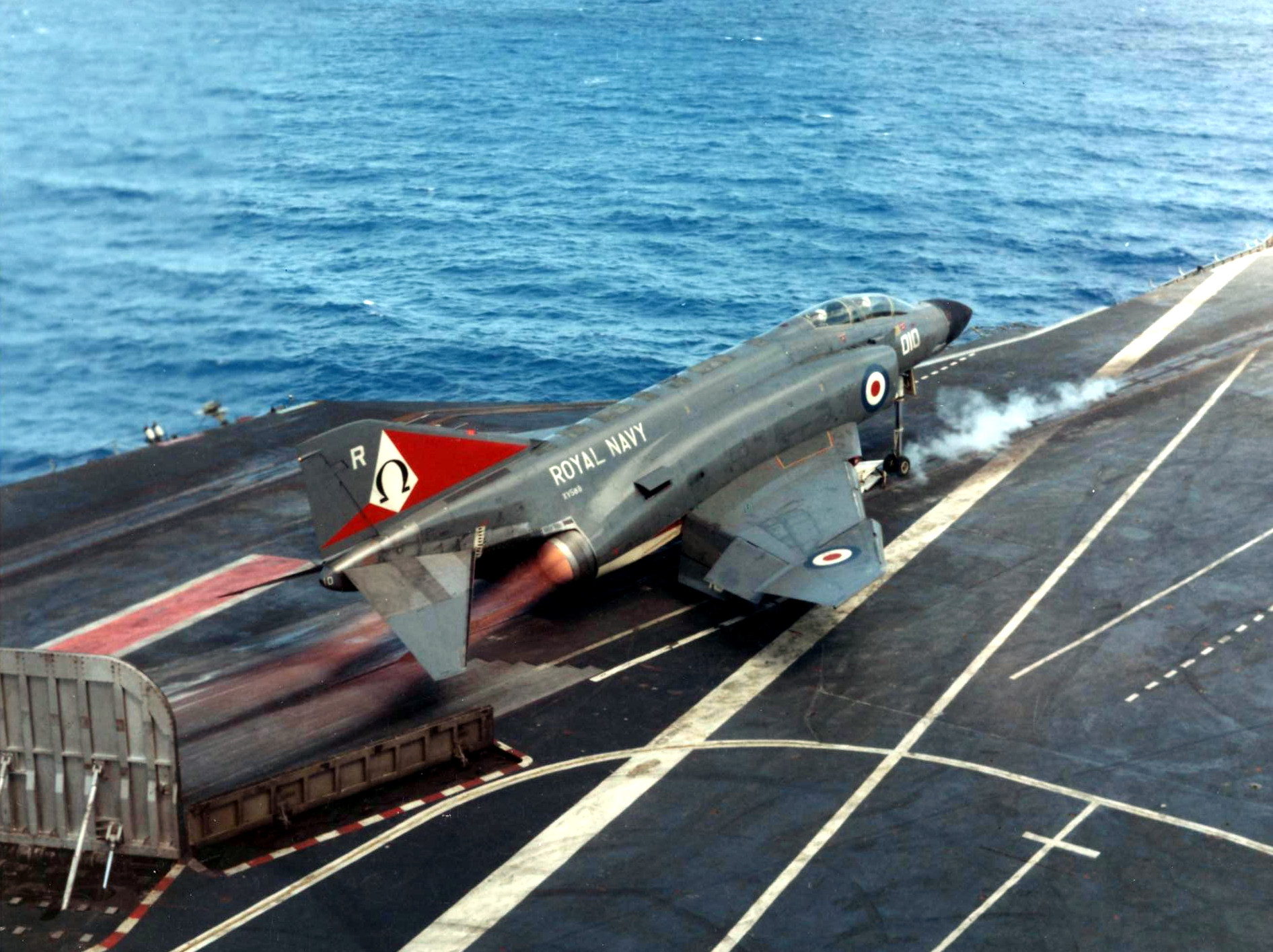
An 892 NAS Phantom FG.1 launching from HMS Ark Royal March 1972

In 1964 the Royal Navy had envisaged operating 140 Phantoms with a combined carrier fleet of HMS Ark Royal, HMS Eagle, and the new super-carrier CVA-01. However, these plans were significantly curtailed when the government's 1966 Defence White Paper cancelled the CVA-01 project in 1966, and, amid further defence cuts, only proceeded to refurbish HMS Ark Royal and HMS Eagle. As a result, the number of Phantoms planned to be operated was cut to 134 and then to 110. Eventually only 48 examples were ordered, which was enough for two squadrons of 12 aircraft each for Ark Royal and Eagle, and with additional aircraft for a training squadron (767 Naval Air Squadron) and reserves. However, as aircraft were beginning to be delivered during 1968 Eagle’s refit was cancelled and 20 aircraft were allocated to the Royal Air Force (RAF).

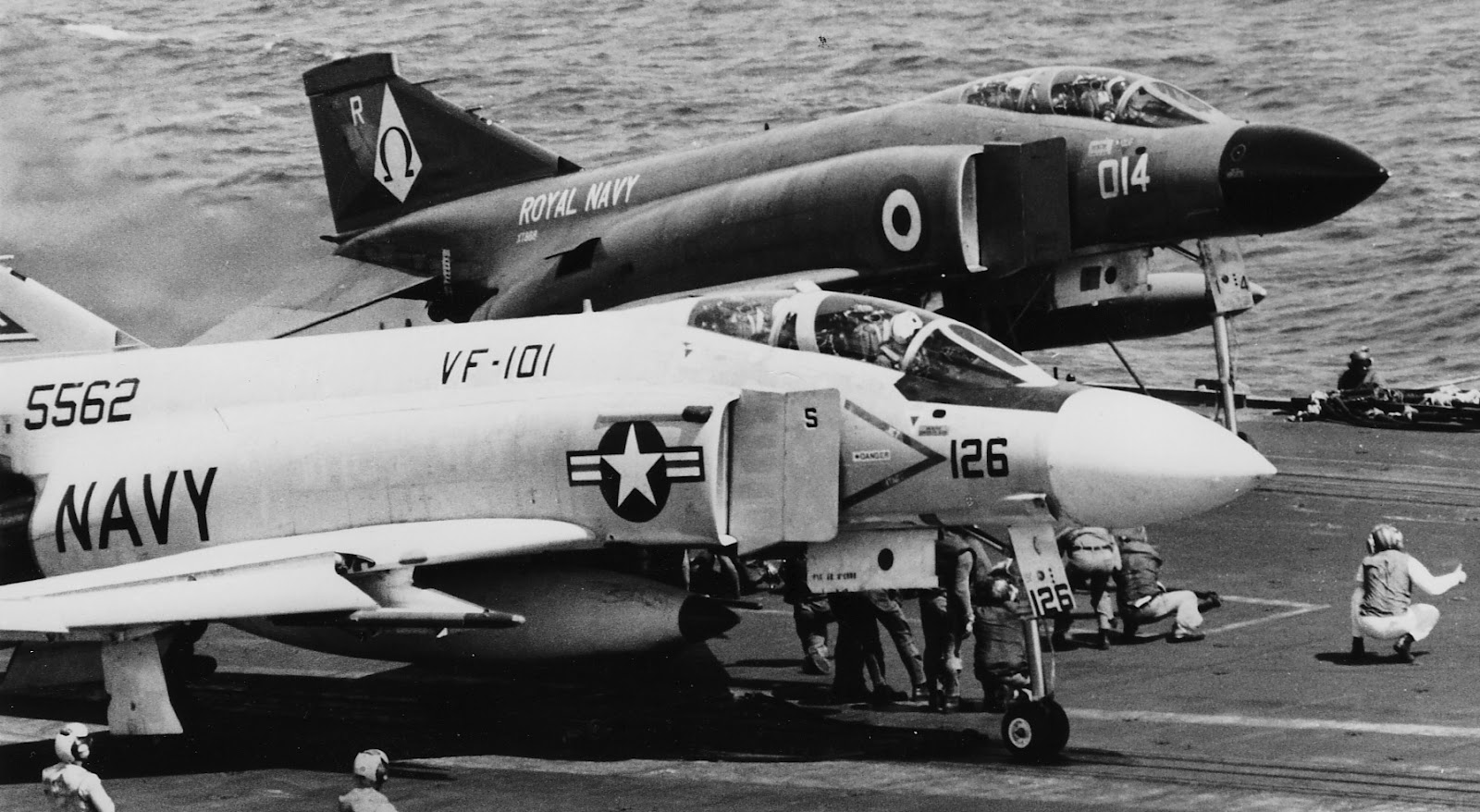
An F-4J of VF-101 alongside an F-4K of 892 Naval Air Squadron wait to be catapulted from the USS Independence, March 1975

Against a backdrop of defence cuts 892 Squadron suspected that it would become the last fixed-wing squadron and poignantly adopted a large Ω symbol on a white diamond placed on a red fin flash as its squadron symbol. Despite its (later to be proved unjustified) claim to being the last Royal Naval squadron to operate fixed wing fighters (Sea Harriers began equipping the Fleet Air Arm in April 1980), 892 gained worldwide exposure when one of their Phantoms won the Daily Mail Trans-Atlantic Air Race in May 1969. Lieutenant Commander Brian Davies, and Lieutenant Commander Peter Goddard set a record for flight time from New York to London of 4 hours 46 minutes and 57 seconds.

With HMS Ark Royal ready, Phantoms from 892 NAS were embarked and operations could begin, with additional aircraft from 767 using the carrier for practice. Shortly afterwards 767 NAS was disbanded with the personnel and equipment moving to the Phantom Training Flight (a Royal Navy unit), and based at RAF Leuchars, Fife, Scotland in 1972. 892 was also to move base from RNAS Yeovilton to RAF Leuchars in the same year.

Whilst disembarked at RAF Leuchars the squadron provided Interceptor Alert Force aircraft with both No. 23 Squadron (English Electric Lightning) and No. 43 Squadron (Phantom FG.1) of the RAF, who themselves had been equipped with the F4K Phantoms that became surplus when it was decided not to employ another Royal Navy Phantom FG.1 squadron in HMS Eagle.

Throughout the 1970s the unit was involved in a variety of NATO and Royal Navy exercises. However, the complex maintenance of the Phantom was to consistently plague the aircraft, despite great efforts by crew and maintainers. These efforts were depicted in the BBC documentary Sailor.

With HMS Ark Royal due to pay off in December 1978 it was confirmed that there was to be no future for 892 Naval Air Squadron. On 27 November 1978, Phantom FG.1, XT870/012, became the last aircraft to be catapulted from a British aircraft carrier. 892 Naval Air Squadron was disbanded on 15 December 1978 and its Phantom FG.1s were transferred to No. 111 Squadron at RAF Leuchars.

== Aircraft flown ==
Types of aircraft flown by 892 Naval Air Squadron include:

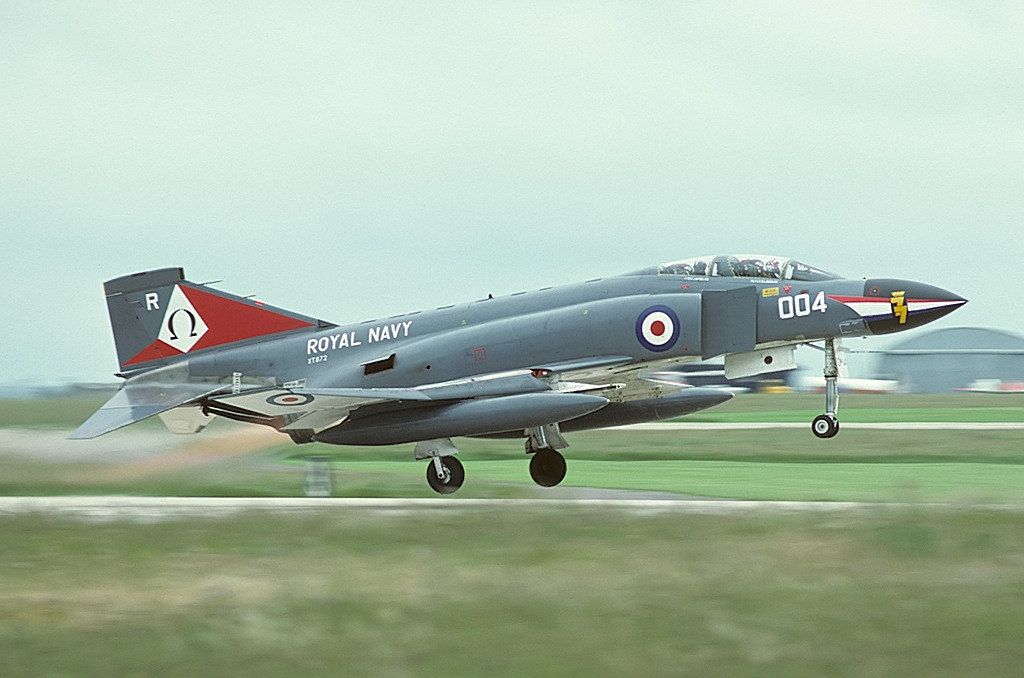
McDonnell Douglas F-4K Phantom FG.1

- Grumman Wildcat F4F-3 (July - September 1942)
- Grumman Martlet Mk IV fighter aircraft (September 1942 - August 1943)
- Grumman Hellcat F. Mk. I fighter aircraft (April - July 1945)
- Grumman Hellcat N.F. Mk II night fighter version (May 1945 - April 1946)
- de Havilland Sea Venom FAW.21 jet fighter-bomber (July 1955 - December 1956)
- de Havilland Sea Vixen FAW.1 jet fighter aircraft (July 1959 - February 1966)
- de Havilland Sea Vixen FAW.2 jet fighter aircraft (December 1965 - October 1968)
- McDonnell Douglas F-4K Phantom FG.1 jet interceptor and fighter-bomber (March 1969 - November 1978)

== Battle honours ==
The following Battle Honours have been awarded to 892 Naval Air Squadron.

- Atlantic 1943

== Naval air stations and aircraft carriers ==
892 Naval Air Squadron operated from a number of naval air stations of the Royal Navy in the UK and overseas, and also a number of Royal Navy fleet carriers and escort carriers and other airbases overseas:

1942 - 1943

- RN Air Section Norfolk (15 July - 8 December 1942)
  - Naval Reserve Air Base Chicago (Detachment DLT USS Wolverine 26 - 29 September 1942)
- HMS Battler (8 December 1942 - 5 January 1943)
- Royal Naval Air Station Machrihanish (HMS Landrail) (5 January - 21 February 1943)
- HMS Archer (21 February - 9 April 1943)
- Royal Air Force Ballykelly (9 - 23 April 1943)
- Royal Naval Air Station Machrihanish (HMS Landrail) (23 April - 12 June 1943)
  - HMS Archer ('A' Flight Detachment three aircraft 24 April - 26 May 1943)
- Royal Naval Air Station Abbotsinch (HMS Sanderling) (12 - 15 June 1943)
- HMS Archer (15 June - 11 August 1943)
- disbanded - (11 August 1943)

1945 - 1946

- Royal Naval Air Station Eglinton (HMS Gannet) (1 April - 3 July 1945)
- HMS Premier (3 - 6 July 1945)
- Royal Naval Air Station Drem (HMS Nighthawk) (6 July - 2 November 1945)
- Royal Naval Air Station Machrihanish (HMS Landrail) (2 - 22 November 1945)
- HMS Ocean (22 - 29 November 1945)
- Royal Naval Air Station Lee-on-Solent (HMS Daedalus) (29 November - 7 December 1945)
- HMS Ocean (7 December 1945 - 4 January 1946)
- Royal Naval Air Station Hal Far (HMS Falcon) (4 January - 18 February 1946)
- HMS Ocean (18 February - 16 April 1946)
- Royal Naval Air Station Donibristle (HMS Merlin) (16 - 19 April 1946)
- Royal Naval Air Station Gosport (HMS Siskin) (19 April 1946)
- disbanded - (19 April 1946)

1955 - 1957

- Royal Naval Air Station Yeovilton (HMS Heron) (4 July 1955 - 10 January 1956)
- HMS Albion (10 January - 14 May 1956)
- Royal Naval Air Station Hal Far (HMS Falcon) (Detachment four aircraft 27 January - 6 February 1956)
- Royal Naval Air Station Yeovilton (HMS Heron) (14 May - 11 July 1956)
- Royal Naval Air Station Hal Far (HMS Falcon) (11 July - 14 August 1956)
- HMS Eagle (14 - 24 August 1956)
- Royal Naval Air Station Hal Far (HMS Falcon) (24 August - 4 September 1956)
- HMS Eagle (4 - 16 September 1956)
- Royal Naval Air Station Hal Far (HMS Falcon) (16 - 25 September 1956)
- HMS Eagle (25 September - 30 November 1956)
  - RN Air Section Gibraltar (Detachment three aircraft 13 - 20 October 1956)
  - Royal Naval Air Station Hal Far (HMS Falcon) (Detachment two aircraft 24 - 29 October 1956)
- Royal Naval Air Station Hal Far (HMS Falcon) (30 November - 11 December 1956)
- HMS Eagle (11 December 1956 - 5 January 1957)
- disbanded - (5 January 1957)

== Commanding officers ==
List of commanding officers of 892 Naval Air Squadron:

1942 - 1943

- Lieutenant(A) K. Firth, RNVR, from 13 December 1942
- Lieutenant(A) J.G. Large, RNVR, from 1 March 1943
- disbanded - 11 August 1943

1945 - 1946

- Major J.O. Armour, RM, from 1 April 1945
- disbanded - 19 April 1946

1955 - 1957

- Lieutenant Commander M.H.J. Petrie, RN, from 4 July 1955
- Lieutenant Commander W.A.M. Ferguson, DSC, RN, from 26 November 1956
- disbanded 5 January 1957

1959 - 1968

- Commander M.H.J. Petrie, RN, from 1 July 1959
- Lieutenant Commander D.M.A.H. Hamilton, RN, from 18 April 1960
- Lieutenant Commander A. Gray, RN, from 7 June 1961 (Commander 31 December 1962)
- Lieutenant Commander I.F. Blake, RN, from 8 April 1963
- Lieutenant Commander B.G. Young, RN, from 28 August 1964
- Lieutenant Commander E.J. Trounsen, RN, from 10 September 1965
- Lieutenant Commander J.N.S. Anderdon, RN, from 8 November 1965
- Lieutenant Commander S. Idiens, RN, from 19 May 1967
- disbanded - 4 October 1968

1969 - 1978

- Lieutenant Commander B. Davies, AFC, RN, from 31 March 1969
- Lieutenant Commander N.H. Kerr, RN, from 2 October 1970
- Lieutenant Commander C.R. Hunneyball, RN, from 10 July 1972
- Lieutenant Commander W.L.T. Peppe, RN, from 8 January 1974
- Lieutenant Commander H.S. Drake, RN, from 9 December 1975
- Lieutenant Commander N.R. Harris, RN, from 6 April 1977 (Commander 30 June 1977)
- Lieutenant Commander B.E. Steed, RN, from 5 September 1977
- Lieutenant Commander J.E. Ellis, RN, from 3 October 1977
- disbanded 15 December 1978

Note: Abbreviation (A) signifies Air Branch of the RN or RNVR.

== See also ==
- McDonnell Douglas Phantom in UK service
- Royal Navy and Fleet Air Arm aerobatic teams
