= De Havilland Sea Venom =

Carrier-based fighter aircraft family

Sea Venom/Aquilon
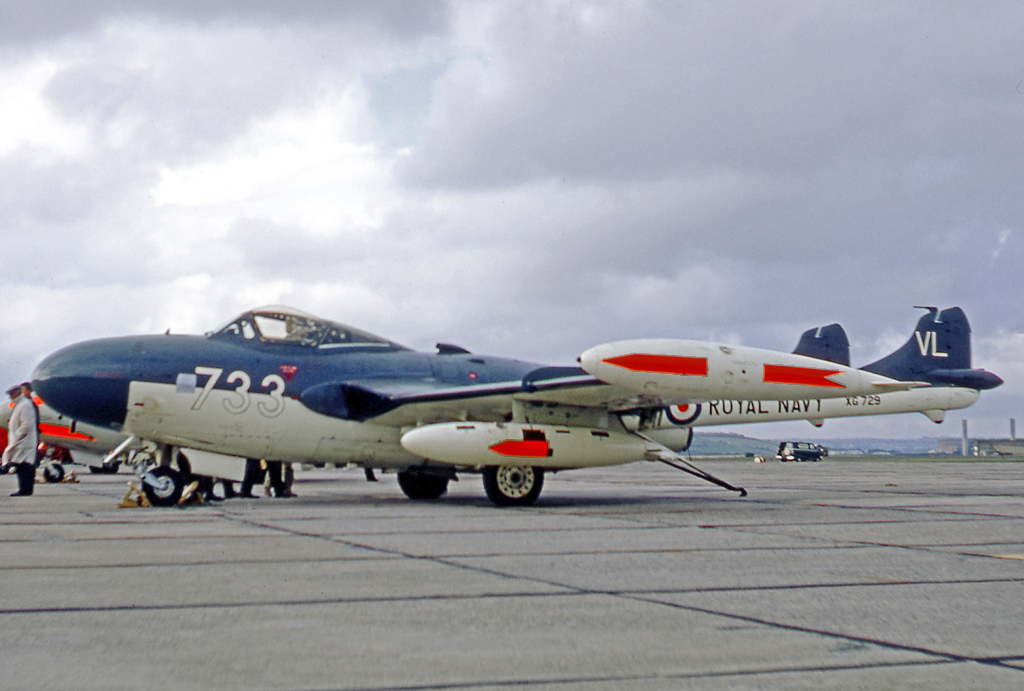
- Operational Royal Navy Sea Venom FAW.22 at RAF Chivenor in 1969

General information
- Type: Fighter-bomber
- National origin: United Kingdom
- Manufacturer: de Havilland Aircraft Company; SNCASE
- Primary users: Royal Navy French Navy; Royal Australian Navy

History
- First flight: 19 April 1951
- Retired: 1970
- Developed from: de Havilland Venom

The de Havilland DH.112 Sea Venom is a British postwar carrier-capable jet aircraft developed from the de Havilland Venom. It served with the Royal Navy Fleet Air Arm and with the Royal Australian Navy. The French Navy operated the Aquilon, developed from the Sea Venom FAW.20, built under licence by SNCASE (Sud-Est).

== Design and development ==
The Sea Venom was the navalised version of the Venom NF.2 two-seat night fighter, and was used as an all-weather interceptor by the Fleet Air Arm (FAA). The necessary modifications for use on the Royal Navy's aircraft carriers included folding wings, a tailhook (which retracted into a characteristic "lip" over the jetpipe) and strengthened, long-stroke undercarriage. The canopy was modified to allow ejection from underwater. The first prototype made its first flight in 1951, and began carrier trials that same year. A further two prototypes were built. The first production Sea Venom took the designation FAW.20 (Fighter, All-Weather). It was powered by a single de Havilland Ghost 103 turbojet engine and its armament was the same as the RAF version. The next variant was the FAW.21, which included the modifications introduced in the Venom NF.2A and NF.3. Some of these modifications included the Ghost 104 engine, a clear-view canopy and American radar. The final Royal Navy variant was the FAW.22 powered by the Ghost 105 engine. A total of 39 of this type were built in 1957–58. Some were later fitted out with the de Havilland Firestreak air-to-air missile.

Seven FAW.21s were modified in 1958 for Electronic countermeasures (ECM) purposes, with the cannon replaced by the ECM equipment. These became the ECM.21. 831 Naval Air Squadron, the sole squadron to be equipped with it, was shore-based at RAF Watton from 1963 and disbanded in 1966. Converted FAW.22s were similarly known as the ECM.22.

A modernised Sea Venom project, the DH.116 with swept wings and upgraded radar was considered, but cancelled as the Royal Navy believed that any replacement needed two engines. The de Havilland Sea Vixen ultimately replaced the Sea Venom.

== Operational history ==
=== Royal Navy service ===
In 1956 Sea Venoms, alongside RAF Venoms, took part in the Suez War. They were from Nos. 809, 891, 892, 893, 894, 895 Naval Air Squadrons based on the light fleet carrier HMS Albion and fleet carrier HMS Eagle. The Anglo-French invasion, codenamed Operation Musketeer, began on 31 October 1956 signalling the beginning of the Suez War. The Sea Venoms launched many sorties, bombing a variety of targets in Egypt in the process.

Sea Venoms also saw service during conflicts in the Middle East.

By 1959, the Sea Venom began to be replaced in Royal Navy service by the de Havilland Sea Vixen, an aircraft that also had the distinctive twin-boom tail. The Sea Venom would be withdrawn from frontline service soon afterwards. The type continued to fly with second line FAA units until the last were withdrawn in 1970.

=== Service with other nations ===
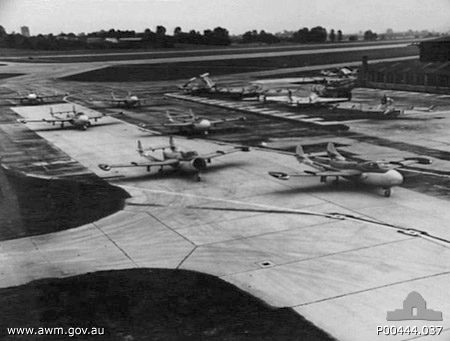
Royal Navy Sea Venom aircraft being handed over to the Royal Australian Navy, ca. 1955

Thirty-nine Sea Venom FAW.53s saw service with the Royal Australian Navy (RAN), replacing the Hawker Sea Fury. The Sea Venom entered service in 1956 and, during its service with the RAN, operated off the aircraft carrier HMAS Melbourne. It was taken out of first-line service in 1967, replaced by the American McDonnell Douglas A-4G Skyhawk.

France, which had been building Vampires and Mistrals under license since 1949, secured another license to produce the "Sea Venom" starting in the summer of 1951.

The engines were built by Fiat in Italy, and the aircraft by SNCASE. Five versions were produced under the designation "Aquilon" and operated by units from 1955 to 1966. The Aquilon's final official flight with the Naval Air Arm took place on June 30, 1966.

From 1957 to 1961, French Navy Aquilons took part in counter-insurgency operations in Algeria. They were withdrawn from service in 1966.

== Variants ==
=== Sea Venom ===
DH.112 Sea Venom NF.20
Prototype Sea Venom, based on Venom NF.2., three-built.
FAW.20
Initial production aircraft, based on Venom NF.2A. 4,850 lbf (21.6 kN) Ghost 103 turbojet engine, AI Mk 10 (US SCR 720) radar. 50 built.
FAW.21
Improved version, equivalent to Venom NF.3. 4,950 lbf (22.1 kN) Ghost 104 engine, AI Mk 21 (US APS-57) radar, strengthened long-stroke undercarriage. 167 built.
ECM.21
Six FAW.21s modified from 1957 for ECM purposes. No armament.
FAW.22
More powerful (5,300 lbf (23.6 kN)) Ghost 105 engine, giving improved high-altitude performance. 39 new built.
ECM.22
Equivalent of ECM.21, based on FAW.22
FAW.53
Australian designation for the Sea Venom FAW.21. 39 built.

=== SNCASE Aquilon ===
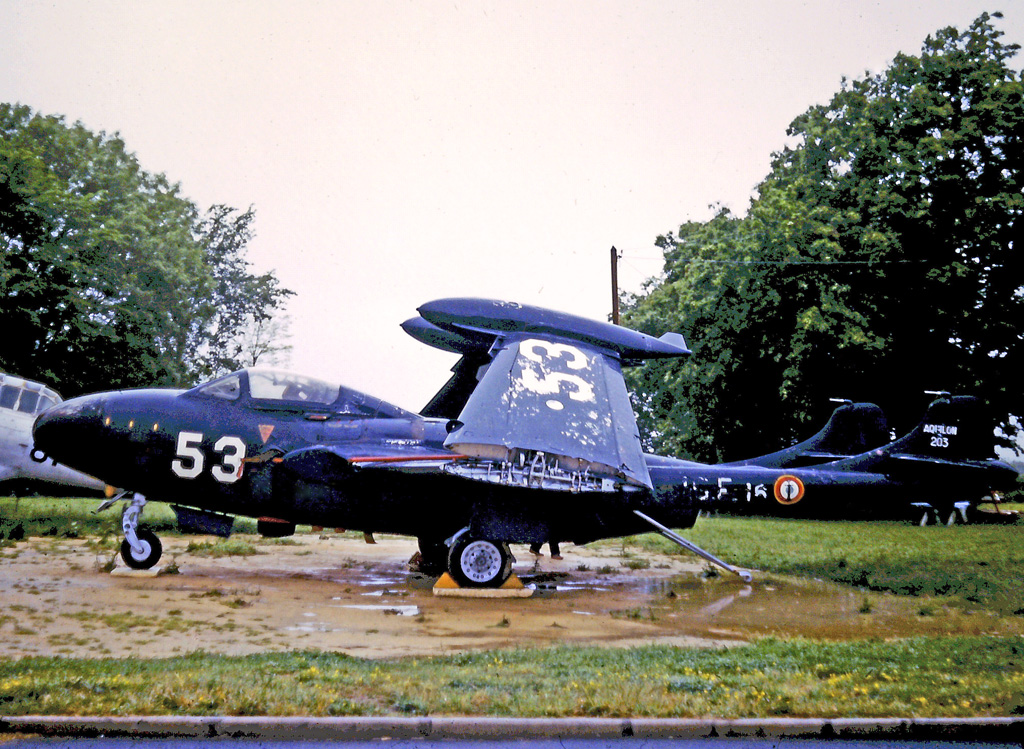
French-built Aquilon 203 displayed at Lorient South Brittany Airport in 1973

SNCASE (Sud-Est) license-built 101 Sea Venom FAW.20 as the Aquilon for the French Navy.

- Aquilon 20 – 4 examples assembled from the parts provided by de Havilland plus 25 locally built.
- Aquilon 201 – Three prototypes built in France.
- Aquilon 202 – Two-seat version with ejection seats, an American AN/APQ-65 radar and air-conditioning. 25 built.
- Aquilon 203 – Single-seat version with an American AN/APQ-94 radar and equipped with racks for air-to-air missiles. Prototype converted from Aquilon 202 plus 40 built.
- Aquilon 204 – Two-seat training version without guns. 6 Converted from Aquilon 20.

== Operators ==
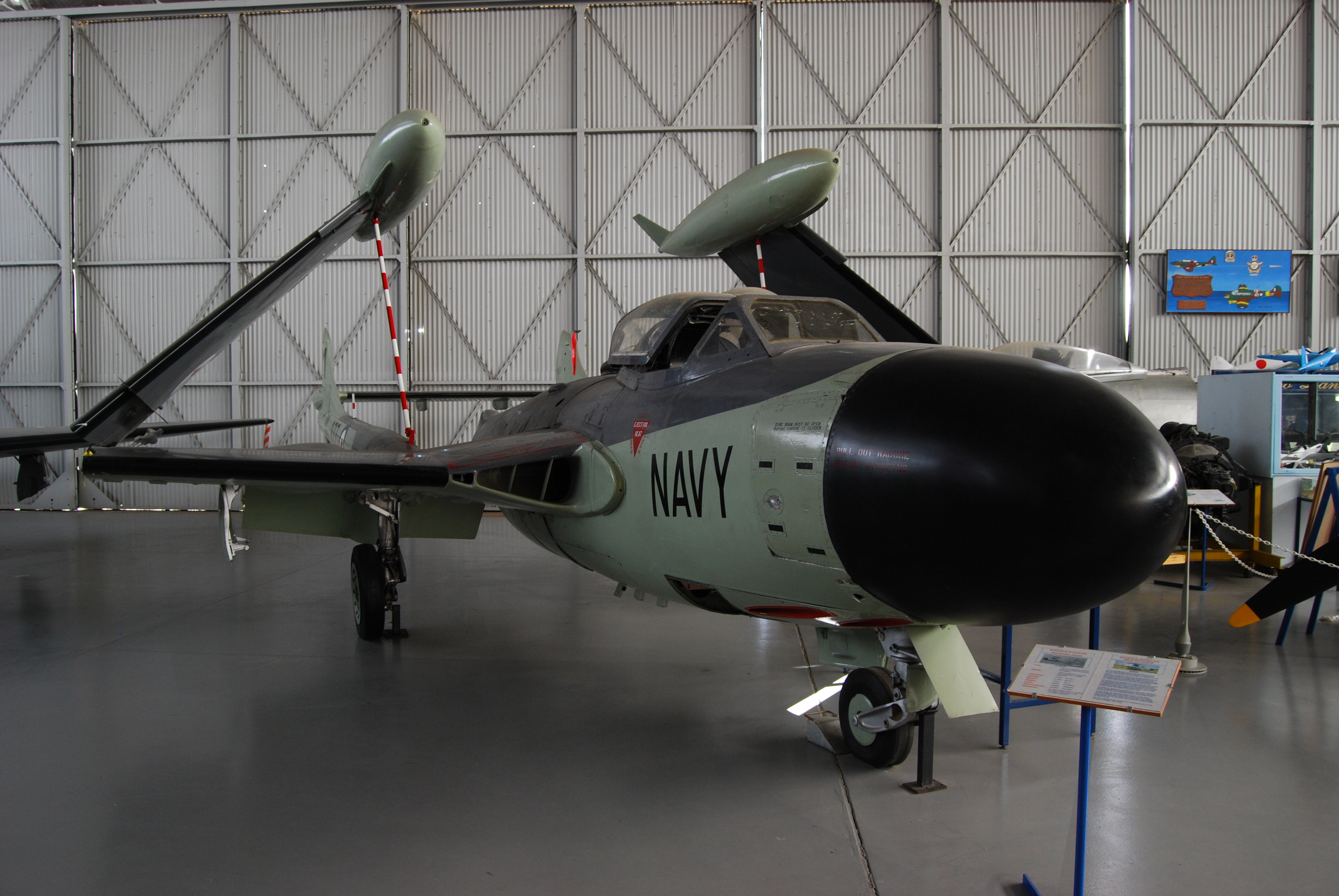
Sea Venom WZ931 at the South Australian Aviation Museum Port Adelaide

=== Sea Venom operators ===
Australia

- Royal Australian Navy Fleet Air Arm
  - 723 Squadron
  - 724 Squadron FAW.53 (1955-73)
  - 805 Squadron FAW.53 (1958-63)
  - 808 Squadron FAW.20 & FAW.53 (1955-58)

United Kingdom

- Royal Navy - Fleet Air Arm
  - 700 Naval Air Squadron FAW.20 & FAW.21 (1956-61)
  - 736 Naval Air Squadron FAW.21 (1957)
  - 738 Naval Air Squadron FAW.21 (1957-60)
  - 750 Naval Air Squadron FAW.21 & FAW.22 (1960-70)
  - 751 Naval Air Squadron FAW.21ECM (1957-58)
  - 766 Naval Air Squadron FAW.20 & FAW.21 (1955-60)
  - 787 Naval Air Squadron FAW.21 (1955-56)
  - 809 Naval Air Squadron FAW.20 & FAW.21 (1954-59)
  - 831 Naval Air Squadron FAW.21ECM & FAW.22ECM (1958-66)
  - 890 Naval Air Squadron FAW.20 & FAW.21 (1954-55 & 1956)
  - 891 Naval Air Squadron FAW.20, FAW.21 & FAW.22 (1954-61)
  - 892 Naval Air Squadron FAW.21 (1955-56)
  - 893 Naval Air Squadron FAW.21 & FAW.22 (1956-60)
  - 894 Naval Air Squadron FAW.21 & FAW.22 (1957-60)
  - Airwork FAW.20, FAW.21 & FAW.22 (1955-70)

=== Aquilon operators ===
France

- French Navy Aviation Navale (1955-66)
  - Flottille 11F
  - Flottille 16F

== Surviving aircraft ==
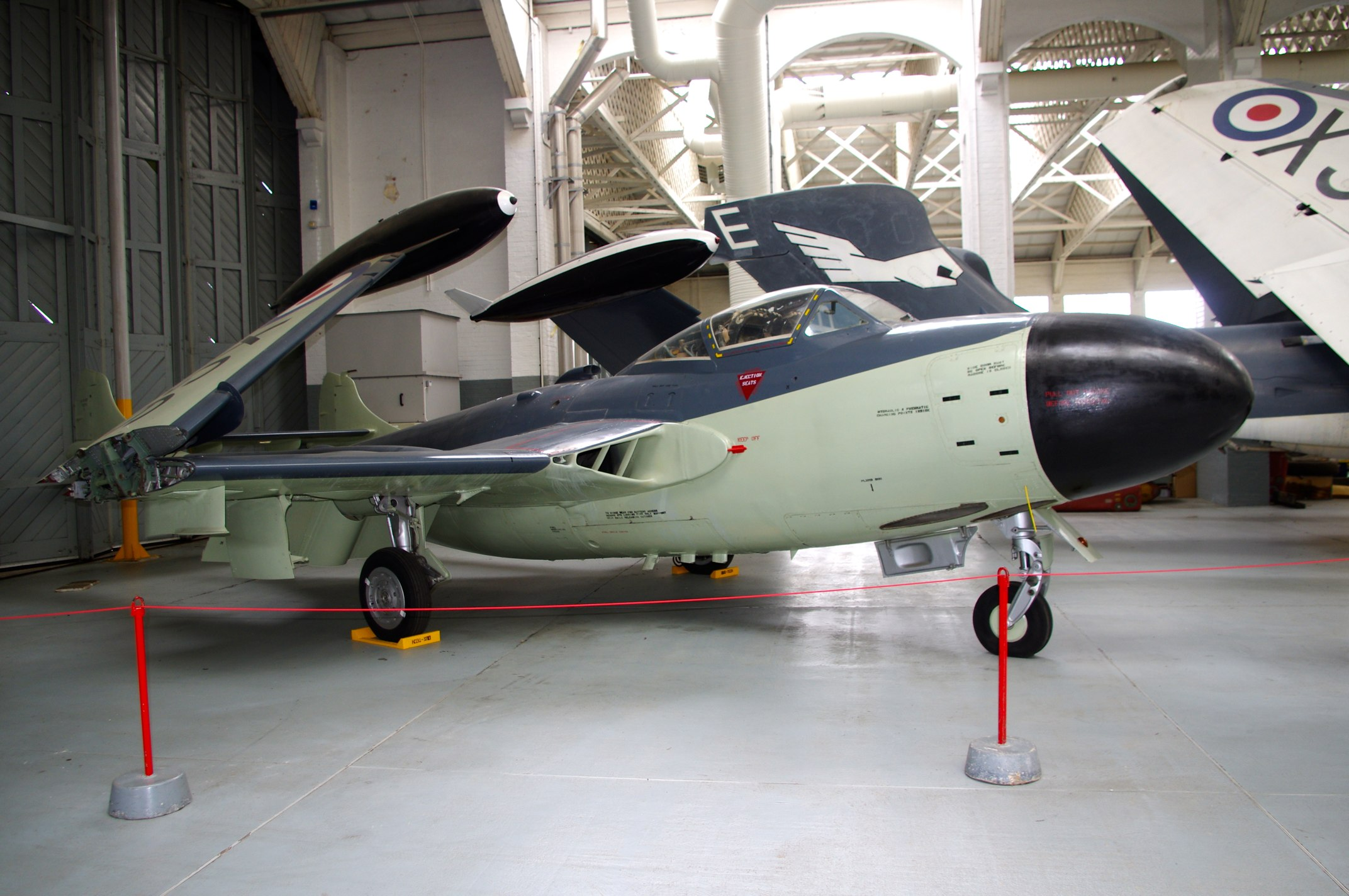
A Sea Venom at Imperial War Museum Duxford in 2011

Australia

- WZ898/WZ910 – FAW.53 on static display at the Queensland Air Museum in Caloundra, Queensland.
- WZ901 – FAW.53 on static display at the Australian National Aviation Museum at Melbourne, Victoria.
- WZ910 – FAW.53 on static display at the Queensland Air Museum in Caloundra, Queensland.
- WZ931 – FAW.53 on static display at the South Australian Aviation Museum in Port Adelaide, South Australia.
- WZ937 – FAW.53 on static display at the Fleet Air Arm Museum in Nowra, New South Wales.

France

- 53 – Aquilon 203 on display at the Museum of Naval Aeronautics in Rochefort, Charente-Maritime.

Malta

- XG691 – FAW.22 is being restored at the Malta Aviation Museum in Ta' Qali, Attard.

Poland

- XG613 – FAW.21 on static display at the Polish Aviation Museum in Kraków, Lesser Poland.

United Kingdom

- WM571 - ECM.21 on rebuild to ground running status at Classic British Jets Collection Bruntingthorpe
- WW138 – FAW.21 on static display at the Fleet Air Arm Museum in Yeovilton, Somerset.
- WW145 – FAW.22 on static display at the National Museum of Flight in East Fortune, East Lothian.
- WW217 – FAW.22 on static display at the Newark Air Museum in Newark-on-Trent, Nottinghamshire.
- XG680 – FAW.22 on static display at the North East Land, Sea and Air Museums in Sunderland, Tyne and Wear.
- XG730 – FAW.22 is being restored at the de Havilland Aircraft Museum in London Colney, Hertfordshire.
- XG737 – FAW.22 is being restored at the East Midlands Aeropark in Castle Donington, Leicestershire.

== Specifications (Sea Venom FAW.22) ==
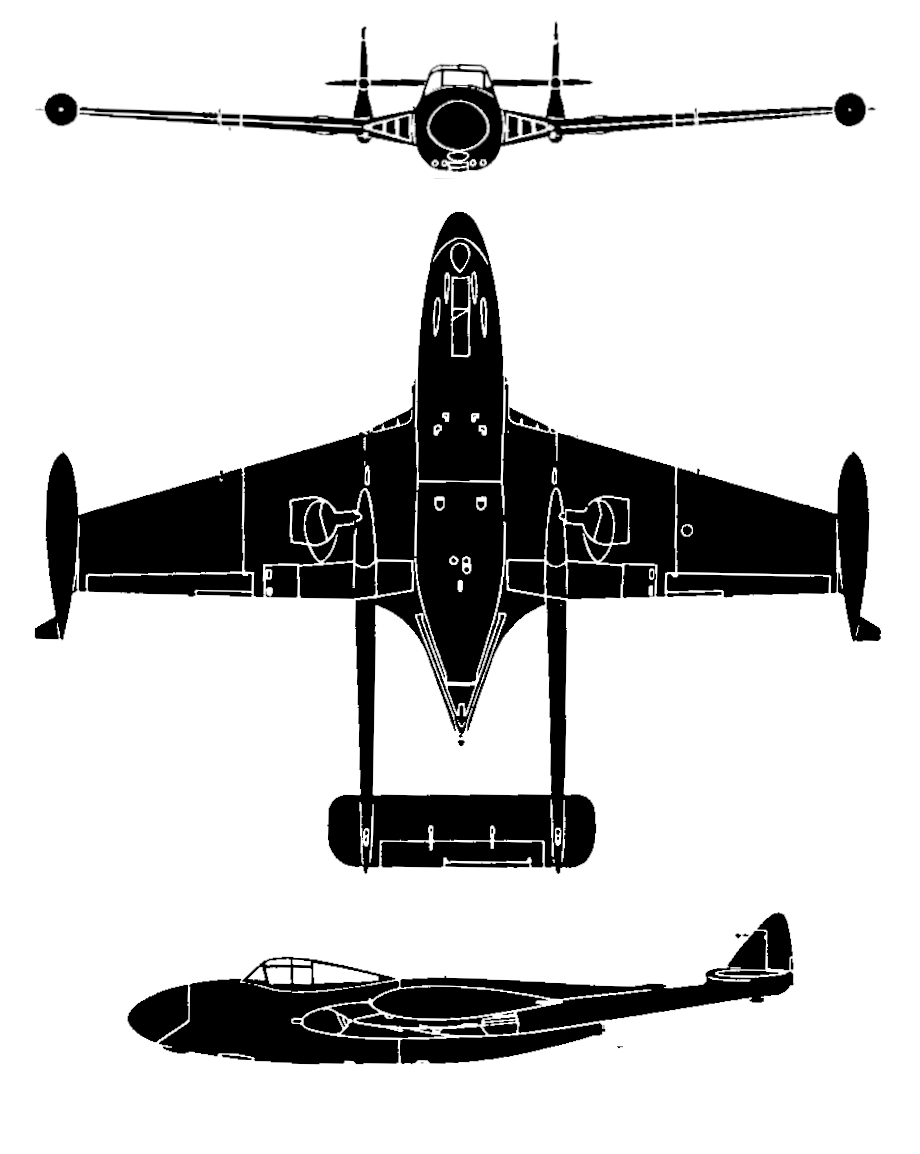
Sea Venom FAW.20 3-view drawings

Data from De Havilland's Sea Venom

General characteristics

- Crew: 2
- Length: 36 ft 7 in (11.15 m)
- Wingspan: 42 ft 11 in (13.08 m)
- Height: 8 ft 6.25 in (2.5972 m)
- Gross weight: 15,400 lb (6,985 kg)
- Max takeoff weight: 15,800 lb (7,167 kg)
- Powerplant: 1 × de Havilland Ghost 105 centrifugal-flow turbojet engine, 5,300 lbf (24 kN) thrust

Performance

- Maximum speed: 576 mph (927 km/h, 501 kn) at sea level

555 mph (482 kn; 893 km/h) at 30,000 ft (9,100 m)

- Range: 705 mi (1,135 km, 613 nmi)
- Service ceiling: 39,500 ft (12,000 m)
- Rate of climb: 5,750 ft/min (29 m/s)

Armament

- Guns: 4 × 20 mm (0.787 in) Hispano Mk.V cannon, 150 rpg
- Rockets: 8 × "60lb" RP-3 unguided rockets
- Bombs: 2 × 1,000 lb (454 kg) bombs

== See also ==
Related development

- de Havilland Sea Vixen
- de Havilland Vampire
- de Havilland Venom

Aircraft of comparable role, configuration, and era

- Avro Canada CF-100 Canuck
- Douglas F3D Skyknight
- Hawker Sea Hawk
- Lockheed F-94 Starfire
- McDonnell F2H Banshee
- Northrop F-89 Scorpion

Related lists

- List of aircraft of the Fleet Air Arm
- List of aircraft of the Royal Air Force
- List of fighter aircraft
