= 1954 Swissair Convair CV-240 crash =

1954 aviation accident

Coordinates: 51°3′25″N 1°12′25″E

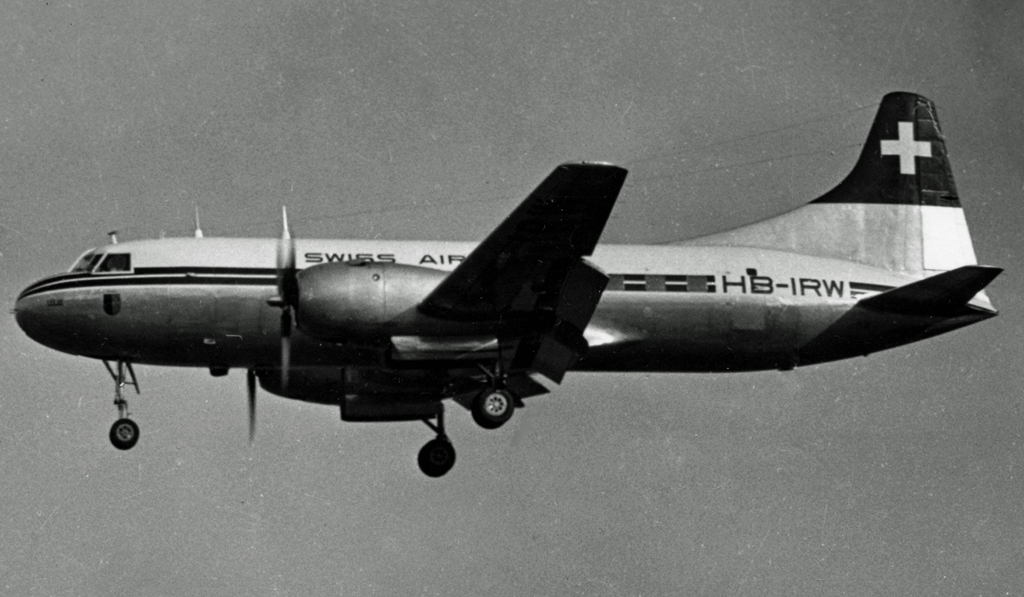
- HB-IRW, the aircraft involved, seen six days before it crashed

Accident
- Date: 19 June 1954
- Summary: Ditching due to fuel exhaustion
- Site: English Channel, off Folkestone, Kent

Aircraft
- Aircraft type: Convair CV-240
- Aircraft name: Ticino
- Operator: Swissair
- Registration: HB-IRW
- Flight origin: Cointrin Airport, Geneva, Switzerland.
- Destination: Heathrow Airport, London, United Kingdom.
- Passengers: 5
- Crew: 4
- Fatalities: 3
- Injuries: 6
- Survivors: 6

On 19 June 1954 a Swissair Convair CV-240 ditched off Folkestone, Kent when it ran out of fuel while crossing the English Channel. All on board survived the ditching, but three people who could not swim drowned. There were no lifejackets or water safety equipment on board, as regulations did not require them on short flights over water.

== Aircraft ==
The ditched aircraft was Convair CV-240 HB-IRW, c/n 61. The aircraft had first flown in 1948. Named Ticino, the aircraft had entered service with KLM, and was sold to Swissair on 28 November 1953 for CHF 2,270,000.

== Accident ==
The accident flight was a scheduled international passenger flight from Cointrin Airport, Geneva, Switzerland to Heathrow Airport, London, United Kingdom. The aircraft had previously flown from London to Geneva. While crossing the English Channel at an altitude of 12,000 feet (3,700 m), the pilot noticed that the gauges were indicating low fuel. The port engine then stopped and the propeller was feathered. The pilot initiated a diversion to RAF Manston. The starboard engine then also stopped. A successful ditching was made 1 1/2 miles (2.4 km) off Folkestone, Kent at about 11 pm.

The crash was heard by a crane driver at Folkestone Harbour, who reported the fact to the berthing master. Four British Railways staff rowed a boat out to the scene of the accident, which they reached in about 30 minutes. Five survivors were picked up and transferred to the Southern Queen, which had gone to assist. Lifeboats from Dover and Dungeness, and helicopters from RAF Manston and HMS Albion also searched for survivors. A sixth survivor was rescued by Southern Queen, with the other five being transferred to her. They were landed in Folkestone and taken to the Royal Victoria Hospital. Three of the passengers had survived the ditching, but drowned.

The body of one of the victims was discovered at St Margaret's Bay on 27 June. Another victim's body was washed up in the Netherlands. The body of the third victim had not been found by the time an inquest was held in August 1954 at Ashford, Kent. A verdict of "misadventure" was returned in the case of the two victims whose bodies had been recovered. While acknowledging the pilot's skill in successfully executing the ditching, the coroner criticized both flight crew members for their failure to assist the passengers after the ditching occurred.

== Investigation ==
The accident was investigated by the Ministry of Transport and Civil Aviation. It was discovered that the aircraft had not been refuelled at Geneva before departing for London. The fuel had been ordered, but was not delivered to the aircraft, which could hold 700 imperial gallons (3,200 L) of fuel, so it departed with what was left after fuelling in London and flying to Geneva. The captain apparently did not notice the lack of fuel on departure from Geneva.

== Consequences ==
Both flight crew were suspended by Swissair following the accident, and dismissed after the cause of the accident was established. As a response to the accident, Swissair afterwards carried lifesaving equipment on all cross-Channel flights, although the crossing took only a few minutes; this was only required by regulations when the time over water exceeded 30 minutes.

== Casualties ==
The nationalities of the casualties were -

Nationality	Crew	Passengers	Killed	Injured
United Kingdom	–	5	3	2
Switzerland	4	–	–	4
Total	4	5	3	6
