= South Australian Aviation Museum =

- Former name: South Australian Historical Aviation Museum
- Established: 1985
- Location: Port Adelaide, South Australia
- Coordinates: 34.8482°S 138.5117°E
- Type: Aerospace museum
- Website: saam.org.au

The South Australian Aviation Museum, located in Port Adelaide, South Australia, is an aviation museum which displays aircraft, aircraft engines, and rockets of relevance to South Australia, and the history of aviation and the aerospace industry in Australia.

== History ==
The museum's origins can be traced to 1984 when it was started by a group of enthusiasts interested in aviation history and aircraft restoration. In 1990 it became the official aviation museum for South Australia when it was awarded Provisional Accreditation by the History Trust of South Australia. The following year it became responsible for the State's historical aviation collection.

In 1996 the museum became the home of the heritage rocket collection associated with the Woomera Test Range in the period 1950–1980. The heritage rocket collection is the property of the Defence Science and Technology Organisation.

Following several moves, the museum was set up at its present site in 2006. A second hangar was added in 2017 to accommodate the museum's growing collection of aircraft, engines and associated displays.

== Collection ==
=== Aircraft on display ===
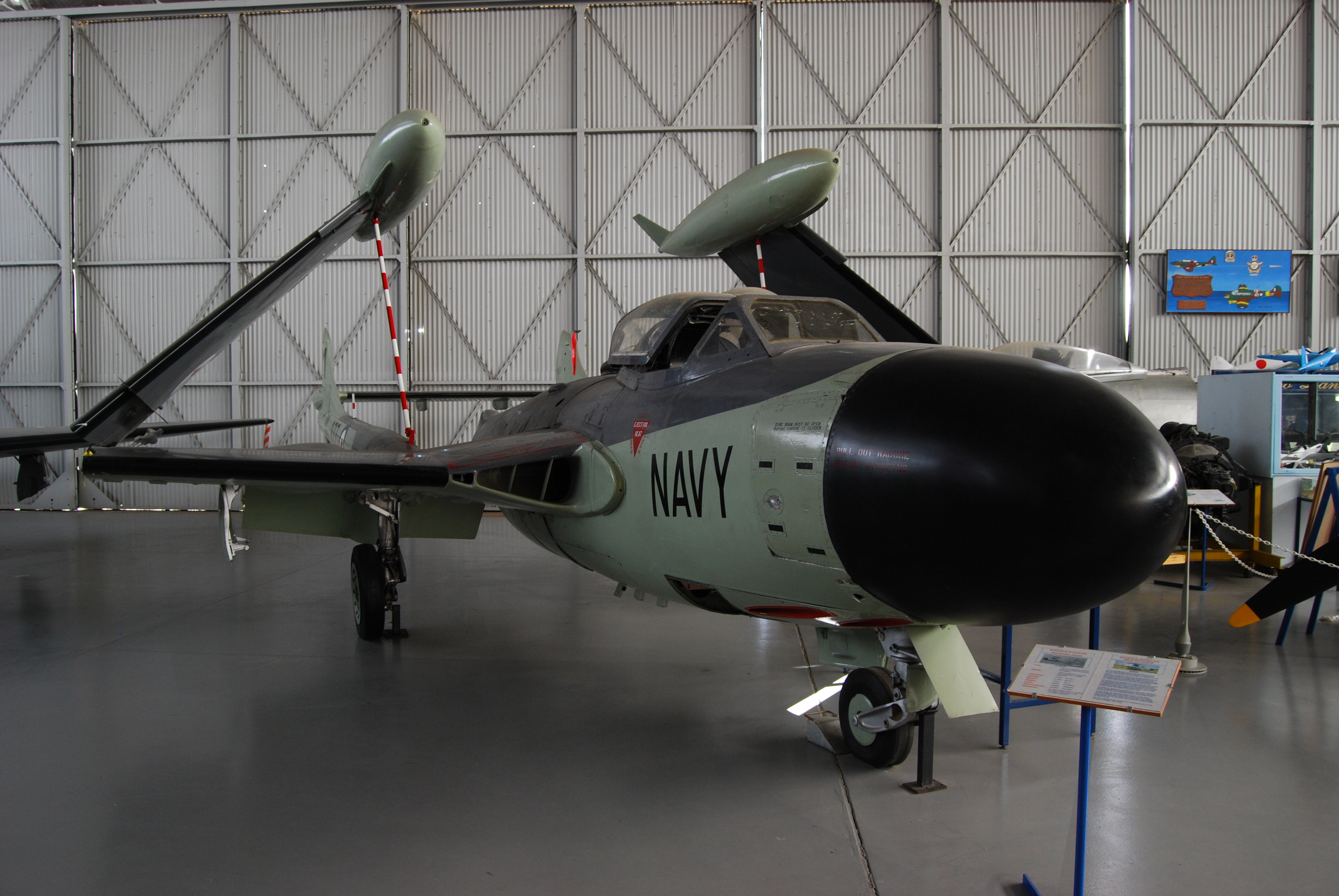
de Havilland Sea Venom at the South Australian Aviation Museum

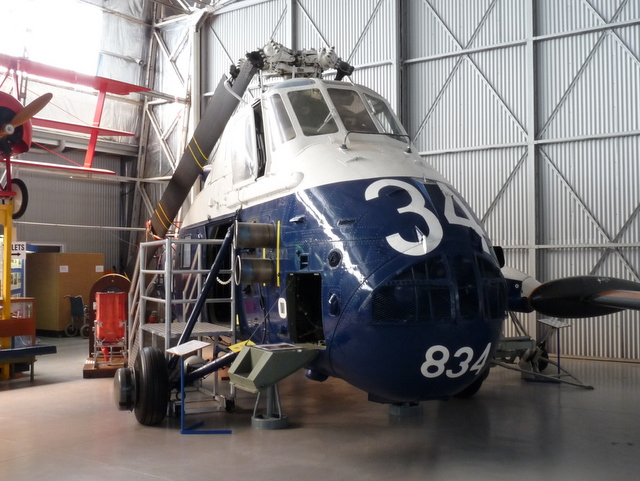
Westland Wessex at the South Australian Aviation Museum

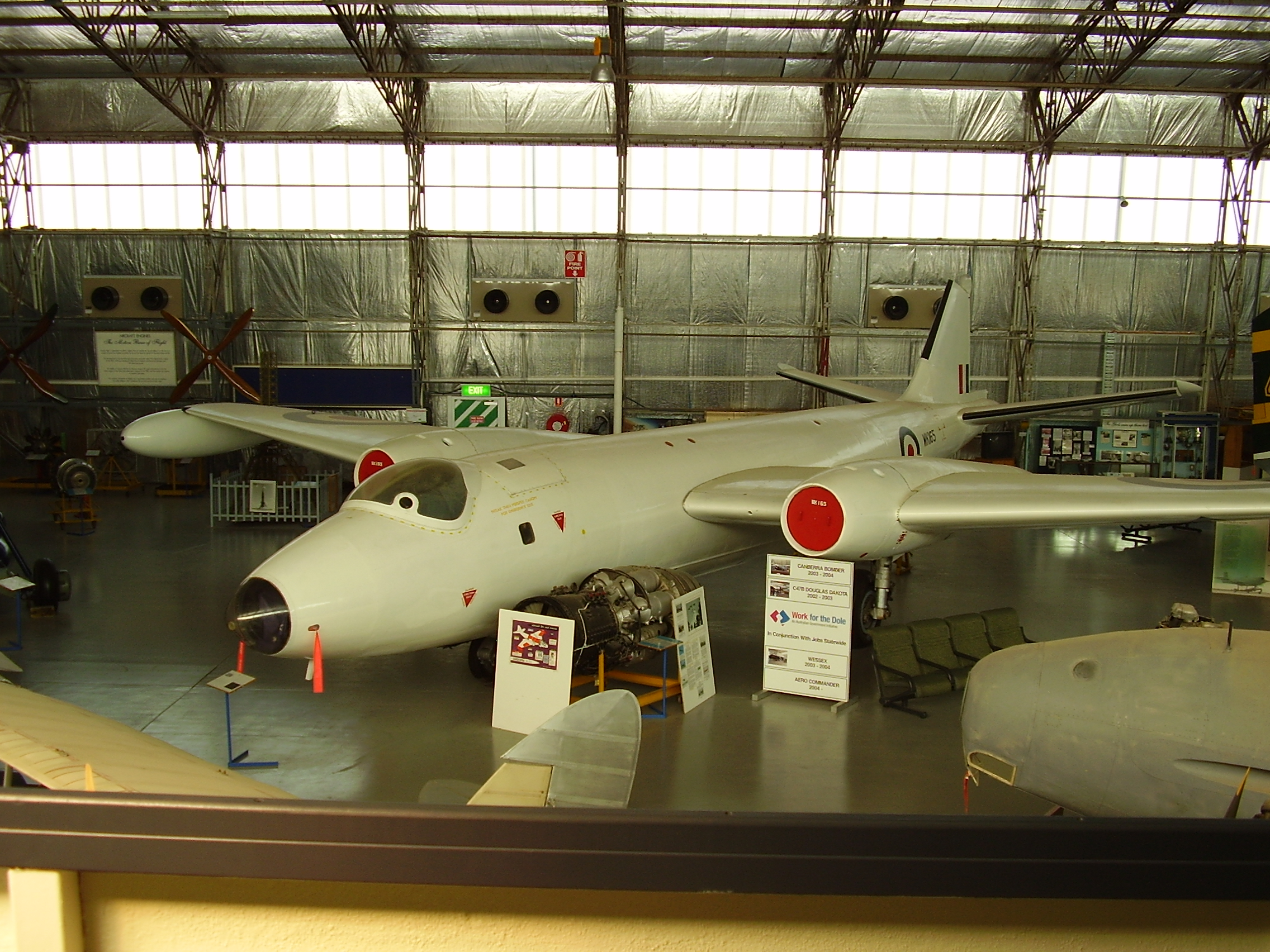
Canberra bomber at the South Australian Aviation Museum

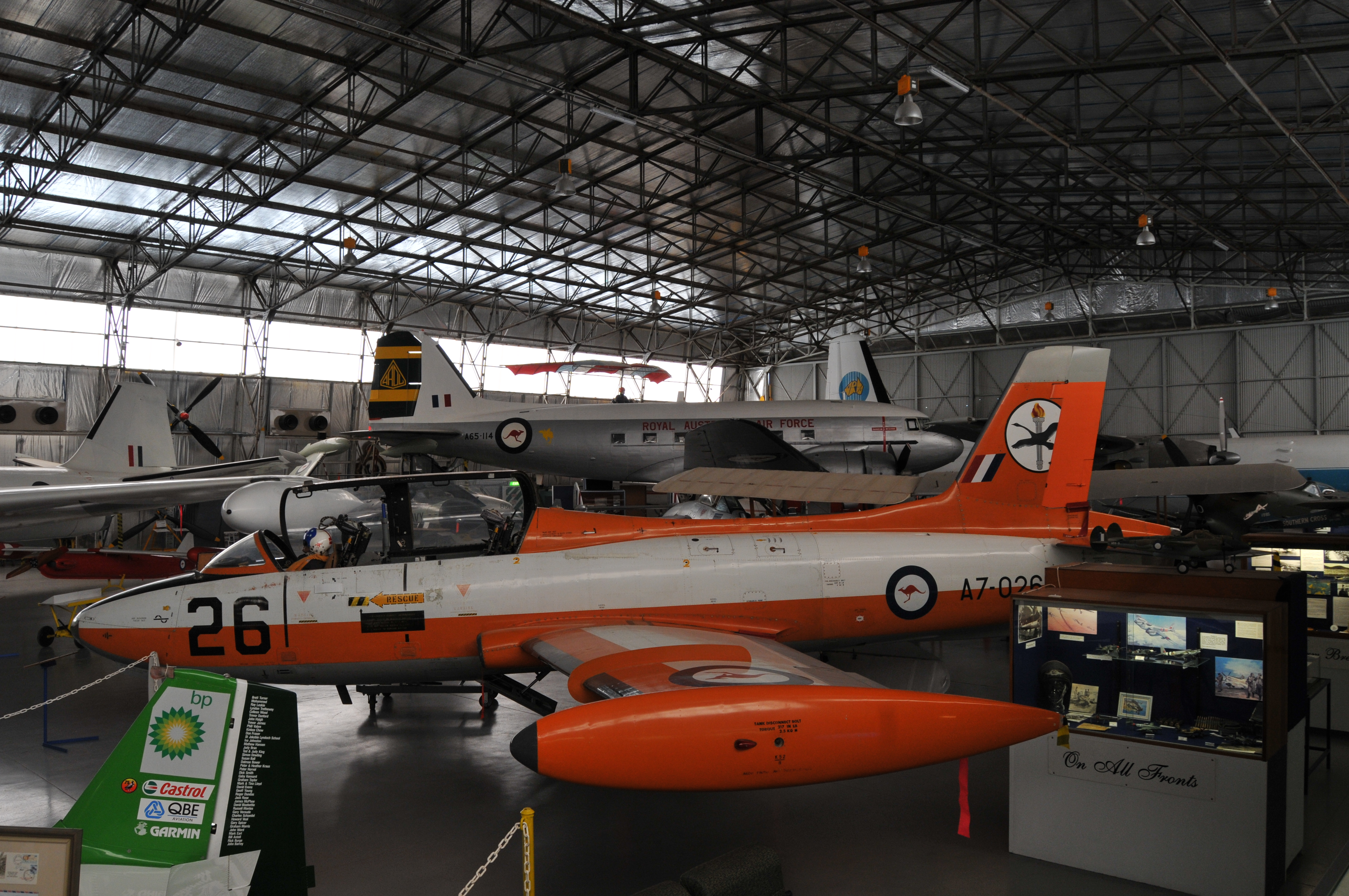
CAC CA-30 at the South Australian Aviation Museum

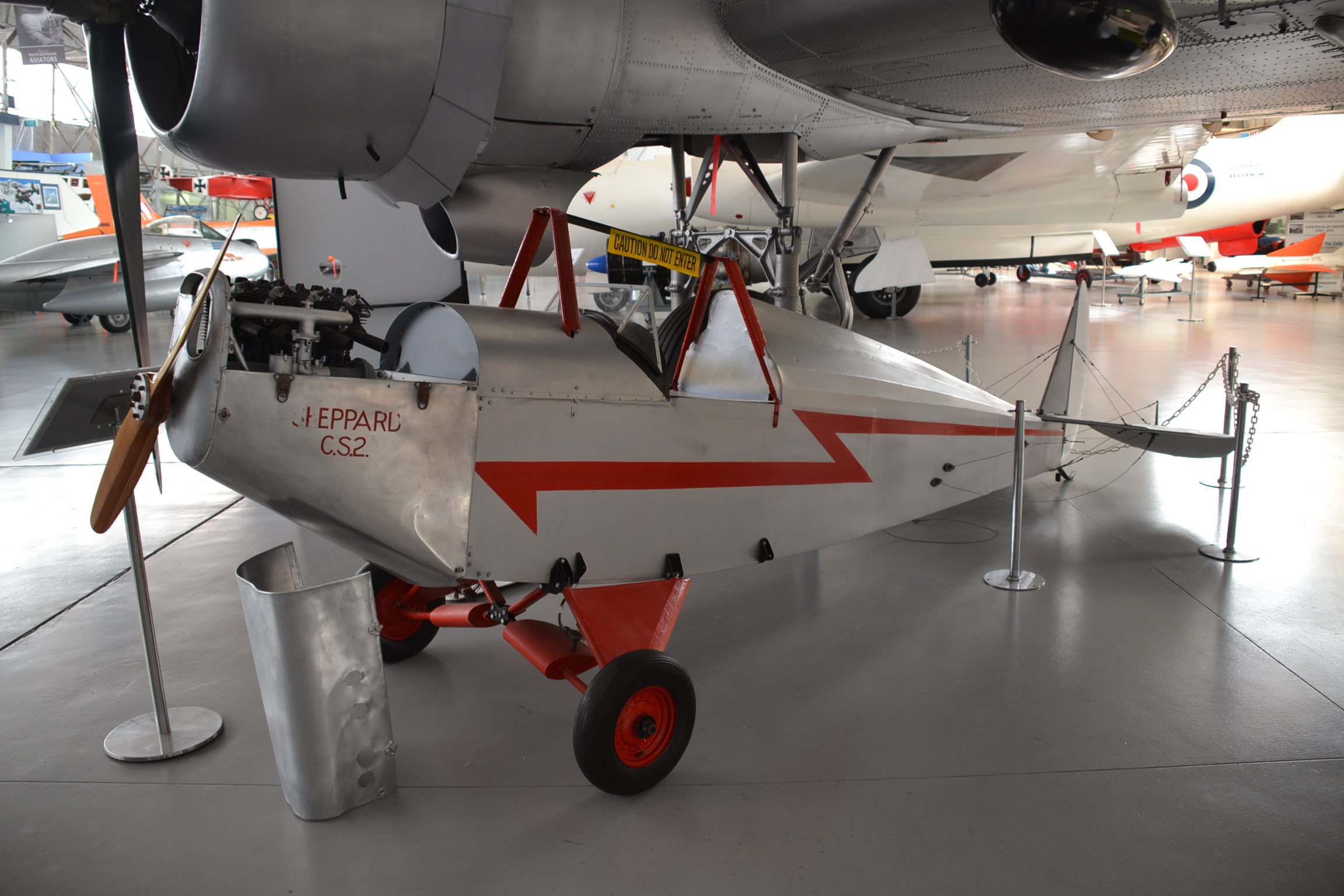
Sheppard CS2 at the South Australian Aviation Museum

- Aero Commander 680 VH-PSG
- BAe 146-300 VH-NJL
- Bell OH-58A Kiowa A17-010
- CAC CA-30 A7-026
- Cessna CC-1 – replica
- GAF Mirage IIID A3-115
- de Havilland Canada DHC-4 Caribou A4-225
- de Havilland DH.60G Gipsy Moth 1074
- de Havilland DH.100 Vampire FB.31 A79-202
- de Havilland DH.112 Sea Venom FAW.53 WZ931
- Douglas C-47B Dakota A65-114
- English Electric Canberra B.2 WK165
- English Electric Canberra T.4 WD954
- Fokker F-27-109 Friendship VH-CAT
- GAF Jindivik N11-752 – target drone
- General Dynamics F-111C A8-132
- Gloster Meteor F.8 A77-851 – cockpit
- Hall Cherokee II VH-GPR
- Lockheed AP-3C Orion A9-756
- McDonnell Douglas F/A-18 A21-32
- Piper PA-24-250 Comanche VH-DOL
- Shepard CS2
- Supermarine Spitfire Vc A58-146
- Van's RV-4 VH-NOJ
- Westland Wessex HAS.31B N7-224

=== Engines on display ===
- Allison T56A-11A
- Allison T56A-14
- Armstrong Siddeley Cheetah IX
- Armstrong Siddeley Lynx V
- Blackburn Cirrus I
- Blackburne Tomtit
- de Havilland Gipsy Queen
- Gnome Monosoupape
- Hispano-Suiza 8
- Lycoming LF507-1H
- Lycoming O-540
- Packard Liberty L-12
- Packard V-1650
- Pratt & Whitney JT3D-3
- Pratt & Whitney R-985
- Pratt & Whitney R-1340-AN2 Wasp
- Pratt & Whitney R-2000
- Rolls-Royce Avon
- Rolls-Royce Derwent
- Rolls-Royce Kestrel
- Rolls-Royce Merlin III
- Rolls-Royce Nene
- Walter Minor 6-111
- Westinghouse J34
- Wittber engine

=== Aircraft under restoration ===
- Avro Anson I EF954/AW965
- Fairey Battle N2188

== See also ==
- List of aerospace museums
