= HMS Albion (R07) =

1954 Centaur-class light fleet carrier of the Royal Navy

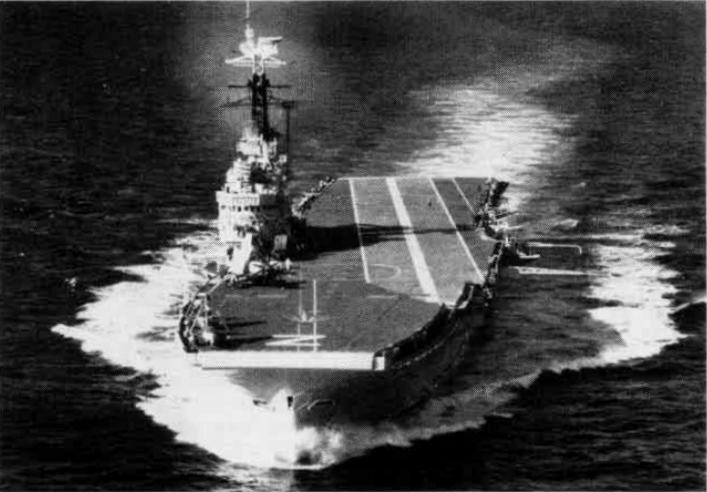
- HMS Albion in 1956

History

United Kingdom
- Name: HMS Albion
- Builder: Swan Hunter, Tyne and Wear, United Kingdom
- Laid down: 22 March 1944
- Launched: 16 May 1947
- Commissioned: 26 May 1954
- Decommissioned: 1973
- Home port: HMNB Portsmouth
- Identification: pennant number: R07
- Motto: Fortiter, Fideliter, Feliciter (Latin: Boldly, Faithfully, Successfully)
- Fate: Scrapped 1973

General characteristics
- Class & type: Centaur-class aircraft carrier
- Displacement: 22,000 tons standard, 27,000 tons full load
- Length: 737.75 ft (224.87 m)
- Beam: 123 ft (37 m)
- Draught: 27.8 ft (8.5 m)
- Propulsion: Steam turbines, 4 boilers, 2 shafts
- Speed: 28 kn (52 km/h; 32 mph)
- Range: 6,000 nmi (11,000 km; 6,900 mi) at 20 kn (37 km/h; 23 mph)
- Complement: 1596 (including air group)
- Armament: 2 sextuple Bofors 40 mm AA; 8 twin Bofors 40 mm; 4 single Bofors 40 mm; 4 single 3-pounder saluting guns
- Armour: 1 to 2-inch (51 mm) flight deck
- Aircraft carried: 42 (decreased to 26 with jet fighters)

HMS Albion (R07) was a 22,000-ton Centaur-class light fleet carrier of the Royal Navy. The ship was laid down in 1944 and launched in 1947 but did not enter service until 1954. She served in the Royal Navy into the early 1970s.

== Construction and modifications ==
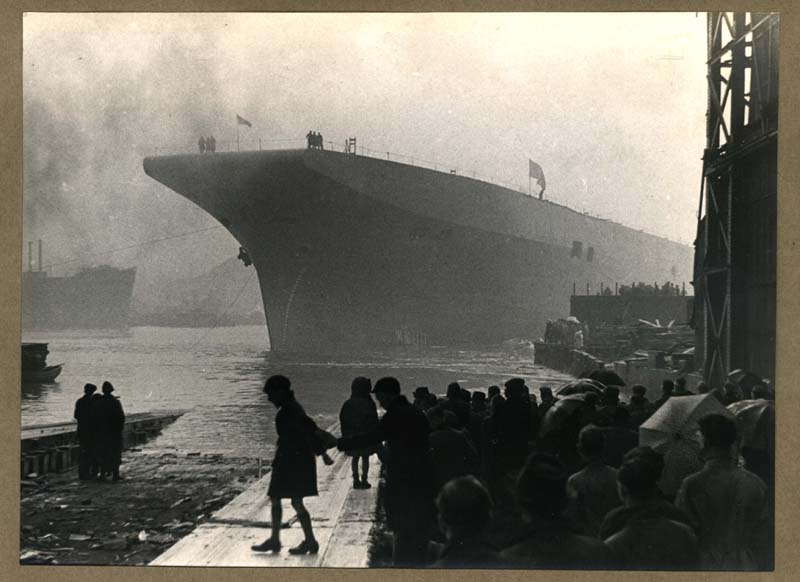
HMS Albion on the River Tyne after launch in 1947 at Swan Hunter & Wigham Richardson Ltd shipyard

She was built by Swan Hunter & Wigham Richardson Ltd. Her keel was laid down on 23 March 1944 and she was launched on 6 May 1947 by Violet Attlee, wife of the British Prime Minister Clement Attlee. On 18 October 1949, she was under tow by tugs Beamish, Hendon and George V from Jarrow to Rosyth when Albion collided with SS Maystone 4 nautical miles (7.4 km) from the Longstone Lighthouse. Maystone sank, Albion received a 225-square-foot (20.9 m^{2}) hole in her stern and started to sink. The three tugs attempted to beach her near St Abbs Head but were hampered when Hector became disabled when a tow rope wrapped around her propeller. The tug HMS Restive was sent from Rosyth to assist and the destroyer HMS St James arrived and took Hector on tow until her crew managed to clear the propeller. Albion was successfully berthed at Rosyth with 5 feet (1.5 m) of water in her engine room. She was scheduled for completion in 1951 but not fully completed until May 1954. During the night of 19–20 June 1954, helicopters from Albion assisted in the search for survivors of a Swissair aircraft that had ditched in the English Channel off Folkestone, Kent. After an initial work up with her air group, in September she joined the Mediterranean Fleet and in October became the flagship of Flag Officer Aircraft Carriers.

== Operational history ==
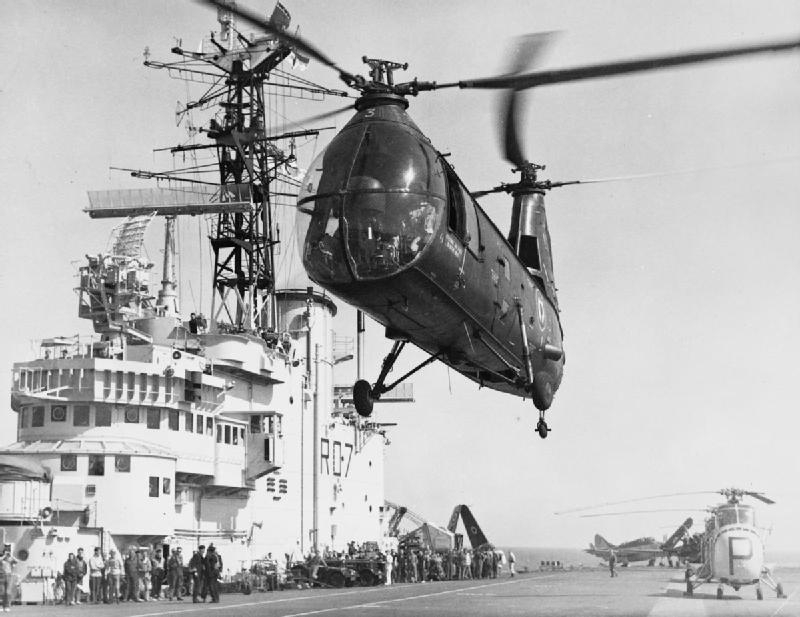
French Piasecki HUP lands on HMS Albion in 1957

In 1956, after refitting at Portsmouth, Albion returned once again to the Mediterranean Sea for operations relating to the Suez Crisis, where her air group struck key Egyptian airfields, and covered the paratroopers' landings. In July 1958, Albion embarked 42 Commando Royal Marines, with all its vehicles and additional equipment, and transported the unit to the Middle East.

Final fixed-wing complement as embarked in 1959–60:

- 806 sqn. 8 Sea Hawk FGA6 Fighter-Attack
- 894 sqn. 12 Sea Venom FAW21 Night/All Weather Fighter
- 849 sqn. D flt. 4 Skyraider AEW1 Airborne Early Warning
- 815 sqn. 8 Whirlwind HAS7 Helicopter Anti-Submarine Warfare
- Ships Flight 1 Dragonfly HR5 Helicopter Search and Rescue

The next two years saw her visit the Far East, Australia, New Zealand and the south Atlantic and Indian Oceans, before she returned to Portsmouth to pay off. She was considered as a replacement for the Australian carrier HMAS Melbourne but was rejected, and in January 1961 conversion begun for her to become a commando carrier. She recommissioned in 1962, training with 845 and 846 helicopter squadrons as well as 40 Commando Royal Marines before she joined the Far East Fleet. During this period she gained the nickname "The Old Grey Ghost of the Borneo Coast".

On 26 November 1962 she collided with a tug in Aden harbour, killing two of the tug's crew. She was a vital asset in supporting operations ashore in Borneo during the Indonesian Confrontation. In 1967 she was part of the RN task force that covered the withdrawal from Aden, and in 1971 was part of another withdrawal of British forces, this time in Singapore and the disbandment of the Far East Fleet.

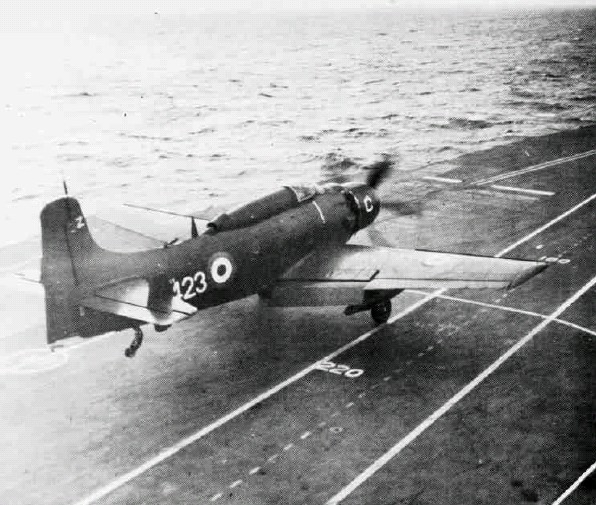
A Douglas Skyraider AEW.1 of the Royal Navy's No. 849 Squadron taking off from HMS Albion

She sailed from Portsmouth in March 1971 for the Far East, under the command of Captain James Jungius, RN. She paid a brief visit to Ascension Island before visiting Durban in April 1971. She was in Bombay from 3 to 6 May 1971 and, after a passage of nearly seven weeks the ship embarked 40 Commando Royal Marines off Changi for an exercise (set as a counter-terrorist operation in Brunei). A ceremonial entry into Singapore followed with 848 Naval Air Squadron providing a flypast as the air squadron disembarked to HMS Simbang. A month alongside in Singapore followed, for an assisted maintenance period (AMP). Having embarked the Australian Army Band, the ship sailed Singapore at the end of June for Japan, carrying out a full-power trial and encountering typhoons on passage. Albion was in Kobe from 1 to 8 July 1971 and then returned to Singapore. A night assault exercise followed in the Marang area, in company with a number of other warships and auxiliaries.

After a rough passage the ship arrived in Fremantle on 9 August 1971 for an eight-day visit, with personnel changing from tropical uniform ("whites") to blue uniform ("blues") for the Australian winter. She returned to Singapore on 23 August and had another month alongside. Sailing Singapore on 20 September, she spent two days at the U.S. Naval Base Subic Bay and arrived at Hong Kong on 30 September, where she was alongside the British naval base, HMS Tamar, until 11 October.

Back in Singapore on 15 October, her last two weeks at the Singapore Naval Base were spent storing, embarking 40 Commando Royal Marines and 848 Naval Air Squadron as part of the British withdrawal from the Far East. A farewell parade of all British armed forces represented in Singapore was held at 17:30 on 29 October 1971 at the base in Sembawang, the salute being taken by Air Chief Marshal Sir Brian Burnett. The ship sailed the next day and, on 31 October 1971, the ship was one of twenty in a steampast—and flypast—that marked the handover of the naval base to the ANZUK forces. Albion then headed west.

First call was Gan and then on to Mombasa from 14 to 22 November, where the ship underwent a week's self-maintenance period (SMP) in Kilindini harbour. She then sailed to Masirah Island and, as part of the "Gulf Covering Force", assisted with the withdrawal of British forces form the Persian Gulf. On 10 December she was detached, at full speed, to the Bay of Bengal to aid United Kingdom citizens remaining in East Pakistan during the Indo-Pakistan War but was diverted to Gan, where she arrived on 15 December. From Gan, 40 Commando Royal Marines were flown home to the United Kingdom. For the ship, it was Christmas in the Indian Ocean and New Year in Cape Town, from where she sailed on 5 January 1972. Back in home waters, she disembarked 848 Naval Air Squadron on 20 January and entered Portsmouth on 24 January 1972.

After maintenance and leave, the ship sailed from Portsmouth on 11 April 1972, embarking 848 Naval Air Squadron, for the Mediterranean. After a visit to Gibraltar, the ship was lying off Cyprus from 20 to 29 April, supporting Royal Marines in an exercise. Then followed a large NATO exercise, "Dawn Patrol", which included visits to Kavala, Greece, and Souda Bay, Crete. Returning west for home, with a brief stop at Gibraltar, the ship paid an official visit to Brest from 23 to 30 May 1972, flying the flag of the Commander-in-Chief Fleet, Admiral Sir Edward Ashmore. The ship returned to Portsmouth on the last day of May and, in the first week of June, Captain William Staveley RN assumed command.

June 1972 saw the ship carrying out demonstrations at sea for officers from the Royal College of Defence Studies and, on 14 June, she headed north for Rosyth, where the ship received a visit from the Grand Duke of Luxembourg. Having embarked 45 Commando Royal Marines and 848 Naval Air Squadron in the Firth of Forth, she sailed north for exercises in waters around the Orkney Islands. She was in Rotterdam from 28 June to 4 July 1972 and, on 8 July 848 Naval Air Squadron disembarked Albion for the last time, before the ship spent Clyde Week in Greenock. Her last United Kingdom port visit was to Dover, marking the ship's adoption by the Confederation of Cinque Ports. On 18 July, she held a Families' Day in Portsmouth before going alongside in the naval base for leave and maintenance.

In September 1972 Albion took part in Exercise "Strong Express", then the largest NATO exercise ever staged, in Norwegian waters around Harstad. Her final deployment was to Canada, and she sailed from Portsmouth on 10 October 1972, embarking 42 Commando Royal Marines and 845 Naval Air Squadron the next day. She arrived in Saint John, New Brunswick, on 19 October and landed 42 Commando for exercises ashore with Canadian forces and, two days later, Halifax, Nova Scotia, for a nine-day visit hosted by HMCS Stadacona. She began her passage along the Saint Lawrence Seaway on 31 October, arriving in Montreal two days later. With 150 sea cadets embarked, she sailed from Montreal at 08:30 on 7 November and arrived in Quebec at 20:30 the same day. Sailing 10 November, she called at Saint John on 13 November in order to recover 42 Commando, finally departing Canadian waters on 15 November and heading East across the North Atlantic. At 08:00 on 22 November, Albion anchored in Plymouth Sound and disembarked 42 Commando, 845 Naval Air Squadron and Kangaw Flight RM. Sailing from Plymouth the next day, she entered Portsmouth Harbour at 14:30 on 24 November 1972, flying her paying-off pennant, with a fly-past by 845 Naval Air Squadron. The usual activities then began before disposal of the ship: de-ammunitioning, returning equipment, the last ship's company dance (ashore), the wardroom paying-off ball and, daily, an exodus of members of the ship's company.

== Fate ==
In 1973, Albion was sold for conversion to a heavy lift vessel for North Sea oil exploration. The plan collapsed and she was instead broken up for scrap at Faslane Naval Base.

== Publications ==
- Colledge, J. J.; Warlow, Ben (2006) [1969]. Ships of the Royal Navy: The Complete Record of All Fighting Ships of the Royal Navy from the 15th Century to the Present (3rd Rev ed.). London: Chatham Publishing. ISBN 978-1-86176-281-8. OCLC 67375475.
- Hobbs, David (1996). Aircraft Carriers of the Royal and Commonwealth Navies. London: Greenhill Books. ISBN 1-85367-252-1.
- Osborne, Richard (November 2022). "Naval Air and Amphibious Operations at Suez, 1956". Marine News Supplement: Warships. 76 (11): S561–S575. ISSN 0966-6958.
