= Order fulfillment =

Response to a customer order in terms of design, manufacture and delivery

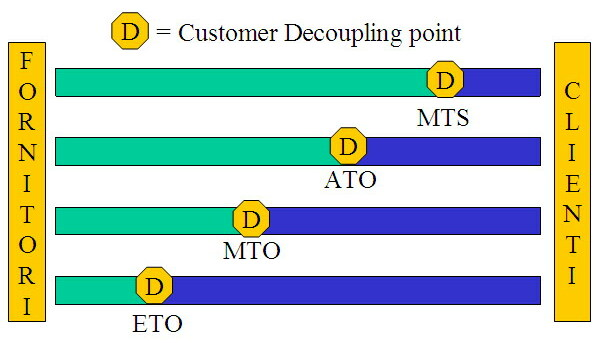
Delivery lead time is the blue bar, manufacturing time is the whole bar, the green bar is the difference between the two.

Order fulfilment (in American English: order fulfillment) is in the most general sense the complete process from point of sales enquiry to delivery of a product to the customer. OF involves generating, filling, delivering, and servicing customer orders. In some cases, it is only through this process that the customer interacts with the firm, and therefore, the order fulfillment process can determine the customer's experience. To accomplish these tasks, management must design a network and a fulfillment process that permits a firm to meet customer requests while minimizing the total delivered cost. This requires integration of logistics, marketing, finance, purchasing, research and development, and production within the firm, and coordination with key suppliers and customers. At the operational level, the order fulfillment process focuses on transactions, while at the strategic level, management can focus on making critical improvements to the process that influence the financial performance of the firm, its customers and its suppliers.

Order fulfillment is therefore of central importance in supply chain operations, and involves generating, packing, delivering, and servicing customer orders. Often the only method by which customers interact with selling firms, the order fulfillment process is a mechanism through which selling firms pursue customer service level targets, thereby directly affecting the buyer experience in various ways. The way in which the order fulfillment process is managed can determine, among other outcomes, whether orders are picked accurately from a warehouse, whether products are in stock at a store, or whether deliveries are on time to a customer's home.

== Classification ==
The first research towards defining order fulfilment strategies was published by Hans Wortmann, and was continued by Hal Mather in his discussion of the P:D ratio, whereby P is defined as the production lead time, i.e. how long it takes to manufacture a product, and D is the demand lead time. D can be viewed as:

1. The lead time quoted by the firm to the customer
2. The lead time the customer wishes it was
3. The competitive lead time

Based on comparing P and D, a firm has several basic strategic order fulfilment options:

- Engineer-to-order (ETO) - (D>>P) Here, the product is designed and built to customer specifications; this approach is most common for large construction projects and one-off products, such as Formula 1 cars.
- Build-to-order (BTO); syn: Make-to-Order (MTO) - (D>P) Here, the product is based on a standard design, but component production and manufacture of the final product is linked to the order placed by the final customer's specifications; this strategy is typical for high-end motor vehicles and aircraft.
- Assemble-to-order (ATO); syn: Assemble-to-request - (D<P) Here, the product is built to customer specifications from a stock of existing components. This assumes a modular product architecture that allows for the final product to be configured in this way; a typical example for this approach is Dell's approach to customizing its computers.
- Make-to-stock (MTS); syn: Build-to-Forecast (BTF) - (D=0) Here, the product is built against a sales forecast, and sold to the customer from finished goods stock; this approach is common in the grocery and retail sectors.
- Digital copy (DC) - (D=0, P=0) Where products are digital assets and inventory is maintained with a single digital master. Copies are created on-demand, downloaded and saved on customers' storage devices, such as research papers.

== Order fulﬁllment process ==
An order fulﬁllment process starts with receiving orders from the customers and ends with having the ﬁnished goods delivered. The order fulﬁllment cycle time is deﬁned as the period from order receipt to product delivery. The OFP is complete because it is composed of several activities, executed by different functional entities, and heavily interdependent among the tasks, resources, and agents involved in the process. This process involves the coordination of diverse activities such as sales commitment, credit checking, manufacturing, logistics, accounts receivable, and relationships with external suppliers for purchasing or shipping, which normally take place in several different business units. The main activities of the OFP can be summarized as follows:

1. Order management, which receives orders from customers and commits order requests;
2. Manufacturing, which includes production scheduling, material planning, capacity planning, and shop ﬂoor control;
3. Distribution, which considers the logistics such as inventory and transportation.

The main objectives of the OFP can be generalized into two dimensions: (1) delivering qualiﬁed products to fulﬁll customer orders at the right time and right place, and (2) achieving agility to handle uncertainties from internal or external environments.

A key element of the online order fulfillment process is the last-mile delivery of orders. Store-based retailers are not accustomed to providing this service. For decades, these retailers have successfully managed product flows from their distribution centers (DCs) to stores; however, delivering orders to customers’ homes is a relatively new responsibility for them, which they have struggled to manage. The challenges arising from differences in order fulfillment requirements and last-mile delivery have placed considerable downward pressure on store-based retailers’ financial performance. These challenges are also reflected in the differences in last-mile delivery operations among major e-commerce companies. For example, Amazon offers one-day delivery in its core Western markets as a key benefit of its Prime membership. Alibaba operates within China's dense, integrated delivery network, enabling rapid delivery, while Cainiao handles a substantial volume of parcels, reflecting the scale of the Chinese market, although its average delivery time is slightly longer than Amazon's Prime delivery standard.

In contrast, processing high volumes of small-sized online orders requires different order fulfillment activities and arrangements of resources. These pick-pack-ship activities are either labor-intensive and therefore costly or mechanized, which requires significant capital investment.

== Processes ==
In the broader sense, the possible processes in a logistic-production system are:

1. Product enquiry – Initial enquiry about offerings, visit to the web-site, catalogue request
2. Sales quote – Budgetary or availability quote
3. Order configuration – Where ordered items need selection of options or order lines need to be compatible with each other
4. Order booking – The formal order placement or closing of the deal (issuing by the customer of a Purchase Order)
5. Order acknowledgment/confirmation – Confirmation that the order is booked and/or received
6. Invoicing/billing – The presentment of the commercial invoice/bill to the customer
7. Order sourcing/planning – Determining the source/location of item(s) to be shipped
8. Order changes – Changes to orders, if needed
9. Order processing – Process step where the distribution center or warehouse is responsible to fill order (receive and stock inventory, pick, pack and ship orders).
10. Shipment – The shipment and transportation of the goods
11. Track and trace – Determine the current and past locations of the goods during transit
12. Delivery – The delivery of the goods to the consignee/customer
13. Settlement – The payment of the charges for goods/services/delivery
14. Returns – In case the goods are unacceptable/unnecessary

== Strategic importance ==
The order fulfilment strategy also determines the de-coupling point in the supply chain, which describes the point in the system where the "push" (or forecast-driven) and "pull" (or demand-driven see Demand chain management) elements of the supply chain meet. The decoupling point always is an inventory buffer that is needed to cater for the discrepancy between the sales forecast and the actual demand (i.e. the forecast error). Typically, the higher the P:D ratio, the more the firm relies on forecasts and inventories. Hal Mather suggests three ways to tackle this "planning dilemma":

1. Improve forecasting accuracy
2. Provide for flexibility
3. Build a process to recognize forecasting errors and quickly correct production planning

It has become increasingly necessary to move the de-coupling point in the supply chain to minimise the dependence on the forecast and to maximise the reactionary or demand-driven supply chain elements. This initiative in the distribution elements of the supply chain corresponds to the Just-in-time initiatives pioneered by Toyota.

The order fulfilment strategy has also strong implications on how firms customize their products and deal with product variety. Strategies that can be used to mitigate the impact of product variety include modularity, option bundling, late configuration, and build to order (BTO) strategies—all of which are generally referred as mass customisation strategies. The decoupling point can place a much stronger emphasis on the supply chain based on the process as well as the nature of supply chain configurations.

== See also ==
- Fulfillment house
