= Deborah Loewer =

American Admiral

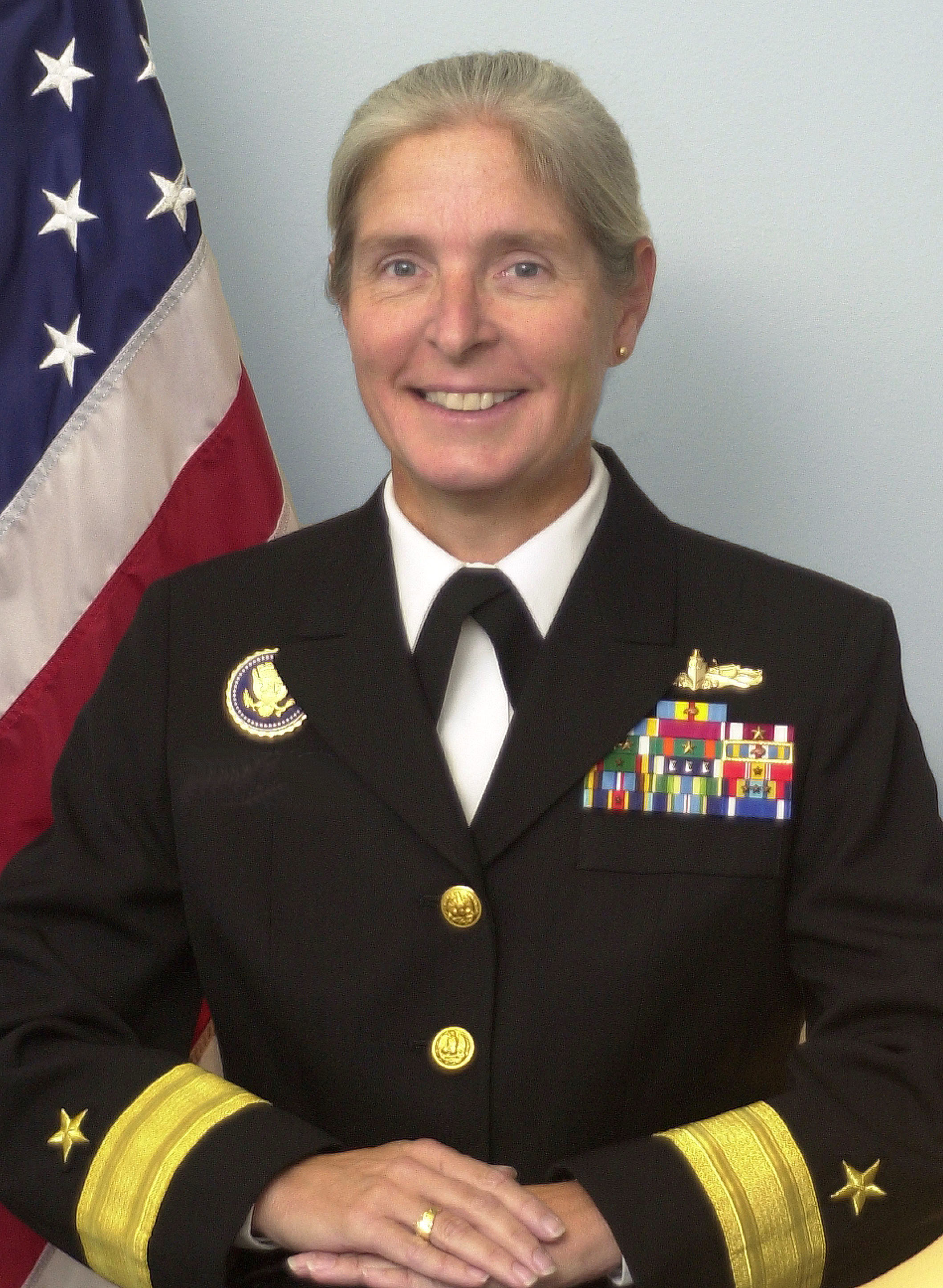
- Loewer, 2003
- Born: 1954 (age 71–72); Springfield, Ohio, U.S.
- Military career
- Allegiance: United States of America
- Branch: United States Navy
- Service years: 1976–2007
- Rank: Rear admiral
- Commands: USS Camden (AOE-2) (1998-2000); USS Mount Baker (AE-34) (1993-1995)
- Awards: Defense Distinguished Service Medal (2); Defense Superior Service Medal; Legion of Merit; Meritorious Service Medal (2); Navy and Marine Corps Commendation Medal (3); Presidential Service Badge

Deborah Ann Loewer (born 1954) is an American Admiral and the first warfare qualified woman promoted to flag rank in the United States Navy. She was frocked to the rank of rear admiral (lower half) on October 1, 2003, and retired in 2007.

== Career ==
Deborah Ann Loewer was born on 1954 in Springfield, Ohio. She was commissioned as an ensign on 17 December 1976 after graduating as the top ranking female student and second in her class of 110 students at the Officer Candidate School (OCS) in Newport, Rhode Island. She was the first female battalion commander at Naval Officer Candidate School.

From 1976 until March 1979, she served as the U.S. Navy's Pay and Allowance Functional Manager at the Bureau of Naval Personnel (PERS-3) in Washington, D.C.

She was selected to be one of the first women officers in Surface Warfare and in 1979 graduated number one in her class at the Surface Warfare Officer Basic Course in Newport, Rhode Island.

As one of the first women officers assigned to shipboard duty, then-Lieutenant, junior grade Loewer served on the destroyer tender USS Yosemite (AD-19) as electrical division officer, operations officer, navigator, and administrative officer.

Further assignments included a tour on the destroyer tender USS Yellowstone (AD-41), where as a lieutenant commander Loewer served as engineer and executive officer, and on board the fleet oiler USS Monongahela (AO-178), where she served as executive officer.

As a commander, she served as the commanding officer of the ammunition ship USS Mount Baker (AE-34) from 1993 to 1995 and, at the rank of captain, as the commanding officer of the fleet oiler USS Camden (AOE-2) from 1998 to 2000.

Shore tours included assignment as military assistant to Deputy Secretary of Defense John P. White from 1995 to 1997 and military assistant to Secretary of Defense William S. Cohen from 1997 to 1998. In September 2000, she was requested for a return tour of duty as the military assistant to Secretary Cohen. A year later, she assumed duties as Director, White House Situation Room and Director, Systems and Technical Planning Staff. She was selected for rear admiral (lower half) while she was in this position. She became vice commander of the Military Sealift Command in July 2003, headquartered in Washington, D.C. as such, Rear Admiral Loewer was second-in-command of a global transportation agency with a workforce of more than 8,000 and a fleet of more than 120 active ships whose primary mission is to move U.S. military cargo for deployed U.S. forces.

Loewer became the commander of Mine Warfare Command on 13 January 2005.

=== September 11 attacks ===
While it would usually have been the responsibility of National Security Adviser Condoleezza Rice or her deputy, Stephen Hadley, to be present on a presidential trip to handle any national security questions that might arise, in the instance of President George W. Bush's trip to an elementary school in Sarasota, Florida, in the recollection of Rice, Bush's trip was "such a short trip that we decided not to do that". In their place, they sent Loewer, a captain at the time and the director of the White House Situation Room. On September 11, 2001, between 8:46 a.m. and 8:55 a.m., Loewer was traveling in President Bush's motorcade toward Booker Elementary School when she learned of the first crash of an airplane into the World Trade Center from her deputy in the Situation Room at the White House. According to some reports, as soon as the motorcade reached the school, Loewer ran from her car to Bush's car, and informed Bush of what would become a series of terrorist attacks on the United States that day.

== Awards and decorations ==
- Defense Distinguished Service Medal with Gold Star
- Defense Superior Service Medal
- Legion of Merit
- Meritorious Service Medal with Gold Star
- Navy and Marine Corps Commendation Medal with two Gold Stars
- Presidential Service Badge

== Education ==
Loewer received her Bachelor of Science degree in theoretical mathematics and computer science from Wright State University in 1976. She was selected as an Olmsted Scholar and studied at the Defense Language Institute in Monterey, California, and the Goethe Institute in Stuttgart, Germany. Upon graduation, she went on to earn her Ph.D. in international law from the University of Kiel in Kiel, Germany, in 1986.

== See also ==
- Women in the United States Navy
