= USS Santa Barbara =

USS Santa Barbara was the name of two ships in the United States Navy. These ships were named for the city of Santa Barbara, California.

- USS Santa Barbara (ID-4522) a steel freighter, built during 1916, which served from 1918 until 1919.
- USS Santa Barbara (AE-28), a Kilauea-class ammunition ship that served from 1970 until 1998.
- USS Santa Barbara (LCS-32), an Independence-class littoral combat ship.
