= Order (business) =

Buyer's intention to purchase goods and services from a seller

In business or commerce, an order is a stated intention, either spoken or written, to engage in a commercial transaction for specific products or services. From a buyer's point of view it expresses the intention to buy and is called a purchase order. From a seller's point of view it expresses the intention to sell and is referred to as a sales order. When the purchase order of the buyer and the sales order of the seller agree, the orders become a contract between the buyer and seller.

Within an organization, it may be a work order for manufacturing, a preventive maintenance order, or an order to make repairs to a facility.

In many businesses, orders are used to collect and report costs and revenues according to well-defined purposes. Then it is possible to show for what purposes costs have been incurred.

== Spoken orders ==
Businesses such as retail stores, restaurants and filling stations conduct business with their customers by accepting orders that are spoken or implied by the buyer's actions. Taking a shopping cart of merchandise to a check-out counter is an implied intent to buy the merchandise. Placing a take-out or eat-in order at a restaurant is a spoken purchase order. Putting gasoline in one's tank at a filling station is an implied order. The seller usually expects immediate payment by cash, check or credit card for these purchases, and the seller provides the buyer with a receipt for the payment. In legal terms, this form of business order is an "implied in fact contract".

== Steps in commercial orders ==
In commerce, various business documents are used to record the negotiation of an agreement to buy and sell, record the agreement itself, and record compliance with the agreement and closure of the contract. An agreement to buy and sell is a form of contract.

Terry Hill, in Manufacturing Strategy: Texts and Cases, distinguishes between "order qualifiers" and "order winners". In his analysis, businesses aiming to win commercial orders must secure for themselves a potential role as a supplier to each customer through strategic development of its capabilities and characteristics (the "order qualifiers") which might include achieving the quality standards or "preferred supplier" status which the customer is looking for, but then in order to win actual orders, other factors are important, those which give one business superiority to its competitors, which may be about cost, delivery timescale, or more exact match to the requirements of each customer.

Once an order has been "won", there are five basic requirements for a contract to exist between two parties: agreement, voluntary, consideration, capacity, and legality. A sixth requirement of "in writing" sometimes applies.

The main concern for commercial orders is that there must be agreement (offer and acceptance) for the order to be a contract. Prior to this, businesses often record the details of negotiations by using a request for quotation, request for bid, sales quotation, or sales bid. Quotations are non-binding and part of the negotiation process. A request for bid can be binding or non-binding, depending on the terms of the bid.

Once an agreement or contract is in place, businesses record these as confirmed purchase orders and confirmed sales orders.

Commerce	Buyer's Action	Seller's Action
Buyer wanting the product and seller selling the product	Search for vendors (sellers) of the product	Marketing and advertising
Check product pricing, availability, specifications, delivery costs	Request for Quotation or Request for Bid	Sales quote or bid created
Buyer and seller agree to transaction	Purchase order recorded	Sales order recorded
Product is shipped from seller to buyer		Packing slip, pro forma invoice for certain international shipments
Buyer receives product from seller	Packing slip and product is checked with purchase order; product is checked for good condition	
Seller sends invoice to buyer	Match packing slip with purchase order and invoice; record purchase in financial accounts under accounts payable	Record sales order in financial accounts under accounts receivable
Buyer pays seller	Pay by cash, check or electronic payment; record payment on purchase order	Receive cash, check or electronic payment; record payment on sales order

== Uniform Commercial Code ==
In the US, Article 2 of the Uniform Commercial Code covers commercial contracts, and section 2-103 gives definitions of terms under this code. Section 2-106 describes the difference between a present sale (recorded as a sales order) and a sale (recorded as a transfer of title to the buyer).

(1) In this Article unless the context otherwise requires "contract" and "agreement" are limited to those relating to the present or future sale of goods. "Contract for sale" includes both a present sale of goods and a contract to sell goods at a future time. A "sale" consists in the passing of title from the seller to the buyer for a price (Section 2-401). A "present sale" means a sale which is accomplished by the making of the contract.

== Aggregate level of orders ==
In their "Advance Monthly Sales for Retail Trade and Food Services", the US Census Bureau publishes estimates of US retail and food services sales. These "sales" are orders that have been filled; payment has been made or is an account receivable. In their "Preliminary Report on Manufacturers' Shipments, Inventories and Orders", the US Census Bureau publishes statistics for "new orders", shipments, "unfilled orders" and inventories for manufactured durable goods. This gives an indication whether trade is increasing or decreasing for manufactured durable goods in the US.

== See also ==
- Backlog (disambiguation)
- Bill of sale
- Contract of sale
- Delivery order
- Distribution (business)
- Marketing
- Replenishment (disambiguation)
- Supply chain
