= USS Butte (AE-27) =

Kilauea-class ammunition ship in the United States Navy

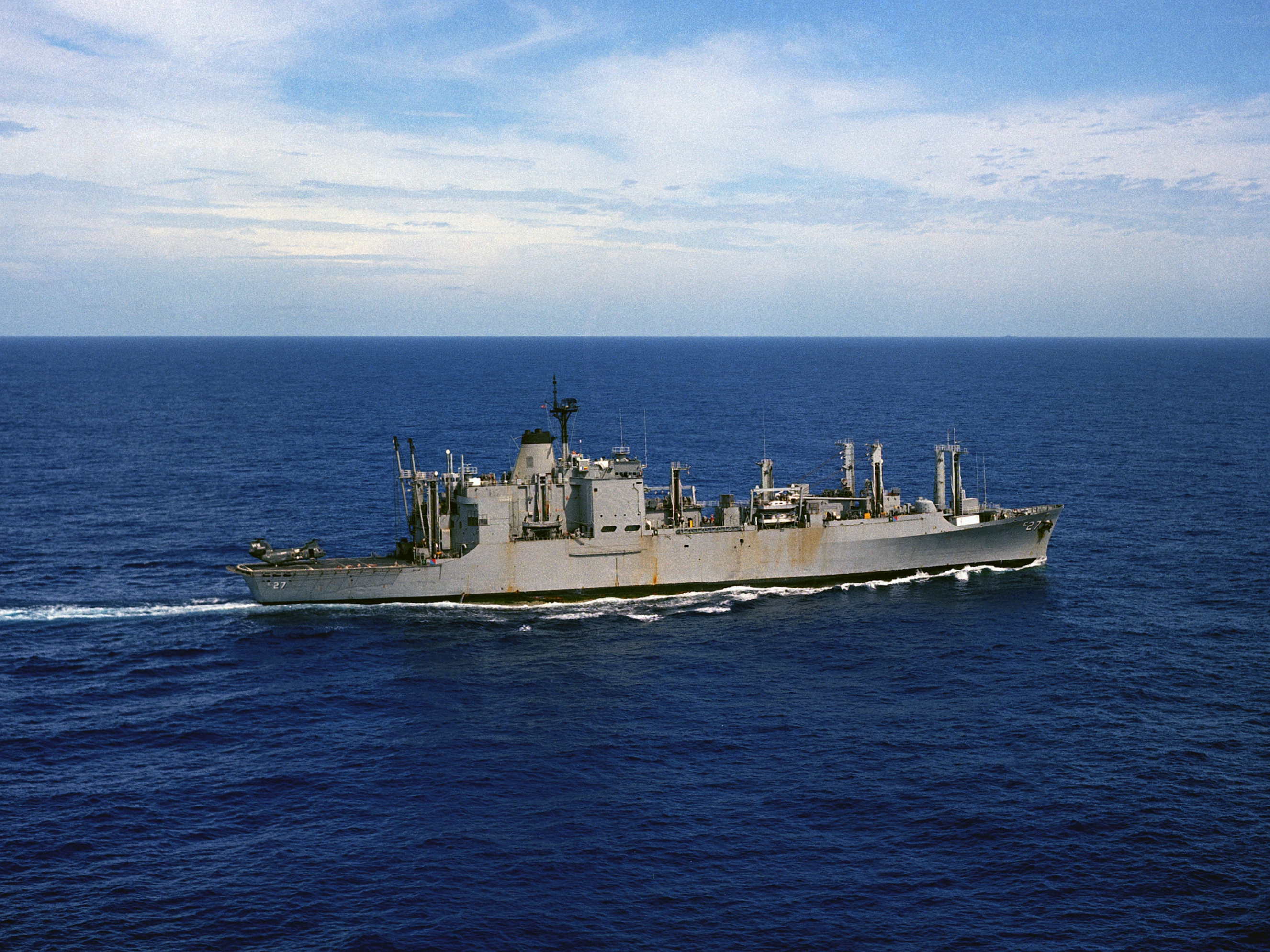
- The USS Butte underway

History

United States
- Name: USS Butte
- Namesake: Butte, Montana
- Ordered: 30 March 1965
- Laid down: 21 July 1966
- Launched: 9 August 1967
- Commissioned: 14 December 1968
- Decommissioned: 3 June 1996
- In service: Transferred to the MSC
- Out of service: 24 May 2004
- Stricken: 24 May 2004
- Home port: Norfolk, Virginia (original); Naval Weapons Station Earle (last)
- Motto: "We keep the guns loaded"
- Fate: Sunk as a target 3 July 2006

General characteristics
- Class & type: Kilauea-class ammunition ship
- Displacement: Light: 10,524 tons; Full load: 20,068 tons
- Length: 564 ft (172 m)
- Beam: 81 ft (25 m)
- Draught: 30 ft (9.1 m)
- Propulsion: 3 × boilers; steam turbines; single shaft; 22,000 shp
- Speed: 20 knots (37 km/h)
- Complement: As AE-27: 28 officers, 388 enlisted; as T-AE-27: 125-133 civilian crew, 7-24 military
- Armament: As AE-27: two Phalanx CIWS; as T-AE-27: none
- Aircraft carried: 2 CH-46 Sea Knight helicopters

The second USS Butte (AE-27) was a Kilauea-class ammunition ship in the United States Navy. She was laid down 21 July 1966 by General Dynamics Quincy Shipbuilding Division at Quincy, Massachusetts, and was christened and launched 9 August 1967. She was commissioned on 14 December 1968 in the Boston Naval Shipyard and assigned to the U.S. Atlantic Fleet, originally homeported in Norfolk, Virginia.

== Service history ==
During the crisis in Jordan in 1970, Butte was awarded a Meritorious Unit Commendation for her peacekeeping role in that operation.

From December 1972 to July 1973 she operated in the Tonkin Gulf and was awarded the Vietnam Service Medal with one battle star.

Shortly after getting underway from Norfolk on 3 September 1974, Butte suffered a major fire in the main switchboard, disrupting all ship support electrical supply. She was towed back to the naval base for repairs which included replacing the switchboard.

In July 1978, Butte's homeport was temporarily shifted to Brooklyn, New York, where she underwent a major overhaul. In June 1979, her homeport then became Naval Weapons Station Earle, New Jersey. Butte was awarded the Navy Expeditionary Medal for a 1981 Indian Ocean deployment which also took her to the Mediterranean. A 1983 deployment took Butte to the shores of Beirut, Lebanon, where she was awarded the Armed Forces Expeditionary Medal for her support of U.S. Embassies overseas, including those in Beirut, Lebanon, and Tunis, Tunisia. An evening incident on 9 November 84 had USS BUTTE and USS COONTZ firing on a surface contact that sped towards BUTTE AND COONTZ, pursuing them even as they engaged in evasive maneuvers. This occurred approximately 50 miles west of Lebanon in international waters. It was uncertain if the contact was sunk by the naval gunfire. During a 1984-85 Mediterranean deployment, she was rated as best ship in Service Squadron Two and, in May 1985, was awarded the Battle Efficiency "E" in Engineering, Damage Control, Command Control and Communications, Navigation/Deck Seamanship and Fleet Support. Butte underwent another major overhaul in Mobile, Alabama, from August 1985 to May 1986. Butte was a big part of Operation Goldenrod during a 1987 Mediterranean deployment when she helped with the arrest of two Lebanese terrorists in international waters off the coast of Lebanon. Butte was the staging platform for the FBI Hostage Rescue Team (HRT). From the Butte the HRT team launched in CH 46 helicopters to effect the arrest of Fawaz Younis, a Lebanese member of Hezbollah involved in a terrorist hijacking of an airplane in 1985. After his arrest aboard a yacht in the Eastern Mediterranean Sea, he was transported to the Butte. Butte then steamed at flank speed to rendezvous with the USS Saratoga aircraft carrier. From the Saratoga he was flown 13 hours backer to the United States to stand trial.

Butte was in Brooklyn, NY for a short Phased Maintenance refitting yard period from April 1990 to September 1990 while Operation: Desert Shield was conducted. During the Brooklyn yard period, the ship was outfitted to accommodate its new female crew members. The shipyard allegedly did substandard repair work on the ship, and went bankrupt while the ship was in dry dock. The U.S. Navy sent the Butte to the shipyards at Naval Station Philadelphia for inspection of work already done by the Brooklyn yard and to finish the repair work. That was from late 1990 til January 1991 and the beginning of the Gulf War. The Butte was still in Earle when the War ended. The Butte would later spend a month off the coast of Cuba near Guantanamo Bay for pre-deployment Damage Control and firefighting training. The Butte did in fact, deploy to the Mediterranean in support of continuing operations in the Persian Gulf and Kuwait, and the crew received the Southwest Asia Service ribbon.

== Final deployment ==
In September 1995, Butte began her last deployment as part of the USS America battlegroup. She spent October 1995 operating in the Adriatic Sea, supporting air strikes in Bosnia as part of Operation Deliberate Force. The ship also visited Cannes, France, as the U.S. Navy's representative to the annual Admiral de Grasse birthday celebration. In mid-November, Butte headed south through the Suez Canal into the Red Sea. The ship delivered turkeys and other supplies for holiday meals to United States embassies in Jordan, Eritrea, Yemen and Djibouti. Upon departure from the Persian Gulf, Butte returned to the Adriatic, supporting the NATO Peace Implementation Forces in Operation Joint Endeavor. Between operations in the Adriatic in January and February, she spent her time completing ammunition exchanges and "rollback" among the ammunition facilities in the Mediterranean. On her way home across the Atlantic in February 1996, Butte and America conducted the last underway replenishment operation for America prior to her decommission. Butte was scheduled to return to port on 24 February 1996, however, offsetting winds around Sandy Hook, kept her from entering port until 3 days later.

== Decommissioning ==
She was decommissioned on 3 June 1996 and placed in service with the Military Sealift Command, where she became USNS Butte (T-AE-27). Like five of the six other ships of her class, she was overhauled upon the transfer: accommodations were improved, the main armament was taken out and she was outfitted for reduced civilian crewing. On 24 May 2004, she was put out of service by the MSC, stricken from the Naval Vessel Register and transferred to the NAVSEA Inactive Ships Maintenance Facility in Philadelphia awaiting her disposal. On 3 July 2006, the ex USS Butte was sunk as a target off the east coast of the United States using Harpoon missiles, a Mark 48 torpedo fired from the USS San Juan and EOD explosives. Coincidentally, the previous USS Butte was also sunk deliberately in 1948 after use as a target ship in Operation Crossroads.
