= USS Flint (AE-32) =

US Navy ammunition ship

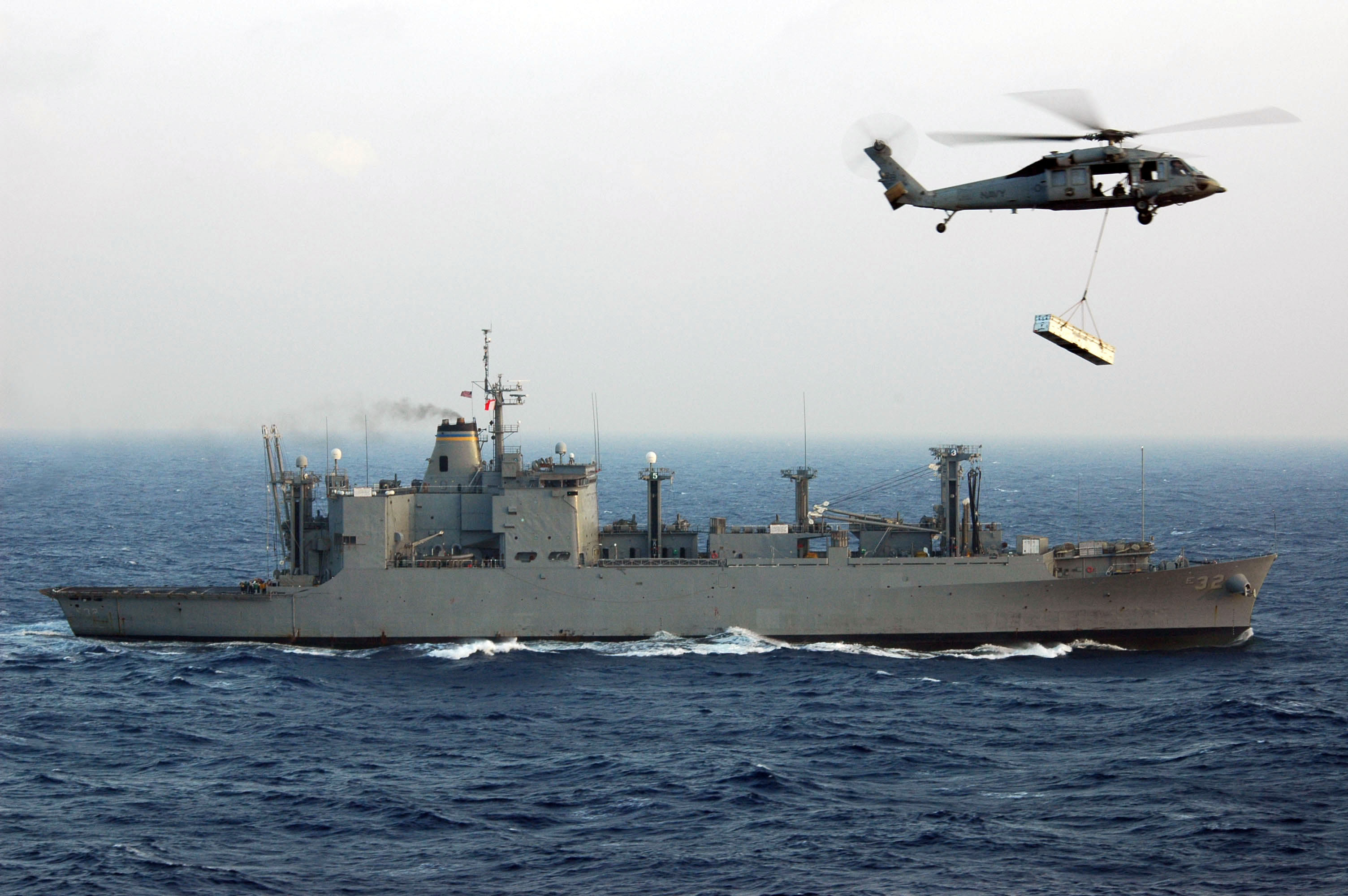
- USNS Flint (T-AE-32)

History

United States
- Name: USS Flint
- Awarded: 8 March 1968
- Builder: Ingalls Shipbuilding
- Laid down: 4 August 1969
- Launched: 9 November 1970
- Acquired: 30 August 1971
- Commissioned: 20 November 1971
- Decommissioned: 4 August 1995
- In service: Transferred to Military Sealift Command 4 August 1995
- Identification: Callsign: NFPW
- Motto: Judicemur Agendo; ("Let us be judged by our deeds")
- Fate: Sold for scrap 24 November 2015

General characteristics
- Class & type: Kilauea-class ammunition ship
- Displacement: 11,915 long tons (12,106 t) light; 20,169 long tons (20,493 t) fully loaded
- Length: 564 ft (172 m)
- Beam: 81 ft (25 m)
- Draft: 29 ft (8.8 m)
- Speed: 20 knots (37 km/h; 23 mph)
- Complement: 28 officers and 375 enlisted

USS Flint (AE-32/T-AE-32) is a Kilauea-class ammunition ship of the United States Navy, and was named after the sparking rock flint (not, as is commonly thought, the city of Flint, Michigan). Flint was constructed at the Ingalls Nuclear Shipbuilding Division, Litton Industries, Inc., Pascagoula, Mississippi. The ship was delivered to the United States Navy at Charleston, South Carolina, on 30 August 1971.

== Design ==
Flint is capable of underway replenishment at a sustained speed of 20 knots, which enables her to keep pace with fast-moving naval task forces. Her modern transfer-at-sea facilities included the capability of utilizing two CH-46 Sea Knight helicopters for vertical replenishment (VERTREP). Normal alongside methods were improved by the installation of a ram tension wire system called STREAM – Standard Tensioned Replenishment Alongside Method. Flint's holds were specifically configured for ease of handling, loading and stowing of missiles, rocket boosters, and all types of munitions required by the Fleet. Flint is capable of providing living accommodations for more than 400 men and women.

Several new design innovations were incorporated in Flint, including a bulbous bow for better streamlined hull. Another innovation was the APS (Automated Propulsion System) essentially a central console in an air conditioned space in the engine room which gives automatic readings of the performance of the engineering plant and allowed the bridge to directly control the engines.

== Service history ==
USS Flint was commissioned following extensive sea trials. The ship then made a transit through the Panama Canal to its home port of Naval Weapons Station, Concord, California.

Flint made its first Western Pacific (WestPac) deployment in fall of 1972. It participated in numerous underway replenishment activities with ships of the US 7th Fleet in support of military operations off the coast of Vietnam including resupply of gunline destroyers and aircraft carriers participating in Operation Linebacker and Operation Linebacker II. Its helicopter detachment flew hundreds of sorties ferrying munitions to US naval ships in the operational theatre.

In subsequent deployments in 1973–1974 and 1974–1975, Flint was assigned to naval forces in the Gulf of Aden in support of operations monitoring the Yom Kippur War, the Vietnam evacuation task force (Operation Frequent Wind) and rescue forces involved in the Mayagüez incident.

Flint served as ammunition supply ship during operations Desert Shield and Desert Storm, 1990 to 1992. A 22-year-old machinist mate, Thomas Mosley lost his life tragically while on board in October 1993. It is the only known death occurring while doing weapons elevator maintenance.

Flint completed 15 deployments to the western Pacific and received recognition for the dramatic 1978 rescue of 86 fishermen shipwrecked near Palawan Island, Philippines, during a typhoon.

== Decommissioning and transfer ==
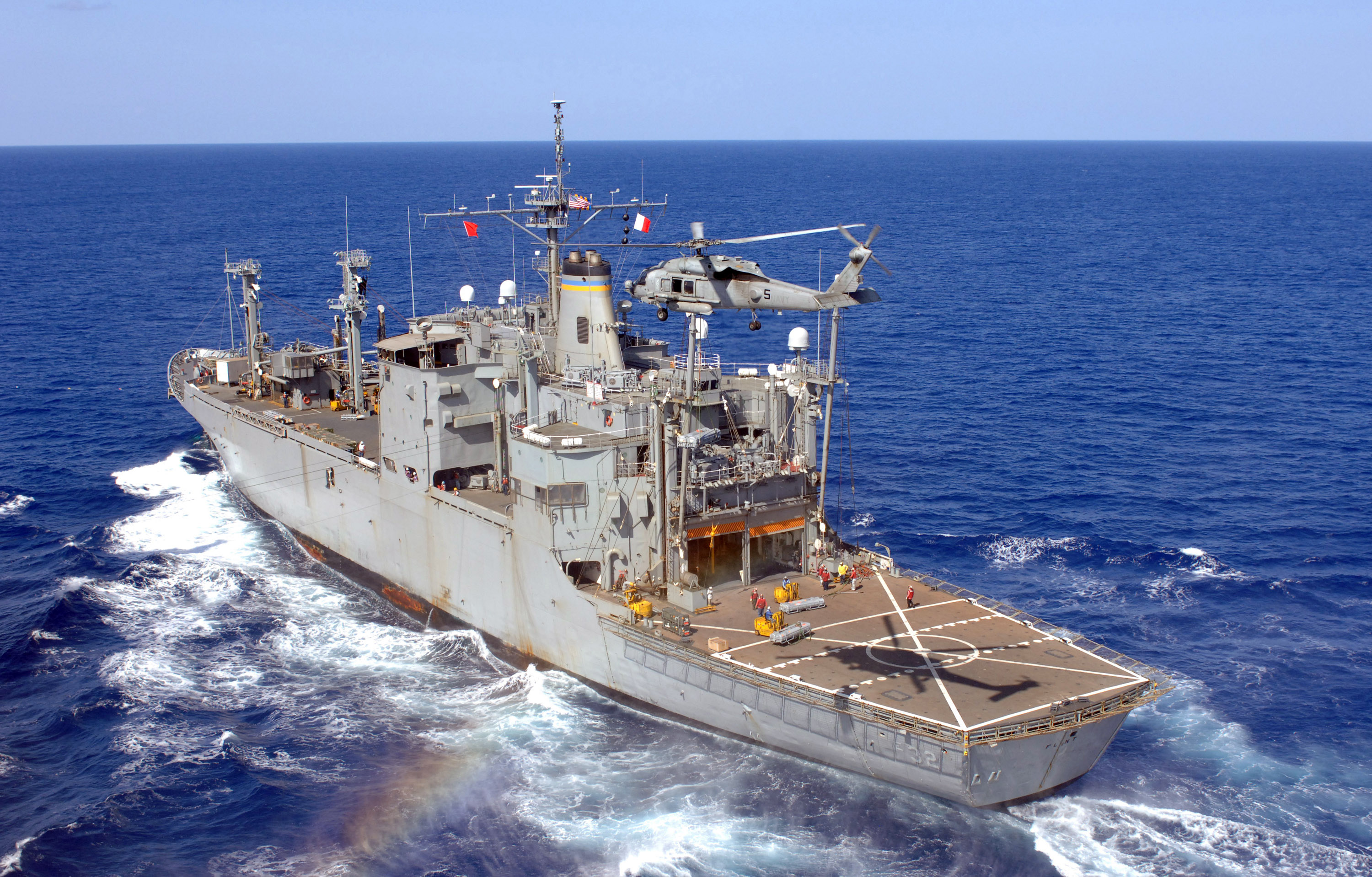
USNS Flint (T-AE-32) in 2007, while deployed as part of the USS Ronald Reagan Carrier Group.

Flint was decommissioned at Naval Air Station Alameda, California, on 4 August 1995 after more than 23 years of service. The ship was transferred to the Military Sealift Command, at which time it became known as the USNS Flint (T-AE-32).

Under the Military Sealift Command, Flint operated with a smaller civilian crew operating the ship's major systems and a smaller Navy detachment responsible for communications and operational coordination. As an MSC asset, Flint participated in additional deployments to the Western Pacific and Persian Gulf.
