= USNS Kiska =

Ammunition ship of the United States Navy

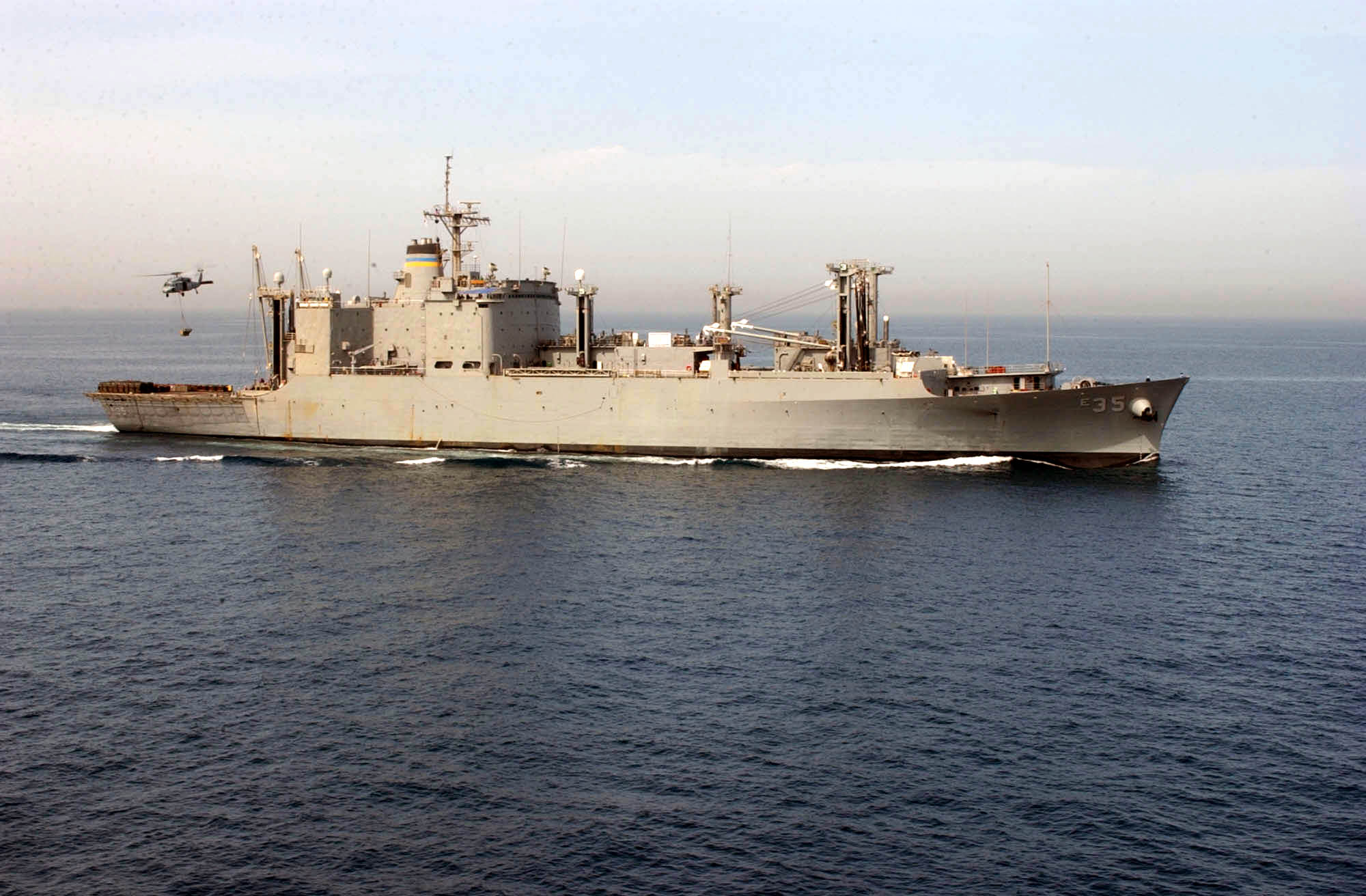
- USNS Kiska in the Persian Gulf, 2003

History

United States
- Name: Kiska
- Namesake: Kiska, a volcanic island in Alaska
- Awarded: March 8, 1968
- Builder: Ingalls Shipbuilding
- Laid down: April 8, 1971
- Launched: March 11, 1972
- Commissioned: December 16, 1972
- Decommissioned: August 1, 1996
- In service: August 1, 1996
- Stricken: January 15, 2011
- Home port: Port Chicago, Vallejo, CA
- Identification: MMSI number: 367275000; Callsign: NMFC
- Fate: Scrapped November 20, 2013

General characteristics
- Class & type: Kilauea-class ammunition ship
- Displacement: 19,940 long tons (20,260 t)
- Length: 564 ft (172 m)
- Beam: 81 ft (25 m)
- Draft: 28 ft (8.5 m)
- Propulsion: 3 Foster-Wheeler boilers; 600 psi (4,100 kPa); 870 °F (466 °C); 1 turbine, 22,000 hp (16,000 kW); Automated Propulsion System (APS)
- Speed: 20 knots (37 km/h; 23 mph)
- Complement: 125 civilians, 55 naval personnel
- Aircraft carried: 2 × CH-46 helicopters

USNS Kiska (T-AE-35), ex-USS Kiska (AE-35) was one of five ammunition ships operated by Military Sealift Command of the Naval Fleet Auxiliary Force. The ship was laid down on 8 April 1971 at Ingalls Shipbuilding, Pascagoula, Mississippi as USS Kiska (AE-35) and was launched on 11 March 1972. Originally commissioned on December 16, 1972 in Charleston South Carolina. The Kiska then travelled through the Panama canal to its first home port in Mare Island California. She was decommissioned on 1 August 1996, and that same day entered service with Military Sealift Command as USNS Kiska (T-AE-35). She continued to operate under Military Sealift Command's control until she was deactivated at Pearl Harbor, Hawaii, on January 15, 2011. Kiska was the eighth and final ship of the Kilauea-class ammunition ships. Kiska was disposed of by Navy title transfer to the Maritime Administration as of May 30, 2013. Kiska was completely dismantled to its material content by Esco Marine, Inc. in Brownsville, Texas on November 20, 2013.
