= Replenish =

Replenish may refer to:

- Replenish (album), a 1995 album by English alternative-rock band Reef
- Repent Replenish Repeat, an album by Dan le Sac Vs Scroobius Pip, released in 2013
- Samsung Replenish, an Android 2.3 smartphone

== See also ==
- Replenishment (disambiguation)
