= USNS Kilauea =

Ammunition ship of the United States Navy

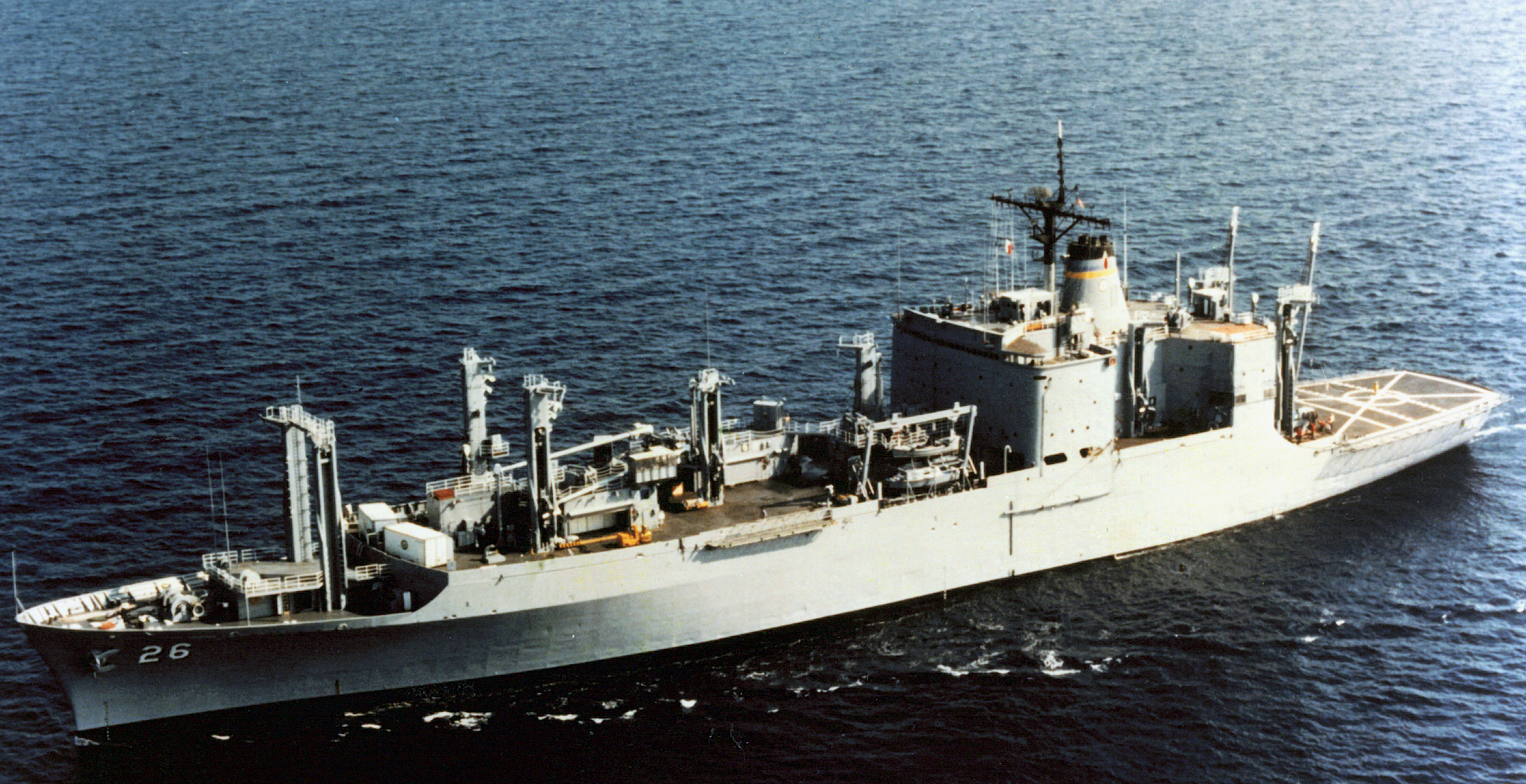
- USNS Kilauea (T-AE-26)

History

United States
- Name: USNS Kilauea (AE-26)
- Namesake: Kilauea
- Owner: United States Navy
- Operator: Military Sealift Command
- Awarded: 30 March 1965
- Builder: General Dynamics Quincy Shipbuilding Division
- Laid down: 10 March 1966
- Launched: 9 August 1967
- Sponsored by: Mrs. Michael J. Kirwan
- Acquired: 12 June 1968
- Commissioned: 10 August 1968
- Decommissioned: 1 October 1980
- In service: 1 October 1980
- Stricken: 15 September 2008
- Identification: IMO number: 8834079
- Fate: Expended as a target 24 July 2012

General characteristics
- Class & type: Kilauea-class ammunition ship
- Displacement: 11,915 tons (light) 20,169 tons (full)
- Length: 561 ft (171 m)
- Beam: 81 ft (25 m)
- Draft: 31 ft (9.4 m)
- Speed: 20 knots (37 km/h; 23 mph)
- Complement: 403
- Armament: Originally 4 x 2 3-inch/50 DP guns, later: 2 x 2 3-inch/50 DP guns and 2 x 1 CIWS Phalanx mounts

USNS Kilauea (AE-26) was the lead ship of her class of ammunition ships of the United States Navy. She was named for Kilauea, the Hawaiian volcano.

Kilauea was laid down 10 March 1966 by General Dynamics Quincy Shipbuilding Division, Quincy, Massachusetts; launched 9 August 1967; sponsored by Mrs. Michael J. Kirwan, wife of Representative Michael J. Kirwan of Ohio. Kilauea was commissioned 10 August 1968 with Captain William L. McGonagle, USN commanding.

Kilauea was decommissioned and placed in service with the Military Sealift Command (MSC) as USNS Kilauea (T-AE-26) on 1 October 1980.

Kilauea was deployed to the Persian Gulf on August 23, 1990 as part of International Naval task force for Operation Desert Shield from 2 September 1990 to 20 January 1991 when she was assigned to the 3rd Marine Amphibious Group, The USS Theodore Roosevelt and USS Midway battlegroups for Operation Desert Storm from 20 January 1991 to April 17, 1991.

Kilauea was deployed to East Timor as part of the Australian-led INTERFET peacekeeping task force from 20 September to 2 October 1999.

Kilauea was struck from the Naval Vessel Register in September 2008.

Kilauea was scheduled to be expended as a target vessel as part of the 2012 RIMPAC exercise. It was sunk by a Mark 48 torpedo fired from the Australian submarine HMAS Farncomb on 24 July 2012.
