= Glenn Parry =

British professor

- Born: Glenn Parry
- Occupation: Professor

Glenn Parry is a professor in Digital Transformation at University of Surrey and is the Associate Dean of Research for the Faculty of Arts, Business and Social Sciences. He was formally Professor of strategy and operations management at Bristol Business School, UWE. and senior visiting fellow with the University of Bath, UK. He authored and edited the textbook titled Service Design and Delivery published by Springer.

== Personal life ==
=== Education ===
He received B.Sc and M.Phil degrees from University of Wales, Swansea in 1995 and 1997. In 2003, he obtained Certificate in Counselling and Psychotherapy from Coventry University, and Certificate in Teaching Higher Education and Diploma in Rogerian Counselling and Psychotherapy from University of Warwick in 2005. He completed his PhD from University of Cambridge in 2000.

=== Career ===
Professor Parry led Surrey Business School REF 2021 Impact work, supporting the submission of 5 impact cases. The school improved from 91st REF2014 to 16th in REF2021. He was subsequently Head of Department of Digital Economy, Entrepreneurship and Innovation, growing the department in size to be one of the three core disciplines of the School. He is currently the Associate Dean Research and Innovation in the Faculty of Arts and Social Sciences, leading research management for a diverse portfolio of disciplines including Business, Economics, Law, Acting, Music, Sociology, Hospitality and languages.

Parry was a leader of the 9 million Euro European Integrated Logistics for Innovative Product Technologies project (ILIPT). The project's main purpose is research and production descriptions of how a build to order system may be implemented for European vehicle manufacture. The key findings were presented to the European Commission and industry and were detailed in a book "Build to Order" In the project German OEMs were also involved, the project has garnered international interest.

Parry's worked on Blockchain research as CoDirector of the UK Centre for Decentralised Digital Economy. He spoke on the Oxford Union Society webinar series on Blockchain and Supply Chains. His work capturing the learning from the Reducing Friction in International Trade (RFIT) blockchain system forms part of the UK Government 2025 Border Strategy.· He has worked closely with Cabinet Office and HMRC on the development of pilot systems for border trade management. He is coAuthor of ICC & IC4DTI “Joint Consultation Response - Realising the UK’s Digital Trade Opportunity for Growth, Resilience and SME Empowerment” May 2025 and contributor to the Tony Blair Institute for Global Change "Making Trade Work Again" report May 2025.

In the creative sector, Parry was part of Bristol and Bath by Design, examining design companies in the Bristol and Bath region, to better understand the economic and cultural value of the design-led sector. The work led to the book Migration, Mobility and the Creative that found a nexus between migration and occupation patterns of creative workers and early family experiences and social class. The work challenges Florida's thesis that creative workers have unique characteristics and create vibrant cities. The work recommends that for success, policy redirect its focus towards creating places with good schools, affordable housing, sustainable jobs and strong connections across communities.

== Publications ==
- The Threat to Core Competence Posed by Developing Closer Supply Chain Relationships, International Journal of Logistics: Research and its Applications. 2006
- Requirement for a Sea-change in Car Production in New Technologies for the Intelligent Design and Operation of Manufacturing Networks, (eds) Fraunhofer IRB Verlag. 2007
- Outsourcing engineering commodity procurement, Supply Chain Management. 2008
- Lean New Product Introduction: a UK in Lean Product Development - Concept & Models, (eds) Icfai www.books.iupindia.org. 2008
- The importance of knowledge management for ERP systems, International Journal of Logistics Research and Applications Volume 11 Issue 6. 2008
- Build To Order: The Road to the 5-day Car, Springer. 2008
- Lean Competence: integration of theories in operations management practice, Supply Chain Management Volume 15 Issue 3. 2010
- Strategic outsourcing of core competences in the automotive industry: threat or opportunity?, International Journal of Automotive Technology and Management 9 (1). 2009
