= USS Mount Hood (AE-29) =

Ammunition ship of the United States Navy

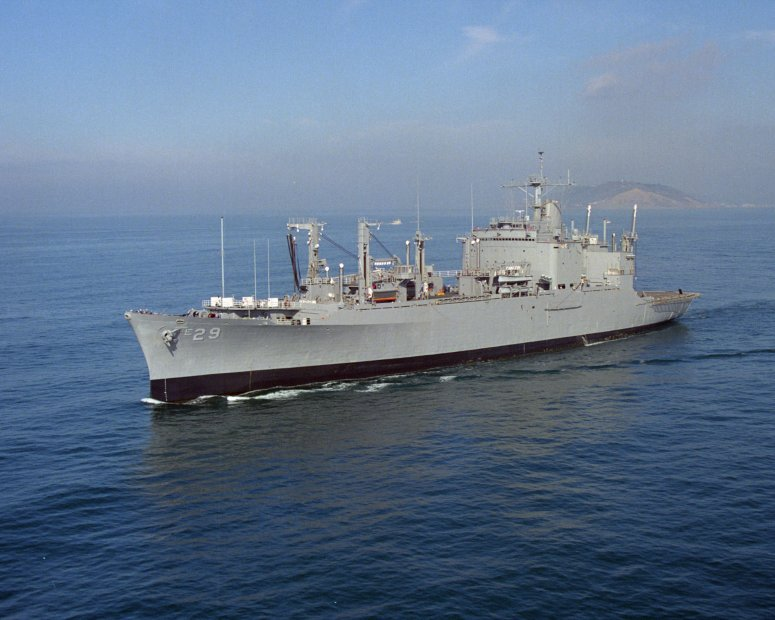
- Mount Hood heading out of San Diego Bay on 30 September 1997

History

United States
- Name: Mount Hood (AE-29)
- Namesake: Mount Hood
- Awarded: 28 January 1966
- Builder: Bethlehem Steel Corporation
- Laid down: 8 May 1967
- Launched: 17 July 1968
- Sponsored by: Mrs. Robert A. Frosch
- Commissioned: 1 May 1971
- Decommissioned: 10 August 1999
- Stricken: 10 August 1999
- Motto: Arma Pro Armada
- Nickname(s): "The Good Hood"
- Fate: Scrapped

General characteristics
- Class & type: Kilauea-class ammunition ship
- Displacement: Light: 10,312 tons; Full load: 18,664 tons
- Length: 564 ft (172 m)
- Beam: 81 ft (25 m)
- Draft: 27 ft (8.2 m)
- Propulsion: 3 Foster-Wheeler boilers; 600 psi; 870 °F; 1 turbine, 22,000 hp; Automated Propulsion System (APS); One six-bladed propeller
- Speed: 20 knots (37 km/h)
- Complement: 28 officers; 390 enlisted
- Armament: .50-caliber, 25 mm Chain Gun
- Aircraft carried: 2 CH-46 Sea Knight helicopters

USS Mount Hood (AE-29) was a Kilauea-class ammunition ship in the United States Navy. She was the second Navy munitions ship to be named after Mount Hood, a volcano in the Cascade Range in Oregon.

Mount Hood was laid down 8 May 1967 by Bethlehem Steel Corporation, Sparrows Point, Maryland; launched 17 July 1968; sponsored by Mrs. Robert A. Frosch, wife of the Assistant Secretary of the Navy for Research and Development; and commissioned on 1 May 1971. She was homeported in Concord, California.

Unlike her seven sister ships of the Kilauea class, she was never transferred to the Military Sealift Command. She was decommissioned in August 1999 and held in reserve at Bremerton, Washington, before being moved in October 1999 to Suisun Bay, California.

She was sold for scrapping on 21 August 2013 and placed under tow 5 September 2013 to Brownsville, Texas, to be dismantled.
