= Kilauea-class ammunition ship =

U.S. Navy cargo vessel class

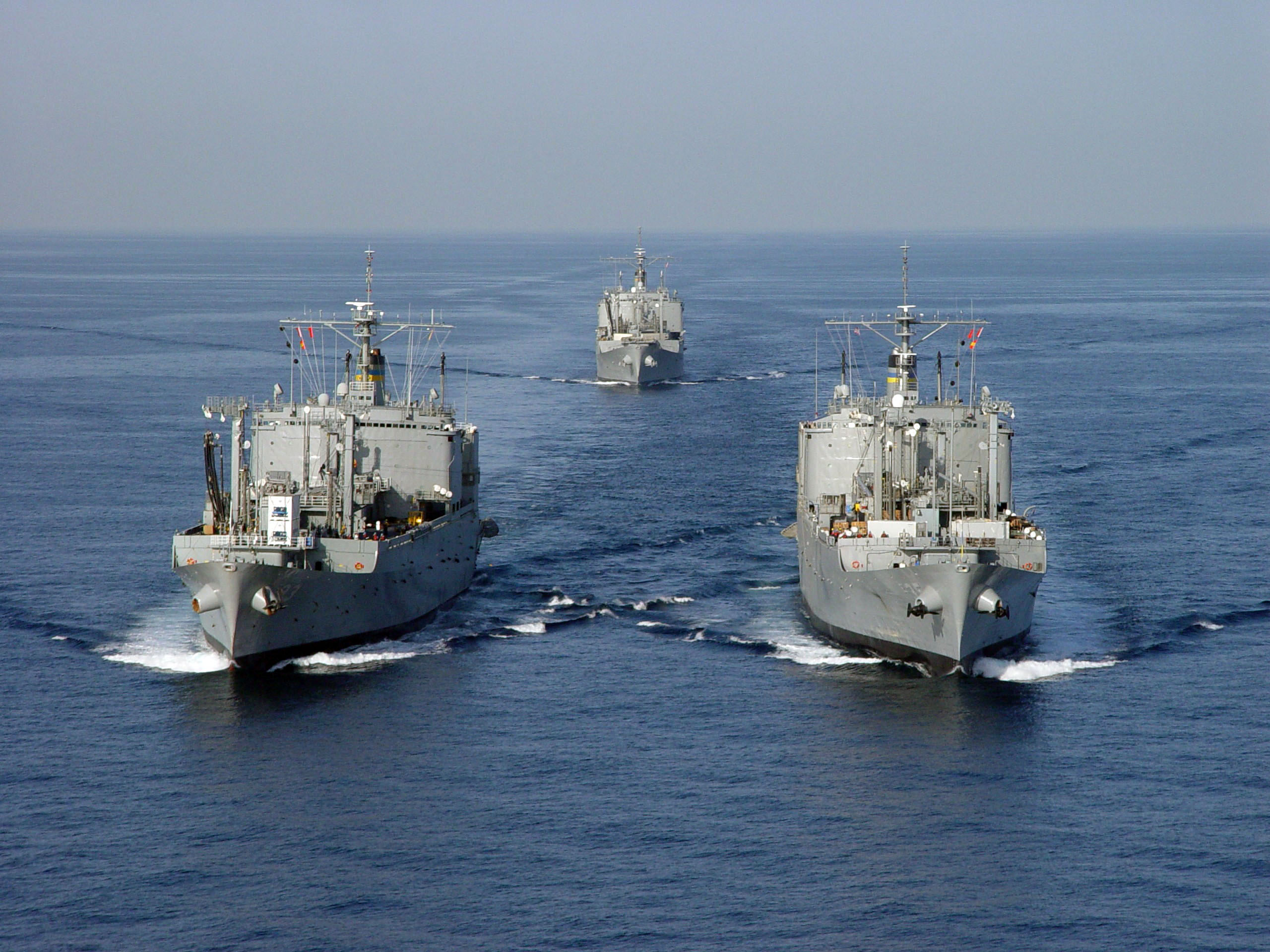
- Three of the eight Kilauea-class ships steaming together: Shasta (left), Kiska (right), Flint (rear) (2005)

Class overview
- Builders: General Dynamics, Bethlehem Steel, Ingalls Shipbuilding
- Operators: US Navy and Military Sealift Command
- Preceded by: Nitro-class ammunition ship
- Succeeded by: Lewis and Clark-class dry cargo ship
- Built: 1966–1972
- In commission: 1967–1996
- Completed: 8
- Active: 0
- Scrapped: 6

General characteristics
- Type: ammunition carrier
- Displacement: 13,688 tons, 20,500 f/l
- Length: 564 feet (172 m)
- Beam: 81 feet (25 m)
- Draft: 29 feet (8.8 m)
- Propulsion: one GE steam turbine, 22,000 shp; three Foster-Wheeler boilers; single propeller.
- Speed: 20 knots (37 km/h; 23 mph)
- Complement: 411 (USN)/130 (MSC)
- Sensors & processing systems: Mark 56 fire-control system
- Armament: originally four twin 3"/50 caliber gun mounts
- Aircraft carried: two helicopters (UH-46 or MH-60)

The Kilauea class ammunition ship was a class of eight United States Navy cargo vessels designed for underway replenishment of naval warships. The ships were constructed 1968–1972 and were initially commissioned naval ships, carrying a crew of naval personnel. At various dates 1980–96 these ships were decommissioned and transferred to the Military Sealift Command for civilian operation. They were eventually all replaced by the Lewis and Clark-class dry cargo ships. The lead ship of the class, Kilauea, was commissioned on 10 August 1968, and the last, the Kiska, on 16 December 1972.

Ships
Ship	Hull No.	Builder	Commissioned	Transferred to MSC	Status	NVR link
Kilauea	AE-26	General Dynamics, Quincy	1968-08-10	1980-10-01	Stricken, sunk as an exercise target 2012	
Butte	AE-27	General Dynamics, Quincy	1968-12-14	1996-06-03	Stricken, sunk as an exercise target 2006	
Santa Barbara	AE-28	Bethlehem Sparrows Point Shipyard	1970-07-11	1998-09-30	Stricken, scrapped	
Mount Hood	AE-29	Bethlehem Sparrows Point Shipyard	1971-05-01		Stricken, scrapped	
Flint	AE-32	Ingalls Shipbuilding, Pascagoula	1971-11-20	1995-08-04	Sold for scrap 24 November 2015	
Shasta	AE-33	Ingalls Shipbuilding, Pascagoula	1972-02-26	1997-10-01	Stricken, scrapped commencing in November 2013	
Mount Baker	AE-34	Ingalls Shipbuilding, Pascagoula	1972-07-22	1996-12-18	Stricken, scrapped	
Kiska	AE-35	Ingalls Shipbuilding, Pascagoula	1972-12-16	1996-08-01	Stricken, to be disposed of by dismantling	
