= William McGonagle =

United States Navy Medal of Honor recipient

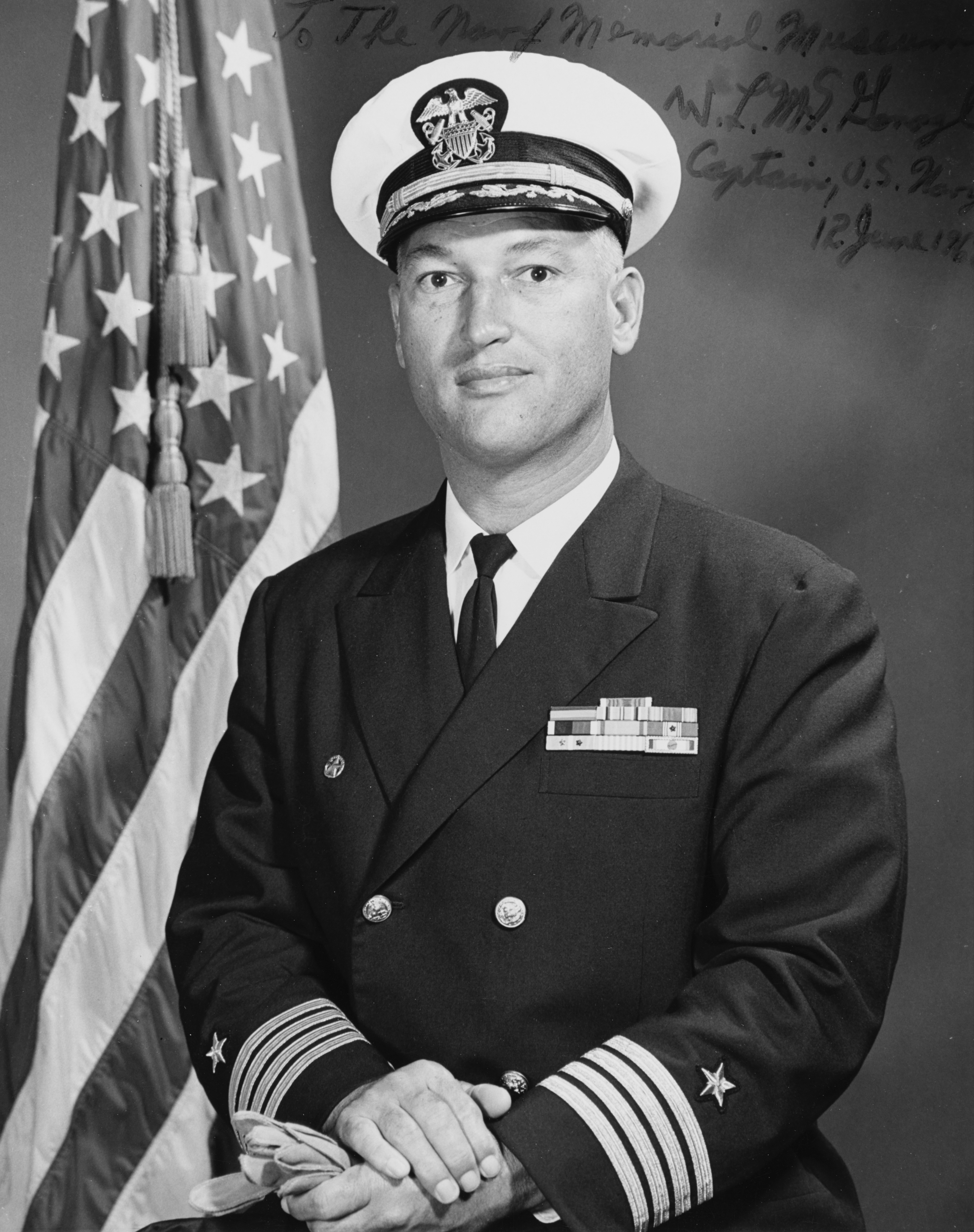
- Captain William McGonagle, October 1967
- Born: November 19, 1925; Wichita, Kansas, US
- Died: March 3, 1999 (aged 73); Palm Springs, California, US
- Burial place: Arlington National Cemetery
- Military career
- Allegiance: United States
- Branch: United States Navy
- Service years: 1944–1974
- Rank: Captain
- Commands: USS Kilauea; USS Liberty; USS Reclaimer; USS Mataco
- Conflicts: World War II; Korean War; Six-Day War; Vietnam War
- Awards: Medal of Honor; Meritorious Service Medal (2); Purple Heart

William Loren McGonagle (November 19, 1925 – March 3, 1999) was a United States Navy officer who received the Medal of Honor for his actions while in command of the USS Liberty when it was attacked by Israel in the Eastern Mediterranean on June 8, 1967, during the Six-Day War.

After accepting a commission in the United States Navy in 1944, McGonagle held various assignments before taking command of the Liberty in 1966. In June 1967 the Liberty was sailing in international waters in the Eastern Mediterranean when it was attacked by the Israel Defense Forces, injuring McGonagle, killing and injuring other members of his crew, and severely damaging the ship. He maintained control of the ship until help arrived, and after healing from his wounds was awarded the Medal of Honor for his actions on the Liberty in 1967. He continued his navy career, holding several more positions until retiring in 1974. When he died in 1999 he was buried at Arlington National Cemetery with full military honors a short distance from the graves of some of his crew who were killed during the attack.

== Naval career ==
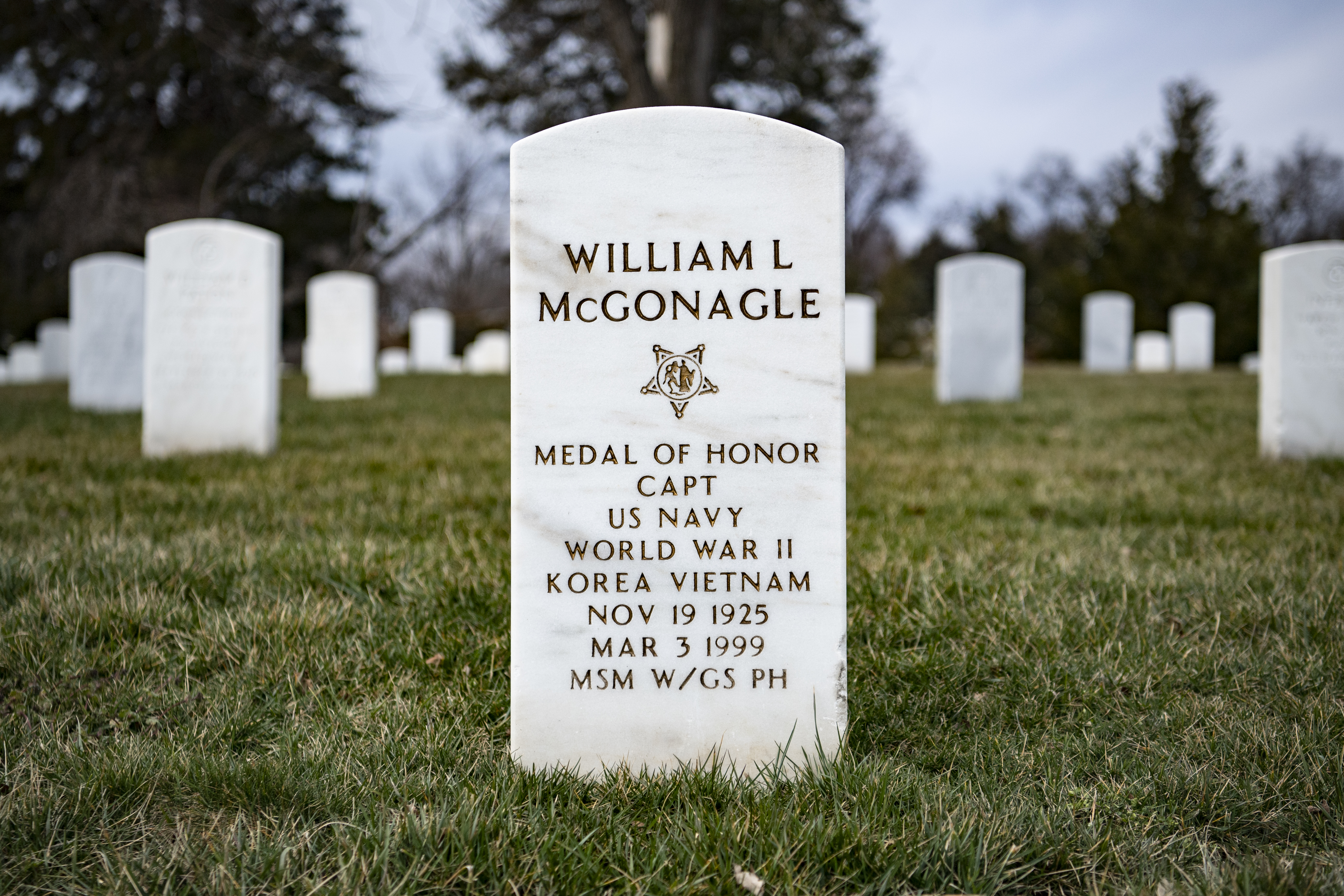
Grave at Arlington National Cemetery

McGonagle was born November 19, 1925, in Wichita, Kansas. After attending secondary school, McGonagle attended the University of Southern California in which he participated in the Naval Reserve Officer Training Corps Program. In June 1947, he accepted a commission in the navy as an ensign. He was assigned to the destroyer USS Frank Knox and after that was posted to the minesweeper USS Partridge from 1947–1950. During the Korean War he served on the minesweeper USS Kite during the extensive operations that earned him and the other members of the crew a Presidential Unit Citation. From 1951 to 1966, he was assigned to various positions ashore and afloat, including commands of the fleet tug USS Mataco from 1957 to 1958 and the salvage ship USS Reclaimer from 1961 to 1963.

McGonagle took command of the USS Liberty in April 1966. On June 8, 1967, during the Six-Day War between Israel and her Arab neighbors, the Liberty was attacked by Israeli forces while sailing in international waters in the Eastern Mediterranean. The Israeli government has maintained since the assault that they believed that the ship was an Egyptian vessel. Israel relentlessly attacked the Liberty with jets, helicopters, and motor torpedo boats. McGonagle was severely wounded during the first air attack and although the bridge had sustained heavy damage he stayed and directed the defense of the ship, refusing to leave his post for medical attention. As the Israeli fighters continued their attack he maneuvered his ship, directed its defense, supervised the control of flooding and fire, and saw to the care of the casualties. Captain McGonagle remained at his battle station and continued to command his ship for more than 17 hours. It was only after rendezvous with a United States destroyer that he relinquished personal control of the Liberty and permitted himself to be removed from the bridge. The combined air and sea attack killed 34 crew members including naval officers, seamen, two Marines, and a civilian, wounded 171, and severely damaged the ship. Although the ship had a 39 ft (12 m) wide by 24 ft (7.3 m) high hole and a twisted keel from a torpedo impact, the crew kept the ship afloat, and were able to leave the area under their own power. When the damage to the ship was assessed 821 rocket, shell, and machine-gun holes were found in the ship's hull.

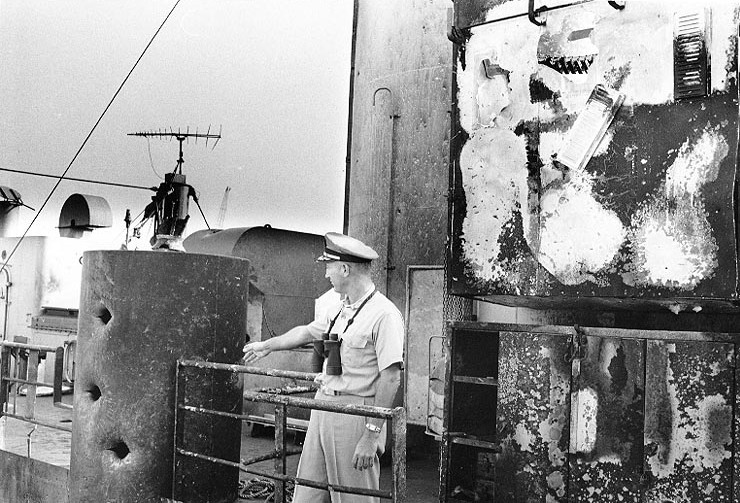
Commander McGonagle points out damage to the USS Liberty.

The Medal of Honor was presented to him, in secret, at the Washington Navy Yard by the Secretary of the Navy, rather than at the White House by the President. This represents the only time a Medal of Honor recipient was awarded in such a manner. After being promoted to captain in October 1967 and recovering from his wounds he was given command of the new ammunition ship USS Kilauea. He then served as commanding officer of the Naval Reserve Officer Training Corps Unit at the University of Oklahoma before retiring from active duty in 1974.

== Death and legacy ==
For several decades following the USS Liberty incident, he refused to publicly comment on the attack. He made occasional appearances with his surviving crew, such as on the 24th anniversary of the attack (in 1991) in a reunion at the White House. During his later years, including during the White House reunion, he suffered from cancer. On the 30th anniversary of the attack (in 1997), during a reunion held at Arlington National Cemetery, he finally called for an investigation and denounced Israel’s mistaken identity claim: “I think it’s about time that the state of Israel and the United States government provide the crew members of the Liberty and the rest of the American people the facts of what happened, and why…the Liberty was attacked 30 years ago today. For many years I have wanted to believe that the attack on the Liberty was pure error. It appears to me that it was not a pure case of mistaken identity. It was, on the other hand, gross incompetence and aggravated dereliction of duty on the part of many officers and men of the state of Israel.”

On March 3, 1999, he died in Palm Springs, California, and, following services at the Post Chapel at Fort Myer, Virginia, he was buried with full military honors on April 9, 1999, at Arlington National Cemetery with members of his USS Liberty crew in attendance. His grave can be found in section 34, lot 208 near the common gravesite of six other members of the USS Liberty crew.

== Awards and honors ==

Medal of Honor	Meritorious Service Medal with one star	
Purple Heart	Combat Action Ribbon with one star	Presidential Unit Citation with one star
American Campaign Medal	World War II Victory Medal	China Service Medal
Navy Occupation Service Medal with ASIA Clasp	National Defense Service Medal with one star	Korean Service Medal with six stars
Armed Forces Expeditionary Medal	Vietnam Service Medal with one star	Presidential Unit Citation (Korea)
United Nations Korea Medal	Vietnam Campaign Medal	Korean War Service Medal
Command at Sea insignia

=== Medal of Honor citation ===
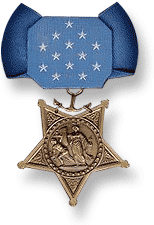

The President of the United States of America, authorized by an Act of Congress, June 11, 1968, has awarded, in the name of Congress, the Medal of Honor to

CAPTAIN WILLIAM LOREN MCGONAGLE
UNITED STATES NAVY

For conspicuous gallantry and intrepidity at the risk of his life above and beyond the call of duty as Commanding Officer, USS Liberty (AGTR-5) in the Eastern Mediterranean on 8–9 June 1967. Sailing in international waters, the Liberty was attacked without warning by jet fighter aircraft and motor torpedo boats which inflicted many casualties among the crew and caused extreme damage to the ship. Although severely wounded during the first air attack, Captain (then Commander) McGonagle remained at his battle station on the badly damaged bridge and, with full knowledge of the seriousness of his wounds, subordinated his own welfare to the safety and survival of his command. Steadfastly refusing any treatment which would take him away from his post, he calmly continued to exercise firm command of his ship. Despite continuous exposure to fire, he maneuvered his ship, directed its defense, supervised the control of flooding and fire, and saw to the care of the casualties. Captain McGonagle's extraordinary valor under these conditions inspired the surviving members of the Liberty's crew, many of them seriously wounded, to heroic efforts to overcome the battle damage and keep the ship afloat. Subsequent to the attack, although in great pain and weak from the loss of blood, Captain McGonagle remained at his battle station and continued to command his ship for more than seventeen hours. It was only after rendezvous with a United States destroyer that he relinquished personal control of the Liberty and permitted himself to be removed from the bridge. Even then, he refused much needed medical attention until convinced that the seriously wounded among his crew had been treated. Captain McGonagle's superb professionalism, courageous fighting spirit, and valiant leadership saved his ship and many lives. His actions sustain and enhance the finest traditions of the United States Naval Service.

Captain McGonagle’s Medal of Honor citation does not list the nationality of the military forces which attacked his ship. This omission is highly unusual and was allegedly due to a supposed cover-up by the incumbent presidential administration, although this remains highly contentious.

=== Other honors ===
A Golden Palm Star on the Palm Springs Walk of Stars was dedicated to McGonagle for Veterans Day in 1999, recognizing him as one of five Medal of Honor recipients from the Southern California desert area.

The Captain William L. McGonagle Branch Medical/Dental Clinic was dedicated at Naval Security Group Activity Northwest, Chesapeake VA, on December 5, 1997. This is believed to be one of the few times in history a U.S. Naval building has been dedicated in honor of a living sailor.

== See also ==
- List of Medal of Honor recipients

== External links and further reading ==
- "William McGonagle". Hall of Valor. Military Times.
- Eric Page (March 9, 1999). "William McGonagle, 73, Hero of Israel Attack on the Liberty". The New York Times.
- John Crewdson (October 2, 2007). "New revelations in attack on American spy ship". The Chicago Tribune.
- "USS Liberty Memorial".
- "USS Liberty (AGTR-5), 1964–1970". Naval Historical Center. January 14, 2001. Archived from the original on February 11, 2001.
- "USS Liberty (AGTR-5) – Attack by Israeli forces, 8 June 1967". Naval Historical Center. January 14, 2001.
- "Dead in the Water". BBC Four Documentaries]. August 21, 2004.
- Jon Thurber (March 11, 1999). "Capt. William McGonagle; Won Medal of Honor After Israelis Attacked Ship". Obituaries. Los Angeles Times.
- Cristol, A. Jay (2002). The Liberty Incident: The 1967 Israeli Attack on the U.S. Navy Spy Ship. Dulles, Virginia: Brassey's. ISBN 1-57488-414-X.
