= Replenishment =

Replenishment may refer to:

== Processes and projects ==
- Beach replenishment or Beach nourishment, a coastal-management process that artificially replaces sediments lost to erosion
- Collaborative planning, forecasting, and replenishment, an inventory-management scheme trademarked by the Voluntary Interindustry Commerce Standards Association
- Lake Chad replenishment project, a proposed major water-diversion scheme to channel water from the Ubangi River to Lake Chad
- Replenishment (photography), a process used in processing photographic paper and film

== Ships ==
- Replenishment oiler, a naval auxiliary ship that can conduct underway replenishment on the high seas
- Underway replenishment, a method of transferring fuel, munitions, and stores from one ship to another while under way
- Vertical replenishment, a method of supplying seaborne vessels by helicopter

== See also ==
- Replenish (disambiguation)
