= Backlog =

Backlog may refer to:

== Science, technology and business ==
- Product backlog, a list of requirements for a software product in development; see Scrum (software development) § Sprint backlog
- Backlog (academic journals), the phenomenon of a number of accepted papers waiting a significant time to be published
- Backlog of unexamined patent applications, all patent applications that have been filed and still remain to be examined
- An argument to Berkeley sockets "listen" function representing the number of pending connections
- Customer lead time in sales and operations planning

== Music ==
- Backlog (album), a compilation by Leftfield and Djum Djum
- Backlog 1987–1991 (1995), an album by Show of Hands
- Backlog 2 (2011), an album by Show of Hands

== See also ==
- Tardiness (scheduling), a measure of a delay in executing certain operations
