= USS Santa Barbara (AE-28) =

Ammunition ship of the United States Navy

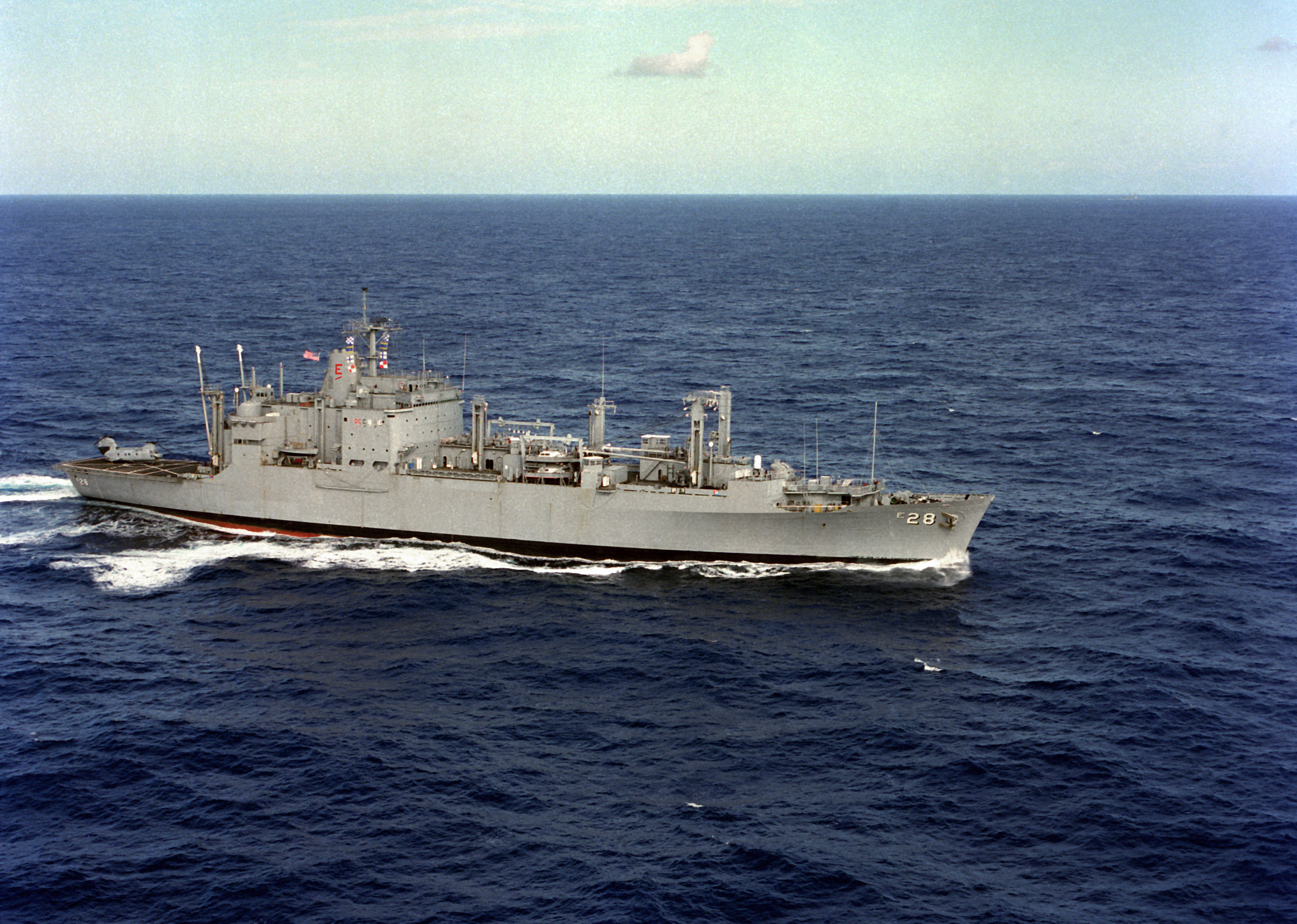
- Santa Barbara in 1992

History

United States
- Name: Santa Barbara
- Namesake: Santa Barbara, California
- Awarded: 26 January 1966
- Builder: Bethlehem Sparrows Point Shipyard
- Laid down: 20 December 1966
- Launched: 23 January 1968
- Sponsored by: Mrs. Graeme C. Bannerman
- Commissioned: 11 July 1970
- Decommissioned: 30 September 1998
- In service: Transferred to Military Sealift Command, 30 September 1998
- Stricken: 3 August 2005
- Motto: Nos Numerus Unus; ("We are number one")
- Fate: Sold for scrap 2007

General characteristics
- Class & type: Kilauea-class ammunition ship
- Displacement: 10,417 long tons (10,584 t) light; 18,088 long tons (18,378 t) full loaded
- Length: 564 ft (172 m)
- Beam: 81 ft (25 m)
- Draft: 27 ft 7 in (8.41 m)
- Speed: 20 knots (37 km/h; 23 mph)

USS Santa Barbara (AE-28) was an Kilauea-class ammunition ship in the United States Navy. Santa Barbara is both the name of Santa Barbara, California and a historically active volcano on Terceira Island in the Azores. In addition, Saint Barbara is the patron saint of those who work with cannons and explosives.

Santa Barbara was laid down on 30 December 1966 at the Bethlehem Sparrows Point Shipyard in Sparrows Point, Maryland; launched on 23 January 1968; sponsored by Mrs. Graeme C. Bannerman, the wife of the Assistant Secretary of the Navy for Installations and Logistics; and commissioned on 11 July 1970.

== Service history ==
Following fitting out at the Norfolk Naval Shipyard, Santa Barbara arrived at her selected home port, Davisville, Rhode Island, on 18 September 1970. On 6 October, the ammunition ship conducted her first underway replenishment.

Santa Barbara departed from Davisville on 15 October for the Caribbean and six weeks of shakedown training at Guantánamo Bay, Cuba. Her shakedown completed on 25 November, the Santa Barbara returned to her home port of Davisville on 5 December.

Underway again on 11 January 1971, Santa Barbara arrived at the Naval Ammunition Depot, Earle, New Jersey, for her first regular loadout, which was completed four days later at the Naval Weapons Station, Yorktown, Virginia

After a short period in Davisville, Santa Barbara got underway on 1 February for her first regularly scheduled fleet exercises. With units of Task Force 27 participating in Operation Springboard, the ammunition ship operated out of Roosevelt Roads, Puerto Rico, until 25 February, rearming 17 ships and successfully transferring over 400 tons of missiles, bombs, and projectiles. On 15 March, the Santa Barbara began a two-month availability at the Boston Naval Shipyard. Departing on 25 June, she arrived the next day at Davisville.

In July, she sailed to Guantánamo Bay, Cuba, for refresher training, and next returned to Davisville in August. In September, Santa Barbara was deployed to the Mediterranean Sea, returning to the United States on 17 March 1972. She departed from the New England coast in April, bound for a short cruise in the Caribbean. Returning to Rhode Island in late May, she departed again on 5 June; this time ordered to the western Pacific on an extended deployment. After seven months in Asian waters, Santa Barbara entered Pearl Harbor, Hawaii, on 5 February 1973. Next, she proceeded to Quonset Point, Rhode Island, via the Panama Canal, arriving on the 22nd. She operated along the East Coast and in the Caribbean for the remainder of 1973 and for three months into 1974. In April 1974, Santa Barbara embarked upon another Mediterranean Sea mission.

Originally home-ported in Davisville, Rhode Island, her home port was moved to Charleston, South Carolina, one of America's oldest and most historic cities, for a period of time before the Charleston Naval Base was closed.

Decommissioned on 30 September 1998, Santa Barbara was transferred to the Military Sealift Command (MSC), Naval Fleet Auxiliary Force the same day and her hull number was changed to T-AE-28. She remained in service with MSC until she was finally retired on 5 August 2005. She was sold for scrap in 2007.

== Awards ==
Santa Barbara's awards include Battle Efficiency "E" Awards won in 1979, 1980, 1989, and 1993 for exceptional performance from all departments. She was awarded the Meritorious Unit Commendation in 1973 for numerous records set replenishing at sea during the Vietnam War, and again in 1988 for her performance during her March 1988 Mediterranean Sea deployment. In 1989, she earned the Golden Anchor Award for the best sailor retention in her class of ships, and she was the parent ship for the 1989 Surface Forces Atlantic Sailor of the Year. In the 1991 and 1994 deployments she earned South West Asia Service Medal, crossing into the Indian Ocean and Red Sea in support of the 5th Fleet. Her latest awards are the Maritime Warfare Excellence Award, the Engineering/Survivability Excellence Award, the Command and Control Excellence Award, the Logistics Management Excellence Award, and the Meritorious Unit Commendation for her performance during her 1992-1994 Mediterranean deployment. The ship also earned one campaign star for Vietnam War service.
