= Backlog (academic journals) =

In academic publishing, the word backlog usually refers to the phenomenon that a journal has a number of accepted papers waiting to be published for a significant time.

== Usage of the term ==
The backlog is usually described in months; for instance, a certain journal could have a backlog of 12 months, which means that on average it takes one year for the journal to publish a paper that has been accepted. This waiting time adds on top of the time between initial submission and acceptance of a paper, which can also vary.

Some journals have a backlog of more than a year, which is usually caused by the journal's editors' decision to accept more or longer papers than the journal publishes in a certain time interval.

The American Mathematical Society publishes a list of the backlog of mathematical journals each year in the November issue of the Notices.

If a journal has a heavy backlog, this might have the effect that the journal is less likely to accept papers in the future, or even reject all manuscript submissions temporarily.
