= Build to stock =

Build-ahead production approach

Build to stock (BTS), or make to stock (MTS) is a build-ahead production approach in which production plans may be based upon sales forecasts and/or historical demand. BTS is usually associated with the industrial revolution mass production techniques, where in anticipation of demand vast quantities of goods are produced and stocked in warehouses.

== Overview ==
Build to stock is frequently considered as an appropriate solution for products where there are few product lines and long changeover times between costly products.

Some firms build all their products to order while others build them to stock. Given the widespread proliferation of products, there are a number of manufacturers taking a hybrid approach, where some items are built to stock and others are built to order.

Build to stock has been replaced in many industries by build to order, where items are produced to specific sales orders.
