= Build to order =

Production approach

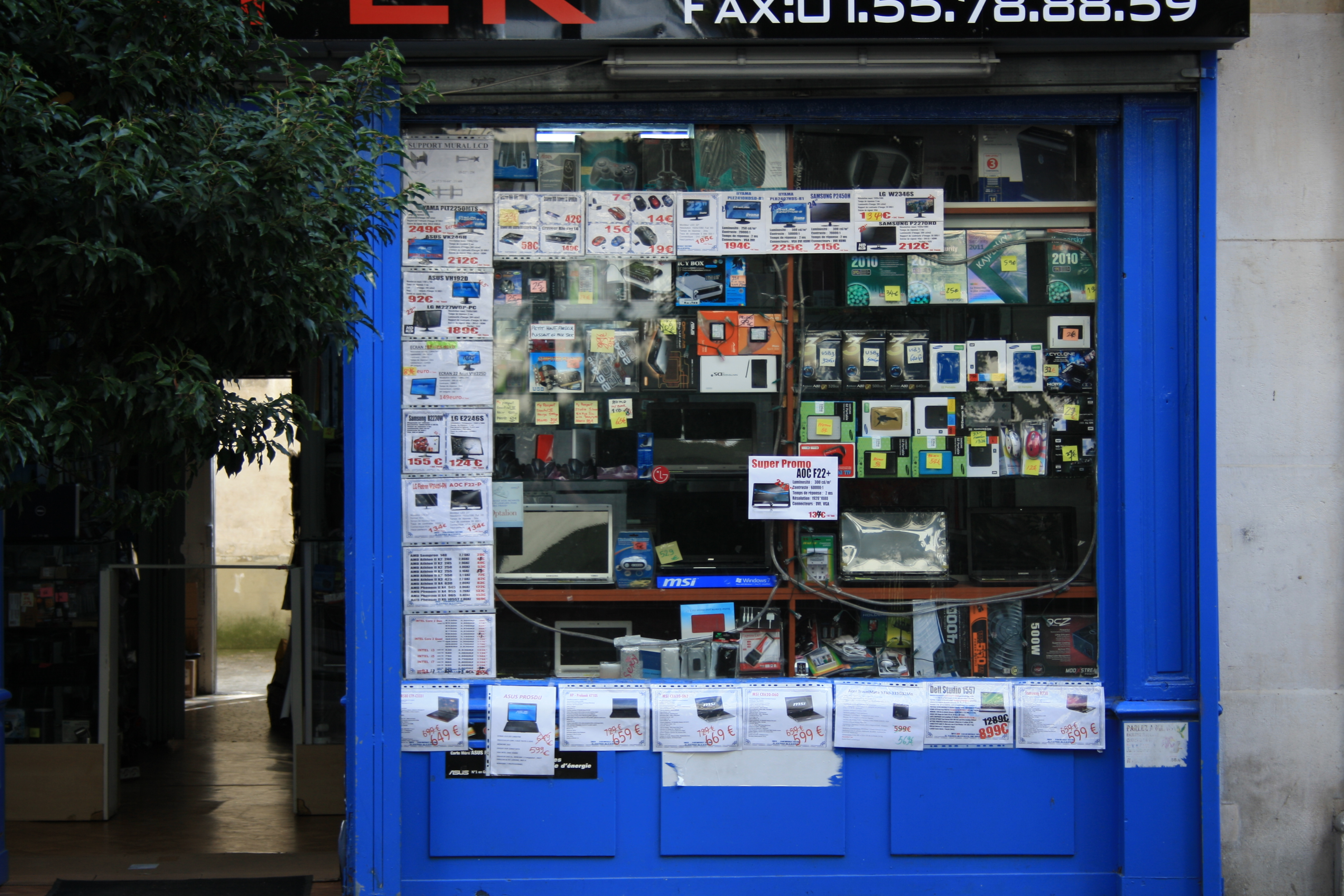
Computer shop in Paris. Advertised configurations are customizable and assembled upon order

Build to order (BTO), sometimes referred to as make to order or made to order (MTO), is a production approach where products are not built until a confirmed order is received. The end consumer determines the time and number of produced products. Ordered products are customized to meet the design requirements of an individual, organization or business. Production orders can be generated manually, through inventory and production management programs, such as configuration system. BTO is the oldest style of order fulfillment and is the most appropriate approach used for highly customized or low volume products. Industries with expensive inventory use this production approach. Made to order products are common in the food service industry, such as at restaurants.

BTO can be considered a Just in time (JIT) production system, as components or products are only delivered just in time, when demanded, in order to reduce wasted time and increase efficiency.

== Implementation ==
This approach is considered good for highly configured products, e.g. automobiles, bicycles, computer servers, or for products where holding inventories is very expensive, e.g. aircraft. In general, the BTO approach has become more popular in the last few years ever since high-tech companies such as Dell, BMW, Compaq and Gateway successfully implemented the system into their business operations.

== BTO in the automotive industry ==
In an automotive context, BTO is a demand driven production approach where a product is scheduled and built in response to a confirmed order received for it from a final customer. The final customer refers to a known individual owner and excludes all orders by the original equipment manufacturer (OEM), national sales companies (NSC), dealers or point of sales, bulk orders or other intermediaries in the supply chain. BTO excludes the order amendment function, whereby forecast orders in the pipeline are amended to customer requirements, as this is seen as another level of sophistication for a build to stock (BTS) system (also known as build to forecast (BTF)).

BTS is the dominant approach used today across many industries and refers to products that are built before a final purchaser has been identified, with production volume driven by historical demand information. This high stock level, endemic across the auto industry allows some dealers to find an exact or very close match to the customer's desired vehicle within the dealer networks and supplier parks. The vehicle can then be delivered as soon as transport can be arranged. This has been used to justify stock levels. Whilst providing a rapid response to customer demand, the approach is expensive, mainly in terms of stock, but also transportation as finished goods are rarely where they are required. Holding stock of such a high cash value as finished goods is a key driver of the current crisis in the automotive industry - a crisis that could be eased by implementation of a BTO system.

A BTO system does not mean that all suppliers in the supplier chain should be producing only when a customer order has been confirmed. Clearly, it would not make economic sense for a manufacturer of low value high volume parts to employ BTO. It is appropriate that these should be identified and built to a supplier order, effectively BTS. Part of the challenge in a BTO supplier network is in the identification of which suppliers should be BTO and which BTS. The point in the supply chain when this change occurs is called the ‘decoupling point’. Currently, the majority of automotive supply chains lack a decoupling point and the dominant BTS approach has resulted in billions of dollars of capital being tied up in stock in the supply chain.

Some firms build all their products to order while others practice (BTS). Given the widespread proliferation of products, there are a number of manufacturers taking a combined approach, where some items are BTS and others are BTO, which is commonly referred to as "hybrid BTO".

== Advantages ==
The main advantages of the BTO approach in environments of high product variety is the ability to supply the customer with the exact product specification required, the reduction in sales discounts and finished good inventory, as well a reduction in stock obsolescence risk. Additionally, flexibility and customer lead time are improved to a match changes in consumer demand. Moreover, a business’ cash flow can be increased with BTO.

== Disadvantages ==
The main disadvantage of BTO is manufacturers are susceptible to market demand fluctuations leading to a reduced capacity utilization in manufacturing. Hence, to ensure an effective use of production resources, a BTO approach should be coupled with proactive demand management. Finding the correct and appropriate balance of BTO and BTS to maintain stock levels appropriate to both the market requirement and operational stability is a current area of academic research. In Retail, an occurring problem may be customers choosing an alternative product that is available at that time and place, as they are not willing to wait for the BTO product to arrive. Moreover, compared to mass production, customization of products implies higher costs. Thus, price-conscious customers may be turned away, as they do not feel a strong need for customized products and would therefore choose a more standardized product instead.

== Related approaches ==
Related approaches to BTO include the following:

=== Engineer to Order (ETO) approach ===
In ETO, after an order is received, a part of or the whole design starts to be developed. Construction by general contractors and plant construction by engineering companies are categorized as ETO.

=== Assemble to Order (ATO) approach ===
This strategy requires that basic parts of the product are already manufactured, however not yet assembled. Once a customer's order has been received, the parts of the product are quickly being assembled and sent out.

Together with the BTS approach, these strategies form the spectrum of order fulfillment strategies a firm can adopt.

== See also ==
- Bespoke
- Configurator
- Print on demand
- Mass customization
- Sales Order
- Assemble-to-order system
