= Assemble-to-order system =

In applied probability, an assemble-to-order system is a model of a warehouse operating a build to order policy where products are assembled from components only once an order has been made. The time to assemble a product from components is negligible, but the time to create components is significant (for example, they must be ordered from a supplier).

Research typically focuses on finding good policies for inventory levels and on the impact of different configurations (such as having more shared parts). The special case of only one product is an assembly system, the case of just once component is a distribution system.

== Model definition ==
=== Single period model ===
This case is a generalisation of the newsvendor model (which has only one component and one product). The problem involves three stages and we give one formation of the problem below

1. components acquired
2. demand realized
3. components allocated, products produced

We use the following notation

Symbol	Meaning
m	total number of components
n	total number of products
a_{i}^{j}	units of component i required to make one unit of product j
d_{j}	demand for product j
y_{i}	supply for component i
p_{j}	penalty cost for unit shortage of product j
h_{i}	cost for unit excess of component i
z_{j}	production level of product j
w_{j}	shortage of product j
x_{i}	excess of component i

In the final stage when demands are known the optimization problem faced is to

$$\begin{align}
\text{minimize } G(\mathbf y, \mathbf d) &= \mathbf h' \mathbf x+ \mathbf p' \mathbf w\\
\text{subject to }
A \mathbf z + \mathbf x &= \mathbf y\\
\mathbf z + \mathbf w &= \mathbf d\\
\mathbf w, \mathbf x, \mathbf z &\geq 0,\end{align}$$

and we can therefore write the optimization problem at the first stage as

$$\begin{align}
\text{minimize } & c(\mathbf y - \mathbf x_0) + \mathbb E_{\mathbf d} [ G(\mathbf y, \mathbf d) ] \\
\text{subject to } & \mathbf y \geq \mathbf x_0,\end{align}$$

with x_{0} representing the starting inventory vector and c the cost function for acquiring the components.

=== Continuous time ===
In continuous time orders for products arrive according to a Poisson process and the time required to produce components are independent and identically distributed for each component. Two problems typically studied in this system are to minimize the expected backlog of orders subject to a constraint on the component inventory, and to minimize the expected component inventory subject to constraints on the rate at which orders must be completed.
