= USNS Mount Baker =

Ammunition ship of the United States Navy

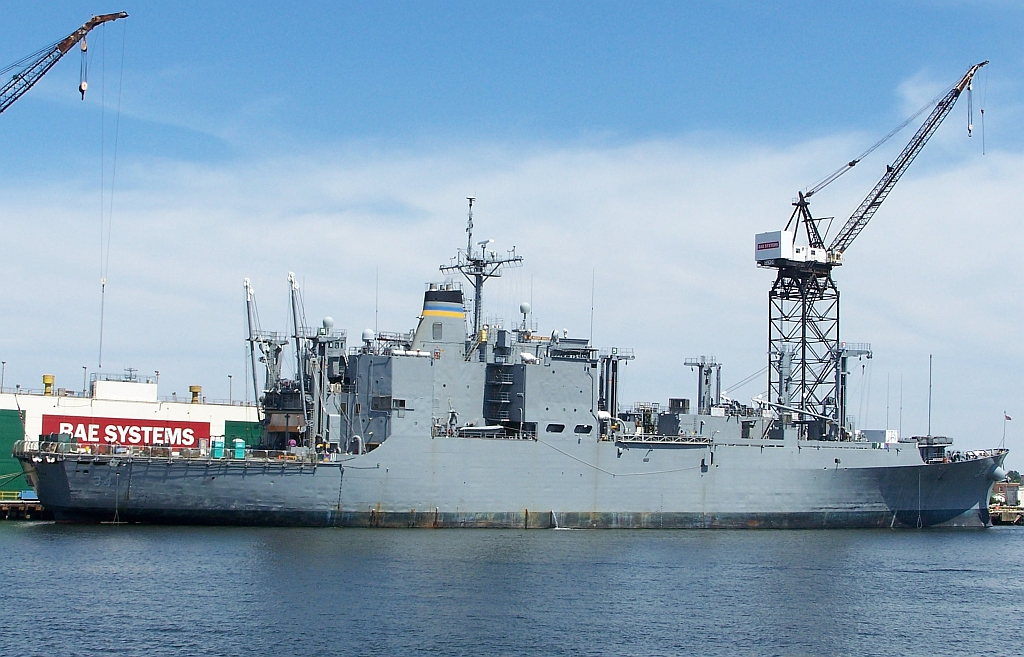
- USNS Mount Baker (T-AE-34)

History

United States
- Name: USNS Mount Baker (T-AE-34)
- Namesake: Mount Baker
- Awarded: 8 March 1968
- Builder: Ingalls Shipbuilding
- Laid down: 5 October 1970
- Launched: 23 October 1971
- Commissioned: 22 July 1972
- Decommissioned: 18 December 1996
- In service: 18 December 1996
- Out of service: 2 August 2010
- Identification: IMO number: 8937053
- Fate: Scrapped 2012

General characteristics
- Class & type: Kilauea-class ammunition ship
- Displacement: 20,000 tons (20,300 t) full load
- Length: 564.3 ft (172.0 m) overall
- Beam: 81 ft (25 m)
- Draft: 28 ft (8.5 m)
- Propulsion: Three Foster-Wheeler boilers; 600 psi (42 kg/cm², 4.2 MPa); 870 °F (470 °C); 1 turbine, 22,000 hp (16.4 MW); single six-bladed propeller; Automated Propulsion System (APS)
- Speed: 20 knots
- Capacity: 60,000 ft^{3}/6,000 tons of ammunition
- Complement: 125 civilians, 55 naval personnel (including a helicopter detachment)
- Aircraft carried: Two CH-46 helicopters
- Aviation facilities: Hangar and landing pad

USNS Mount Baker (T-AE-34) was the seventh of eight Kilauea-class ammunition ships. She served in the United States Navy from 1972 to 1996 and with the Military Sealift Command from 1996 to 2010. She was scrapped in 2012.

== History ==
She is the second U.S. Navy ship to bear the name, and is named for Mount Baker, a 10,781-foot volcano in the Cascade Range of Washington. Ammunition ships operated by Military Sealift Command provide logistic support to US Navy ships at sea.

=== USS Mount Baker (AE-34) ===
Mount Baker was built by Ingalls Shipbuilding, Pascagoula, Mississippi. She was commissioned 22 July 1972 as USS Mount Baker (AE-34) and entered service with the Atlantic Fleet.

In 1976, the Chief of Naval Operations authorized the testing of the LAMPS MK III System aboard her flight deck. Later that year, Mount Baker gave support to rescue operations of the Navy's nuclear-powered submersible (NR-1). In 1977, she was awarded the Battle E as the best ammunition ship in the Atlantic Fleet.

=== USNS Mount Baker (T-AE-34) ===
On 18 December 1996, Mount Baker decommissioned and was placed in service with the Military Sealift Command. The ship's designation was changed to T-AE-34. Previously, she provided ammunition onload and offload support to U.S. Navy ships operating in the Atlantic and Indian Oceans and the Mediterranean.

On 20 July 2009, the Navy announced that the ship would be inactivated on 2 August 2010. She was laid up at the Naval Inactive Ship Maintenance Facility in Philadelphia, PA, waiting to be sunk as a target, but she was apparently sold for scrapping c. June 2012 and towed to Brownsville, Texas, for dismantling, circa 7 July 2012.
