= Vertical replenishment =

Supply of vessels by helicopter

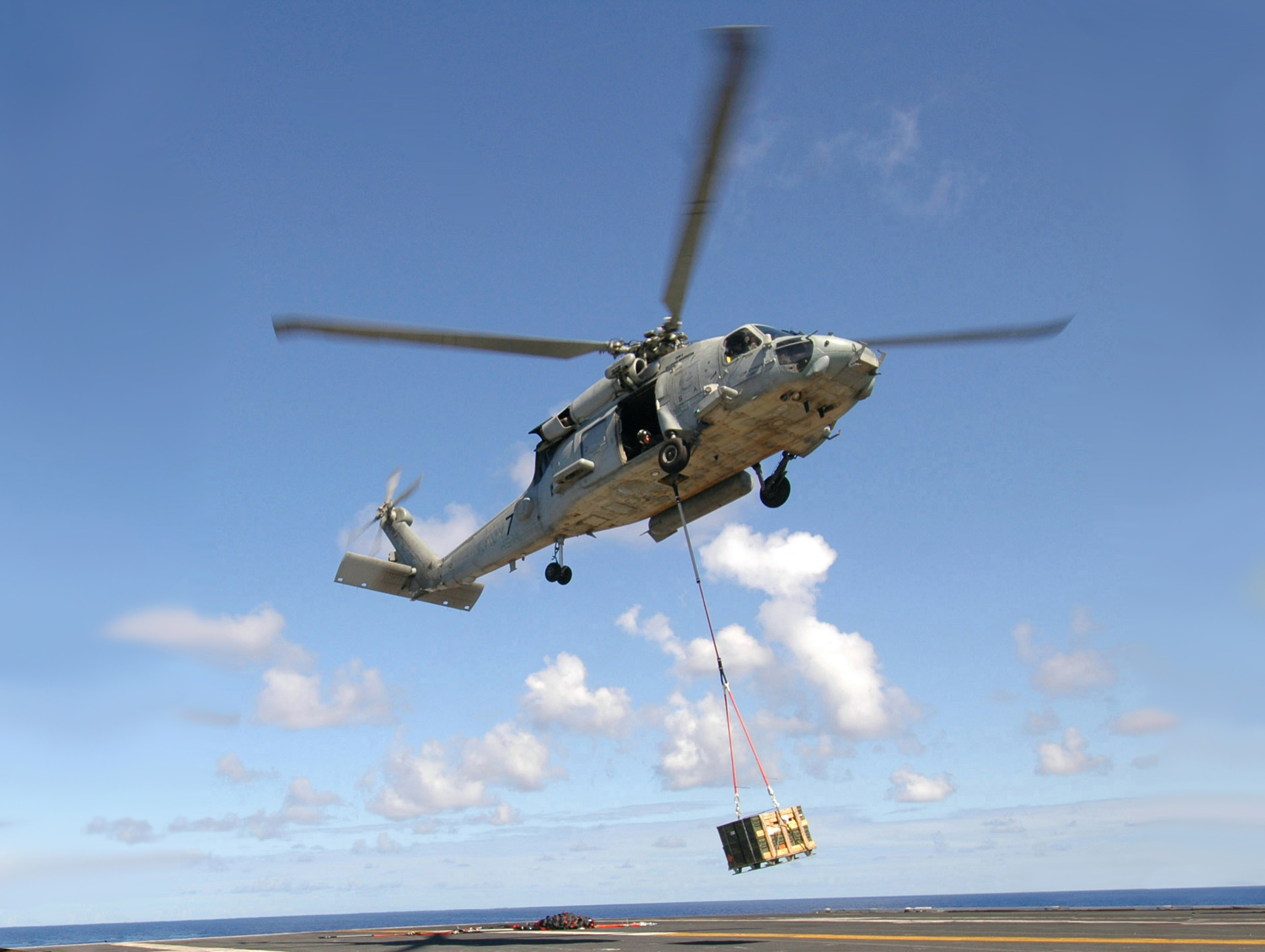
A SH-60 Sea Hawk delivers cargo to the aircraft carrier USS George Washington

Vertical replenishment, or VERTREP, is a method of supply of seaborne vessels by helicopter. The United States Department of Defense defines VERTREP as:

...the transfer of cargo between ships using helicopters. VERTREP is often used to supplement connected replenishment. Weapons loads, generally limited to 1,800 kg (4,000 pounds), are transferred from the supply ship to the flight deck of the amphibious ship. The decided advantage of a VERTREP is that it can effect replenishment without ship-to-ship connection.

== History ==
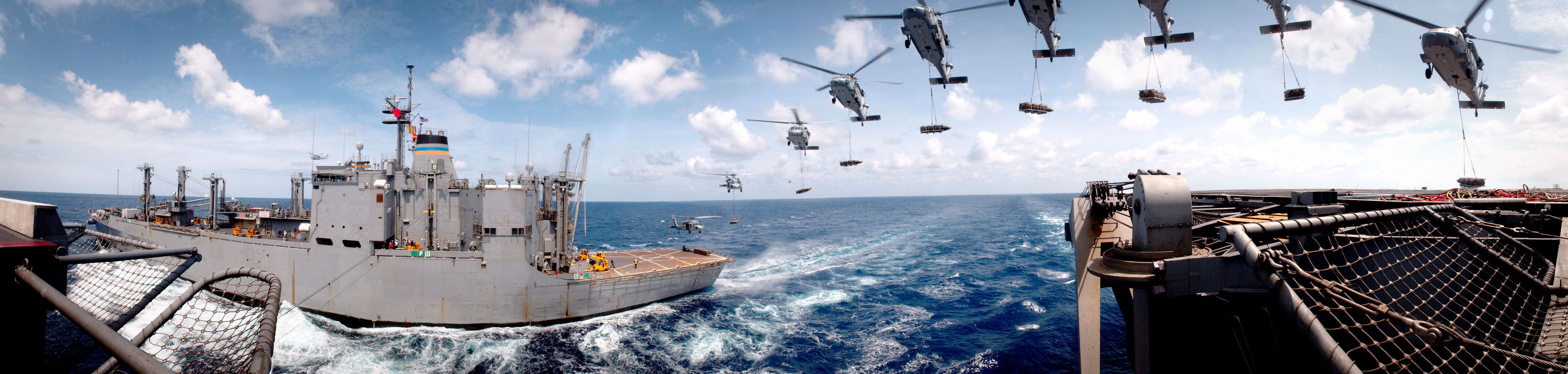
USS Harry S. Truman and USNS Mount Baker transfer, 1 May 2004

The United States Sixth Fleet had developed VERTREP routines in 1962 with SH-3 Sea King helicopters operating from USS Mississinewa and USS Altair. Each ship carried one SH-3. At that time, there was some anticipation that nuclear-powered ships might reduce the need for alongside refueling. Altair performed the first night VERTREP to an aircraft carrier in 1965.

Modern United States Navy VERTREP procedures were initiated from USS Sacramento in November 1964. Sacramento embarked two CH-46 Sea Knight helicopters to enable simultaneous transfer of ammunition by helicopter while petroleum fuels were pumped through conventional alongside-hose connections. Ammunition could be delivered to other ships up to 100 miles from Sacramento. Receiving ships have greater freedom of maneuver during VERTREP than conventional alongside transfers; and time loss is minimal in comparison to maneuvering alongside and rigging transfer lines. One Cold War VERTREP was accomplished while the receiving United States destroyer maintained contact with a Soviet submarine.

== Transfer methods ==
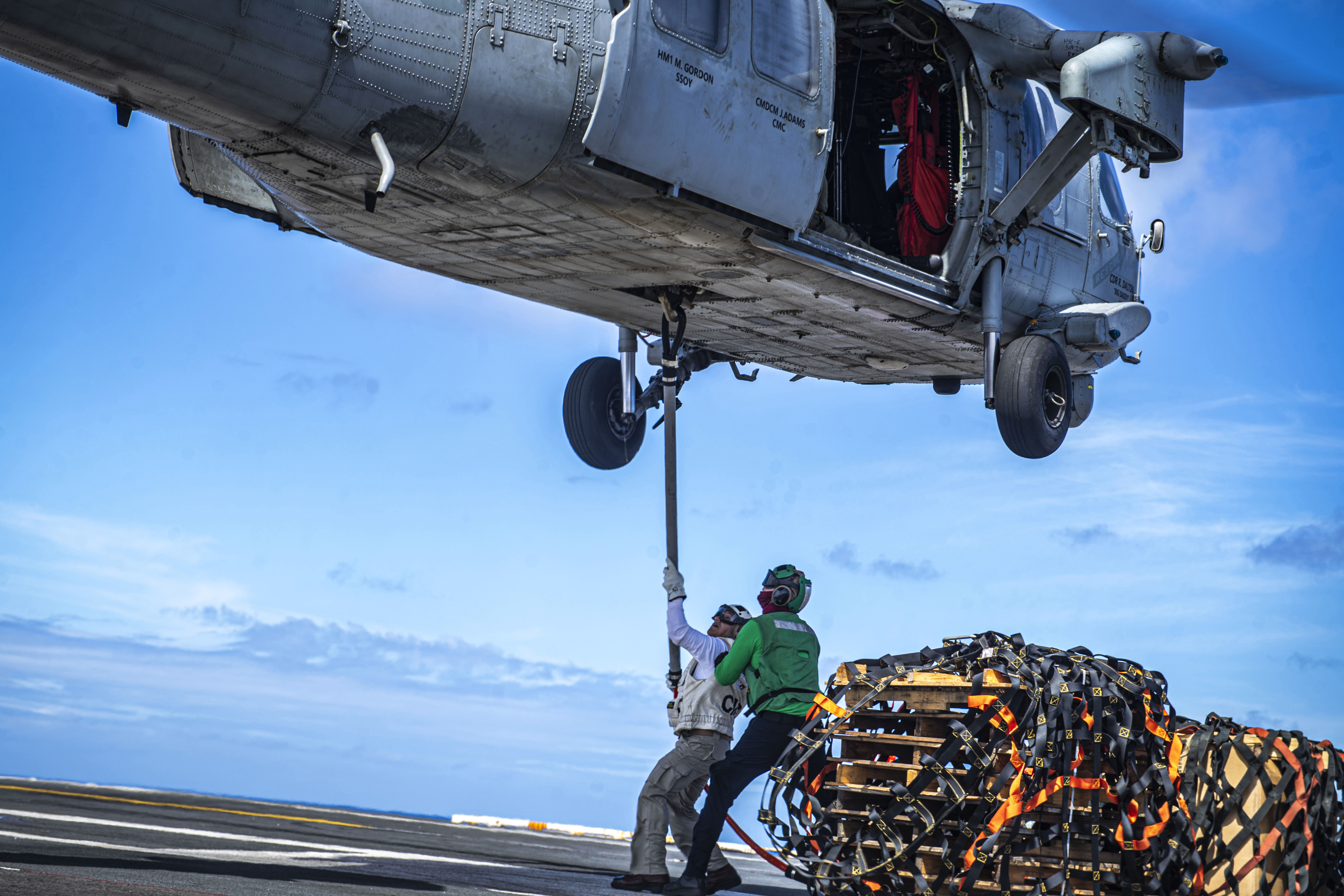
Cargo being attached to an MH-60S Sea Hawk helicopter on the flight deck of the USS Nimitz during a vertical replenishment in the Pacific Ocean, April 7, 2025.

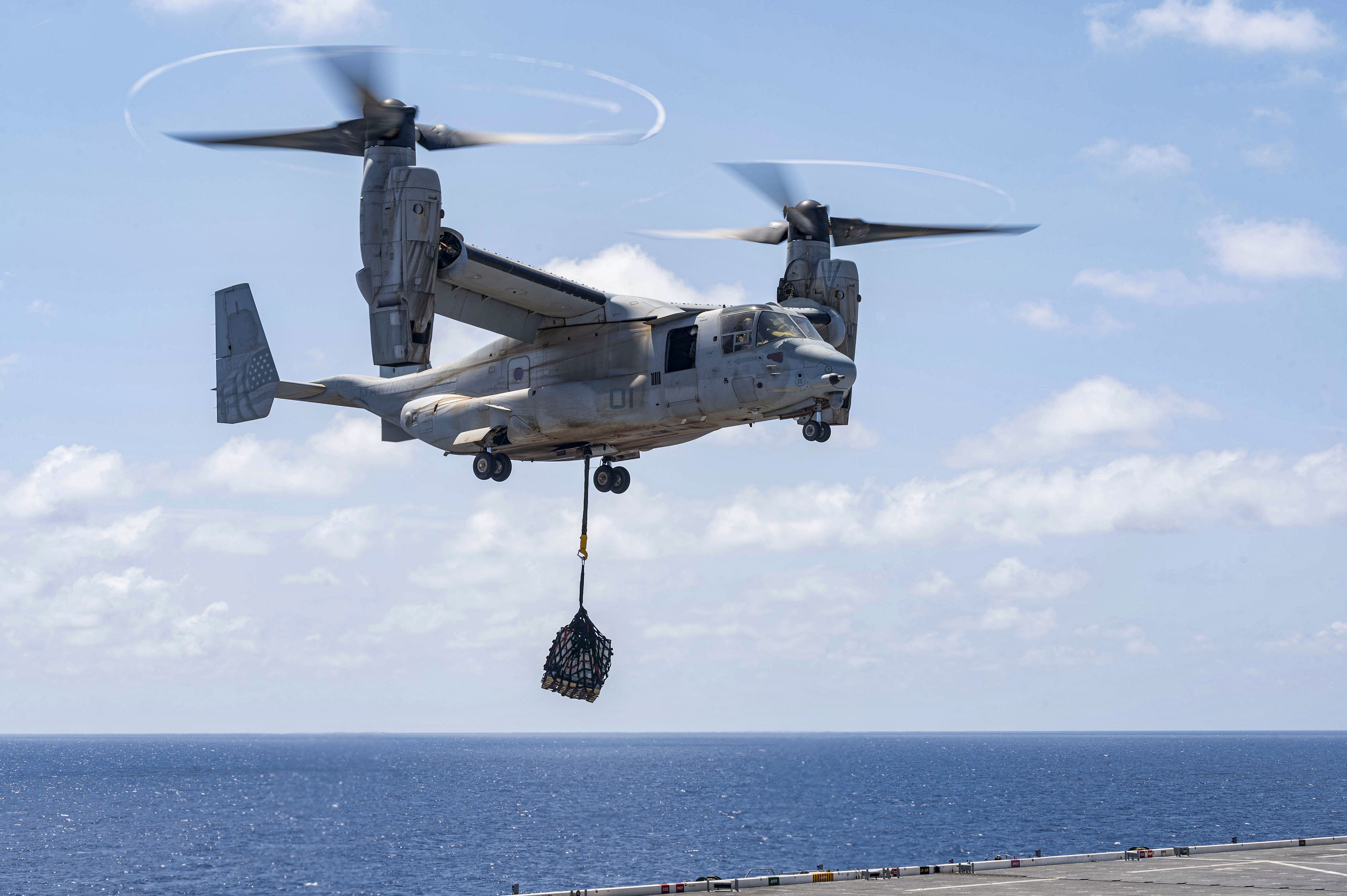
VMM-364 Marines conducting vertical replenishment training exercise with MV-22B Osprey landing on the USS Lewis B. Puller in the Red Sea, May 23, 2023.

VERTREP helicopters are equipped with a cargo hook from which may be suspended either special ordnance slings or conventional cargo nets for less sensitive loads. A normal load is two to four pallets, depending on weight. The load is placed in position on the deck of the receiving ship by lowering the helicopter slowly from a high hover, and the load can be released manually by a helicopter crewman positioned to watch the load.

In October 2020, the U.S. Navy demonstrated an ability to resupply its ballistic missile submarine USS Henry M. Jackson at sea using a drone, a C-17 Globemaster, an MH-60R Sea Hawk and a MV-22B Osprey.

== Rate of transfer ==
Ships without large flight decks or support equipment like forklifts are often unable to break down palleted loads and transfer them off of the receiving deck as rapidly as the helicopter can deliver another load. VERTREP supply ships carrying more than one helicopter can simultaneously make deliveries to several ships of a task group. Food can be handled somewhat faster than munitions because of the reduced safety considerations.

== Limitations ==
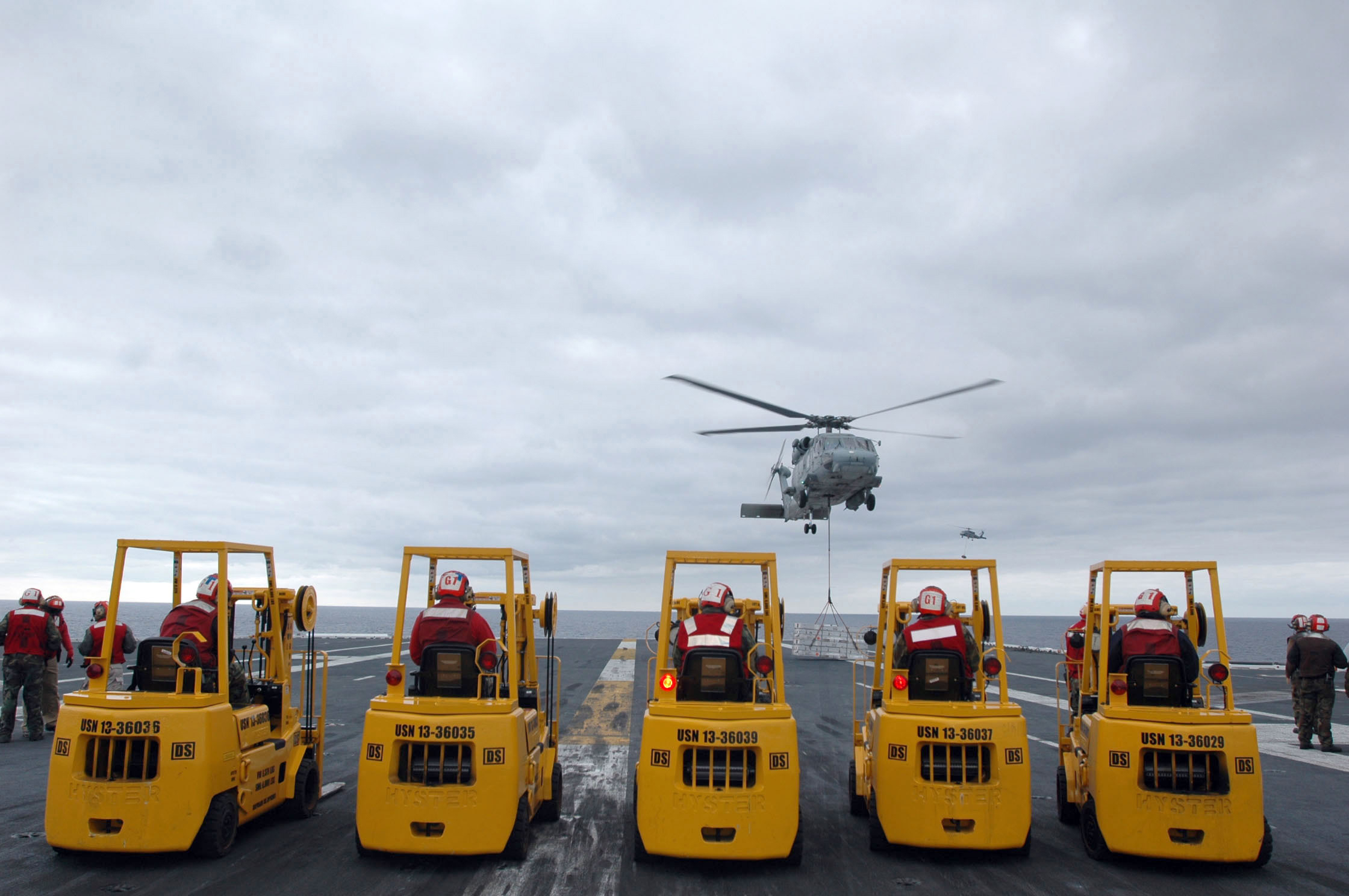
Forklifts prepare to receive cargo from an SH-60F Seahawk helicopter during a vertical replenishment on board the aircraft carrier USS John C. Stennis (CVN 74)

Lift capabilities of helicopters are reduced by adverse wind conditions or high temperature or humidity. Pre-loading of pallets is necessary for rapid transfer, and requires advance knowledge of weather conditions and special care to secure light items which may otherwise be blown out of containers. While popular in use, VERTREP is considered relatively dangerous (as compared to other replenishment methods) as it involves danger to the loading personnel due to the helicopter and the load, and in turn, potential risks to the helicopter due to Foreign Object Damage (FOD).

== See also ==
- Aerial refueling
- Carrier onboard delivery
- Military logistics
- Underway replenishment
