= Samsung Replenish =

Android 2.3 smartphone

- Manufacturer: Samsung
- First released: January 2011; 15 years ago
- Compatible networks: CDMA/DBTM 1900 MHz - SAR Values: Head 0.54 W/kg, Body worn 1.09 W/kg
- Form factor: Candybar
- Dimensions: 4.84 in (123 mm) H 2.36 in (60 mm) W 0.45 in (11 mm) D
- Weight: 4.1 oz (120 g)
- Operating system: Android 2.3 - 2.3.6 Gingerbread
- CPU: 600 MHz Qualcomm MSM76272
- Memory: 512 MB or 160 MB RAM / 512 MB ROM
- Removable storage: 32 GB microSD
- Battery: 1600 mAh, 3.7 V Internal Rechargeable Lithium Ion
- Rear camera: 2.0 MP; 4x digital zoom Shot Modes: Multi; Geo-tagging; Editing Modes; Camcorder; Online Image Uploading
- Display: TFT LCD, 2.8 in (71 mm) diagonal 240 x 320 px QVGA, Touchscreen
- Connectivity: Bluetooth® Profiles: A2DP, AVRCP, GAVDP, GOEP, HFP 1.5, HSP, OPP, PBAP, SDAP/SDP; Wi-Fi HotSpot; HTML Browser; Flash®; Java™; GPS; 3G Cellular
- Data inputs: Capacitive touchscreen QWERTY keyboard Accelerometer
- Other: Wi-Fi hotspot, USB tethering
- References: Official web site at Sprint's

The Samsung Replenish is an Android 2.3 smartphone.

This phone only supports Sprint and Boost Mobile.

== See also ==
- Galaxy Nexus
- List of Android devices
