= Digital master =

Digital asset deemed original of a work

A digital master is an image, PDF file, digital recording or another digital asset preserved as the "original" for the purpose of archival storage, reuse and re-expression. For images, it is the digital analogue to a photographic negative.

As the master from which variations for specific uses can be derived, the digital master may be in the form of its initial capture (like an unretouched photograph) or in a form that has been somehow enhanced, reformatted or edited (like a manipulated photo or a completed film).

== See also ==
- Audio mastering, a form of audio post-production
- Digital remastering, the quality enhancement of sound and/or picture to a previously existing recording
- Digital cinema, the use of digital technology to distribute or project motion pictures as opposed to the historical use of motion picture film
