= Engineer to order =

Engineer to order is a production approach characterized by:

1. Engineering activities need to be added to product lead time.
2. Upon receipt of a customer order, the order engineering requirements and specifications are not known in detail. There is a substantial amount of design and engineering analysis required.

To speed up delivery time, the adoption of concurrent engineering, integrated product team, and lean product development methodologies are used. The critical path methodology is also essential. To speed up the delivery time, many companies use customization approach (In SAP terminology it is called Variant configuration) where in, the most part of the BOM components and routing operation elements could be created automatically based on the design inputs received during quote/sales order stage. This approach speedup the BOM and routing creation process, there by help ETO companies to respond quickly to customer requirement.

Engineer to order environments must employ a flexible and adaptive, demand-driven approach to the manufacturing process. It is usually the right solution when details on a customer order are not provided and engineering development must be added to product lead time.

ETO is a technique that is leveraged to boost sales and improve margins for those companies with customers needing solutions that are tailored to fit their own unique environment. It begins with selling product concepts that don’t have fixed designs and are expected to result in a new, unique end product. This could be any product, from enterprise software applications to special aircraft to a pair of jeans. But the typical ETO environment usually deals with the design and build of unique custom engineered complex machinery and industrial equipment - one in which there is heavy involvement of the following engineering disciplines; mechanical, electrical, mechatronics, software, manufacturing and systems engineering. The ETO company works with its customers to develop new products that satisfy the customer’s requirements and specifications.

== Engineer to order vs Make to Order ==
The difference between the ETO approach to production and make to order products is that engineering original products to order includes the entire design process. In MTO companies typically have a fixed design and specifications to start with. The existing design is followed, even if the customer requests some customization of dimensions or materials. In engineering to meet unique customer orders, designs spring from collaboration with the customer, beginning with a need and a concept. Engineers do not know the final specifications, materials, or in software development, even the network or application platform until other primary concepts are ironed out. This is a much more creative process and requires a much closer relationship with clients, ultimately leading to a product that is unique.

== Process Flow ==
Engineers don’t always follow a smooth flow from step to step even in ordinary manufacturing. Most manufacturing design decisions tends to be highly iterative. It is common to create a design that meets customer approval, test it, make changes to meet specifications, and resubmit at certain stages or milestones in order for approval to proceed to the next stage. Engineer to order, due to its nature, is even more complex and client-centric. This requires on-going documentation, but the approach typically involves all of the following steps.

- Sales: A sales order is agreed upon between client and manufacturer. This will include quoted costs, delivery dates, and other basic information like a work breakdown structure (WBS) document. This is assigned to a project as an order item. Costing is usually based on actual costs related to past similar projects. This generally includes consideration of reworks and scrap.
- Scale out: This involves fine tuning for further details, such as project team and management designations, departmental labor/fabrication, re-scheduling, anticipated resources, and release of the WBS to establish and coordinate project activities.
- Procurement: A bill of materials (BOM) covering all elements is created and followed to satisfy initial requirements, as well as ownership of the end product. Work orders for each component are planned in sequence. Many customers will require lot tracking via product sheets; that is, the origin, specification, and batch number of every lot of materials used, in order to effect future reproduction or identify the source of material flaws or an unacceptable quality of finished components.
- Design begins: Research and development begins work on product realization, usually followed by an advance payment before physical product designs begin. A direct link between CAD (computer aided design) and fabrication is made more effective by eliminating the need for ERP (enterprise resource planning) input as a control.
- Milestones: Project milestones are established and applied to the order development to structure a client billing plan. A deposit or down payment is received to launch project development, but may be adjusted in final billing.
- Confirmation: Receipt of payment and approval for go-ahead of lead-time components as each milestone is realized
- MRP (material requirements planning): Planned orders for all required materials and elements are issued across the complete BOM.
- Assembly: Preliminary assembly of components and confirmation of production approval. Typically another advance payment is made.
- Delivery: Delivering of components and final assembly/installation, usually at client location.
- Trial period: After the customer has tested and accepted the product, final payment and contract settlement are made.
- Review: The manufacturer conducts analysis of cost, delivery progress, and revenue through documentation and reports related to the project.

== Quality ==
Given the unique nature of the delivered product, clients may accept certain quality risks as a consequence of meeting delivery dates. Testing and trial periods may also be limited by the nature of the product, the manufacturing required, and the metrics established for quality controls. As each product is essentially a one of a kind prototype, smaller companies on either the manufacturer or client side may not have the expertise or resources to implement use-cases, user testing, or future quality guidelines. In MTO, quality is often defined as a lack of defects, but must meet minimal levels defined in the specifications. In Engineer to Order there is no original design. Where possible, prior similar products may provide some guidelines as to testing and precision, but the idea of re-designing or modifying an existing design is necessarily a core requirement of the engineer to order concept. It does however reduce costs and time if one can use previous designs.
