= Ammunition ship =

Warship specially configured to carry ammunition

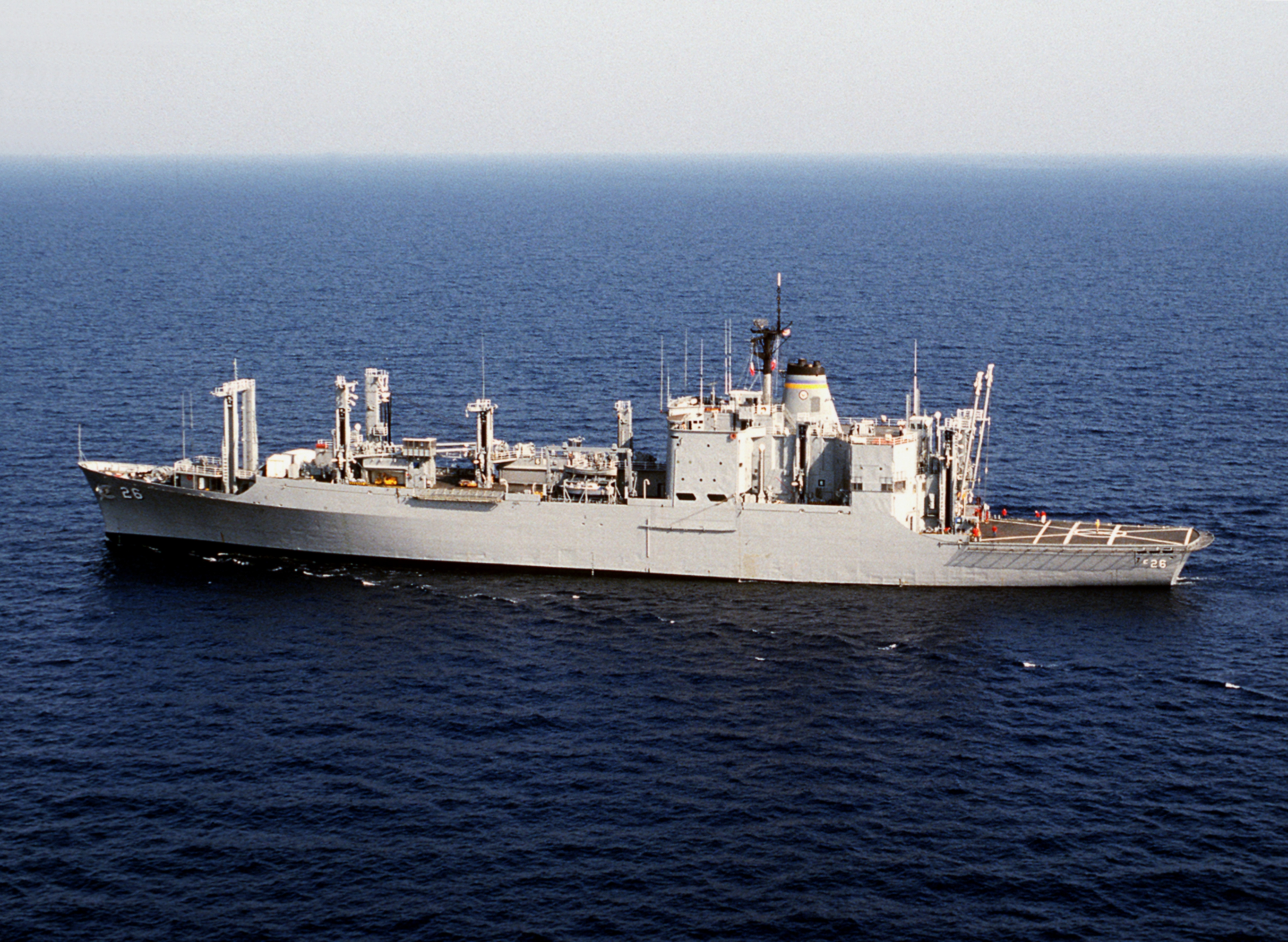
USNS Kilauea, one of the last US Navy ammunition ships

An ammunition ship is an auxiliary ship specially configured to carry ammunition, usually for naval ships and aircraft. An ammunition ship's cargo handling systems, designed with extreme safety in mind, include ammunition hoists with airlocks between decks, and mechanisms for flooding entire compartments with sea water in case of emergencies. Ammunition ships most often deliver their cargo to other ships using underway replenishment, using both connected replenishment and vertical replenishment. To a lesser extent, they transport ammunition from one shore-based weapons station to another.

== In the United States Navy ==
U.S. Navy ammunition ships are frequently named for volcanos.

During World War II, U.S. Navy ammunition ships were converted from merchant ships or specially built on merchant ship hulls, often of Type C2. They were armed, and were crewed by naval sailors. Several of them were destroyed in spectacular explosions during the war, such as USS Mount Hood, which exploded in the Admiralty Islands on November 10, 1944, and the Liberty ship SS John Burke, which was hit by a single kamikaze attack near the Philippines on December 28, 1944, and which was captured on film by an amateur photographer on a nearby vessel. The ship disintegrated in seconds with the loss of all hands. SS Canada Victory, SS Logan Victory and SS Hobbs Victory were hit by kamikaze aircraft at Okinawa and sank.

The last U.S. ammunition ships, the Kilauea class, have been replaced by the Lewis and Clark-class dry cargo ships, which also include carrying dry and refrigerated cargo.

== See also ==
- List of auxiliaries of the United States Navy § Ammunition ships (AE)
