= Naval Station Bremerton =

Former station of the United States Navy, closed in 2004

Naval Station Bremerton Pacific Reserve Fleet, Bremerton
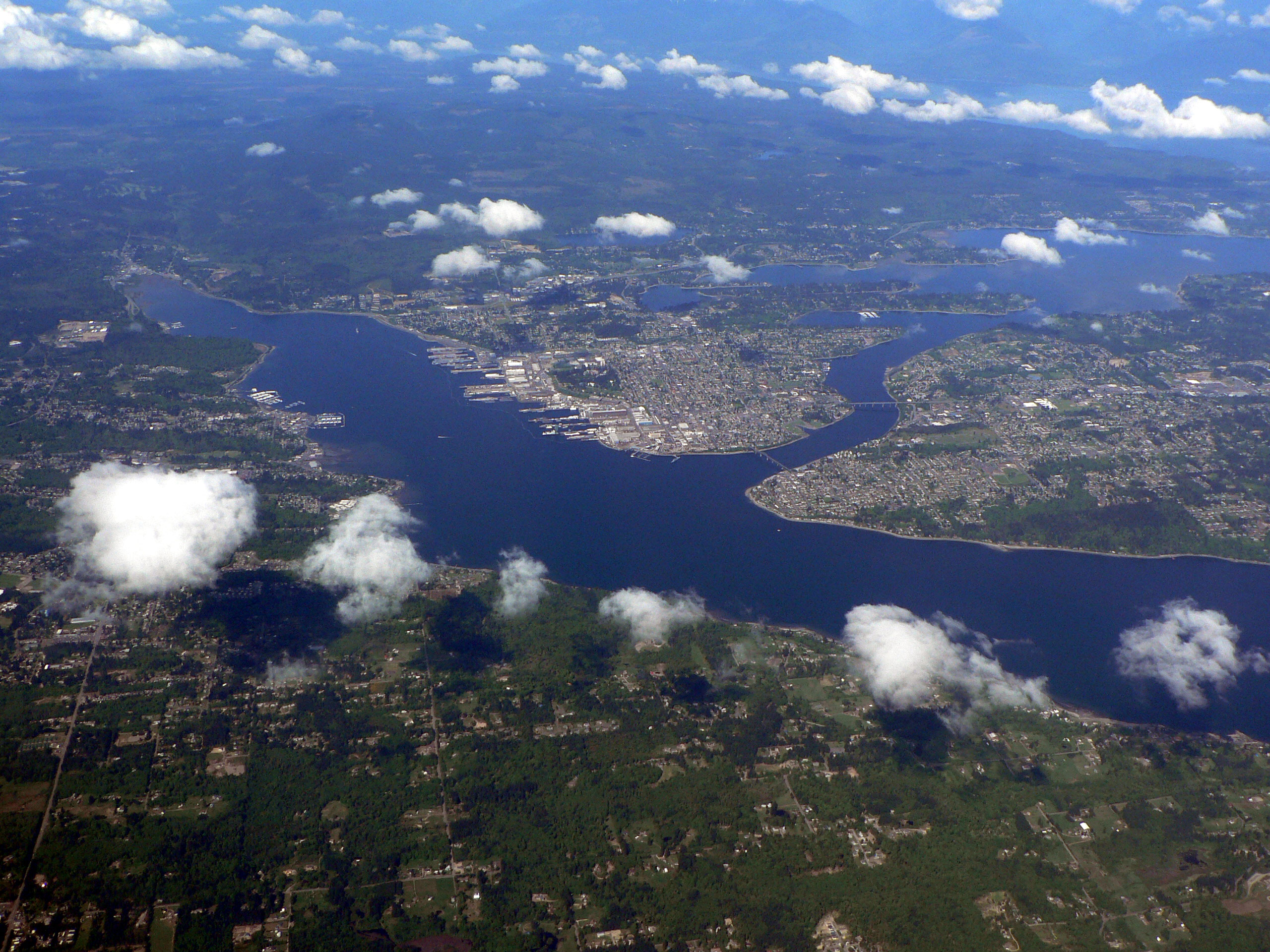
- Naval Station Bremerton - Pacific Reserve Fleet, Bremerton on the Sinclair Inlet

Site information
- Type: United States Navy base

Location
- Coordinates: 47°33′36.60″N 122°39′0.74″W

Naval Station Bremerton is a former station of the United States Navy that was merged with Naval Submarine Base Bangor into Naval Base Kitsap in 2004. Kitsap serves as host command for the Navy's fleet throughout the Pacific Northwest. It is home to the Puget Sound Naval Shipyard and Intermediate Maintenance Facility. In addition to performing drydock and overhaul services for active naval vessels, it is also home to an inactive ship facility for several decommissioned warships, including aircraft carriers. Naval Hospital Bremerton is also located aboard the installation as a tenant command.

== Pacific Reserve Fleet, Bremerton ==
Pacific Reserve Fleet, Bremerton opened in 1946 in the Sinclair Inlet and was a United States Navy reserve fleets, also called a mothball fleet, was used to store the many surplus ships after World War II. Pacific Reserve Fleet, Bremerton was part of the reserve fleet, was used to store the now many surplus ships after World War II. Some ships in the fleet were reactivated for the Korean War and Vietnam War. The site became a Naval Inactive Ship Maintenance Facility.

== Notable Reserve Fleet ships ==
List of Reserve Fleet ships that have been sold, sunk or scrapped:

- Independence, aircraft carrier
- Kitty Hawk, supercarrier
- Constellation, supercarrier
- Ranger, supercarrier
- Oliver Hazard Perry-class frigates
- USS Dubuque (LPD-8), Austin-class amphibious transport dock
- USS John D. Henley (DD-553), a Fletcher-class destroyer
- USS LCI(L)-652 an LCI(L)-351-class landing craft infantry
- USS Berkshire County (LST-288) LST-1-class tank landing ship
- USS Nassau (CVE-16) a Bogue-class escort carrier

List of ships that are still in Naval Base Kitsap:

- Ex-USS Bunker Hill CG-52
- Ex-USS Coronado LCS-4
- Ex-USS Freedom LCS-1
- Ex-USS Independence LCS-2
- Ex-USS Lake Champlain CG-57
- Ex-USS Mobile Bay CG-53
- Ex-USNS Rainier T-AOE-7
- Ex-USNS Bridge T-AOE-10
