= USS Buchanan (DDG-14) =

Charles F. Adams-class destroyer

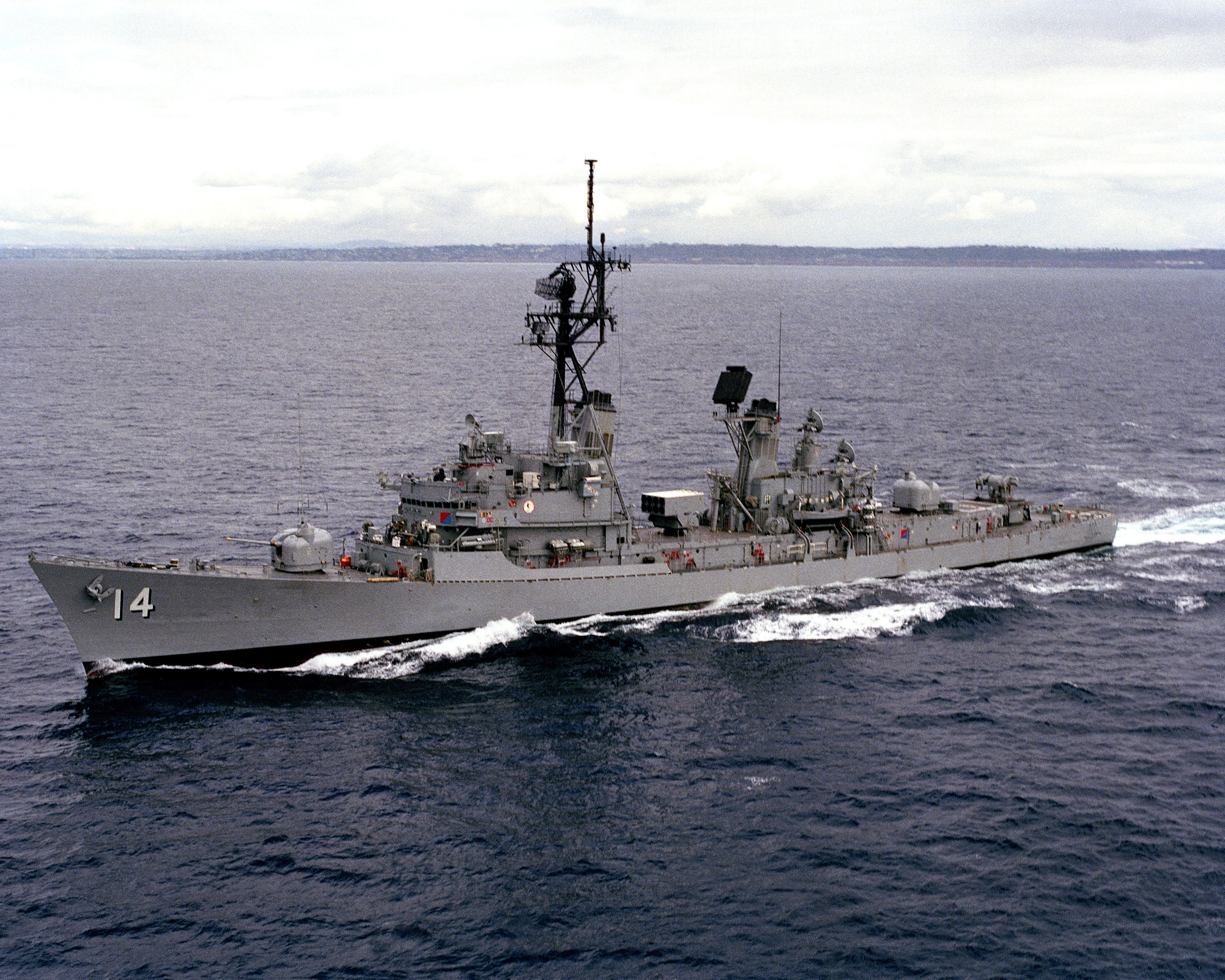
- USS Buchanan underway in 1990

History

United States
- Name: Buchanan
- Namesake: USS Buchanan (DD-484)
- Ordered: 17 January 1958
- Builder: Todd-Pacific Shipbuilding
- Laid down: 23 April 1959
- Launched: 11 May 1960
- Acquired: 31 January 1962
- Commissioned: 7 February 1962
- Decommissioned: 1 October 1991
- Stricken: 20 November 1992
- Identification: Callsign: NUOU; Hull number: DDG-14
- Motto: Audares Juvo; (I assist the bold); Nobilus est ira Leonis; (The Wrath of the Lion is Noble)
- Fate: Sunk as target 14 June 2000
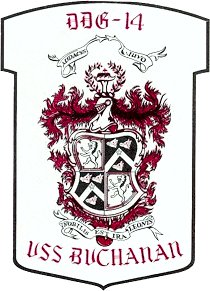
- Badge

General characteristics
- Class & type: Charles F. Adams-class destroyer
- Displacement: 3,277 tons standard; 4,526 tons full load
- Length: 437 ft (133 m)
- Beam: 47 ft (14 m)
- Draft: 15 ft (4.6 m)
- Propulsion: 2 × Westinghouse steam turbines providing 70,000 shp (52 MW); 2 shafts; 4 × Foster-Wheeler 1,275 psi (8,790 kPa) boilers
- Speed: 33 knots (61 km/h; 38 mph)
- Range: 4,500 nautical miles (8,300 km) at 20 knots (37 km/h)
- Complement: 354 (24 officers, 330 enlisted)
- Sensors & processing systems: AN/SPS-39 3D air search radar; AN/SPS-10 surface search radar; AN/SPG-51 missile fire control radar; AN/SPG-53 gunfire control radar; AN/SQS-23 Sonar and the hull mounted SQQ-23 Pair Sonar for DDG-2 through 19; AN/SPS-40 Air Search Radar
- Armament: 1 Mk 11 missile launcher (DDG2-14) or Mk 13 single arm missile launcher (DDG-15-24) for RIM-24 Tartar SAM system, or later the RIM-66 Standard (SM-1) and Harpoon antiship missile; 2 × 5"/54 caliber Mark 42 (127 mm) gun; 1 × RUR-5 ASROC Launcher; 6 × 12.8 in (324 mm) ASW Torpedo Tubes (2 x Mark 32 Surface Vessel Torpedo Tubes)

USS Buchanan (DDG-14) was a Charles F. Adams-class guided missile destroyer in service with the United States Navy from 1962 to 1991. She was sunk as a target in 2000.

== History ==
Buchanan was named for Admiral Franklin Buchanan and was laid down by Todd-Pacific Shipbuilding at Seattle, Washington on 23 April 1959, launched on 11 May 1960, and commissioned on 7 February 1962. She was commissioned by the Commandant, Thirteenth Naval District, Rear Admiral George C. Towner.

=== 1962–1965 ===
After completing her final outfitting at Puget Sound Naval Shipyard, Bremerton, Washington, Buchanan got underway for Long Beach Naval Shipyard, California, on 25 March 1962. She moored at her new homeport of San Diego, on 5 April. The destroyer reported for duty and was assigned to serve as the flagship of Destroyer Squadron 15, Cruiser-Destroyer Flotilla 7, United States First Fleet. On 25 May 1962 the destroyer put to sea for Pearl Harbor, Hawaii, for her shakedown cruise.

The Buchanan arrived at Pearl Harbor on 30 May and participated in the dedication of the USS Arizona Memorial. She returned to San Diego on 6 June to continue her shakedown before proceeding to Puget Sound on 17 September 1962. Buchanan returned to San Diego on 5 November 1962, where she was placed on unrestricted availability with the fleet.

The Buchanan began operating in 1963 in the area off Southern California before departing for her first deployment to the western Pacific. She put out for Pearl Harbor with the destroyer Somers on 4 April. Once at Pearl Harbor, she was placed in drydock for a few days (9–14 April).

The Buchanan returned to sea in company with Somers on 18 April and operated with Task Force 77.3.1, consisting of attack aircraft carrier Coral Sea, radar picket destroyers Southerland and Hanson, for the 21st commemoration of the Battle of the Coral Sea at Sydney, Australia. As the task force neared Sydney, Buchanan detached on 27 April and steamed independently for Melbourne, Australia. After the festivities in Sydney concluded, she rendezvoused with Coral Sea and the newly formed Task Group 77.6 en route to Guam on 13 May.

Over the next two months, the Buchanan accompanied TF 77.6 to Guam (22–26 May), Naval Station Subic Bay (27 May–1 June) and Manila, Philippines (25–29 June), Hong Kong (13–20 June), and Yokosuka (9–15 July) and Sasebo, Japan (22–29 July 1963). On 5 August, she tested her Tartar missiles in the Okinawa Missile Range before putting into Okinawa (9–12 August), Beppu (22–26), and Iwakuni, Japan (26–26 August). Afterward she returned to Yokosuka (7–21 September) for upkeep, giving her crew shore leave. The Buchanan returned to Sasebo (2–3 October) and Yokosuka (9–16 October) before putting into Subic Bay on 21 October. She departed Subic Bay to make a port call at Hong Kong on 29 October.

While at Hong Kong, the destroyer's rest was abruptly cut short. On 1 November 1963, members of the Republic of Vietnam military staged a coup against the regime of President Ngo Dinh Diem. In response, the U.S. Navy deployed a flotilla off the mouth of the Mekong River for the potential evacuation of American citizens and service members. As part of this operation, The Buchanan departed Hong Kong escorting the aircraft carrier Hancock with Southerland and Lyman K. Swenson on 2 November. The coup had ended with assassination of Diệm, his brother Ngȏ Ðình Nhu, and Col. Hồ Tần Quyền, the commander of the Vietnamese navy. With reassurance from the new leadership under General Dương Văn Minh that order had been restored and alliances unchanged, the Navy reduced its presence off of South Vietnam.

The Buchanan departed the area on 5 November for Subic Bay. On 15 November 1963 she left Subic Bay for San Diego arriving on 27 November. After the holidays, Buchanan operated out of San Diego before moving to the San Francisco Naval Shipyard at Hunters Point, California (USA), for overhaul (7 May–22 September). Several days after emerging from overhaul, she rejoined Destroyer Squadron 15 to participate in fleet exercise "Union Square" (28 September – 1 October 1964).

=== Vietnam War ===
On 5 January 1965, Buchanan departed with destroyers Chevalier, Rowan and Black for Pearl Harbor. She left for Subic Bay on 13 January with England, Dale, Hamner, Wiltsie, and Chevalier, putting into their destination on 26 January. On 1 February Buchanan began her tour of duty patrolling, providing escort and plane guard services in the South China Sea. As the situation worsened in Southeast Asia, President Lyndon B. Johnson began increasing the number of American troops in South Vietnam. On 8 March 1965 the 9th Marine Expeditionary Brigade landed at Da Nang.

In between operations, Buchanan visited Yokosuka (28 April–7 May, 18–26 June, and 23–26 July), Hong Kong (9–13 June and 16–19 July), Subic Bay (14 June), and Okinawa (28 June). On 27 July 1965 Buchanan set course for the United States. She stopped at Pearl Harbor for a few days (2–3 August) before mooring at San Diego on 9 August. In mid-September, the destroyer entered Long Beach for overhaul (16 September–11 November) then spent the rest of the year conducting local operations. For her time in the South China Sea, Buchanan was awarded the Armed Services Expeditionary Forces Medal for supporting air strike operations over Vietnam.

During the early months of 1966, Buchanan operated out of her homeport conducting routine operations in the eastern Pacific. During April the destroyer participated in the fleet exercise "Gray Ghost" (12–22 April 1966). In June she was steaming for the western Pacific with Black and Southerland for another six-month deployment (11 June–21 December). On 1 July, Buchanan operated as a plane guard in Dixie Station, off the Mekong Delta, for the aircraft carrier Intrepid as her aircraft executed air strikes in South Vietnam. Buchanan then moved north for operations in Yankee Station off Da Nang and the coast of North Vietnam (7–21 July). She broke from her combat operations to serve as the flagship of the United States Seventh Fleet during a port visit to Bangkok, Thailand, on 25–29 July 1966. Over the next several months, Buchanan alternated her operations between Yankee and Dixie stations. Wrapping up combat duty, she put into Hong Kong for a few days' rest (21–26 November) before working her way home via Okinawa (28–29 November), Yokosuka (1–4 December), and Pearl Harbor (15 December). She put into San Diego on 21 December 1966 where she remained until shifting to Long Beach Naval Shipyard for overhaul (15 March–5 August 1967), returning to San Diego for sea trials, refresher training for her crew, and local operations.

==== 1967 collision ====
While underway in a column formation with Southerland on the night of 14 September 1967 Buchanan collided with fishing vessel Holiday. The civilian craft claimed that the destroyer was at fault for the collision and that the Navy was culpable for the resulting damages. An ensuing investigation determined that Buchanan was the vessel with the right of way and that Holiday bore the burden to avoid the collision. Lookouts on the destroyer also indicated in subsequent interviews that there was no one in the fishing boat's wheel house at the time of the collision. The sailors' accounts also reported bright lights on the stern of Holiday and seeing crew members working on deck, perhaps preparing bait.

Although all indications exonerated Buchanan, the ship's crew clearly made errors that contributed to the accident. It was revealed that the officer of the deck lacked the experience and training to properly handle the situation. Lt. Victor J. Monteleon was qualified to command the ship while she operated independently but not certified to operate in formation with other ships. At the time of the accident, the sea was calm with visibility estimated to have been better than 12 km. The destroyer was steaming in a darkened condition with her navigation lights burning. As the vessels converged, Buchanan's Combat Information Center properly and continually reported Holiday's position, speed and bearing. Monteleon served as the junior officer of the deck, and Lt. Thomas S. Ballard, USNR, were also tracking Holiday visually from the port wing. The two officers discussed changing course but took no action. Once Monteleon realized that a collision was imminent, he ordered the conn to right full rudder with all engines ahead at full speed.

The Navy investigation into the collision determined that, although the destroyer had the right of way, Monteleon had committed several grievous errors. The most serious was the failure to notify his commanding officer, Capt. William A. Spencer, of the situation. According to Spencer's night orders, he was to be notified of any visual or radar contacts within five miles (8 km) of the ship. Additionally, Monteleon failed to take action to avoid the collision. He also did not sound a danger signal, an option provided to him in accordance to the rules of the road. As the legalities were being sorted out, Buchanan went about her schedule. On 3 November she entered Hunters Point for alterations until 20 December 1967. Buchanan spent the rest of the year in San Diego on holiday leave and preparing for another deployment.

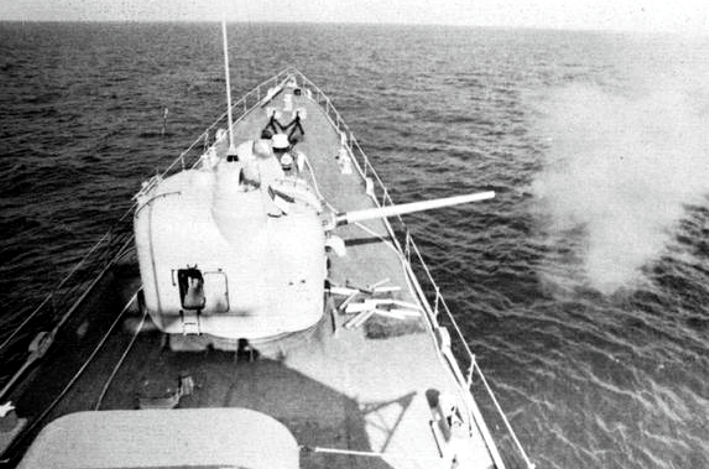
Buchanan shelling targets in Vietnam, in 1968

Buchanan departed San Diego for Southeast Asia on 27 January 1968. During her deployment, she participated in Operation Sea Dragon (25 October 1966 – 31 October 1968) to disrupt the flow of supplies going from North Vietnam to support communist operations in South Vietnam. She also provided naval gunfire support (NGFS) to ground troops fighting in South Vietnam, most notably during the first phase of the Tet Offensive and the Battle of Huế (30 January – 3 March 1968). During one tour providing NGFS, Buchanan came under fire from an enemy shore battery on 29 May. The ship sustained shrapnel damage to the heating and cooling system of the No. 1 cell of her ASROC launcher. Several of her antennae and electrical cables were damaged but no crewmembers were harmed. In response, Buchanan silenced the enemy position with 20 rounds from her 5-inch guns.

In addition to her gunnery operations, Buchanan also served as plane guard in Gulf of Tonkin for Kitty Hawk (5–11 and 14–18 March), Enterprise, and Ticonderoga (15–17 May), in addition to America and Bon Homme Richard (20 June–1 July 1968). Buchanan retired to Subic Bay (9–17 June) for battle damage repairs after another tour providing NGFS to the I Corps Tactical Zone (30 May–7 June). During her time in the western Pacific, Buchanan was afforded rest and recreation at Hong Kong (7–11 May, 16–21 July) and Yokosuka, Japan (26–28 July) before setting a course home, stopping at Midway Atoll on 2 August and Pearl Harbor on 5 August along the way. Once back in San Diego on 11 August 1968, her sailors were granted post-deployment leave for four weeks.

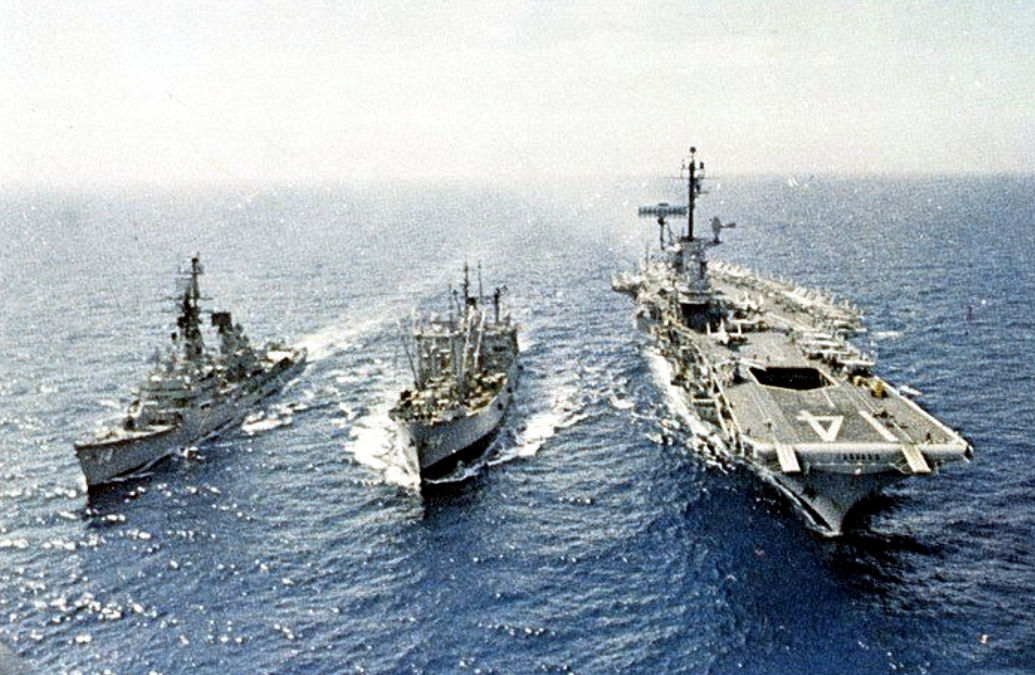
Firedrake replenishes Ticonderoga and Buchanan in 1969

On 18 March 1969 Buchanan was once again underway for the western Pacific with Bon Homme Richard, Rowan, Chevalier, and Southerland. During this deployment, the destroyer once again served as a plane guard for Ticonderoga in the Gulf of Tonkin (8–24 May) and provided NGFS for troops in the I and II Corps Tactical Zones. Her guns supported the men of the 3rd Marine Infantry Regiment and the 173rd Airborne Brigade in the area of Da Nang (16 June–16 July 1969). During these operations Buchanan sent more than five thousand 127 mm shells downrange toward the enemy. Buchanan made several port calls for upkeep and rest for her weary crewmen at Subic Bay (30 April–8 May, 2–4 September), Sasebo (28 May–8 June, 5–16 August, 25–30 August) and Hong Kong (18–24 July) before steaming for San Diego on 4 September 1969. Once back at her home port on 18 September, Buchanan underwent a survey and inspection (24–26 November), ending the year working with destroyer tender Samuel Gompers.

Buchanan spent the first half of 1970 operating in the relative calm of the eastern Pacific. She continued tender duty with Samuel Gompers (1–3 January) and Dixie (3–6 April). Installation of her new SAMID system began on 4 January and was completed by 1 February after which she put to sea to provide plane guard services for Bon Homme Richard (6–9 February). It was not until 13 July 1970 that Buchanan was once again deployed to the western Pacific and Southeast Asia. Once at Yankee Station, she returned to providing plane guard for Bon Homme Richard. During 9–19 August, the team joined anti-submarine warfare support aircraft carrier Shangri-La. Several months later (21 October–5 November), Buchanan again steamed with Shangri-La.

Between plane guard and escort duties, Buchanan provided NGFS for the US Army's Americal Division, 1st Brigade, 5th Infantry Division (Mechanized), and 1st Marine Division in the I Corps Tactical Zone (15 September–6 October). She shifted south to the IV Corps region, off the Mekong River delta, to provide gunnery support to the South Vietnamese 9th and 21st Divisions (19 November–1 December 1970). Buchanan's sailors didn't spend their entire deployment in the combat zone. They were given slight respites with several visits to Subic Bay, the longest being for upkeep (21 August–1 September, 1–10 October) before returning to combat duty. The crew also had the opportunity for rest and recreation at Hong Kong (13–18 October) and Singapore (9–19 November). On 4 December 1970, Buchanan set a course for her homeport from Subic Bay, making stops at Guam on 7 December, Midway on 12 December, and Pearl Harbor (14–15 December). She arrived at San Diego on 20 December 1970, giving her crew holiday leave and undergoing upkeep until 25 January 1971.

During 1971 Buchanan remained in the eastern Pacific. She operated with Midway, fleet ballistic missile submarine John C. Calhoun, and submarine Hawkbill (25 January–9 February), making a brief visit to Naval Station Treasure Island, California (26–28 January). She put in for an overhaul at San Francisco Naval Shipyard (22 April–3 September 1971). Buchanan returned to her homeport for sea trials (18–17 September), Refresher Training (18 October–9 December) and local operations for the rest of 1971.

==== 1972 combat ====
Buchanan departed for the western Pacific on 17 February 1972 with Kitty Hawk and Everett F. Larson. She returned to combat duty off Vietnam on 17 March 1972. On 30 March, the People's Army of Vietnam (PAVN) launched the Easter Offensive, sending invading forces to attack multiple locations in South Vietnam. In response, the U.S. initiated Operation Freedom Train, to strike targets in southern North Vietnam and the invading forces. On 1 April, Buchanan, in concert with guided missile destroyer Joseph Strauss provided gunnery support to cover the withdrawal of the South Vietnamese 57th Regiment from Firebase Gio Linh, near Ðông Hà. The position fell into the enemy hands where it remained for the duration of the war.

As the PAVN advanced, attention shifted to the defense of Ðông Hà on 2 April. On the ground, Captain John W. Ripley, USMC, an advisor with the 3rd Vietnam Marine Corps Battalion, coordinated NGFS along with 1st Lt. Joel Eisentein, USMC, commander of Air Naval Gunfire Liaison Company 1–2. The offshore task force provided one hour of sustained fire on two bridges being used by enemy troops to push back allied forces. In the heat of battle, Capt. Ripley sighted four enemy amphibious light tanks, Soviet-made PT-76, moving along the Cam Lo riverbank east of Ðông Hà. Ripley called in the coordinates to the task force. Buchanan and her compatriots quickly shifted their fire on to the new targets with great results. According to Ripley, "we could see them burning clearly. My counterparts, the marine battalion commander and the tank battalion commander, were both observing this superb display of naval gunfire. When the tanks were hit and burning, both were surprised and elated in seeing the potential of naval gunfire. I was to receive many requests for naval gunfire by the Vietnamese after this attack." Ripley sent a letter to the captain of the Buchanan, CDR William James Thearle, on 8 September 1972 describing the NGF support received during the operation.

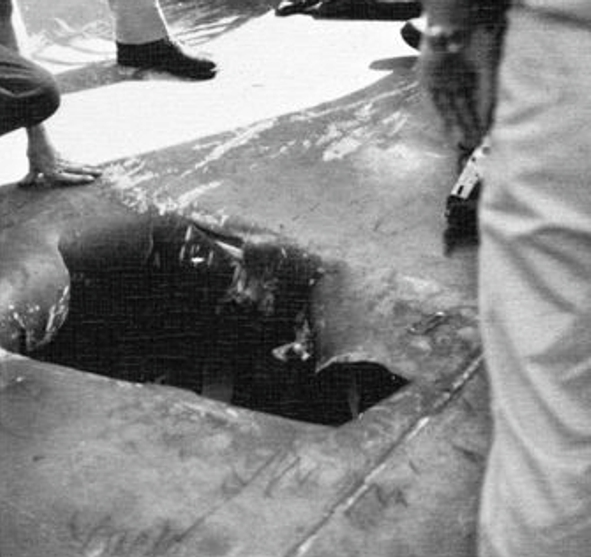
Shell damage aboard Buchanan, in April 1972

On 17 April 1972 Buchanan moved north to shell the vital bridges around the city of Vinh in North Vietnam, in company with George K. Mackenzie and Hamner. Around midday, George K. Mackenzie shifted her fire toward an observation tower she had spotted on the island Hon Mat. Shortly afterward, two enemy patrol boats, presumed to be Shanghai-class motorboats, appeared in the vicinity around Dao Bien Island. George K. Mackenzie fired on the approaching boats causing them to reverse course and retreat. Just over ten minutes later, Buchanan began taking fire from a shore battery. A shell airburst put a two and half foot hole in the destroyer. SN Leonard R. Davis was killed. Lt. Robert S Nemmers, Supply Corps, SA Vincent G. Guerrero, SD3 Primicitis V. Beltran, EM Frederick J. Shortreed Jr., GM3 Danny K. Hammond, and CS3 Frank S. Musiol were wounded. Shropshire's wound to one of his feet was severe enough for him to be transferred to guided missile cruiser Chicago for further treatment. The body of Seaman Davis was also transferred to Chicago. For her remaining time in Southeast Asia, Buchanan served as a picket ship and plane guard supporting the air strikes associated with Operation Linebacker (2 May–23 October 1972). On 29 August the destroyer put into Hong Kong (28 August–4 September) for some rest before beginning her long voyage home.

The Buchanan returned to her home port on 25 September 1972, where she conducted local operations until redeploying to Vietnam on 25 July 1973. In the Gulf of Tonkin, Buchanan provided escort services for Oriskany and served as an antiaircraft picket ship (13 September – 26 October 1973). She also made port calls to Kaohsiung, Taiwan (24 September – 1 October) and Mombasa, Kenya (22–26 December). Continuing her deployment in into 1974, Buchanan visited Singapore (7–11 January), Hong Kong (2–7 February), Kaohsiung (9–10 February), and Yokosuka (15–19 February). Bringing the deployment to a close, Buchanan got underway for San Diego on 22 February 1974. With heavy weather slowing her trip home, she did not arrive until 8 March. The ship remained in the eastern Pacific for the rest of the year making only two port calls to Santa Barbara, California (28 June – 1 July), for the Santa Barbara Sports Festival, and San Francisco (26–29 September), ending the year with holiday leave (14–31 December 1974).

=== 1975–1991 ===
The first six months of 1975, Buchanan moved to Long Beach Naval Shipyard for an overhaul. During this period, her 127 mm guns and ASROC launchers were removed along with her aging Mark X Identification Friend or Foe, SAMID, and other communications equipment. The latter were replaced with a new Mark III Advanced Information Management System and up-to-date communications gear. On 28 June 1975, Buchanan underwent sea trials, tests and training to ensure she was quickly back up to fighting condition. The destroyer and her crew went on holiday leave to close out the year (19–31 December 1975). On the first day of 1976, Buchanan moved back to Long Beach for some final touches to her overhaul then remained close to home conducting routine operations for the entirety of 1976.

On 11 April 1977 Buchanan once again set a course for the western Pacific with Constellation, and John S. McCain, along with frigates Brooke, Bagley, and Roark. After a brief stop at Pearl Harbor (19–20 April), she steamed with her companions for Subic Bay. While en route, Buchanan came alongside ammunition ship Shasta for replenishment. After the resupply began, Buchanan lost power in her aft engineering plant causing the ship to execute an emergency breakaway. A span wire between the vessels did not release so Shasta's deck crew cut it away. The trailing cable wound around the destroyer's port shaft damaging the rope guard. The shaft was locked and divers were deployed to remove the cable. Unable to free the shaft, she was rerouted to Naval Base Guam for repairs (3–15 May 1977).

Buchanan departed Guam on 16 May and was able to rejoin her task force in the South China Sea for "MAULEX 3–77", a joint American-Philippine amphibious exercise. Buchanan supplied simulated gunfire support for the insertion of reconnaissance teams. A few days later, she joined in a joint anti-submarine warfare exercise with the Republic of China Navy (30 May–3 June) and then posed as a Soviet missile cruiser during "MULTIPLEX 5–77" (18–25 June). That same month, the destroyer got to show off her Tartar missiles system by shooting down two drones, one of which she recorded as a direct hit (26–28 June). Buchanan took part in one last multinational exercise, "SEA SIAM VI" (19–21 July) before tying up at Subic Bay for maintenance and repairs (29 July–21 August 1977). After the long break, she threw lines and headed back to sea to make a port call to Hong Kong (24–28 August 1977). Returning to duty, Buchanan participated in exercises "MULTIPLEX 7–77" (26–29 September) and "ASWEX J1-78" (28 October–1 November). She also served as a screen ship for Constellation (6–26 September) and provided escort service in the East China Sea (30 September–2 October) and in the northern Sea of Japan (25–27 October). Despite her busy schedule, Buchanan was afforded some breaks to visit Kaohsiung (27–28 May), Pattaya Beach, Thailand (14–18 July), Fukuoka, Japan (3–6 October 1977). While in Fukuoka, the ship opened her decks to the public and members of the crew paid a goodwill visit to a local orphanage. After one last port call at Yokosuka (2–5 November), Buchanan steamed for home, arriving on 21 November and staying in port for the rest of 1977.

The following year was comparatively quiet for Buchanan as she spent nearly the entirety of 1978 operating along the California coast when not in port at San Diego. On 20 May her crew's dependents observed the destroyer in action while underway for a Family Cruise day. Venturing north, she made a brief port call to Seattle (27–29 May). In early November, Buchanan steamed out of American waters to visit Mazatlán, Mexico (3–5 November 1978). On her final day at the Mexican port town (5 November), an estimated 500 bales of cotton caught fire on the waterfront. Buchanan's sailors leapt into action and helped extinguish the blaze. The local U.S. Consul and Defense Attaché Office in Mexico City commended the crew for their service to the local community. Buchanan returned to the U.S. to end the year with holiday leave (16–31 December 1978).

On 20 February 1979 Buchanan was underway once again for the western Pacific. While en route to Pearl Harbor (2–4 March), a companion guided missile frigate Brooke, suffered a failure to her main steam condenser. Buchanan came to the aid of the disabled frigate by towing her for two-and-a-half days while she was repaired. After a stop at Pearl Harbor, Buchanan and her companions moved to Guam (19–28 March). On 29 March, she was underway to serve as an observer for the test launch of three UGM-27 Polaris submarine-launched ballistic missiles. Over the next several months, Buchanan participated in multiple exercises off the Korean Peninsula (7–10 May), Okinawa (16–23 July) and in the Tasman Sea (18–23 August 1979). She also made several port visits putting into Hong Kong (19–24 May), Chinae (5–6 June) and Busan, South Korea (10–15 June), before mooring at Yokosuka for upkeep and maintenance ( 18 June–5 July 1979). In early August, Buchanan opened her decks to the public while at Port Ville, New Hebrides, Vanuatu (6–9 August). In three days the destroyer received of over 500 visitors. Afterward she stopped at Auckland, New Zealand (13–17 August) before tying up at Pago Pago, American Samoa, on 28 August. The following day, Buchanan was underway for Pearl Harbor (28 August–3 September) where she embarked family members for a Tiger Cruise back to San Diego (3–9 September 1979). On 8 November, she began the first phase of an overhaul at San Diego.

To continue her overhaul, Buchanan moved to Long Beach on 1 January 1980. During this period (1 January–26 November), the destroyers guns and missile launchers were reworked. Harpoon anti-ship missile and Super Rapid Offboard Countermeasures (SRBOC) systems were installed. The addition of SRBOC to Buchanan provided her with state-of-the-art chaff and infrared countermeasures for defense against missile attacks. Following her overhaul, she remained in local waters conducting routine operations, training, and sea trials. On 19 September 1981, the destroyer set a course for the western Pacific with supply ship Mars, ammunition ship Haleakala, frigate Harold E. Holt and destroyer O'Brien. The formation arrived at Subic Bay on 17 October 1981. Buchanan took part in training operations in the Sea of Siam (3–6 November), Sea of Japan (9–22 December) and gunnery exercises at Tabones Island, Philippines (16–19 November). In between duty, she visited Sattahip (2 November) and Pattaya, Thailand (7–10 November). When she was in port at Pusan (5–8 December), sailors from Buchanan and Holt delivered food and clothing to a local orphanage as part of Operation Handclasp. Buchanan also visited Sasebo (15–19 and 22–26 December) before mooring at Hong Kong to celebrate the New Year on 31 December 1981.

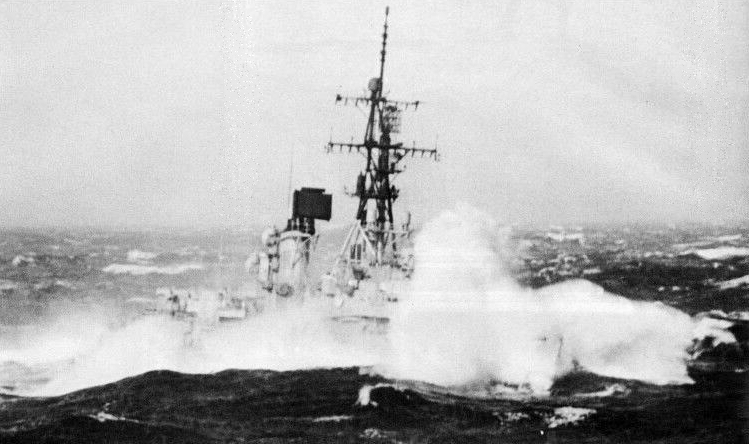
Buchanan in the North Pacific in 1983

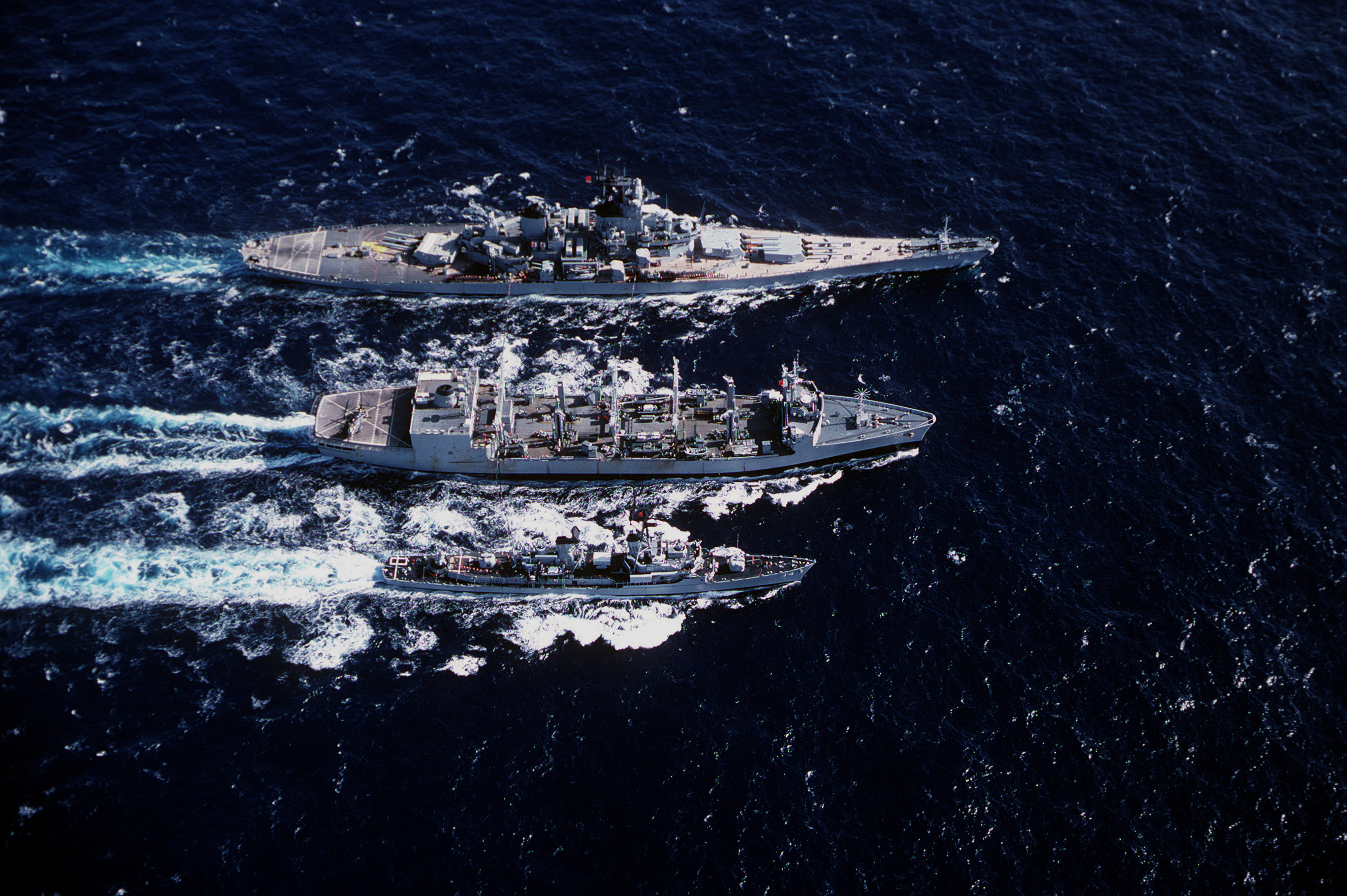
Kansas City replenishes New Jersey and Buchanan in the Pacific Ocean on 12 August 1983

Buchanan began 1982 with gunnery training at Tabones Island on 11 January. She put into Singapore for a brief rest (20–24 January) before returning to sea for more exercises until 11 March when she steamed toward home. Buchanan arrived at San Diego on 23 March 1982. She returned to Asia again on 2 April 1983 where she operated in the China and Philippine seas (2 April–31 July). On 1 August she was underway with battleship New Jersey for Pearl Harbor. From Hawaii, the destroyer and her mighty companion steamed to Rodman Naval Station, Panama (17 August–1 September 1983). Buchanan provided escort services to U.S. Army landing craft underway to Honduras (2–8 September). Wrapping up her deployment, she made her way home to San Diego (9–17 September) where she immediately entered a period of upkeep and giving her crew leave to be with their families. After only a few periods at sea, Buchanan was placed on restricted availability for the rest of the year on 23 November 1983.

After spending the first five months of 1984 operating out of San Diego, Buchanan moved to Hawaiian waters to take part in Rim of the Pacific (RIMPAC) '84, anti-submarine warfare exercises and missile tests. (30 May–15 August). She returned to San Diego and began preparing for deployment on 18 October. In December, Buchanan was steaming in the Sea of Japan. She put into Hong Kong (5–7 December) and spent the holidays at Subic Bay (18 December 1984 – 12 January 1985). In February Buchanan found herself in the middle of a diplomatic confrontation between New Zealand and the United States.

==== 1985 dispute with New Zealand ====
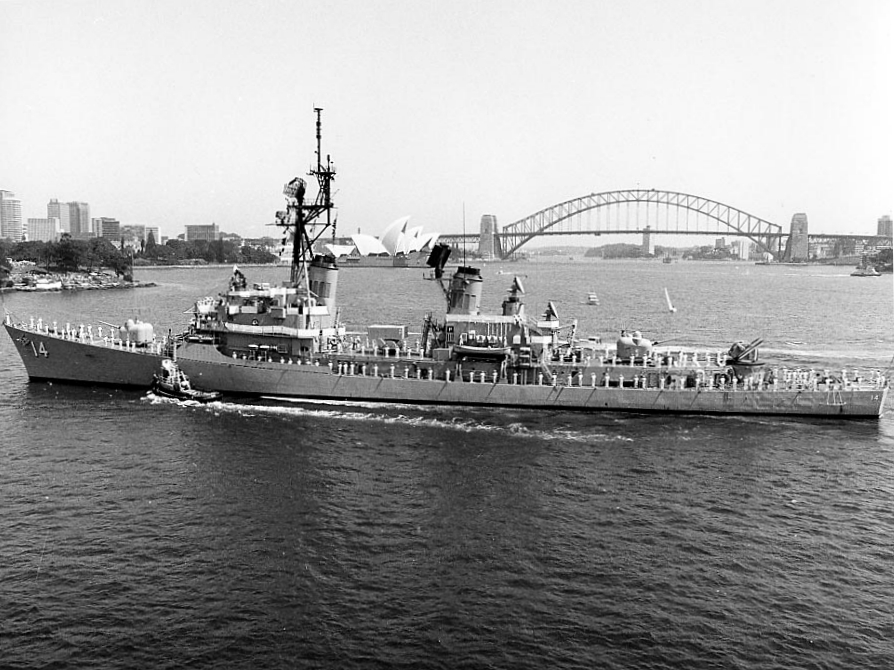
Buchanan visiting Sydney in 1985

In February, 1985 a port visit request by the United States for Buchanan was refused by New Zealand, as Buchanan was capable of launching nuclear depth bomb-equipped ASROCs. Following the victory of the New Zealand Labour Party led by David Lange at elections in 1984, the Parliament of New Zealand enacted a law which barred nuclear-powered or nuclear-armed ships from using New Zealand ports, citing the dangers of nuclear weapons and continued nuclear testing in the South Pacific. Given that the United States Navy refused to confirm or deny the presence of nuclear weapons aboard ships, these laws in effect refused access to New Zealand ports for all ships of the United States Navy.

After consultations with Australia and after negotiations with New Zealand broke down, the United States announced that it was suspending its ANZUS treaty obligations to New Zealand until United States Navy ships were readmitted to New Zealand ports, citing that New Zealand was "a friend, but not an ally".

Despite these troubles, Buchanan continued her busy schedule unabated. She participated in multiple regional exercises in the South China Sea and the Sea of Siam (21 January–26 April 1985). While departing Sydney, she was once again involved in an anti-nuclear controversy. As Buchanan was steaming out of the port in a column formation with 13 other vessels, an ultralight aircraft dove on her to drop a "paint bomb." The pilot missed the target and was later taken into custody by Australian authorities. Buchanan rounded out her deployment with port calls to Brisbane, Australia (14–17 March), Rabaul, Papua New Guinea, on 22 March, Subic Bay (2–21 April), and Manila, Philippines (27–28). She returned to Subic Bay on 30 April for upkeep before departing for Pearl Harbor on 12 May. Buchanan arrived at San Diego on 25 May and conducted local operations until shifting to Long Beach to begin another overhaul on 5 August 1985.

With her overhaul completed on 17 June, Buchanan was put through her paces in the eastern Pacific for all of 1986. During 18 June–31 July, she underwent several inspections and took part in training exercises. On 26 July, the destroyer tested her weapons at the Nanoose Range, British Columbia. Buchanan was allowed a few breaks while away from her homeport during visits at the Canadian cities Vancouver (16–20 July) and Esquimalt on 30 July. In between these visits, she stopped at Bangor, Washington (26–28 July) for upkeep before steaming back to San Diego on 31 July 1986, where she remained for the rest of the year.

While Buchanan lay at San Diego (1 January–13 July 1987) she celebrated her 25th birthday on 6 February. During this time she also prepared to be deployed the western Pacific once again but this time with a different destination. Instead of her usual stomping grounds, the destroyer was headed to the Arabian Sea. As the Iran–Iraq War raged on, Iran had become a threat to Kuwaiti oil tankers in the Persian Gulf and the Strait of Hormuz. In response to threat, the U.S. executed Operation Earnest Will to provide protection to the tankers and ensure that commercial shipping lanes remained open. Buchanan departed San Diego on 14 July 1987 as a member of Battle Force Echo with Ranger. The battle force put into Subic Bay (10–12 August) and Singapore (16–19 August) before arriving on station in the North Arabian Sea on 25 August. During her time in the region, Buchanan visited Diego Garcia, British Indian Ocean Territory (8–16 September), Mogadishu, Somalia (20–21 October) and Victoria, Seychelles (25–29 October 1987). On 14 November, the destroyer began work her way back to the eastern Pacific stopping at Phuket, Thailand (18–23 November), Penang, Malaysia (24–26 November), Hong Kong (2–6 December), and Subic Bay (9–11 December). She arrived in San Diego just in time to celebrate the New Year on 30 December 1987.

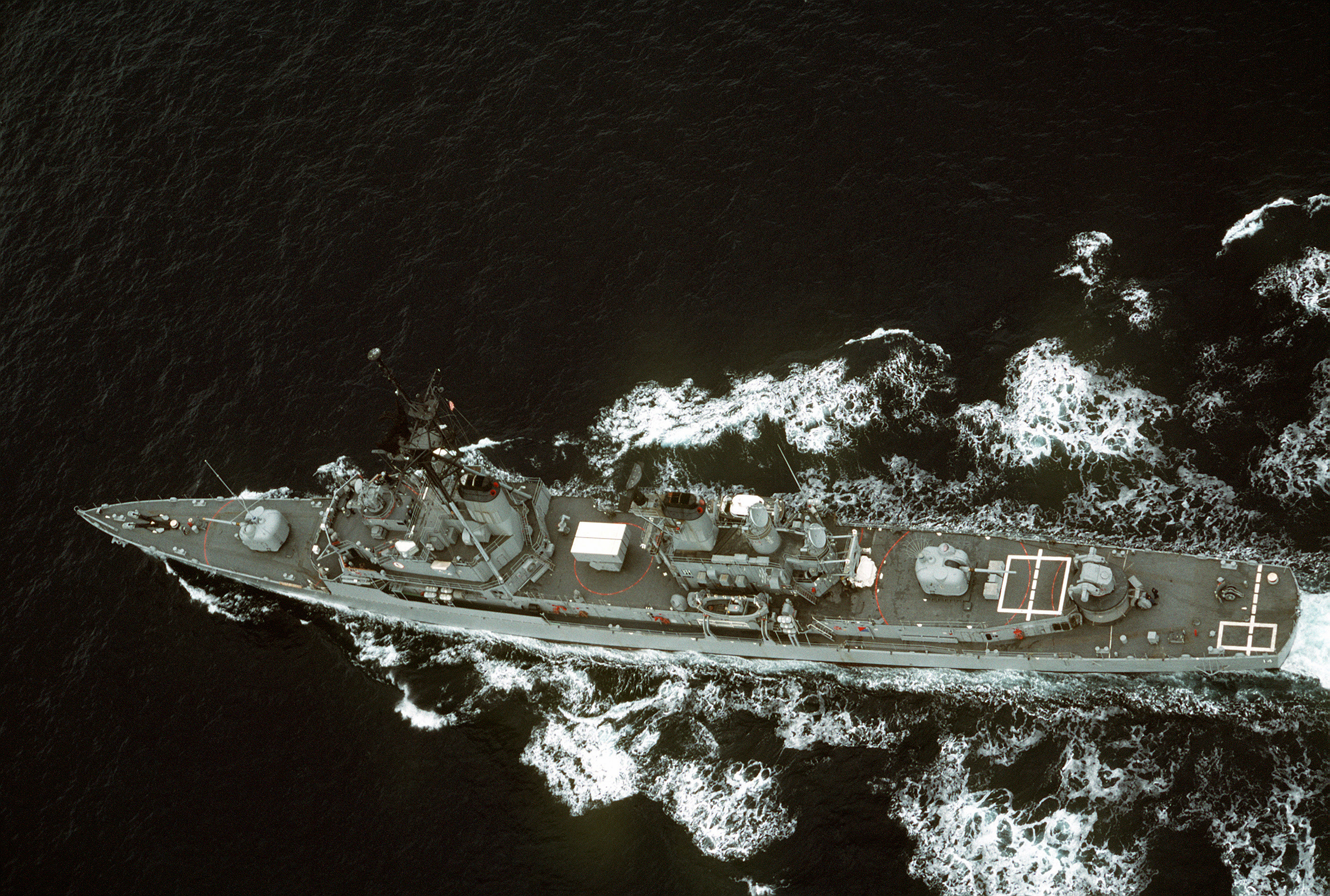
Overhead view of Buchanan underway in the Pacific Ocean, in 1990

After spending the next 13 months in the eastern Pacific and the Southern California Operations area (1 January 1988 – 24 February 1989), Buchanan departed for what would be her last deployment to the western Pacific. She returned to the North Arabian Sea to rejoin Earnest Will on 3 June 1989. Buchanan spent only few days in the area, departing on 14 June to return home. By 24 August 1989, she was back at San Diego. Buchanan spent the rest of the year operating off the Californian coast and took part in Fleet Week at San Francisco on 7–11 October. With her career winding down, the destroyer remained in the eastern Pacific. On 26 February, she was at the Nanoose Range for Project 371 torpedo test (26 February–1 and 7–8 March). During the spring and summer of 1990, Buchanan took part in drug interdiction patrols along the U.S. western seaboard. She put into Tacoma, Washington, for the 75th Annual Daffodil Festival (6–10 April) and represented the national "Just Say No To Drugs" campaign at Portland, Oregon (11–13 May 1990).

While back in her homeport, Buchanan hosted HMS Ariadne (F72), when the British frigate visited San Diego (29 May–4 June). On 4 August, she got underway for a dependents cruise with Ranger to exhibit operations after which she remained in port for the rest of 1990. Buchanan never returned to sea under her own power. From 1 January until 1 October 1991, she served as a training ship for SEAL Team One and SEAL Team Five to practice boarding operations while she underwent preparations to be decommissioned. On 1 October, Buchanan was decommissioned alongside Lynde McCormick and Robison. She was towed to Hawaii on 15 October and was stricken from the Naval Vessel Register on 20 November 1992.

=== Decommissioning and fate ===
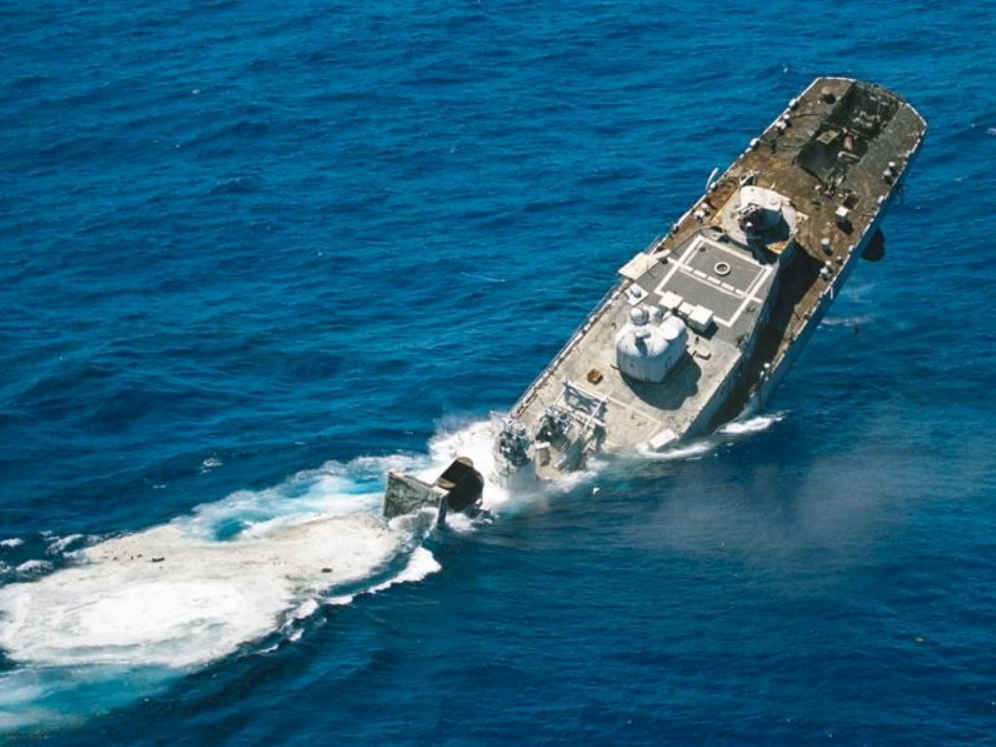
USS Buchanan sinking in the Pacific Ocean off Hawaii on 14 June 2000

Buchanan was decommissioned on 1 October 1991 and stricken from the Naval Vessel Register on 20 November 1992. On 13 June 2000 she was allocated to be sunk as a target during RIMPAC 2000 as part of Operation SINKEX. She remained afloat after being hit by three AGM-114 Hellfire air-to-surface missiles, three Harpoon anti-ship missiles, and a 2,400-pound (1,100 kg) laser-guided bomb in the Pacific Ocean off Hawaii. She finally was scuttled on 14 June 2000 by the detonation of 200 pounds (91 kg) of explosives that had been placed aboard her. She lay 64 miles (103 km; 56 nmi) off Hawaii in a depth of 2,540 fathoms (4,650 m; 15,240 ft).

== See also ==
- New Zealand-United States relations
