= USNS Rainier (T-AOE-7) =

Supply-class fast combat support ship

Coordinates: 47.5526856°N 122.6536139°W

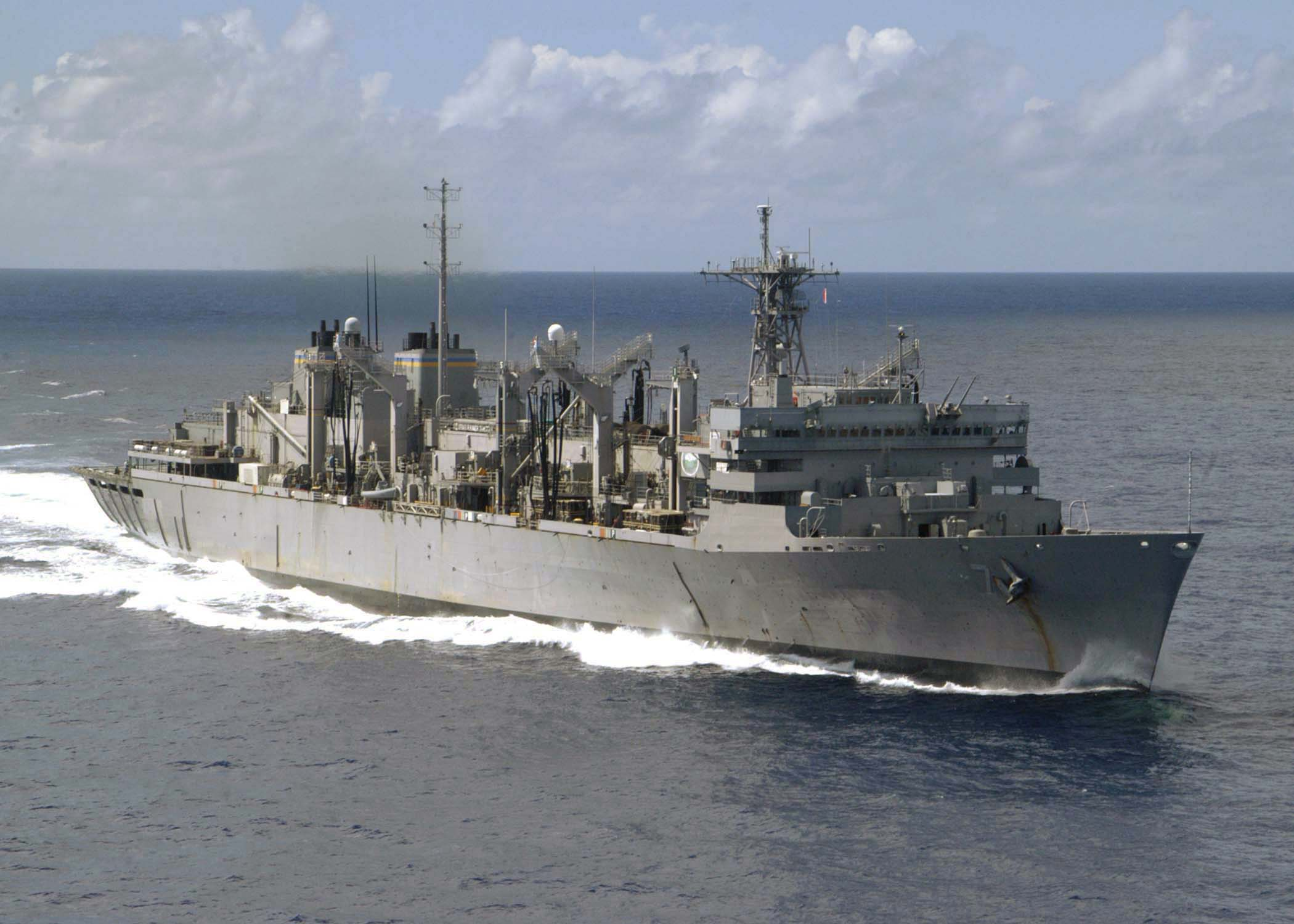
- USNS Rainier in 2004

History

United States
- Name: USNS Rainier (T-AOE-7)
- Namesake: Mount Rainier
- Operator: Military Sealift Command
- Ordered: 3 November 1988
- Builder: National Steel and Shipbuilding Company San Diego, California
- Laid down: 31 May 1990
- Launched: 28 September 1991
- Commissioned: 21 January 1995
- Decommissioned: 28 August 2003
- In service: 29 August 2003
- Out of service: 1 October 2016
- Stricken: 15 September 2022
- Identification: Callsign: NAOE
- Motto: The Legend Of Service
- Status: Stricken

General characteristics
- Class & type: Supply class
- Displacement: 48,800 long tons (49,600 t)
- Length: 754.6 ft (230.0 m)
- Beam: 107 ft (33 m)
- Draught: 39 ft (12 m)
- Installed power: 105,000 hp (78 MW)
- Propulsion: four General Electric LM 2500 gas turbine engines, Two Propellers
- Speed: 26 knots (48 km/h; 30 mph)
- Complement: 176 civilians, 30 military
- Aircraft carried: Two CH-46E Sea Knight or MH-60S Seahawk helicopters

USNS Rainier (T-AOE-7), is a Supply-class fast combat support ship and the third US Navy vessel named after Mount Rainier. The ship was christened on 28 September 1991 by the ship's sponsor, Mrs. Suzanne Callison Dicks, wife of Congressman Norm Dicks, and commissioned as "USS Rainier (AOE-7)", on 21 January 1995 at Bremerton, Washington.

Rainier has the speed to keep up with the Navy's carrier strike groups (CSG) and rapidly replenish Navy task forces. She receives petroleum products, ammunition and stores from shuttle ships or during port calls and redistributes these items simultaneously to CSG ships. This reduces the vulnerability of serviced ships by reducing alongside time.

In April 2013, it was announced that the Military Sealift Command will take Rainier and her sister USNS Bridge (T-AOE-10) out of service in 2014 as a cost-saving measure.

The fast combat support ship Rainier, which was last part of the Navy's civilian-crewed Military Sealift Command's fleet of combat logistics ships and being held in reserve in Bremerton, Washington since 1 October 2016. On 15 September 2022, she was stricken from the Naval Vessel Register.

== Coat of arms ==
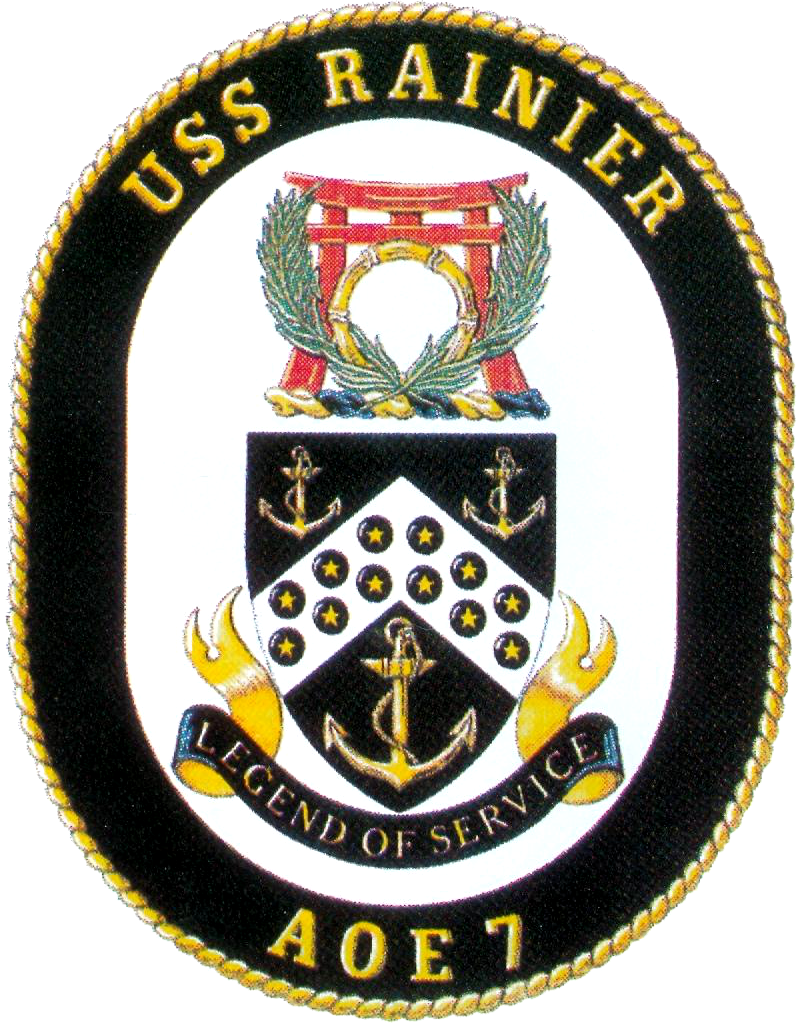

=== Shield ===
Dark blue and gold are the colors traditionally associated with the Navy. Gold is indicative of honor, excellence, and achievement. The dark blue of the shield stands for loyalty and reflects the sea, the theater of naval operations. White suggests integrity and purity of ideals. Black implies solidity. The chevron, a symbol of strength and support, alludes to the prow of the ship and the peak of Mt. Rainier, the ship's namesake. The black pellets characterize fuel and ammunition pointing to the ship's mission. The pellets are charged with twelve battle stars earned for World War II service in Korea and Vietnam. The three anchors, symbolic of maritime tradition, simulate the past and present ships.

=== Crest ===
Red symbolizes combat, valor, and zeal. The colors red, yellow and green are the colors associated with Vietnam. The Torii gate recalls service in Korea. The bamboo annulet signifies continuous replenishment operations conducted off Vietnam. The crossed palm fronds represent the ship's extensive service in the South Pacific and portray strength, support, honor, and achievement.

=== Motto ===
A scroll azure doubled and inscribed "LEGEND OF SERVICE" in gold.

== Construction ==
Contract design was completed in February 1986 and steel fabrication work for Rainier began on August 16, 1986 at National Steel and Shipbuilding (NASSCO) in San Diego, California. The official keel laying was conducted on May 31, 1990.

NASSCO built Rainier utilizing an efficient modular construction technique - separate sections of the ship were built with piping sections, ventilation ducting and shipboard hardware, as well as major machinery items such as main propulsion equipment, generators and electrical panels installed.

These pre-outfitted sections were then brought together to form a complete hull. As a result of this construction technique Rainier was nearly 50 percent complete when launched on September 28, 1991.

The next three years were spent completing the electrical wiring, plumbing systems, ventilation systems, and equipment and hardware installation.

As built, Rainier included the following (Self Defense) Weapon Systems:

- NATO Sea Sparrow Missile Launching System
- Phalanx Close-In-Weapons-System (CIWS)
- 25mm guns (x2)
- .50 Caliber Machine Guns (x4)
- Countermeasures Set - AN/SLQ-32(V)3 (One of only four built by the Hughes Aircraft Company.)
- Decoy Launchers (x2). Rainier only had 2 Decoy Launchers (Forward), the rest of the ships in her class had 4 (Forward and Aft).
- Torpedo Countermeasures Transmitting Set - AN/SLQ-25 Nixie

As built, Rainier's hull arrangements provided berthing, living, messing, recreation and office spaces for 40 Officers, 36 Chief Petty Officer's and 591 enlisted personnel. Additional features included leisure and community facilities, medical and dental spaces, barber shop, ship's store, smoke pit, laundry and dry cleaning facilities, workshops, laboratories and test areas.

== Operational history ==
During the month of May, 1996, Rainier conducted several ammunition onloads, fueling at sea (FAS) and CONSOL's before arriving in the Hawaiian Operating Area.

Throughout June 1996, Rainier participated in Rim of the Pacific (RIMPAC-96) exercise where numerous FAS, Vertical Replenishments (VERTREP) and CONSOL's were conducted with US, Australian, Canadian and Japanese ships.

During the first half of August, Rainier participated in a Joint Task Force Exercise (JTFX-96) - operating in the Southern California Operating Area (SOCAL OPAREA). During the last half of August and well into September, Rainier was in port at Puget Sound Naval Station for upkeep.

=== Maiden deployment ===
Rainier's maiden deployment began when she departed Indian Island, Washington on October 11, 1996, en route to Hong Kong via the SOCAL OPAREA.

For the month of November, Rainier anchored in Hong Kong, providing hotel services to USS Santa Fe (SSN 763) and participated in a relief project: "Helping Hands Home for the Elderly." Rainier anchored in Singapore, participating in a relief project: "Christian School for the Mentally Handicapped." Towards the end of November, fuel was onloaded in Fujairah, United Arab Emirates (UAE). Rainier conducted several FAS's with US, United Kingdom and New Zealand ships before a brief in port period at Muscat, Oman - where Rainier provided hotel services for USS Stump (DD-978).

The month of December found Rainier transit ing the Strait of Hormuz; anchoring at Bahrain; conducting FAS and CONSOL's; loading fuel at Jebel Ali, UAE; transiting the Strait of Hormuz; conducting FAS's; and on Christmas, loading fuel in Fujairah; re-transiting the Strait of Hormuz to conduct FAS's; and, anchoring on New Year's Eve with the SAG.

During the month of January 1996, Rainier fell into a routine of loading fuel in Jebel Ali, conducting numerous FAS, Replenishment at Sea (RAS), VERTREP, and CONSOL's. The month ended with Rainier anchoring in Bahrain.

February, Rainier transited through the Strait of Hormuz twice to onload fuel and conduct RAS and VERTREPs. During this period, Rainier anchored in Bahrain, was inport Jebel Ali and retransited the Strait of Hormuz for the last time during this deployment.

March, Rainier was in port briefly in Diego Garcia before spending a week in Melbourne, Australia. Several RAS's were conducted en route to Pearl Harbor, Hawaii.

The beginning of April consisted of embarking "Tigers" and conducting ammunition downloads to USS Flint (AE-32) and USS Shasta (AE-33). Rainier returned to Bremerton, Washington on April 11, 1997 to complete WESTPAC 96-97.

After a month of reduced operations to let the crew recover, the training cycle to prepare for the November 1998 deployment. This training cycle included the Rim of the Pacific (RIMPAC-98) exercise conducted with over thirteen countries.

=== Second deployment ===
Rainier's second deployment began in November 1998. After 28 consecutive days underway, Rainier pulled into Singapore, her first liberty port. Rainier sailors participated in a community relations project, "Project Handclasp", at Singapore's Gracehaven Children's Home.

Rainier's second port of call was anchoring off the beach of the resort city of Patong, Thailand.

After transiting the Strait of Hormuz, Rainier arrived in Jebel Ali to onload fuel. Rainier was informed that she had won her third Battle Efficiency Award. A majority of Rainier's operational time was conducting FAS, RAS, VERTREP and CONSOL's while in the Persian Gulf.

After departing the Persian Gulf, Rainier made port calls to Bali and Darwin, Australia.

=== Third deployment ===
Rainier's third deployment began in March 2001. Rainier anchored off the coast of Melbourne, Australia in early April for her first liberty port.

Rainier's second port of call was anchoring off the beach of Freemantle Australia in mid-April.

While in the Persian Gulf, Rainier made several port visits to Jebel Ali, U.A.E. to onload fuel and Bahrain for liberty and re-supply.

After departing the Persian Gulf, Rainier made port calls to Phuket, Thailand and Hong Kong.

Rainier returned from back to Bremerton, WA on September 10, 2001, the day before the tragic 9/11 terrorist attacks. Post-deployment leave was cancelled for the crew and the ship remained in a high readiness state; however, the ship did not respond to the attacks due to an upcoming maintenance period.

=== Final deployment ===
Rainier's fourth and final deployment as a USS ship began in early November 2002, making only one extended port call in Hong Kong prior to entering the Persian Gulf. The second port call to Singapore was cancelled due to fear by the local authorities of having a refueling ship in its ports and her being a potential target for a terrorist attack.

Rainier was one of the busiest ships in the Persian Gulf, providing fuel, food and ammunition to U.S. and coalition ships. During seven months at sea, Rainier completed a record 244 underway replenishments with 64 different ships.

After being extended for an additional month in the Persian Gulf due to Operation Iraqi Freedom, Rainier transited out of the Gulf and made port calls in Guam, Fremantle, Australia and Maui, Hawaii. The crew also started to hand over systems and train members of the Military Sealift Command crew riding on board for the transit back to Naval Station Bremerton. Rainier returned from her final deployment on June 2, 2003.

== Transfer to Military Sealift Command ==
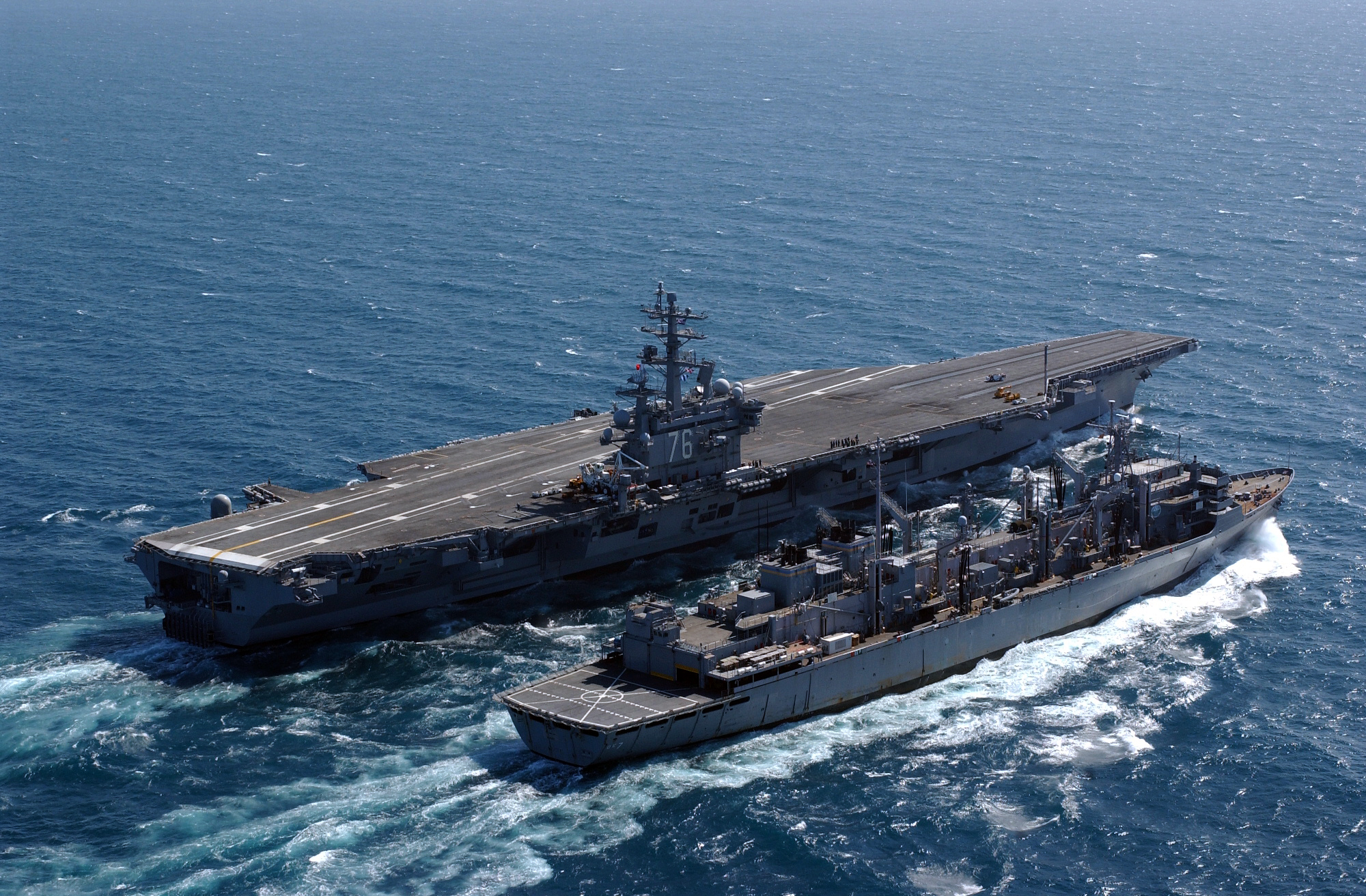
Rainier replenishing USS Ronald Reagan, 2005

After service in the United States Navy from 1995 through 2003 as USS Rainier (AOE-7), she was decommissioned and her weapons systems were removed, then she was transferred on August 29, 2003 to the Military Sealift Command, which designated her USNS Rainier (T-AOE-7). During Operation Unified Assistance, the international relief effort following the 2004 Indian Ocean earthquake and tsunami, Rainier provided underway replenishment support to 32 American, British, and Australian warships involved in this operation.

Like other fast combat support ships, she was part of MSC's Naval Fleet Auxiliary Force.

USNS Rainier's cargo capacities:

- Diesel Fuel Marine (DFM): 1,965,600 US gallons (7,440 m³)
- JP-5 fuel: 2,620,800 US gallons (9,920 m³)
- Bottled gas: 800 bottles
- Ordnance stowage: 1,800 tons
- Chill and freeze stowage: 400 tons
- Water: 20,000 US gallons (76 m³)

USNS Rainier's refueling rigs can pump fuel at a rate of 3,000 US gallons per minute (200 L/s).

== Sources ==
- USS Rainier (AOE-7) Commissioning Day Booklet
- USS Rainier (AOE-7) WESTPAC 96-97 Cruise Book
- USS Rainier (AOE-7) "Legend of Service" 1998-1999 Cruise Book
