= Carol M. Pottenger =

United States Navy vice admiral

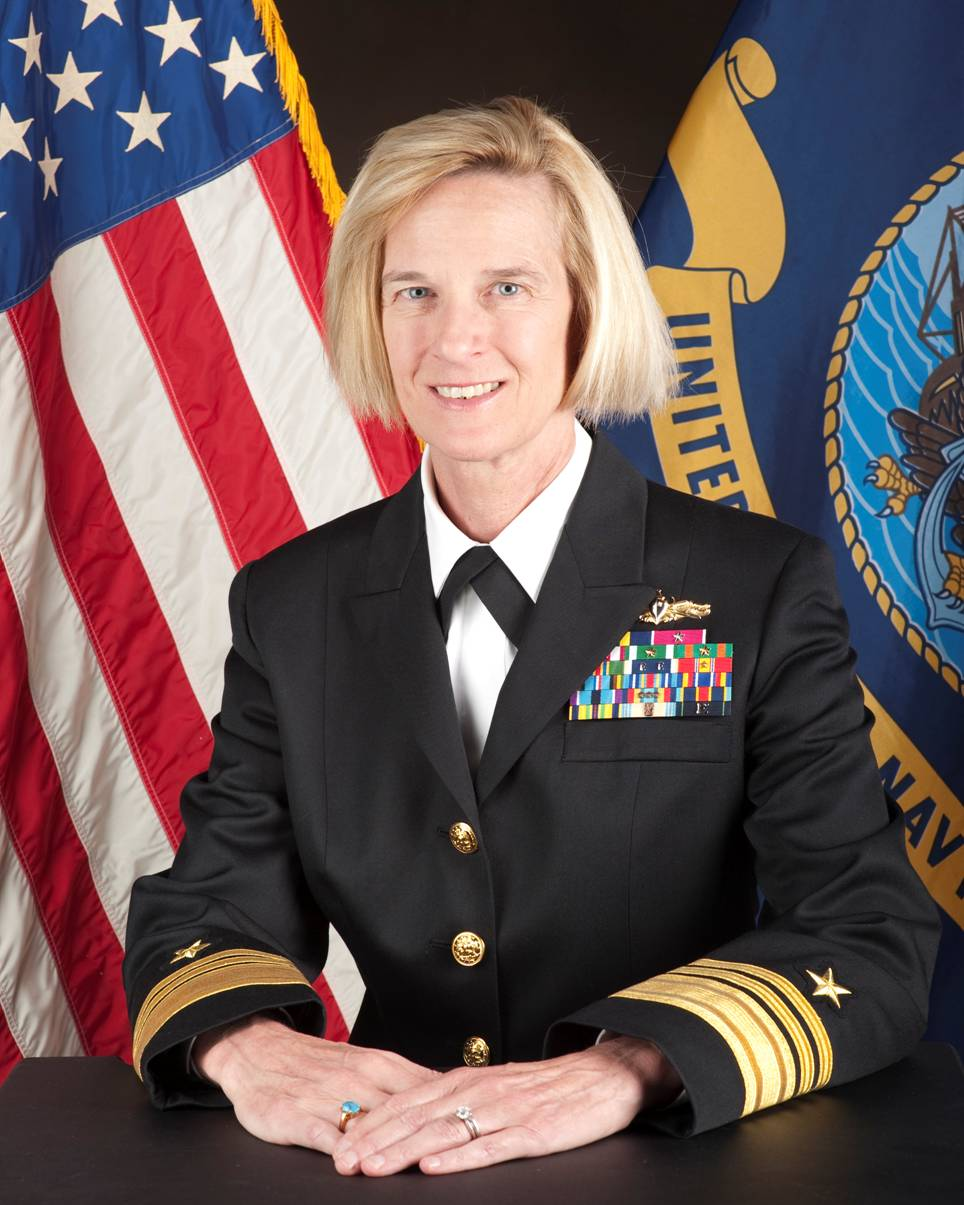
- Pottenger in 2010
- Born: Chicago, Illinois
- Military career
- Allegiance: United States
- Branch: United States Navy
- Service years: 1977–2013
- Rank: Vice admiral
- Commands: Navy Expeditionary Combat Command; Amphibious Force 7th Fleet/Expeditionary Strike Group Seven; Military Sealift Fleet Support Command; USS Bridge (AOE-10); USS Shasta (AE-33)
- Conflicts: Operation Enduring Freedom
- Awards: Defense Distinguished Service Medal; Navy Distinguished Service Medal; Legion of Merit (6); Meritorious Service Medal (3); Order of St. George (Bulgaria)

Carol M. Pottenger is a retired United States Navy flag officer. She was among the first women to be assigned to serve at sea in 1978, the first female admiral to command a major combat organization, Amphibious Force 7th Fleet/Expeditionary Strike Group Seven, encompassing the amphibious forces assigned to the western Pacific; and the first female admiral to lead a combatant force "type command", Navy Expeditionary Combat Command, charged with the manning, training and equipping of over 40,000 expeditionary sailors in preparation for combat deployments to Iraq and Afghanistan, as well as global security assistance operations. Her final naval post was with NATO as deputy chief of staff for capability and development at Supreme Allied Commander Transformation, Norfolk, Virginia, the first female officer to hold this position.

Pottenger, who retired from the navy in 2013, works as a consultant and serves on various public, private and non-profit boards.

== Early life and education ==
Pottenger was born in Chicago, Illinois, and grew up in Saint Petersburg, Florida. She attended Purdue University, where she participated in the Naval Reserve Officer Training Corps program, and graduated with a Bachelor of Arts degree in history in 1977 and received her commission as an ensign in the United States Navy. During her career, Pottenger has participated in executive development programs at the University of North Carolina at Chapel Hill, National Defense University, and the Naval Postgraduate School. In honor of her career of distinguished accomplishments, Purdue University awarded her a Doctor of Philosophy in social sciences (honoris causa) in 2007.

== Naval career ==
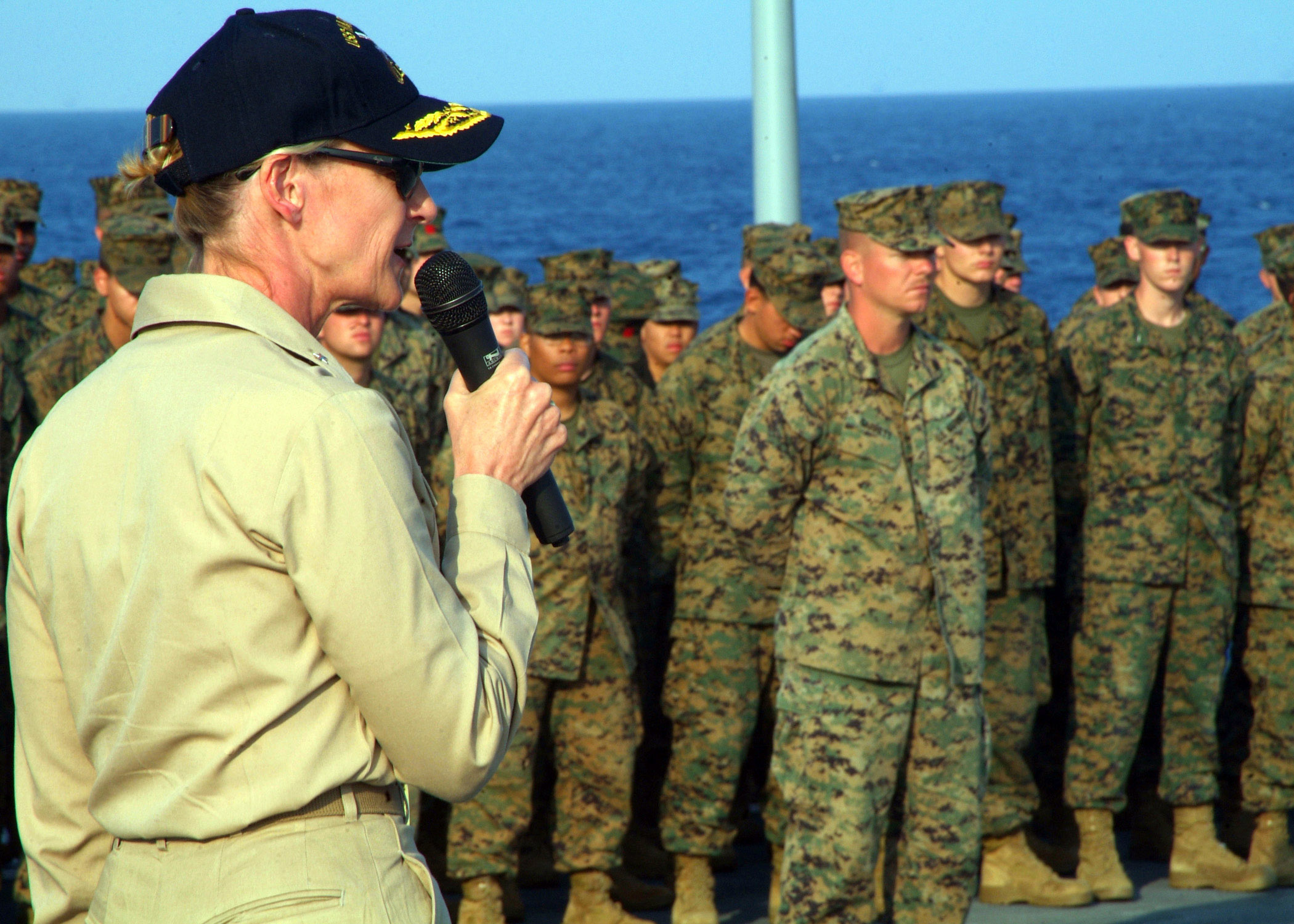
Pottenger in March 2007, speaking to a group of United States Marines aboard USS Harpers Ferry (LSD-49).

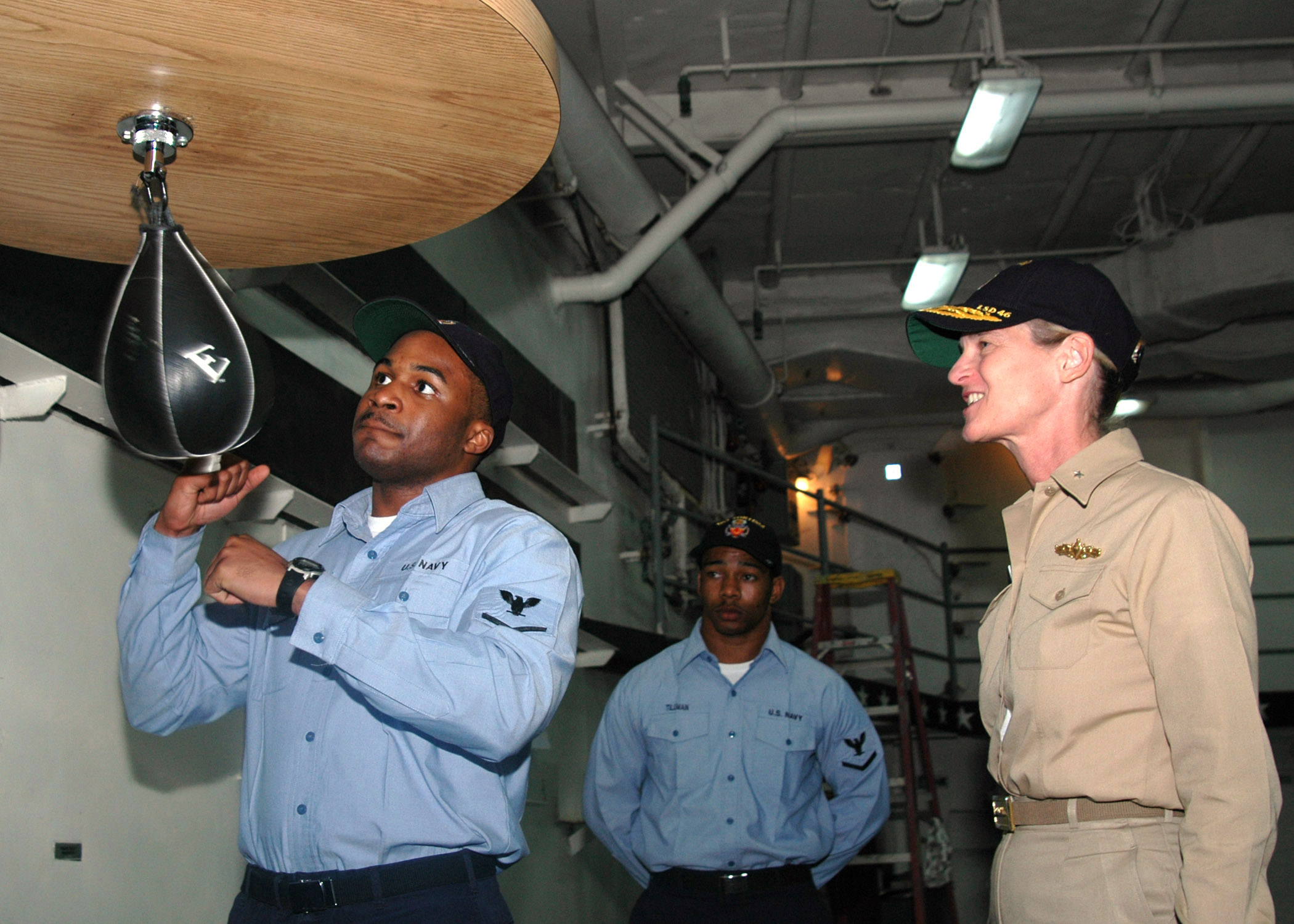
Pottenger in April 2007, watching a sailor hit a punching bag aboard a naval ship.

Following her commissioning in 1977, Pottenger was one of the first women selected for sea duty. Pottenger reported aboard USS Yosemite as engineering division officer and completed a Mediterranean deployment. Following her first shore duty tour, she transitioned to the Naval Reserve as a full-time active duty officer in the Training and Administration of the Reserve program, now known as the Full-Time Support program.

Subsequent sea tours included assignment as operations officer aboard USS Yellowstone (AD-41) and executive officer aboard USS Kiska (AE-35). Pottenger assumed command of USS Shasta (AE-33) in 1996, completing several deployments to the western Pacific, Arabian Sea, and the Persian Gulf in support of the United States Fifth Fleet and United States Seventh Fleet commanders. She took command of USS Bridge (AOE-10) in 2001, and during an extended deployment in support of Operation Enduring Freedom, provided at-sea logistics support to ten aircraft carrier battle groups, amphibious groups and dozens of coalition ships. As a result of her inspired leadership, USS Bridge was awarded the Battle E and the 2002 Arleigh Burke Fleet Trophy.

Ashore, Pottenger has been assigned to commander, Service Group 2 as staff communications officer; the United States Naval Academy as the 25th company officer; and commanding officer of two Navy Operational Support Centers in Mare Island and San Diego, California. She also served as the Naval Surface Reserve Force deputy chief of staff for manpower, where she institutionalized manpower and personnel best practices across a force of 65,000 Reservists.

During her tours in the Pentagon, Pottenger served as executive assistant for director, Surface Warfare (OPNAV N86); executive assistant to deputy chief of naval operations (Resources, Requirements & Assessments) (OPNAV N8); and executive assistant to vice chief of naval operations.

Following her selection to flag rank, she was assigned as the deputy chief of Navy Reserve. In this role, she served as the primary advisor to the commander of a force encompassing over 80,000 Sailors and executing an annual appropriation exceeding $1 billion.

In November 2005, Pottenger was assigned to the Military Sealift Command. There she established a new Navy command, Military Sealift Fleet Support Command and served as the type commander for over 40 combat logistics and special mission ships that supported naval, joint, and coalition forces on a global scale. As commander, Pottenger provided executive leadership, management, and control of $2 billion in annual funding and over 5400 highly trained, cross-functional personnel, comprising a mix of civilian mariners, professional engineers, and human resources and training staff.

In November 2006, Pottenger became the first female admiral to command a strike group when she assumed command of Amphibious Force 7th Fleet/Expeditionary Strike Group Seven at White Beach, Okinawa, aboard USS Harpers Ferry. Pottenger led, prepared, and deployed amphibious and expeditionary naval forces consisting of eight ships and over 6000 Sailors through over 80 distinct, strategic engagements across the western Pacific area of operations in support of the United States Seventh Fleet commander. Additionally, Pottenger served as a formal spokesperson and diplomatic representative during United States efforts to provide humanitarian assistance and disaster relief in several Asian countries.

In September 2008, Pottenger became the third commander of Navy Expeditionary Combat Command, charged with the mission of preparing and deploying expeditionary forces to conduct combat and security assistance missions to all military theaters globally. Pottenger served as the enterprise director for the Navy's expeditionary forces consisting of 40,000 Sailors in eight distinct warfare disciplines: logistics, explosive ordnance disposal, diving and salvage, maritime security, riverine, maritime civil affairs, expeditionary training, and intelligence. Pottenger provided full P&L accountability of $3 billion in annual expenditures, while ensuring visibility, standardization, procurement efficiency, maintenance management, and continuous force modernization.

From 2010 to 2013, Pottenger was deputy chief of staff for capability and development at NATO Headquarters, Supreme Allied Commander Transformation, Norfolk, Virginia. She facilitated efforts to guide, influence and support NATO and its 28 allied nations and partners in military capability transformation. She led a diverse international staff of 300, spanning North America and Europe, serving as a catalyst in NATO planning, while administering a $40 million enterprise funding budget.

== Awards and decorations ==
In March 2013, Pottenger was awarded the Order of St. George by the Bulgarian Minister of Defense in recognition of her exceptional service to NATO. Her United States military awards include the Navy Distinguished Service Medal, Legion of Merit (6), Meritorious Service Medal (3), Navy and Marine Corps Commendation Medal (2), Navy and Marine Corps Achievement Medal (2), Armed Forces Expeditionary Medal, Global War on Terrorism Expeditionary Medal, and other personal, campaign, and service awards.

== See also ==
- List of female United States military generals and flag officers
- Women in the United States Navy
