= Dixie Station =

Geographic position used by the US Navy during the Vietnam war

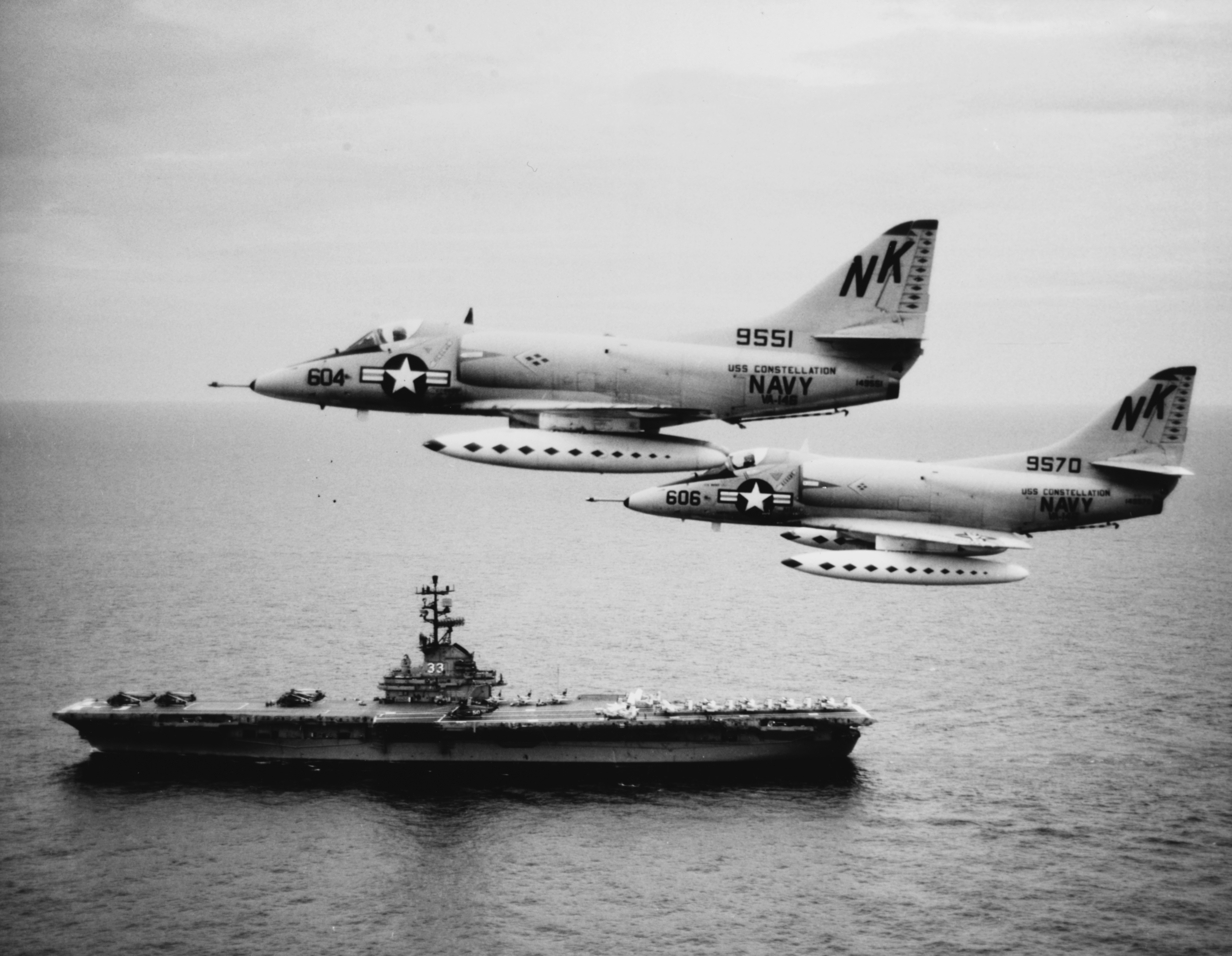
Two Douglas A-4C Skyhawk fly past the anti-submarine aircraft carrier USS Kearsarge (CVS-33), 1964

Positions of Dixie and Yankee Stations.

Dixie Station was a geographic position during the Vietnam War in the South China Sea off the Mekong Delta from which United States Navy aircraft carriers launched strikes providing close air support for American and Army of the Republic of Vietnam (ARVN) ground troops in South Vietnam. It was located about 130 km due southeast of Cam Ranh Bay, at 11° N and 110° E in 600 m (2000 ft) of water.

Dixie Station was established on 15 May 1965 as a single-carrier counterpart to the multi-carrier Yankee Station, which was located further north near the mouth of the Gulf of Tonkin and was responsible for strikes on North Vietnamese targets. Targets for Yankee Station strikes were personally selected (sometimes months in advance) by President Lyndon Johnson and Secretary of Defense, Robert McNamara, resulting in notoriously restrictive rules of engagement. In contrast, Dixie Station missions were carried out in response to requests for close air support by friendly ground forces engaging enemy guerrillas in South Vietnam. The strike forces were usually vectored on to their target in real time by a ground-based forward air controller.

The name "Dixie" was chosen to match that of the phonetic-alphabet-designated "Yankee," resulting in a pun relating to the traditional slang terms for the Northern United States and Southern United States, with Yankee bombing the North, and Dixie the South.

Aircraft carriers continued rotating on station at Dixie flying in support of friendly forces until 3 August 1966, when enough land-based aircraft had become available to support operations in the area that aircraft carrier support no longer was needed. Yankee Station, in contrast, remained in use until August 1973.

== See also ==
- Gonzo station
