= USS Shasta (AE-33) =

Ammunition ship of the United States Navy

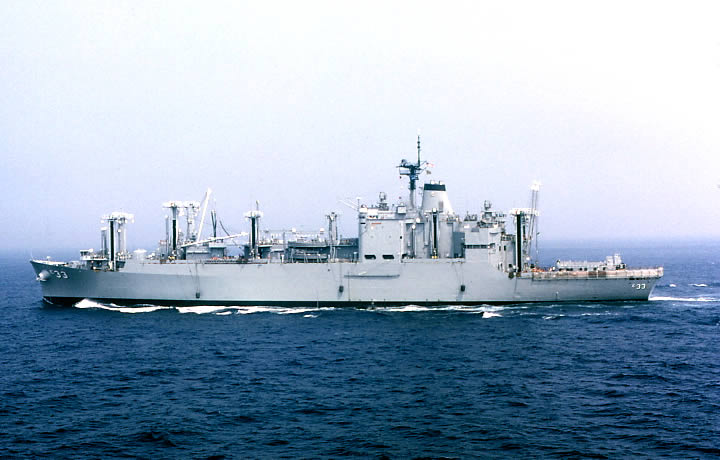
- USS Shasta in 1974

History

United States
- Name: USS Shasta (AE-33)
- Namesake: Mount Shasta
- Awarded: 8 March 1968
- Builder: Ingalls Shipbuilding
- Laid down: 10 November 1969
- Launched: 3 April 1971
- Sponsored by: Mrs. Ralph W. Cousins
- Commissioned: 26 February 1972
- Decommissioned: 1 October 1997
- In service: with Military Sealift Command 1 October 1997
- Out of service: 7 April 2011, Pearl Harbor
- Home port: Naval Weapons Station, Concord, California
- Identification: MMSI number: 338901000; Callsign: NRNC
- Motto: "We serve anytime, anywhere;" "It has to be Shasta;" "Max Flex"
- Fate: Scrapped, Brownsville, Texas, 2013–2014

General characteristics
- Class & type: Kilauea-class ammunition ship
- Displacement: 10,417 long tons (10,584 t) light; 18,088 long tons (18,378 t) full load
- Length: 564 ft (172 m)
- Beam: 81 ft (25 m)
- Draft: 27 ft (8.2 m)
- Installed power: 22,000 shp (16,405 kW)
- Propulsion: 3 × Foster-Wheeler water tube boilers; 1 × General Electric geared steam turbine; 1 × shaft with six-blade fixed-pitch propeller
- Speed: 23 knots (43 km/h)
- Complement: 28 officers(with air detachment; 20 without); 375 enlisted (with air detachment; 350 without)
- Armament: 2 × 3"/50 caliber twin mounts; 12 × 0.5 in (12.7 mm) guns; 2 × Phalanx CIWS; AN/SLQ-25 Nixie; Chaff
- Aircraft carried: 2 × CH-46 Sea Knight helicopters

USS Shasta (AE-33) was a Kilauea-class replenishment ammunition ship of the United States Navy. She was named after Mount Shasta, a volcano in the Cascade Range in northern California. Shasta's mission was to support forward deployed aircraft carrier battle groups, which she accomplished through underway replenishment (known as "unrep") and vertical replenishment (known as "vertrep"). Over three decades, Shasta and her crew took part in the Vietnam War, the Cold War, the Iran–Iraq War, Desert Shield/Operation Desert Storm, and numerous other actions.

To accomplish her underway replenishment mission, Shasta utilized seven underway replenishment stations utilizing the Standard Tensioned Replenishment Alongside Method (STREAM), and utilized four cargo booms to load and unload cargo. To accomplish her vertical replenishment mission, Shasta embarked two CH-46 Sea Knight helicopters together with their air and maintenance crews; Shasta's ship's company ran the flight deck and tower.

== Construction and commissioning ==
Shasta's keel was laid down 10 November 1969 at the Ingalls shipyard in Pascagoula, Mississippi, sponsored by Mrs. Ralph W. Cousins, wife of the Vice Chief of Naval Operations. She was launched on 3 April 1971. Upon completion, the builder took her to Charleston, South Carolina and delivered her to the Navy. Shasta was commissioned in Charleston on 26 February 1972.

Shasta was a combat logistics ship whose primary missions were underway replenishment ("UNREP"), where it passed cargo and supplies to other warships steaming alongside close aboard, and vertical replenishment ("VERTREP"), where helicopters would transfer cargo to nearby ships. The main supplies transferred by Shasta was ammunition (bombs, missiles, etc.), but she also transferred significant quantities of fuel oil (Diesel Fuel Marine, or DFM, also known as NATO F76), spare parts, food, dry goods and personnel.

Shasta's initial armament included four twin 3"/50 caliber gun mounts and multiple .50 caliber machine gun positions.

One of Shasta's innovations was a covered main deck, which allowed for protected cargo handling operations, and fork truck use from the flight deck to the forward cargo holds and unrep stations.

For a ship of its large size, Shasta had an interesting engineering design. It featured three 600 psi (4.1 MPa) Foster-Wheeler water-tube boilers driving only one General Electric geared steam turbine connected to one six-bladed fixed-pitch propeller while having a prominent bulbous bow.

== 1970s – entering service and Vietnam ==
After fitting out, the newly commissioned Shasta departed Charleston on 22 May 1972 for her shakedown cruise and training at Guantanamo Bay, Cuba. After completing shakedown and training on 10 June, she headed for the Pacific, where her new homeport was to be the Naval Weapons Station in Concord, California. Along the way, she made port visits to Kingston, Jamaica; Cartagena, Colombia; Panama City, Canal Zone; and Acapulco, Mexico. She passed through the Panama Canal and finally arrived in Concord on 3 July.

After arrival in Concord, she underwent ship's qualification trials and final contract trials. Upon completion of trials and preparations for deployment, Shasta departed Concord to join the 7th Fleet in the western Pacific (WestPac in US Navy terminology) on 3 January 1973 in support of operations off Vietnam during the Vietnam War, returning to Concord in July 1973.

Shasta made additional WestPac deployments:

- July–December 1974
- April–November 1977
- September 1978 – April 1979
- September 1979 – June 1980, with HC-11 Detachment 7 embarked with two CH-46 helicopters

During the 1979–1980 deployment, Shasta deployed as part of a task force in the Indian Ocean/Arabian Sea off the coast of Iran during the Iranian hostage crisis, for which it received the Navy Expeditionary Medal.

== 1980s – Western Pacific and the Middle East ==
=== Armament ===
Shasta's armament was upgraded during the Cold War to include chaff and two Vulcan Phalanx CIWS 20MM Gatling gun close-in weapon systems for missile defense and AN/SLQ-25 Nixie for anti-torpedo defense. During the 1980s Shasta conducted many Cold War operations, and many operations related to United States interests in the Iran–Iraq War.

=== Deployments during the early 1980s ===
Shasta made the following deployments during the early 1980s:

- September 1980 – April 1981: Western Pacific & Indian Ocean/North Arabian Sea with HC-11 Detachment 7 embarked with two CH-46D helicopters. During this deployment, Shasta rescued 298 Vietnamese and Cambodian refugees in the South China Sea, for which Shasta's crew received the Humanitarian Service Medal.
- September 1982 – April 1983: (While transiting from San Francisco to Hawaii, received orders to swap deployment mission to Indian Ocean with USS Sacramento's western Pacific mission.) Western & Northern Pacific. Port Calls included: Hawaii, Adak Alaska x2, Subic Bay Philippines, Pattaya Beach Thailand x2, Hong Kong, Guam (1 month), Chinhae & Inchon South Korea, Sasebo & Okinawa & Yokosuka Japan. Helicopter Combat Support Squadron Eleven (HC-11) Detachment One from Naval Air Station North Island, San Diego California – Deployed for Support Operations, with Two Boeing HH-46A Sea Knight Helicopters.

=== 1985 deployment to Western Pacific and Middle East ===
Shasta deployed to the Western Pacific and Indian Oceans in 1985 under the command of Commander Barry N. Kaye to support United States interests in the Iran–Iraq War. Shasta deployed as part of the USS Kitty Hawk (CV-63) battle group Brovo. Shasta supported the Kitty Hawk battle group in the North Arabian Sea and Gulf of Oman off the entrance to the Strait of Hormuz. The ship and her crew made port calls at Mombasa, Kenya, Subic Bay Naval Base, and Pearl Harbor, Hawaii, and conducted airhead operations at al-Masirah, Oman. The crew earned the Sea Service Deployment Ribbon for its service on the deployment.

=== 1987 deployment to Western Pacific and Middle East ===
Shasta operated with the Carl Vinson (CVN-70) battle group in the Gulf of Alaska 24 January to 6 February 1987. Shasta conducted these operations during a major winter storm in the Gulf of Alaska.

Shasta deployed to the Western Pacific and Indian Oceans 14 July to 30 December 1987, including three months in the North Arabian Sea and Gulf of Oman in support of Operation Earnest Will, with Battle Group Echo, formed around the Ranger (CV-61), and the Missouri (BB-63) surface action group under the command of Joint Task Force Middle East (now United States Naval Forces Central Command). This included three months on station off the coast of Iran and the Hormuz Strait with the Task Force in Gonzo Station. Other ships in this combined task force included Long Beach (CGN-9), Bunker Hill (CG-52), Gridley (DLG-21), John Young (DD-973), Leftwich (DD-984), Buchanan (DDG-14), Hoel (DDG-13), Robert E. Peary (FF-1073), Harold E. Holt (FF-1074), Curts (FFG-38), Reuben James (FFG-57), Wichita (AOR-1), Kansas City (AOR-3) and Hassayampa (AO-145).

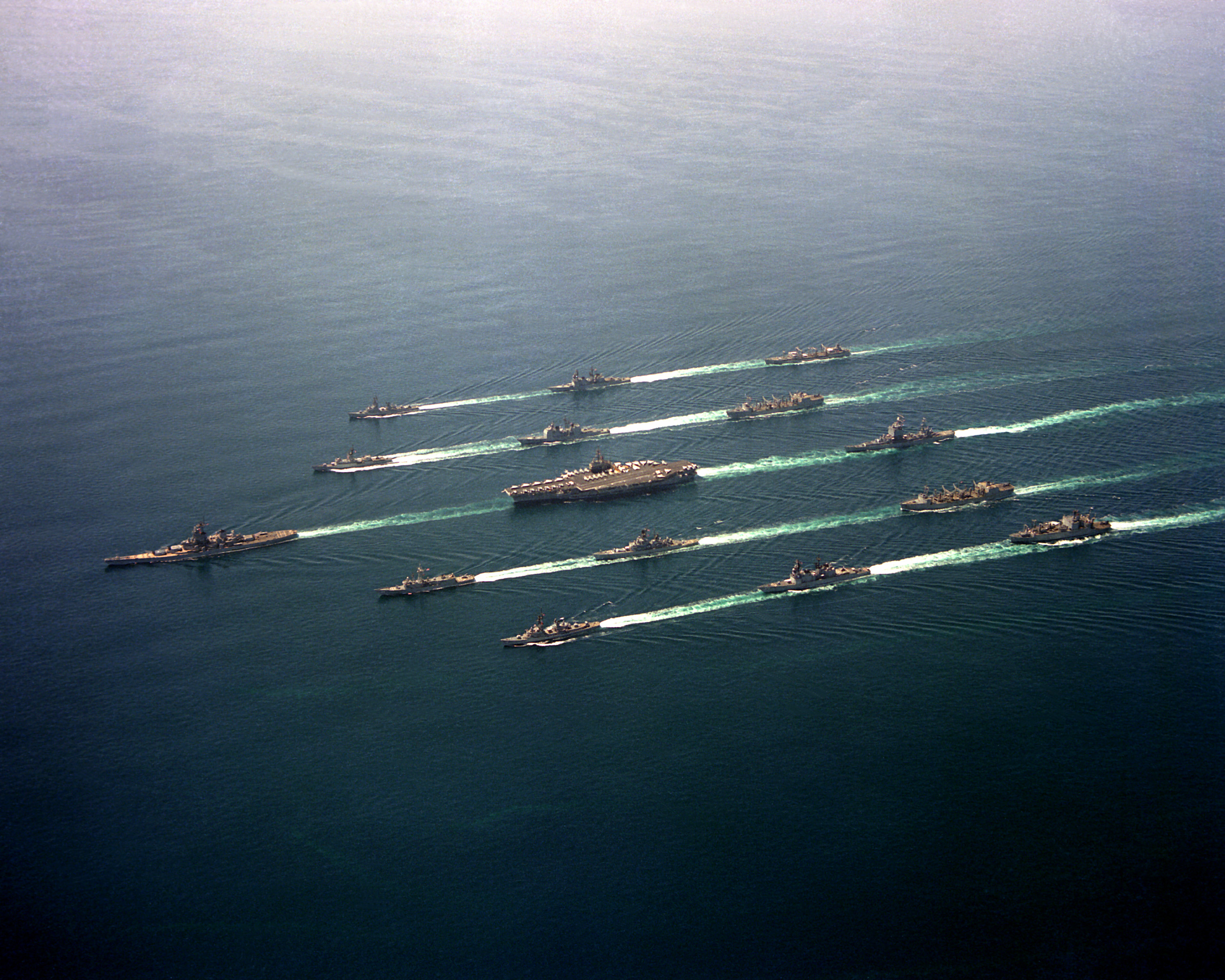
Shasta with Battle Group Echo off the coast of Iran, October 1987

During the deployment Shasta conducted many airhead operations at al-Masirah, Oman. During its time on station, Shasta sortied to rearm destroyers in support of Operation Nimble Archer. Also during this deployment, Shasta made port visits at Lualualei in Pearl Harbor, Hawaii; Subic Bay, Luzon, Philippines (two); Singapore; Diego Garcia, British Indian Ocean Territories; Pattaya, Thailand; and Hong Kong. Shasta was also involved in Cold War operations during the deployment, and had frequent contact with Soviet vessels and aircraft. Shasta transited the Northern, Eastern and Western Pacific Ocean the San Bernardino Strait; the South China Sea; the Straits of Malacca; the Bay of Bengal; the Singapore Strait; the northern and southern Indian Ocean; the Gulf of Thailand; the Philippine Sea; the North Arabian Sea; the Gulf of Oman; and into the mouth of the Strait of Hormuz. Shasta's crew was awarded the Armed Forces Expeditionary Medal and the Sea Service Deployment Ribbon for their service on this deployment. During the deployment, en route from Thailand to Hong Kong, Shasta sailed through a super typhoon in the South China Sea, sustaining damage, but never reducing her operational capacity. During this deployment, Shasta steamed 44,633 nautical miles, and at one point spent 79 consecutive days at sea on station off the coast of Iran, most at condition III (wartime steaming). Shasta crossed the Equator in the Indian Ocean en route to Diego Garcia and held a line-crossing ceremony and initiated the shellbacks into the solemn mysteries of the Ancient Order of the Deep. Prior to transit east through the Straits of Malacca and back into the Pacific Ocean, Shasta turned over her duties in the Middle East to her sister ship, the USNS Kilauea.

=== Drug interdiction operations ===
In 1988, Shasta supported drug smuggling interdiction operations off Baja California, and conducted a "show the flag" port visit in Mazatlán, Mexico.

=== 1989 deployment to Bering Sea and Western Pacific ===
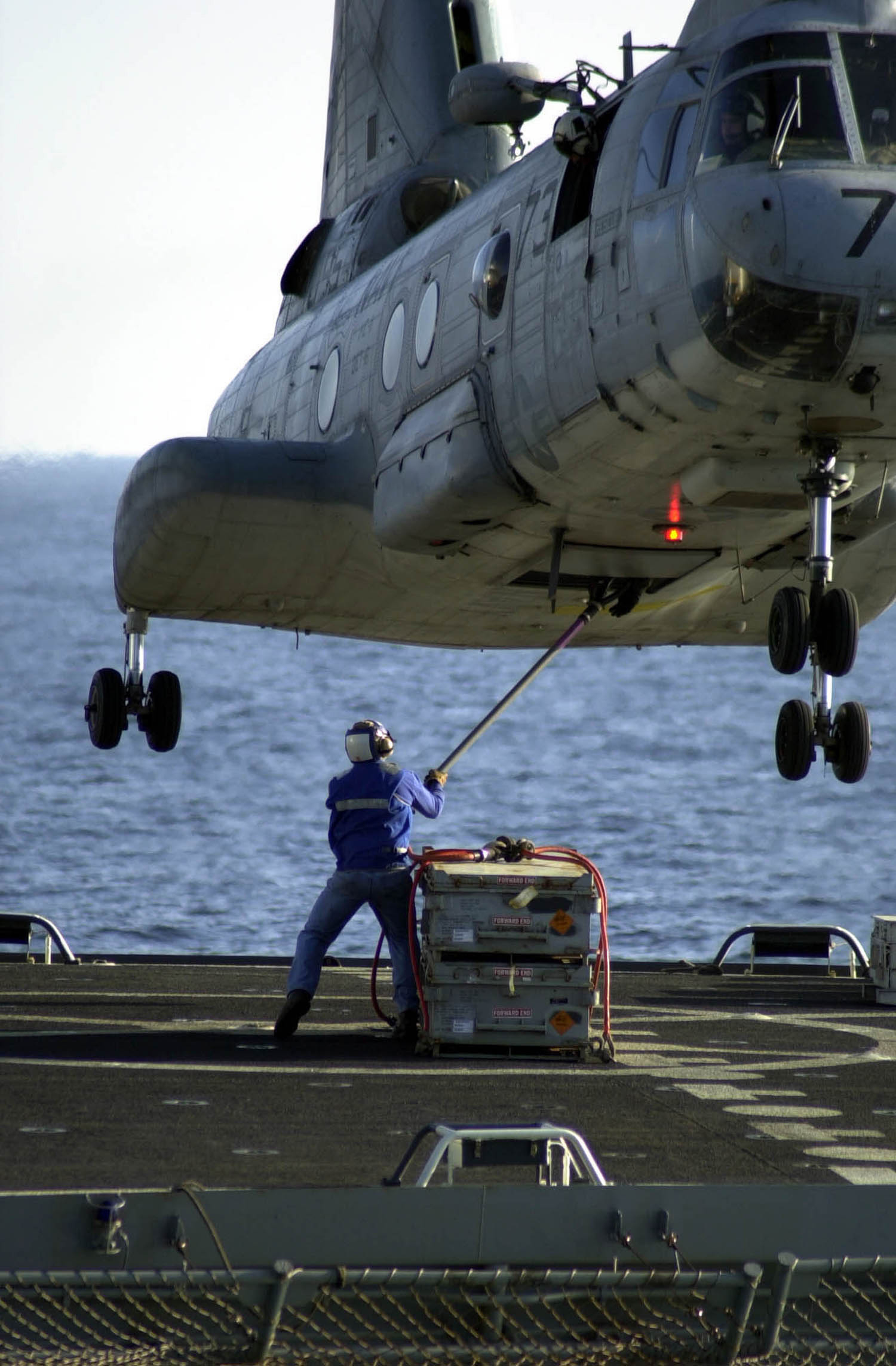
Shasta's flight deck crew attaching a cargo pendant to the bottom of an CH-46 during vertrep operations on deployment.

In 1989, under the command of Commander Daniel A. Gabe, Shasta deployed independently to the Gulf of Alaska, Aleutian Islands, and Bering Sea during PACEX 89 as a show of force against the Soviet Union. While operating independently during PACEX, Shasta conducted operations in conjunction with several aircraft carrier and battleship task forces, including operations with the New Jersey (BB-62). Thereafter, Shasta deployed independently to the Western Pacific, South China Sea, East China Sea and Philippine Sea for logistics operations in Eastern Asia, all for Cold War operations. During this deployment, Shasta conducted airhead operations at Cold Bay, Alaska and King Cove, Alaska (both on the Alaskan Peninsula), and Amchitka, Alaska (in the Rat Islands of the Aleutian Chain). Shasta transited the San Bernardino Strait, Amchitka Pass, Unimak Pass, and the Andreanof Islands. Shasta made port calls at Guam; Subic Bay, Luzon, Philippines; Hong Kong; Okinawa; Sasebo, Japan; Yokosuka, Japan; and Pearl Harbor. When Shasta arrived in Hong Kong, the crew learned that the Berlin Wall had fallen, one of the final episodes of the Cold War. Shasta maneuvered through a major winter storm during its transit of the Bering Sea, and engaged in typhoon evasion in the Philippine Sea, San Bernardino Strait and South China Sea; Luzon sustained significant damage from the typhoon.

Shasta's crew received a Meritorious Unit Commendation and Sea Service Deployment Ribbon for their service on this deployment. While Shasta was deployed, its home port, the San Francisco Bay Area was hit by the Loma Prieta earthquake, which affected the families of many crew members. The face of the city to which the crew returned had changed considerably.

=== Shipyards ===
Shasta underwent major overhauls on the San Francisco waterfront in 1986 and 1988, including several months in dry dock in 1988.

=== Homeport ===
Shasta's home port was Concord Naval Weapons Station, on the Suisun Bay in the Sacramento River. However, Shasta spent much of its inport time at Mare Island Naval Shipyard on the Napa River in Vallejo, California; Naval Air Station Alameda in Alameda, California on the South San Francisco Bay; and Naval Supply Center, Oakland and Oakland Army Base, both in Oakland, California also on the South San Francisco Bay. Shasta also spent several months every two years at various shipyards on the south San Francisco waterfront. This situation of going to sea from one port and returning to another led to many logistical difficulties for the ship's crew.

=== Blessing of the Fleet and community involvement ===
Shasta had a special relationship with the Benicia Yacht Club, in Benicia, California, and participated in many of its Blessing of the Fleet ceremonies in the Carquinez Strait of the Sacramento River, leading to many memorable festivities. Shasta also participated in Fleet Week in San Francisco Bay.

Shasta's crew participated in community events in Shasta, California, her namesake city and near her namesake Mount Shasta, and extinct volcano in Northern California, including Shasta's honor guard marching in holiday parades.

Shasta trained midshipmen from NROTC and the United States Naval Academy. Shasta also hosted "tiger cruises" for family members and Navy veterans through the Navy League.

== 1990s – Desert Storm and transfer to MSC ==
In early 1990, Shasta underwent a major shipyard overhaul on the San Francisco waterfront, and conducted sea trials in May 1990. Among other upgrades, the berthing compartments were upgraded to accommodate approximately 45 enlisted women.

Shasta deployed in support of Operations Desert Storm and Desert Shield from 8 December 1990 to 8 June 1991.

Shasta deployed to the Western Pacific, Indian Ocean and Persian Gulf in 1993. Shasta underwent shipyard overhaul, including dry dock from January through June 1994. Shasta also deployed to the Western Pacific, Indian Ocean and Persian Gulf from November 1995 through June 1996. This was Shasta's last deployment before her decommissioning transfer to Military Sealift Command. Commander Carol M. Pottenger was the ships captain between 8 March 1996 and 1 August 1997.

== Transfer to Military Sealift Command ==
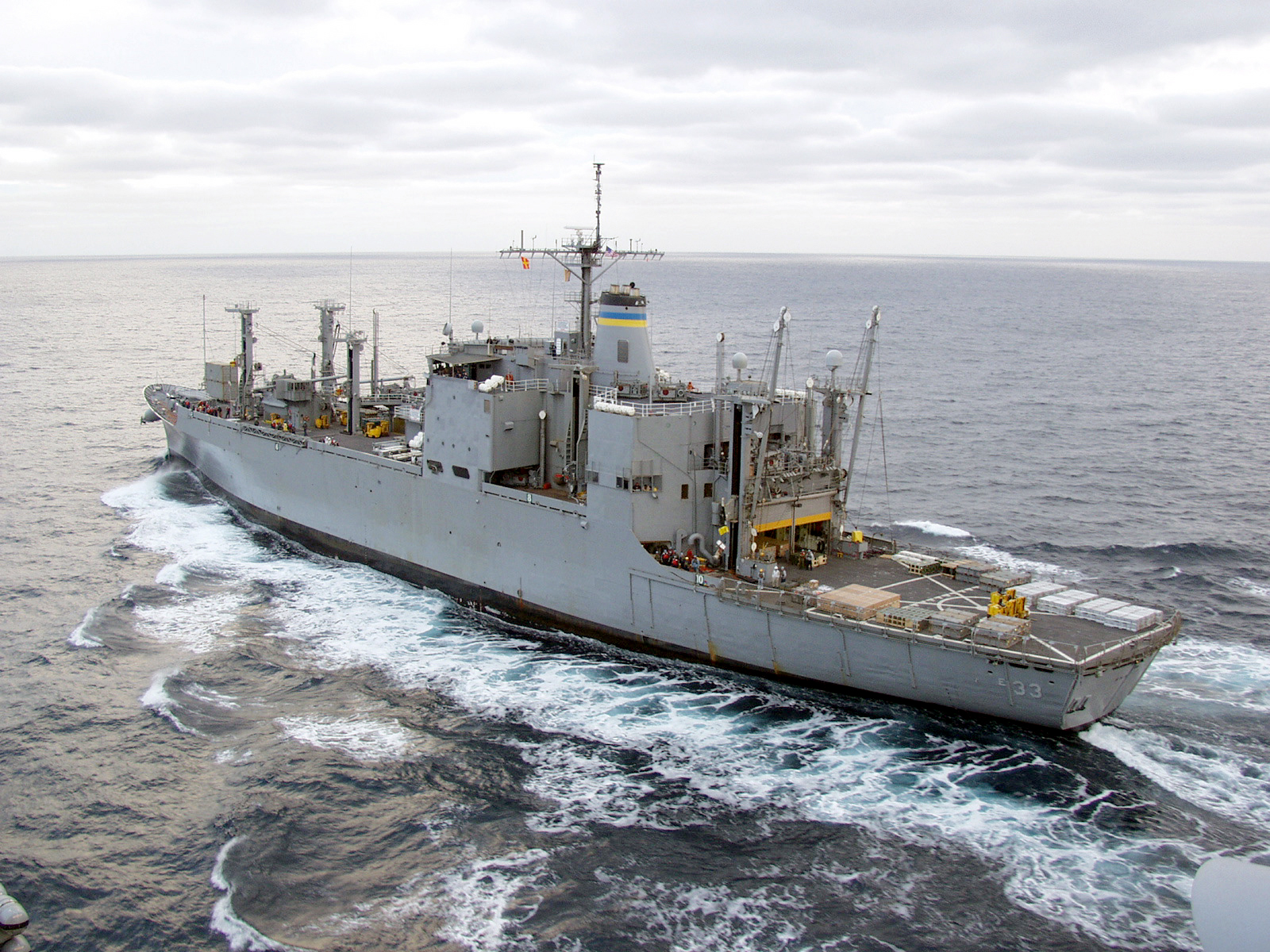
Shasta in the Pacific, 2002

Shasta was decommissioned on 1 October 1997 as a "United States Ship" and transferred to the Fleet Auxiliary Force of the Military Sealift Command (MSC) as a "United States Naval Ship". On the same day, her hull number was changed and she became USNS Shasta (T-AE-33). Shasta served in the Pacific and Indian Oceans for MSC.

== Fate ==
Shasta was inactivated on 7 April 2011 and transferred the reserve fleet, resting in reserve in Pearl Harbor, Hawaii.

In 2013, Shasta was towed from Pearl Harbor to Brownsville, Texas, where, scrapping was completed in May 2014.

The Navy donated Shasta's anchor to the city of Crowley, Texas. In April 2014 it was placed in Crowley's Veterans Plaza.

== Awards and commendations ==
Shasta received the following awards:

- Vietnam Service Medal
- Sea Service Deployment Ribbon: 1982–1983, 1985, 1987, 1989, 1991
- Armed Forces Expeditionary Medal (3): 1987 (Operation Earnest Will)
- Navy Unit Commendation: 1989, 1991
- Navy Meritorious Unit Commendation (4)
- Navy E Ribbon (2)
- Navy Expeditionary Medal (2-Iran/Indian Ocean)
- National Defense Service Medal (2): Vietnam, Desert Storm/Desert Shield
- Southwest Asia Service Medal
- Global War on Terrorism Expeditionary Medal
- Humanitarian Service Medal (4)
- Kuwait Liberation Medal (Kuwait)

== In popular culture ==
- Shasta figured prominently in Tom Clancy's 1989 novel Clear and Present Danger. In the novel, Shasta delivered the weapons that were dropped on a meeting of Colombian drug lords.
