= USNS Bridge =

Supply-class fast combat support ship

Coordinates: 47.5525437°N 122.6544216°W

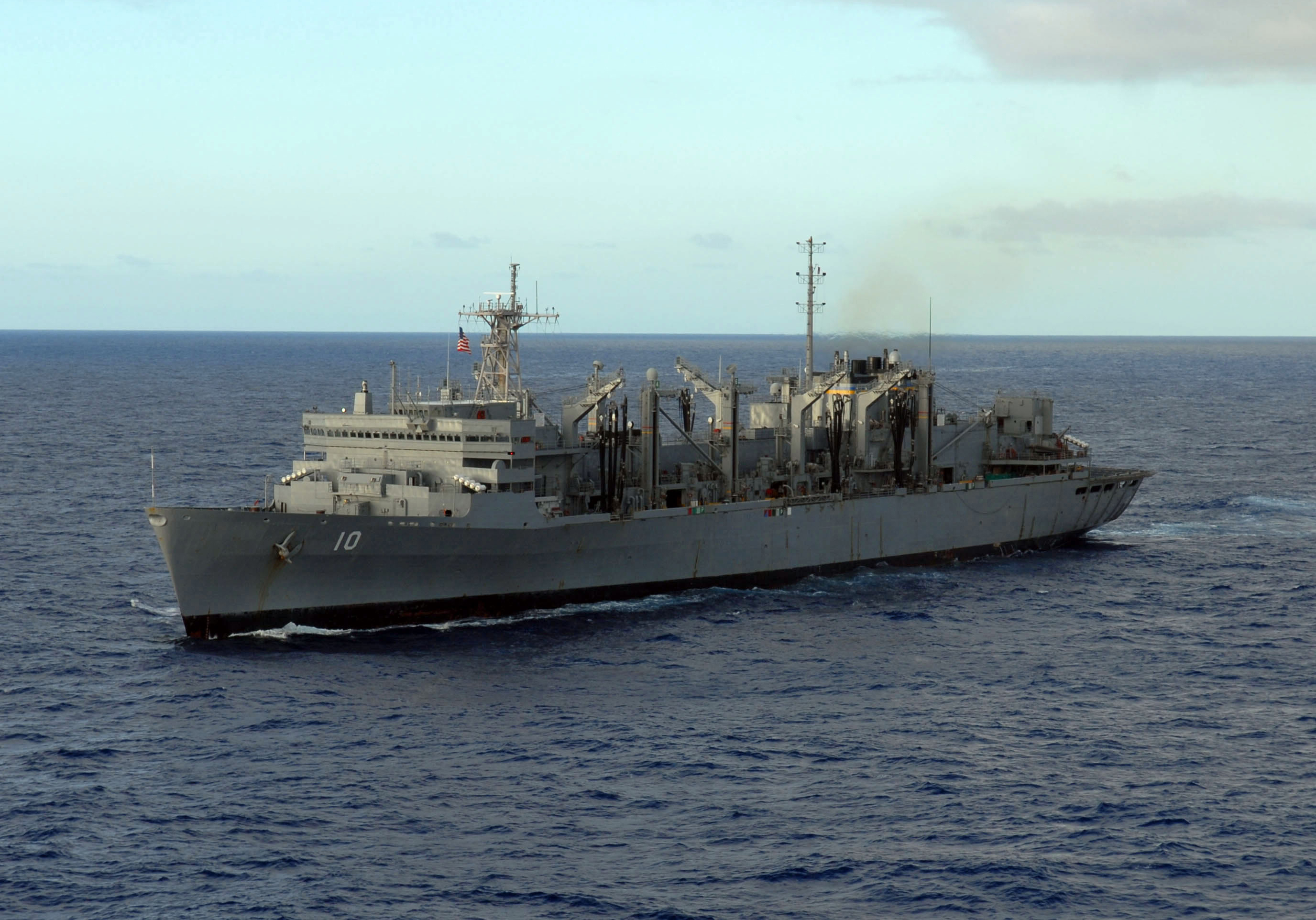

History

United States
- Name: USNS Bridge (T-AOE 10)
- Namesake: Horatio Bridge
- Ordered: 6 December 1989
- Awarded: 15 January 1993
- Builder: National Steel and Shipbuilding Company, San Diego County, California
- Laid down: 2 August 1994
- Launched: 24 August 1996
- Commissioned: 5 August 1998
- Decommissioned: 24 June 2004
- In service: 24 June 2004
- Out of service: 30 September 2014
- Stricken: 15 September 2022
- Identification: Callsign: NGMV
- Status: Stricken

General characteristics
- Class & type: Supply class
- Displacement: 48,800 long tons (49,600 t)
- Length: 754.6 ft (230.0 m)
- Beam: 107 ft (33 m)
- Draught: 39 ft (12 m)
- Installed power: 105,000 hp (78 MW)
- Propulsion: four General Electric LM 2500 gas turbine engines, Two Propellers
- Speed: 26 knots (48 km/h; 30 mph)
- Complement: 176 civilians, 30–45 military
- Aircraft carried: Two CH-46E Sea Knight or MH-60S Seahawk helicopters

USNS Bridge (T-AOE-10), (formerly USS Bridge [AOE-10]), is the fourth ship of the Supply-class of fast combat support ships in the United States Navy. She is the second ship in the Navy named after Horatio Bridge, a Commodore who served during the Civil War. Bridge was commissioned on 5 August 1998.

== History ==
=== 2000s ===
On 29 June 2004, Bridge was formally decommissioned and transferred from the US Navy to Military Sealift Command (MSC). Although the transfer to MSC occurred on 29 June 2004, the ceremony took place on 24 June 2004.

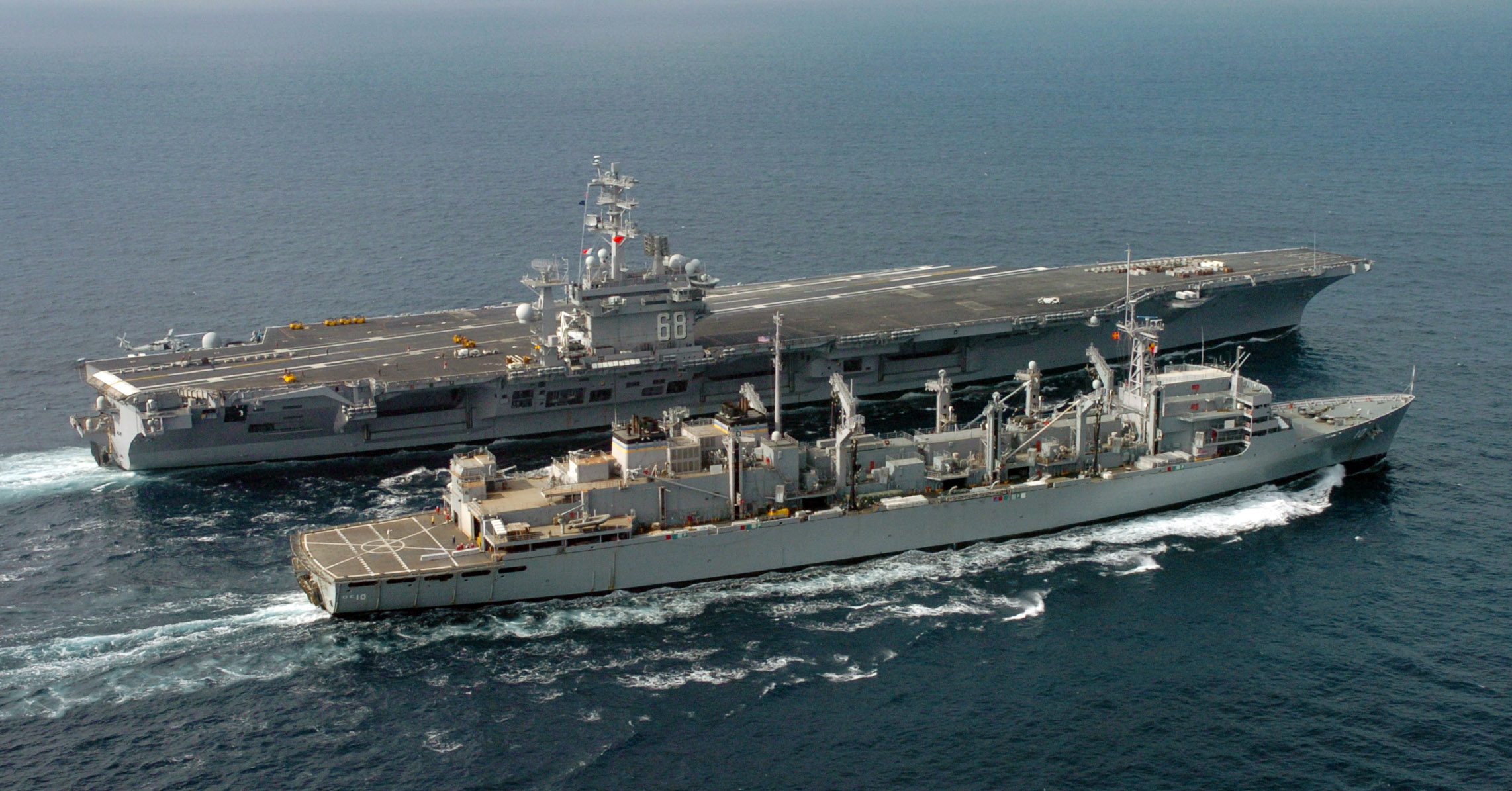
USNS Bridge replenishing USS Nimitz at sea in February 2006

Bridge no longer carries the weapons systems she had been equipped with. As a commissioned warship, Bridge was equipped with two Phalanx CIWS (Block I) mounts, one NSSM launcher (with two Mk 91 directors), two Mk. 38 25-mm chain guns, six .50 caliber heavy machine gun mounts, and two M60 GPMG mounts (on the bow), along with various small arms carried by her Navy crew.

=== 2010s ===
In March 2011, in company with the carrier Ronald Reagan, Bridge was deployed off northeastern Honshu, Japan to assist with relief efforts after the 2011 Tōhoku earthquake and tsunami. After multiple inspections for radiation traces due to the Fukushima nuclear disaster, it was determined that it was unlikely the ship was exposed to the radiation leaking from the Fukushima Daiichi Nuclear Power Plant.

Bridge conducted 25 underway replenishment operations, delivering more than 1.8 million gallons of fuel in support of Operation Tomodachi. The ship was then decommissioned shortly after. In April 2013, it was announced that MSC will take Bridge, and her sister ship Rainier, out of service in 2014 as a cost-saving measure. The ships' gas turbine propulsion make them faster than other Navy supply ships, but also make them consume more fuel.

As of 2018, Bridge was in reserve, at NISMF Bremerton. Two of her commanding officers, CAPT Rick Wren and CAPT Carol Pottenger have since gone on to achieve flag rank.
