= Gonzo Station =

Gulf of Oman Naval Zone of Operations
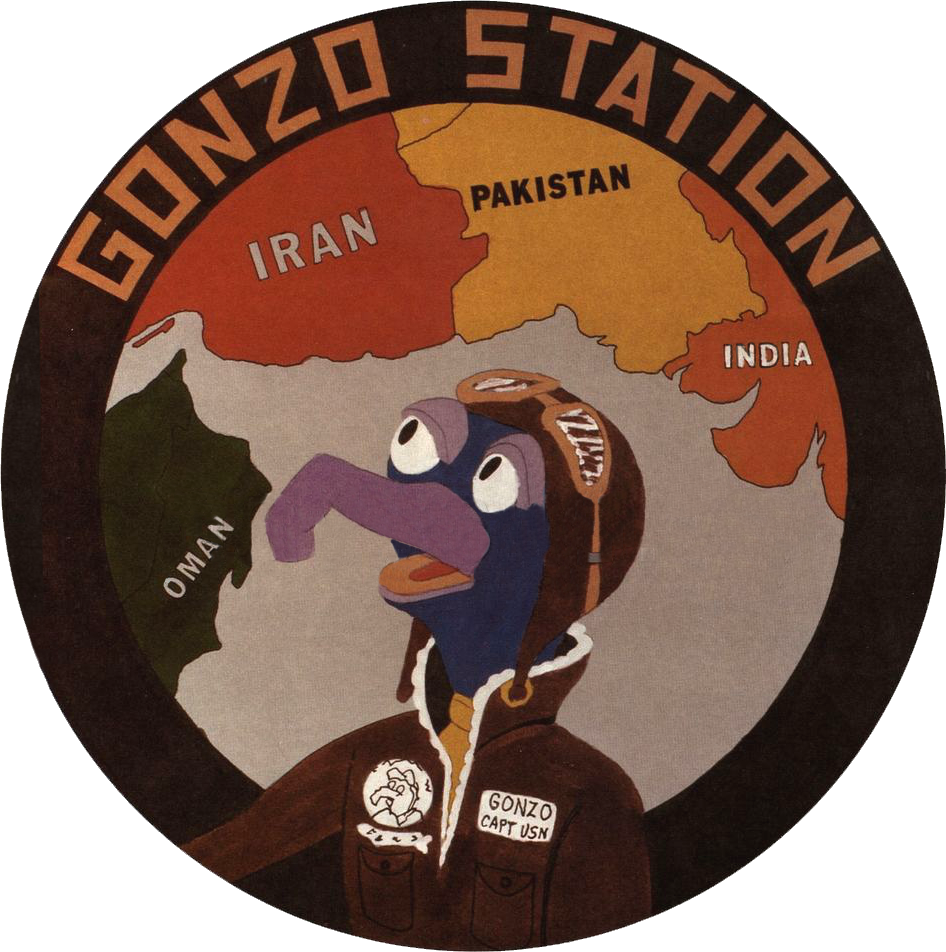
- Active: 1979-1990
- Country: United States
- Branch: United States Navy
- Part of: Commander, Middle East Force

Gonzo Station was a U.S. Navy acronym for "Gulf of Oman Naval Zone of Operations" or "Gulf of Oman Northern Zone." It was used to designate an area of carrier-based naval operations by the U.S. Navy and U.S. Marine Corps in the Indian Ocean during the 1979–1981 Iranian Hostage Crisis and the "Tanker War" between the United States and the Islamic Republic of Iran.

== Carriers deployed ==
Multiple aircraft carriers, their associated air wings and carrier battle groups, and associated sea-based and land-based task forces and task groups served on Gonzo Station. USS Ranger (CV-61), USS Midway (CV-41) and USS Constellation (CV-64) were some of the first carriers on Gonzo Station who were at sea for 110 days or more, the longest at-sea record for a conventional US Navy carrier.

Midway was the first on-scene carrier at the beginning of the Iranian Hostage Crisis, followed shortly after by USS Kitty Hawk (CV-63), with both carriers executing simultaneous air operations and carrier presence in the vicinity of one another off the southern coast of Iran.

USS Nimitz (CV-68) exceeded Midway's record at sea in May 1980 with 144 days at sea. In 1984 Midway was on station for 111 days. Subsequent deployments by other carriers, such as USS America (CV-66) and Kitty Hawk, dwarfed the earlier records with over 180 days at sea, or six months on-station.

Several U.S. Navy carriers from both the Atlantic Fleet and Pacific Fleet served repeated deployments on Gonzo Station, including Ranger, Midway, USS Enterprise (CVN-65), America, USS Independence (CV-62), Kitty Hawk, Constellation, USS Coral Sea (CV-43), Nimitz and USS Dwight D. Eisenhower (CVN-69). While replenishment ships normally rotated on and off the line in order to resupply, USS Roanoke (AOR-7) served in formation for 180 days, and USS Shasta (AE-33) served in formation for 78 days.

In 1980, the Dwight D. Eisenhower served 315 days of deployed sea time with a consecutive 154-day line period. This was the largest deployment of US Navy ships to the Indian Ocean since World War II.

== See also ==
- Operation Eagle Claw
- Operation Earnest Will
- Operation Prime Chance
- Yankee station
- Gonzo (Muppet)
