= List of ship launches in 1958 =

The list of ship launches in 1958 includes a chronological list of all ships launched in 1958.

Date	Ship	Class / type	Builder	Location	Country	Notes
4 January	Edson	Forrest Sherman-class destroyer	Bath Iron Works	Bath, Maine	United States	
7 January	Caxton	Cargo ship	Blyth Dry Docks & Shipbuilding Co. Ltd	Blyth, Northumberland	United Kingdom	For Transatlantic Carriers Ltd.
8 January	Pinar Del Rio	Cargo ship	Atlantic Shipbuilding Co. Ltd	Newport	United Kingdom	For Baco Cubano del Comercio Exterior.
20 January	Iron Age	Ore carrier	Harland & Wolff	Belfast	United Kingdom	For Vallum Shipping Co.
January	J.H.C. 800	Barge	Alabama Drydock and Shipbuilding Company	Mobile, Alabama	United States	For J. H. Coppedge Co.
January	J.H.C. 801	Barge	Alabama Drydock and Shipbuilding Company	Mobile, Alabama	United States	For J. H. Coppedge Co.
January	J.H.C. 803	Barge	Alabama Drydock and Shipbuilding Company	Mobile, Alabama	United States	For J. H. Coppedge Co.
1 February	Seeadler	Seeadler-class fast attack craft			West Germany	
22 February	Schleswig-Holstein	Ferry	Husumer Schiffswerft GmbH	Husum	West Germany	For Wyker Dampfschiffs-Reederei Amrum GmbH
22 February	Pelamida	Fishing trawler	Brooke Marine Ltd.	Lowestoft	United Kingdom	For private owner.
February	J.H.C. 802	Barge	Alabama Drydock and Shipbuilding Company	Mobile, Alabama	United States	For J. H. Coppedge Co.
7 March	Vestfonn	Tanker	Harland & Wolff	Belfast	United Kingdom	For Sigval Bergsen.
20 March	New Mexico	Tanker	Harland & Wolff	Belfast	United Kingdom	For Texaco Oil Co.
9 April	Adler	Fishing trawler	Brooke Marine Ltd.	Lowestoft	United Kingdom	For private owner.
9 April	Seskar	Fishing trawler	Brooke Marine Ltd.	Lowestoft	United Kingdom	For private owner.
15 April	Growler	Grayback-class submarine	Portsmouth Naval Shipyard	Kittery, Maine	United States	
5 May	Turner Joy	Forrest Sherman-class destroyer	Puget Sound Bridge and Dredging Company	Seattle, Washington	United States	
15 May	Tri-Ellis	Phosphate carrier	Harland & Wolff	Belfast	United Kingdom	For British Phosphate Carriers.
19 May	Wakefield	Coaster	Harland & Wolff	Belfast	United Kingdom	For Associated Humber Lines.
23 May	Ase Creek	Tug	J. Bolson & Son Ltd.	Poole	United Kingdom	For Shell B.P. Petroleum Development Co. of Nigeria.
23 May	Morton	Forrest Sherman-class destroyer	Ingalls Shipbuilding	Pascagoula, Mississippi	United States	
26 May	Skipjack	Skipjack-class submarine	Electric Boat	Groton, Connecticut	United States	
30 May	Somers	Forrest Sherman-class destroyer	Bath Iron Works	Bath, Maine	United States	
May	El Dorado	Submersible	Alabama Drydock and Shipbuilding Company	Mobile, Alabama	United States	For Ocean Drilling & Exploration.
6 June	Independence	Forrestal-class aircraft carrier	New York Navy Yard	Brooklyn, New York	United States	
7 June	Edmund Fitzgerald	Great Lakes freighter	Great Lakes Engineering Works	River Rouge, Michigan	United States	
18 June	Trishul	Whitby-class frigate	Harland & Wolff	Belfast	United Kingdom	For Indian Navy.
19 June	Minchbank	Cargo ship	Harland & Wolff	Belfast	United Kingdom	For Bank Line.
23 June	Rheinstahl	Nordseewerke Bulk Carrier 17.100 tdw	Nordseewerke	Emden	West Germany	For Rheinische Stahlwerke/Seereederei Frigga
25 June	Nitro	Nitro-class ammunition ship	Bethlehem Sparrows Point Shipyard	Sparrows Point, Maryland	United States	
26 June	Bleichen	Cargo ship	Nobiskrug Shipyard	Rendsburg	West Germany	Museum ship in Hamburg since 2007
2 July	Carrigan Head	Cargo ship	Harland & Wolff	Belfast	United Kingdom	For Ulster Steamship Co.
3 July	Oakington	Ton-class minesweeper	Harland & Wolff	Belfast	United Kingdom	For Royal Navy.
14 July	Lantic Bay	Dredger	Brazen Island Shipyard Ltd.	Polruan	United Kingdom	For Fowey Harbour Commissioners.
16 July	DhruvaK	Mooring vessel	Hindustan Shipyard Limited	Visakhapatnam	India	For Indian Navy
18 July	Farragut	Farragut-class destroyer	Bethlehem Steel	Quincy, Massachusetts	United States	
19 July	Barbel	Barbel-class submarine	Portsmouth Naval Shipyard	Kittery, Maine	United States	
29 July	Arenberg	Nordseewerke Bulk Carrier 17.100 tdw	Nordseewerke	Emden	West Germany	For Rheinische Stahlwerke/Seereederei Frigga
31 July	Murasame	Murasame-class destroyer			Japan	
31 July	Yudachi	Murasame-class destroyer			Japan	
1 August	Cevic	Fishing trawler	Brooke Marine Ltd.	Lowestoft	United Kingdom	For Cevic Steam Fishing Ltd.
13 August	Hans Hedtoft	Ocean liner	Frederikshavns Værft	Frederikshavn	Denmark	For Royal Greenland Trading Company
15 August	King Henry	Cargo ship	Harland & Wolff	Belfast	United Kingdom	For King Line.
16 August	Seadragon	Skate-class submarine	Portsmouth Naval Shipyard	Kittery, Maine	United States	
19 August	Kirpan	Blackwood-class frigate	Alexander Stephen and Sons	Glasgow, Scotland	United Kingdom	For Indian Navy
19 August	Triton	Unique nuclear-powered submarine	Electric Boat	Groton, Connecticut	United States	
23 August	Gorch Fock	Gorch-Fock-class Training ship	Blohm + Voss	Hamburg	West Germany	For German Navy
28 August	Corhaven	Tanker	Blyth Dry Docks & Shipbuilding Co. Ltd	Blyth, Northumberland	United Kingdom	For William Cory & Son Ltd.
August	Chem IV	Tank barge	Alabama Drydock and Shipbuilding Company	Mobile, Alabama	United States	For Commercial Transport Corp.
August	139	Barge	Alabama Drydock and Shipbuilding Company	Mobile, Alabama	United States	For H. J. Branigan & Co.
August	140	Barge	Alabama Drydock and Shipbuilding Company	Mobile, Alabama	United States	For H. J. Branigan & Co.
August	Unnamed	Barge	Alabama Drydock and Shipbuilding Company	Mobile, Alabama	United States	For City of Mobile.
14 September	Rotterdam	Ocean liner	Rotterdam Drydock Company	Rotterdam	Netherlands	For Holland America Line
23 September	Bulimba	Cargo ship	Harland & Wolff	Belfast	United Kingdom	For British India Steam Navigation Company.
30 September	Yarra	River-class destroyer escort	Williamstown Naval Dockyard	Williamstown, Victoria	Australia	
11 October	Presidente Juscelino	Fronape-class oil tanker	Verolme United Dockyards	Rotterdam	Netherlands	
14 October	Kuthar	Blackwood-class frigate	J. Samuel White	Cowes, Isle of Wight	United Kingdom	For Indian Navy
16 October	Advice	Confiance-class tug	Harland & Wolff	Belfast	United Kingdom	For Royal Navy.
16 October	Melrose Abbey	Cargo liner	Brooke Marine Ltd.	Lowestoft	United Kingdom	For Associated Humber Lines Ltd.
28 October	Torrey Canyon	Tanker	Newport News Shipbuilding	Norfolk, Virginia	United States	For Barracuda Tanker Corporation
2 November	Y.C.482	Lighter	J. Bolson & Son Ltd.	Poole	United Kingdom	For Admiralty.
5 November	Pyro	Nitro-class ammunition ship	Bethlehem Sparrows Point Shipyard	Sparrows Point, Maryland	United States	
8 November	Dumbleton	Ton-class minesweeper	Harland & Wolff	Belfast	United Kingdom	For Royal Navy.
8 November	Otto Springorum	Bulk carrier	Nordseewerke	Emden	West Germany	For Partenreederei „Otto Springorum“ / Seereederei Frigga
12 November	Las Vilas	Cargo ship	Atlantic Shipbuilding Co. Ltd	Newport	United Kingdom	For Banco Cubano del Comercio Exterior.
20 November	Harpalycus	Cargo ship	Blyth Dry Docks & Shipbuilding Co. Ltd	Blyth, Northumberland	United Kingdom	For National Steamship Co. Ltd.
22 November	Bonefish	Barbel-class submarine	New York Shipbuilding	Camden, New Jersey	United States	
27 November	British Statesman	Tanker	Harland & Wolff	Belfast	United Kingdom	For British Tanker Company.
28 November	Sand Grebe	Dredger	J. Bolson & Son Ltd.	Poole	United Kingdom	For South Coast Shipping Co. Ltd.
30 November	Dewey	Farragut-class destroyer	Bath Iron Works	Bath, Maine	United States	
2 December	Leeds	Coaster	Harland & Wolff	Belfast	United Kingdom	For Associated Humber Lines.
6 December	Coontz	Farragut-class destroyer	Puget Sound Naval Shipyard	Bremerton, Washington	United States	
6 December	King	Farragut-class destroyer	Puget Sound Naval Shipyard	Bremerton, Washington	United States	
7 December	Leonardo da Vinci	Ocean liner	Ansaldo Shipyards	Genoa	Italy	For Italian Line
10 December	Packington	Ton-class minesweeper	Harland & Wolff	Belfast	United Kingdom	For Royal Navy.
11 December	Luce	Farragut-class destroyer	Fore River Shipyard	Quincy, Massachusetts	United States	
12 December	Manchester Miller	Cargo ship	Harland & Wolff	Belfast	United Kingdom	For Manchester Liners Ltd.
30 December	Rosebank	Cargo ship	Harland & Wolff	Belfast	United Kingdom	For Bank Line.
Unknown date	CBC 131	Barge	Alabama Drydock and Shipbuilding Company	Mobile, Alabama	United States	For Canal Barge Co. Inc. (1962).
Unknown date	Conservancy	Survey ship	Brooke Marine Ltd.	Lowestoft	United Kingdom	For Humber Conservancy Board.
Unknown date	Enterprise	Echo-class survey ship	M. W. Blackmore & Sons Ltd.	Bideford	United Kingdom	For Royal Navy.
Unknown date	Krabei Shell	Tug	J. Bolson & Son Ltd.	Poole	United Kingdom	For Sociètè Shell du Cambodge.
