= Suribachi-class ammunition ship =

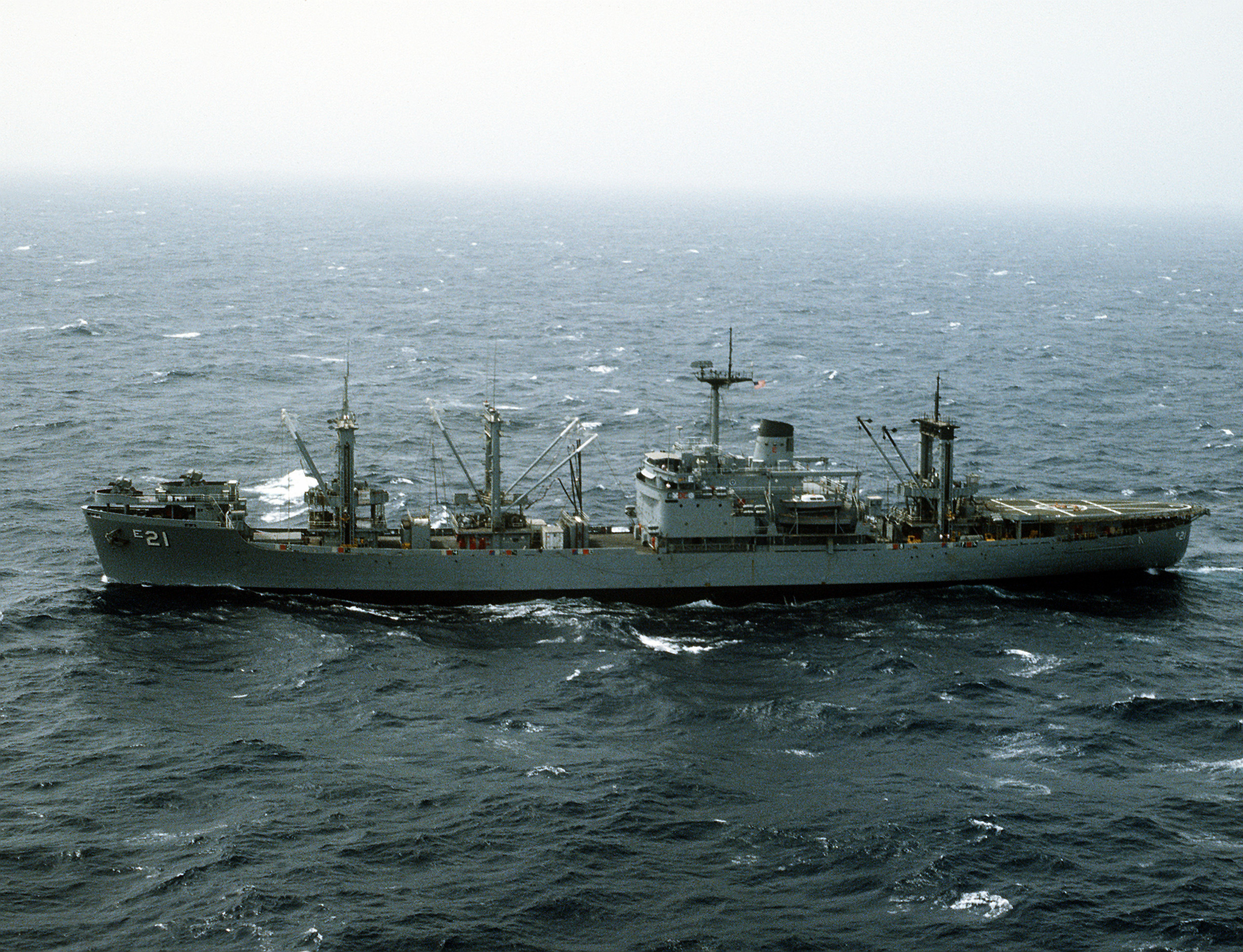
- USS Suribachi

Class overview
- Name: Suribachi class
- Builders: Bethlehem Sparrows Point Shipyard
- Operators: United States Navy
- Succeeded by: Nitro class
- Built: 1955–1957
- In commission: 1956–1995
- Completed: 2
- Retired: 2

General characteristics
- Type: Ammunition ship
- Tonnage: 7,500 DWT
- Displacement: 10,000 long tons (10,000 t) standard; 15,500 long tons (15,700 t) full
- Length: 512 ft (156 m)
- Beam: 72 ft (22 m)
- Draft: 29 ft (8.8 m)
- Propulsion: 2 × boilers; Steam turbines; Single shaft; 16,000 shp (11,931 kW)
- Speed: 21 knots (39 km/h; 24 mph)
- Complement: 312
- Armament: 4 × twin 3"/50 caliber guns
- Aviation facilities: Helicopter landing pad

The Suribachi-class ammunition ships was a class of two auxiliary vessels of the United States Navy in service from 1956 to 1995. They were among the first specialized underway replenishment ships built after World War II. The Nitro-class ammunition ships are sometimes considered part of this class. Both ships were decommissioned in the mid-1990s and were struck from the Naval Vessel Register in 1996. Both vessels were discarded in the 2000s.

== Description ==
The Suribachi class were the first ammunition ships specifically designed for underway replenishment for the United States Navy. The Suribachi class were designed by the Ship Characteristics Board as SCB 114. The ships had elevators installed to ease the internal handling of ammunition and explosives. Additionally as part of a refit in 1960s under SCB 232, the class had three holds converted to store missiles and were given high speed transfer systems for replenishment at sea.

The two ships had a light displacement of 7,470 long tons (7,590 t), a standard displacement of 10,000 long tons (10,000 t) and displaced 15,500 long tons (15,700 t) at full load. They measured 7,500 tons deadweight (DWT), 512 feet (156 m) long overall with a beam of 72 ft (22 m) and a draft of 29 ft (8.8 m). The vessels were powered by steam created by two Combustion Engineering boilers capable of 600 psi (42.2 kg/cm^{2}) at 752 °F (400 °C) powering two Bethlehem geared turbines turning one propeller creating 16,000 horsepower (12,000 kW). This gave the ships a maximum speed of 21 knots (39 km/h; 24 mph), but this later declined to 18 knots (33 km/h; 21 mph).

The Suribachi class were initially armed with four twin-mounted 3"/50 caliber guns placed in superfiring positions fore and aft. However, in the 1960s, the two aft mounts were removed and a landing pad for helicopters was installed in place. (Note: /50 refers to the length of the gun in terms of calibers. A /50 gun is 50 times long as its bore diameter.) The vessels mounted SPS-10 surface search radar and two Mk 36 SRBOC six-barrelled chaff launchers for electronic defense. They also had SPS-6 radar and Mark 63 Gun Fire Control System which were removed in 1977–1978. The vessels had a complement of 312 sailors including 18 officers.

== Units ==
Suribachi class construction data
Name	Number	Builder	Laid down	Launched	Commissioned	Fate	NVR
Suribachi	AE-21	Bethlehem Sparrows Point Shipyard	31 January 1955	2 November 1955	17 November 1956	Decommissioned 2 December 1994, sold for scrapping, 2009	AE-21
Mauna Kea	AE-22	Bethlehem Sparrows Point Shipyard	16 May 1955	3 May 1956	30 March 1957	Decommissioned 30 June 1995, sunk as target during RIMPAC, 12 July 2006	AE-22

== Construction and career ==
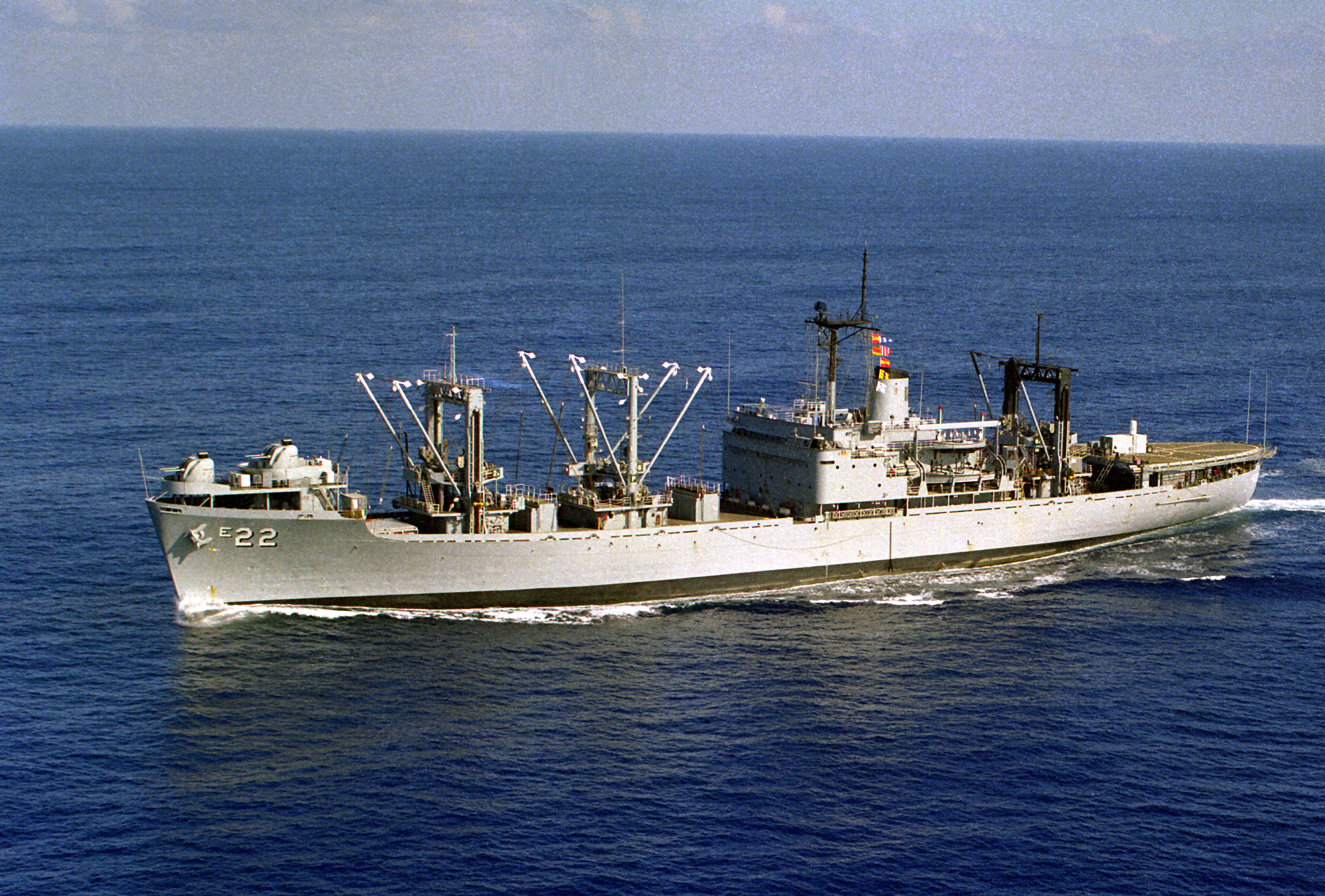
Mauna Kea in 1983

Two new purpose-built ammunition ships were authorized in 1954. As ammunition ships, the two vessels carry the names of volcanoes. The two vessels were constructed by the Bethlehem Steel Corporation at the Bethlehem Sparrows Point Shipyard in Maryland. Suribachi entered service in 1956, followed by Mauna Kea in 1957. The Nitro-class ammunition ships are often considered part of this class, but were built to an altered design. Mauna Kea was transferred to the reserve fleet in 1979. However, due to high operational requirements, Mauna Kea rejoined the active fleet in 1982. In 1986 Mauna Kea conducted trials using portable rails for the deployment of naval mines.

Suribachi was decommissioned in 1994, followed by Mauna Kea in 1995. Both ships were stricken from the Naval Vessel Register on 12 December 1996. Mauna Kea was used as target practice in fleet exercise in 2006, and Suribachi was scrapped at Brownsville, Texas in mid 2009.
