= USS Haleakala =

Ammunition ship of the United States Navy

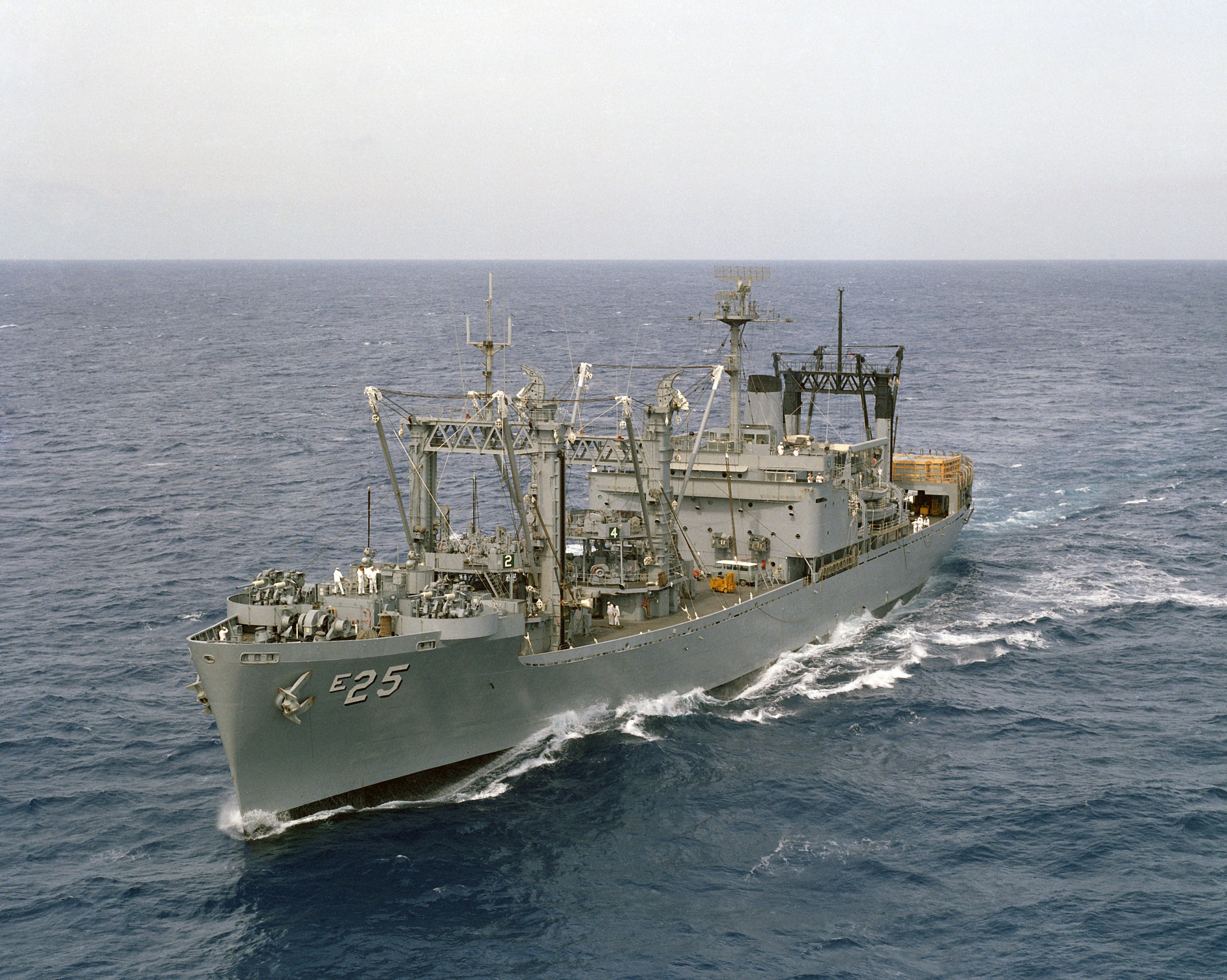
- USS Haleakala (AE-25) in April 1968

History

United States
- Name: USS Haleakala (AE-25)
- Namesake: Haleakala
- Awarded: 23 August 1956
- Builder: Bethlehem Shipbuilding Corporation
- Laid down: 3 February 1958
- Launched: 17 February 1959
- Acquired: 16 October 1959
- Commissioned: 3 November 1959
- Decommissioned: 10 December 1993
- Stricken: 10 December 1993
- Fate: Sold 28 March 1994
- Notes: Nitro, Pyro, Haleakala are all Nitro class and sister ships. Preceded by the Suribachi class and followed by the Kilauea class

General characteristics
- Class & type: Nitro-class ammunition ship
- Displacement: 8,300 tons
- Length: 512 ft (156 m)
- Beam: 72 ft (22 m)
- Draft: 29 ft (8.8 m)
- Speed: 20 knots
- Complement: 331
- Armament: 4 x 3 in (76 mm) guns

USS Haleakala (AE-25) was a Nitro-class ammunition ship of the United States Navy in service from 1959 to 1993.

The USS Haleakala (AE-25) was launched on 17 February 1959 by Bethlehem Shipbuilding Corporation in Baltimore, Maryland and was sponsored by Mrs. Maurice E. Curts, wife of Vice Admiral Maurice Curts. Haleakala was commissioned 3 November 1959.

After shakedown out of Guantanamo Bay Haleakala transited the Panama Canal and visited Chile and Costa Rica before arriving at San Francisco, 17 March 1960. The fifth of a new class of ammunition ships designed from the hull up for carrying and transferring at sea the latest in munitions and guided missiles, Haleakala spent the first part of April with Vega (AF-59) conducting replenishment exercises to test new equipment.

Haleakala departed San Francisco 7 July 1960 on her first Western Pacific deployment. Visiting Pearl Harbor, Yokosuka, and Sasebo, she provided services to various units of the 7th Fleet before returning to Port Chicago, California, 19 December 1960.

Haleakala departed on her second deployment to the Western Pacific 18 April 1961 and again serviced units of the 7th Fleet, returning to Port Chicago 8 September. In October, in company with Mount Katmai (AE-16), she steamed to Long Beach to participate in Exercise "Covered Wagon", an effort to test realistically a representative Attack Carrier Strike Force in all of its wartime tasks in the face of opposition similar to that which might be expected of a potential enemy.

Haleakala made two subsequent deployments to the Western Pacific between 29 May 1962 and February 1964. She arrived Todd Shipyards, Seattle, 25 February 1964 for overhaul and modernization to increase her efficiency and safety. With conversion completed by May 1965, through the fall of 1965 Haleakala participated in Operation Baseline. On 20 November she sailed for Yankee Station via Pearl Harbor to support combat operations in Vietnam, returning to Subic Bay 13 December.

Most of 1966 was spent on another Western Pacific deployment. Haleakala departed Subic Bay 23 August for the West Coast, arriving San Francisco 12 September. After training exercises off Mare Island through December, Haleakala returned for further replenishment operations off Vietnam into 1967.

On August 27, 1969, the ship experienced a catastrophic flare back, in no.2 boiler, which also knocked out no.1 boiler, stopping the ship dead in the water.[1] The next day a harbor tug YTB 779, towed the Haleakala to Da Nang, South Vietnam.[2] On the 29th the fleet tug USS Cocopa, began to tow her to Subic Bay.[3] Then on the 30th she broke tow and steamed into Subic Bay under her own power, after no.1 boiler was repaired.[4] Haleakala stayed in Subic Bay for the next two months, until both boilers were repaired, and sea trials began on October 30.[5]

Haleakala was decommissioned on December 10, 1993.
