= USS Mauna Kea =

Ammunition ship of the United States Navy

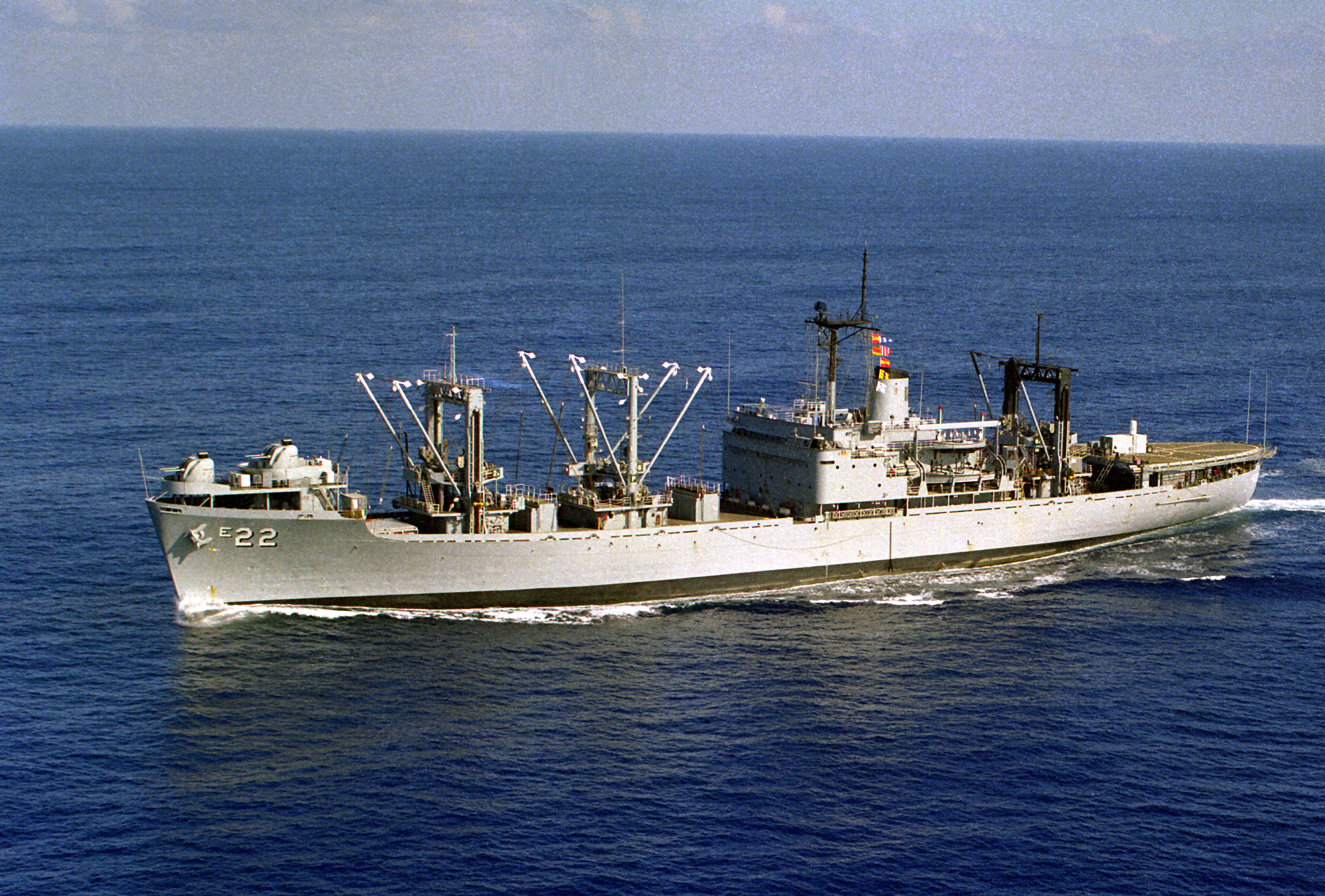
- USS Mauna Kea (AE-22)

History

United States
- Name: USS Mauna Kea
- Namesake: Mauna Kea
- Laid down: 6 May 1955
- Launched: 3 May 1956
- Commissioned: 30 March 1957
- Decommissioned: 30 June 1995
- Stricken: 12 December 1996
- Home port: Concord Naval weapons station.
- Fate: Sunk as target during RIMPAC, 12 July 2006

General characteristics
- Class & type: Suribachi-class ammunition ship
- Tonnage: 50 short tons
- Displacement: 9,758 long tons (9,915 t) light; 15,688 long tons (15,940 t) full
- Length: 511 ft (156 m)
- Beam: 72 ft
- Draft: 28 ft
- Propulsion: 2 × boilers; steam turbines; single shaft; 16,000 shp
- Speed: 20 knots (37 km/h)
- Complement: 23 officers; 324 enlisted
- Armament: 4 × twin 3 in (76 mm) 50 caliber guns

USS Mauna Kea (AE-22) was a Suribachi-class ammunition ship of the United States Navy that was laid down at the Bethlehem-Sparrows Point Shipyard Inc., Sparrows Point, Maryland, on 6 May 1955; launched on 3 May 1956; sponsored by Mrs. Charles R. Brown; and commissioned on 30 March 1957, Captain Kenneth Loveland in command. The ship was decommissioned 30 June 1995 with over 38 years of active service. Mauna Kea was the oldest active ship in the Navy for a single week (USS Jason having been decommissioned on June 24) prior to being decommissioned.

== Service history ==
=== 1957–1965 ===
Following shakedown, Mauna Kea, designed for rapid replenishment of ammunition at sea, reported for duty with ServRon 1 in the eastern Pacific. Into the fall of 1957 she serviced the 1st Fleet and in November made preparations for her first WestPac deployment. Sailing west, she reported to SevRon 3 at Sasebo, Japan, in December and commenced distributing the bullets of "beans, bullets, and black oil" to the ships of the 7th Fleet. From that time until 1965, she rotated between duties with the above‑noted service squadrons, participating while with the 7th Fleet, in SEATO exercises and in joint exercises with Korean, Japanese, and Chinese Nationalist Forces.

=== 1965–1970 ===
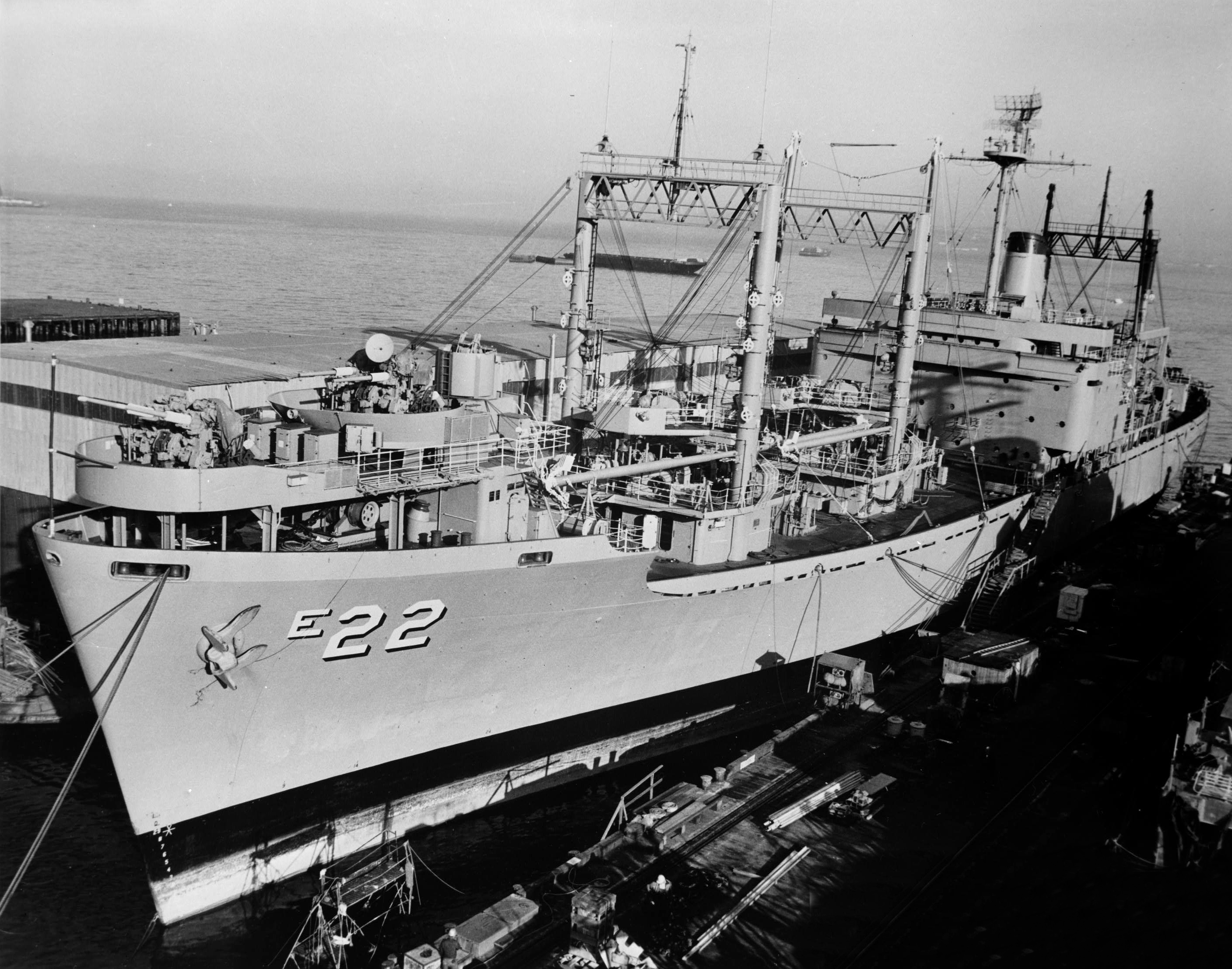
AE-22 at the PUGET SOUND BRIDGE & DRY DOCK CO. 2 March 1965 (US National Archives and Records Administration)

On 28 February 1965, the ammunition ship arrived at the Lockheed Shipbuilding and Construction Company yards, Seattle, Washington. There having reverted to in commission in Reserve status, Mauna Kea commenced FAST (Fast Automatic Shuttle Transfer System) conversion. Completion of this conversion, which would enable her to transfer a missile from her hold to the magazine of a missile‑firing ship in 90 seconds and allow her greater versatility in servicing the fleet with the addition of a helipad for vertical replenishment capabilities, was delayed for 8 months, because of strikes and lack of necessary parts, until June 1966. Then followed a fitting out period and intensive post-conversion shakedown exercises, which continued into the fall. By November she was again an active unit of the Pacific Fleet's Service Force and on 28 December she departed her home port of Concord, California, for her ninth WestPac deployment.

Traveling westward, Mauna Kea arrived at Subic Bay, Philippines, 9 January 1967 to join ServRon 7. Four days later she departed Subic Bay for her first trip to the line off Vietnam. For the next six months she rearmed carrier groups on Yankee Station and cruisers and destroyers off South Vietnam. At the end of July, she headed north to Japan for a brief visit at Yokosuka before getting underway for California. Arriving at Concord, 22 August, she underwent availability and then commenced participation in fleet and local exercises along the California coast.

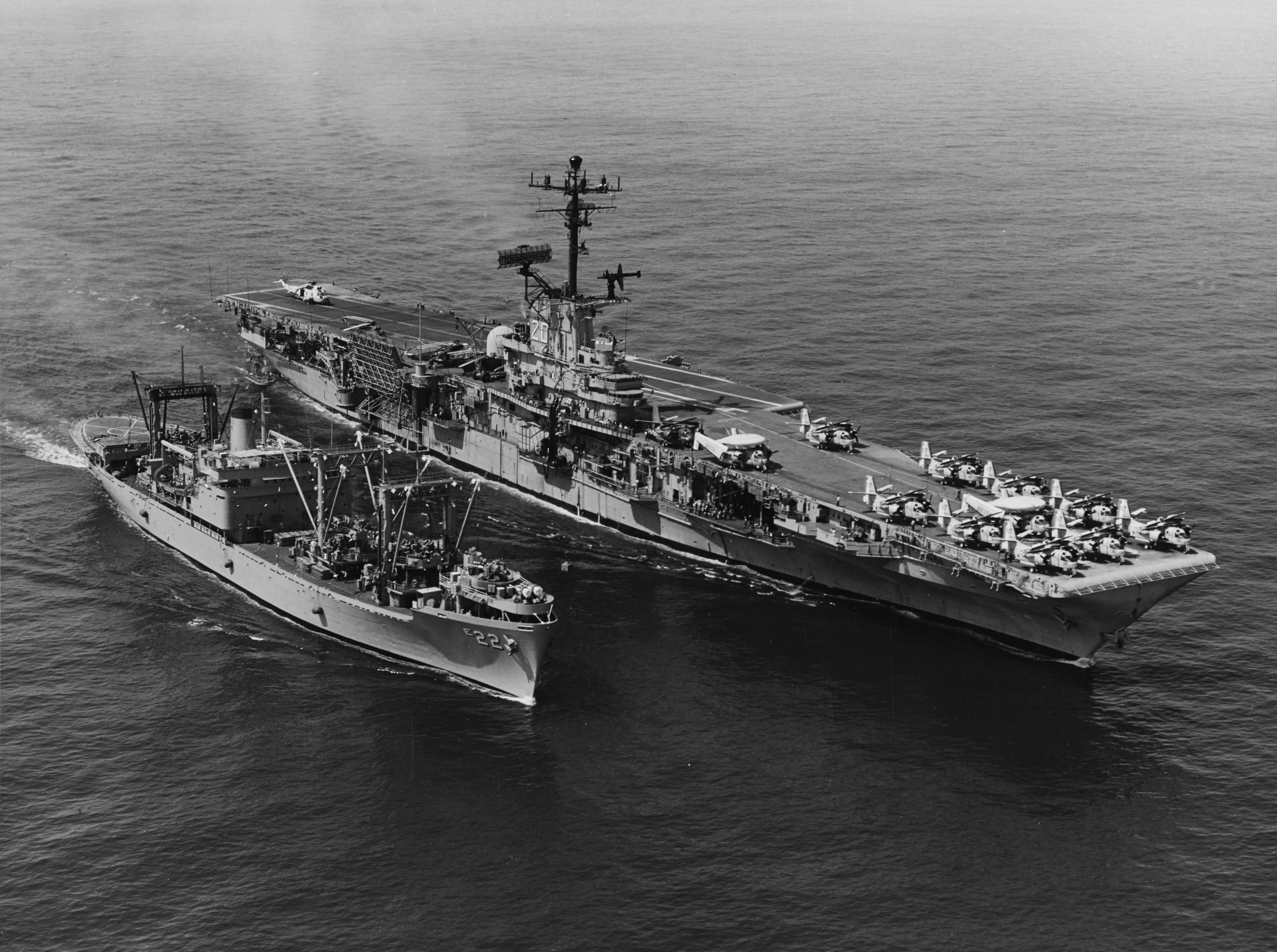
Mauna Kea replenishing USS Bennington in the Gulf of Tonkin, September 1968

On 20 February 1968, Mauna Kea departed the Naval Weapons Station, Mare Island Annex, Vallejo, California for a WESTPAC deployment. Mauna Kea performed munitions underway replenishment (UNREP) operations to units of the 7th Fleet in the South China Sea and Gulf of Tonkin off the coast of South Vietnam. With the exception of UNREP operations at Subic Bay and a port visit to Hong Kong, Mauna Kea conducted these operations in direct support of combat operations from 14 March 1968 to 25 September 1968. During the period of 15 to 16 May 1968, Mauna Kea anchored at Anchorage #13 in Da Nang Harbor, with no disposition. On 17 May 1968, the USS Mauna Kea departed the Gulf of Tonkin en route to Subic Bay, arriving 18 May 1968. The ship visited Hong Kong during the period of 10 to 15 June 1968. Mauna Kea departed Yankee Station on 26 September to return to her homeport, Concord, California, arriving on 14 October 1968.

Afterwards she, through the end of 1970, continued servicing the 1st Fleet until setting out for the western Pacific and another tour with the 7th Fleet.

=== 1969–1995 ===
1987-1989 homeport Between 1971 and 1973, USS Mauna KEA (AE-22) was hit by a mine and was repaired at Sasebo, Japan.

On Jan 15, 1973, in the South China Sea a forklift driver aboard ship reported a UFO hovering nearby during an ammunition transfer

=== Decommissioning and disposal ===
Mauna Kea was decommissioned on 30 June 1995, and struck from the Navy list on 12 December 1996. On 18 December 1998, she was transferred to the Maritime Administration as part of the National Defense Reserve Fleet at Suisun Bay, California. The ship was finally sunk as a target during RIMPAC 2006 off the coast of Kauai, Hawaii, on 12 July 2006.

Preceded by USS Jason (AR-8)	Oldest active ship of the United States Navy; 1995	Succeeded by USS Independence (CV-62)
