= Nitro-class ammunition ship =

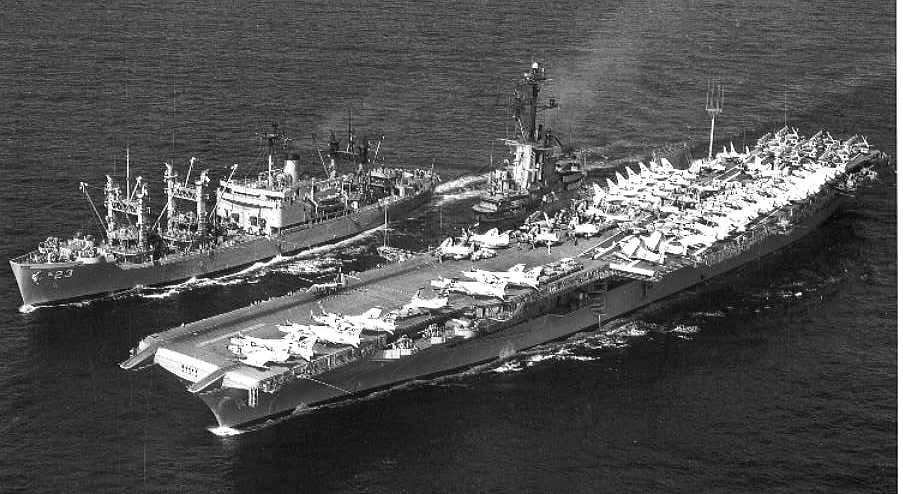
- USS Nitro (left) replenishing the USS Intrepid in the early 1960s

Class overview
- Preceded by: Mount Hood class
- Succeeded by: Kilauea class
- Planned: 4
- Completed: 3
- Canceled: 1
- Laid up: 3
- Retired: 1993-1995

General characteristics
- Type: Ammunition carrier
- Displacement: 9,050 tons (light), 15,489 tons (Full)
- Length: 512 ft (Overall)
- Beam: 72 ft
- Draught: 29 ft
- Propulsion: 1 shaft; geared steam turbine; 16,000 shp
- Speed: 21 kn
- Armour: none

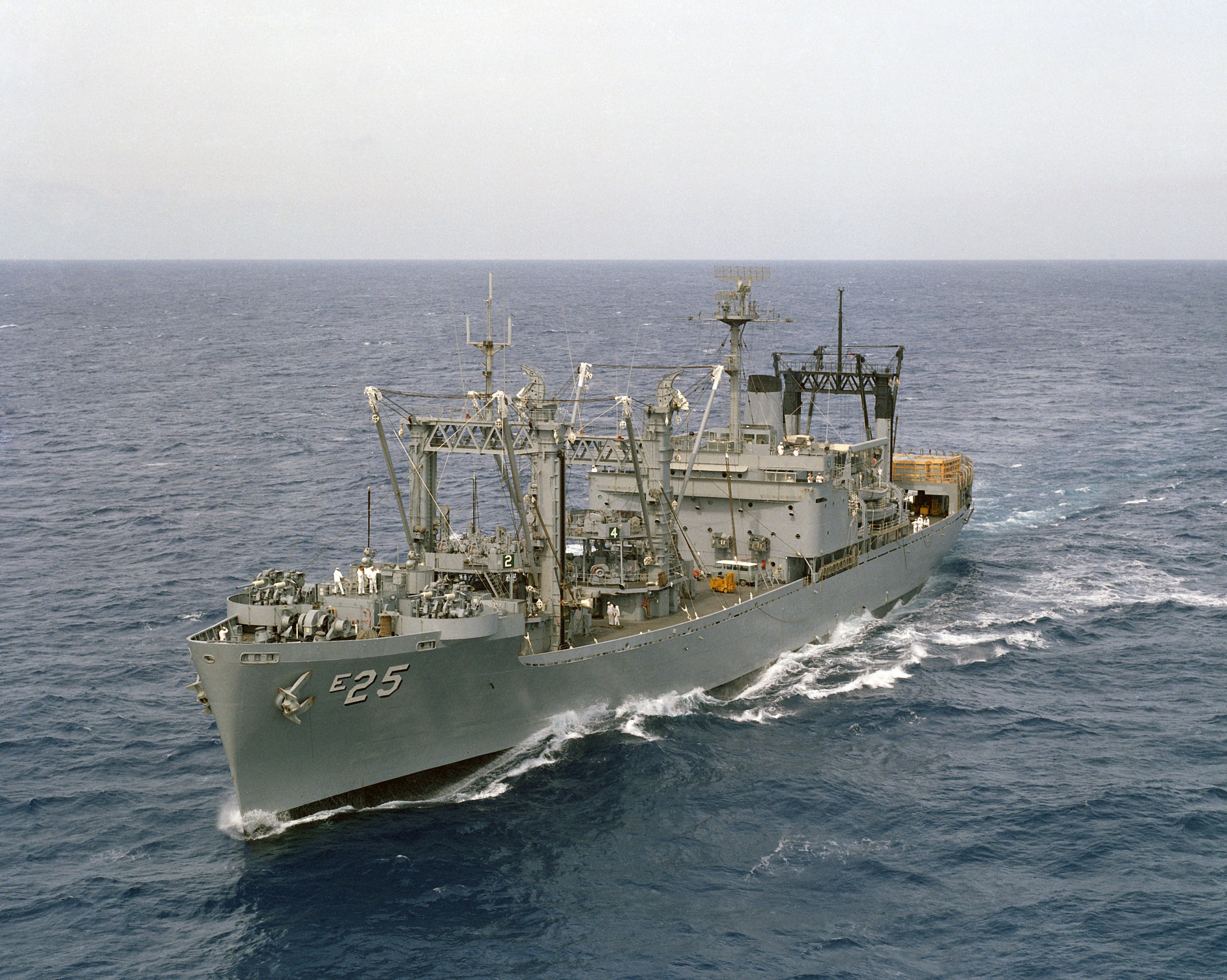
USS Haleakala (AE-25) in April 1968

The Nitro-class ammunition ships are a class of three auxiliary vessels of the United States Navy. Launched in 1958-1959, they were among the first specialized underway replenishment ships built after the Second World War, to carry munitions. These and the Suribachi-class ammunition ships are sometimes considered to form a single class. A fourth ship of the class was planned under the 1959 military construction program but was eventually cancelled before construction began. Soon after completion, all ships of the class were modified to stow surface to air missiles as large as the RIM-8 Talos in their holds. Initially ships of the Nitro class were armed with eight 3"/50 caliber guns in Mk 33 twin mounts. Two Mk 33 mounts were located on the forecastle and another two were located near the stern. During the mid-1960s all ships of the class had the two Mk 33 mounts near the stern replaced with a helicopter landing pad. This allowed each ship to utilize helicopters during replenishment operations.

The Nitros were decommissioned in 1993-1995 following the end of the Cold War and have been scrapped.

== Ships in class ==
- USS Nitro (AE-23)
- USS Pyro (AE-24)
- USS Haleakala (AE-25)
