= USS Independence (CV-62) =

United States Navy aircraft carrier (1959–1998)

Coordinates: 26.1034852°N 97.1689342°W

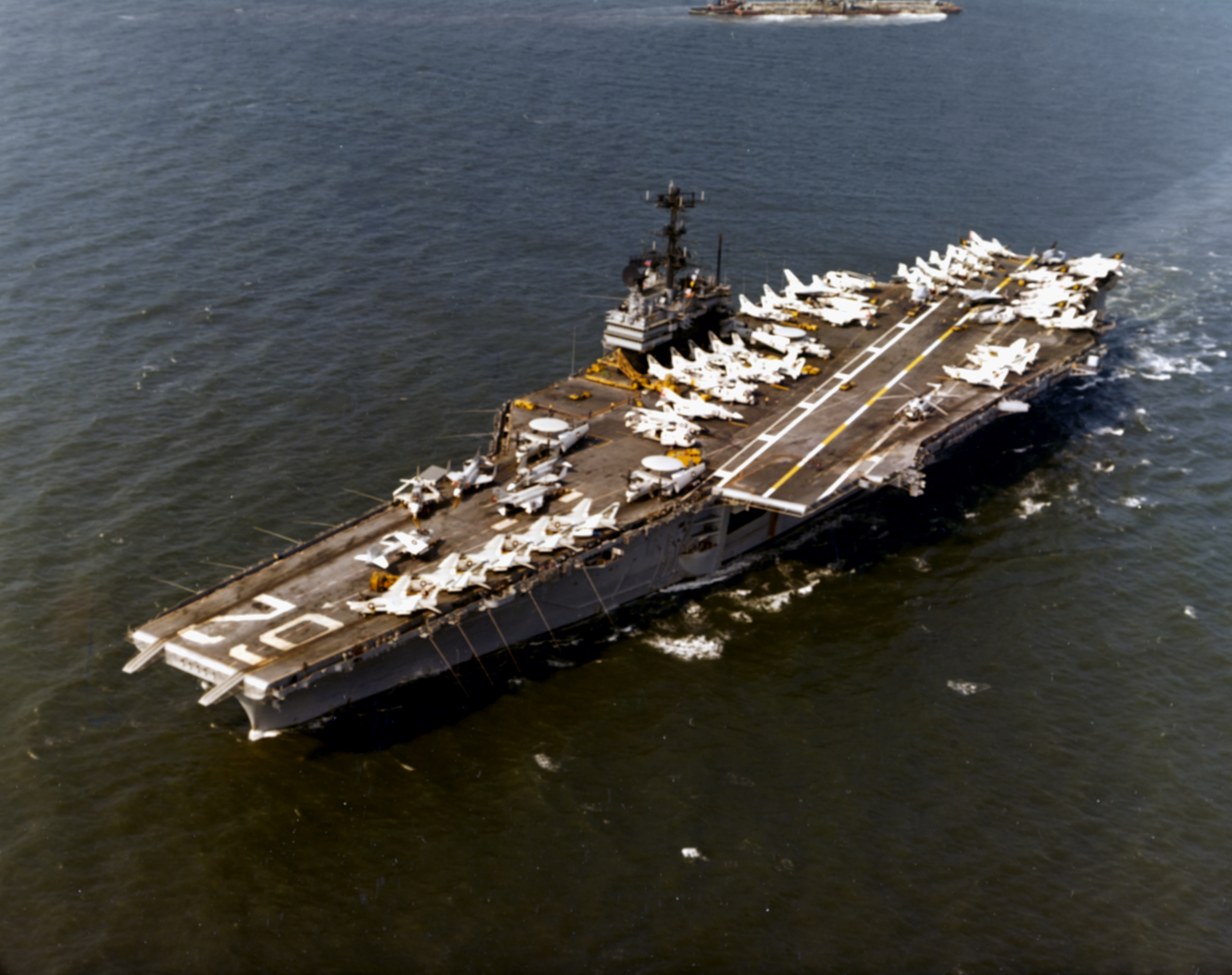
- USS Independence in 1971

History

United States
- Name: Independence
- Namesake: Independence
- Ordered: 2 July 1954
- Builder: New York Navy Yard
- Cost: $182.3 million
- Laid down: 1 July 1955
- Launched: 6 June 1958
- Acquired: 3 April 1959
- Commissioned: 10 January 1959
- Decommissioned: 30 September 1998
- Reclassified: CV-62, 28 February 1973
- Stricken: 8 March 2004
- Identification: Callsign: NNQN; Hull number: CVA-62
- Motto: Freedom's Flagship
- Nickname(s): Indy
- Fate: Scrapped, 1 February 2019
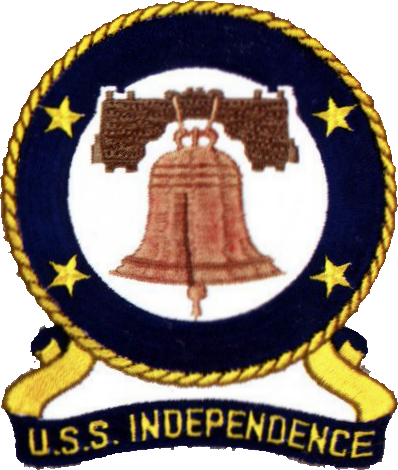
- Badge

General characteristics
- Class & type: Forrestal-class aircraft carrier
- Displacement: 60,000 long tons (61,000 t) standard; 80,643 long tons (81,937 t) full load
- Length: 1,070 ft (326.1 m)
- Beam: 130.0 ft (39.63 m) waterline; 270 ft (82.3 m) extreme
- Draft: 37 ft (11.3 m)
- Propulsion: 4 Westinghouse geared turbines, four shafts, 280,000 shaft horsepower (210,000 kW); 8 Babcock & Wilcox boilers
- Speed: 34 knots (63 km/h; 39 mph)
- Range: 8,000 nautical miles (15,000 km) at 20 knots (37 km/h); 4,000 nautical miles (7,400 km) at 30 knots (56 km/h)
- Complement: 3,126 (ship's crew) plus; 2,089 (air wing) plus; 70 (flag staff) plus; 72 (Marines)
- Sensors & processing systems: AN/SPS-48C 3D air search radar; AN/SPS-49(V5) 2D air search radar; AN/SPS-67(V1) surface search radar; AN/SPS-64 navigation radar; Mk 91 Missile fire-control radar
- Electronic warfare & decoys: AN/SLQ-29; Mark 36 SRBOC decoy rocket launcher
- Armament: 8 × 5"/54 caliber Mark 42 guns (127 mm); 2× 8 NATO Sea Sparrow; 3× Phalanx CIWS
- Armor: Belt: 6 in (152 mm); Flight deck: 3 in (76 mm); Torpedo Bulkheads: 3 in (76 mm)
- Aircraft carried: 70–90; Typical air group in the late 1990s: 14 F-14 Tomcat, 36 F/A-18 Hornet, 4 EA-6B Prowler, 4 E-2C Hawkeye, 8 S-3/ES-3 Viking, 3 SH-60F Seahawk, 2 HH-60 Seahawk

The fifth USS Independence (CV/CVA-62) was an aircraft carrier of the United States Navy. She was the fourth and final member of the Forrestal class of conventionally powered supercarriers. She entered service in 1959, with much of her early years spent in the Mediterranean Fleet.

Independence was decommissioned in 1998 after 39 years of active service. After 19 years stored at Puget Sound Naval Shipyard, Bremerton, Washington, it was towed to Brownsville, Texas in 2017 with scrapping completed by early 2019.

== Design and construction ==
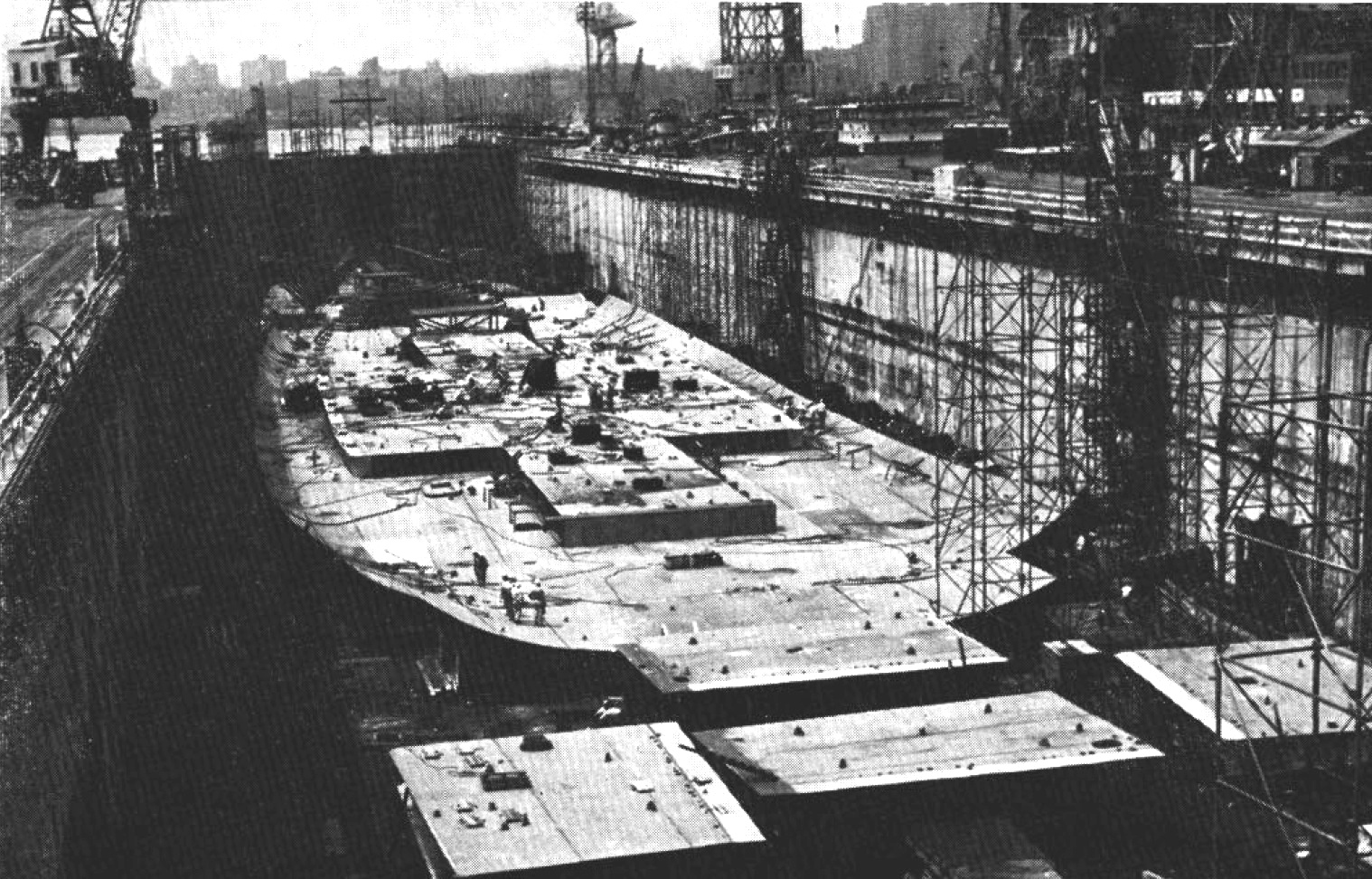
Independence under construction at the Brooklyn Navy Yard in 1955

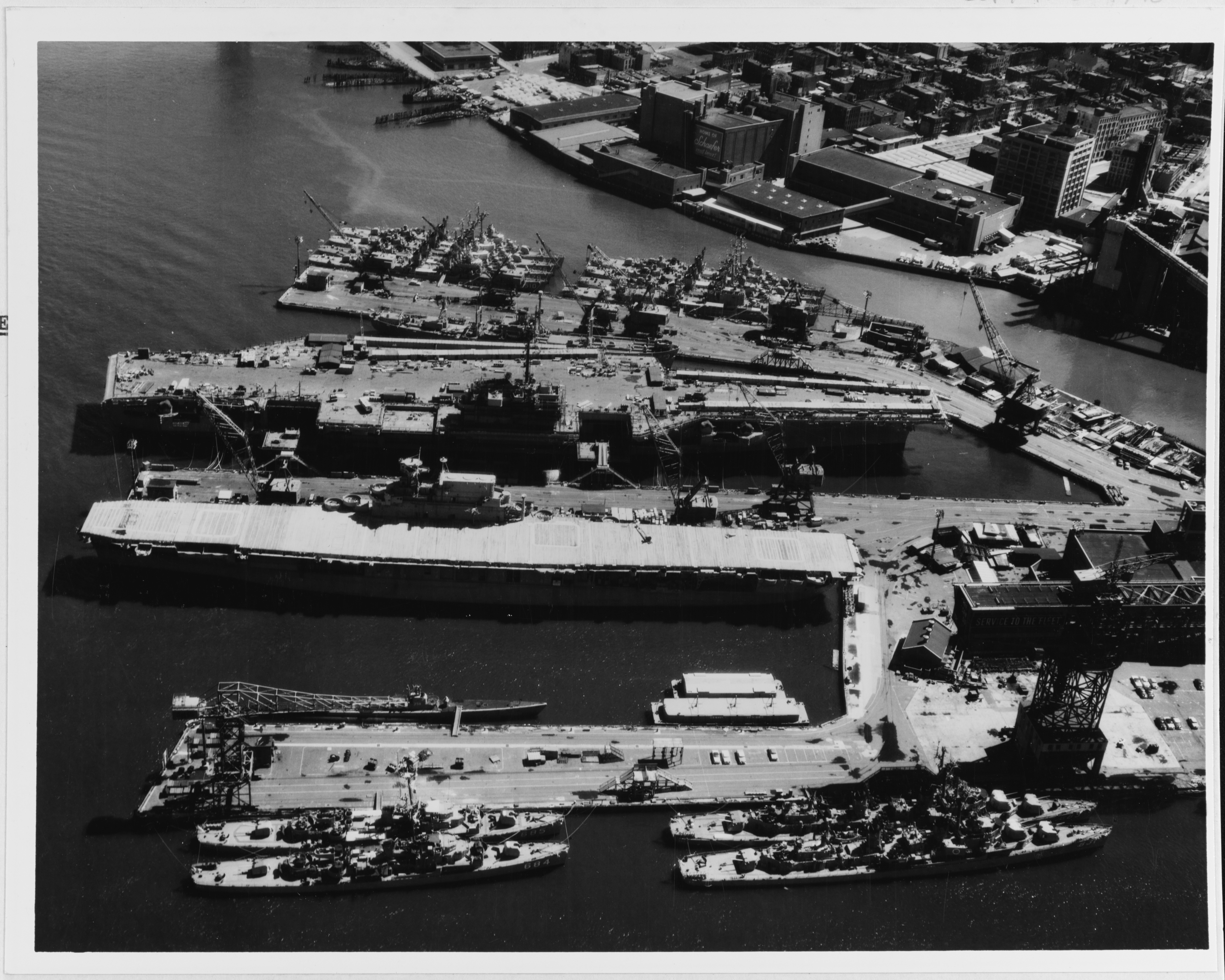
Independence fitting out at the Brooklyn Navy Yard in June 1958; Enterprise (CV-6) is opposite awaiting disposal

The Forrestal-class aircraft carriers were designed in the early 1950s as a smaller version of the cancelled United States-class "supercarriers". Unlike the United States class, they were to operate in both the nuclear strike and conventional roles, and were therefore intended to carry a mixed fleet of fighters, light attack and heavy attack aircraft, all of which were to be jets. The carriers were designed around the large new Douglas A3D Skywarrior bomber, with four deck-edge aircraft elevators large enough to handle the new bomber. As jet aircraft needed much more fuel than piston-engined aircraft, the Forrestal class had a much greater aviation fuel capacity than existing carriers, with 750,000 US gallons (2,800,000 L) of Avgas and 789,000 US gallons (2,990,000 L) of jet fuel, more than double that carried in the Midway-class aircraft carriers.

Independence was built with an angled flight deck with four C-7 steam catapults, two on the bow and two on the angled deck. She was fitted with AN/SPS-37 long-range search radar and AN/SPS-8B height finding radar. Defensive armament consisted of eight 5"/54 caliber Mark 42 guns mounted on sponsons jutting out from the sides of the ship so they did not interfere with the flight deck. The initial air wing of the Forrestal-class carriers was about 90 aircraft, although this varied with the composition of the airwing.

The contract to build Independence, the fourth Forrestal-class carrier was awarded to the Brooklyn Navy Yard on 2 July 1954, with the ship being laid down on 1 July 1955. Independence was constructed in Drydock 6 at the New York Naval Shipyard in Brooklyn, New York. During early construction, the ship was positioned with her stern at the head of the drydock to facilitate delivery of materials via a truck ramp leading from the head of the dock to the hangar deck at the stern. The island and associated sponson were deliberately not installed during this phase in order to avoid obstructing the yard's large traveling crane.

In August 1957, while approximately 65 percent complete, Independence was transferred from Drydock 6 to Drydock 5 within the shipyard to allow completion of flight deck work using facilities available at that location. Contemporary accounts described the transfer as an "extraordinarily complex job" that was accomplished smoothly and efficiently. She was launched on 6 June 1958 by the wife of Thomas S. Gates, the Secretary of the Navy, and commissioned on 10 January 1959.

== Operational history ==
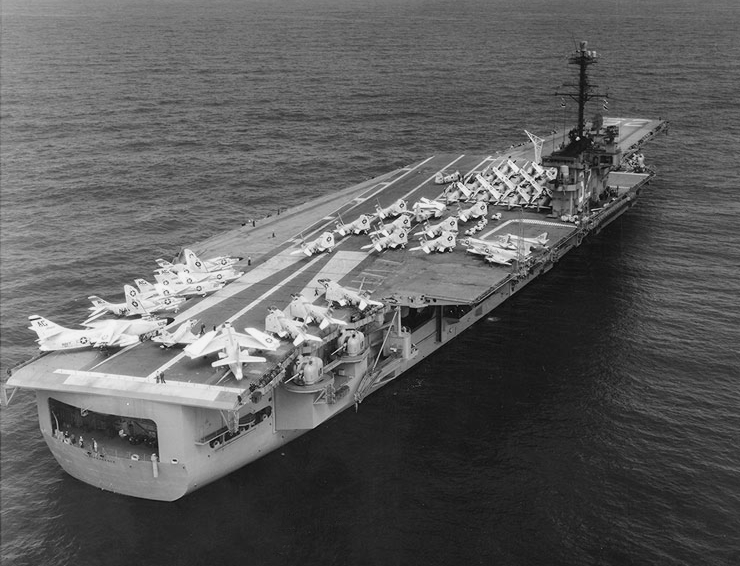
Independence on her initial shakedown in 1959

=== Testing and workup ===
Independence conducted shakedown training under her first captain, Captain R. Y. McElroy, with the first landing-on being carried out by a Grumman Trader carrier onboard delivery aircraft on 2 March 1959. She arrived at her new home port of Naval Station Norfolk, Virginia on 30 June 1959, and then carried out a ten-week training cruise in the Caribbean. During these trials, while carrying out compatibility tests aboard the new carrier, a Douglas A3D Skywarrior was catapulted off Independence at a gross weight of 84,000 pounds (38,000 kg), the heaviest aircraft to take off from a carrier at the time.

=== 1960–1964 ===
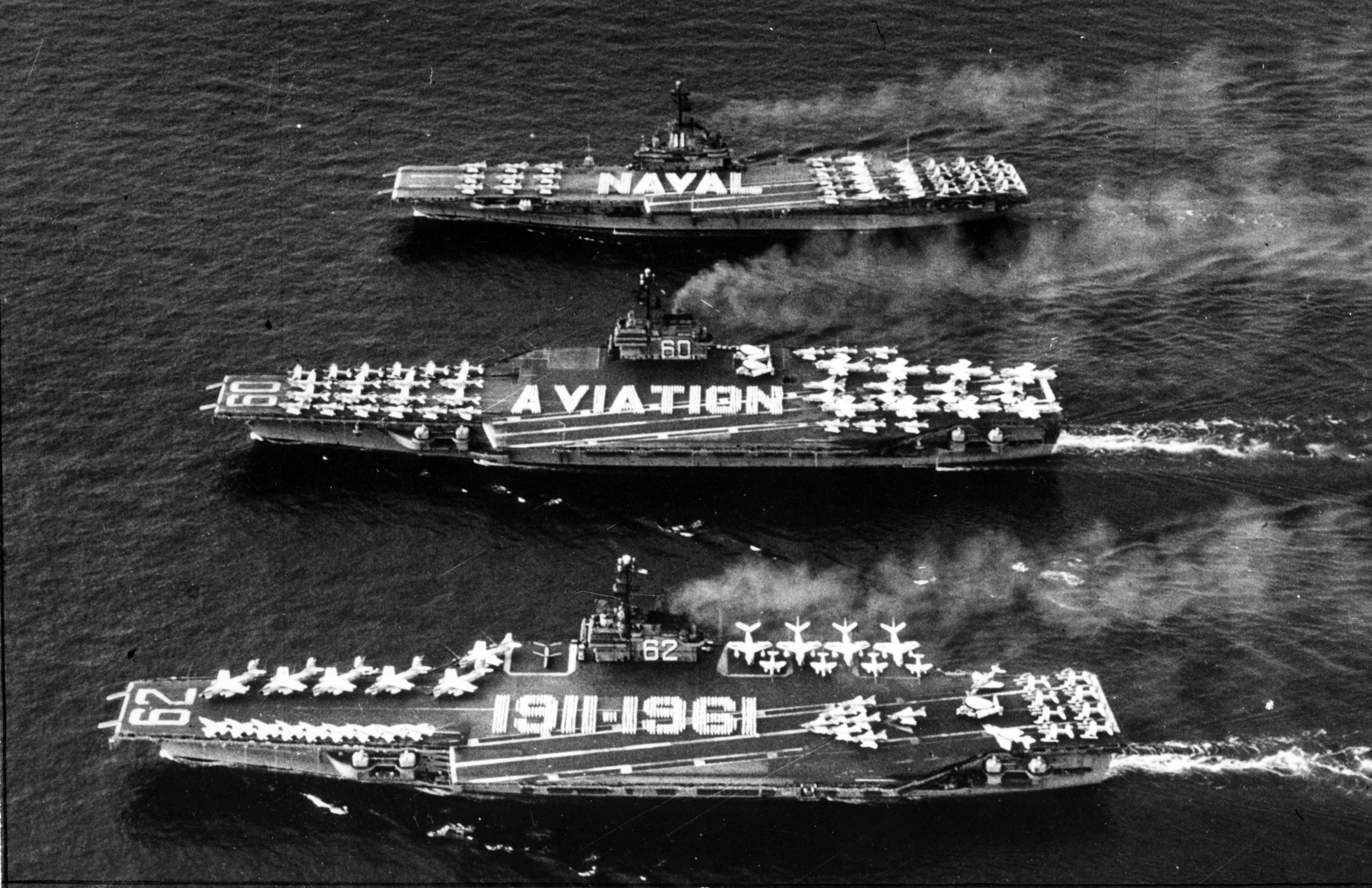
Independence (foreground) alongside her sister ship Saratoga and Intrepid in 1961

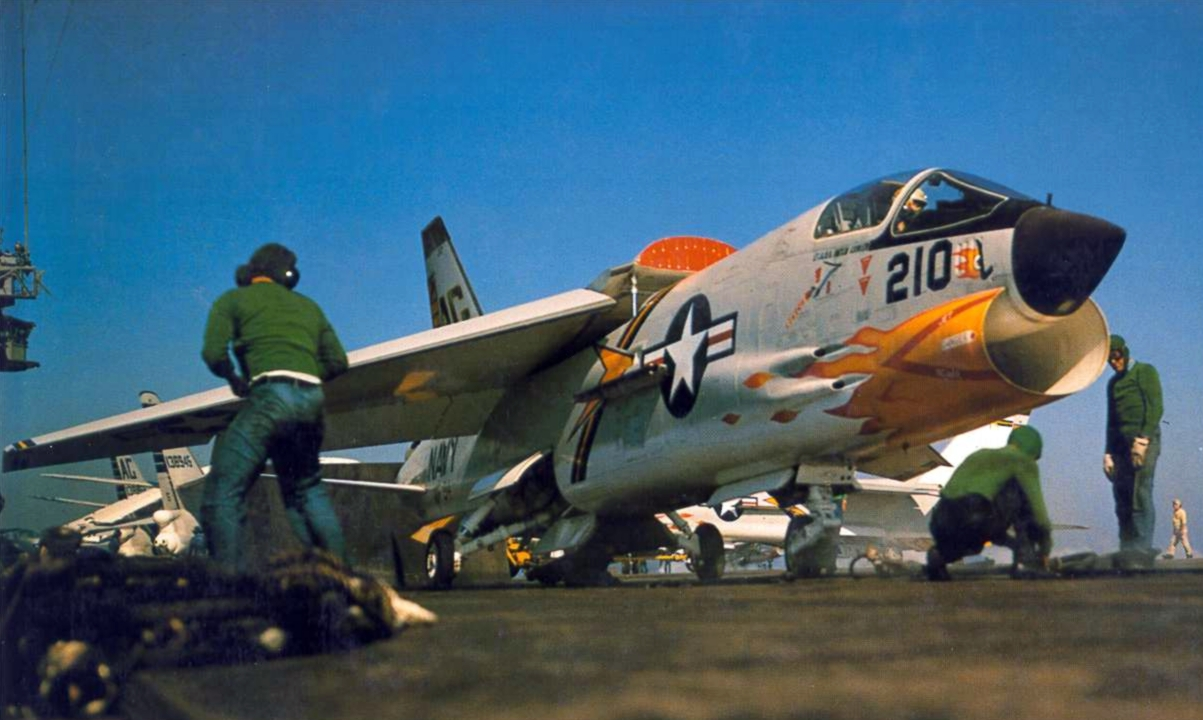
An F-8C ready to launch from Independence during her 1963-1964 Mediterranean cruise

Independence operated off the Virginia Capes for the next year on training maneuvers, and departed 4 August 1960 for her first cruise to the Mediterranean. There, she added to the power of the 6th Fleet in the region, remaining in the eastern Mediterranean until her return to Norfolk 3 March 1961. On 4 August 1961, she departed again for the Mediterranean to join the US 6th fleet for another cruise and returned on 19 December 1961 to Norfolk.

Independence sailed on 19 April 1962 for Sixth Fleet duty in support of President John F. Kennedy's firm stand on Berlin during a recurrence of stress in a critical area. She returned to Norfolk 27 August and sailed 11 October for the Caribbean Sea. Called on by President Kennedy on 24 October during the 1962 Cuban Missile Crisis, Independence acted as a key participant in the U.S. naval blockade of Cuba. She arrived off Puerto Rico in response to the presence of Soviet missiles in Cuba and took part in the quarantine operations until the resolution of the crisis. She then returned to Norfolk on 25 November for readiness exercises along the eastern seaboard, overhaul in the Norfolk Naval Shipyard, and refresher training out of Guantanamo Bay.

Independence departed Norfolk on 6 August 1963 to take part in combined readiness exercises in the Bay of Biscay with sea-air units of the United Kingdom and France then entered the Mediterranean on 21 August for further duty with the Sixth Fleet. Cruising throughout the Mediterranean, she gained much valuable experience during combined NATO exercises, including close air support to Turkish paratroops, reconnaissance, communications, and convoy strike support. President Makarios of Cyprus paid her a visit on 7 October 1963, after which she took part in bilateral U.S.-Italian exercises in the Adriatic with Italian patrol torpedo boats, and U.S.-French exercises, which pitted her aircraft against French interceptors and a surface action with the French cruiser Colbert. She returned to Norfolk on 4 March 1964.

Following training exercises, ranging north to New York and south to Naval Station Mayport, Florida, Independence departed Norfolk on 8 September 1964 for NATO Teamwork exercises in the Norwegian Sea and off the coast of France, and then proceeded to Gibraltar. She returned to Norfolk 5 November 1964 and entered the Norfolk Naval Shipyard for overhaul.

=== 1965–1970 ===
On May 10, 1965, Independence deployed for more than seven months, including 100 days in the South China Sea, off the coast of Vietnam, the first Atlantic Fleet carrier to do so. She also was the fifth U.S. carrier to operate off Vietnam. Independence and her embarked Carrier Air Wing 7 received the Navy Unit Commendation for exceptionally meritorious service from 5 June to 21 November 1965. The carrier's air group participated in the first major series of coordinated strikes against enemy supply lines north of the Hanoi-Haiphong complex, evading the first massive surface-to-air missile barrage in aviation history while attacking assigned targets, and executing the first successful attack on an enemy surface-to-air missile installation. The carrier launched more than 7,000 sorties, performing strike operations against military and logistic supply facilities in North Vietnam. "The superior team spirit, courage, professional competence, and devotion to duty displayed by the officers and men of Independence and embarked Attack Carrier Air Wing Seven reflect great credit upon themselves and the United States Naval Service."

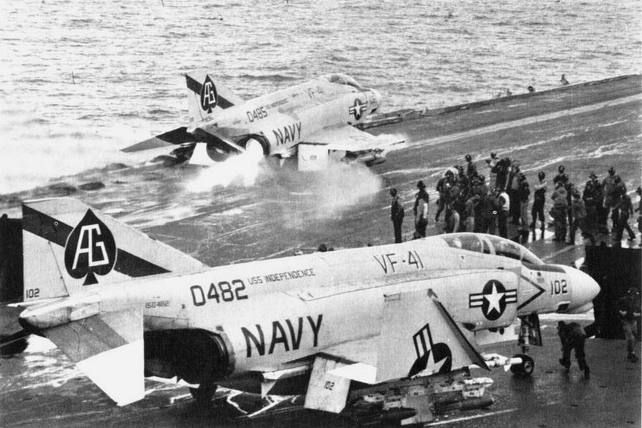
F-4Bs launching from Independence during her 1965 deployment to Vietnam

Independence returned to her homeport, Norfolk, arriving 13 December 1965. During the first half of 1966, she operated off Norfolk, replenishing and training air groups. On 4 May 1966, she participated in Operation Strikex. The carrier departed Norfolk 13 June for European operations with the Sixth Fleet. Independence was involved with unit and NATO exercises from July into December. She then continued her Sixth Fleet deployment returning to CONUS in early 1967. After a few months of local operations, she underwent an extensive overhaul at the Norfolk Naval Shipyard. The drydock portion of the overhaul was interrupted when Independence had to leave drydock early to make way for the fire-damaged Forrestal on 19 September 1967.

On 30 April 1968, Independence steamed to the Mediterranean Sea for a nine-month deployment. She returned to Pier 12 NOB Norfolk, Virginia on 27 January 1969. On 3 September 1969, the Independence departed Norfolk to participate in NATO exercises in the North Atlantic, (NORLANT), where she participated in testing the Hawker Siddeley Harrier in flight deck operations, returning home on 9 October 1969. Independence was again deployed to the Mediterranean on 23 June 1970, returning to Pier 12 on 31 January 1971. It was during this cruise that the ship was awarded the Meritorious Unit Commendation in support of actions against the PLO during the Jordanian crisis.

=== 1970–1979 ===
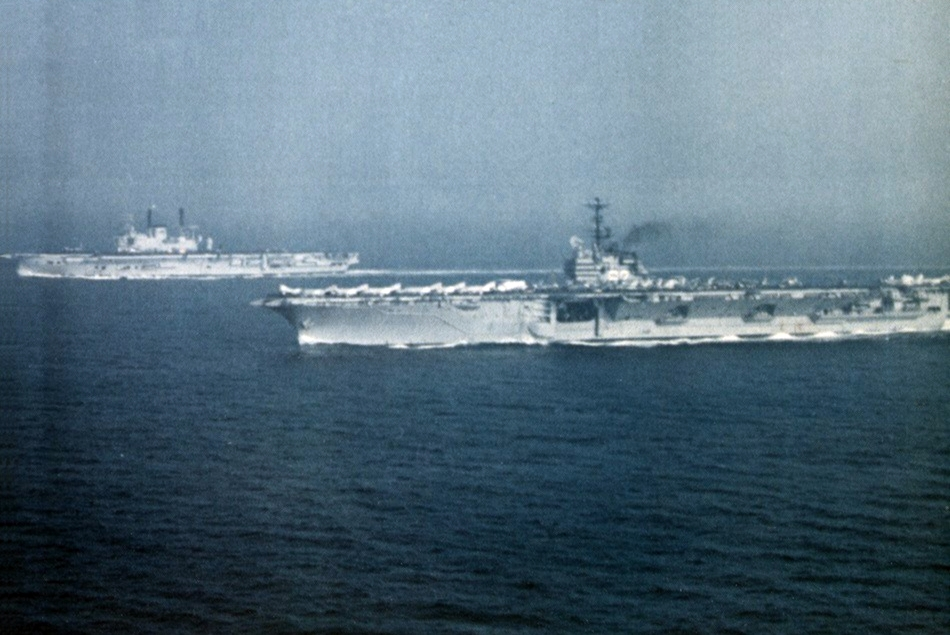
Independence (foreground) operating with HMS Ark Royal in the North Atlantic in 1971

On 25 September 1970, the news was received that Gamal Abdel Nasser, President of the United Arab Republic had died; an event that might plunge the Middle East into a crisis. Independence, along with John F. Kennedy, Saratoga, and seven other U.S. Navy ships, were put on standby in case U.S. military protection was needed for the evacuation of U.S. citizens and as a counterbalance to the Soviet Union's Mediterranean fleet.

Pilots of VMA-142, -131 and -133 began qualification landings in A-4 Skyhawks aboard Independence on 3 August 1971. For the next three days, four active duty and 20 reserve pilots operated aboard the carrier —the first time that Marine Corps Reserve squadrons qualified in carrier duty.

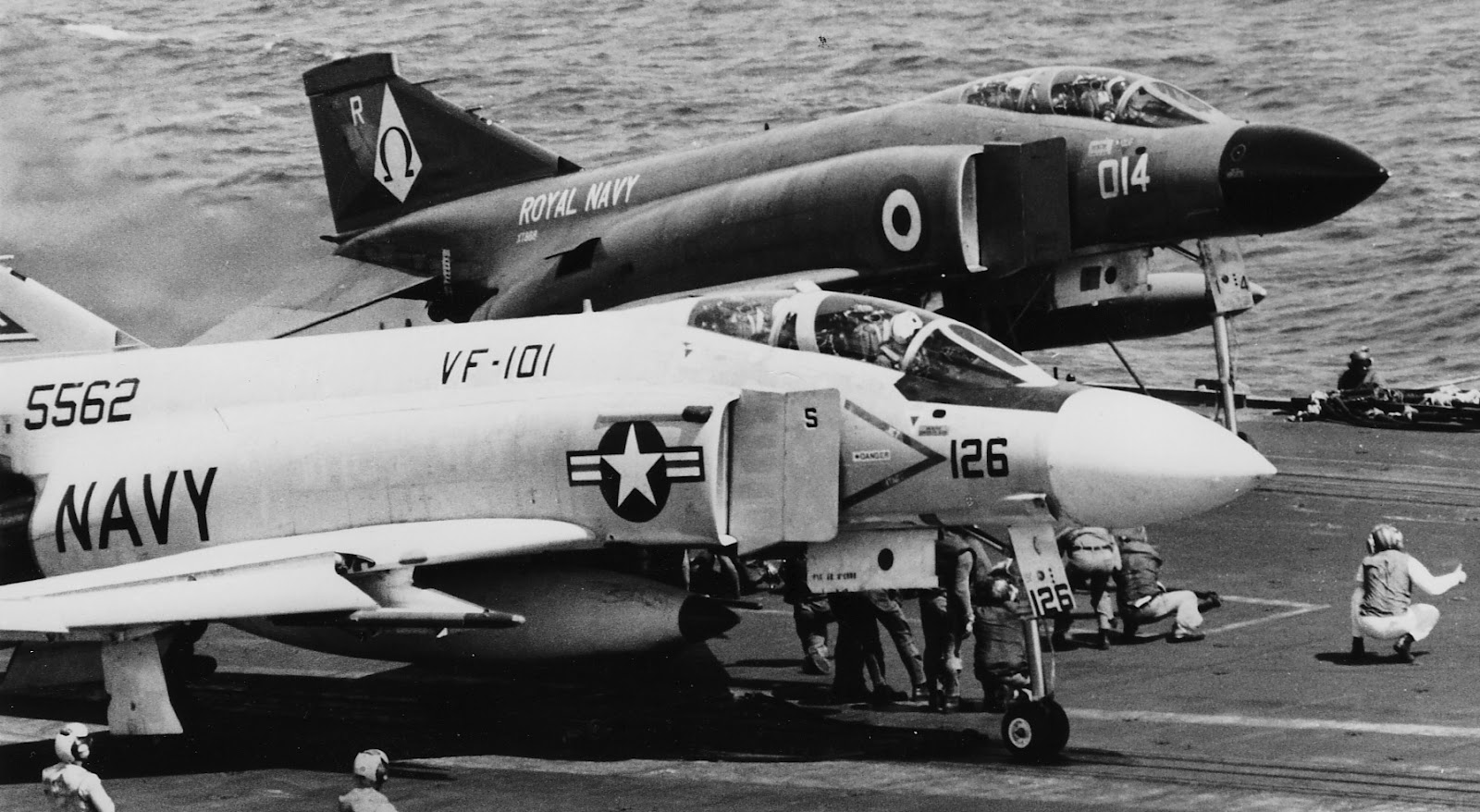
An F-4J of VF-101 alongside an F-4K of 892 Naval Air Squadron wait to be catapulted from Independence

Deploying from Norfolk in September 1971, the crew earned the designation as 'Blue Nose' sailors when the Independence crossed the Arctic Circle on 28 September. During subsequent operations in the North Sea, Independence conducted cross-deck operations with the British aircraft carrier HMS Ark Royal and transited the English Channel en route to the Strait of Gibraltar and scheduled operations in the Mediterranean Sea.

In May 1973, President Richard M. Nixon delivered his annual Armed Forces Day address from the decks of Independence. While based in Norfolk, the ship made deployments to the Mediterranean Sea and Indian Ocean. From 8 to 13 October 1973, Task Group 60.1 with Independence, Task Force 60.2 with Franklin D. Roosevelt, and Task Forces 61/62 with Guadalcanal were alerted for possible evacuation contingencies in the Middle East as a result of the 1973 Yom Kippur War between Arab states and Israel. Independence operated off the island of Crete.

In the summer of 1974, Independence departed Norfolk for yet another 'Med Cruise', operating with CTG 60.1 and CVW-7. Relieving Franklin D. Roosevelt, Independence and Saratoga continued the tradition of steaming the Mediterranean while being shadowed by Soviet aircraft and ships. On 8 September 1974, Independence and other ships steamed to the crash site of TWA Flight 841, which had been brought down by a terrorist bomb, and its crew spent two days retrieving the remains of the ill-fated jetliner and of the persons on board.

On 20 June 1979, Lieutenant Donna L. Spruill became the first female Navy pilot to carrier qualify in a fixed-wing aircraft. Lieutenant Spruill piloted a C-1A Trader to an arrested landing aboard Independence.

=== 1980–1989 ===
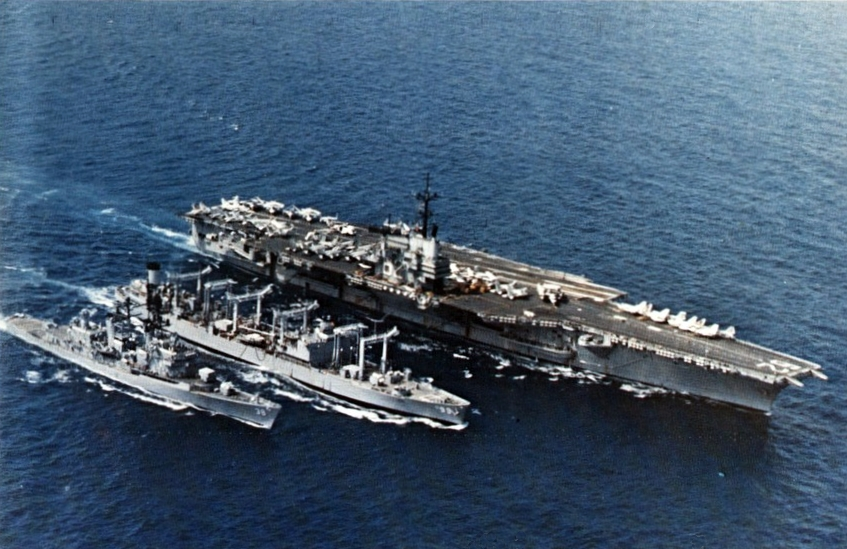
Independence and Luce during an underway replenishment with Canisteo during the carrier's 1980-81 cruise

On 19 November 1980, Independence with Carrier Air Wing Six (AE) embarked from Norfolk VA, and was deployed to the Indian Ocean, along with the cruiser Harry E. Yarnell. The ship was on watch along with Ranger at "Gonzo Station" to provide support in addressing the Iran hostage crisis. When President Reagan took office, the Iran Hostages were immediately freed in exchange for the release of Iranian assets, in accordance with the Algiers Accords. Subsequent to this, and after completing an Indian Ocean cruise, Independence transited the Suez Canal northbound. This was just after America had transited southbound, making America the first United States Navy carrier (and, thus, Independence the second) to transit the Suez Canal since Intrepid in 1967. Independence completed a deployment of 204 days. Originally scheduled to go to Singapore, the ship was instead diverted to the Persian Gulf to back up Nimitz during the Iran Hostage Crisis mission, with Capt. Thomas E. Shanahan Commanding. After being stationed in the Persian Gulf, Independence and her battle group visited Perth, Western Australia, docking in Fremantle, from 2 to 7 February for Rest and Relaxation. The ship returned to Norfolk on June 10, 1981. The Navy Cruise Book chronicles the journey.

In 1982, Independence provided critical support to the multinational peacekeeping force in Lebanon. On 25 June, the greatest concentration of U.S. Navy air power in the Mediterranean Sea resulted when the battle groups of Forrestal and Independence joined forces with Dwight D. Eisenhower and John F. Kennedy. After steaming together in the eastern Mediterranean Sea for several days, Forrestal and Independence relieved Dwight D. Eisenhower and John F. Kennedy, the latter sailing home to Norfolk, after a long deployment.

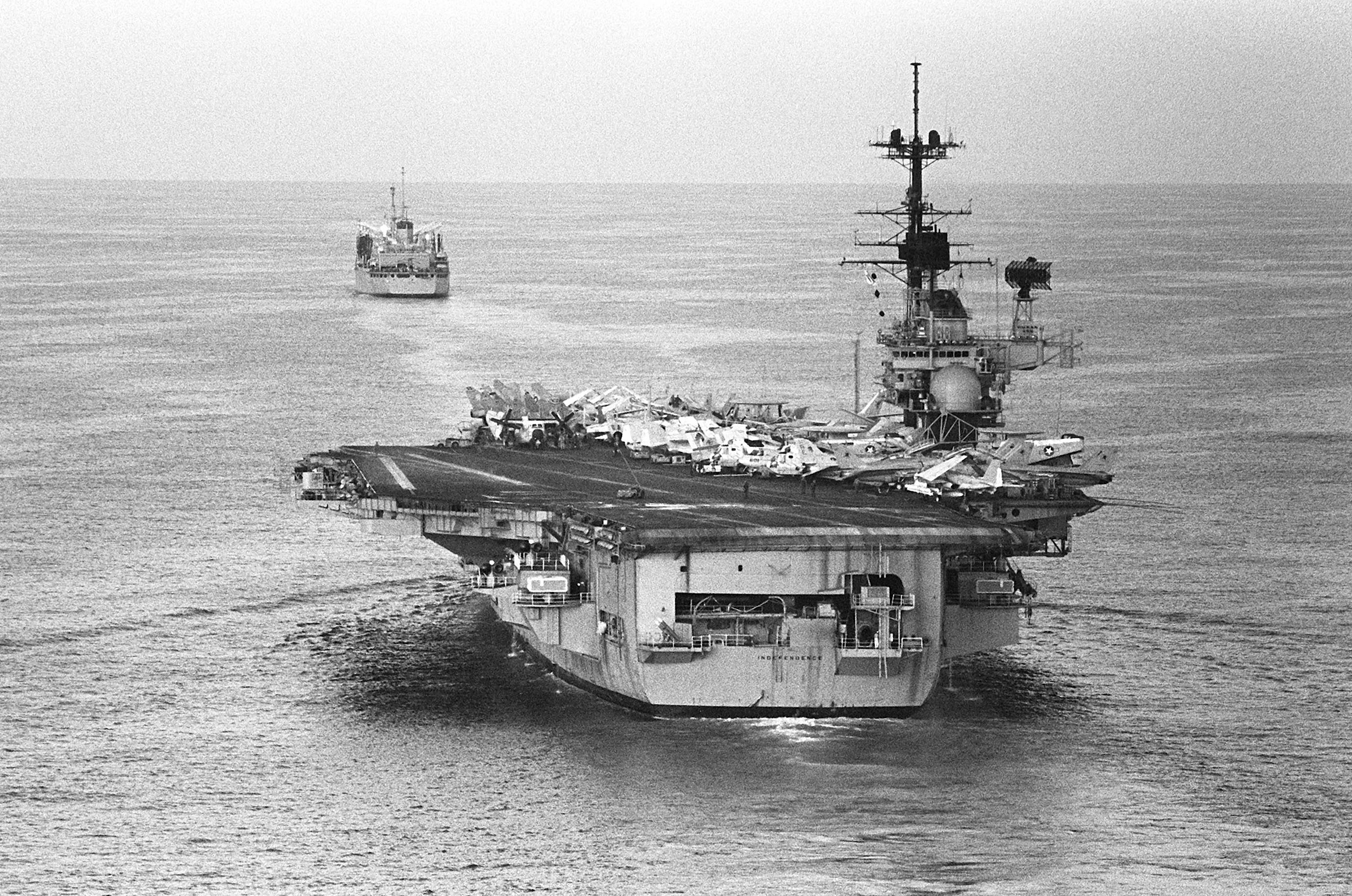
Independence operating off Lebanon in 1982.

In late October 1983, Independence's battle group (Carrier Group Four), assigned to the United States Second Fleet, became the core of Task Group 20.5, the carrier task group that would support the Invasion of Grenada. On 25 October 1983, aircraft from Independence's embarked air wing flew missions supporting the invasion. Returning to Lebanon that same year, the ship's air wing conducted air strikes against Syrian positions.

In 1984, she won the Marjorie Sterrett Battleship Fund Award for the Atlantic Fleet.

On 17 February 1985, Independence arrived at the Philadelphia Naval Shipyard to undergo a modernization and overhaul program to extend her service life by 15 years. The flight deck was improved to allow the recovery of high-performance aircraft while the ship traveled at slower speeds, and the NATO Sea Sparrow launchers were upgraded. Other improvements improved the ship's fuel consumption. Independence completed the Service Life Extension Program (SLEP) at Philadelphia Naval Shipyard in June 1988. Setting sail 15 August 1988 from Norfolk, the ship transited the tip of South America and arrived at her new homeport of NAS North Island, in San Diego, California, 8 October.

The Paramount film Flight of the Intruder (1991), starring Danny Glover, Willem Dafoe, and Brad Johnson was filmed partly on Independence. The aircraft carrier went out for two weeks of filming in November 1989; the on-board fire party was kept busy dealing with the numerous small electrical fires that the movie crew had started with their lighting equipment.

=== 1990–1995 ===
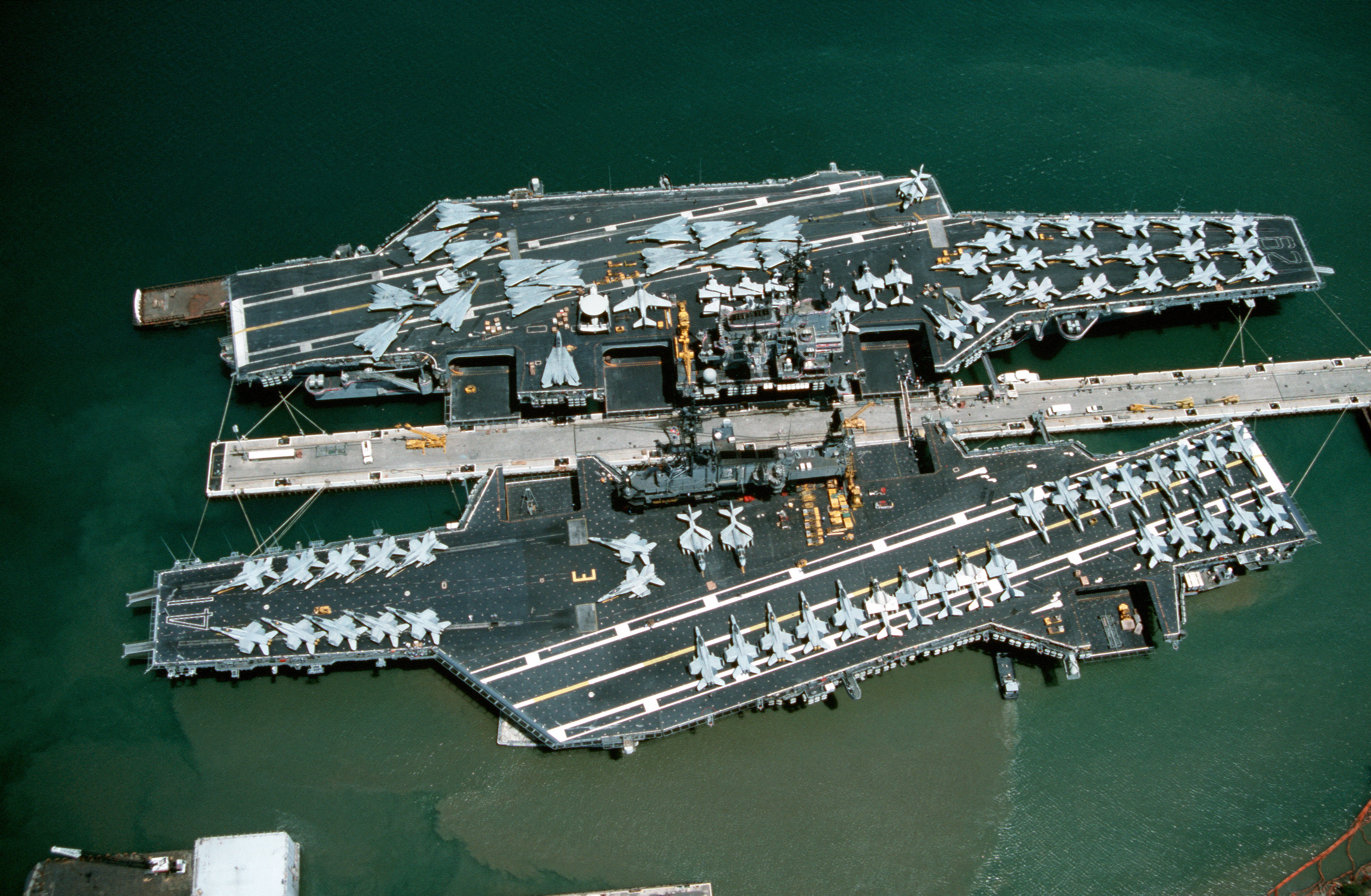
Independence (top) at Pearl Harbor relieving Midway as the 7th Fleet forward deployed carrier

In June 1990, with Carrier Air Wing 14 embarked, Independence departs San Diego on a routine WESTPAC. On 2 August, in response to Iraq's invasion of Kuwait, Independence, leading Task Group 800.1, which included Jouett (CG-29), was sent to deter further Iraqi aggression during Operation Desert Shield. Arriving on station in the Gulf of Oman on 5 August, Independence was the first carrier to enter the Persian Gulf since 1974. The ship remained on station for 112 days and permanently reestablished a U.S. naval presence in the region. She returned to San Diego on 20 December 1990.

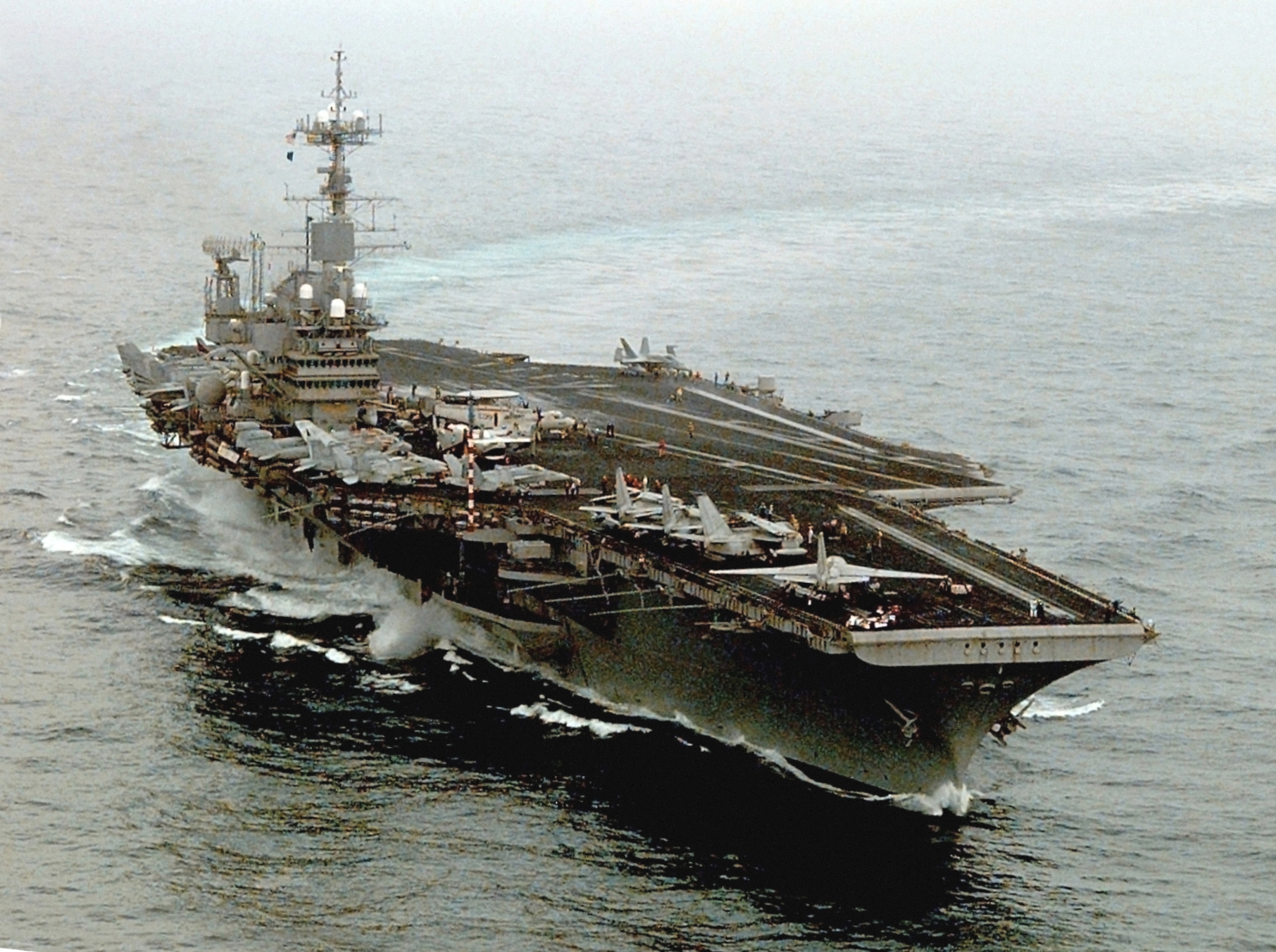
Independence in the Persian Gulf in support of Operation Southern Watch

Independence changed homeports again on 11 September 1991—this time to Yokosuka, Japan, embarking Carrier Air Wing 5 and becoming the Navy's only permanently forward-deployed aircraft carrier, and flagship for Commander, Carrier Group Five.

On 23 August 1992, Independence entered the Persian Gulf, under the Command of Captain Carter B. Refo prepared to enforce an Allied ban on Iraqi flights over south Iraq below the 32nd parallel north. On 26 August, President George H. W. Bush announced that the United States and its allies had informed Iraq that in 24 hours allied aircraft would fly surveillance missions in southern Iraq and were prepared to shoot down any Iraqi aircraft flying south of the 32nd parallel. The action was precipitated by Iraq's failure to comply with U.N. Resolution 688, which demanded that the Iraqi government stop the repression of its Shiite population in southern Iraq.

Persian Gulf allies began to enforce the ban on Iraqi planes from flying south of the 32nd parallel on 27 August in Operation Southern Watch. Any Iraqi planes that violated the ban would be shot down. Twenty Navy aircraft from CVW-5 aboard Independence in the Persian Gulf were the first coalition aircraft on station over Iraq as Operation Southern Watch began. Southern Watch was the enforcement of a ban on Iraqi warplanes and helicopters from flying south of the 32nd parallel.

Independence became the most battle experienced ship in the Navy's active fleet, and the first carrier in history to hold that distinction, on 30 June 1995. With this honor, Independence displayed the Revolution-era First Navy Jack, commonly called the "Don't Tread on Me" flag, from her bow until her decommissioning. The flag was presented to Independence's commanding officer Capt. David P. Polatty III in a formal ceremony on 1 July. The flag was received from Mauna Kea upon her decommissioning.

In November 1995, Independence and Carrier Air Wing Five returned to Japan after successfully completing their third deployment to the Persian Gulf in support of Operation Southern Watch.

=== 1996–1998 ===
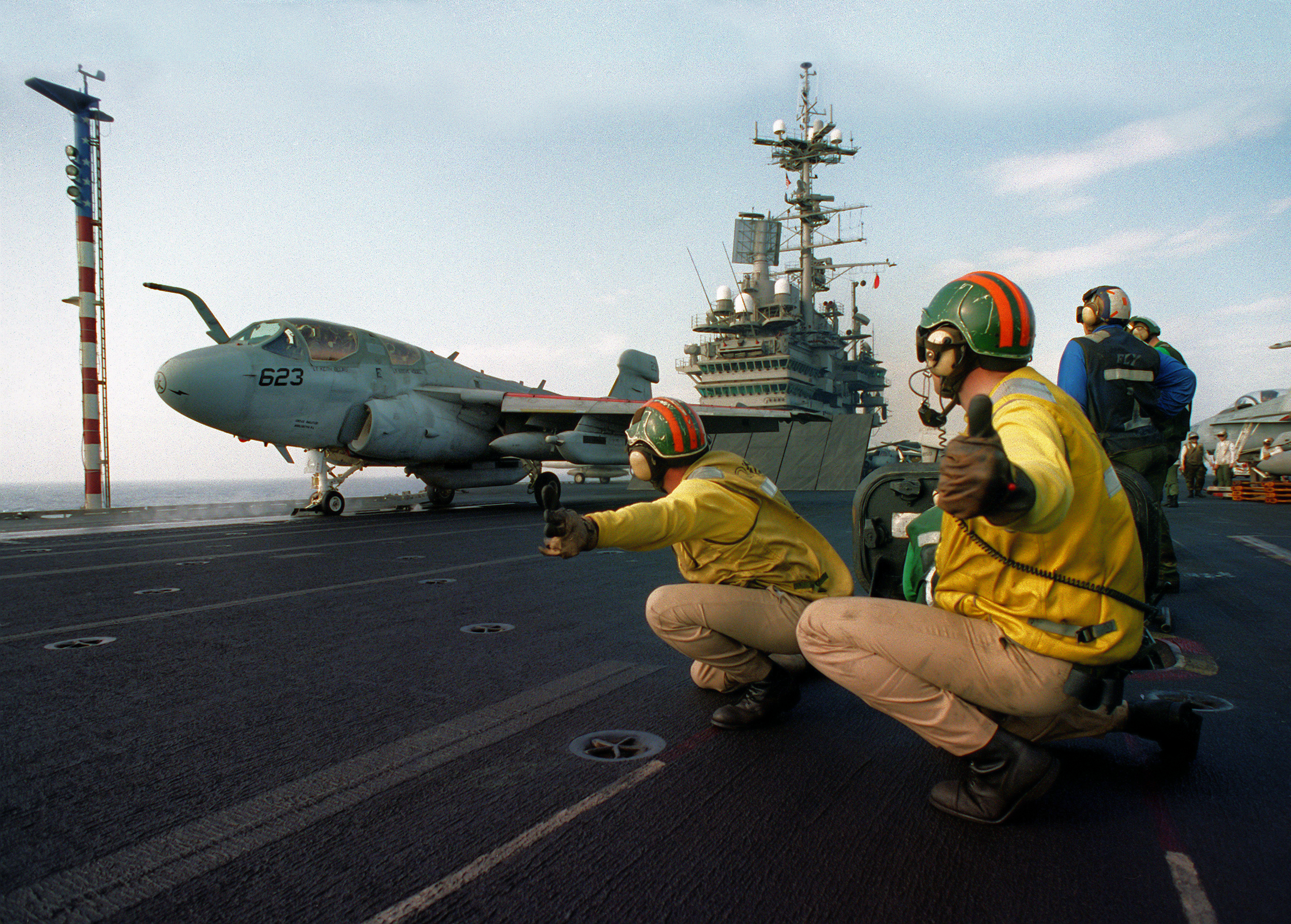
USS Independence conducts air operations off the coast of Taiwan during the Third Taiwan Strait Crisis.

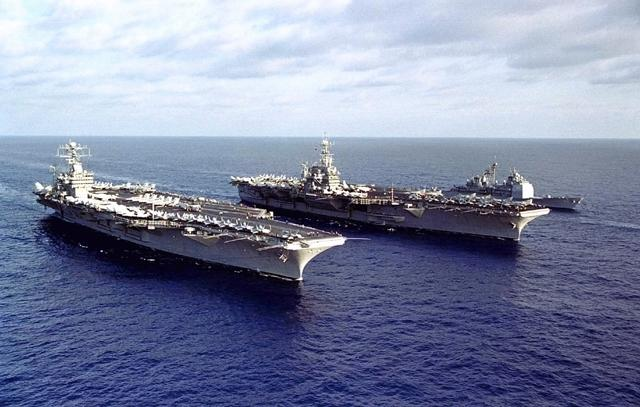
Independence (right) cruises alongside Nimitz and Port Royal off Japan in 1997

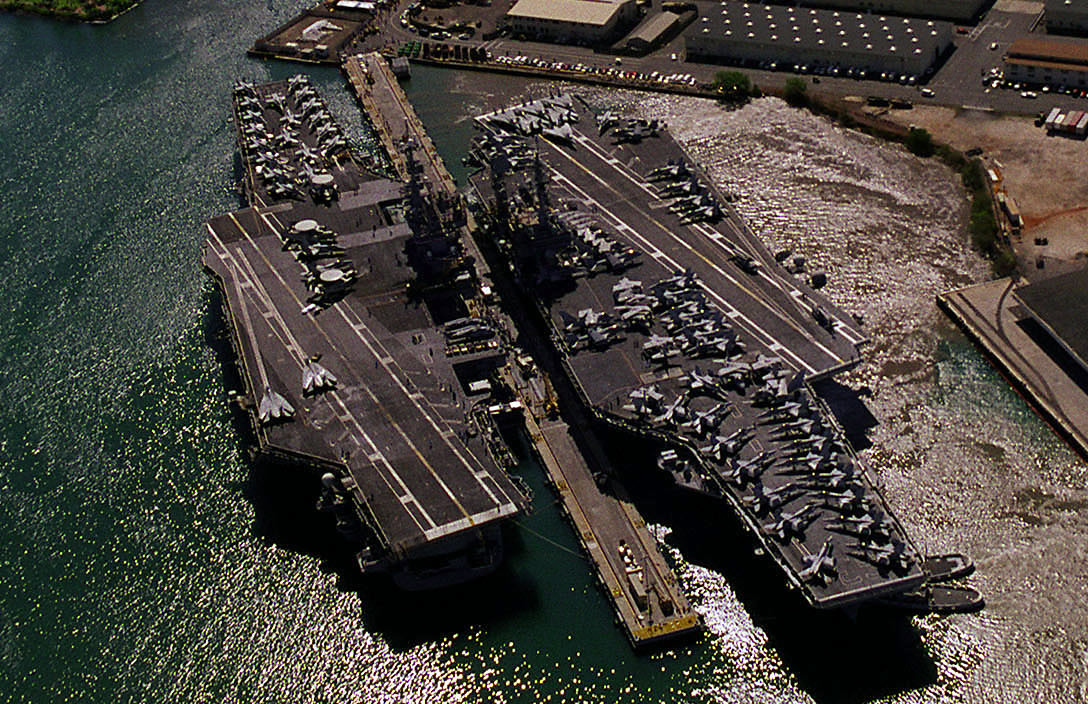
Independence (left) at Pearl Harbor being relieved as the 7th Fleet forward deployed carrier by Kitty Hawk

In March 1996, Independence was deployed to the waters east of Taiwan to provide a stabilizing presence amid the Third Taiwan Strait Crisis. She was joined in the area by Nimitz as the People's Republic of China lobbed missiles into Taiwanese territorial waters. On returning to Yokosuka in April 1996, the ship was visited by President Bill Clinton as part of an official state visit to Japan.

In 1997, Independence made a four-month deployment, covering several major exercises and seven ports of call. Included in these ports of call were two historic port visits. The first was 28 February 1997 to the island territory of Guam. Independence was the first aircraft carrier to pull into Guam in 36 years.

The second, two months later, was to Port Klang, Malaysia. Independence became the first aircraft carrier in the world to make a port visit to Malaysia.

Before sailing back to Yokosuka, Japan, Independence made her last port call of the deployment in May 1997 to Hong Kong. The ship's port call was the last U.S. naval visit to the territory before its handover to China on 1 July 1997.

Independence deployed to the Persian Gulf in January 1998 to support negotiations between the UN and Iraq and to again participate in Operation Southern Watch, prior to being relieved at Yokosuka by Kitty Hawk. The ship had been scheduled for its final cruise when it was ordered to the Persian Gulf.

== In popular culture ==
Independence was used for filming the 1991 movie Flight Of The Intruder with shots of the CV 62 number on the island and credit at the end of the film.

The Independence is mentioned in episode 14 of season 3 of The West Wing.

== Decommissioning and fate ==
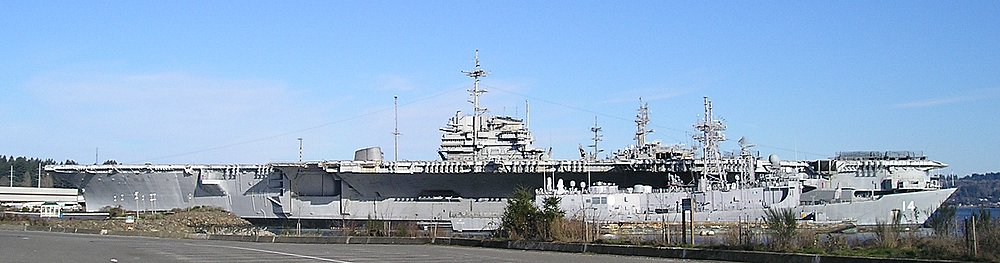
ex-Independence in mothballs, in Puget Sound Naval Shipyard

Independence was decommissioned in ceremonies at the Puget Sound Naval Shipyard in Bremerton, Washington, on 30 September 1998. At the conclusion of this ceremony, in keeping with naval tradition, Independence's last commanding officer, Captain (later Rear Admiral) Mark R. Milliken, USN, was the last person to depart the ship.

Independence's commissioning pennant was hauled down 39 years, 9 months and 20 days after it was first hoisted, and the "Don't Tread on Me" First Navy Jack was transferred to the Navy's next oldest active ship, the aircraft carrier Kitty Hawk.

After decommissioning, Independence remained in mothballs for five and a half years before being struck on 8 March 2004. During her time in mothballs, the ship was said to have been heavily stripped to support the active carrier fleet, especially the remaining Kitty Hawk-class aircraft carriers. Her port anchor and both anchor chains were used on the new Nimitz-class aircraft carrier USS George H.W. Bush. The recycling of parts and the poor material condition of the ship at the time she was withdrawn made a strong argument against retaining her as a potential museum ship. In April 2004, Navy officials identified ex-Independence as one of 24 decommissioned ships available to be sunk as artificial reefs. However, as of February 2008, she was scheduled to be dismantled in the next five years along with USS Constellation. At that time, she was still available for donation as a reef while awaiting a contract for her dismantling to be awarded.

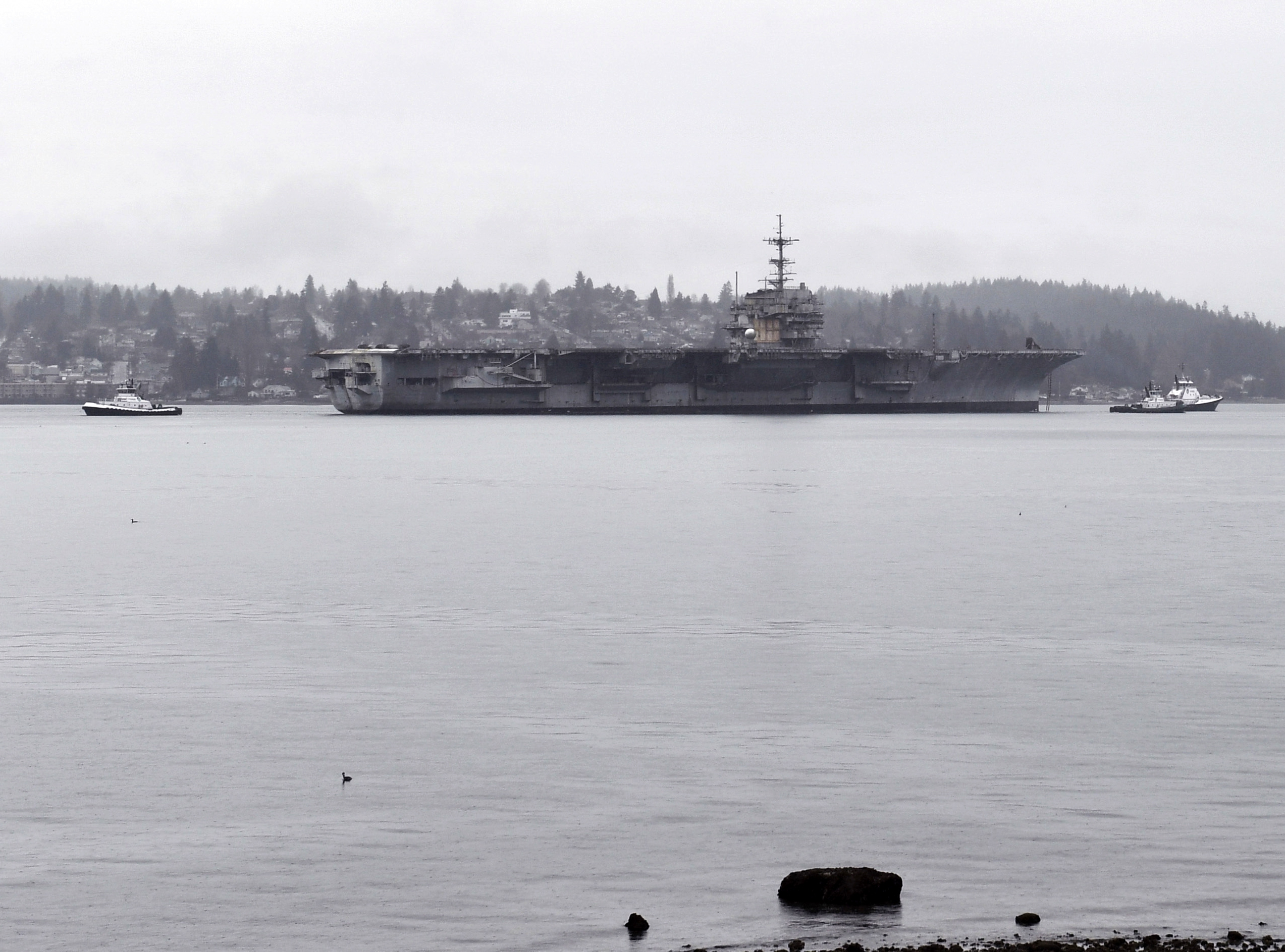
Ex-Independence is towed to the breaker's yard on 11 March 2017.

On 26 January 2012, the Navy's Naval Sea Systems Command posted a notice of solicitation for the towing and complete dismantlement of multiple CV-59/CV-63 Class Aircraft Carriers in the United States, including Forrestal, Independence, and Constellation. The impacts of an initial scraping for marine life in the Puget Sound required remediation with a layer of sand over the scraping area.

Following the disposal of Ranger and Constellation, on 10 March 2017 Independence began her 16,000-mile journey from Puget Sound Naval Shipyard to Brownsville, Texas for dismantling by International Shipbreaking.On 26 April 2017, she was on her way through the Strait of Magellan, and on 30 May 2017 she arrived at Brownsville, where a special ceremony was held at Isla Blanca Park for veterans, school children and members of the local community to honour the vessel. Scrapping was completed by early 2019.

Two of the ship's propellers are on display at South Padre Island.

== See also ==
- List of aircraft carriers
- List of aircraft carriers of the United States Navy

== Bibliography ==
- Baker, A.D. (1998). The Naval Institute Guide to Combat Fleets of the World 1998–1999: Their Ships, Aircraft and Systems. Annapolis, Maryland: Naval Institute Press. ISBN 1-55750-111-4.
- Chesneau, Roger (1998). Aircraft Carriers of the World, 1914 to the Present: An Illustrated Encyclopedia. London: Brockhampton Press. ISBN 1-86019-875-9.
- Doa, Tom (1996). "Question 25/93: USN/USCG Collisions with Merchant Vessels". Warship International. XXXIII (3): 319. ISSN 0043-0374.
- Gardiner, Robert; Chumbley, Stephen (1995). Conway's All the World's Fighting Ships 1947–1995. Annapolis, Maryland: Naval Institute Press. ISBN 1-55750-132-7.
- Grossnick, Roy A. (1997). United States Naval Aviation 1910–1995. Washington DC: Naval Historical Center, Department of the Navy. ISBN 0-945274-34-3. Archived from the original on 23 January 2015.
- Weeks, Mike (March–April 1999). "Freedom's Flagship: A History of Independence (CVA/CV 62)" (PDF). Naval Aviation News.
- It also includes text from "United States Naval Aviation, 1910-1995". Archived from the original on 23 January 2015.

Preceded by USS Mauna Kea (AE-22)	Oldest active combat ship of the United States Navy; 1995–1998	Succeeded by USS Kitty Hawk (CV 63)
