= USS Nitro (AE-23) =

Ammunition ship of the United States Navy

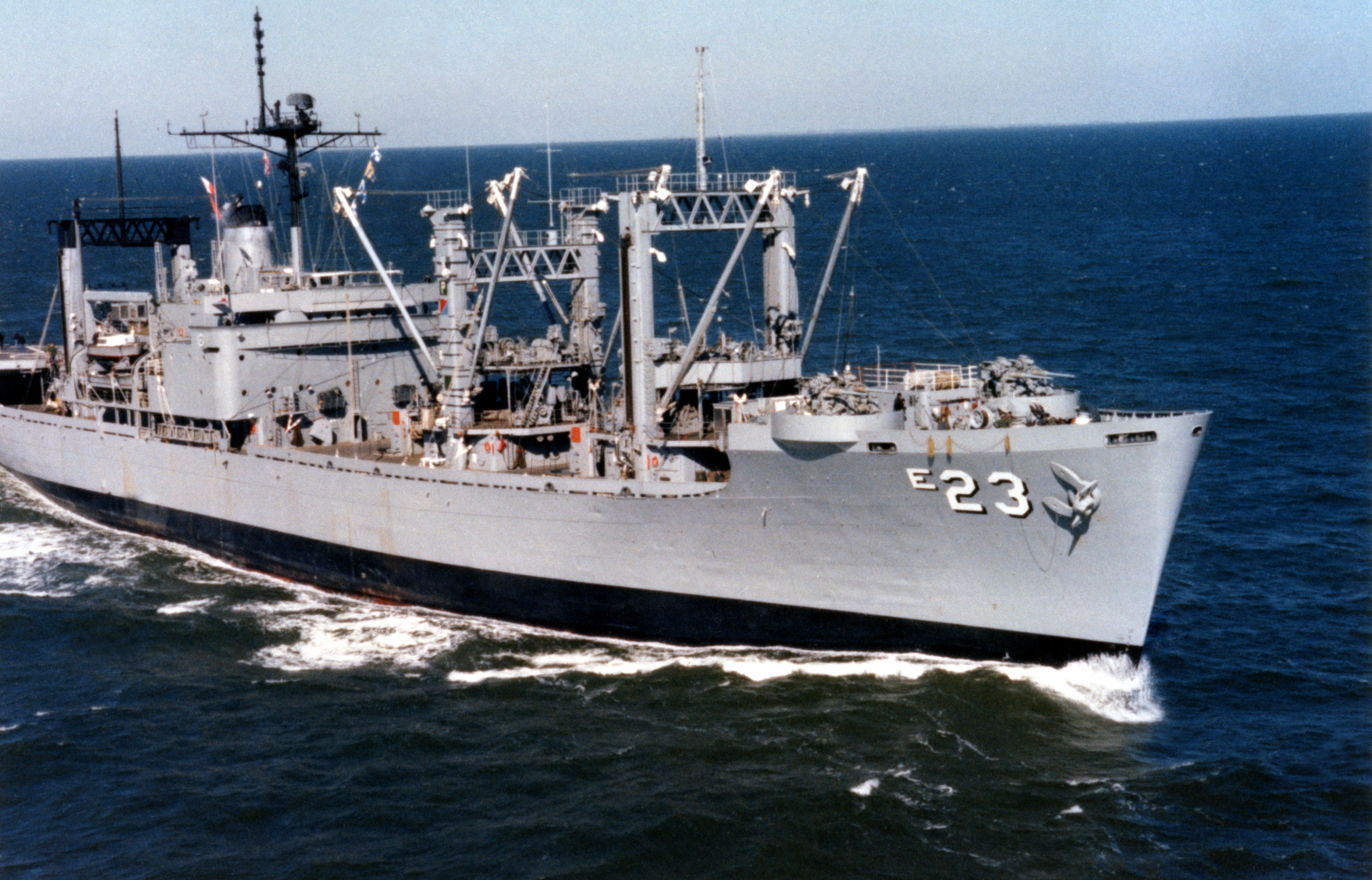
- USS Nitro in 1983

History

United States
- Name: USS Nitro (AE-23)
- Builder: Bethlehem Steel Corporation
- Laid down: 20 May 1957
- Launched: 25 June 1958
- Commissioned: 1 May 1959
- Decommissioned: 28 April 1995
- Stricken: 14 August 1995
- Fate: Scrapped in Brownsville Texas

General characteristics
- Class & type: Nitro-class ammunition ship
- Displacement: 8,300 tons
- Length: 512 ft (156 m)
- Beam: 72 ft (22 m)
- Draft: 29 ft (8.8 m)
- Speed: 20 knots
- Complement: 331
- Armament: 4 x 3 in (76 mm) guns

USS Nitro (AE–23), an ammunition ship in the U.S. Navy, was laid down by Bethlehem Steel Corporation's Sparrows Point Shipyard at Baltimore, Maryland, on 20 May 1957 and launched on 25 June 1958. It was sponsored by Mrs. Mary Elizabeth Bunting Pate, the wife of General Randolph M. Pate, and commissioned on 1 May 1959.

== Early history ==
After shakedown in the Caribbean, Nitro was welcomed at her homeport of Davisville, Rhode Island. After lengthy 2nd Fleet exercises she joined the 6th Fleet in the Mediterranean in February 1960, returning in September. She was back in the Mediterranean in the summer of 1961, returning to Norfolk on 3 March 1962. During April and May she supported 2nd Fleet exercises in the Caribbean. On 6 September she steamed for an operational and good will visit to Northern Europe, returning to Earle, N.J., 15 October. From 11 to 24 November, Nitro sailed to the Caribbean in support of the Task Force engaged in the quarantine of Cuba. She returned to Davisville on 24 November.

On 18 May 1966, her status was changed to in commission in reserve for conversion at Maryland Shipbuilding and Drydock Company, Baltimore, where she remained until recommissioned "special" 31 August 1967. She got underway 16 October to operate off the east coast and at year's end was back at Davisville. Continuing the series of Med deployments, Nitro was overhauled in Boston in the summer of 1971. Following that she made another round of the Caribbean and then visited the weapons stations at Davisville, Earle and Yorktown.

== Vietnam service ==
Leaving Davisville on 24 April 1972, Nitro stopped at Naval Weapons Station Earle to top off weapons stores. As the ship left port to begin the transit to Vietnam, seven sailors jumped off the ship in protest of the war. A trailing Coast Guard cutter collected the sailors and returned them to Nitro. Five days later Nitro transited the Panama Canal for the first time.

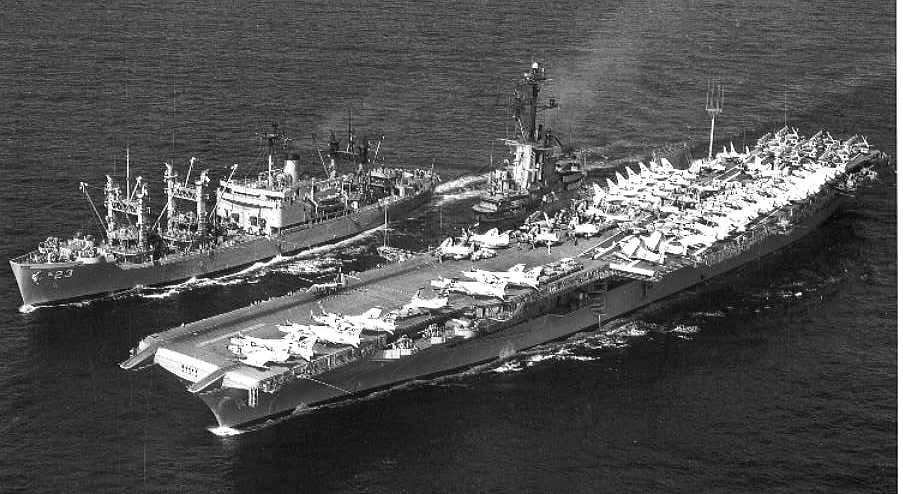
Nitro replenishing USS Intrepid (CVA-11) in the early 1960s.

From May 1972 through February 1973 the Nitro made a series of line swings off the coast of both South and North Vietnam. On 28 June while conducting underway replenishment with the USS Oriskany, the carrier collided with Nitro with minimum damage to both ships. Nitro continued to conduct replenishment operations, including replenishment for the carriers during the 11-day "Christmas bombings" designed to bring North Vietnam back to the bargaining table in Paris. After a stop in Japan and other ports Nitro returned to Davisville on 12 March 1973.

== Later service and retirement ==
While operating in the Med during the spring of 1981, Nitro suffered a class "B" fire in the engineering space on 1 June 1981 which caused a significant amount of damage to the entire starboard side of the engineering space and many other spaces due to subsequent fires. Six personnel were injured. Nitro was towed to Souda Bay, Crete, by the USNS Neosho where she started emergency repairs and off-loaded ammunition. The ship was then towed to Hellenic Shipyard in Athens by the USS Edenton where she underwent a 30-day availability for extensive repairs prior to returning to operations in the Med. Nitro then steamed back to the US, where she underwent major refitting in the Brooklyn Naval Yard.

After continuing her alternating service with the 2nd and 6th Fleets into the 1990s Nitro was decommissioned on 28 April 1995 and struck from the Naval Register on 14 August of the same year. She was laid up in the Atlantic Reserve Fleet, Naval Inactive Ship Maintenance Facility, Portsmouth (Virginia, USA). On 31 March 2000 she was turned over to the Maritime Administration for lay up in the National Defense Reserve Fleet, James River, Fort Eustis, Virginia. In July 2008, the Nitro was sold to Esco Marine of Brownsville, Tx. for scrapping.
