= USS Pyro (AE-24) =

U.S. Navy ammunition ship

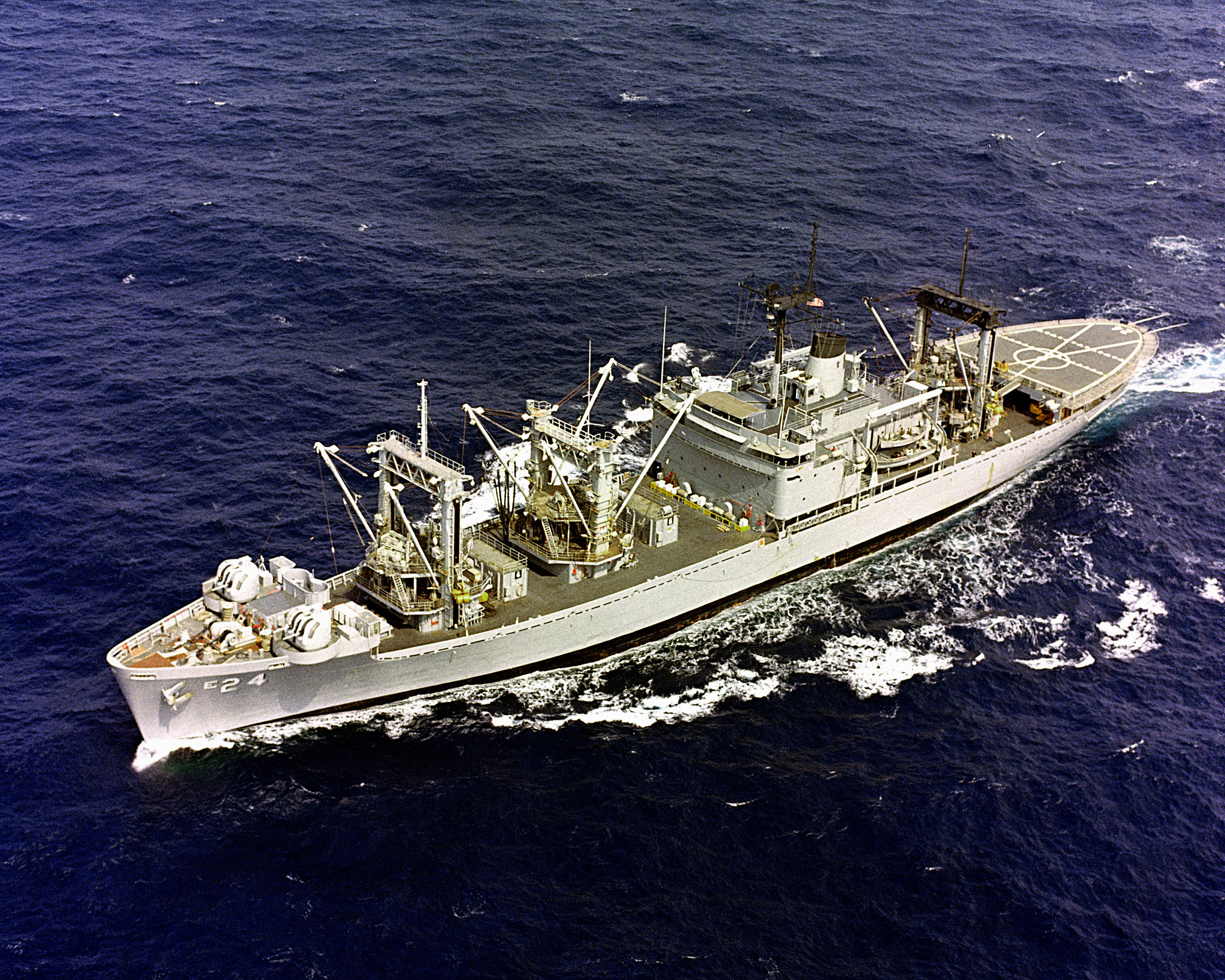
- USS Pyro (AE-24) in 1980

History

United States
- Name: USS Pyro (AE-24)
- Builder: Bethlehem Steel Corporation
- Laid down: 21 October 1957
- Launched: 5 November 1958
- Commissioned: 24 July 1959
- Decommissioned: 31 May 1994
- Stricken: 8 April 1997
- Fate: Scrapped 2012

General characteristics
- Class & type: Nitro-class ammunition ship
- Displacement: 8,300 tons
- Length: 512 ft (156 m)
- Beam: 72 ft (22 m)
- Draft: 29 ft (8.8 m)
- Speed: 20 knots
- Complement: 331
- Armament: 4 x 3 in (76 mm) guns
- Notes: Nitro, Pyro, Haleakala are all Nitro class and sister ships. Preceded by the Suribachi class and followed by the Kilauea class

The second USS Pyro (AE–24), an ammunition ship, was laid down 21 October 1957 by Bethlehem-Sparrows Point Shipyard, Inc., Sparrows Point, Maryland; launched 5 November 1958; sponsored by Mrs. Stuart H. Ingersoll; and commissioned 24 July 1959 at Norfolk Naval Shipyard, Norfolk, Va.

After fitting out at Norfolk Naval Shipyard, Pyro moved from local operations at Norfolk to Earle, N.J. to take on ammunition, thence proceeded to shakedown out of Guantanamo Bay, Cuba through 30 October. She called at San Juan and Kingston before transiting the Panama Canal to report to Service Force, Pacific for duty. Steaming via Lima, Peru and Acapulco, Mexico, she arrived San Diego 4 December 1959. The fourth of a new class of ammunition ships designed from the hull up for carrying and transferring at sea the latest in munitions and guided missiles, Pyro spent the last part of December undergoing final trials at San Francisco.

At Port Chicago, Calif., Pyro offloaded her cargo, then spent the month of January 1960 at Mare Island Naval Shipyard. Through February the ship was at Port Chicago making preparations for her first WestPac deployment. She departed late that month, calling at Pearl Harbor; Sasebo, Yokosuka, Kobe, and Iwakuni, Japan; and at Okinawa and Hong Kong, while fulfilling her assigned tasks and providing underway replenishment services to various units of the 7th Fleet before returning to Concord, Calif. 15 August 1960.

A three-month overhaul commenced 21 March at Willamette Iron and Steel Co. Shipyard, Richmond, Calif. Pyro then departed on her second WestPac deployment 9 August 1961 and again serviced units of the 7th Fleet, returning to Concord, Calif. 1 March 1962. Local operations such as exercise "Pork Barrel", in May, provided realistic tests of the capabilities of the ships of the Service Force.

Pyro subsequently made annual deployments to WestPac after 8 October 1962. Much of her at sea time was spent on Yankee Station in support of 7th Fleet Units operating off the coast of Vietnam.

She entered the San Francisco Naval Shipyard 9 September 1963 for installation of a revolutionary new weapons transfer system called FAST—Fast Automatic Shuttle Transfer. The new system proved its worth during her fourth WestPac deployment, 12 January through 17 June 1964. For her outstanding performance in servicing 7th Fleet units during the period 5 December 1964 through 23 October 1965, when she conducted 227 ammunition unreps, she received the Navy Unit Commendation ribbon.

Into the 1970s Pyro remained active with the Pacific Fleet, providing vital underway ammunition replenishment services during her annual deployments and refining her readiness and maintaining her high material and personnel standards during port periods.

In early 1994, the USS Pyro (AE-24) was decommissioned, struck from the Naval register in April 1997 and later, was moved to the Suisun Bay, CA, Nest A.

In February 2012, Pyro departed San Francisco Bay under tow for scrapping at European Metal Recycling's Southern Recycling in New Orleans, LA. Her recycling was complete by the end of 2012.
