= VX-9 =

Air Test and Evaluation Squadron 9
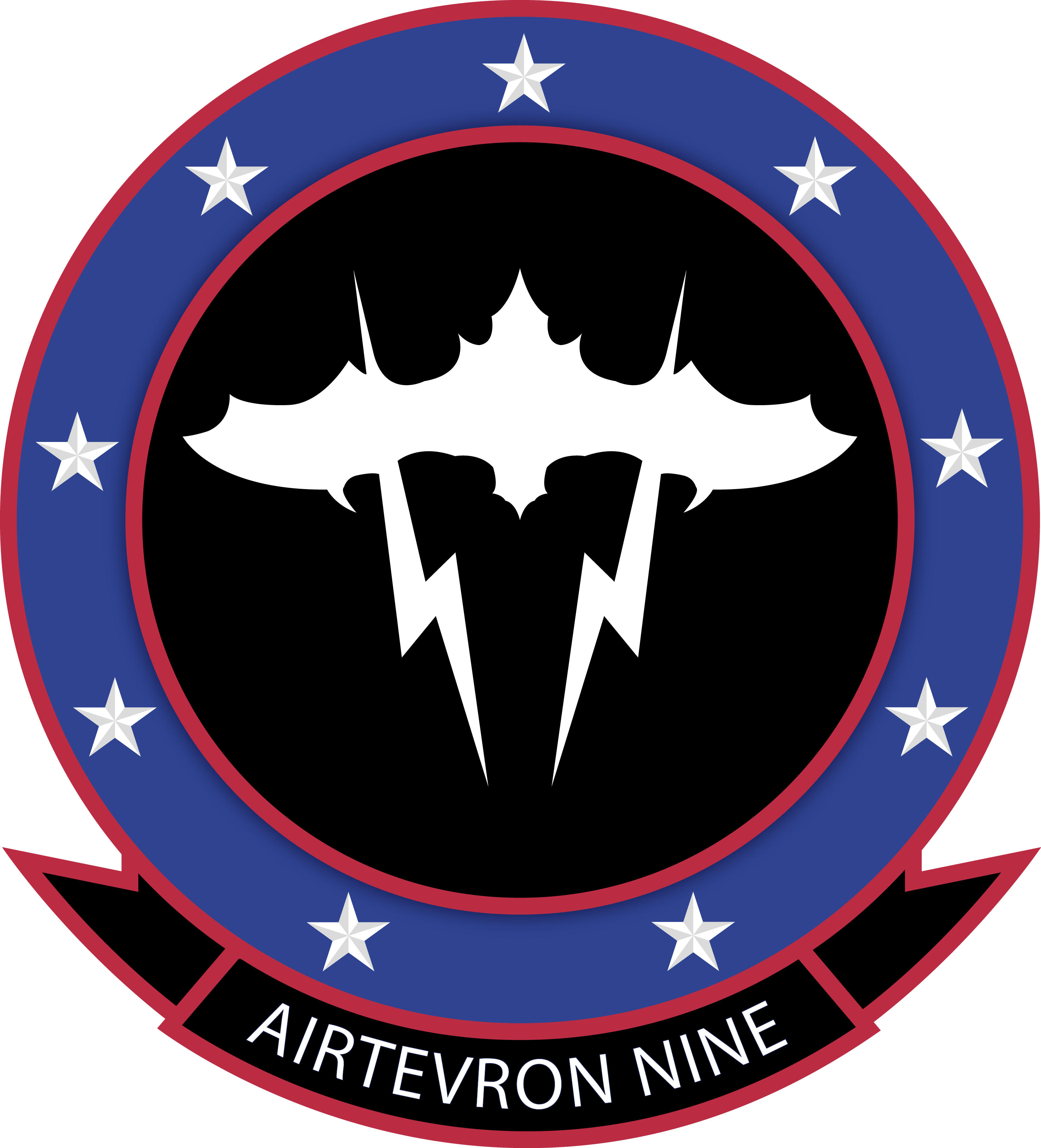
- VX-9 Insignia
- Active: 18 June 1951
- Country: United States
- Branch: United States Navy
- Role: Operational Test Squadron
- Garrison/HQ: Naval Air Weapons Station China Lake
- Nickname: "The Vampires"

Commanders
- Current commander: Captain Matthew Davin

Insignia
- Tail Code: XE

Aircraft flown
- Electronic warfare: EA-18G Growler
- Fighter: F/A-18E/F Super Hornet; F-35A Lightning II; F-35C Lightning II

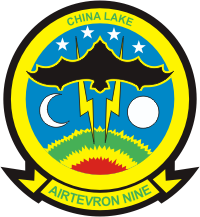

Air Test and Evaluation Squadron Nine (AIRTEVRON NINE, VX-9, nicknamed The Vampires) is a United States Navy air test and evaluation squadron based at Naval Air Weapons Station China Lake, California. Using the tail code XE, the squadron operates F/A-18E/F Super Hornets, EA-18G Growlers, and the F-35C Lightning II.

== History ==
Air Test and Evaluation Squadron Nine (VX-9), originally Air Development Squadron Five (VX-5), was commissioned on 18 June 1951 at Naval Air Station Moffett Field, California, with 15 officers, 100 enlisted men, and nine AD Skyraider aircraft. The squadron, under the operational control of Operational Development Force (now Commander Operational Test and Evaluation Force), was assigned to develop and evaluate aircraft tactics and techniques for delivery of airborne special weapons. In the 1970s, the squadron was renamed Air Test and Evaluation Squadron FIVE, but retained its VX-5 designation.

Over the years, VX-5 has maintained numerous detachments around the U.S. to take full advantage of the variety and diversity of facilities available, and to help keep the Squadron abreast of the latest fleet tactics. These detachments have included NAS Oceana, Virginia; Naval Weapons Evaluation Facility at Kirtland AFB, New Mexico; NAS Whidbey Island, Washington; and the former NAS Sanford, Florida.

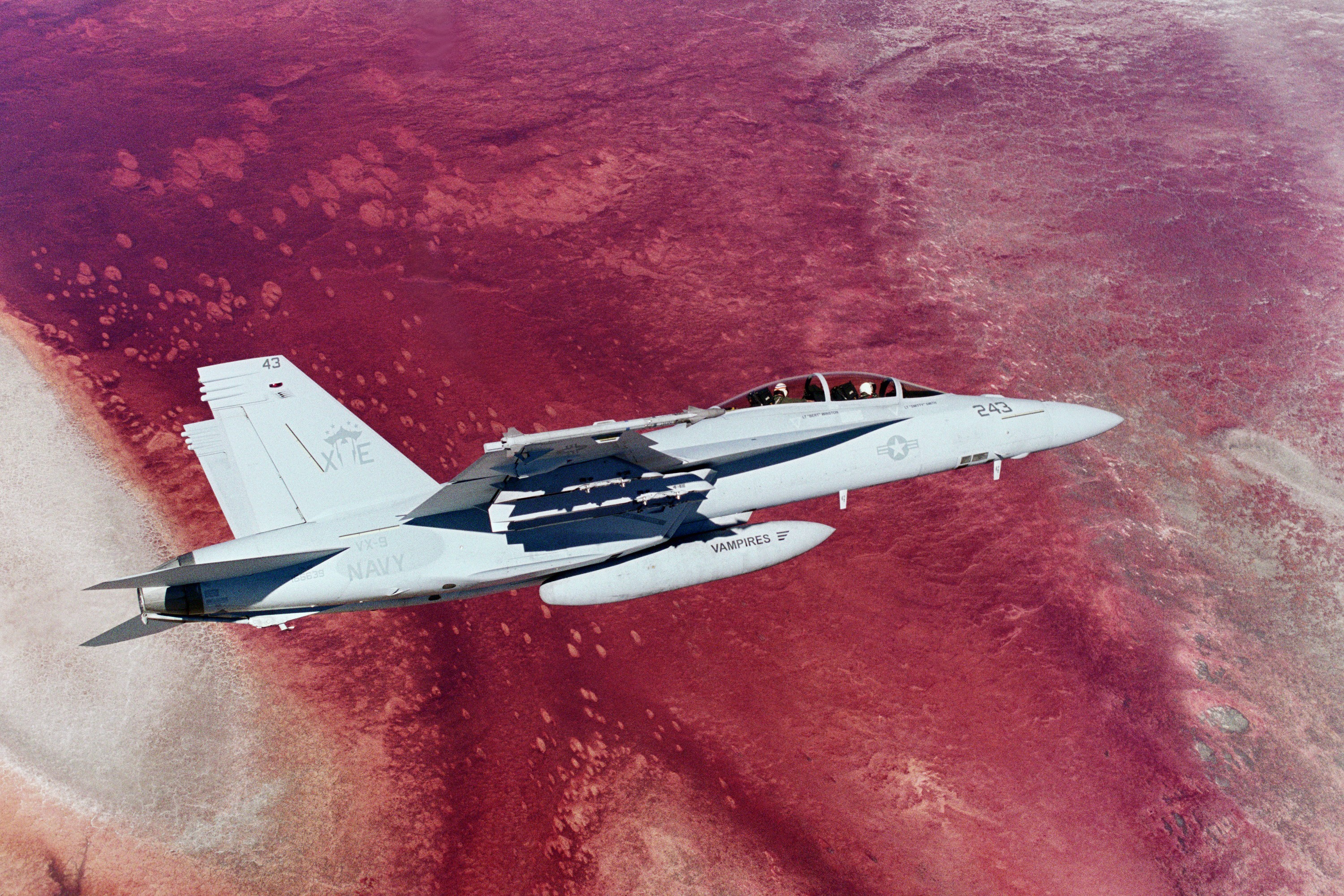
VX-9 F/A-18F Super Hornet over the Owens Lake in the vast Eastern High Sierra and Mojave Desert test ranges.

In July 1956 VX-5 moved to the Naval Air Weapons Station China Lake, California, as an independent tenant command because of the availability of vastly improved ranges and instrumentation facilities. In January 1985, the VX-5 Detachment at Whidbey Island, which oversaw developments relating to the EA-6B weapon system, was relocated to China Lake. Since then, temporary detachments have been made nationwide from Alaska to Florida, as required to test airborne weapons in a variety of conditions. The squadron has, due to changes and improvements in Navy weapon system, evolved over the years to include independent operation test and evaluation of all air-dropped munitions destined for operational use of the US Navy and US Marine Corps as well as development of tactics to be used with the new weapon system, and incorporation of electronic warfare advances into the self-defense capability of attack aircraft.

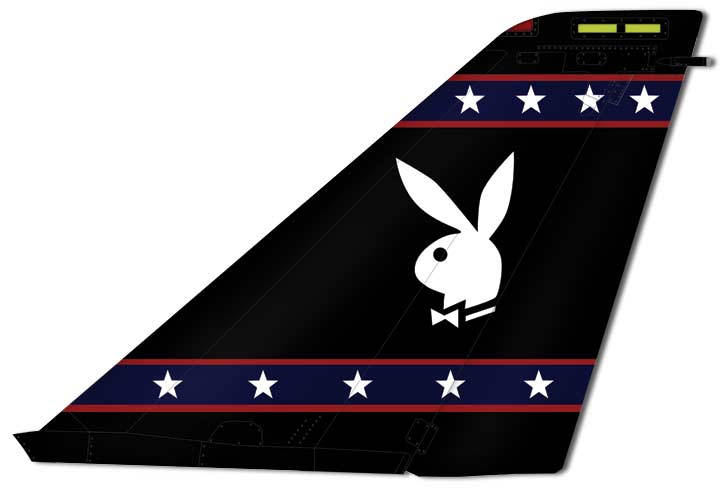
VX-9 Det Point Mugu F-14D tail markings

In June 1993, the Chief of Naval Operations directed that the naval fighter aircraft community's Air Test and Evaluation Squadron Four VX-4 at NAS Point Mugu, California and VX-5 to be merged into a single operational test and evaluation squadron to be designated as VX-9, with a permanent F-14 Tomcat Detachment to be located at Point Mugu. This initiative was launched as part of the reductions of U.S naval forces in the aftermath of the Cold War.

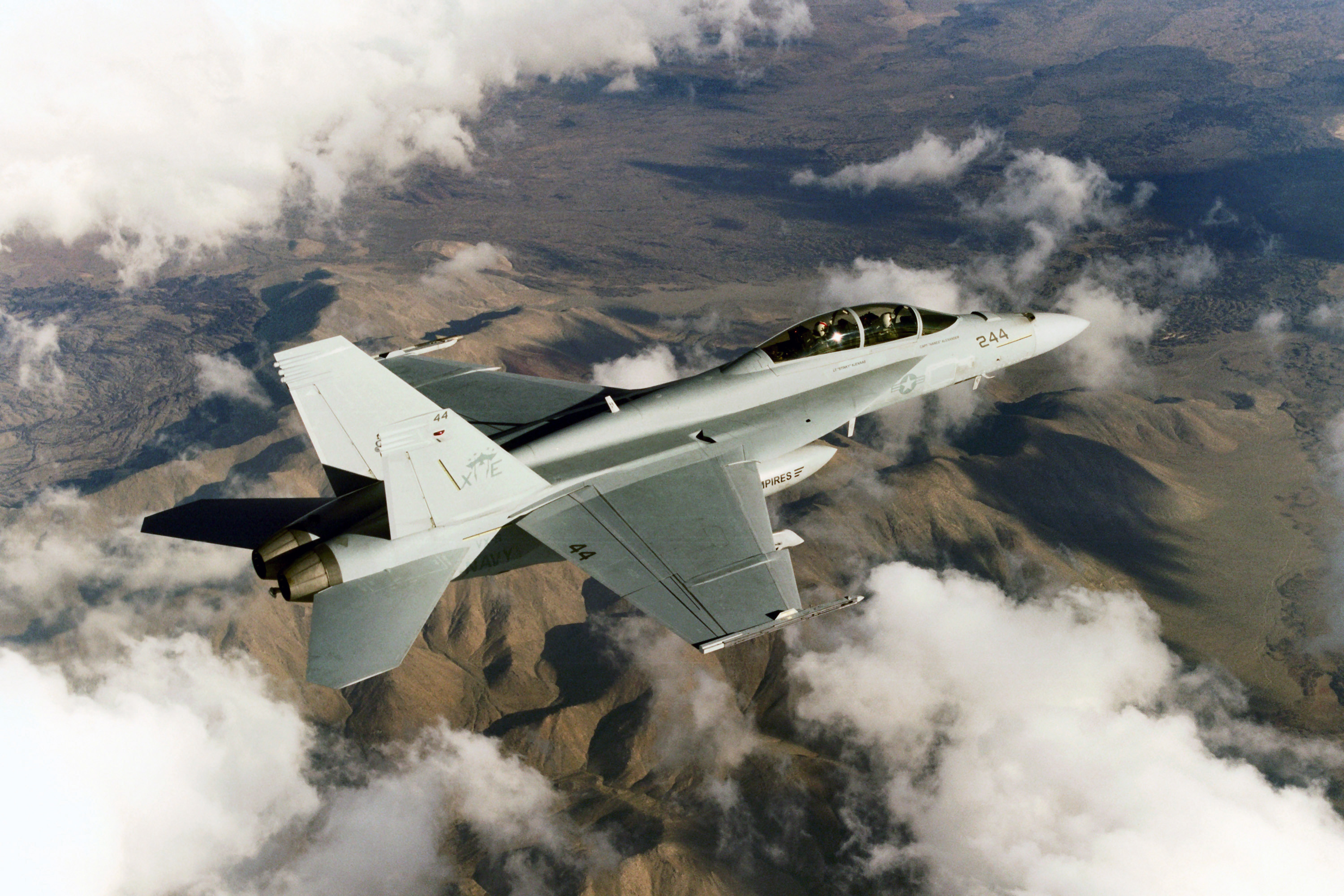
A VX-9 F/A-18 Super Hornet fitted with an APG-79 Active Electronically Scanned Array radar for evaluation.

== Current operations ==
Today, VX-9 has approximately 61 officers, 290 enlisted personnel, and 24 aircraft at NAWS China Lake including: the F/A-18E/F Super Hornet and the EA-18G Growler.

Until the retirement of the F-14 Tomcat, the unit also had 4 F-14As, 3 F-14Bs and 4 F-14Ds at NAS Point Mugu. Although the Point Mugu detachment has ceased operations, a new VX-9 detachment has since been established at Edwards AFB, California for the F-35C Lightning II.

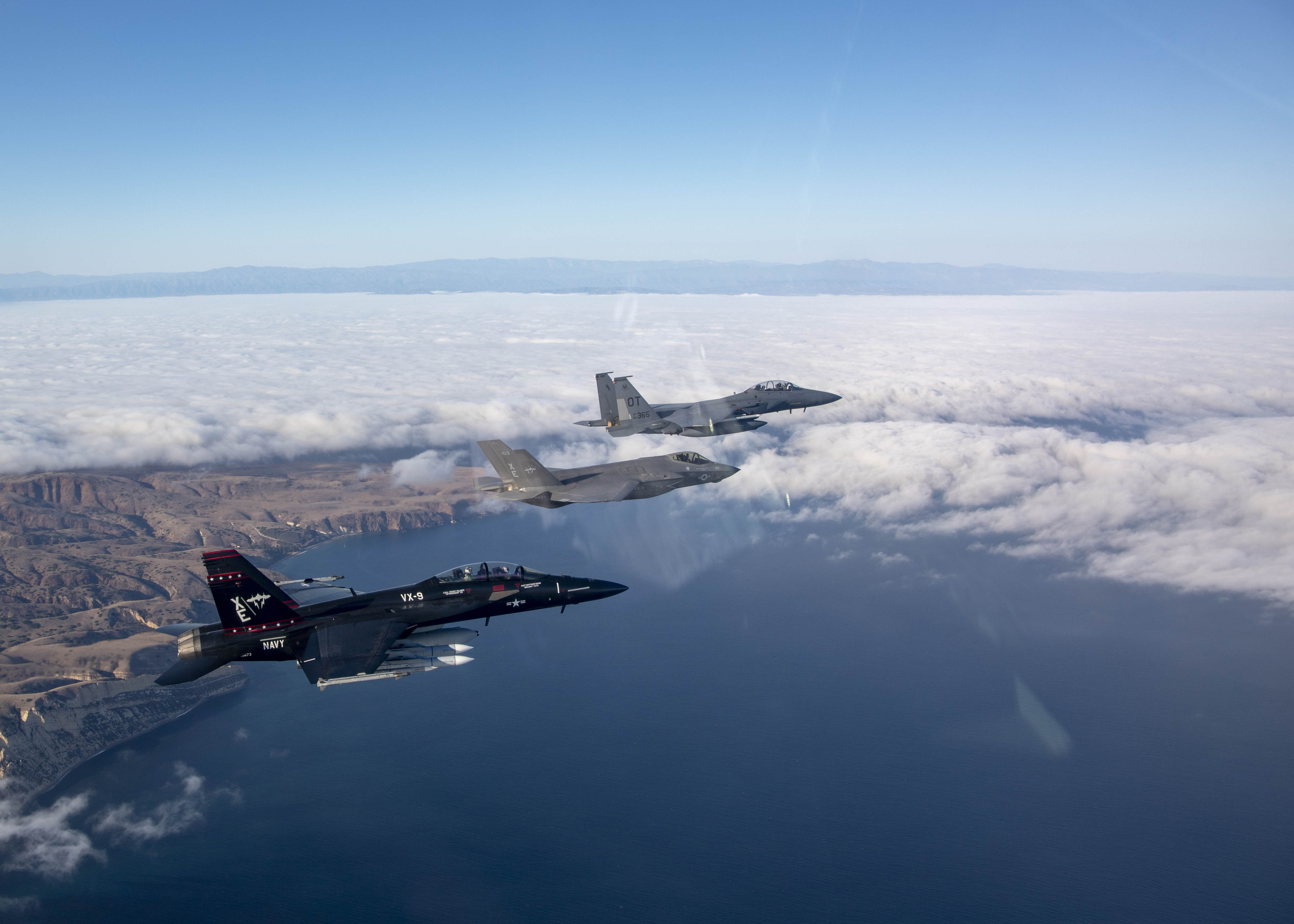
VX-9 Aircraft including an F/A-18F Super Hornet and F-35C Lightning II flying over Point Mugu alongside a USAF F-15

Typically, aircrews are qualified in more than one of these aircraft types, which increases their versatility and provides a broader base of expertise that can be applied to each project. VX-9's mission has grown to include the operational evaluation of attack, fighter, and electronic warfare aircraft, weapons systems and equipment, and to develop tactical procedures for their employment.

As for the chain of command, operationally, VX-9 reports to Commander, Operational Test and Evaluation Force (COMOPTEVFOR) and administratively to Commander, U.S. Naval Air Force, Pacific Fleet (COMNAVAIRPAC).

== See also ==
- History of the United States Navy
- List of United States Navy aircraft squadrons
