= VX-4 =

Air Test and Evaluation Squadron 4
- Active: 1952 to 30 September 1994
- Country: United States
- Branch: United States Navy
- Garrison/HQ: Naval Air Station Point Mugu
- Nickname(s): "The Evaluators"

VX-4, Air Test and Evaluation Squadron Four (AIRTEVRON FOUR), commonly referred to by its nickname of The Evaluators, was a United States Navy air test and evaluation squadron based at Naval Air Station Point Mugu, California. Their tail code was XF, and they flew the McDonnell Douglas F-4 Phantom, Grumman F-14 Tomcat and the McDonnell Douglas F/A-18 Hornet until their disestablishment in 1994.

== History ==
There were two squadrons which used the designation VX-4. The first was established in 1946 as Experimental and Development squadron Four at NAS Quonset Point equipped with PB-1Ws to evaluate and develop Airborne Early Warning equipment and procedures. In 1950 it relocated to NAS Atlantic City as Air Development Squadron four. The squadron moved to NAS Patuxent River in 1951 where it was disestablished later the year due to the lapse of assigned projects.

The second squadron to carry the VX-4 designation was established in 1952 at NAS Point Mugu to conduct evaluations of air-launched guided missiles as assigned by the Commander, Operational Test and Evaluation Force. That squadron is the subject of this article.

In 1960 the squadron began to include additional projects that were not associated with guided missiles. Projects such as the operational test and terrain clearance radar, Doppler navigation systems, and air-to-air distance measuring equipment were included in the squadron's tasks.

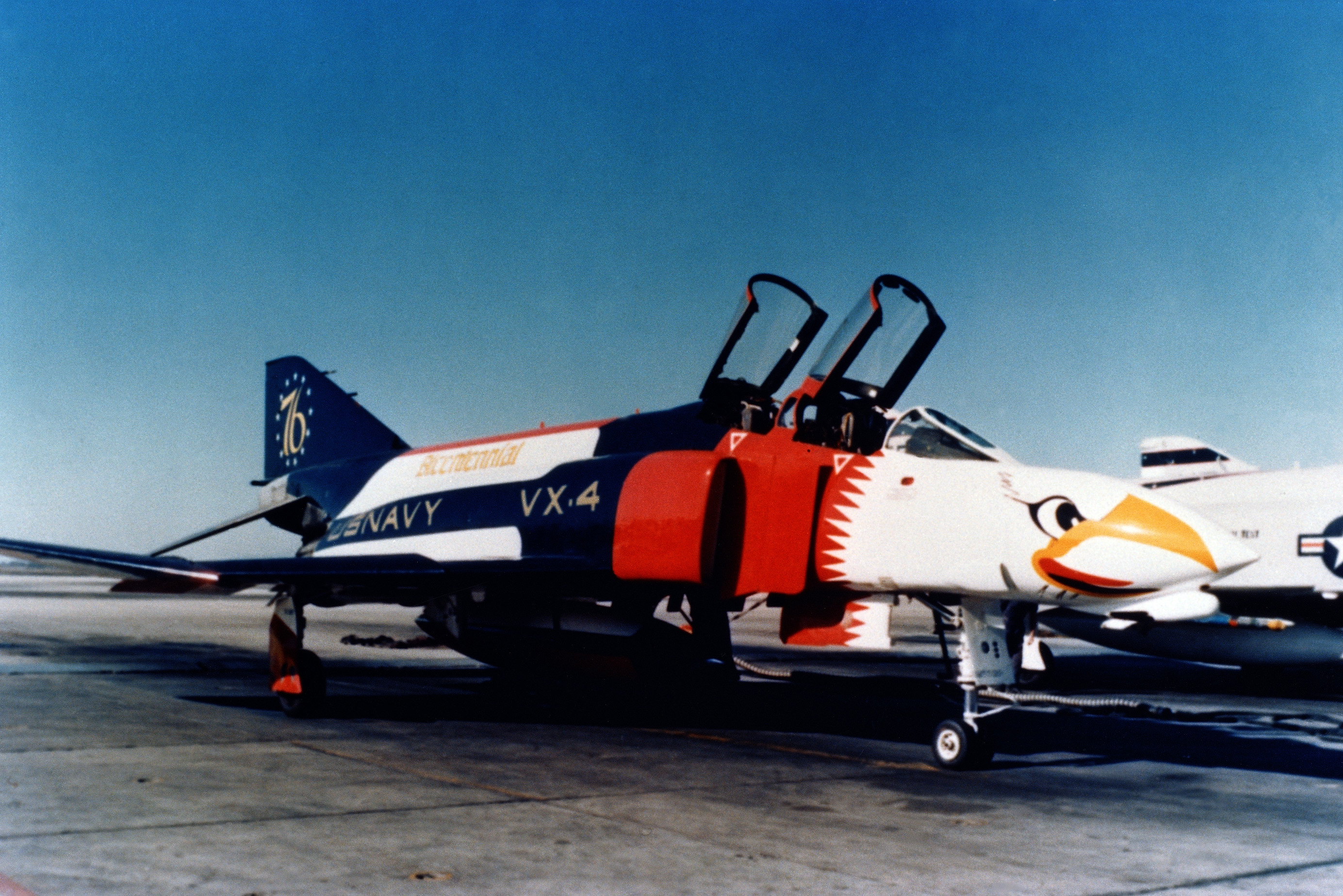
The YF-4J Phantom II prototype from VX-4, painted with a USA bicentennial theme

VX-4 flew aircraft that were currently in operational service with the US Navy, and began their life with the Chance Vought F7U Cutlass. Later they transitioned to the McDonnell Douglas F3D Skyknight, redesignated F-10. With the AIM-7 Sparrow missile being used, the North American FJ Fury, Douglas A-4 Skyhawk and the McDonnell F3H Demon replaced the Cutlass and the Skynight. When the AIM-9 Sidewinder came about, the F-8 Crusader was introduced to VX-4, and in the early 1960s the F-4 Phantom II made its debut with VX-4. In the early 1970s the F-14A Tomcat arrived and when the F/A-18 Hornet came to the fleet, it appeared with VX-4 as well, plus newer variants of the F-14 Tomcat.

Operational tests and evaluation of airborne fighter weapons systems included the AIM-7 Sparrow, AIM-9 Sidewinder and the AIM-54 Phoenix missiles as well as radar warning devices and self-protection jammers.

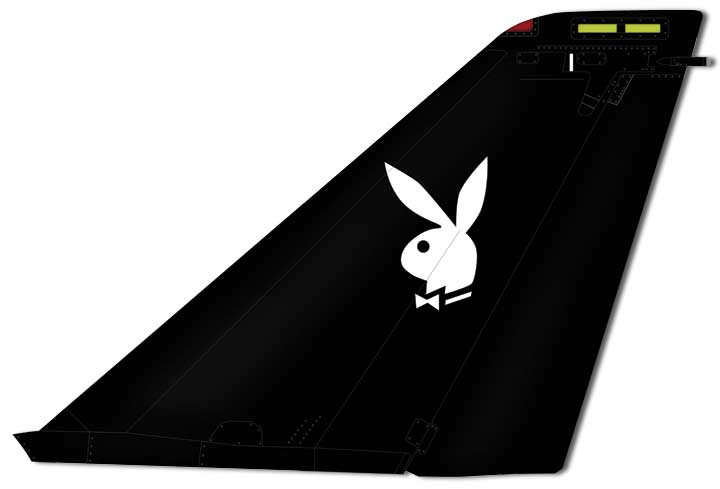
VX-4 F-14 tail markings

January 1990 marked the end of the F-4 Phantom after nearly three decades of service with VX-4 and a few months later the F-14D Super Tomcat arrived. Also the same year they supervised the first operational test of the F-14D and the T-45 Goshawk. Throughout the year VX-4 developed tactics for the ALR-67 radar warning receiver and contributed the system's incorporation in the F-14. VX-4 also began developing tactics for the employment of the AIM-120 AMRAAM missile.

After Iraq's invasion of Kuwait in August 1990 and the Gulf War in 1991, VX-4 was instrumental in the identification of deficiencies, testing and fielding of fixes to fighter weapons systems during Desert Shield, Desert Storm and subsequent operations in Southwest Asia. After Desert Storm commenced in January 1991, VX-4 continued to funnel the latest information to the fleet via messages and briefings presented by VX-4 aircrews deployed aboard carriers in the Red Sea and northern Arabian Sea.

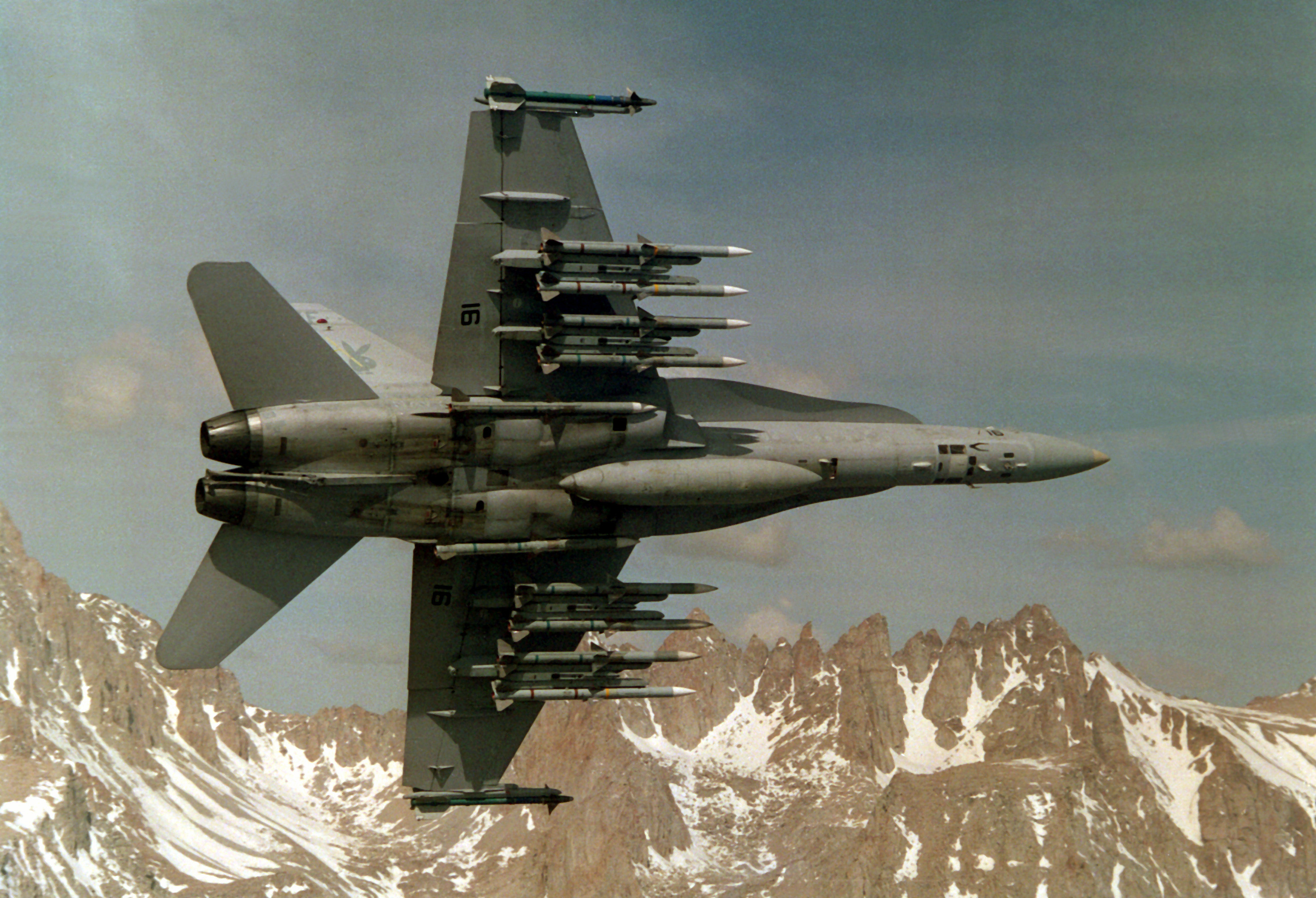
A VX-4 F/A-18 Hornet loaded with ten AMRAAM and two sidewinders

After Desert Storm, the tempo at VX-4 returned to a more normal pace. AMRAAM testing aboard F/A-18, which began in 1991 and continued throughout the year. Evaluation of the F-14D, that had begun in 1990, likewise continued. Other 1991 projects included testing the Swedish BOL chaff dispenser on the F-14, various Sidewinder, Sparrow and Phoenix missile evaluations and Infra-red search and track set tests on the F-14D. ALR-67 (ECP-510) testing in the F/A-18 was one of the squadron's more significant projects in late 1991 and 1992. AMRAAM testing was finally completed in early 1994.

By late 1993, Hornet testing was winding down at VX-4 and preparations were underway for the transfer of all F/A-18 projects and F/A-18C/D aircraft to VX-5 at China Lake as an initial step in the consolidation of the two squadrons. The first Hornet departed for China Lake before the end of 1993, with the remainder of the squadron's aircraft following in early 1994. On 30 September 1994, VX-4 was disestablished and its assets were reassigned to VX-9 (Detachment Point Mugu) Vampires.

== See also ==
- History of the United States Navy
- List of inactive United States Navy aircraft squadrons
- List of United States Navy aircraft squadrons
