= USS Constellation (CV-64) =

Kitty Hawk–class aircraft carrier

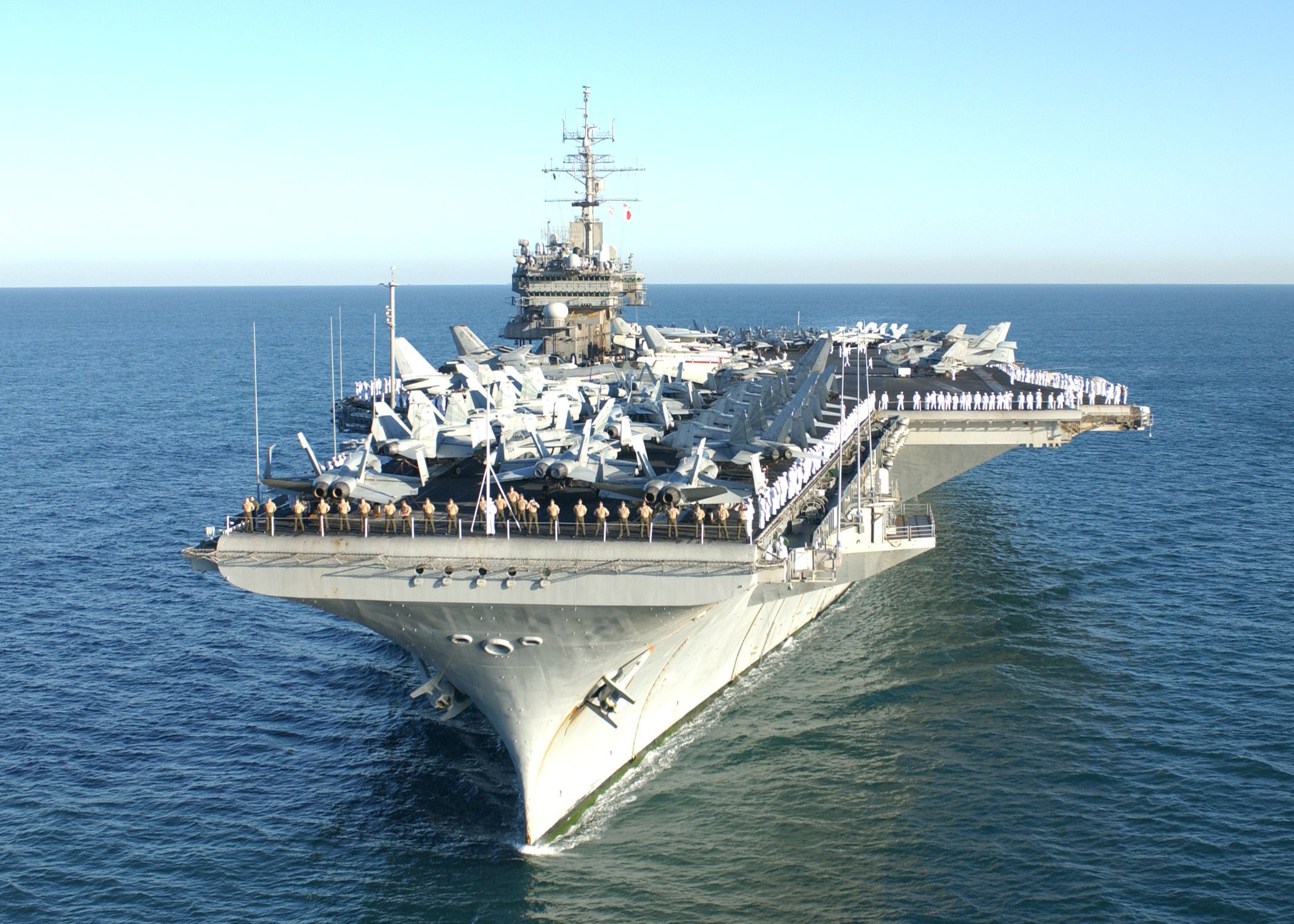
- USS Constellation in April 2003

History

United States
- Name: Constellation
- Namesake: USS Constellation
- Awarded: 1 July 1956
- Builder: Brooklyn Navy Yard
- Cost: US$264.5 million
- Laid down: 14 September 1957
- Launched: 8 October 1960
- Acquired: 1 October 1961
- Commissioned: 27 October 1961
- Decommissioned: 6 August 2003
- Reclassified: CV-64, 30 June 1975
- Stricken: 2 December 2003
- Identification: Callsign: NNUL; Hull number: CVA-64
- Nickname(s): Connie, "America's Flagship"
- Fate: Scrapped, 10 May 2017
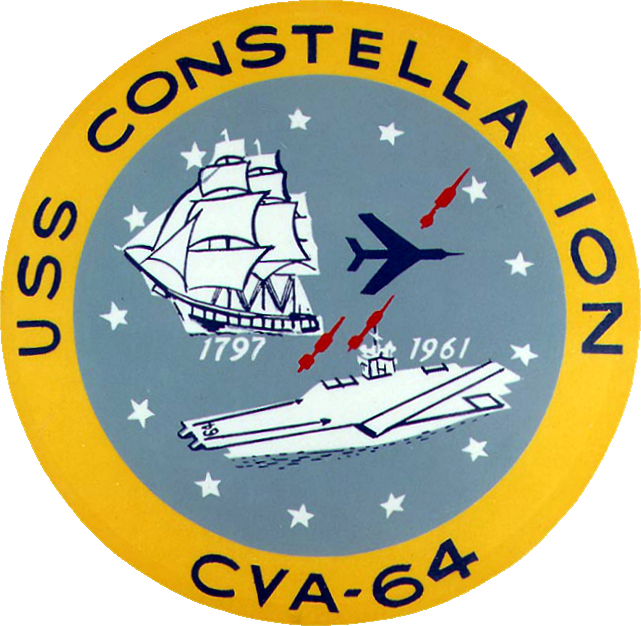
- Badge

General characteristics
- Class & type: Kitty Hawk-class aircraft carrier
- Displacement: 61,981 short tons (56,228 t) light; 82,538 short tons (74,877 t) full load; 20,557 short tons (18,649 t) dead
- Length: 1,088 ft (332 m) overall; 990 ft (300 m) waterline
- Beam: 252 ft (77 m) extreme; 130 ft (40 m) waterline
- Draft: 39 ft (12 m)
- Propulsion: eight boilers, four steam turbine engines, totaling 280,000 shp (210 MW)
- Speed: 34 knots (63 km/h; 39 mph)
- Complement: 3,150; Air Wing: 2,480
- Armament: 2 × Sea Sparrow missile launchers; 3 × 20 mm Phalanx CIWS guns; Formerly: Terrier surface-to-air missile systems
- Aircraft carried: 72 (approx)

USS Constellation (hull number CVA-64/CV-64) was a Kitty Hawk-class supercarrier and the third ship of the United States Navy to be named in honor of the "new constellation of stars" on the flag of the United States. One of the fastest ships in the Navy, as proven by her victory during a battlegroup race held in 1985, she was nicknamed "Connie" by her crew and officially as "America's Flagship".

The contract to build Constellation was awarded to the New York Naval Shipyard on 1 July 1956, and her keel was laid down 14 September 1957 at the New York Navy Yard. She was christened and launched 8 October 1960, sponsored by Mary Herter (wife of Secretary of State Christian Herter). Constellation was delivered to the Navy 1 October 1961, and commissioned on 27 October 1961, with Captain T. J. Walker in command. At that time, she had cost about US$264.5 million. Constellation was the last conventional U.S. aircraft carrier (as of January 2021) to be built at a yard other than Newport News Shipbuilding & Drydock Company. Constellation was scrapped at Brownsville, Texas, in 2015–2017.

== History ==
The keel of Constellation was laid down at New York Naval Shipyard in 1957.

=== Fire during construction ===
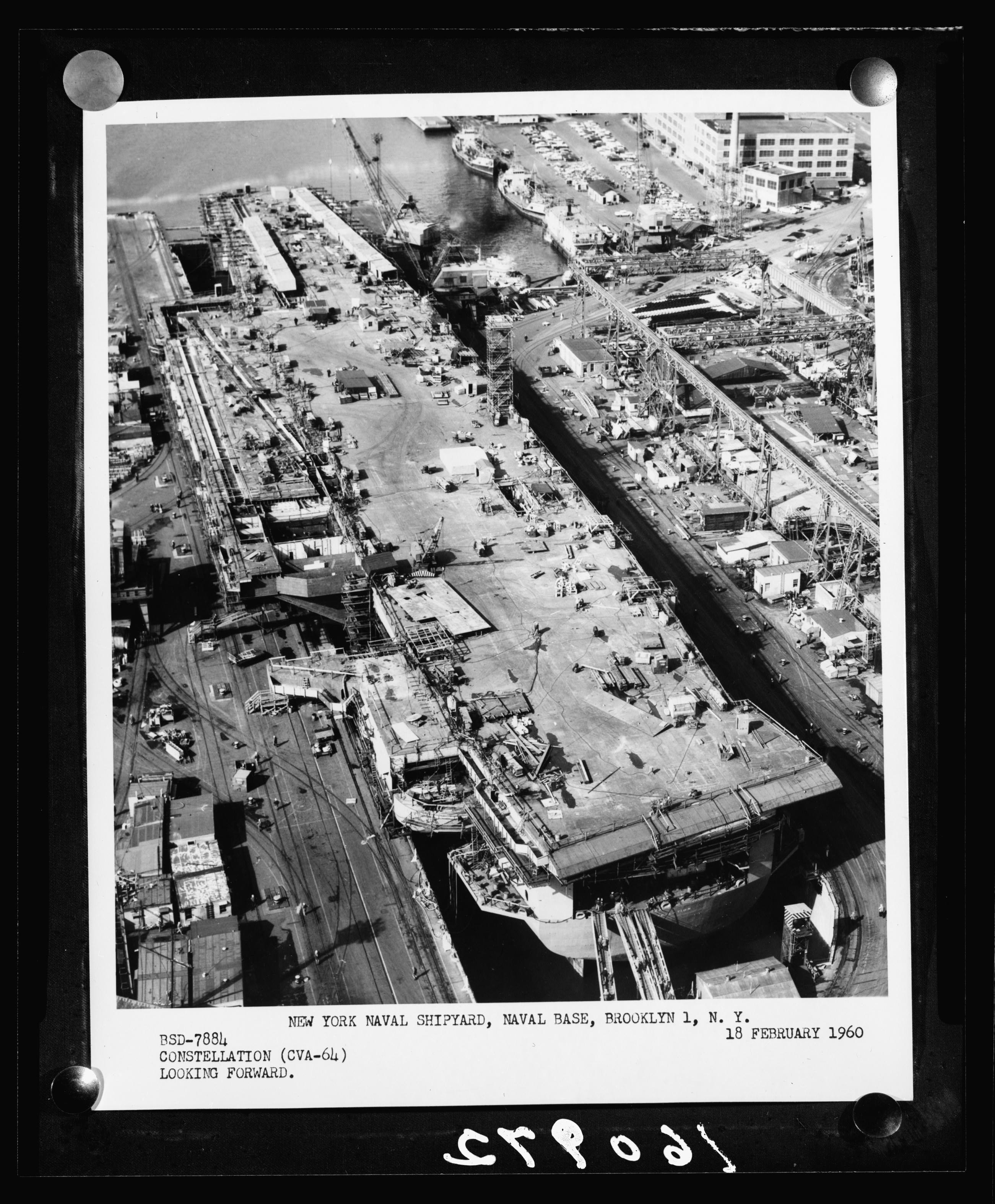
Constellation under construction at the Brooklyn Navy Yard in February 1960

USS Constellation was heavily damaged by fire while under construction on 19 December 1960. The carrier was in the final stages of construction at the Brooklyn Navy Yard in Brooklyn, New York when the fire began.

The fire broke out when a forklift operating on the hangar deck accidentally pushed its cargo into a steel plate knocking it over. The plate then broke off the plug of a 500 US gallons (1,900 L; 420 imp gal) tank of diesel fuel which spilled from the container reaching the lower levels of the ship. The fuel was ignited perhaps by a cutting torch of a fitter, and then moved to a wooden scaffolding. The flames spread quickly, filling the passageways of the ship with smoke. A Navy commander commented on the nature of the ship's design at an inquiry, "Ships of this class are the most complex structures ever designed by man."

It took 17 hours for firefighters to extinguish the fire, some of whom had been "driven to the raw edge of exhaustion" after being called into service in the Park Slope air accident. The firefighters saved hundreds of lives without losing any of their own; however, 50 shipyard workers were killed. The extensive damage cost $75 million to repair, and delayed the commissioning date by seven months, leading to a rumor that the ship that had burned in New York was Kitty Hawk (CV-63) and the fire caused the Navy to change the names and hull number designations between the two sister ships that were being built simultaneously in separate shipyards in separate states. An abstract of a New York Times article from the day after the fire, 20 December 1960, refers to the ship as USS Constellation.

=== 1960–1969 ===
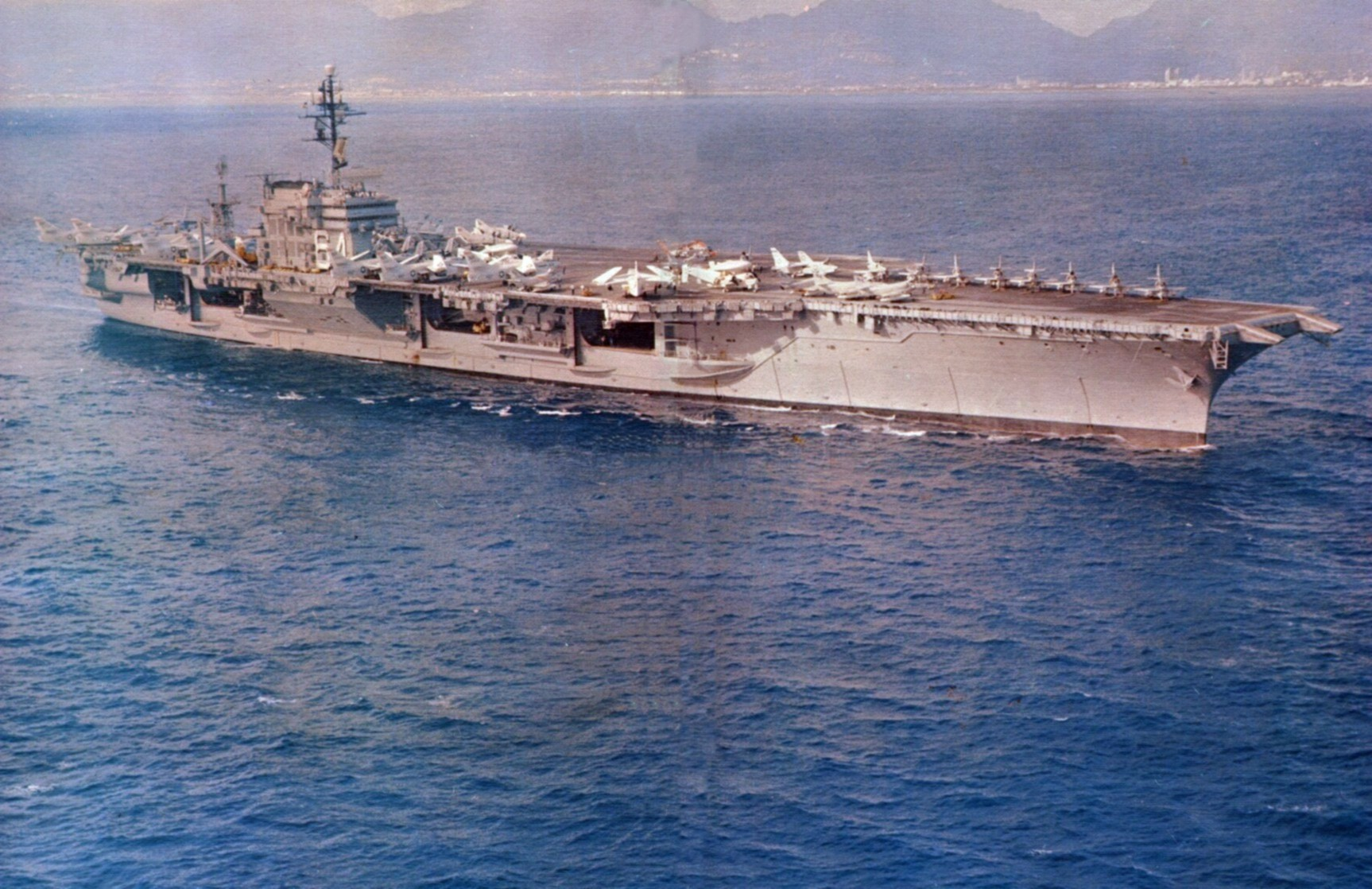
Constellation during her 1964–1965 WESTPAC cruise

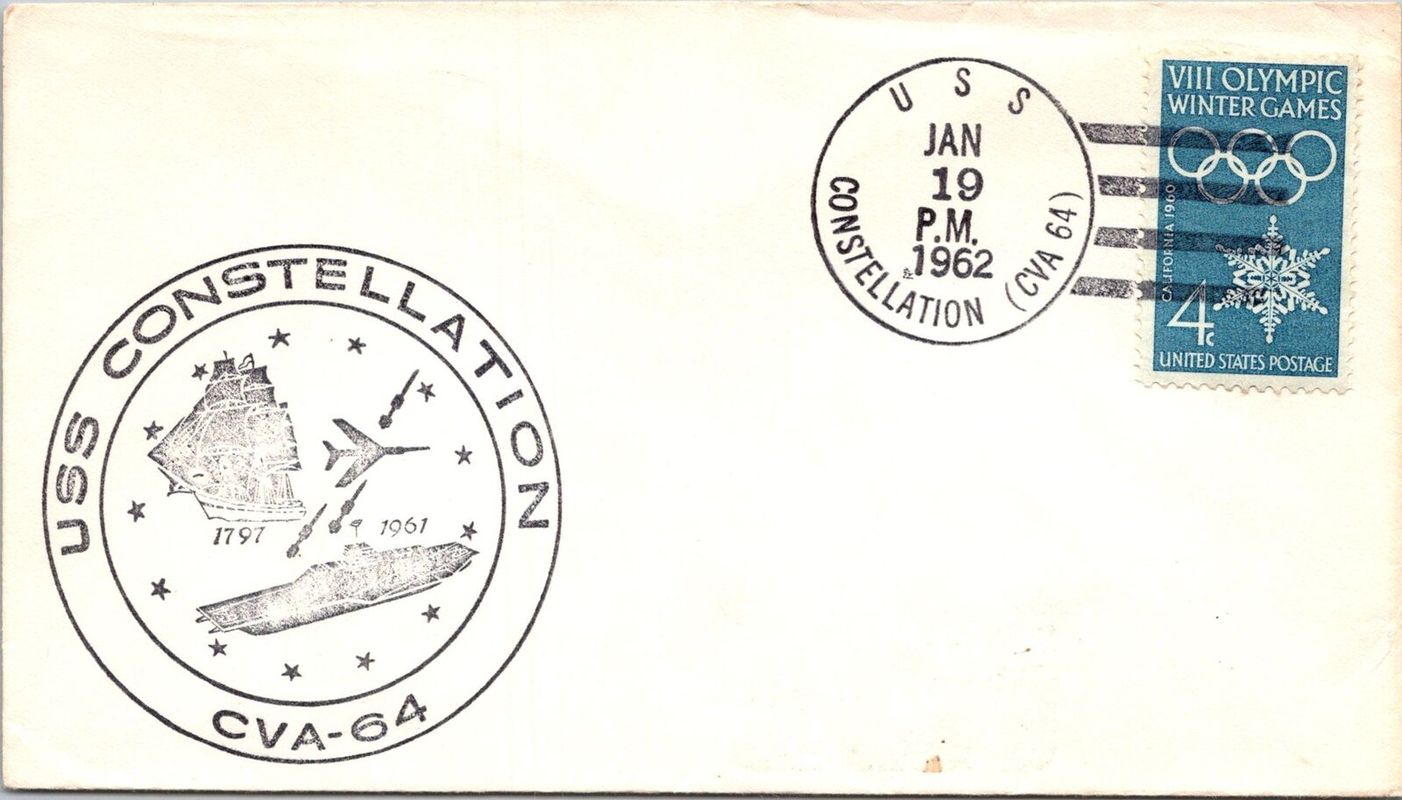
USS Constellation, naval cover, with ship's postmark, 19 January 1962

Constellation was launched 8 October 1960, and she was delivered to the Navy 1 October 1961. She was commissioned on 27 October 1961, with Captain T. J. Walker in command. Another fire occurred aboard Constellation on 7 November 1961, while she was being tested at sea, killing four and injuring nine others.

Following fitting out and acceptance trials, Constellation departed her home port of Norfolk, Virginia, on 7 February 1962 for initial air operations off the Virginia Capes. She conducted her first catapult launch and arrested landing the same day with Commander George C. Watkins, air group (CVG) 13 commander, at the controls of an A4D-2 Skyhawk of Attack Squadron 34. After a month of operating locally, Connie (as the carrier became known) conducted a two-month shakedown cruise in the Caribbean Sea.

In summer 1962, Constellation was transferred to the U.S. Pacific Fleet and CVG-13 was disestablished. For the two-month trip around Cape Horn to her new home port of San Diego, California, Constellation embarked elements of CVG-5 and departed Mayport, Florida, on 25 July. In November Constellation, with CVG-14 on board, commenced workup exercises for her upcoming maiden deployment to the western Pacific as a component of the U.S. Seventh Fleet. The uneventful cruise took place from February to September 1963.

Constellation's second deployment began on 5 May 1964. She relieved Kitty Hawk on station in the Gulf of Tonkin off Vietnam on 8 June, embarked Carrier Air Wing (CVW) 14 (air groups had been redesignated air wings on 20 December 1963) and flew armed photo reconnaissance missions over Laos until 13 July. Following an upkeep period at Subic Bay, Philippines, Constellation reached Hong Kong for a port visit on 27 July, but within a few days was called back into action.

As a result of orders received during the first day of the Gulf of Tonkin Incident (2 August 1964), Constellation got underway and headed toward the Gulf of Tonkin. On 4 August, Constellation launched F-4B Phantom IIs to join aircraft from Ticonderoga in providing air cover over the destroyers which were alleged by the Johnson administration to have been attacked by North Vietnamese torpedo boats. On 5 August both carriers launched Operation Pierce Arrow, a series of air strikes on a North Vietnamese oil facility and naval vessels. CVW-14 lost two aircraft, an A-1 Skyraider, piloted by Lieutenant (junior grade) Richard C. Sather, who was killed in action (KIA), and an A-4 Skyhawk flown by Lieutenant (junior grade) Everett Alvarez Jr., who became one of the United States' first prisoners of war (POW) of the Vietnam War. Operations returned to a more normal cycle for the remainder of the deployment, and Constellation returned to San Diego on 1 February 1965, ending a nearly nine-month cruise. Connie and CVW-14 were awarded a Navy Unit Commendation (NUC) for the early August operations. During the deployment, Constellation appears to have been under the direction of Commander Carrier Division 9.

A first shipyard period for Constellation followed, lasting eight months; then workups commenced for her first full-blown war cruise. The carrier, with CVW-15 on board, was underway for operations off Vietnam in May 1966. During 111 days on station, aircraft from Constellation pounded roads, bridges and other targets, attempting to impede the flow of men and war materials south. The F-4B aircrew of pilot Lieutenant William M. McGunigan and radar intercept officer Lieutenant (junior grade) Robert M. Fowler from Fighter Squadron 161 (VF-161) shot down a MiG-17 fighter jet on 13 July, marking the ship's first MiG kill of the war. Constellation returned to San Diego in December after her seven-month combat cruise, having lost 16 aircrewmen and 15 aircraft. Subsequently, both Constellation and CVW-15 were awarded a NUC for this deployment.

Constellation circa 1999

After a short workup cycle, Constellation's third combat deployment commenced in April 1967. With CVW-14 embarked, the carrier operated first on Dixie Station (a patrol area about 60 miles (97 km) off South Vietnam) with strikes in the Iron Triangle region, and then moved north to Yankee Station (a patrol area about 50 miles (80 km) off North Vietnam) for a total of 121 days on the line. Reflecting the intensive nature of air operations, F-4Bs of VF 142 and VF 143 accounted for four MiG kills. The eight-month deployment ended in December, having totaled losses of 16 aircraft and 20 personnel, including seven KIAs and eight POWs. Both the carrier and CVW-14 received a NUC.

Constellation began her fourth deployment to the western Pacific and Vietnam on 29 May 1968. During this deployment, the Constellation/CVW-14 team was restricted to strikes below the 20th parallel of North Vietnam as a result of a March Presidential order. On 1 November, as directed by President Johnson, all bombing of North Vietnam was halted at 21:00 Saigon time. The last Navy mission over the restricted area was flown earlier in the day by Cmdr. Kenneth E. Enney in an A-7 Corsair II. Constellation returned to homeport to on 31 January 1969, after flying more than 11,000 combat and support missions and dropping almost 20,000 tons of ordnance. Fifteen aircraft were destroyed, nine due to enemy action. Six aircrew members perished, five were listed as KIAs and three were taken as POW.

By August, it was time for Constellation to return to Vietnam for a fifth combat deployment, again with CVW-14. Following an initial 20-day period of supporting strikes in South Vietnam as well as Laos, Constellation sailed to Defender Station in the Sea of Japan, which had been created as a result of increased tensions on the Korean Peninsula. On 2 October 1969, there was an accident caused when the tail rotor came off of a helicopter just before landing on the flight deck. Nine men went down with the chopper and were never recovered. A return to Yankee Station on 1 November also produced a major milestone in the carrier's life when the F-4J aircrew of air wing skipper Commander R. K. Billings and Lieutenant (junior grade) Jeff Taylor of VF-143 conducted Connie's 100,000th arrested landing. During a mission on 28 March 1970, the VF-142 F-4 crew of Lieutenant Jerome E. Beaulier and Lieutenant Steven J. Barkley downed a North Vietnamese MiG-21 jet fighter. Following a total of 128 days on the line, Constellation's nine-month deployment ended in May, with CVW-14 suffering the loss of seven total aircraft, five to enemy action. One member of the aircrew was taken as a POW, but there were no fatalities.

=== 1970–1979 ===
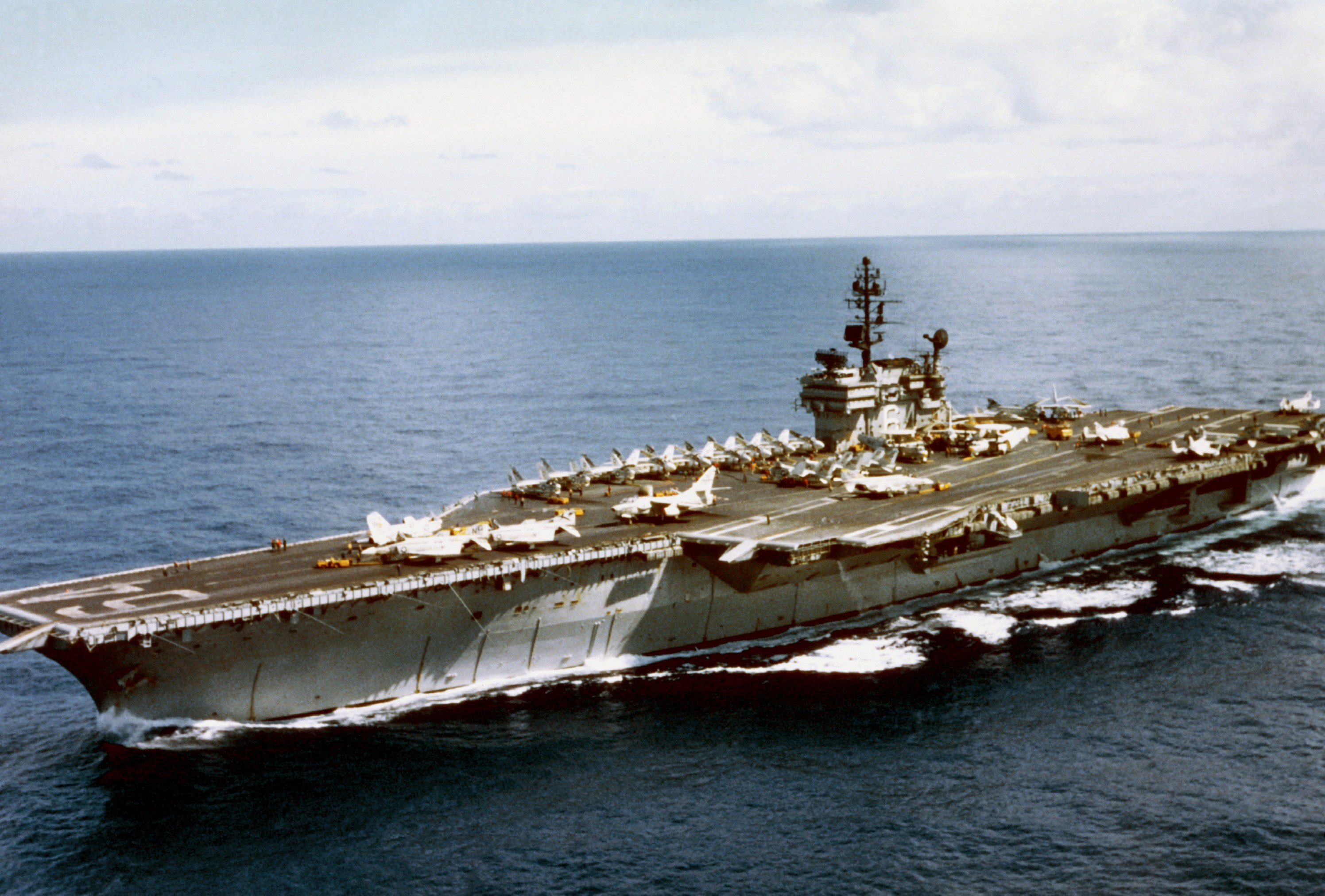
Constellation underway off Vietnam, 1971–1972

Upon her return Constellation began a nine-month major shipyard overhaul, her second since commissioning. In spring 1971 she welcomed aboard a new air wing, CVW-9, and departed San Diego on 1 October for what would become a historic combat deployment. Air operations commenced with strikes against mainly logistic targets in Laos as well as reconnaissance missions over North Vietnam into 1972. On 19 January, the VF-96 F-4 Phantom crew of Lieutenant Randall H. "Duke" Cunningham and Lieutenant (junior grade) William P. Driscoll scored a kill against a MiG-21, the first for a Navy aircraft since Connie's VF-142 kill on 28 March 1970. The carrier was nearing the end of her scheduled deployment when her tour was extended to meet the threat posed by the North Vietnamese Easter Offensive.

Initial air strikes in support of ground troops were followed by a new, more intensive series of air strikes against major targets in North Vietnam. On 8 May, the same VF-96 aircrew team of Cunningham and Driscoll scored against a MiG-17. Then on 10 May, Cunningham and Driscoll downed three MiG-17s, becoming the first aces of the Vietnam war. Three more MiG-17s were downed by two other VF-96 crews, two by Lieutenant Michael J. Connelly and Lieutenant Thomas J. Blonski and one by Lieutenant Steven C. Shoemaker and Lieutenant (junior grade) Keith V. Crenshaw. Adding to the score, VF-92 aircrew Lieutenant Curt Dose and Lieutenant Commander James McDevitt shot down a MiG-21. All told, Constellation fliers shot down seven MiGs on 10 May. The nine-month deployment ended on 1 July, the carrier having spent 154 days off Vietnam. Seven aircraft were lost, two aircrewmen were reported KIA and two became POWs. The Constellation/CVW-9 team received the Presidential Unit Citation for their outstanding efforts.

==== Focus of antiwar activity ====
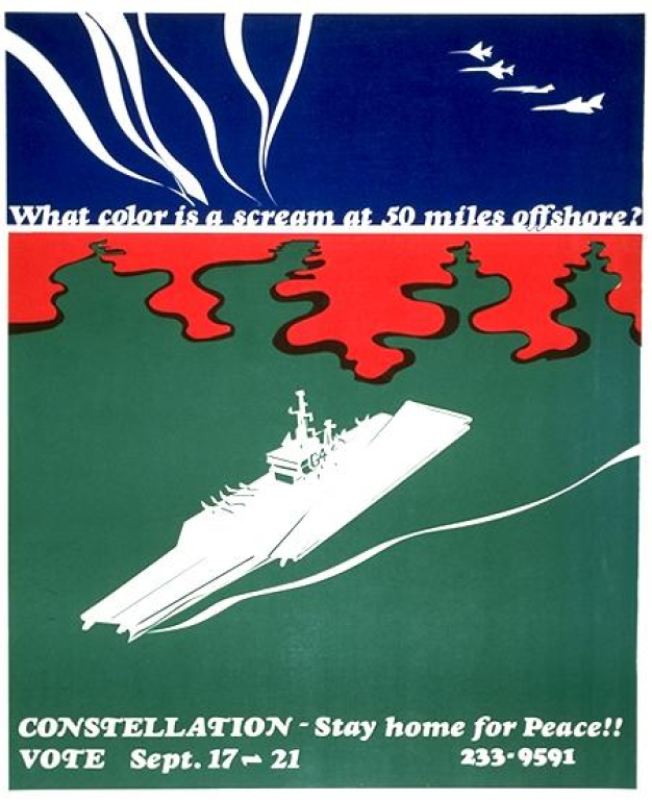
Poster used for the Constellation Vote

In 1971 Constellation became the target of significant antiwar activity in her homeport of San Diego. Two anti-Vietnam War groups, the Concerned Officers Movement and San Diego Nonviolent Action organized a Constellation Vote which became a major antiwar campaign over several months. It led to a citywide straw vote in late September 1971 with 54,721 votes counted. Over 82% of voters elected to keep the ship home, including 73% of the military personnel who voted. While not a "real" vote, the impact on public opinion was appreciable. The commander-in-chief of the Pacific Fleet was quoted as saying "never was there such a concerted effort to entice American servicemen from their posts." This activity was the first of numerous anti-Vietnam War efforts directed against U.S. Navy ships that developed into the larger Stop Our Ship (SOS) movement.

A considerable amount of research was conducted into the role of aircraft carriers in modern warfare by Professor William Watson of MIT who was then a visiting Professor of History at UC San Diego. He argued in a widely distributed pamphlet that aircraft carriers had become weapons "used to crush popular uprisings and to bully the weaker and poorer countries of the world." When Constellation set sail for Vietnam in late 1971, nine of her crew publicly refused to go and took sanctuary in a local Catholic church. The "Connie 9", as they were quickly dubbed, were soon arrested in an early morning raid by US Marshals and flown back to the ship, but within weeks were honorably discharged from the Navy.

==== Black sailor protests ====
Constellation was the focus of media attention when black members of her crew protested what they saw as systemic racism in the Navy, leading to what some saw as an aborted mutiny in late 1972. Constellation returned to the United States on 1 July and prepared to return to the western Pacific in early 1973. Replacement personnel reported aboard while Constellation was in the United States until the ship had 250 more men than the ship's berthing could accommodate. Constellation's commanding officer ordered administrative (less than honorable) discharges for five black sailors he considered troublemakers. He planned to give early discharges to another 250 men whose enlistments would expire while Constellation was overseas. While Constellation was conducting exercises off the California coast, a rumor started that the captain was going to give 250 less than honorable discharges to black sailors. The captain scheduled an open meeting for 21:00 on 3 November to clarify the 250 planned discharges. At noon 3 November a group of 50 black sailors began a sit-in on a portion of the mess deck. On the night of 3–4 November 60 black sailors took control of the scheduled meeting, refused to leave the mess deck, and threatened to "tear up the ship." Constellation returned to San Diego on 4 November to offload 130 men, including twelve white sailors, before returning to sea. It then returned to San Diego on 7 November and the offloaded sailors were transported back to the dock on 9 November, but only eight boarded their ship. The remaining sailors sat down on the dock to be filmed by television crews and were ultimately transferred to shore stations for mast. Twelve received general discharges, 35 were honorably discharged but not recommended for re-enlistment, and 73 received punishments ranging from loss of pay and reduction in rate to warnings prior to being reassigned to sea duty.

==== End of Vietnam War ====
In January 1973, Constellation headed back to Southeast Asia. The Paris Peace Accords took effect on 28 January, but CVW-9 aircraft continued to strike targets in Laos until a cease-fire in that country was called on 21 February. Thus Connie, which had been on station at the beginning of combat operations in Vietnam in 1964, was on station at the end, nine years later. The remainder of the nine-month deployment consisted largely of flights in support of mine-clearing operations in North Vietnam.

Upon her return in October 1973, Constellation enjoyed a nine-month workup cycle, and departed in June 1974 for her first peacetime deployment in 10 years. On 23 November, she became the first carrier to enter the Persian Gulf since 1949. The six-month cruise ended on 24 December 1974.

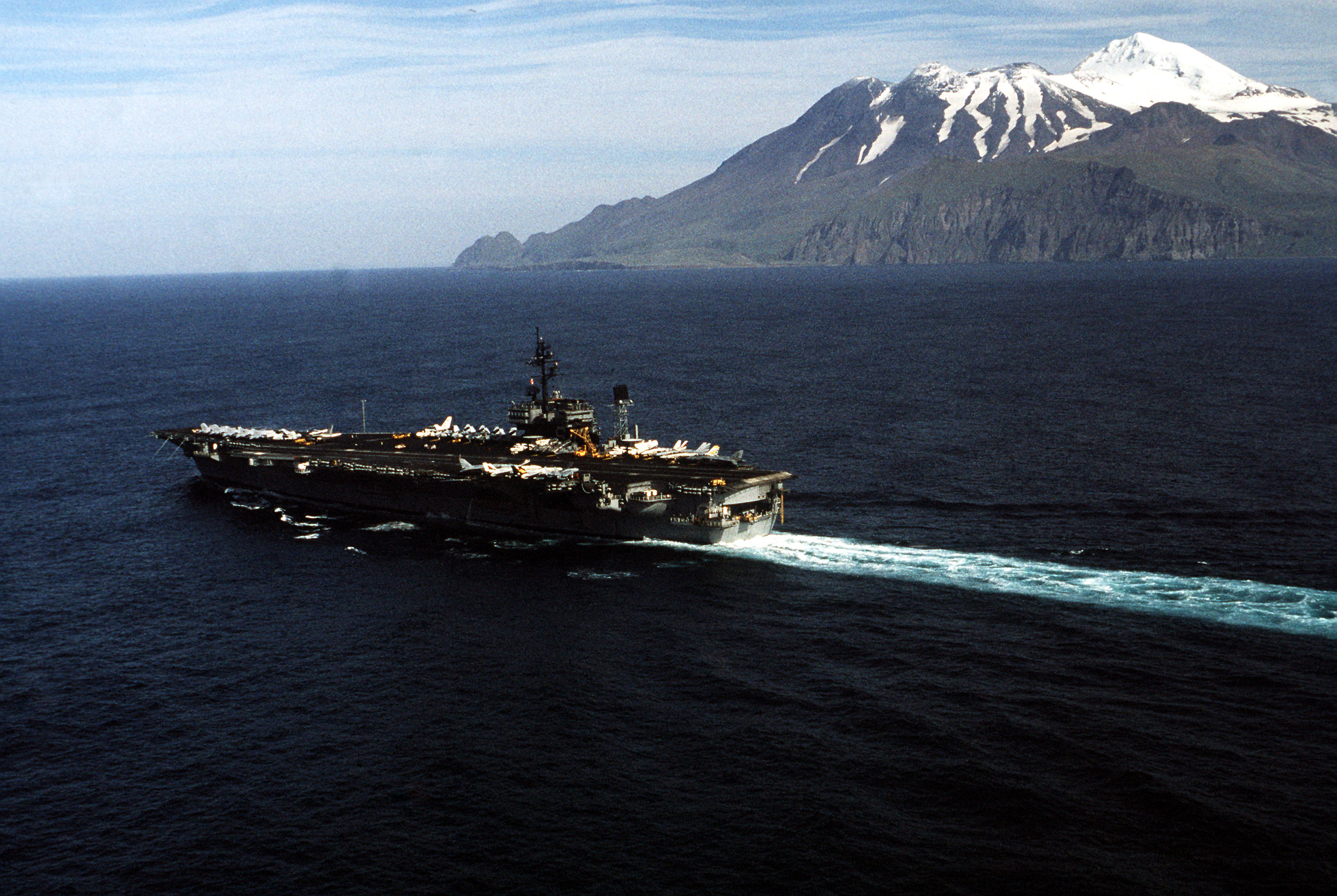
Constellation near the Aleutian Islands during PACEX '89

A 14-month major overhaul and upgrade at Puget Sound Naval Shipyard, Washington, commenced in February 1975, during which Constellation was modified to reflect the Navy's new multipurpose air, surface and antisubmarine warfare role for carriers. She was redesignated a CV on 30 June 1975. With the overhaul completed in April 1976, Connie could now operate both the new S-3A Viking and F-14A Tomcat. However, the workups uncovered problems, and a 26-day drydocking in late 1976 at Long Beach Naval Shipyard, California, was required. The highlight for the remaining workup cycle was participation in Rim of the Pacific (RIMPAC) multinational exercises held in and around the Hawaiian Islands. An uneventful April to November 1977 deployment, Connie's tenth, to the Far East followed.

Constellation's next deployment, from September 1978 to May 1979, was originally scheduled to end in March but was extended due to her sortie into the Indian Ocean in reaction to a political crisis in Yemen. Following a relatively short eight-month turnaround cycle, she was underway again in February 1980 under the command of Captain Leon Edney, USN. After participating in RIMPAC exercises, Constellation steamed westward to the Arabian Sea, where Gonzo Station had been established following the November 1979 takeover of the American Embassy in Tehran, Iran. Connie had reached the eastern Indian Ocean when the unsuccessful 24 April 1980 raid to free American hostages took place, and she relieved Coral Sea on Gonzo Station on 1 May. This at-sea period would last a record-setting 110 days. As a result, the crew of Constellation was awarded the Navy Expeditionary Medal for their service. The deployment ended in mid-October.

=== 1980–1989 ===
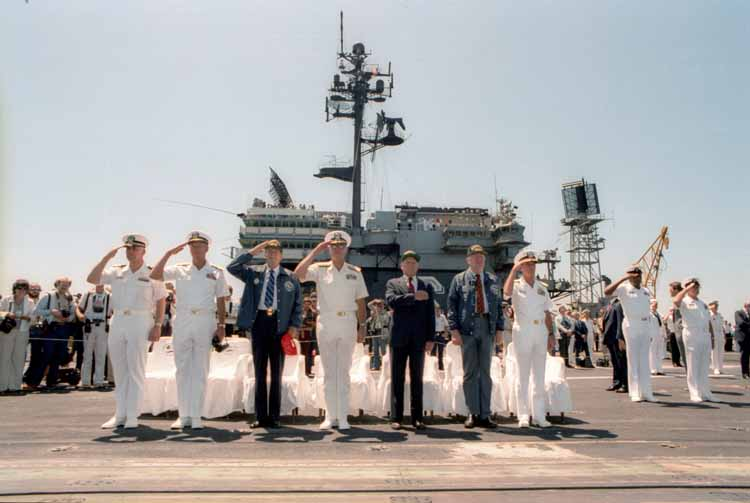
President Ronald Reagan aboard Constellation, 1981

During the 1981 workup cycle President Ronald Reagan visited Constellation on 20 August 1981 and proclaimed the carrier "America's Flagship" while presenting the crew a presidential flag and announcing to the crew: "Let friend and foe alike know that America has the muscle to back up its words, and ships like this and men like you are that muscle." Under the command of Captain Dennis M Brooks USN Constellation sailed to the western Pacific and Indian Ocean from October 1981 to May 1982.

In January 1983, Constellation entered the Puget Sound Naval Shipyard for a 13-month complex overhaul, during which the ship's Terrier missile system was replaced with NATO Sea Sparrow, the Phalanx Close-In Weapon System was added and modifications were made to allow the carrier to operate the new F/A-18A Hornet strike aircraft. Connie deployed from February to August 1985 with CVW-14 embarked, marking the first deployment for the F/A-18. As part of this deployment, Constellation, and escorts including USS Jacksonville (SSN-699), USS Worden (CG-18), USS Camden (AOE-2), USS Crommelin (FFG-37) and USS Fletcher (DD-992), made a port call at Mombasa in Kenya. It was during this deployment that Constellation gained her motto, "Go Ahead Make My Day", which was painted on the ship's island; a direct quote from President Ronald Reagan in response to terrorist threats made against Constellation when she responded to the American hostage crisis of 1985 TWA Flight 847. For their performance in 1985, Constellation's crew earned the Meritorious Unit Citation, and the ship herself received the Secretary of the Navy's Environmental Protection Award.

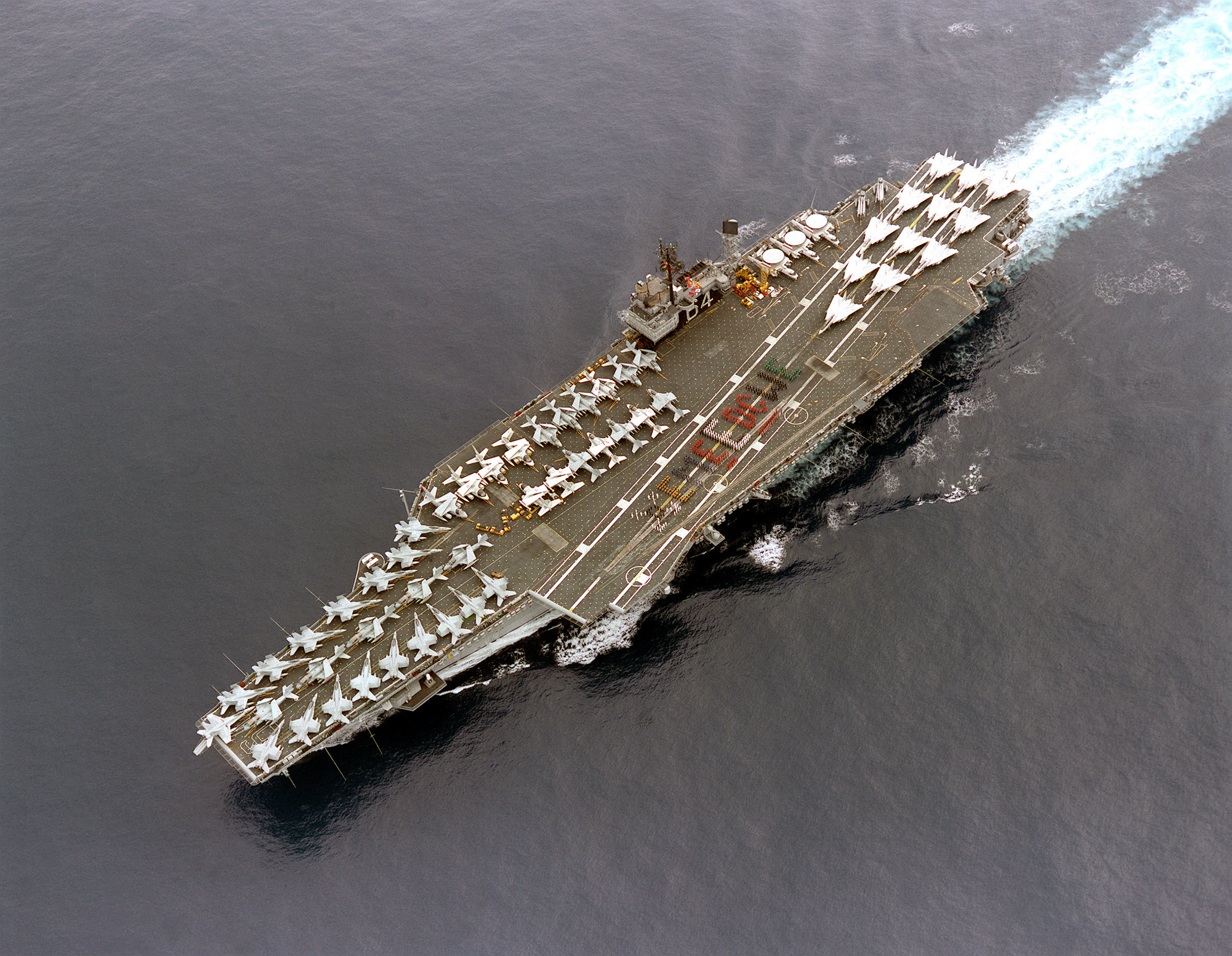
Constellation crew members form Battle E awards on the flight deck.

As preparations for a 1987 deployment proceeded, it was announced that Constellation had earned the coveted Pacific Fleet Battle Efficiency Award (Battle Efficiency E) for the 18-month period ending on 30 June 1986. During an April to October 1987 deployment, Connie conducted air operations in support of Operation Earnest Will, the escorting of re-flagged Kuwaiti tankers in the Persian Gulf as a result of Iranian attacks against international shipping. As a result, the crew of Constellation was awarded the Armed Forces Expeditionary Medal for their service.

On the morning of 2 August 1988 Connie quietly slipped her moorings for a routine two-week carrier qualification off the coast of southern California. Things quickly turned out to be anything but routine. The ship had barely cleared the harbor when a JP-5 fuel leak in the uptakes rained down to number One main machinery room and erupted into a full blown conflagration that tore through the uptakes and spread throughout the ship. The Fuel Oil Supervisor and Oil Lab were blamed early on even though they were not transferring fuel at the time. One Main Top Watch (a Boiler Technician) triggered the halon fire suppression system as he exited the space. Unfortunately the standard procedure was to wait 30 minutes after Halon had been triggered to re-enter the space. When the crew re entered the space was still hot and reignited the fire. Three explosions rocked the ship and the crew went into General Quarters. Amid explosions and extreme heat, volunteers from the crew entered enclosed spaces to extinguish the fires and preserve the ship. Through the damage control efforts of her crew, Connie's main fires were extinguished around 2100. To the crew's horror, the fires reflashed and the crew went back into action.

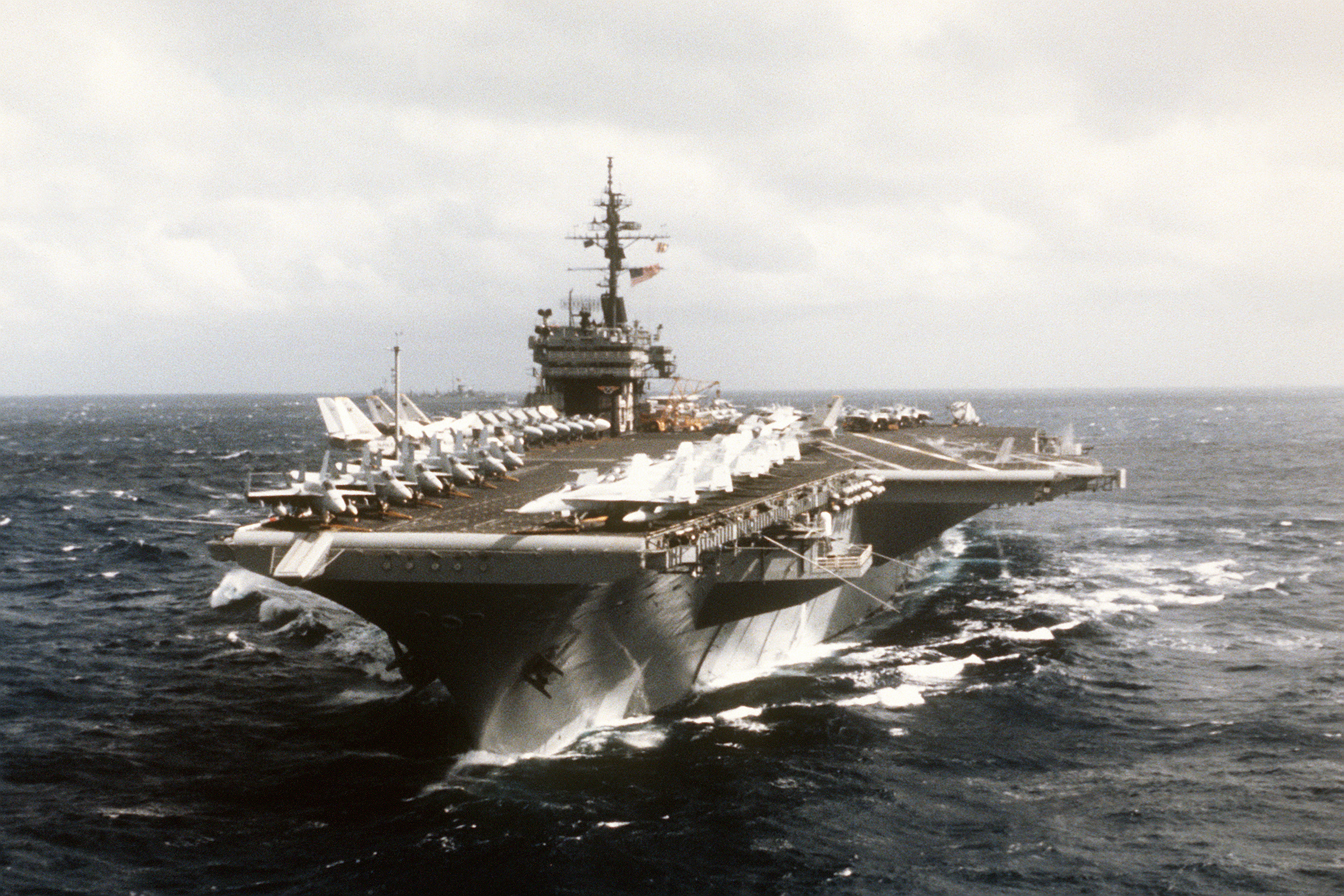
Constellation underway, 1988

Into the next day, the crew battled the blaze that had reflashed and continued to threaten the entire ship. During the conflagration, an over-temperature alarm sounded for the Mt. 23 CIWS 20 mm ammunition magazine. This necessitated the firecontrolmen offloading the magazine contents over the side because low firemain pressure precluded flooding the magazine to cool it. Mt. 23 was situated on the port side of the island just forward of the boiler uptakes. After the long battle fighting the main space and collateral fires, there were no fatalities. There were however some serious injuries ranging from broken bones to smoke inhalation. Connie pulled back into North Island on 3 August. The subsequent investigation showed that there was a problem with a JP-5 pipe leading to a fuel station that wasn't adequately inspected after an in-port maintenance availability period. The problem was that a pipe that had long ago been removed that used to pass through the uptakes was hooked back up. The 6-to-8-inch (150 to 200 mm) pipe in the uptakes just emptied into the uptakes where 1MMR's 6 forced draft blowers sucked the fuel into the running boilers. The total amount of JP-5 pumped into the uptakes was approximately 20,000 gallons.

Round-the-clock repairs by the crew assisted by civilian contractors got the ship ready for deployment, on schedule. The Constellation/CVW-14 team deployed on 1 December 1988 for the Indian Ocean. She left port on three screws with the final repairs to the fourth screw being completed at Subic Bay, Philippines. Four days out to sea, a Prowler and its four crew members were lost at sea. On 13 December, a Harpoon anti-ship missile launched by an F/A-18 fighter from Constellation killed one sailor when it struck the merchant ship Jagvivek, a 250 ft (76 m) long Indian-owned ship, during an exercise at the Pacific Missile Range near Kauai, Hawaii. A Notice to Mariners had been issued warning of the danger, but Jagvivek left port before receiving the communication and subsequently strayed into the test range area, and the Harpoon missile, loaded just with an inert dummy warhead, locked onto it instead of its intended target. The West-Pac deployment ended six months later at San Diego on 1 June 1989.

=== 1990–1999 ===
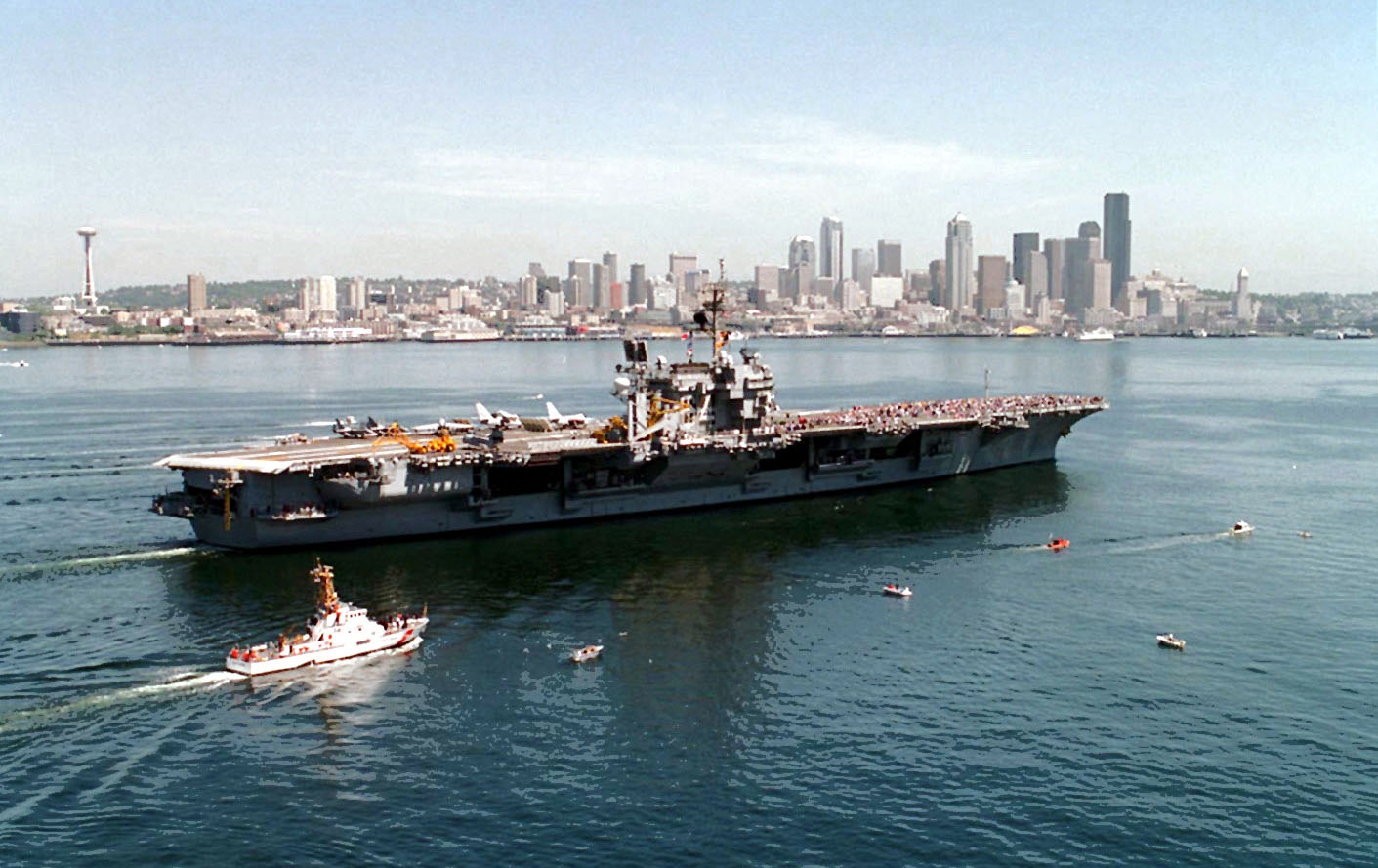
Constellation in Seattle, 1996

With CVW-9 embarked, Connie departed San Diego on 12 February 1990 for the East Coast. Following exercises with the air forces of several South American countries, including Gringo-Gaucho with the Argentine Navy, while en route and preparations at Norfolk, Virginia, Constellation entered Philadelphia Naval Shipyard, Pa., in July to begin an $800-million, three-year Service Life Extension Program (SLEP). Completed in March 1993, the SLEP was a cross between new construction and a comprehensive overhaul, designed to add 15 years to the carrier's operational life. Among other things, her main, largest steam turbines were replaced, an operation that had never been designed into a ship of this size. Constellation conducted her post-SLEP shakedown with a number of CVW-17 squadrons, and then moored at Mayport, Florida, on 8 April.

With CVW-2 assigned, Connie departed Mayport on 29 May and conducted exercises with various South American air forces while en route to San Diego, where she arrived on 22 July 1993. This was one of the first opportunities that female enlisted personnel and officers were assigned temporary additional duty (TAD) to the squadrons to "test" shipboard life before women were officially eligible for assignment on combat ships or duty stations. With a total crew of about 3500 personnel, 80 women were assigned, of which 5 women worked daytime flight deck operations.

During May–June 1994 Connie and CVW-2 participated in RIMPAC exercises, and on 10 November departed San Diego for an extended deployment for the first time in six years. Exercises off Okinawa were followed by a series of exercises off Korea that year following a discovery by U.S intelligence: that North Korea was attempting to develop nuclear weapons. On 11 January 1995, the Constellation battle group entered the Persian Gulf to take up station in support of Operation Southern Watch (OSW), enforcing the no-fly zone over southern Iraq. The six-month deployment concluded with her return to San Diego on 10 May. Effective 1 October 1995, Constellation was assigned to Cruiser-Destroyer Group 1. Constellation's next deployment, from 1 April to 1 October 1997, included a return to the Persian Gulf for Southern Watch, now under control of the United States Fifth Fleet. In over 10 weeks of operating in the Gulf, CVW-2 flew more than 4,400 sorties, with well over 1,000 Southern Watch sorties.

As Connie prepared for her 1999 deployment, tensions were once again rising on the Korean Peninsula following an exchange of gunfire between North and South Korean vessels. Constellation departed San Diego on 18 June 1999 for the Korean Peninsula to monitor the situation. On 28 August, she entered the Persian Gulf and in ten weeks conducted more than 5,000 sorties and 1,256 OSW sorties. This period was highlighted by air strikes against two Iraqi radar stations and an attempt by VF-2 to engage an Iraqi jet with the long-range Phoenix air-to-air missile on 14 September. CVW-2 aircraft engaged in nine specific ordnance-dropping air strikes while in the Persian Gulf. The battle group departed the Persian Gulf on 5 November, and she arrived home for the holidays on 17 December. At the year's end, Constellation was awarded her second Battle Efficiency E as the Pacific Fleet's best carrier for the 12-month reporting period.

=== 2000 onwards ===
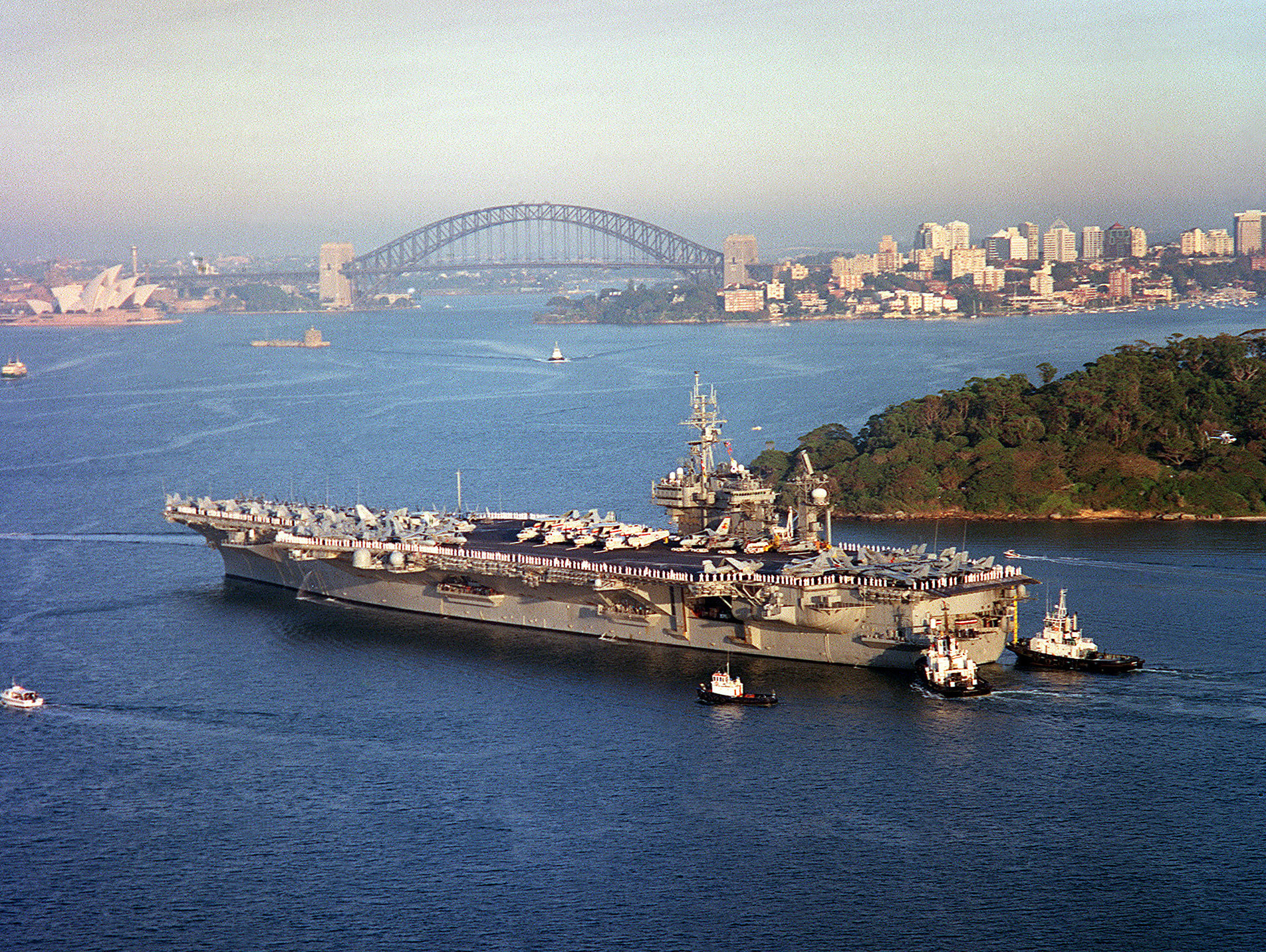
Constellation in Sydney Harbor, 2001

Constellation's 20th deployment began on 16 March 2001. She entered the Persian Gulf on 30 April and immediately commenced operations in support of OSW. On 13 May, Captain John W. Miller assumed command as Connie's 30th skipper, and her last. She ceased OSW operations on 4 August, having conducted multiple air strikes in response to Iraqi violations of the no-fly zone. Connie departed Pearl Harbor, Hawaii on 9 September with dependents on board for the traditional Tiger Cruise on the final leg to San Diego. On 11 September Constellation was nearly halfway between Pearl Harbor and San Diego when word was received of the terrorist attacks on New York and the Pentagon. Despite discussions about turning the battle group around, the carrier was allowed to complete her regularly scheduled deployment. Connie arrived in San Diego on Friday 14 September and celebrated her 40th birthday the next month.

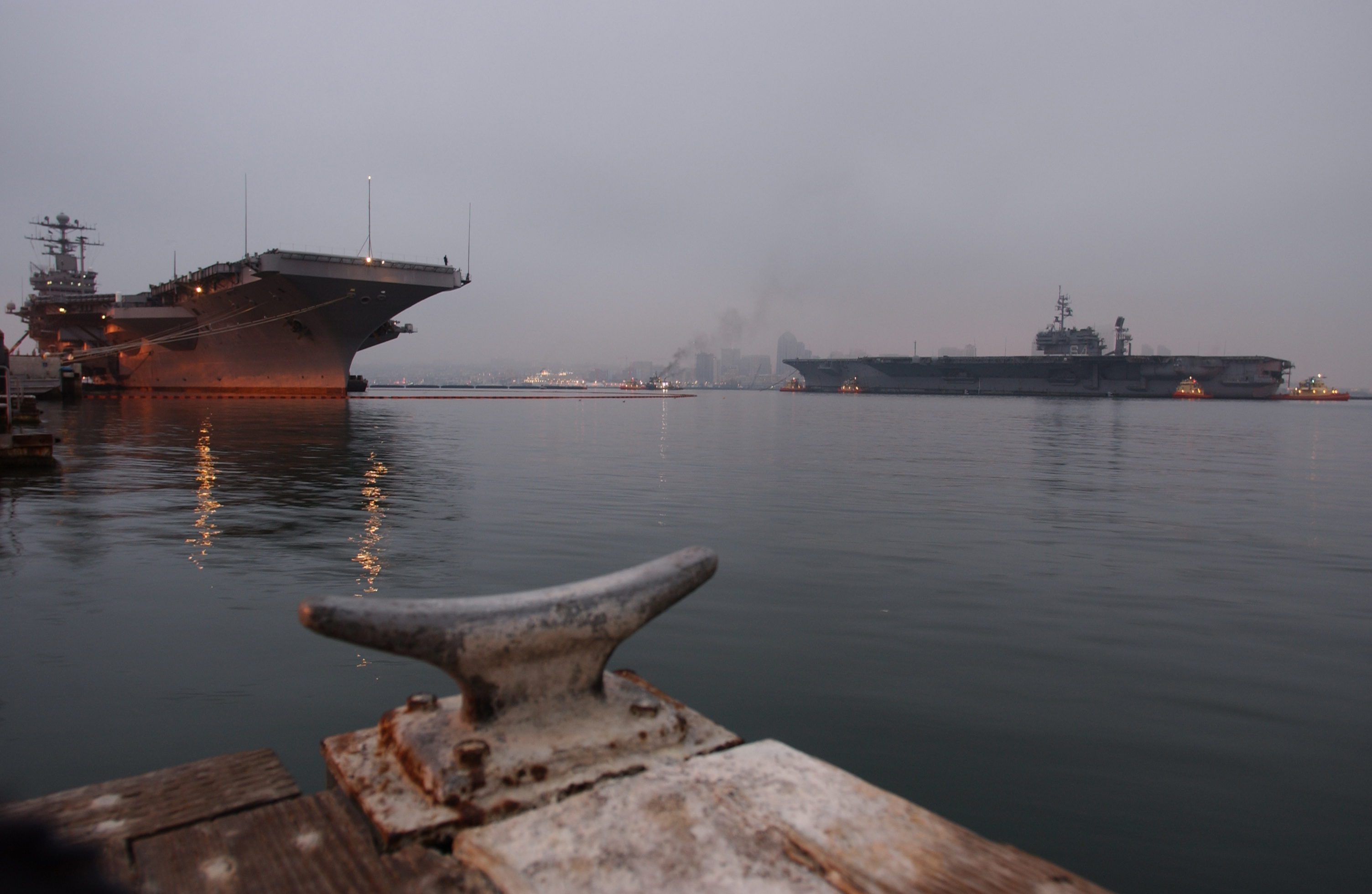
Constellation passes John C. Stennis as she departs San Diego under tow heading for the Reserve Fleet at Puget Sound in September 2003

Following an abbreviated turnaround cycle, Constellation prepared for her final deployment and the opportunity to fight in the global war on terrorism. She departed on 2 November 2002, leading Cruiser-Destroyer Group 1 under the command of Rear Admiral Barry M. Costello. She was soon supporting Operation Enduring Freedom; on 17 December she entered the Persian Gulf to begin OSW missions. On 19 March 2003, with two carriers in the eastern Mediterranean and three in the gulf, Operation Iraqi Freedom commenced. Connie was designated a night carrier and remained on station throughout the major ground combat phase. She launched more than 1,500 sorties and CVW-2 aircraft delivered over 1.7 million pounds (770,000 kg) of ordnance. While one aircraft was lost in an operational mishap, there were no fatalities.

Connie departed the gulf on 17 April and steamed for San Diego for the last time. On 1 June a Sea Control Squadron 38 (VS-38) S-3B Viking crewed by Lieutenant Hartley Postlethwaite, Lieutenant (junior grade) Arthur Gutting and Constellation Commanding Officer, Captain John W. Miller, recorded Constellation's 395,710th and final arrested landing. Her 21st and final deployment ended the next day.

Constellation was replaced by USS Ronald Reagan.

=== Decommissioning and scrapping ===
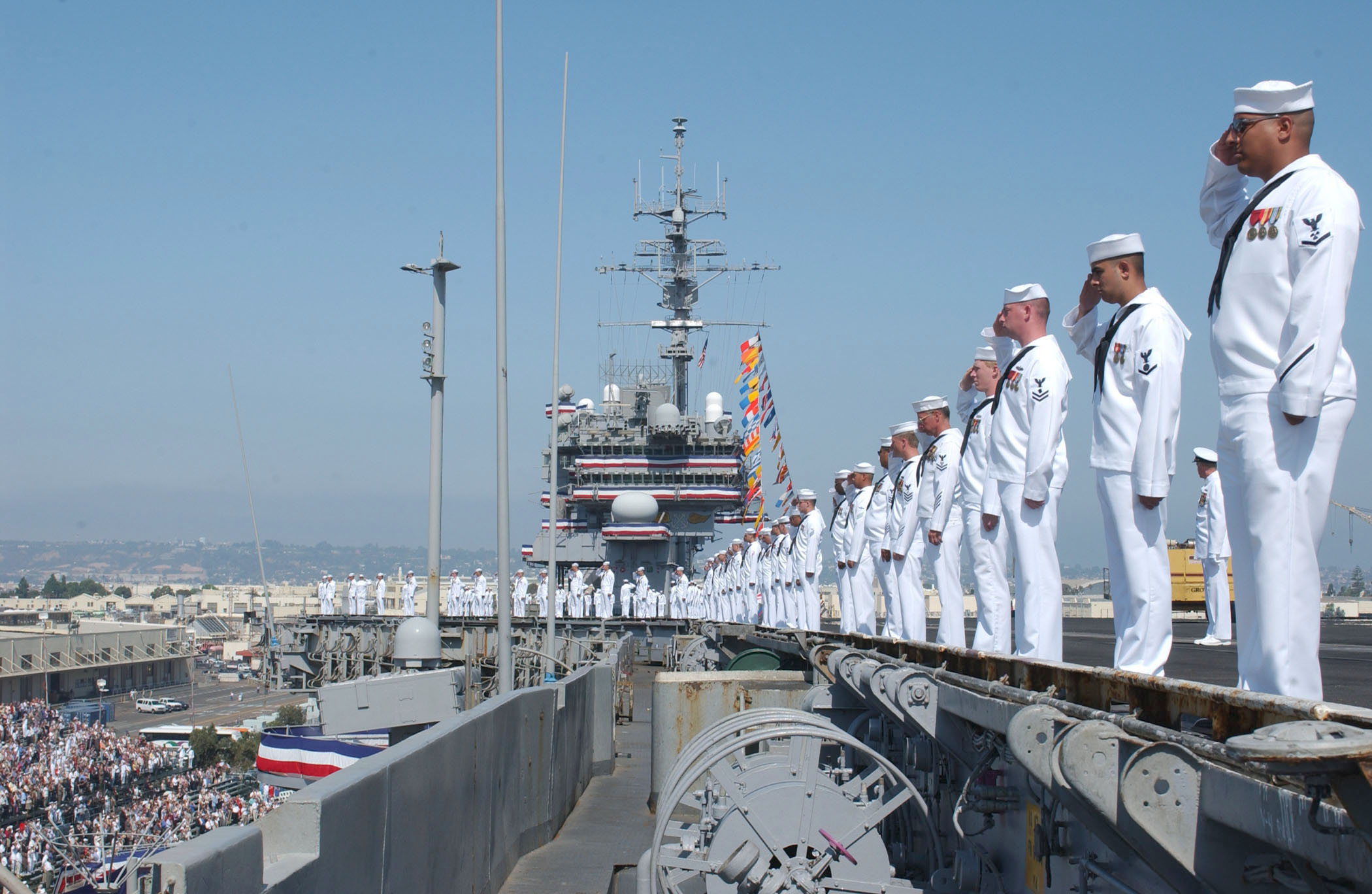
Constellation's crew on deck during the ship's decommissioning ceremony in San Diego, 7 August 2003

After 41 years of commissioned service, USS Constellation was decommissioned at the Naval Air Station North Island in San Diego on 7 August 2003. The ship was towed, beginning 12 September 2003, to the ghost fleet at the Naval Inactive Ship Maintenance Facility, Bremerton, Washington. On 2 December 2003, the ship was stricken (formally removed from the Naval Vessel Register) when Admiral Vern Clark decided against expenditure of maintenance costs. Constellation was placed in Reserve Category X, meaning she received no maintenance or preservation, and only security against fire, flooding, and pilferage was provided. Reserve Category X applies to ships that have been stricken and are awaiting disposal by scrap, sale to foreign countries, as a designated target in a live fire exercise, memorial, or donation, as applicable.

According to news reports in February 2008, Constellation was scheduled to be disposed of by dismantling in the next five years, along with USS Independence.

As of 26 January 2012, the Navy's Naval Sea Systems Command posted a notice of solicitation for the towing and complete dismantlement of multiple CV-59/CV-63 Class Aircraft Carriers in the United States, to include ex-Forrestal, ex-Independence, and ex-Constellation.

Ex-Constellation was scrapped at Brownsville, Texas, starting in early 2015. She was towed around Cape Horn on her final voyage. NASA's Operation IceBridge captured a photo south of Punta Arenas, Chile, of the ship being towed to the scrap yard. The carrier arrived at her final resting place in Brownsville on 16 January 2015. Scrapping was complete on 10 May 2017 when the last propeller shaft strut was pulled from the water.

== In popular culture ==
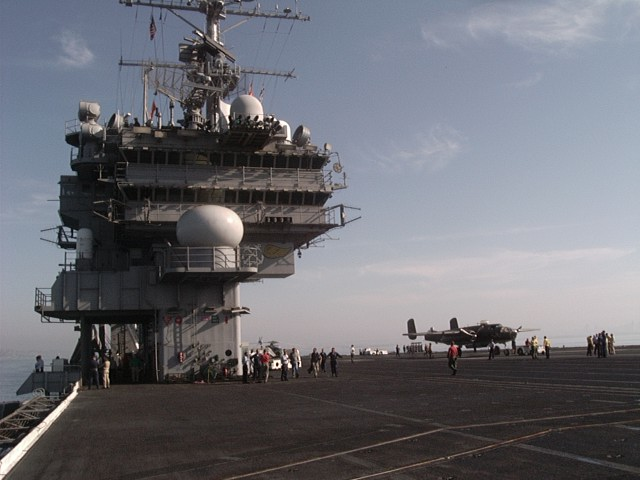
A B-25 sits on the flight deck of USS Constellation during filming of the movie Pearl Harbor in 2000.

The 2004 film Tiger Cruise is set aboard Constellation during the tiger cruise at the ending of her deployment in September 2001. The story tells of the events aboard the ship before, during, and after the September 11 attacks. Constellation actually was underway to Naval Air Station North Island with a number of "tigers" (family of crew members) on that day. The carrier had already been decommissioned when the movie was filmed; USS John C. Stennis, and USS Nimitz were used as stand-ins.

== See also ==
- List of aircraft carriers
- List of aircraft carriers of the United States Navy
- Stop Our Ship - USS Constellation - Antiwar campaign directed at the USS Constellation
