= VF-92 (1952–1975) =

Fighter Squadron 92
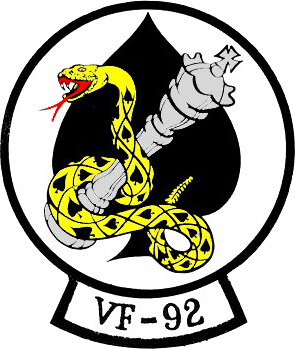
- Active: 23 March 1952 – 12 December 1975
- Country: United States
- Branch: United States Navy
- Role: Fighter aircraft
- Part of: Inactive
- Nickname(s): Silver Kings

Aircraft flown
- Fighter: F4U-4 Corsair; F9F-2 Panther; F2H-3 Banshee; F3H-2 Demon; F-4B/J Phantom II

Fighter Squadron 92, or VF-92 Silver Kings was an aviation unit of the United States Navy. Originally established as VF-92 on 26 March 1952, it was redesignated VF-54 on 1 June 1962, redesignated VF-92 on 15 October 1963, it was disestablished on 12 December 1975. It was the third US Navy squadron to be designated VF-92.

== History ==
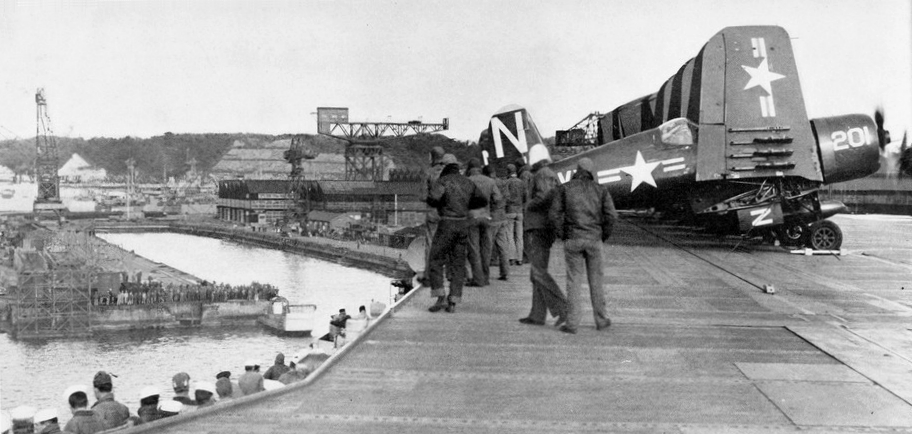
F4U-4s of VF-92 on the USS Valley Forge in 1953

VF-92 was established on 26 March 1952 at Naval Air Station Alameda flying the F4U-4 Corsair. The squadron first deployed on the USS Valley Forge, deploying to Hawaii and Yokosuka Japan. It operated off the coast of Korea from 3 January until 25 June 1953 conducting ground attack operations. In July 1953 the squadron returned to Alameda to transition to the F9F-2 Panther. In January 1954 the squadron was embarked on the USS Philippine Sea on a WestPac cruise. The Korean Cease Fire occurred while the carrier was transiting from Pearl Harbor and Yokosuka, Japan. It was decided to determine the effect of hot weather on jet operations and the carrier on which the squadron was embarked was directed to Manila Bay and conduct operations in the South China Sea. The tour was extended 3 months when the USS Boxer lost a propeller shaft on sea trials coming out of repairs. Ens. James Christensen was lost off the coast of Japan training flight because of a flame out in level flight.

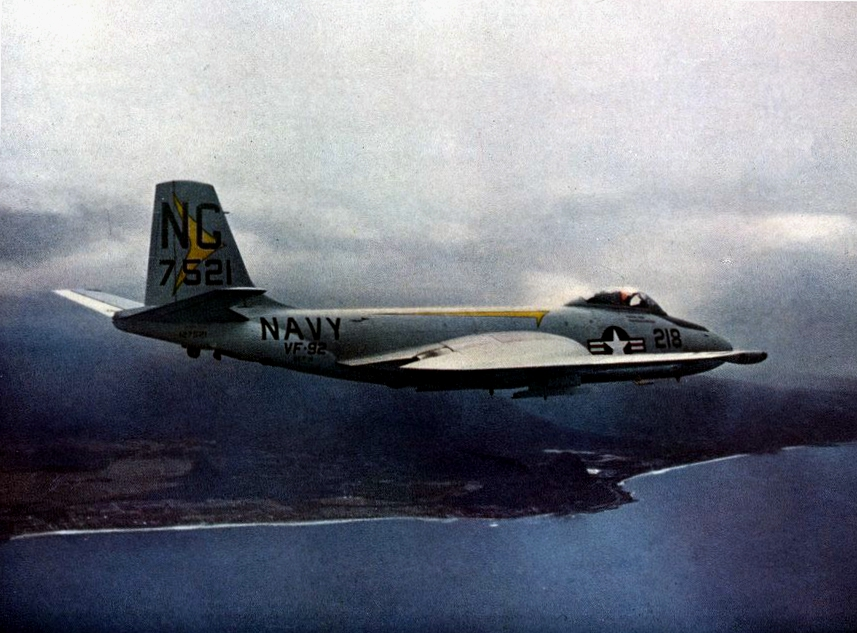
An F2H-3 of VF-92 in flight in 1959

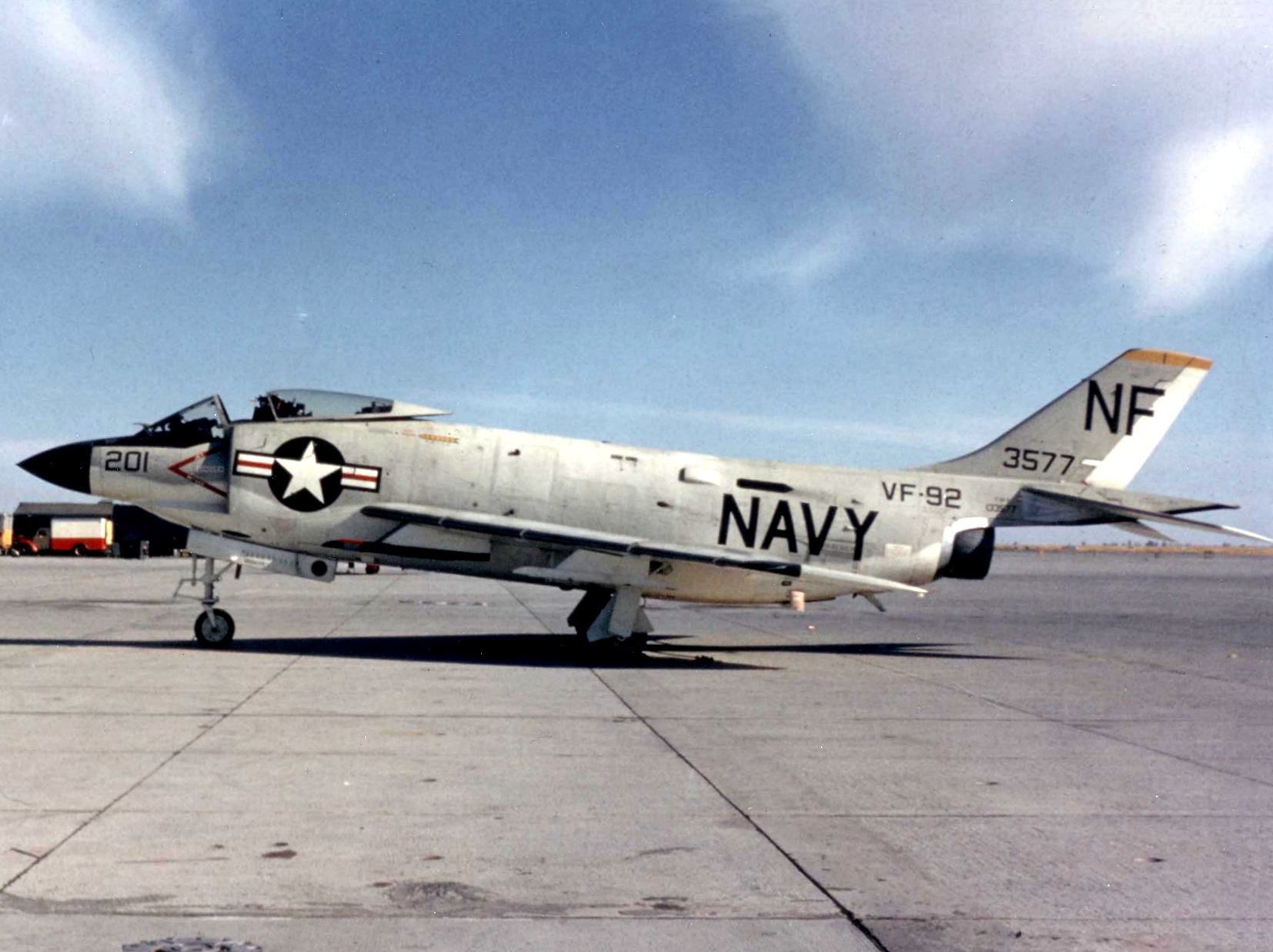
An F-3B of VF-92 in 1963

In mid-1959 the squadron transitioned to the F3H Demon. In February 1960 the squadron deployed on the USS Ranger as part of Carrier Air Wing Nine and departed for a WestPac cruise. In 1963 the squadron transitioned to the F-4B Phantom II and deployed on the USS Ranger from 5 August 1964 to 6 May 1965.

=== Vietnam ===
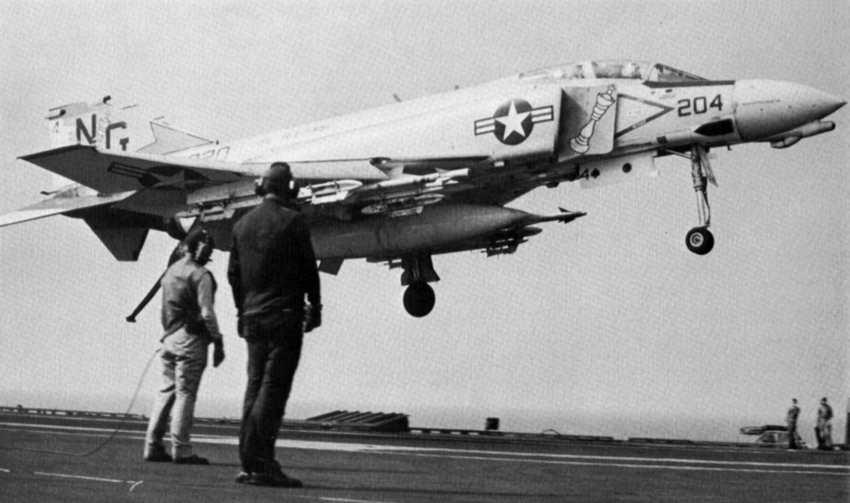
An F-4B of VF-92 landing on USS Enterprise in 1968

The squadron deployed from Miramar Naval Air Station in San Diego on the USS Enterprise from 26 October 1965 to 21 June 1966. On 29 December 1965, F-4B #151412 was hit by enemy fire during Operation Barrel Roll and crashed in Mu Gia Pass. The Pilot, CDR Edgar A. Rawsthorne (Commander, VF-92), and his radar intercept officer, LT Arthur S. Hill, were both killed; their bodies were not recovered. On 18 February 1966, F-4B, #152297 was hit by enemy fire and crashed in Thanh Hóa Province, the pilot LTJG James Ruffin was killed while the radar intercept officer LTJG Larry H. Spencer was taken prisoner. On 20 March 1966 F-4B #151410 was hit by enemy fire while conducting an armed reconnaissance mission, the plane flew out to sea and both crewmen ejected successfully, the pilot Lieutenant James S. Greenwood was rescued while the radar intercept officer Lieutenant (jg) Richard R. Ratzlaff was captured.

The squadron deployed on the USS Enterprise again from 19 November 1966 to 6 July 1967. On 4 April 1967 F-4B 3152984 collided with another jet and crashed, killing the pilot Lieutenant Edward Szeyller and the radar intercept officer Ensign David Martin

The squadron deployed on the USS Enterprise again from 3 January 1968 to 18 July 1968. On 7 May 1968 F-4B #151485 was hit by an SA-2. Both crewmen ejected successfully over water and were rescued. On 2 June 1968 F-4B #150453 suffered mechanical failure while on a barrier combat air patrol. Both crewmen ejected successfully and were rescued. On 7 June 1968 F-4B #150994 suffered mechanical failure on launch. Both crewmen ejected successfully and were rescued.

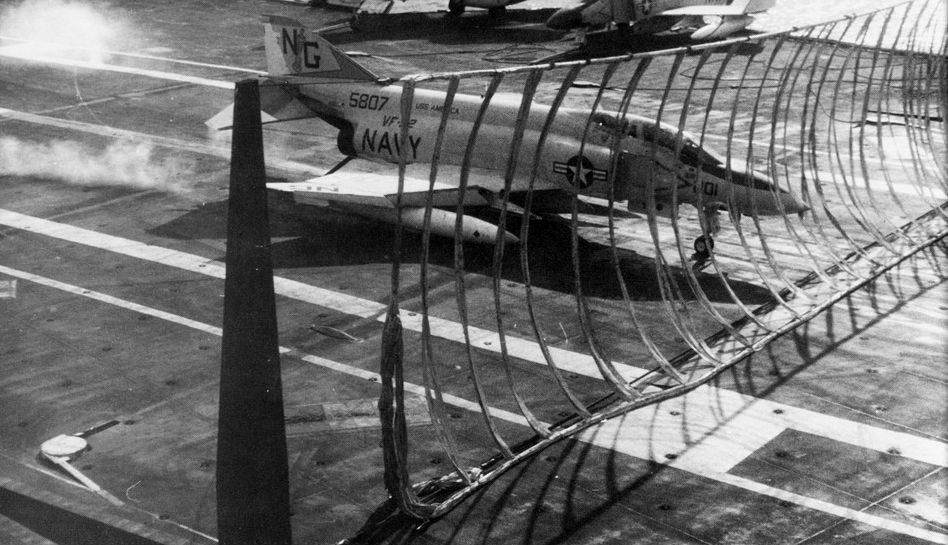
An F-4J of VF-92 hitting barrier on USS America in 1970

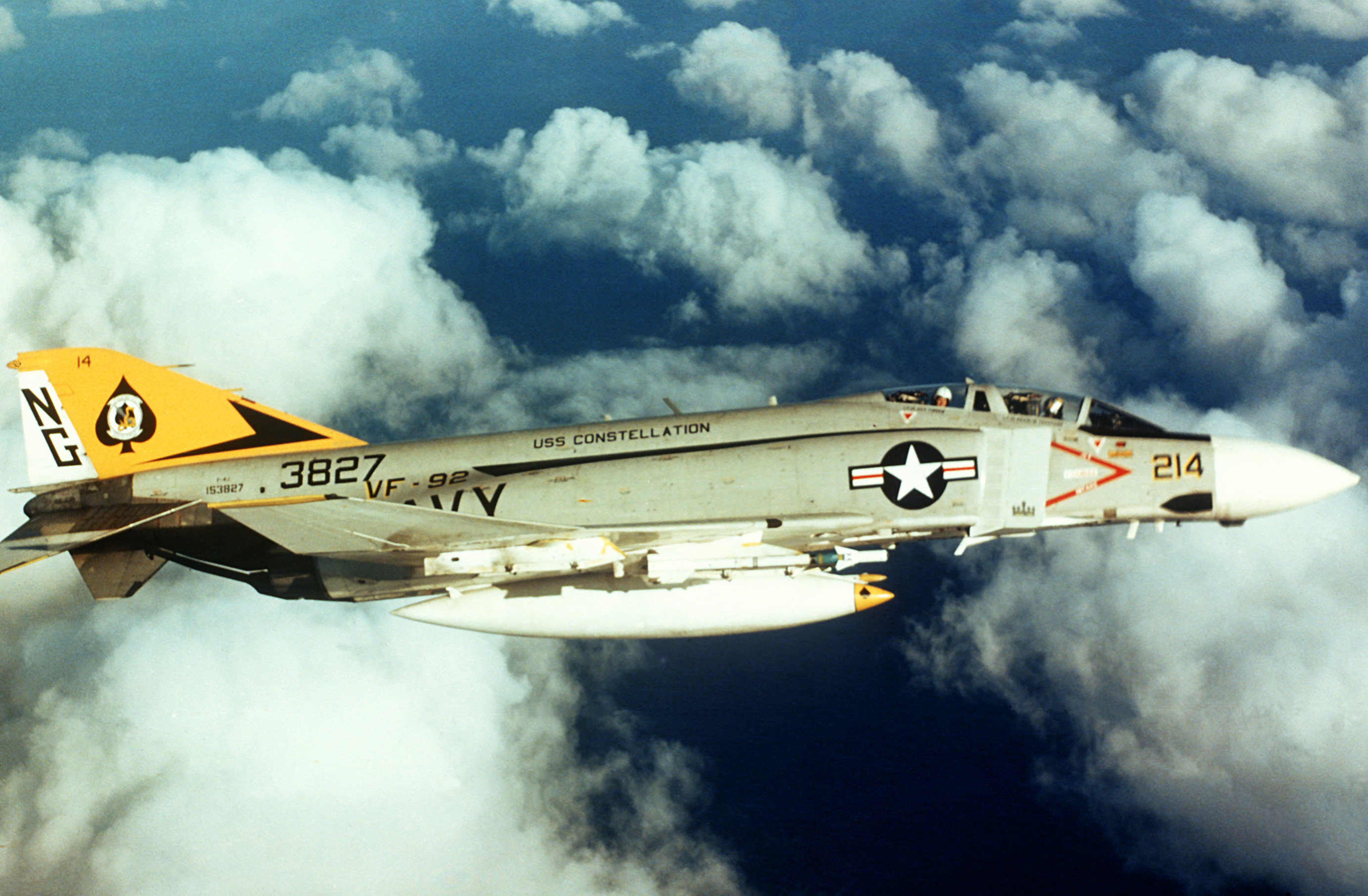
An F-4J of VF-92 in flight in 1971-2

The squadron transitioned to the F-4J and deployed again on the USS Enterprise from 6 January 1969 to 2 July 1969 On 14 January two of the squadron's F-4Js were destroyed in the USS Enterprise fire.

The squadron deployed on the USS America from 10 April 1970 to 21 December 1970. On 25 July 1970 F-4J #155789 suffered control problems over the Gulf of Tonkin. The radar intercept officer Lieutenant j.g. W Harding ejected successfully and was rescued but the pilot Lieutenant Paul Gregory was killed.

The squadron deployed on the USS Constellation from 1 October 1971 to 30 June 1972 On 10 May 1972, F-4J #157269 flown by Lieutenant Curt Dose and Lieutenant Commander James McDevitt shot down a Vietnam People's Air Force Mikoyan-Gurevich MiG-21 with an AIM-9 Sidewinder. The squadron again deployed on the USS Constellation from 5 January 1973 to 11 October 1973 and from 21 June 1974 to 22 December 1974.

The squadron was disestablished on 12 December 1975.

== See also ==
- History of the United States Navy
- List of inactive United States Navy aircraft squadrons
- List of United States Navy aircraft squadrons
