= Thomas Walker (naval officer) =

United States Navy admiral (1916–2003)

Thomas Jackson Walker III
- Born: August 6, 1916; Edgartown, Massachusetts
- Died: May 8, 2003 (aged 86)
- Military career
- Allegiance: United States
- Branch: United States Navy
- Service years: 1939–1973
- Rank: Vice admiral
- Commands: Fighter Squadron 17; Fighter Squadron 5-B; Fighter Squadron 61; Air Development Squadron 5 Fleet All-Weather Training Unit; Nitro (AE-23); Constellation (CV-64); Naval Air Forces Pacific Fleet
- Conflicts: World War II
- Awards: Navy Commendation Medal (2)

Thomas Jackson Walker III (August 6, 1916 – May 8, 2003) was a vice admiral in the United States Navy, who served as first commanding officer of the aircraft carrier USS Constellation.

== Early life and education ==
Thomas Jackson Walker III was born in Edgartown, Massachusetts (on the island of Martha's Vineyard), on August 6, 1916, into a family with long maritime connections—three of his great-grandfathers had been whaling ship captains. After attending schools in Massachusetts and Florida, he attended the Marion Military Institute in Alabama. He then entered the United States Naval Academy, Annapolis, Maryland, with the class of 1939, and while there was stroke of the Academy crew and vice-president of his class for four years.

== World War II ==
Following his commission as an ensign in June 1939, he joined the cruiser Minneapolis. In August 1941, he was detached for flight training at the Naval Air Station Pensacola, Florida. Designated Naval Aviator in March 1942, he joined the battleship New York as Senior Aviator. In this position, Walker spotted shore bombardment during the North African invasion at Safi, French Morocco and Casablanca and later participated in anti-submarine flights over convoys. He was awarded the Navy Commendation Medal "for his performance of duty on November 8, 1942, during the bombardment of Safi, French Morocco. Despite heavy enemy anti-aircraft fire he kept his ship supplied with accurate and timely reports without which the effect of the bombardment may not have been so effectively executed...."

Returning to the United States in 1943, he attended the Post Graduate School at Annapolis, where he completed the course in Aviation Ordnance in December 1944. He next reported to the Fire Control Desk in the Bureau of Aeronautics and remained there until July 1945. He was then assigned as Prospective Bomb Commander for the third atomic bomb at Los Alamos Scientific Laboratory. That bomb was planned to be detonated over Tokyo but was never dropped due to the cessation of hostilities in August 1945.

== Post-war career ==
Immediately after World War II, Walker served as Commanding Officer of Fighter Squadrons 17, 5-B and 61, during which time he was embarked with his respective squadrons aboard the newly commissioned carriers Valley Forge and Coral Sea. After service as Commanding Officer of the Naval Air Special Weapons Facility at the Sandia base, Albuquerque, New Mexico. In July 1951, he assumed command of Air Development Squadron 5. A group engaged in developing tactics for the delivery of special weapons from light aircraft at the Naval Ordnance Test Station at China Lake, California. In 1955 he became a student at the Industrial College of the Armed Forces in Washington, D.C.

Walker then began his association with the Polaris missile program as head of the Test Branch of the Fleet Ballistic Missile Program. He was temporarily assigned as Assistant to the Chief of Naval Operations, working on a classified project until June 1957. He then spent a year as Commanding Officer of the Fleet All-Weather Training Unit where he was concerned with training of carrier pilots for all weather flying and in the air defense of southern California.

In July 1958 Walker was back in Washington working with the Polaris as head of Ship Operations and Test Branch and Systems Development Analysis Chief. For his work with Polaris Captain Walker received the Navy Commendation Medal with Citation, which reads in part, "Captain Walker carried out his responsibilities with outstanding leadership and resourcefulness. Through his untiring efforts and high level of technical skill, he made a major contribution to the success of the Fleet Ballistic Missile System...."

In April 1960 Walker assumed his first ship command, the ammunition ship USS Nitro (AE-23). Six months later he was ordered detached from Nitro as Prospective Commanding Officer of Constellation, which was under construction at the New York Naval Shipyard, Brooklyn, New York. Walker assumed command of Constellation on October 27, 1961.

On November 9, 1963, Walker was promoted to Rear Admiral (lower half) and was relieved of command of Constellation by Captain Stanley W. "Swede" Vejesta.

From 1969 to 1971 Walker commanded the Naval Air Systems Command. Walker retired from the Navy as a Vice Admiral, after serving as Commander of Naval Air of the Pacific Fleet (COMNAVAIRPAC).

Admiral Walker died on May 8, 2003 at the age of 86 from pneumonia.
