= Naval Weapons Evaluation Facility =

Weapons testing for US Navy

The Naval Weapons Evaluation Facility (NWEF) operated through the Cold War investigating aircraft-weapon interfaces to provide United States Navy aircraft with nuclear weapons delivery capability.

== History ==
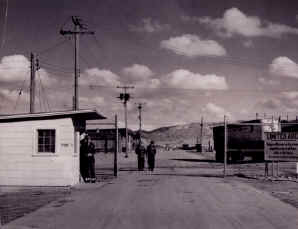
Security gate at Sandia Base during the earliest days of Navy activity.

The United States Army Air Corps began using Kirtland Field south of Albuquerque, New Mexico, in the early years of World War II. The adjacent Sandia Base was created as a training facility. Several units from the Los Alamos Scientific Laboratory were relocated to the Sandia Base in 1945 to use the Kirtland Field flight test facilities. Kirtland Field was designated Kirtland Air Force Base in 1947, and the Armed Forces Special Weapons Project (AFSWP) operated on Sandia Base. When the United States Air Force established the Air Force Special Weapons Command at Kirtland Air Force Base in 1949, the United States Navy formed a detachment to investigate nuclear capabilities for naval aircraft and assist the AFSWP with naval equipment for demonstrations and training. This detachment was headed by CDR Thomas Walker who had been working at the Los Alamos Scientific Laboratory as the prospective commander of the 4th atomic bomb mission which was cancelled following the surrender of Japan. In 1952 this detachment was designated the Naval Air Special Weapons Facility (NASWF) to conduct special weapons tests on the White Sands Missile Range and Tonopah Test Range in coordination with the United States Atomic Energy Commission. As other nuclear weapons delivery systems were developed through the late 1950s, the mission expanded to include ballistic missiles, guided missiles, and torpedoes. In March 1961 NASWF was redesignated the Naval Weapons Evaluation Facility with mission expanded to include safety studies on nuclear weapons. Aircraft used for NWEF testing were decorated with a unique thunderbird image. NWEF personnel became known as the Rio Grande Navy among the Albuquerque community. Popularity of the Albuquerque International Balloon Fiesta encouraged NWEF personnel to form the Navy Balloon Team as a recruiting effort in 1976. Operations at Sandia Base ceased in 1993 after Base Realignment and Closure transferred the functions of NWEF to the weapons division of the Naval Air Warfare Center.

== NWEF testing ==
Early work involved adapting the Douglas A-1 Skyraider, A-3 Skywarrior, and A-4 Skyhawk for Mark 4, 5, 6, 7, 8, 12, 15, 18, 27, and 39 bombs. As missiles replaced those earlier weapons the B28, B43, B57, and B61 nuclear bombs were tested with the Grumman A-6 Intruder, LTV A-7 Corsair II, McDonnell Douglas F-4 Phantom II, McDonnell Douglas F/A-18, and the A-4 Skyhawk.

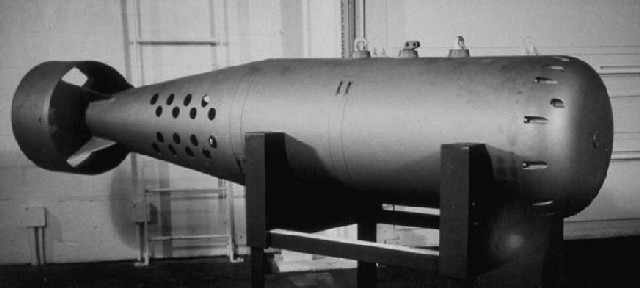
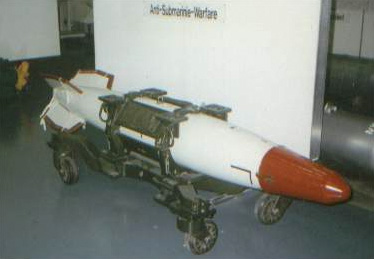
Lulu (left) and B57 (right) nuclear depth bombs

Mk 90 Betty and Mk 101 Lulu nuclear depth bombs were tested with Lockheed P-2 Neptune, Lockheed P-3 Orion, and Martin P5M Marlin maritime patrol aircraft, the Sikorsky SH-3 Sea King helicopter, and the Grumman S-2 Tracker. The Mk 101 Lulu was also tested for NATO allies with the Canadair CP-107 Argus, Avro Shackleton, and Hawker Siddeley Nimrod. These aircraft and the Bréguet 1150 Atlantic were later tested with the B57 nuclear bomb, while the A-1, A-3, and A-4 were tested with the Mk 105 Hotpoint anti-submarine weapon.
