= Aylwin (disambiguation) =

Patricio Aylwin (1918–2016) was a Chilean politician.

Aylwin may also refer to:

- Andrés Aylwin (1925–2018), Chilean politician
- Guy Maxwell Aylwin (1889–1968), British architect
- Harry Aylwin (1870–1949), Australian rules footballer
- Horace Aylwin (1904–1980), Canadian sprinter
- Jean Aylwin (1885–1964), Scottish actress
- John Cushing Aylwin (1778–1813), American officer
- Nigel Aylwin-Foster, British general
- Thomas Cushing Aylwin (1806–1871), Canadian politician
- Aylwin Lewis (born 1954), American businessman

== Other uses ==
- Aylwin (film), British film
- Aylwin-class destroyer, a list of U.S Navy destroyers
- USS Aylwin, several United States Navy ships
- Aylwin Township in Quebec, part of Kazabazua today

== See also ==
- Alvin (disambiguation)
