= USS Valdez =

Knox-class frigate (1973)

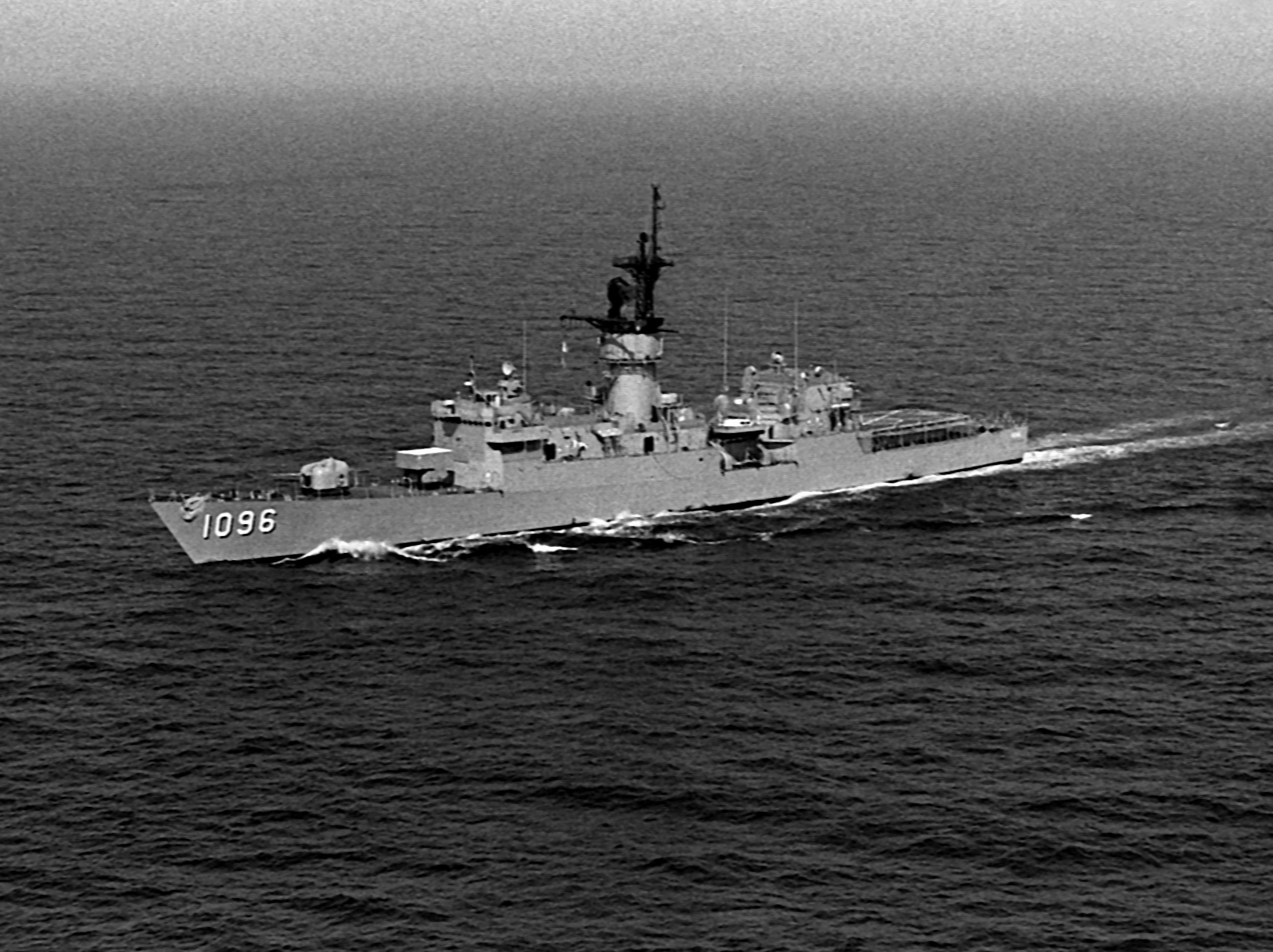
- USS Valdez (FF-1096)

History

United States
- Name: USS Valdez
- Namesake: Phil Isadore Valdez
- Ordered: 25 August 1966
- Builder: Avondale Shipyard, Westwego, Louisiana
- Laid down: 30 June 1972
- Launched: 24 March 1973
- Acquired: 12 July 1974
- Commissioned: 27 July 1974
- Decommissioned: 16 December 1991
- Stricken: 11 January 1995
- Motto: Courageous Combatant
- Fate: Transferred to Republic of China, April 1998

Republic of China
- Name: Yi Yang (宜陽)
- Namesake: Yiyang
- Acquired: 29 April 1998
- Commissioned: 18 October 1999
- Identification: F 939
- Status: in active service

General characteristics
- Class & type: Knox-class frigate
- Displacement: 3,011 tons (3,877 full load)
- Length: 438 ft (134 m)
- Beam: 46 ft 9 in (14.25 m)
- Draught: 24 ft 9 in (7.54 m)
- Installed power: 2 × CE 1200 psi boilers; 35,000 shp (26,000 kW)
- Propulsion: 1 Westinghouse geared turbine; 1 shaft
- Speed: over 27 knots (50 km/h; 31 mph)
- Complement: 18 officers, 267 enlisted
- Sensors & processing systems: AN/SPS-40 Air Search Radar; AN/SPS-67 Surface Search Radar; AN/SQS-26 Sonar; AN/SQR-18 Towed array sonar system; Mk68 Gun Fire Control System
- Electronic warfare & decoys: AN/SLQ-32 Electronics Warfare System
- Armament: 1 x Mk-16 8 cell missile launcher for ASROC and Harpoon missiles; 1 x Mk-42 5-inch/54 caliber gun; Mark 46 torpedoes from four single tube launchers)
- Aircraft carried: 1 x SH-2 Seasprite (LAMPS I) helicopter

USS Valdez (FF-1096) is the forty-fifth Knox-class frigate and was built by Avondale Shipyard, Westwego, Louisiana, and originally designated as an ocean escort (DE-1096). Commissioned in the United States Navy from 1974 to 1991, she was the first U.S. Navy ship to be named for a Spanish-descended American war hero. In 1998, Valdez was leased to Republic of China and renamed Yi Yang (FF-939).

== Namesake ==
Valdez was named in honor of Hospitalman Phil Isadore Valdez. Born on 13 April 1946 in Dixon, New Mexico. He graduated from Española High School, Española, New Mexico. On 1 November 1965 he reported to Recruit Training and then attended Naval Hospital Corps Schools San Diego, California. He was assigned to Naval Hospital Key West, Florida; and then on 19 December 1966 transferred to Bravo Co., 1st Battalion, 1st Marines, 1st Marine Division (Reinforced), Fleet Marine Force in the Republic of Vietnam, near Danang.

Hospitalman Valdez was killed in action on 29 January 1967 while serving as corpsman with the Third Platoon when that unit was flown in by helicopter to provide support for the embattled Hotel Co., 2nd Battalion, 1st Marines. Upon landing Valdez' unit came under heavy sniper fire, and several Marines were wounded. Valdez sprang into action running across open land to an injured Marine while being raked by enemy fire. After helping the first Marine to cover and treating his wounds, Valdez returned to the open and rushed to the aid of a second Marine. Positioning himself as to protect the wounded Marine Valdez was mortally wounded by enemy sniper fire. As a result of his exceptional courage he was posthumously advanced in rank to Petty Officer Third Class and awarded the Navy Cross.

== Operational history ==
=== United States Navy ===
USS Valdez was laid down on 30 June 1972 at Oswego, Louisiana, by the Avondale Shipyard; launched on 24 March 1973; sponsored by Mrs. Manuelita Valdez, the mother of Hospitalman Third Class Valdez; and commissioned on 27 July 1974 at Charleston, South Carolina. The Valdez was the first U.S. Navy ship to be named for a Spanish-descended American war hero.

Valdez spent the following three months in Charleston fitting out and completing final trials. She departed Charleston on 27 October, bound for Guantanamo Bay, Cuba, whence she operated for the next seven weeks. Upon completion of her shakedown cruise, she returned to Charleston for a month of leave and upkeep followed by inspections and preparations for post-shakedown availability. That availability began on 25 February 1975 and ended on 11 April. At that juncture, she began normal operations out of Charleston and, later, participated in Exercise "Solid Shield," an amphibious landing and convoy protection exercise conducted during the last week in May and the first week in June near Morehead City, North Carolina. On 6 June, the ocean escort returned to Charleston and resumed the normal routine until 18 August. During that period, she was reclassified a frigate and redesignated FF-1096 on 30 June 1975. On 18 August, the frigate steamed out of Charleston for her first overseas deployment. She changed operational control to the 6th Fleet upon arrival at Rota, Spain, on 29 August. From there, the frigate moved into and across the Mediterranean Sea to Egypt. She transited the Suez Canal on 5 September and the next day reported for duty with the Middle East Force at Djibouti in the French Territory of the Afars and Issas. During her tour of duty with the Middle East Force, Valdez participated in bilateral exercises with units of the naval forces of France, Iran, Abu Dhabi, and Pakistan as well as of the Air Force of Kuwait. She also embarked officers of the Saudi Arabian Navy for training and participated in the multinational CENTO exercise codenamed MidLink-75. Ports of call included Bandar Abbas, Iran; Bahrain; Kuwait; Shar-jah and Abu Dhabi in the United Arab Emirates; Karachi, Pakistan; Assab, Ethiopia; Victoria, Seychelles; and Jidda, Saudi Arabia.

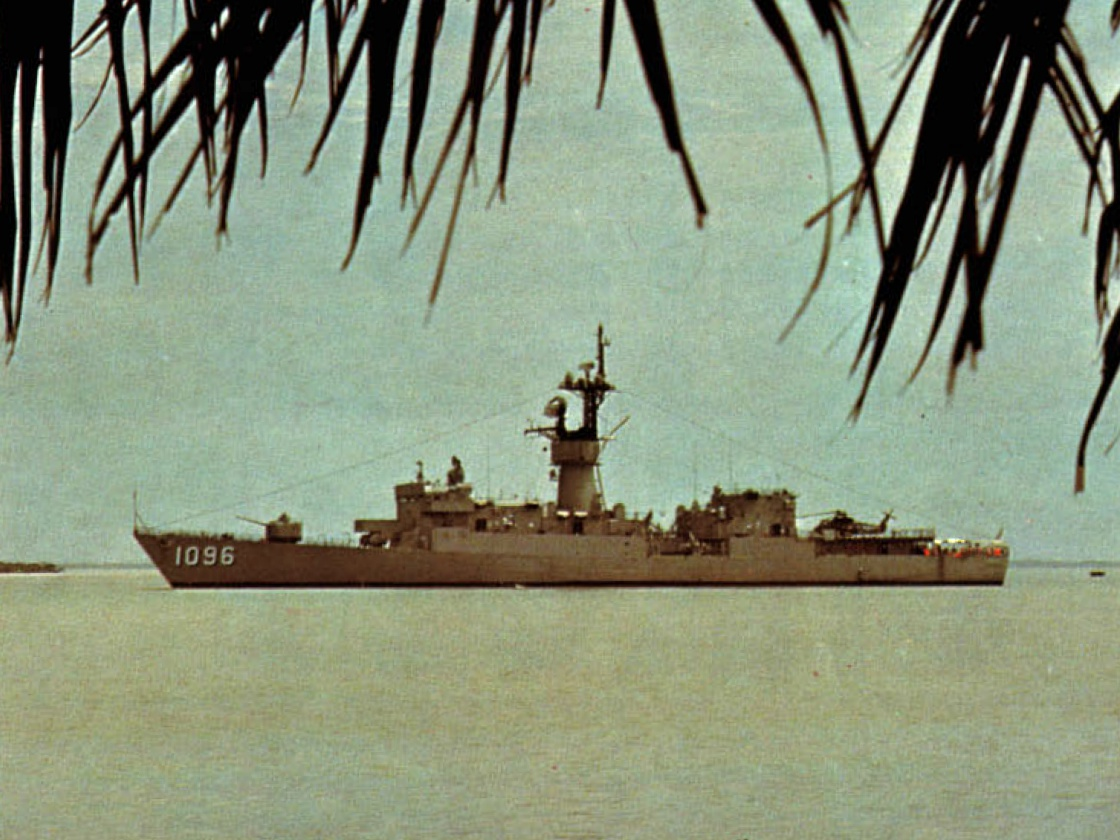
Valdez in Guinea-Bissau, 1978.

On 31 January 1976, Valdez retransited the Suez Canal on her way home. She recrossed the Mediterranean Sea and arrived back in Rota on 5 February where she remained until 8 February. Between 11 and 14 February, she visited Brest, France, where she participated in a gun salute symbolic of the first salute ever fired to the flag of the independent United States. From there, she set course—via the Azores and Bermuda— to return to Charleston. Valdez reentered her home port on 25 February.

After leave and upkeep, she resumed normal 2nd Fleet operations out of Charleston. That duty lasted until September when she began preparations for another 6th Fleet deployment. On 4 October, she stood out of Charleston and arrived in Rota 10 days later. On 16 October, Valdez reentered the Mediterranean. The ship spent the remainder of the year and the initial months of 1977 engaged in operations with the 6th Fleet. Valdez returned to Charleston on 21 April and commenced 30 days of leave and upkeep.

Following a summer devoted to operations off the east coast, the fleet frigate began preparations for another overseas period, this time a deployment to the North Atlantic. She departed Charleston on 27 September to join a NATO task group for Exercise "Combined Effort." During the next two months, Valdez engaged in other NATO exercises at sea interspersed with port visits. Her ports of call included Lisbon, Portugal; Portsmouth, England; Amsterdam, the Netherlands; Bremerhaven, Germany; and Cherbourg, France. Valdez returned to Charleston on 2 December and remained there into the new year.

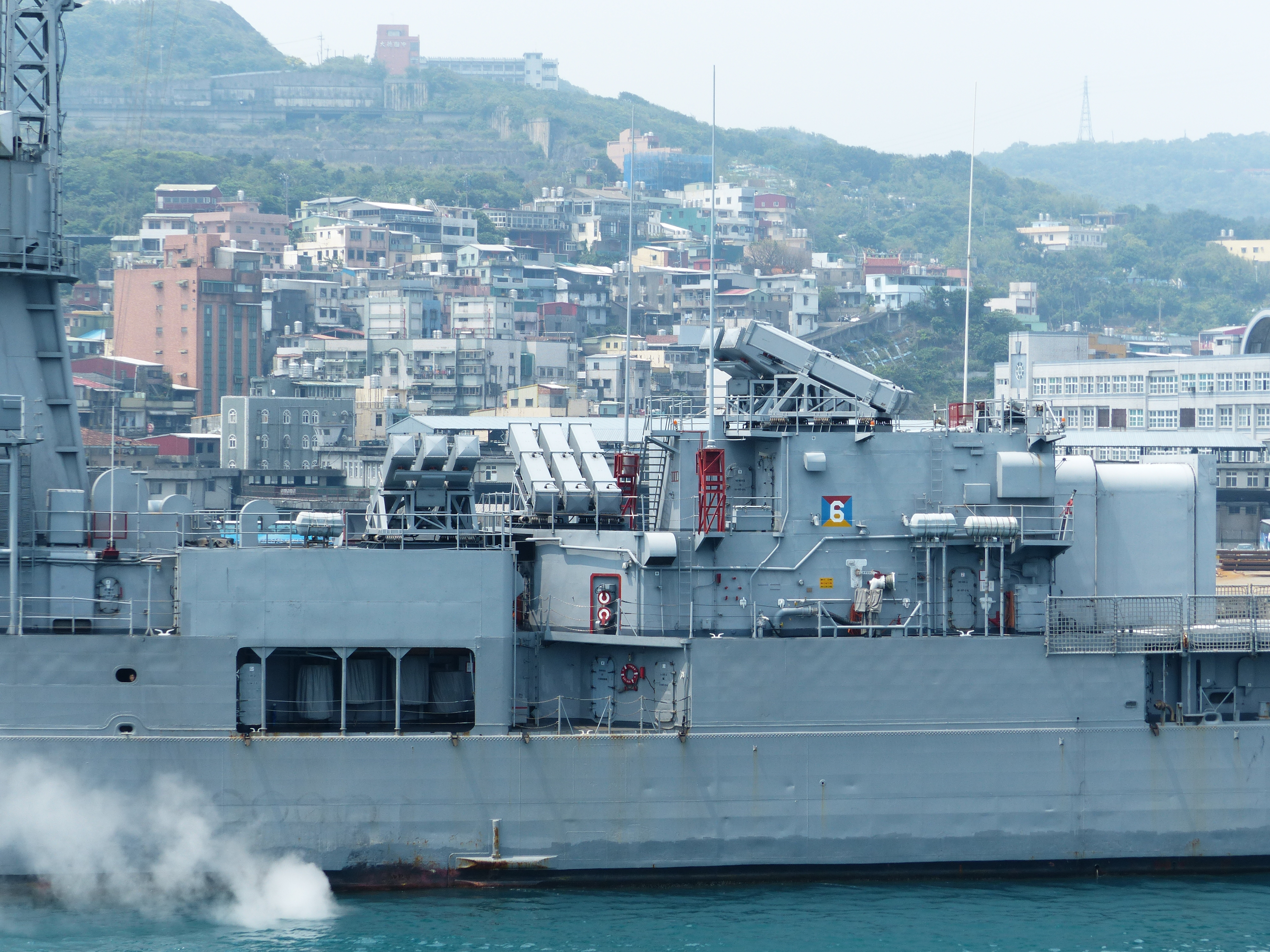
Ex-USS Valdez, ROCN Yi Yang (FFG-939) in 2014

The ship got underway on 16 January 1978 for a three-month good will cruise to West Africa and South America. Countries on her agenda consisted of Morocco, Guinea-Bissau, Liberia, Togo, Ivory Coast, Nigeria, Senegal, and Brazil. Valdez returned to Charleston on 18 April. A month of repairs and leave followed. The summer was spent conducting operations out of her home port. On 12 September, Valdez departed Charleston for Boston, Massachusetts, where she commenced a regular overhaul on 15 September at the Bethlehem Steel shipyard. The ship remained there into 1979.

Valdez was decommissioned on 16 December 1991 after seventeen years and four months in active, and struck from the Naval Vessel Register on 11 January 1995.

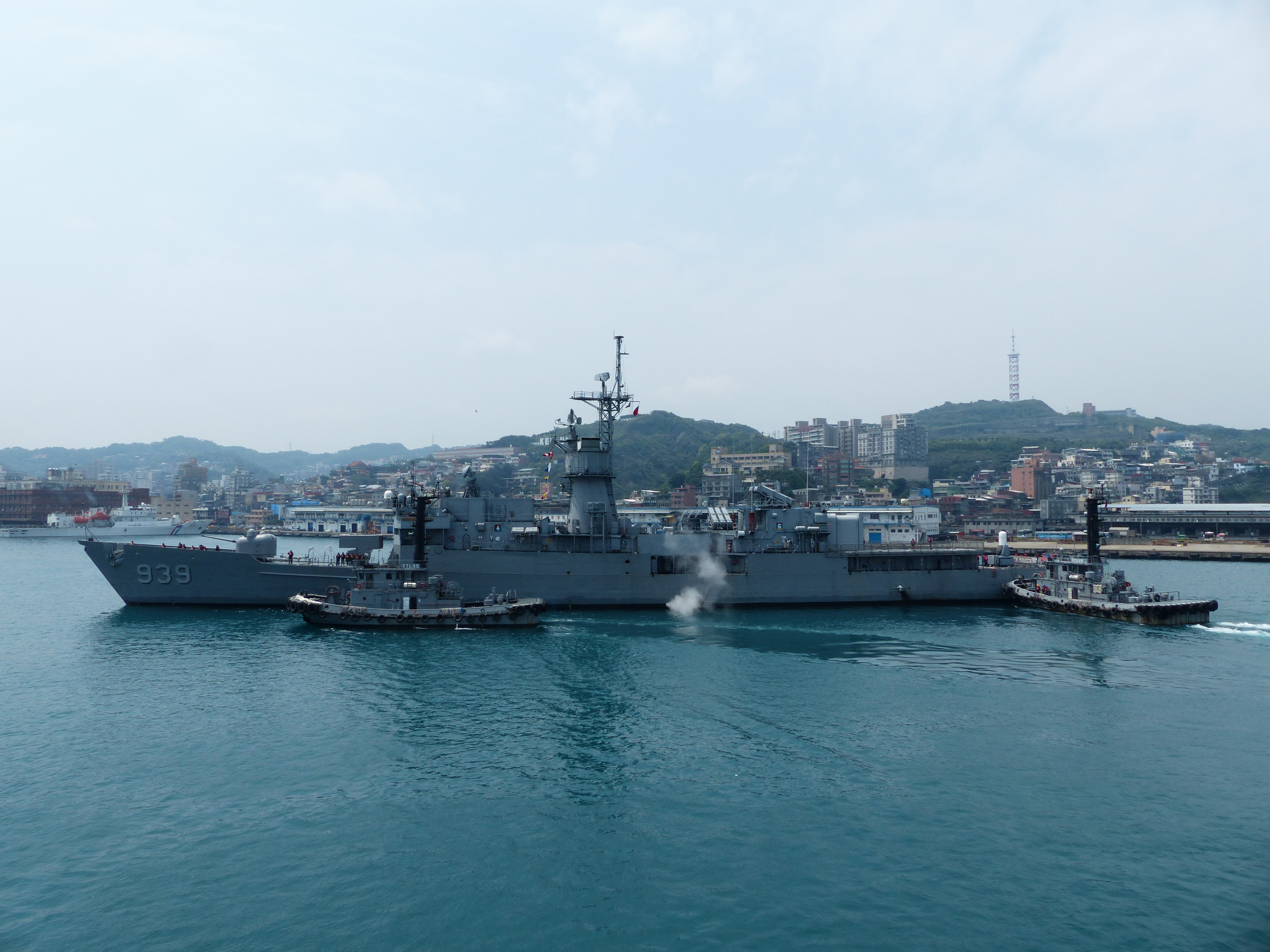
Yi Yang (FF-939) in 2014.

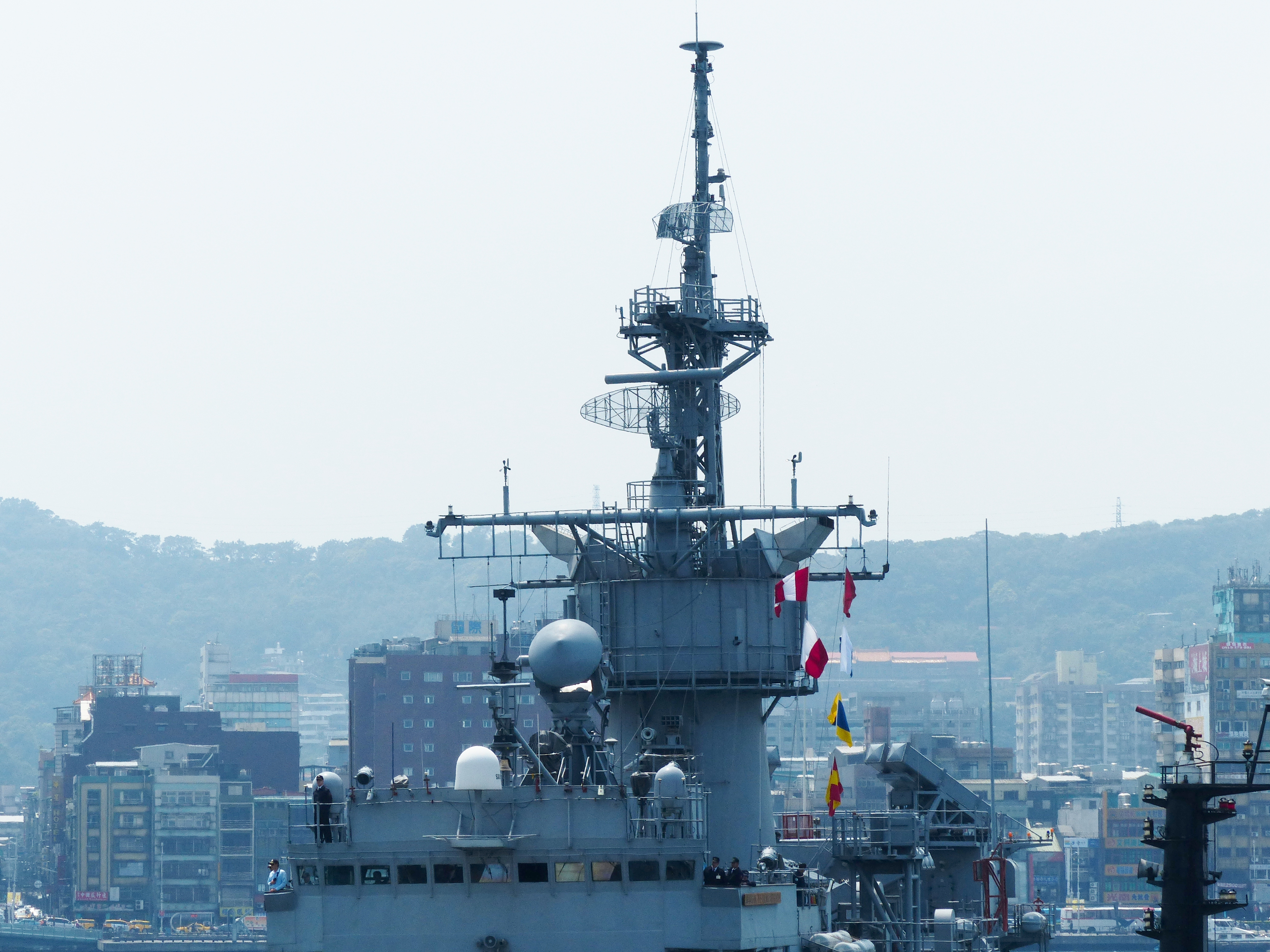
Bridge Top and Main Mast of ROCN Yi Yang (FFG-939)

=== Transfer to Republic of China ===
USS Valdez was leased to Republic of China 29 April 1998 and renamed Yi Yang (FF-939). The ship was commissioned 18 October 1999.

In mid-2006, the Yi Yang warship completed the "Wu San Hua" project modification.

On April 8, 2023, the East Sea Fleet of PLA continued the "Joint Sword" exercise near Taiwan, and the frigate Xuzhou approached to about 5 nautical miles from the main ship.

== See also ==
- USS Aylwin (FF-1081)
- USS Barbey
- USS Joseph Hewes (FF-1078)
- USS Kirk
- USS Brewton
