= Alvin =

Alvin may refer to:

== Places ==
=== Canada ===
- Alvin, British Columbia

=== United States ===
- Alvin, Colorado
- Alvin, Georgia
- Alvin, Illinois
- Alvin, Michigan
- Alvin, Texas
- Alvin, Wisconsin, a town
- Alvin (community), Wisconsin, an unincorporated community

== Other uses ==
- Alvin (given name)
- Alvin (surname)
- Alvin (crater), a crater on Mars
- Alvin (digital cultural heritage platform), a Swedish platform for digitised cultural heritage
- Alvin (horse), a Canadian Standardbred racehorse
- 13677 Alvin, an asteroid
- DSV Alvin, a deep-submergence vehicle
- Alvin, a fictional planet on ALF (TV series)
- Alvin Seville, of the fictional animated characters Alvin and the Chipmunks
- "Alvin", by James from the album Girl at the End of the World
- Tropical Storm Alvin

== See also ==
- Alvin Community College
- Alvin High School
- Aylwin (disambiguation)
