= Elof Tegnér =

Swedish historian, author and librarian (1844–1900)

Elof Tegnér LVA LHA
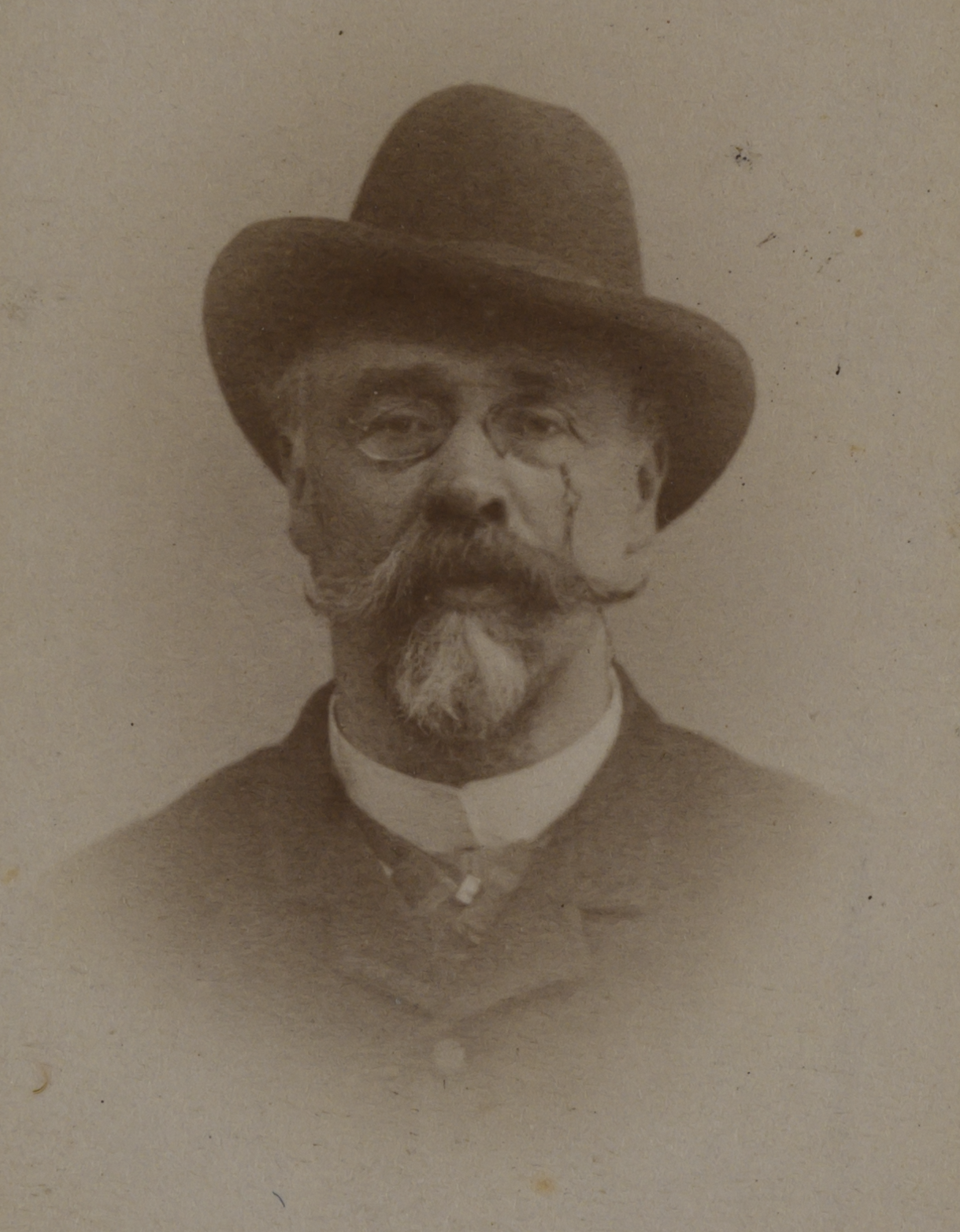
- Photograph from Alvin by unknown.
- Born: 30 June 1844; Källstorp Parish, Scania, Kingdom of Sweden
- Died: 26 February 1900 (aged 55); Lund City Parish, Scania, Kingdom of Sweden
- Education: Lund University
- Spouse: Hedvig Munck (m. 1891)

Elof Kristofer Tegnér (30 June 1844 – 26 February 1900) was a Swedish historian, author and librarian of the Lund University Library. He was the grandson of Esaias Tegnér the Elder and brother of Esaias Tegnér the Younger.

== Biography ==
He is the son of Christofer Tegnér and Emma Sophia Kinberg. In 1860, he graduated from Lund University. In 1865 and 1870, he worked as extraordinary assistant at the Lund University Library and the Swedish Royal Library respectively. Tegnér was responsible for moving the collections of the Royal Library, when it moved to Humlegården, Stockholm in 1877, as he was considered the most qualified; including tours he made to Germany, Italy, Spain and France in 1868–1869 to study libraries and museums. In 1883, he was appointed head librarian of the Lund University Library. In 1899, he was elected 689th member of the Royal Swedish Academy of Sciences.

On 9 September 1891, he married Hedvig Munck af Rosenschöld, daughter of Thomas Munck af Rosenschöld. He was buried in the Lund Northern Cemetery.
