= Allvin =

Allvin is the surname of the following notable people:

- David W. Allvin (born c. 1963), United States Air Force four-star general
- Patrik Allvin (born 1974), Swedish ice hockey player and executive

== See also ==
- Alvin (surname)
