= USS Aylwin =

Four ships in the United States Navy have been named USS Aylwin for John Cushing Aylwin.

- USS Aylwin (1813), was launched in 1813, fought in the Battle of Lake Champlain and sold in 1815.
- USS Aylwin (DD-47), was the lead ship of her class of destroyers, commissioned in 1914, served in World War I and decommissioned in 1922.
- USS Aylwin (DD-355), was a Farragut-class destroyer, commissioned in 1935, served in World War II and decommissioned in 1945.
- USS Aylwin (FF-1081), was a Knox-class frigate, commissioned in 1971 and decommissioned in 1992.
