= Paul Jacobs (U.S. Navy officer) =

Officer of the United States Navy

Captain Paul Jacobs
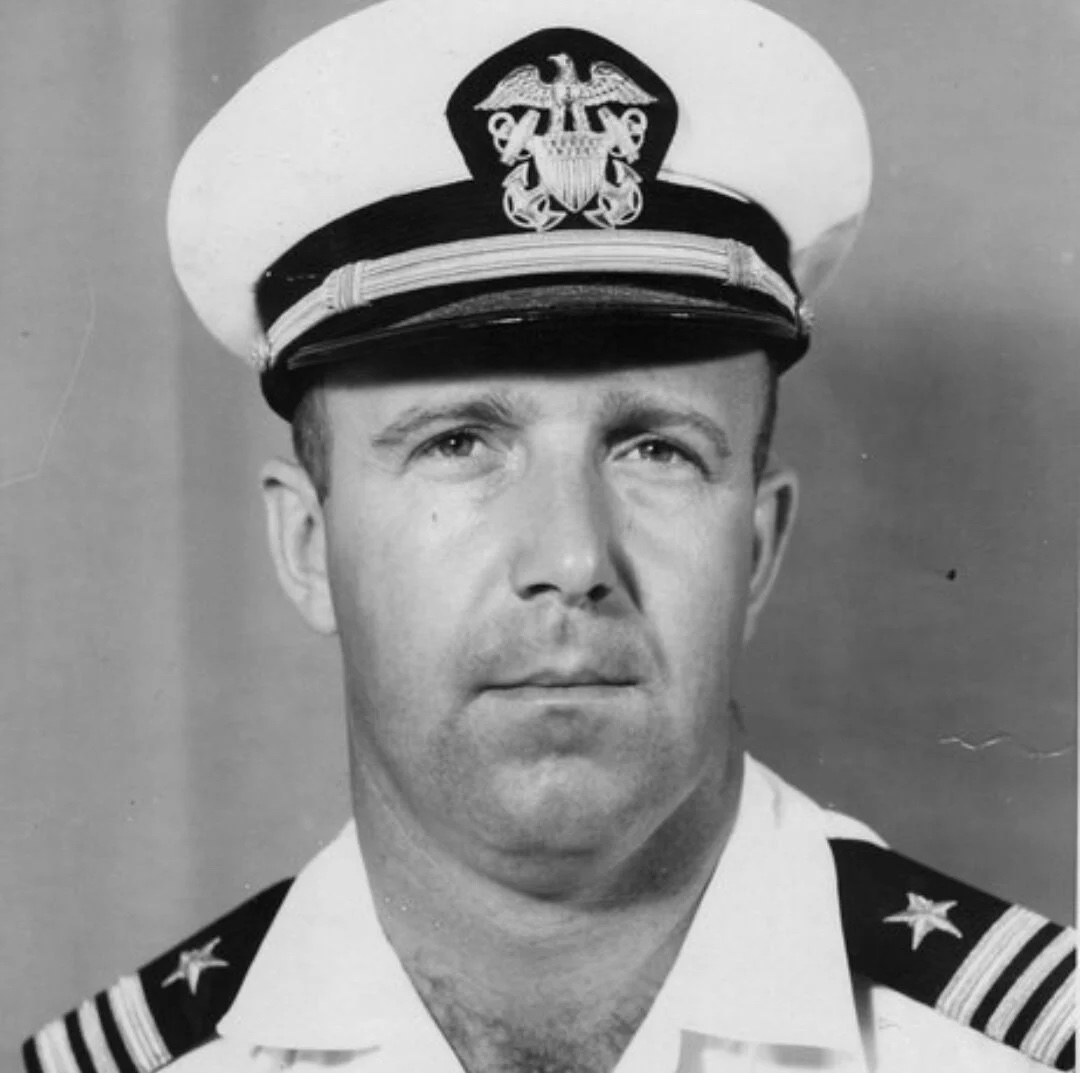
- LCDR Jacobs c.1969
- Born: Paul Hamilton Jacobs; October 7, 1936; Malden, Massachusetts, US
- Died: December 8, 2020 (aged 84); Somerset, California, US
- Burial place: Ashes scattered off San Diego Bay
- Alma mater: Maine Maritime Academy
- Military career
- Allegiance: United States
- Branch: United States Navy
- Service years: 1958-1984
- Rank: Captain
- Nickname: Jake
- Unit: U.S. Seventh Fleet
- Commands: USS Meadowlark; USS Esteem; USS Kirk
- Conflicts: Second Taiwan Strait Crisis; Vietnam War * Operation Market Time * Operation Pocket Money * Operation Frequent Wind
- Awards: Bronze Star Medal; Meritorious Service Medal; Navy Commendation Medal; Gallantry Cross with Palm

Captain Paul Hamilton "Jake" Jacobs (October 7, 1936 – December 8, 2020) was an officer in the United States Navy who served five combat tours in Vietnam, including as commander of USS Kirk (DE-1087) during Operation Frequent Wind. He is credited with saving the lives of 30,000+ South Vietnamese citizens following the Fall of Saigon.

== Early life ==
Jacobs was born in Malden, Massachusetts, the son of marine engineer George Jacobs and Carolyn Stanley, a nurse. His family could trace their lineage back to pre-revolutionary colonial Massachusetts. He later moved in with his grandparents in Steuben, Maine, then to Castine when his father joined the faculty at Maine Maritime Academy. Jacobs graduated from Milbridge High School in 1955. He then attended Maine Maritime, graduating in 1958. He frequently credited both his father and professor Joe Pittison as examples of the style of leadership he would later apply in life.

A draft notice prompted Jacobs to join the United States Navy Reserve, where he knew he could gain a commission as an ensign rather than serve as a private in the Army. One month later, he found himself in Kinmen aboard USS Onslow as an engineering officer in the middle of the Second Taiwan Strait Crisis.

== Military career ==
Jacobs was quickly promoted to LTJG, he was made chief engineer aboard the destroyer USS Harry E. Hubbard. Learning he could never command his own ship as a restricted reserve officer, his captain changed the course of his career by convincing him that if he wanted to make a career out of the Navy, he should fully commit and join the regular Navy to become an unrestricted line officer. After a shore tour to attend surface warfare school, Jacobs was entrusted with command of the coastal minesweeper USS Meadowlark at 25 while still a junior officer.

Jacobs's next command, the oceangoing minesweeper USS Esteem, would take him to Vietnam, patrolling the Gulf of Tonkin during Operation Market Time. After another shore rotation at the Naval War College for advanced leadership training, he was sent back out to the fleet as Executive Officer aboard the destroyer USS Floyd B. Parks, then as plans officer of Task Force 75, and temporarily stepping in as chief of staff overseeing Operation Custom Tailor following Admiral Rembrandt C. Robinson's death with his key staff in a helicopter crash during the larger Operation Pocket Money two days prior.

=== Operation Frequent Wind ===
The defining moment in Jacobs's career would be his actions during Operation Frequent Wind. While on another shore rotation stateside, the collapse of Saigon became evident to U.S. Defense planners in early 1975. Jacobs was called up 6 months earlier than anticipated to take command of USS Kirk, meet up with USS Hancock as she offloaded her air wing at Pearl Harbor, and escort her back to Vietnam where they would join Task Force 76, then amassing in the South China Sea off Saigon.

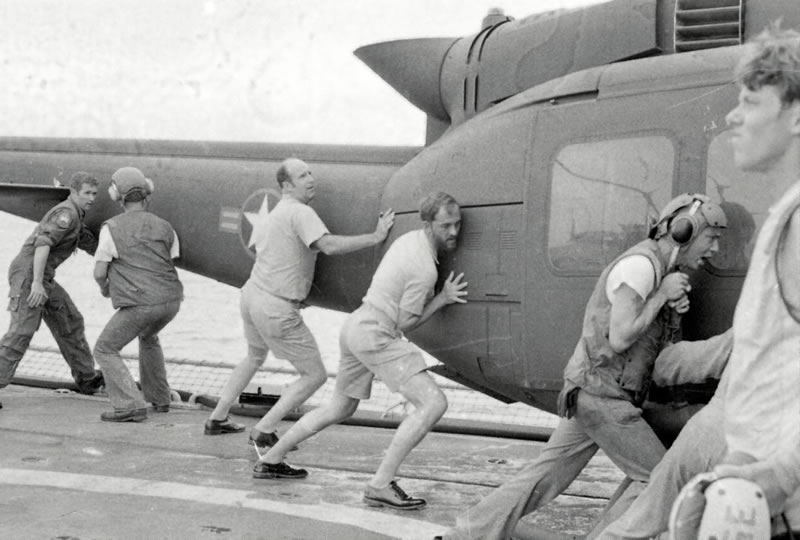
Paul Jacobs (3rd from left), joins his crew to push a Huey off Kirk's deck. This image has been reproduced in the El Dorado and Westminster memorials

In April 1975, USS Kirk participated in Operation Eagle Pull, providing security for the evacuation of Cambodia, was sent to Singapore for R&R, and was almost immediately recalled as North Vietnamese troops closed in on Saigon, putting Operation Frequent Wind into overdrive. The USS Kirk was on station the morning of April 29, again tasked with providing security for the larger carriers and amphibious ships of the task force assigned to receive evacuees being brought out by U.S. Air Force and Marine Helicopter Squadrons, as they did for Eagle Pull. It quickly became apparent that Frequent Wind would be much bigger than anticipated, as the skies were filled with hundreds of RVN Army, Air Force, and private aircraft who followed the official U.S. sorties out, all seeking somewhere to land.

Jacobs immediately instructed his deck crew to allow helicopters to land on Kirk's small helicopter pad, with RVNAF Maj Gen Trần Văn Minh the first to land. The crew initially pushed that helicopter as far forward next to shelter so another helicopter could land as the crew tried to calculate where they could store that helicopter to accommodate a third. Jacobs made the executive decision that he and his crew were to push the helicopters over the side to allow as many helicopters to land as possible.

By the end of the day, more than a dozen Huey and Bell 205 helicopters landed and were pushed over the side, saving some 200 South Vietnamese citizens and 2 Marines from a Bell AH-1 gunship that had run out of fuel providing air cover for U.S. ground forces in Saigon. When an RVN Army CH-47 Chinook arrived, too large to land with some 20 evacuees and bingo on fuel after being waved off by every other ship, Kirk's crew gathered on the fantail to catch jumping passengers as pilot Ba Nguyen hovered just overhead. Once everyone, including Ba's 10 month old daughter Mina was safely aboard, he flew the Chinook safely away from the ship where he jumped into the sea himself and ditched the Chinook.

Kirk's actions that day would have been enough to earn the crew commendations from the Navy. After Kirk offloaded her passengers to the larger vessels and prepared to get underway with the task force back home, Jacobs received a message from the task force commander, Admiral Don Whitmire, to come alongside his flagship and pick up DAO liaison officer to the Republic of Vietnam Navy (RVNN) and future deputy U.S. Secretary of State, Richard Armitage, saying, "We're going to have to send you back to rescue the Vietnamese navy. We forgot 'em. And if we don't get them or any part of them, they're all probably going to be killed.".

=== The Republic of Vietnam Navy ===
Armitage was an Annapolis grad who had previously served 3 tours in Vietnam as an riverine advisor to the RVNN, working closely with Captain Kiem Do, who would go on to become RVNN's last Deputy Chief of Staff. The U.S. had leased a number of ships to the RVNN and wanted to limit the number of ships and technology that would fall into the Vietnam People's Navy's hands. Armitage had been working with Do to convince as many captains of those ships as they could to refuse to surrender their commands and escape to the Philippines. They had an unspoken understanding that none of those captains or their crews would leave their families behind, and Armitage failed to report that detail to Washington. Jacobs was ordered to head to Côn Sơn Island 150 miles south of Saigon with Armitage, where they would meet Do and what remained of the RVNN fleet.

At Côn Sơn, Jacobs would find a ragtag fleet of 35 RVNN ships, fishing trawlers, and some 50 other smaller vessels in various states of seaworthiness, all completely filled with evacuees. The Kirk crew assisted where they could to help prepare vessels for the voyage, moving passengers from barely floating boats onto bigger vessels and scuttling the rest. Three of the RVNN ships were determined unable to make the voyage to U.S. Naval Base Subic Bay, the closest U.S. base to Saigon, over 1,000 miles (1,600 km) away, and scuttled as well. Between the initial evacuation the day before and the flotilla at Côn Sơn, the Kirk was transformed from a warship into a humanitarian aid station, providing food, medical care, and hope to a flotilla carrying over 30,000 refugees.

The flotilla formed a five-mile long convoy, travelling the speed of the slowest boat, 6 knots. By the time they reached the Philippines a week later, the Filipino government had recognized the legitimacy of the North Vietnamese government, so the ships couldn't enter Philippine waters. Jacobs and Armitage decided the only solution was to repatriate the 32 former U.S. Navy and Coast Guard ships, while some of the other private boats disappeared into smaller harbors along the way. Dozens of Kirk's junior officers, chiefs, and a number of petty officers were given their first command by Jacobs, sent to assume command from the RVNN captains as the flotilla entered Philippine waters as U.S. flagged ships. Armitage himself was tasked to assume command of the RVNN flagship, RVNS Trần Nhật Duật.

Jacobs's actions earned him the respect and gratitude of the Vietnamese refugee community, and many survivors have sought out he and the crew of Kirk to thank them for providing them the hope and opportunity to start over. Jacobs told NPR in 2010 that, "It was the high point of my career and I'm very proud of what we did, what we accomplished, how we did it."

=== Later career ===
Following the end of the war, Jacobs finished out his career as director of SOSUS, retiring as a captain in 1984. He would then serve as president of Veteran Resources Corporation, a professional services company providing engineering, management, and consulting on alternative energy generation to commercial and government clients. In 2018, he moved into his son Tyler's El Dorado, California home, where he died in 2020.

== Legacy ==
At least five late-term expectant mothers were part of the evacuation. One mother, Nguyen Thi Tuong-Lan Tran, gave birth to a daughter a couple weeks later at the refugee camp in Guam. The daughter was named Tran Nguyen Kirk Giang Tien in appreciation of the care given by Jacobs and the Kirk crew.

The Navy Medical Education and Training Command produced the documentary, The Lucky Few: The Story of USS Kirk, Providing Humanitarian & Medical Care at Sea in 2010. The documentary features interviews with Jacobs, Armitage, and Hospital Corpsman Stephen Burwinkel on the care they provided to the 30,000 refugees under their protection.

On 27 July 2021, the El Dorado County Board of Supervisors in California, where Jacobs lived out the last years of his life, honored Jacobs with a bronze plaque at the El Dorado County Veterans Monument in recognition of his heroism and leadership in Vietnam. The plaque depicts Jacobs and the crew of USS Kirk pushing a helicopter off the deck (pictured above)

The city of Westminster, California dedicated a similar plaque at the Sid Goldstein Freedom Park on 2 July 2023, in honor of Jacobs and the crew of the USS Kirk for saving the lives of some 30,000 Vietnamese refugees.
