= USS Aylwin (FF-1081) =

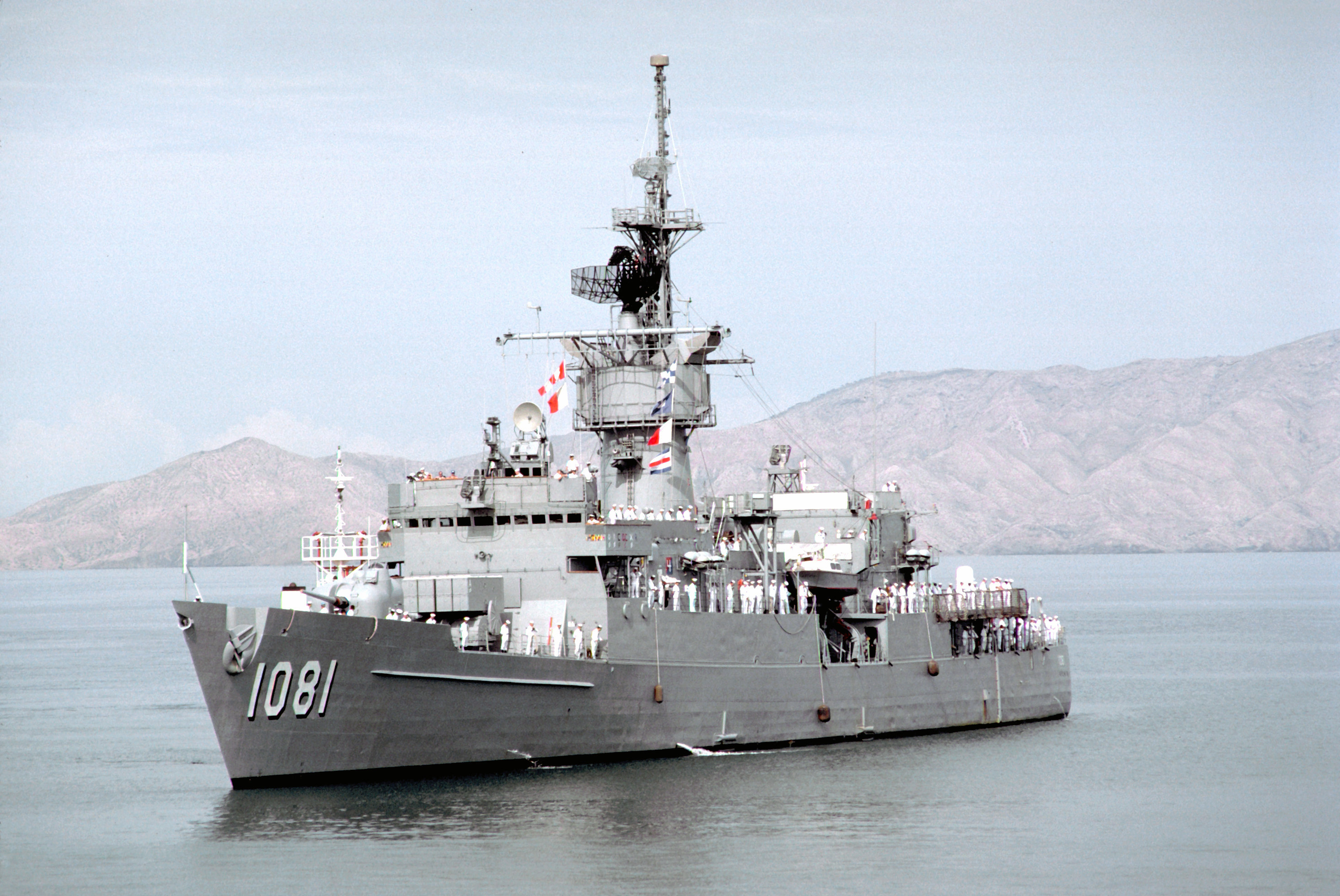
- USS Aylwin (FF-1081)

History

United States
- Ordered: 25 August 1966
- Builder: Avondale Shipyard, Westwego, Louisiana
- Laid down: 13 November 1969
- Launched: 29 August 1970
- Acquired: 3 March 1971
- Commissioned: 18 September 1971
- Decommissioned: 15 May 1992
- Stricken: 11 January 1995
- Motto: Courage Conquers the Impossible
- Fate: Transferred to Taiwan, 29 April 1998, as Ning Yang (FFG-938)

General characteristics
- Class & type: Knox-class frigate
- Displacement: 3,214 tons (4,194 full load)
- Length: 438 ft (134 m)
- Beam: 46 ft 9 in (14.25 m)
- Draught: 24 ft 9 in (7.54 m)
- Propulsion: 2 × CE 1200psi boilers; 1 Westinghouse geared turbine; 1 shaft, 35,000 SHP (26 MW)
- Speed: over 27 knots
- Endurance: ~60 days
- Complement: 18 officers, 267 enlisted
- Sensors & processing systems: AN/SPS-40 Air Search Radar; AN/SPS-67 Surface Search Radar; AN/SQS-26 Active Sonar; AN/SQS-35 IVDS Sonar; AN/SQR-18 Towed Array Sonar; AN/SQR-17A Sonar Signal (Sonobuoy) Processor Subsystem; MK-114 ASW Fire Control System; Mk68 Gun Fire Control System
- Electronic warfare & decoys: AN/SLQ-32 Electronics Warfare System
- Armament: one Mk-16 8 cell missile launcher for ASROC and Harpoon missiles; one Mk-42 5-inch/54 caliber gun; Mark 46 torpedoes from four single tube launchers; one Mk-25 BPDMS launcher for Sea Sparrow missiles (later replaced with one 20 mm Phalanx CIWS)
- Aircraft carried: one SH-2 Seasprite (LAMPS I) helicopter
- Aviation facilities: Expandable Hangar

USS Aylwin (FF-1081) was a United States Navy Knox-class frigate. She was the fourth vessel named for John Cushing Aylwin. Aylwin was laid down on 13 November 1969 at Westwego, La., by the Avondale Shipyard, Inc.; launched on 29 August 1970; sponsored by Mrs. Charles K. Duncan; and commissioned on 18 September 1971 at the Boston Naval Shipyard.

== Service history ==
=== 1971–1973 ===
Early in December, the destroyer escort sailed for her home port, Norfolk, Virginia, and arrived there on 10 December. After spending the holidays in port, Aylwin headed for Guantánamo Bay, Cuba, for shakedown training. While en roue, Aylwin stopped at Andros Island, Bahamas, for weapons testing. Arriving at Guantánamo Bay on 24 January 1972, the ship began four weeks of intensive training. She visited Santo Domingo for a liberty call before returning to Norfolk for post-shakedown availability. Late in October, the vessel participated in LAN-TREDEX 2-72 and then made final preparations for her first overseas deployment. On 1 December, Aylwin departed Norfolk to join the 6th Fleet in the Mediterranean. Her first stop was at El Ferrol, Spain. Departing that port on 13 December, she transited the Strait of Gibraltar and proceeded to Athens, Greece, where she spent the holiday season.

On 6 January 1973, Aylwin got underway for antisubmarine warfare (ASW) operations to be held in the eastern Mediterranean in conjunction with Task Force (TF) 60. The ship pulled into Golfe-Juan, France, on 17 January, then continued on to Gibraltar. Next came ASW operations in the eastern Mediterranean followed by a visit to Naples, Italy, for a two-week tender availability. The destroyer escort then visited Dubrovnik, Yugoslavia. On 17 February, she participated in NATO Exercise "National Week," held in conjunction with British, Italian, and Turkish warships. She arrived at Alanya, Turkey, on 28 February and then stopped at Athens; La Maddalena, Italy; Alicante, Barcelona, and Valencia, Spain; Tunis, Tunisia; Villefranche, Cannes, and Toulon, France; and Gibraltar. On 20 June, Aylwin got underway once more for the United States. She paused at the Naval Weapons Station, Yorktown, Virginia, on 27 June, to unload her weapons and returned to Norfolk the next day ending an absence of seven months. The ship was dry-docked from 19 July to 20 August. She received the light air multi-purpose system (LAMPS) modification during a yard period lasting through 26 October. A tender availability came in November, and December found the ship in a stand-down period.

=== 1974–1975 ===
The Destroyer Escort sailed on 19 February 1974 for refresher training at Guantánamo Bay. While there, she took part in ASW exercises in addition to testing her new LAMPS equipment. She returned to Norfolk on 27 April to make final preparations for her second overseas deployment. On 17 June, Aylwin set sail for the Mideast and the Indian Ocean. Her first stop was Roosevelt Roads, Puerto Rico, where she held gunnery exercises. She then proceeded to Trinidad & Tobago for a refueling stop. Aylwin next put into Recife, Brazil, for a brief liberty period.

She got underway again on the 28th to cross the Atlantic and arrived at Freetown, Sierra Leone, on 2 July. Aylwin's next stop was Luanda, Angola. Her visit there was curtailed by an outbreak of violence associated with that country's bid for independence from Portugal. The vessel weighed anchor on 13 July, sailed around the Cape of Good Hope, and entered the Indian Ocean. Aylwin arrived in Port Louis, Mauritius, on 26 July, and continued on to Reunion Island on 31 July. Her next stop was Moroni, Great Comoro Island. On 6 August, she arrived at Mombasa, Kenya. The destroyer escort got underway again on the 17th and spent the next two months patrolling the Gulf of Aden, the Red Sea, and the Persian Gulf. She made brief stops at Djibouti, Afars and Issas; Muscat, Oman; Bahrain; Bandar Abbas, Iran; and Massawa, and Asab, Ethiopia.

After final calls at Mombasa and Port Louis, Aylwin sailed on 8 November to return to the United States. She retraced her earlier course and made stops at Luanda, Angola, Recife, Brazil, and Roosevelt Roads before reaching Norfolk on 13 December.

=== 1975–1976 ===
The ship returned to sea in mid-February 1975 with a series of exercises in the Virginia capes area. On 17 March, she sailed from Norfolk, bound for the Narragansett Bay operating area to conduct a LAMPS test. During the cruise, she visited New York City and Albany, N.Y., before returning to Norfolk on 28 March. The next two months were occupied by a series of inspections. On 12 June, Aylwin sailed for Newport, R.I., to conduct a midshipman training cruise. While on this assignment, Aylwin was officially reclassified a frigate and redesignated FF-1081 on 1 July. She returned to Norfolk on 3 July. The ship sailed on 7 August for Guantánamo Bay and the fleet exercise CARIBEX. The next day, she experienced mechanical difficulties and proceeded to the Charleston Naval Shipyard for repairs. After two more attempts to sail to the Caribbean, Aylwin turned back to Norfolk on 27 August. After a month of repairs and preparations, the frigate sailed on 3 October for the Mediterranean. She reached Rota, Spain, on 13 October and was scheduled to take part in exercises. However, a boiler problem necessitated a run to Naples, Italy, for a two-week availability alongside tender Piedmont (AD-17). With the repairs completed, Aylwin set sail for Toulon, France, on 2 November to join NATO forces in Exercise "Isle d'Or." Following this operation, Aylwin arrived in Palermo, Sicily, on 20 November. Additional visits were made at Athens, Greece; Souda Bay, Crete; and Kusadasi, Turkey. Aylwin returned to Naples on 22 December 1975 for the Christmas holidays.

On 7 January 1976, Aylwin got underway with Task Group (TG) 60.1 for ASW exercises. She then sailed to the ports of Piraeus, Greece; Souda Bay; Bodrum, Turkey; Catania, Sicily; Valencia, Spain; Palma, Majorca; and Gaeta and Genoa, Italy. Aylwin briefly stopped once again at Rota on 17 April, then left the Mediterranean, bound for Norfolk where she spent May and early June in leave and upkeep. A week of ASW exercises came in mid-June. On 26 July, Aylwin proceeded to Philadelphia, Pennsylvania, where she entered drydock at the naval shipyard on 8 August for overhaul.

=== 1977–1978 ===
The frigate departed Philadelphia on 6 June 1977 and steamed to her new home port, Charleston, S.C. There, she became a unit of Destroyer Squadron 20. During the next six weeks, Aylwin conducted local operations; and, on 18 July, she headed for the Caribbean and refresher training. She was back in Charleston on 20 September and spent the rest of the year in training exercises and inspections.

Aylwin put to sea on 3 January 1978 to provide submarines Sand Lance (SSN-660) and Sturgeon (SSN-637) services as a target as they sharpened their hunting skills. The next day, she was directed to proceed to the Key West, Florida, area to conduct surveillance operations and relieve destroyer Robert A. Owens (DD-827). She finished these duties on 10 January and arrived back at Charleston on the 11th. The next three months were devoted to local operations and preparations for overseas movement. Aylwin rendezvoused with other units of Cruiser-Destroyer Group 12 off Bermuda on 7 April and sailed across the Atlantic to Malaga, Spain. A series of ASW exercises followed; and, on 29 April, the frigate moored alongside tender Howard W. Gilmore (AS-16) at La Maddalena, Sardinia, for an availability. On 14 May, Aylwin put to sea, bound for Souda Bay. There, she joined NATO forces for Exercise "Dawn Patrol". Following that operation, the ship anchored at Skiathos, Greece, on 1 June. Her other ports of call during the cruise were Barcelona, Spain; Golfo di Palmas, Sardinia; St. Tropez France, Alexandria, Egypt, Haifa, Israel, Piraeus, Greece, Palma, Mallorca and Toulon, France. The last exercise of the deployment was Exercise "Display Determination," which lasted from 26 September to 8 October. Following a final stop at Malaga, Aylwin set sail on 14 October for Charleston. She arrived at her home port 11 days later and spent the remainder of 1978 there undergoing upkeep.

=== 1979 ===
The ship devoted January and February 1979 to training and inspection and, on 26 February, began a restricted availability. She got underway again on 6 April for a dependents' cruise and, 10 days later, proceeded to Puerto Rico for refresher training. From 1 to 8 May, Aylwin took part in SUBASWEX 3-79. After completing this exercise, she sailed to New York City for the celebration of Armed Forces Week. The frigate returned to Charleston late in May and commenced a series of tests and inspections prior to beginning her next overseas deployment.

On 1 August, Aylwin got underway for another Mideast cruise. She made refueling stops at Bermuda and Ponta del Gada before reaching Rota on 11 August. From Rota, she headed to Malaga and then continued eastward. She passed through the Suez Canal on 19 August and arrived in Jidda, Saudi Arabia, on the 22nd. She moved south on 1 September to the Gulf of Aden, thence steamed around the Arabian peninsula and through the Strait of Hormuz to reach Bahrain. The frigate got underway on the 4th to operate in the Persian Gulf and pulled into Dammam, Saudi Arabia, on 16 September for two days of liberty. Aylwin took part in a joint exercise with Saudi forces, then stopped at Bahrain for refueling. She proceeded to the Seychelles Islands on 8 October, but her stay was shortened by civil unrest. On 13 October, Aylwin sailed for Djibouti. From there, she headed into the Gulf of Aden to conduct an exercise with warships of the French Navy on 22 October.

Aylwin steamed eastward and then north around the Arabian peninsula to pass through the Strait of Hormuz, where she participated in an exercise with naval forces from Oman. The frigate then sailed to Bahrain for a two-week upkeep period. That respite ended abruptly on 4 November when she got underway only two hours after learning that militant Iranian students had stormed into the United States embassy in Tehran and made captives of American diplomatic and military personnel. The frigate headed back into the Persian Gulf for surveillance and patrol duties that lasted until 9 December. On that day, Aylwin began the long voyage home. She paused at Djibouti to refuel, then sailed north, transited the Suez Canal, and continued across the Mediterranean to Rota, Spain, where she arrived on 23 December. After celebrating Christmas in that Spanish port, Aylwin sailed for Charleston on 28 December 1979. Following a stormy Atlantic crossing, she stood into Charleston, S.C., on 7 January 1980.

=== 1980–1982 ===
The frigate completed post-deployment stand-down on 6 February and spent the next two weeks making minor repairs. On the 19th, Aylwin returned to sea to conduct drills with Atlantic Fleet submarines. She carried out such routine training missions along the eastern seaboard until the end of April. On the 28th, the warship departed Charleston and set course for Brooklyn, N.Y., where she entered the yard at the Coastal Drydock & Repair Corp. for a major overhaul. The repairs – which included major work to her main propulsion plant, a period in drydock, and many lesser modifications – lasted a year almost exactly. She conducted sea trials on 29 and 30 April 1981 and returned to Charleston on 3 May 1981.

Soon thereafter, Aylwin embarked upon a lengthy period of operations out of Charleston. Those operations consisted of a series of exercises preparatory to certification in the operation of her propulsion system and of her varied ordnance systems. Refresher training in the West Indies followed qualification preparations early in September. The frigate concluded refresher training late in October and reentered her home port on the 25th. Duty out of Charleston continued through the end of 1981 into February 1982. Late in February, Aylwin suffered damage to her high-pressure turbine that interrupted her training schedule until mid-April. The warship resumed exercises on 12 April with READEX 5-82 in preparation for a deployment to the Mediterranean planned for June.

=== 1982 ===
On 8 June 1982, the frigate steamed out of Charleston on her way across the Atlantic. In spite of damage she suffered in a collision with support ship Seattle (AOE-3) during an underway refueling operation, Aylwin continued on to Rota, Spain, and arrived there on the 19th. She entered the Mediterranean Sea on the 20th, but ended up in Marseille, France, for shipyard repair. and joined a carrier task group built around carrier Forrestal (CV-59). The warship's arrival in the Mediterranean came in the immediate aftermath of the 6 June Israeli drive into Lebanon against the Palestine Liberation Organization (PLO) based there. Serious though conditions in Lebanon were, Aylwin carried out normal 6th Fleet operations, including a freedom of navigation mission across Libyan president Muammar al-Gaddafi's "Line of Death" into the Gulf of Sidra, until the latter part of August. By then, American diplomat Philip Habib had defused the situation in Lebanon by extracting an agreement from the contending parties which called for the departure of the PLO from Lebanese soil. Aylwin served as escort for two of the merchant ships providing transportation. On 21 and 22 August, she convoyed the Greek ship SS Sol Georguis from Beirut to Cyprus with the first contingent of PLO evacuees. Returning to Beirut on the 23d, the frigate shepherded SS Alkyon thence through the Suez Canal to Aden, where the ships arrived on 29 August. Reversing course that same day, Aylwin stopped in Djibouti, Djibouti, to refuel and take on supplies before retransiting the canal and headed for a liberty call at Palma de Mallorca, Spain.

The warship put to sea again on 14 September to conduct antisubmarine warfare (ASW) exercises in the western Mediterranean. That same day, the Lebanese president-elect Bachir Gemayel lost his life to assassins. That event and the massacres it sparked prompted France, Italy, and the United States to reconstitute the multinational force that had overseen the PLO evacuation. As a consequence, Aylwin broke off from Operation "Display Determination" and hurried east in company with carrier Independence (CV-62) to support the reentry of the multinational force into Lebanon. Except for an 11-day visit to Gaeta, Italy, in mid-October, for repairs and liberty, the frigate patrolled the waters off Lebanon until the middle of November.

Following a liberty call at Piraeus, Greece, between the 18th and the 21st, Aylwin headed for the strategic Straits of the Bosporus and the Dardanelles. Passing through the Straits, she conducted training evolutions with destroyer William V. Pratt (DDG-44) in the Black Sea before calling at Istanbul, Turkey, on 26 November. The warship passed through the Straits again on the 28th and conducted operations south of Crete until 7 December when frigate Connole (FF-1056) relieved her. Aylwin then laid in a course for Rota, Spain, on the first leg of the voyage back to the United States. The stop at Rota took up two days, and, on 12 December, she embarked upon the Atlantic passage in company with 15 other Navy ships. Aylwin reached Charleston on 22 December.

=== 1983–1985 ===
For most of the first five months of 1983, the frigate carried out no operational activity. Post-deployment standdown lasted well into January while an extended maintenance period occupied February and the better part of March. On 23 and 24 March, she made an overnight passage from Charleston to Norfolk, where she entered the drydock on the 24th. Work on her hull and sonar dome took up the next five weeks after which Aylwin returned to Charleston to prepare for a deployment to northern European waters.

On 29 May, she stood out of Charleston on her way to participate in Operation "United Effort/Ocean Safari '83" which included operations in the Baltic Sea. During that tour of duty the warship also made port calls at Portsmouth, England, on two occasions, and at Malmo, Sweden, and Aalborg, Denmark, once each. Aylwin returned to Charleston on 25 July and stayed there until the beginning of September. The frigate put to sea again on 2 September and headed south for a four-week assignment in the Caribbean Sea that included calls at a number of tropical ports that include the Bahamas, St. Kitts, Antigua, Venezuela, and Colombia. Back in Charleston on 4 October, she spent the remainder of 1983 engaged in operations along the east coast.

During the first three months of 1984, Aylwin left Charleston only once, as part of a task group built around Saratoga (CV-60) to conduct a readiness exercise during the first three weeks of February. Otherwise, she carried out maintenance and repair work that included the removal of her basic point defense surface missile system and its replacement with the phalanx close-in weapons system for antiaircraft defense. Between her return to Charleston from the readiness exercise late in February to the beginning of April, the warship concentrated on preparations for her impending assignment to the 6th Fleet in the Mediterranean Sea. She stood out of Charleston on 2 April in company with Julius A. Furer (FFG-6), Sellers (DDG-11), and Semmes (DDG-18). Aylwin and her three traveling companions made the Atlantic passage in 10 days and joined the 6th Fleet on 13 April. In the course of her six-month tour of duty in the Mediterranean, the frigate participated in two NATO exercises, a number of exercises with units of the 6th Fleet, and the ubiquitous independent ASW evolution. She punctuated her training duties with port visits throughout the "middle sea." Relieved by Elmer Montgomery (FF-1082) at Tangier, Morocco, Aylwin got underway to return home on 24 October.

She arrived back in Charleston on 2 November and, after a somewhat abbreviated leave and upkeep period, entered the Charleston Naval Shipyard on the 26th for a three-month availability that stretched into four. On 8 April 1985, Aylwin returned to sea to carry out refresher training in the vicinity of Guantánamo Bay, Cuba. The frigate completed that mission in mid-May and spent a week in Charleston before heading back to the West Indies on 24 May on a midshipman training cruise. She concluded her second cruise to the tropics at Charleston on 12 June and launched into a routine of inspections, upkeep, and minor repairs. During the first part of August, Aylwin voyaged to Vieques Island, near Puerto Rico, for shore bombardment drills.

Back in Charleston on 12 August, she began preparations to visit northern European waters and the Baltic Sea. She embarked upon that two-month assignment on 26 August participating in Exercise "Ocean Safari '85 during the Atlantic crossing. After a call at Dublin, Ireland, between 22 and 27 September, the frigate sailed to the Baltic Sea. She stopped at Copenhagen, Denmark, and at Kiel, Germany, before carrying out training operations in the Baltic Sea. Aylwin made a final European port visit at Aalborg, Denmark, from 21 to 27 October and then got underway to return to the United States. She arrived back at Charleston on 6 November. Aylwin stayed at Charleston through the end of 1985 and for the first month of 1986. She went back to sea on 3 February 1986 to participate in FLEETEX 2-86 as part of the ASW screen for America (CV-66).

=== 1986 ===
The frigate returned to Charleston on 25 February and began two weeks of feverish activity preparing for an early deployment to the Mediterranean Sea. On 10 March, she stood out of Charleston in company with USS America once again and shaped a course for the Strait of Gibraltar. Aylwin and her colleagues passed into the Mediterranean on the 19th and became part of the 6th Fleet. Five days later, the warship joined in another freedom of navigation operation near Muammar al-Gaddafi's so-called "Line of Death." That evolution ended on the 28th, and the frigate followed it up with port visits to the Sicilian ports Taormina and Catania. She then conducted ASW operations south of Malta until 13 April when she rejoined America's screen. Aylwin provided antiaircraft and antisubmarine protection for America while the carrier's air group combined with Air Force bombers to strike targets in Libya in retaliation for apparent Libyan involvement in terrorist attacks carried out against United States' citizens.

The latest Libyan interlude ended on 27 April and, after another port call at Taormina, the frigate resumed more conventional 6th Fleet activities. In the ensuing weeks, she took part in two major exercises, and her crew enjoyed liberty in a number of ports. Aylwin completed turnover formalities at Tangier, Morocco, once again and got underway for the United States on 31 August. The warship reentered Charleston on 10 September. Except for two brief periods underway in December, she spent the rest of 1986 in port.

=== 1987–1991 ===
USS Aylwin began 1987 homeported in Charleston, South Carolina. Upon completion of the overhaul in June 1988, Aylwin steamed north to her new homeport of Newport, Rhode Island. Settled in Newport, Aylwin began a series of exercises and intensive training to help her prepare for an upcoming deployment. She spent eight weeks on a shakedown cruise in Guantánamo Bay, Cuba going through refresher training before participating in US law enforcement operations with the US Coast Guard in November 1988. On 19 April 1989, Aylwin was the first ship on the scene rendering assistance when USS Iowa BB-61 suffered a turret explosion. On 31 May 1989, Aylwin started her eighth major deployment and participated in eastern Mediterranean contingency operations in support of national objectives. Port visits to Cartagena, Spain; Alicante, Spain; Theoule-sur-Mer, France; Marseille, France; Naples, Italy; and Haifa, Israel. During this period Aylwin was nominated for the navy expeditionary medal. She returned to Newport, on 10 November 1989. In January 1990 USS Aylwin arrived in Boston for a four-month repair period. While entering Boston Harbor in heavy fog on the way to the shipyard, Aylwin collided with the tanker PLUTO at President Roads anchorage, suffering damage to her bow. After five weeks of refresher training and law enforcement operations, Aylwin was ready for her ninth and final deployment. On 1 July 1991, Aylwin departed for UNITAS XXXII under the command of USCOMSOLANT circumnavigating the South American continent. While traveling throughout South America, Aylwin visited nine countries, crossed the equator and transited the straights of Magellan. Aylwin returned home to Newport on 13 December 1991.

=== Decommissioning and transfer to Taiwan ===
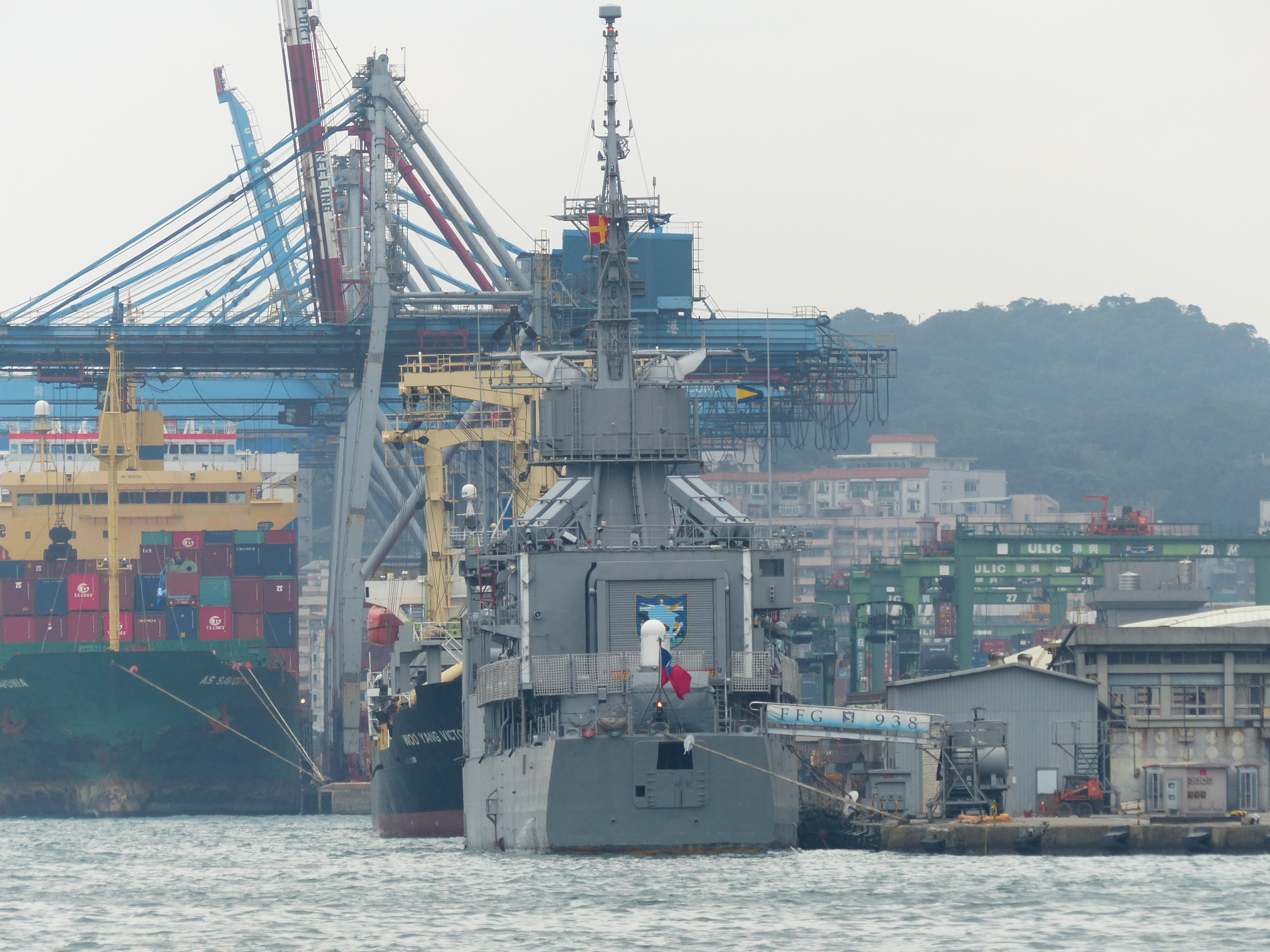
ROCN Ning Yang (FFG-938) Shipped in Keelung Port

Aylwin was decommissioned 15 May 1992 at Newport, and struck on 11 January 1995 to be disposed of through the Security Assistance Program (SAP), transferred, Foreign Assistance Act (FAA) Section 516, Southern Region Amendment, to Taiwan on 29 April 1998 as Ning Yang (FFG-938).

In mid-2007, the Ningyang warship completed the "Wu San Hua" project modification.

After the Ningyang warship started the overhaul project in 2024, the Republic of China Navy no longer overhauled the other ships of the same class. The Ningyang ship completed the overhaul in January 2025 and returned to the fleet. The ROCS Lan Yang, which was originally scheduled to be overhauled after the Ningyang ship, held a decommissioning ceremony in Kaohsiung on the 23rd of the same month, becoming the third ship of the same class to be decommissioned.
