= USS Brewton =

1971 Knox-class frigate of the US Navy

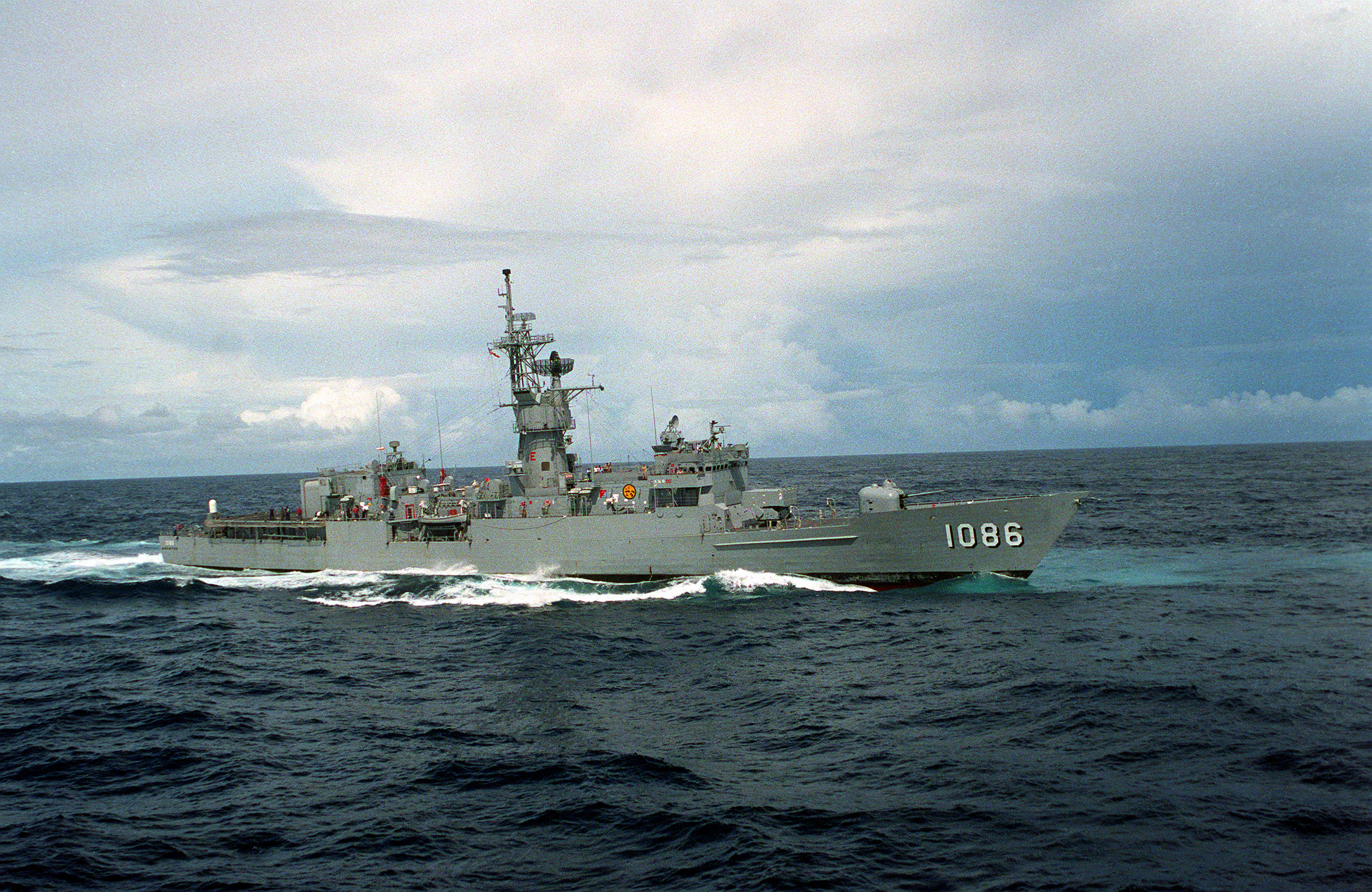
- USS Brewton (FF-1086)

History

United States
- Name: Brewton
- Namesake: Lt. John Brewton
- Ordered: 25 August 1966
- Builder: Avondale Shipyard, Westwego, Louisiana
- Laid down: 2 October 1970
- Launched: 24 July 1971
- Acquired: 18 June 1972
- Commissioned: 8 July 1972
- Decommissioned: 2 July 1992
- Stricken: 11 January 1995
- Motto: Dedicated, Determined, Prepared
- Fate: Disposed of through the Security Assistance Program (SAP), transferred, cash sale, ex-US fleet hull foreign military sale to Taiwan, 29 September 1999
- Status: In active service.

General characteristics
- Class & type: Knox-class frigate
- Displacement: 3,204 tons (4,184 full load)
- Length: 438 ft (134 m)
- Beam: 46 ft 9 in (14.25 m)
- Draft: 24 ft 9 in (7.54 m)
- Propulsion: 2 × CE 1200psi boilers; 1 Westinghouse geared turbine; 1 shaft, 35,000 shp (26 MW)
- Speed: over 27 knots (50 km/h; 31 mph)
- Range: 4,500 nautical miles (8,300 km; 5,200 mi) at 20 knots (37 km/h; 23 mph)
- Complement: 18 officers, 267 enlisted
- Sensors & processing systems: AN/SPS-40 Air Search Radar; AN/SPS-67 Surface Search Radar; AN/SQS-26 Sonar; AN/SQR-18 Towed array sonar system; Mk68 Gun Fire Control System
- Electronic warfare & decoys: AN/SLQ-32 Electronics Warfare System
- Armament: one Mk-16 8 cell missile launcher for ASROC and Harpoon missiles; one Mk-42 5-inch/54 caliber gun; Mark 46 torpedoes from four single tube launchers); one Phalanx CIWS
- Aircraft carried: one SH-2 Seasprite (LAMPS I) helicopter

USS Brewton (FF-1086) is a Knox-class frigate of the United States Navy and the first ship of her name. She is currently in service with the Republic of China Navy as the ROCS Fong Yang (FFG-933).

== Design and description ==
The Knox class design was derived from the Brooke-class frigate modified to extend range and without a long-range missile system. The ships had an overall length of 438 feet (133.5 m), a beam of 47 feet (14.3 m) and a draft of 25 feet (7.6 m). They displaced 4,066 long tons (4,131 t) at full load. Their crew consisted of 13 officers and 211 enlisted men.

The ships were equipped with one Westinghouse geared steam turbine that drove the single propeller shaft. The turbine was designed to produce 35,000 shaft horsepower (26,000 kW), using steam provided by 2 C-E boilers, to reach the designed speed of 27 knots (50 km/h; 31 mph). The Knox class had a range of 4,500 nautical miles (8,300 km; 5,200 mi) at a speed of 20 knots (37 km/h; 23 mph).

The Knox-class ships were armed with a 5"/54 caliber Mark 42 gun forward and a single 3"/50 caliber gun aft. They mounted an eight-round ASROC launcher between the 5-inch (127 mm) gun and the bridge. Close-range anti-submarine defense was provided by two twin 12.75-inch (324 mm) Mk 32 torpedo tubes. The ships were equipped with a torpedo-carrying DASH drone helicopter; its telescoping hangar and landing pad were positioned amidships aft of the mack. Beginning in the 1970s, the DASH was replaced by a SH-2 Seasprite LAMPS I helicopter and the hangar and landing deck were accordingly enlarged. Most ships also had the 3-inch (76 mm) gun replaced by an eight-cell BPDMS missile launcher in the early 1970s.

== US service ==
Brewton was launched 24 July 1971 and commissioned on 8 July 1972 and assigned to Destroyer Squadron 33 at Pearl Harbor.

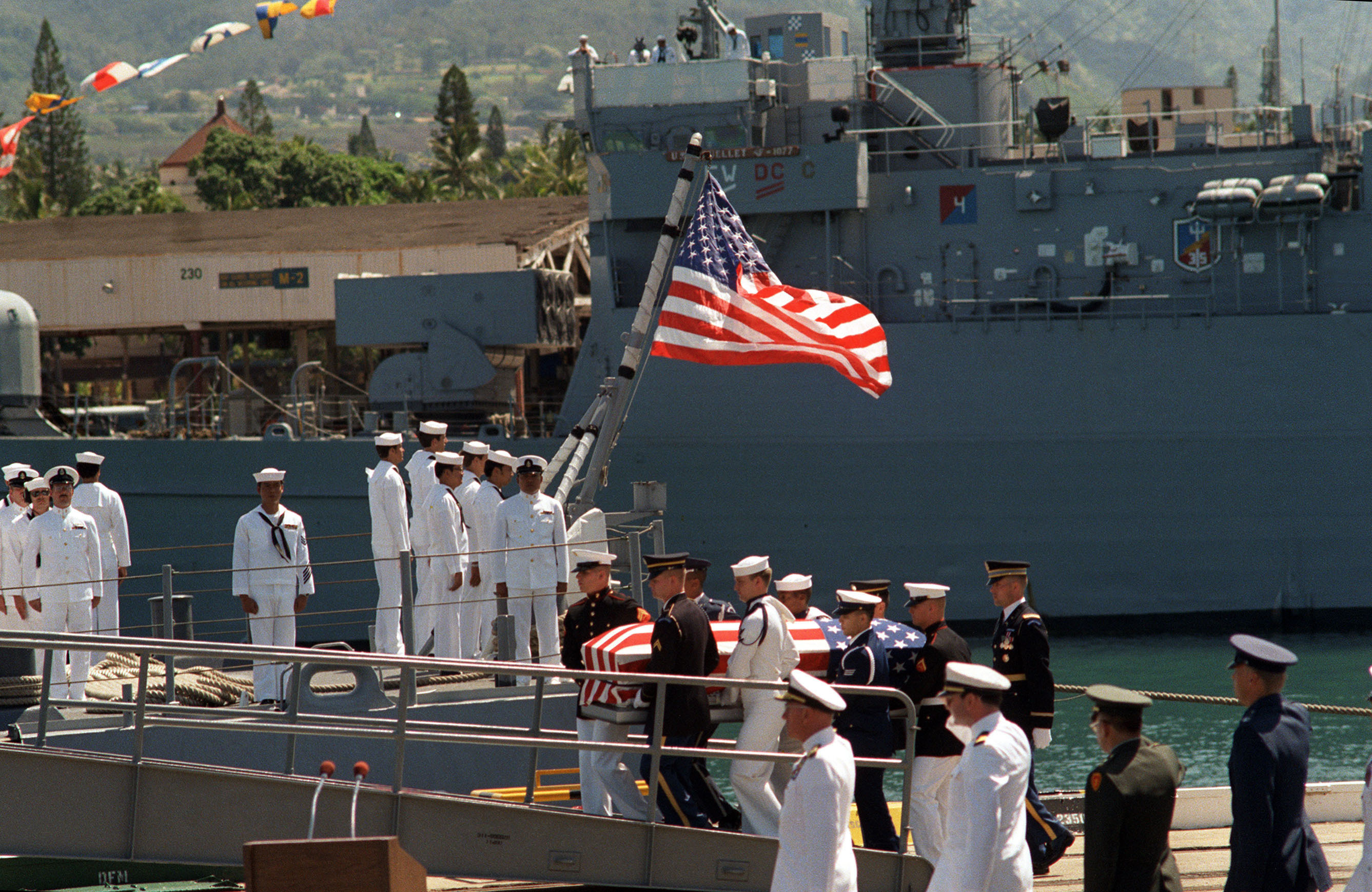
The casket of the Vietnam Unknown Soldier carried aboard Brewton, 17 May 1984

The body of the Vietnam Unknown Soldier was transported aboard Brewton to Naval Air Station Alameda, California in May 1984. The remains were then sent to Travis Air Force Base, California, 24 May. The Vietnam Unknown arrived at Andrews Air Force Base, Maryland, the next day.

She was decommissioned on 2 July 1992 at Naval Station Pearl Harbor after over 20 years of service, and struck from the Naval Register on 11 January 1995.

== Taiwanese service ==
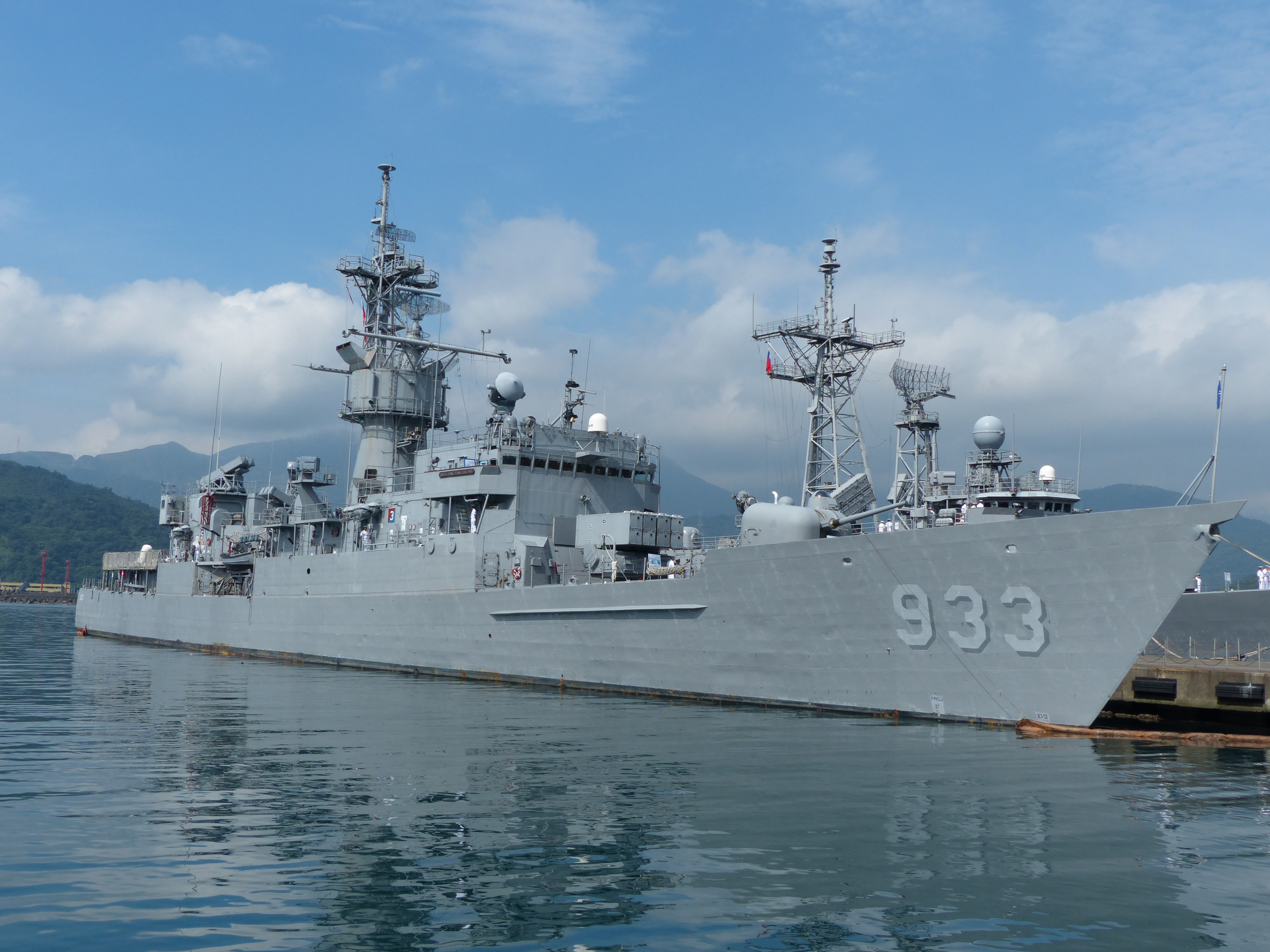
Fong Yang Shipped in No.12 Pier of Zhongzheng Naval Base

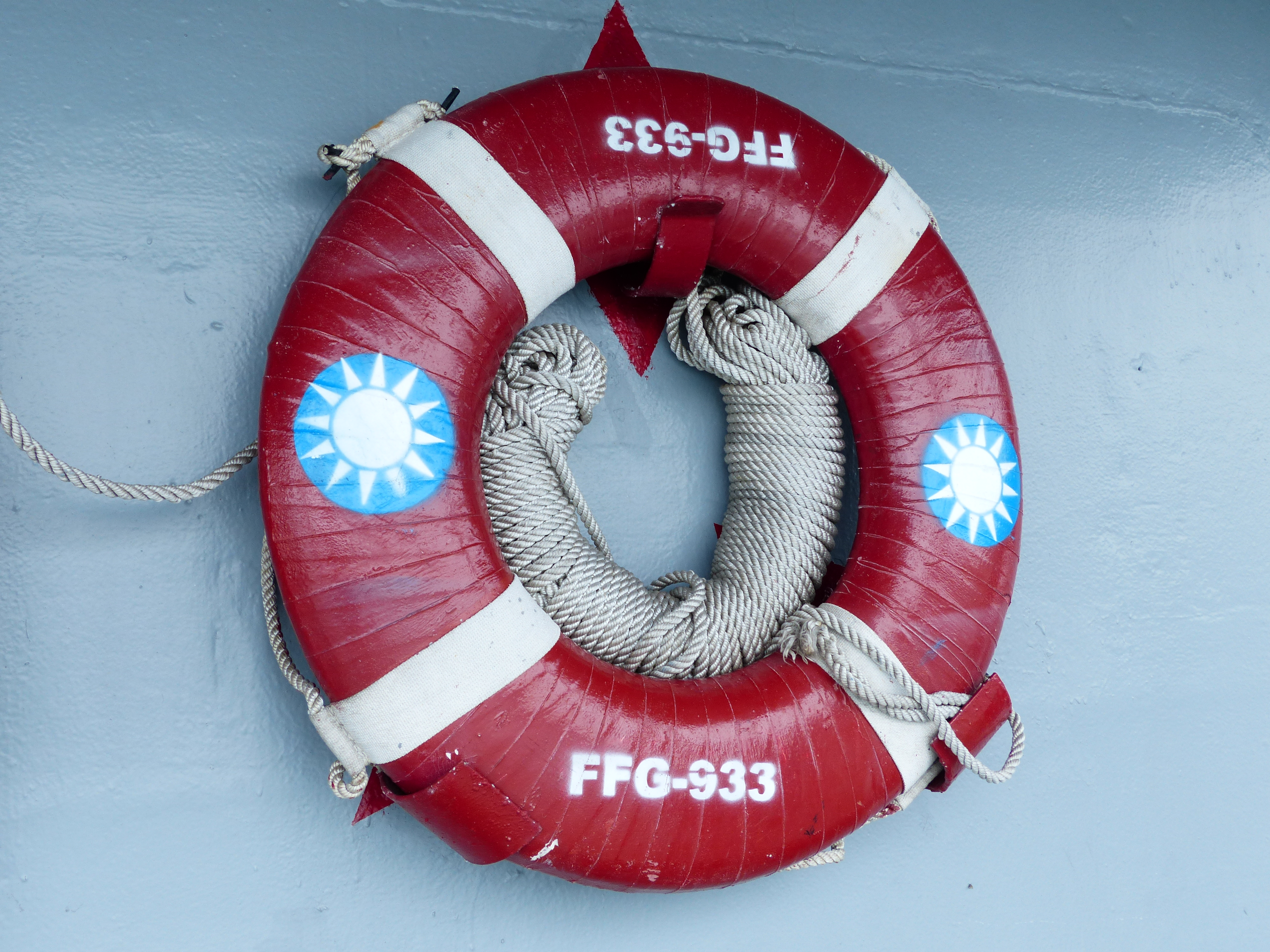
Lifebuoy of ROCN Fong Yang (FFG-933)

On 29 September 1999, she was sold to Taiwan under the Security Assistance Program, where she was renamed ROCS Fong Yang (FFG-933). She held a foreign sonar contact for 16 hours off of Taiwan's east coast. In March 2004, the Fong Yang warship entered the dock to start the "Wu San Hua" project. On October 31, 2004, the Fong Yang warship was completed. The work took 7 and a half months and the total cost was about NT$71.27 million. The remodeled Fong Yang warship not only retained its original anti-submarine capability, but also improved its poor air defense and self-defense capabilities. From March to April 2005, the firing test of standard missiles and Mk 42 5-inch naval guns was completed.

On June 21, 2005, the newly remodeled Fong Yang warship took on the task of demonstrating the fishing protection operation in the northeastern waters of Taiwan.

On August 6, 2022, the ship carried out patrol missions in the eastern waters. In order to protect the safety of merchant ships, it confronted the People's Liberation Army's Type 056A Yichun.

== Ship awards ==
- National Defense Service Medal w/ 1 star
- Southwest Asia Service Medal w/ 1 star
- Navy Sea Service Deployment Ribbon w/ 1 star
- Humanitarian Service Medal
- Joint Meritorious Unit Award
- Armed Forces Expeditionary Medal
- Kuwait Liberation Medal (Kuwait)
- Navy Battle "E" Ribbon

== See also ==
- USS Joseph Hewes (FF-1078)
- USS Kirk
