= USS Kirk =

Knox-class destroyer escort of the US Navy

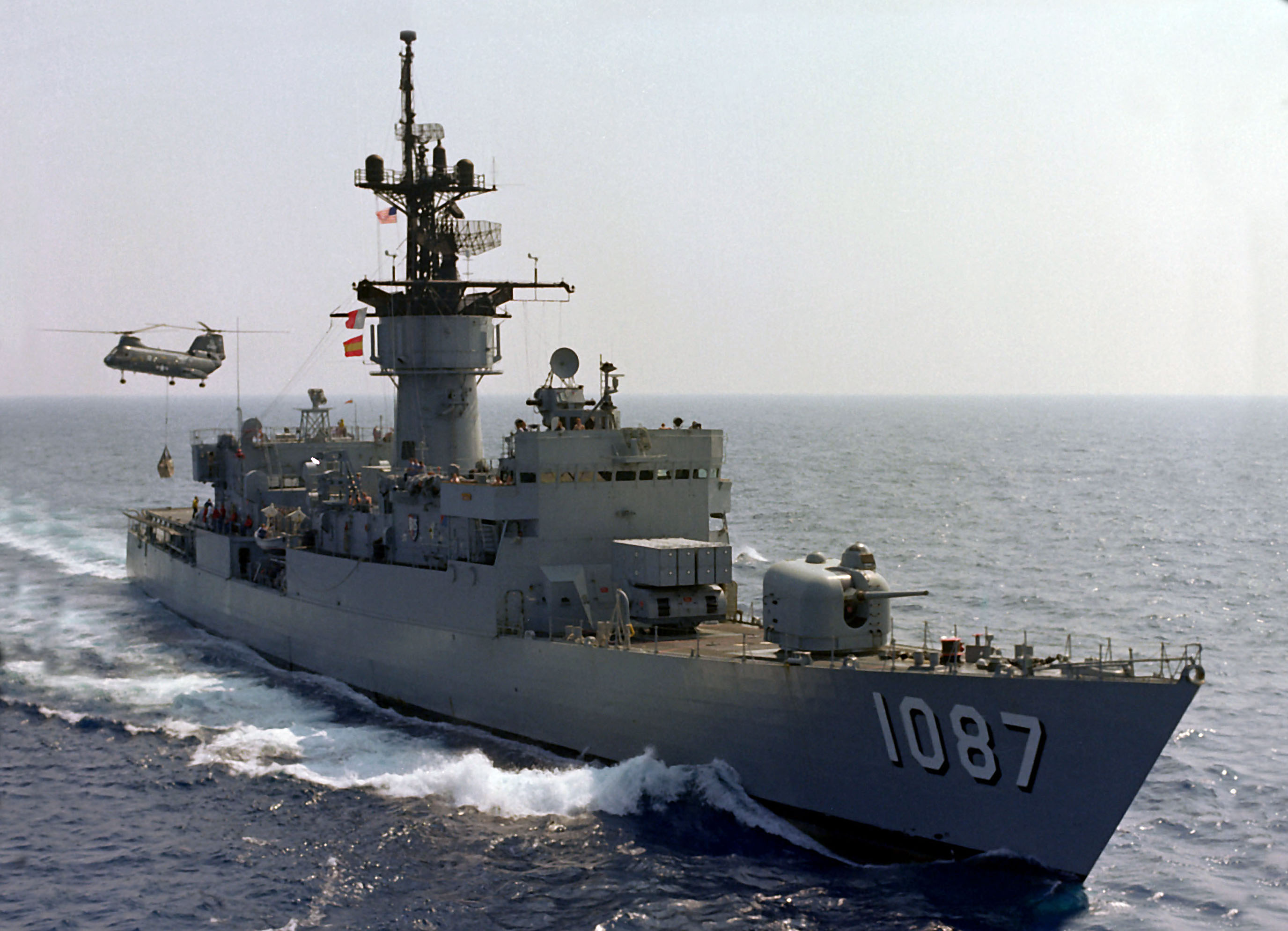
- USS Kirk

History

United States
- Name: USS Kirk
- Namesake: Alan Goodrich Kirk
- Owner: United States: Leased to Taiwan
- Ordered: 25 August 1966
- Builder: Avondale Shipyard, Westwego, Louisiana
- Laid down: 4 December 1970
- Launched: 25 September 1971
- Acquired: 27 August 1972
- Commissioned: 9 September 1972
- Decommissioned: 6 August 1993
- Stricken: 11 January 1995
- Identification: Hull number: 1087; Callsign: NBMR
- Nickname(s): The Lucky Few
- Notes: Transferred to Taiwan, as Fen Yang
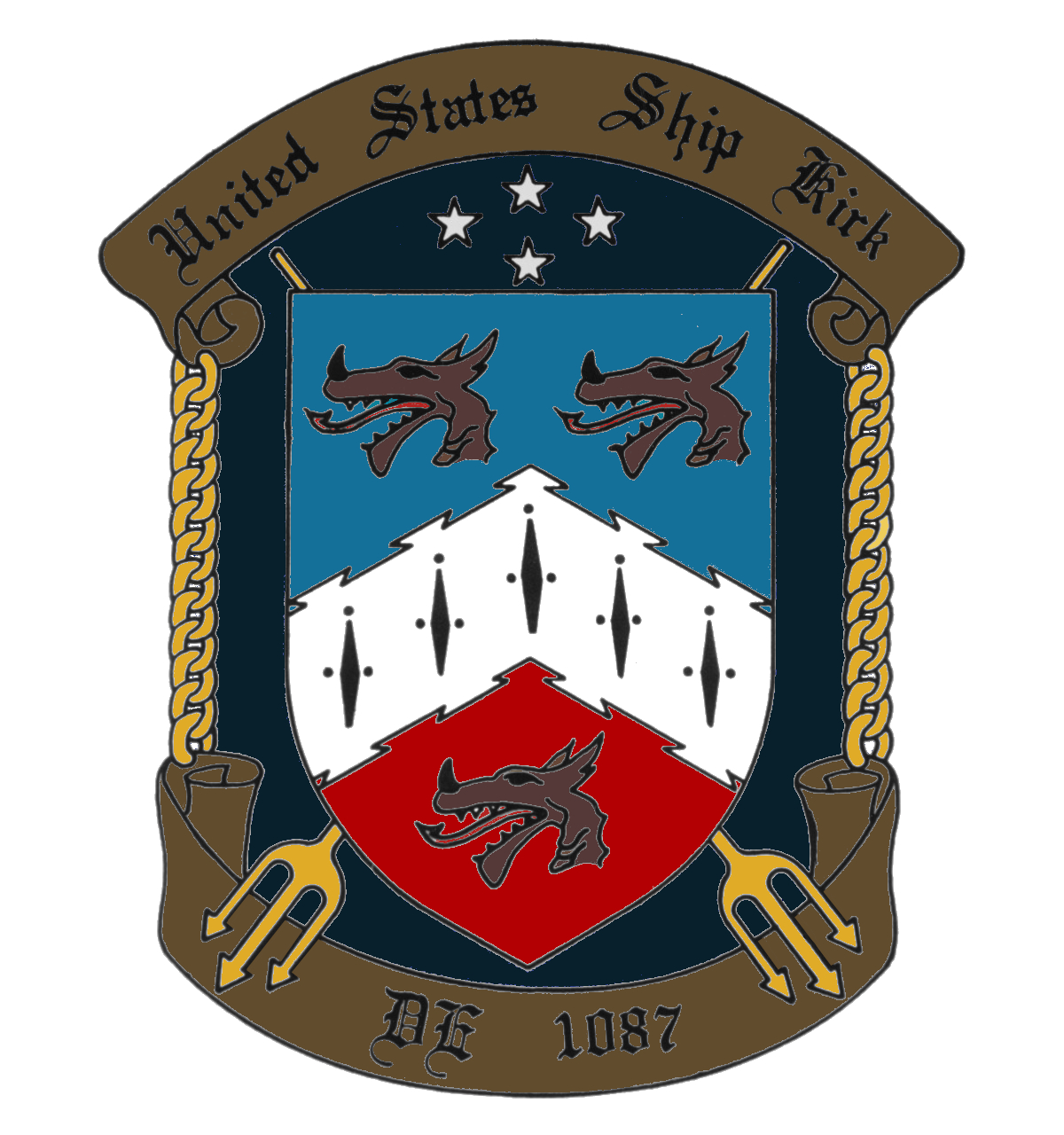
- Badge: Crest of USS Kirk

Taiwan
- Name: Fen Yang (Chinese: 汾陽)
- Namesake: Fenyang
- Acquired: loaned 6 August 1993; purchased 29 September 1999
- Commissioned: 6 August 1993
- Identification: Hull number: 934; Call sign: BCCG

General characteristics
- Class & type: Knox-class frigate
- Displacement: 3,221 tons (4,202 full load)
- Length: 438 ft (134 m)
- Beam: 46 ft 9 in (14.25 m)
- Draught: 24 ft 9 in (7.54 m)
- Propulsion: 2 × CE 1200psi boilers; 1 Westinghouse geared turbine; 1 shaft, 35,000 shp (26,000 kW)
- Speed: over 27 knots (50 km/h; 31 mph)
- Complement: 18 officers, 267 enlisted
- Sensors & processing systems: AN/SPS-40 Air Search Radar; AN/SPS-10 Surface Search Radar; AN/SPS-67 Navigation Radar; AN/SQS-26 Sonar; AN/SQR-18 Towed array sonar system; Prairie/Masker System; Mk68 Gun Fire Control System
- Electronic warfare & decoys: AN/SLQ-32 Electronics Warfare System
- Armament: 1 × Mk-16 8 cell missile launcher for ASROC and Harpoon missiles; 1 × Mk-42 5-inch/54 caliber gun; Mark 46 torpedoes from four single tube launchers); 1 × Phalanx CIWS
- Aircraft carried: 1 × SH-2 Seasprite (LAMPS I) helicopter

USS Kirk was a Knox-class destroyer escort, originally designated as DE-1087 and reclassified as a frigate, FF-1087 (1975), in the United States Navy. Her primary mission of anti-submarine warfare remained unchanged.

Named for Admiral Alan Goodrich Kirk, her contract was awarded to Avondale Marine on 25 August 1966. Sponsored by Lydia C. Kirk, Adm. Kirk’s wife, Kirk was laid down on 4 December 1970, launched on 25 September 1971 and commissioned on 9 September 1972 with Cmdr. James P. Kvederis as her plank owning commander.

She is in service with the Taiwanese navy as the ROCN Fen Yang (FFG-934).

== Service history ==
In April 1975, Kirk participated in Operation "Eagle Pull" (the evacuation of Phnom Penh, Cambodia), and Operation "Frequent Wind" (the evacuation of Saigon, South Vietnam).

During the evacuation, the Kirk became a makeshift landing pad for a stream of 14 helicopters flown by South Vietnamese airmen fleeing for their lives with their families and friends on board. Having only a small flight deck, Kirk had nowhere to store the helicopters, so the crew pushed all but three overboard into the South China Sea. Early on the morning of 30 April, while on station, the crew of the Kirk rescued two Marine pilots, after their AH-1J Cobra gunship crashed into the ocean near the ship. This was the last helicopter-gunship to be lost in the Vietnam War. The final refugees the Kirk received were literally tossed out of a hovering Boeing CH-47 Chinook that was too large to land on Kirk. Once the passengers were safely aboard, the pilot steered the craft about 50 yards (46 metres) aft of Kirk's stern, and jumped from the hovering helicopter. The craft then crashed into the water over the submerged pilot. He successfully surfaced and, after rescue by Kirk sailors, joined his family on board the American frigate.

As part of the U.S. fleet sent to facilitate the evacuation of Americans from South Vietnam, USS Kirk carried out one of the most significant humanitarian missions in U.S. military history. Commanded by CDR Paul H. (Jake) Jacobs and under the direction of a civilian, DAO liaison officer Richard Armitage, Kirk rescued the remainder of the South Vietnamese Navy, consisting of: 32 ships, many former U.S. Navy and Coast Guard ships, and some 30,000 Vietnamese refugees, leading and protecting the flotilla over 1,000 miles (1,609.3 km) from Vietnamese waters to U.S. Naval Base Subic Bay in the Philippines. From there, most of the refugees ultimately emigrated to the United States.

== Legacy ==
At least 5 late-term expectant mothers were part of the Frequent Wind evacuation. One mother, Nguyen Thi Tuong-Lan Tran, gave birth to a daughter a couple weeks later, at the refugee camp in Guam. The daughter was named Tran Nguyen Kirk Giang Tien, in appreciation of the care given by Jacobs and the Kirk crew.

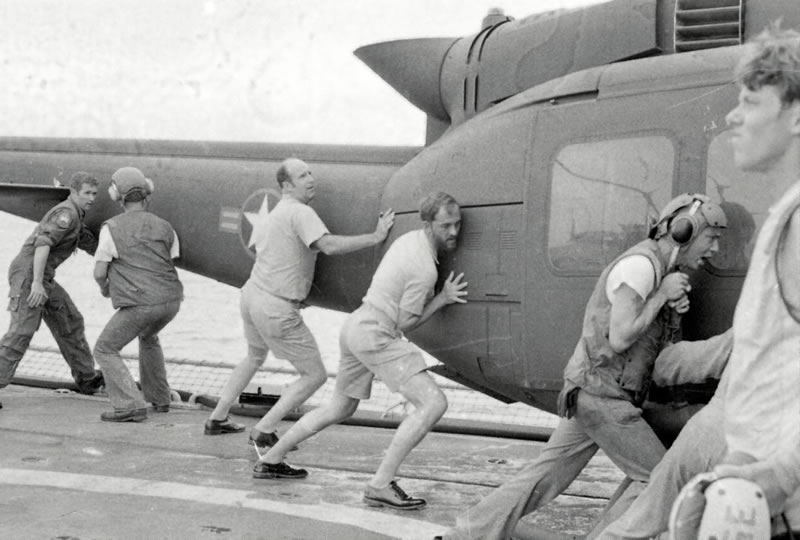
Capt Paul Jacobs (3rd from left), joins his crew to push a Huey off Kirk's deck. This image has been reproduced in the El Dorado and Westminster memorials

In 2010, under the direction of VADM Adam Robinson, then Surgeon General of the U.S. Navy, the Navy Medical Education and Training Command created a documentary entitled The Lucky Few: The Story of USS Kirk, Providing Humanitarian & Medical Care at Sea. It has since been translated into Vietnamese.

On 27 July 2021, the El Dorado County Board of Supervisors in California, where Jacobs lived out the last years of his life, honored Jacobs with a bronze plaque at the El Dorado County Veterans Monument, in recognition of his heroism and leadership in Vietnam. The plaque depicts Capt Paul Jacobs and the crew of USS Kirk pushing a helicopter off the deck.

The city of Westminster, California dedicated a similar plaque at the Sid Goldstein Freedom Park on 2 July 2023, in honor of Jacobs and the crew of the USS Kirk for saving the lives of some 30,000 Vietnamese refugees.

== Decommissioning and Taiwanese service ==
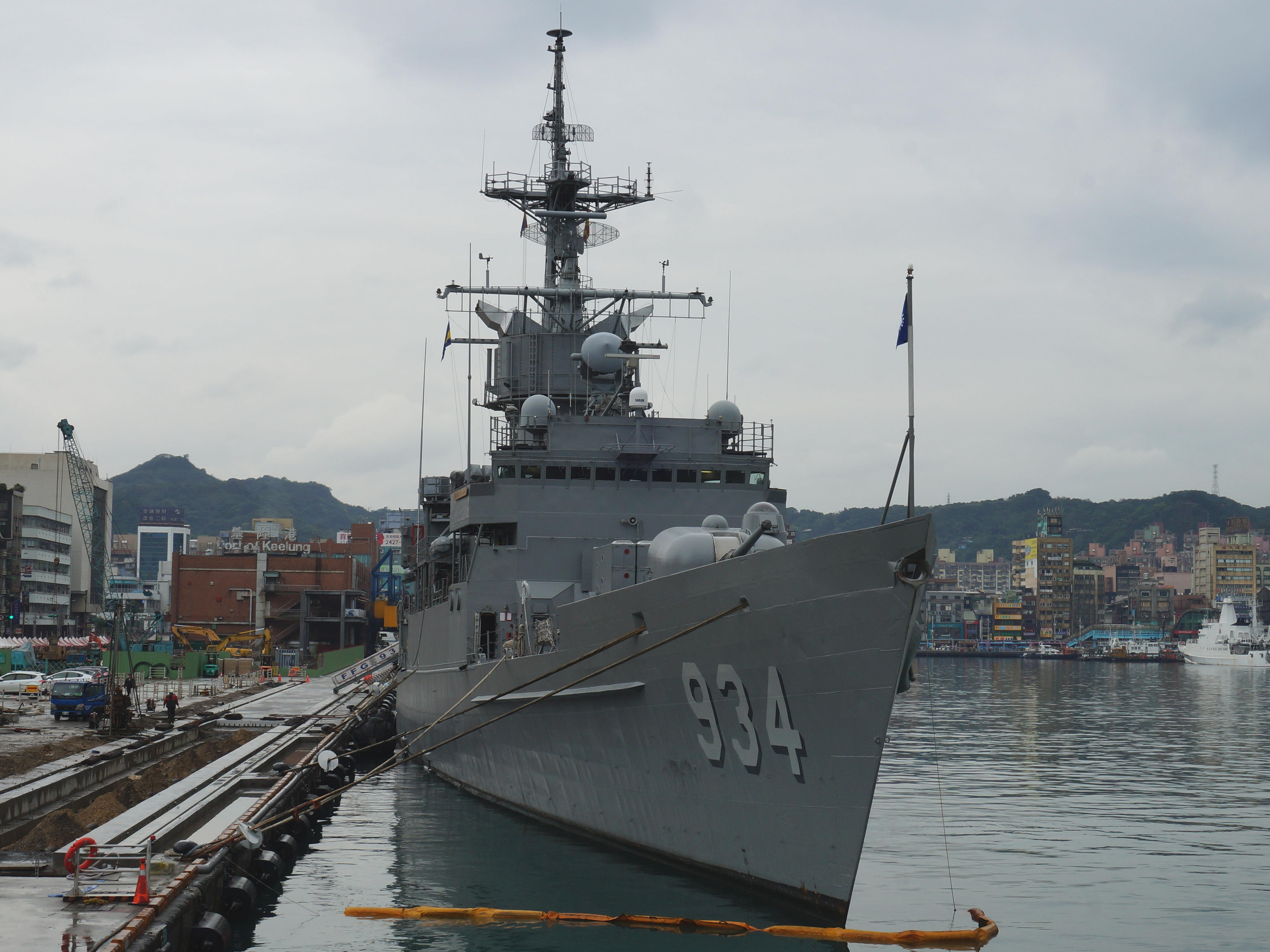
ROCN Fen Yang FFG-934 head in Keelung 20190324

She served in the U.S. Navy up until 6 August 1993, when the ship was decommissioned and leased to the Republic of China Navy in Taiwan. In Taiwanese service, she was renamed Fen Yang (Chinese: 汾陽) with the hull number changed to 934. On 29 September 1999, the ship was purchased by Taiwan.

On April 22, 1995, the Fen Yang warship (FF-934), which was in charge of the Dunmu Sailing Training Detachment, was conducting a round-the-island navigation training and passing through the Bashi Channel. A fire broke out in the steam pipe above the boiler room, located on the port side of the main deck. The fire was subsequently put out by the officers and soldiers on board.

In early 2008, the Fen Yang warship completed the "Wu San Hua" project modification.

On April 13, 2018, President of the Republic of China Tsai Ing-wen inspected the joint combat readiness test exercise at the Navy's Su'ao Base. The Kee Lung guided the ROCS Cheng Ho , the ROCS Tian Dan, the ROCS Fong Yang, Fen Yang ship, ROCS Su Ao and other ships to release jamming bombs to simulate a multi-bomb saturation attack on enemy warships.

== See also ==
- USS Brewton
- USS Cook (FF-1083)
- USS Joseph Hewes (FF-1078)
