= Harry Aylwin =

Australian rules footballer

Personal information
- Full name: Harold Sidney Aylwin
- Born: 16 December 1870; Redhill, Surrey
- Died: 1 June 1949 (aged 78); Mosman, New South Wales
- Original team: South St Kilda

Playing career^{1}
Years	Club	Games (Goals)
1897–99	St Kilda	29 (0)
- ^{1} Playing statistics correct to the end of 1899.

Harold Sidney Aylwin (16 December 1870 – 1 June 1949) was an Australian rules footballer who played with St Kilda in the Victorian Football League (VFL).

He later had a successful business career as head of the Australian business for J. & N. Philips.
