= Alvin (digital cultural heritage platform) =

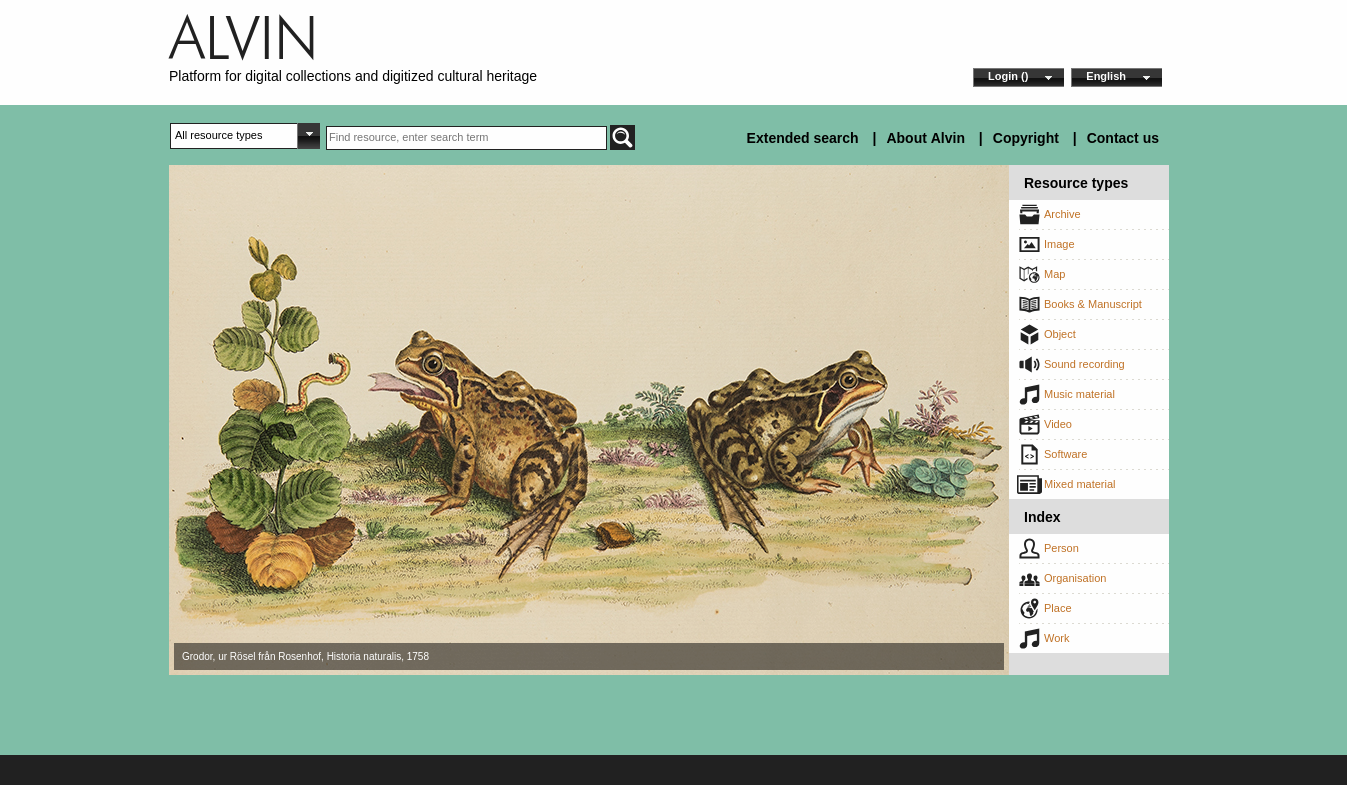
- A screenshot of Alvin, 2025
- Website type: Digital platform for cultural heritage in Sweden
- Owner: Alvin consortium
- Website: www.alvin-portal.org
- Commercial: No
- Registration: Yes
- Launched: November 28, 2014; 11 years ago
- Current status: Online
- Content license: CC0

Alvin is a national technical platform for the dissemination and long term preservation of digitised cultural heritage and digital collections in Sweden. The platform contains material from several Swedish cultural heritage organisations, and is operated and developed at Uppsala University Library in collaboration with Gothenburg University Library and Lund University Library through the Alvin consortium.

== History ==
Alvin as a system originated from several different projects that Uppsala University Library ran or participated in during a period between 2000-2014:

- Creating a database to handle Erik Waller's extensive autograph collection
- The management of the university library's digitized map and image collections through the image database Bildsök (sv. "Image Search")
- The provenance and material bibliographic database ProBok, which was a collaboration between Uppsala University Library and the University Library at Lund University
- The archive and handwriting infrastructure Ediffah, where several different Swedish research libraries collaborated

These differing and technically diverse projects had the management, operation and further development of these projects were both person-dependent and unsustainable in a long-term perspective.

The concept that then came to be Alvin was formulated in 2011 in a final report for the project LUPP. In order to remedy the person-dependence and to prevent services from losing their technical relevance over time, a common platform should be launched.

The basic technical development of Alvin took place between 2012 and 2014 during the infrastructure project ArkA-D. Finally, this project culminated in Alvin being launched at the conference Digitalisera - men sen då? (sv. "Digitise - but then what?"), at the Nordic Museum November 28, 2014.
