= Alvin (surname) =

Alvin is the surname of the following notable people:

- Abayomi Alvin (born 1993), Nigerian actor and model
- Danny Alvin (1902–1958), American jazz drummer and bandleader
- Dave Alvin (born 1955), American singer-songwriter, guitarist and producer
- Farah Alvin (born 1976), American theatre actress, daughter of John
- John Alvin (1948–2008), American cinematic artist and painter
- John Alvin (actor) (1917–2009), American film, stage and television actor
- Juliette Alvin (1897–1982), French-British cellist, viola da gamba player, and music therapist
- Phil Alvin (born 1953), American singer and guitarist
- Tom Alvin (born 1962), Australian rules footballer

== See also ==
- Allvin
