= Aylwin Lewis =

American businessman (born 1954)

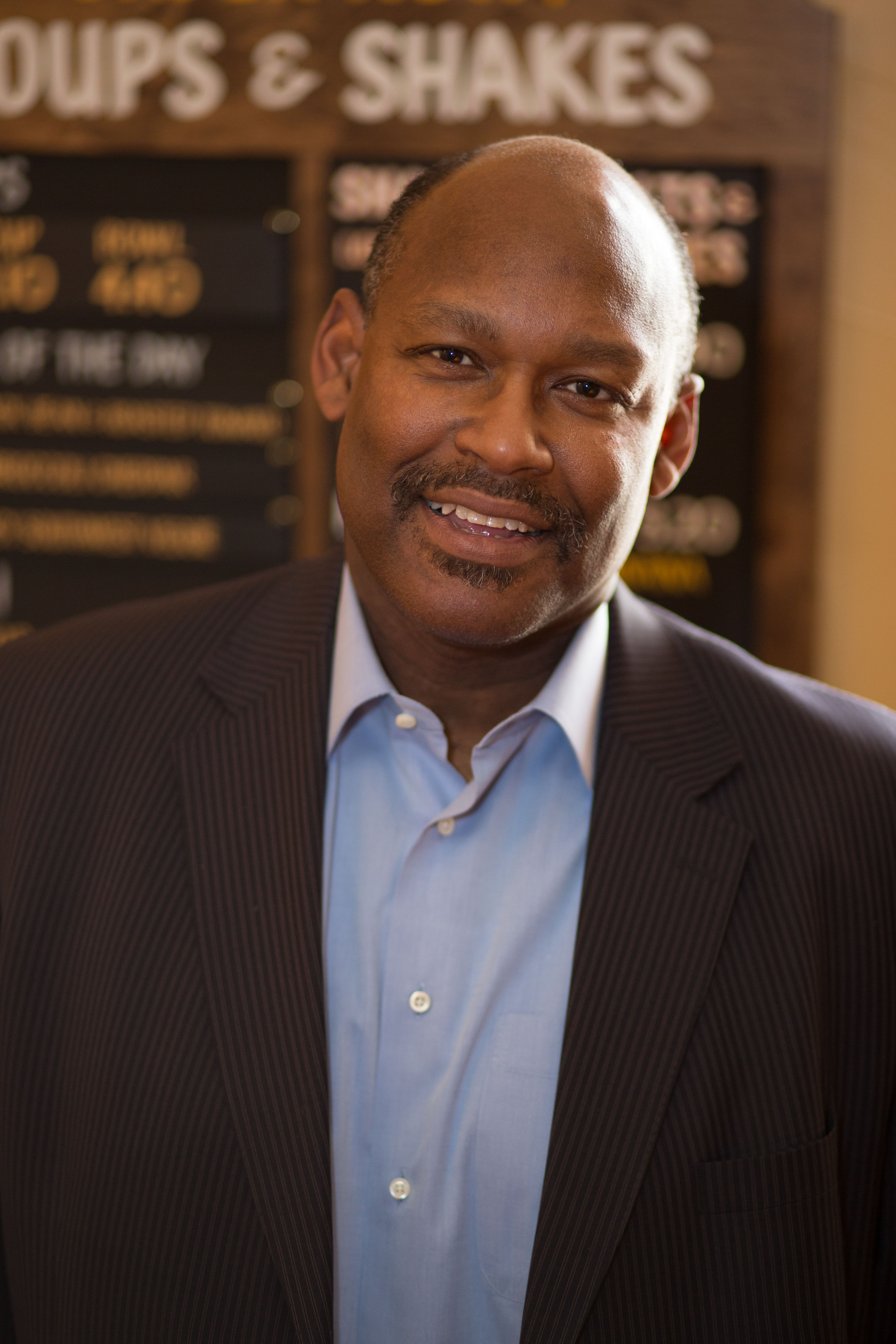
Aylwin B. Lewis

Aylwin B. Lewis (born May 28, 1954) is an American businessman and executive who served as a senior executive at Yum! Brands and as the CEO of Sears Holdings (2004–2008) and Potbelly Sandwich Works (2008–2017).

== Career ==
Lewis's first job out of college, where he attended the University of Houston, was as a district manager for Jack in the Box in Texas.

In 1995, Aylwin Lewis became senior vice president of operations development for KFC, a job he left in 1996 for a position as senior vice president of operations at Pizza Hut. In 1997, he was promoted to COO at Pizza Hut; in 2000, he became COO at Yum! Brands. In 2004, he became CEO of Kmart, which shortly thereafter merged with Sears. At this time, he became CEO of Sears Holdings.

Lewis resigned from Sears during a 2008 restructuring, prompted by falling sales and share prices, and joined Potbelly Sandwich Works as CEO that June. Between 2008 and 2013, when the company filed to go public, the company grew from 200 to 300 locations. Share prices dropped by nearly two-thirds between the initial public offering, as the company posted weak same-store sales results, and Lewis stepped down and left Potbelly in August 2017.

Lewis has also served on the boards of The Walt Disney Company, Red Robin, Halliburton, Starwood Hotels and Resorts, Marriott International, Rush University Medical Center, and Voya Financial.
