= Lund University Libraries =

Library network in Lund, Sweden

Coordinates: 55°42′32″N 13°11′50″E

- Biblioteken vid Lunds Universitet
- Location: Lund, Malmö, Helsingborg, Sweden
- Type: Academic
- Branches: 26

Collection
- Items collected: Books, journals
- Size: 2,767,679
- Legal deposit: Yes

Access and use
- Circulation: 478,655

Other information
- Employees: 243
- Website: www.lub.lu.se/en/

Lund University Libraries is a network of public research libraries in Lund, Sweden.

== See also ==
- List of libraries in Sweden

== Literature ==
- Steingrimur Jonsson (2001). "Lund University Library". In David H. Stam (ed.). International Dictionary of Library Histories. Routledge. pp. 426–427. ISBN 9781136777851.
