= USS Joseph Hewes (FF-1078) =

1970 Knox-class frigate

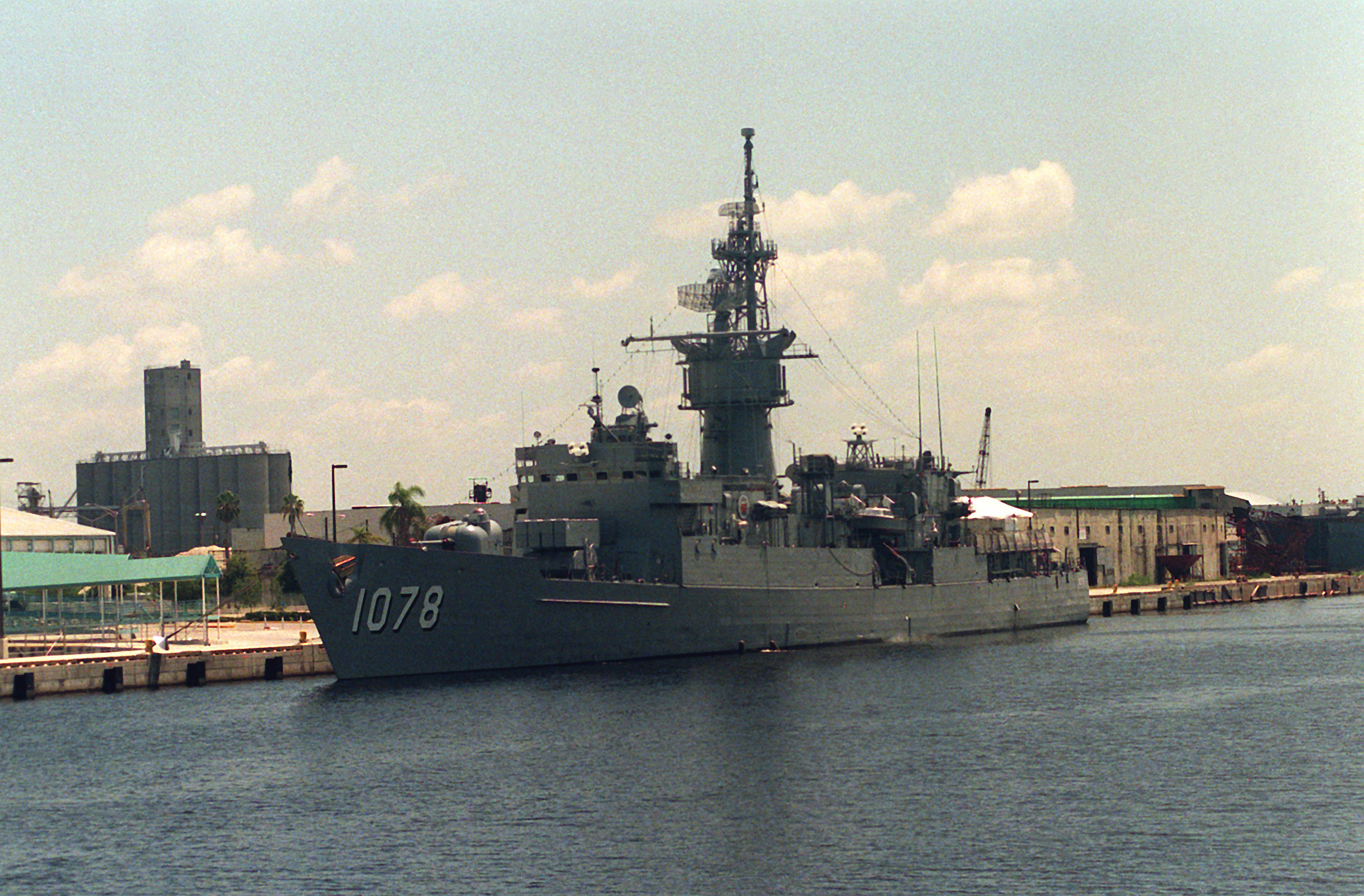
- USS Joseph Hewes (FF-1078)

History

United States
- Name: Joseph Hewes
- Namesake: Joseph Hewes
- Ordered: 25 August 1966
- Builder: Avondale Shipyard, Westwego, Louisiana
- Laid down: 14 May 1969
- Launched: 7 March 1970
- Acquired: 6 April 1971
- Commissioned: 24 April 1971
- Decommissioned: 30 June 1994
- Stricken: 11 January 1995
- Fate: Sunk as target on 18 September 2026

General characteristics
- Class & type: Knox-class frigate
- Displacement: 3,211 tons (4,192 full load)
- Length: 438 ft (134 m)
- Beam: 46 ft 9 in (14.25 m)
- Draught: 24 ft 9 in (7.54 m)
- Propulsion: 2 × CE 1200psi boilers; 1 Westinghouse geared turbine; 1 shaft, 35,000 SHP (26 MW)
- Speed: over 27 knots
- Complement: 18 officers, 267 enlisted
- Sensors & processing systems: AN/SPS-40 Air Search Radar; AN/SPS-67 Surface Search Radar; AN/SQS-26 Sonar; AN/SQR-18 Towed array sonar system; Mk68 Gun Fire Control System
- Electronic warfare & decoys: AN/SLQ-32 Electronics Warfare System
- Armament: one Mk-16 8 cell missile launcher for RUR-5 ASROC and Harpoon missiles; one Mk-42 5-inch/54 caliber gun; Mark 46 torpedoes from four single tube launchers); one Mk-25 BPDMS launcher for Sea Sparrow missiles, later replaced by Phalanx CIWS
- Aircraft carried: one SH-2 Seasprite (LAMPS I) helicopter

ROCS Lan Yang (FFG-935) was a Chi Yang-class frigate of the Republic of China Navy. She was also formerly in service as the USS Joseph Hewes (FF-1078), a Knox-class frigate of the United States Navy.

== Construction ==
Constructed by Avondale Shipyard, Westwego, Louisiana and laid down 14 May 1969, launched 7 March 1970, and delivered 6 April 1971. She was commissioned 24 April 1971, christened by Mrs. Caroline Groves Gayler.

== Design and description ==
The Knox class design was derived from the Brooke-class frigate modified to extend range and without a long-range missile system. The ships had an overall length of 438 feet (133.5 m), a beam of 47 feet (14.3 m) and a draft of 25 feet (7.6 m). They displaced 4,066 long tons (4,131 t) at full load. Their crew consisted of 13 officers and 211 enlisted men.

The ships were equipped with one Westinghouse geared steam turbine that drove the single propeller shaft. The turbine was designed to produce 35,000 shaft horsepower (26,000 kW), using steam provided by 2 C-E boilers, to reach the designed speed of 27 knots (50 km/h; 31 mph). The Knox class had a range of 4,500 nautical miles (8,300 km; 5,200 mi) at a speed of 20 knots (37 km/h; 23 mph).

The Knox-class ships were armed with a 5"/54 caliber Mark 42 gun forward and a single 3-inch/50-caliber gun aft. They mounted an eight-round ASROC launcher between the 5-inch (127 mm) gun and the bridge. Close-range anti-submarine defense was provided by two twin 12.75-inch (324 mm) Mk 32 torpedo tubes. The ships were equipped with a torpedo-carrying DASH drone helicopter; its telescoping hangar and landing pad were positioned amidships aft of the mack. Beginning in the 1970s, the DASH was replaced by a SH-2 Seasprite LAMPS I helicopter and the hangar and landing deck were accordingly enlarged. Joseph Hewes had the first deployed LAMPS helicopter in the history of the Navy. Aft of the flight deck was an eight-cell BPDMS missile launcher for Sea Sparrow missiles, later replaced by Phalanx CIWS.

== Modifications ==
The USS Joseph Hewes (FF-1078) and subsequent ships of the Knox-class frigate class were modified to enable them to serve as flagships. The primary change was a slightly different arrangement of the "Officer's Country" staterooms with additional staterooms in a new 01 level structure which replaced the open deck between the boats. The stateroom on the port side under the bridge was designated as a "flag" stateroom, with additional staterooms for flag staff when serving as a flagship. These ships have been referred to as the Joseph Hewes-sub-class.

== Service history ==
On 15 February 1985, Joseph Hewes arrived to the scene where the M/V A. Regina, a passenger cargo ferry ran aground on a reef off Isla de Mona. Due to surf conditions, Joseph Hewes was unable to use her boats to transport the evacuees which had landed on the nearby island. Joseph Hewes remained on scene to assist and using her helicopter, delivered hot food, soft drinks, and water to the A. Regina evacuees on Mona Island.

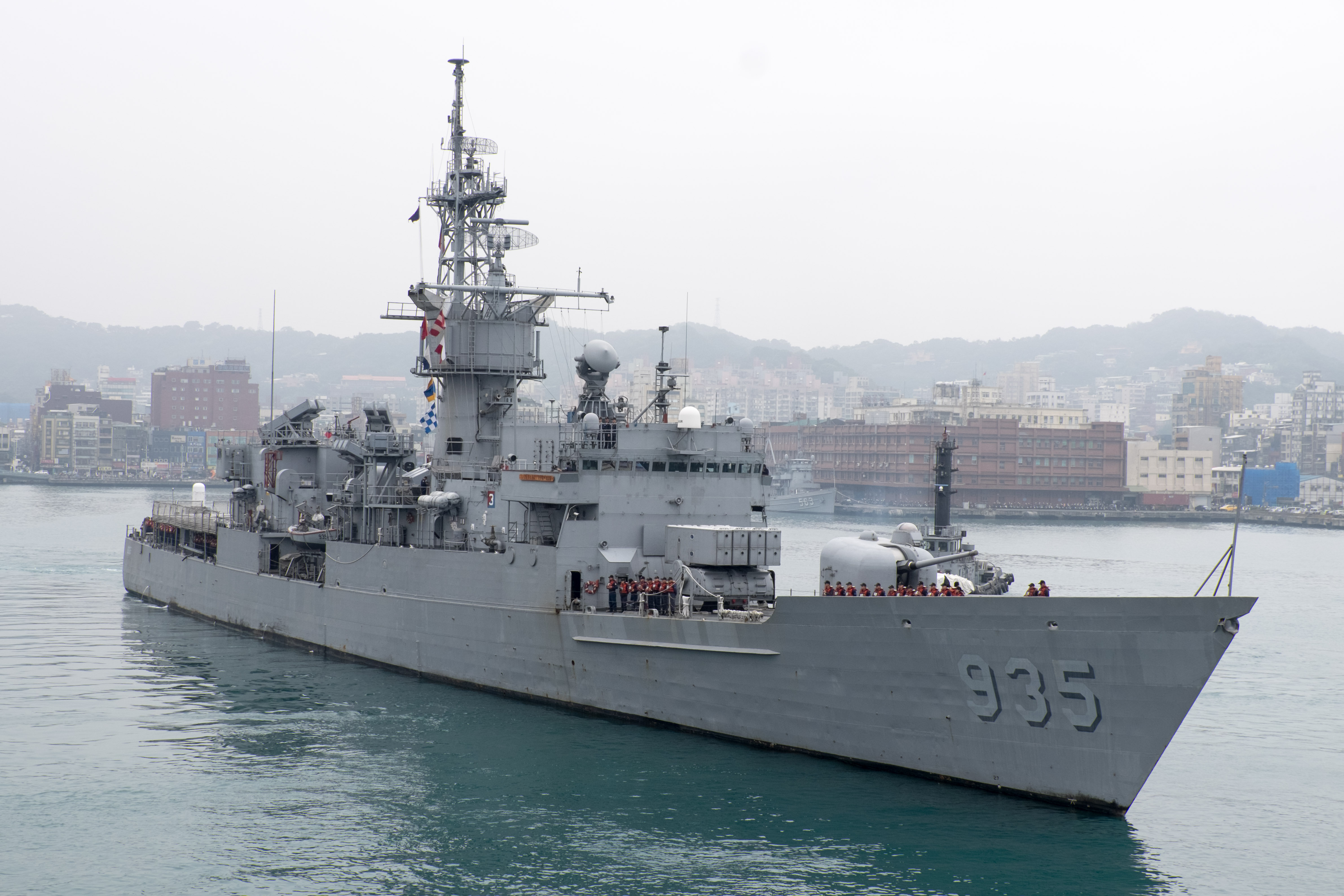
ROCS Lan Yang (FFG-935) Leaving Keelung Harbor

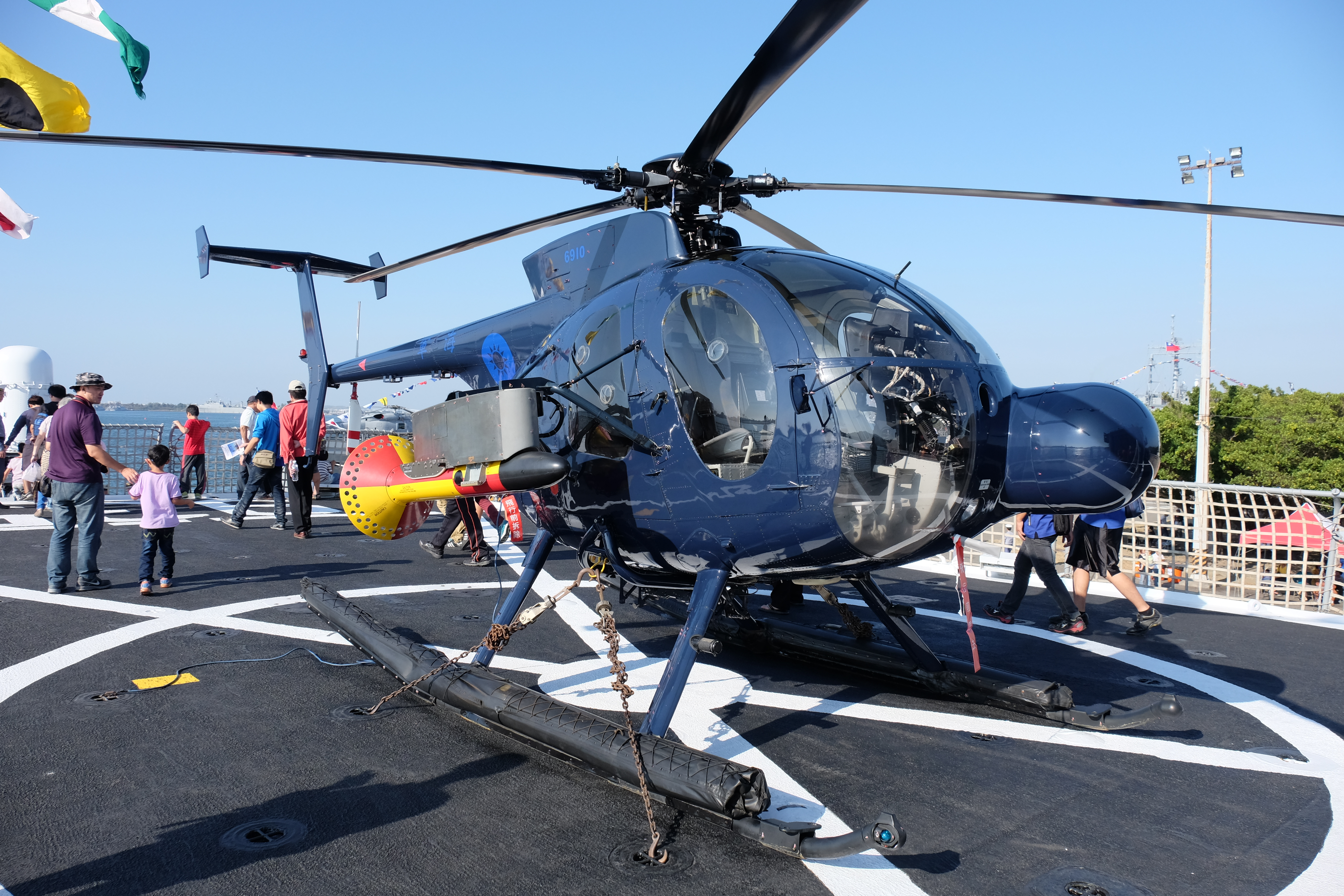
ROCN Hughes 500 6910 Carried on Lan Yang (FFG-935) Helicopter Deck

The ship was decommissioned 30 June 1994 and struck 11 January 1995. She was disposed of through the Security Assistance Program (SAP), transferred, cash sale, ex-US fleet hull foreign military sale, transferred to as Republic of China as Lan Yang (FF-935).

In 2006, Lan Yang completed the Wujin III Combat System project modification.

During Typhoon Nissa in 2017, the Hwai Yang Frigate and the Lan Yang, which were anchored in Keelung Port, were protected from damage by wind and waves with the assistance of the Republic of China Navy and Coast Guard officers and soldiers. However, the civilian ferry Lina, anchored behind the two ships, unexpectedly broke her rope due to strong winds and waves, drifted forward and collided with Hwai Yang and Lan Yang, damaging the stern of the two ships, breaking the railing of the helicopter pad and the stern radar detection line. After inspection and evaluation by the Republic of China Navy and Taiwan Shipbuilding Corporation, it will take at least two months to complete the repair, and the repair cost is about NT$1 million. The Republic of China Navy decided to claim compensation from the ferry company in accordance with the instructions of the Ministry of National Defense.

At about 16:00 on March 1, 2019, a fire broke out during the overhaul outsourcing project at the Su'ao Shipyard dry dock. The Yilan County Government Fire Department was subsequently notified and dispatched 6 vehicles and 42 people from the Marseille and Su'ao detachments to extinguish the fire. When they arrived, the fire had been extinguished and only bursts of white smoke remained. After treatment, it was no longer a problem. The fire was extinguished at 18:05. ; The Republic of China Navy issued a press release that evening stating that at 4:25 p.m., the temperature of the Lan Yang ship was too high during the welding of the ship bottom by the outsourced manufacturer, causing a lot of smoke in the furnace control room; the ship's safety duty personnel immediately reported it after discovering it, and the ship immediately launched firefighting and damage control. By 4:50 p.m., it was fully under control. After inspection, the personnel and main equipment were normal, and some auxiliary equipment could be repaired during the overhaul.

On January 3, 2025, a near-shore cruise was carried out in the waters of Kaohsiung. This was the last time the boiler was started for a cruise. After this cruise, she sailed into the Kaohsiung Xinbin Wharf to prepare for the decommissioning ceremony. Due to the age of the ship, an overall assessment shows that the combat capability of the entire ship no longer meets the current combat requirements. This ship was finally decommissioned on January 23, 2025.

On September 18, 2026, the decommissioned ROC Navy frigate Lan Yang (FFG-935) was sunk as a target vessel during a SINKEX exercise.

== Awards ==
- Combat Action Ribbon
- Joint Meritorious Unit Award with oak leaf cluster
- Meritorious Unit Citation
- Navy E Ribbon (3 awards)
- Navy Expeditionary Medal
- National Defense Service Medal with bronze star
- Armed Forces Expeditionary Medal with two bronze stars
- Vietnam Service Medal with one campaign star
- Sea Service Deployment Ribbon
- Republic of Vietnam Campaign Medal

== See also ==
- USS Trippe (FF-1075)
- USS Kirk
- USS Brewton
