= John Cushing Aylwin =

- Born: ca. 1780s Quebec, Province of Canada
- Died: January 28, 1813
- Military career
- Branch: United States Navy
- Rank: lieutenant

John Cushing Aylwin (1780s – January 28, 1813) was an officer in the United States Navy during the War of 1812.

== Early life ==
Born in Quebec, Canada, Aylwin worked on board British naval vessels at an early age. Though never formally enrolled in the Royal Navy, he received increasing responsibilities eventually performing the duties of a mate by 1795. He refused the offer of a midshipman's warrant, but continued service at sea—apparently against his will—for another six years. Ill health, however, finally brought about his return home.

== Later career ==
Then, for several years, he commanded merchant ships out of Boston, Massachusetts. When war between the United States and Great Britain broke out in 1812, Aylwin received an appointment as a lieutenant in the United States Navy and became sailing master on Constitution. He received commendations for his gallantry during that frigate's engagement with Guerriere on 19 August 1812. In which he refused medical attention until everyone else on the ship had received it.

Aylwin took part in the battle between Constitution and HMS Java on 29 December 1812. Severely wounded during that encounter, Aylwin later died at sea.

== Namesakes ==
Four ships in the United States Navy have been named USS Aylwin for him.
