= USS Stein =

Knox-class frigate of the US and Mexican navies

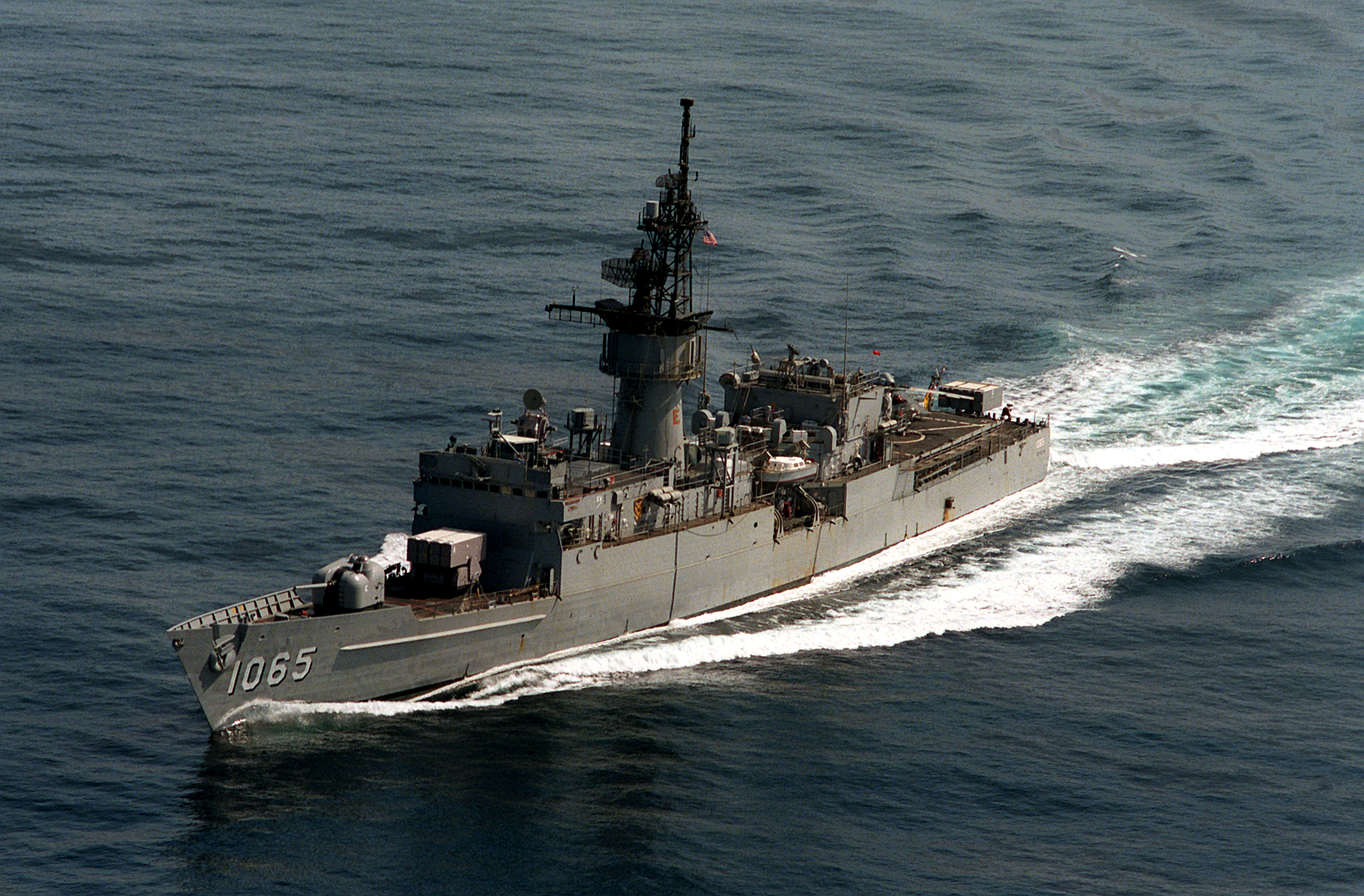
- USS Stein underway, March 1987

History

United States
- Name: USS Stein
- Namesake: Tony Stein
- Ordered: 22 July 1964
- Builder: Lockheed Shipbuilding and Construction Company, Seattle, Washington
- Laid down: 1 June 1970
- Launched: 19 December 1970
- Acquired: 30 December 1971
- Commissioned: 8 January 1972
- Decommissioned: 19 March 1992
- Stricken: 11 January 1995
- Identification: FF-1065
- Motto: Indomitable
- Fate: Sold to Mexico
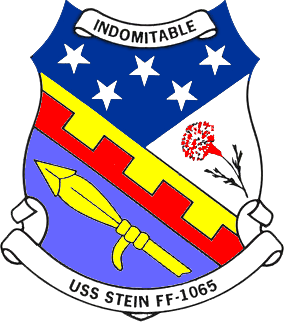
- Badge

Mexico
- Name: Ignacio Allende
- Namesake: Ignacio Allende
- Acquired: August 1997
- Commissioned: 1997
- Decommissioned: 2016
- Identification: E50; F-211

General characteristics
- Class & type: Knox-class frigate
- Displacement: 3,226 tons (4,207 full load)
- Length: 438 ft (134 m)
- Beam: 46 ft 9 in (14.25 m)
- Draft: 24 ft 9 in (7.54 m)
- Propulsion: 2 × CE 1200psi boilers; 1 × Westinghouse geared turbine set; 1 × shaft, 35,000 shp (26,099 kW)
- Speed: Over 27 knots (50 km/h)
- Range: 4,500 nautical miles (8,330 km) at 20 knots (37 km/h)
- Complement: 18 officers, 267 enlisted
- Sensors & processing systems: AN/SPS-40 Air Search Radar; AN/SPS-67 Surface Search Radar; AN/SQS-26 Sonar; AN/SQR-18 Towed array sonar system; Mk68 Gun Fire Control System
- Electronic warfare & decoys: AN/SLQ-32 Electronics Warfare System
- Armament: 1 × Mk-16 8-cell missile launcher for ASROC and Harpoon missiles; 1 × Mk-42 5-inch/54 caliber gun; 4 × single-tube Mark 46 torpedo launcher; 1 × Mk-25 BPDMS launcher for Sea Sparrow missiles
- Aircraft carried: 1 × SH-2 Seasprite (LAMPS I) helicopter

USS Stein (DE-1065) was a Knox-class destroyer escort, later redesignated as a frigate (FF-1065) of the United States Navy. She was named after Tony Stein, the first Marine (of 22) to receive the Medal of Honor for action in the Battle of Iwo Jima.

Stein was laid down on 1 June 1970 at Seattle, Washington, by Lockheed Shipbuilding & Construction Co.; launched on 19 December 1970; sponsored by Mrs. Rose S. Parks; and commissioned on 8 January 1972.

Stein was decommissioned on 19 March 1992 and struck from the Naval Vessel Register on 11 January 1995. She was subsequently transferred to the Mexican Navy and renamed the Armada República Mexicana Ignacio Allende, abbreviated ARM Allende.

== Design and description ==
The Knox-class was an enlarged derivative of the Brooke-class frigate, omitting the Brooke's expensive Tartar medium range surface to air missiles and the high pressure boilers used by the Brooke and Garcia-class frigate frigates.

The ship was 438 ft (133.5 m) long overall and 415 ft (126.5 m) between perpendiculars, with a beam of 47 ft (14.3 m) and a draft of 25 ft (7.6 m). Displacement was 3,020 long tons (3,068 t) light and 4,066 long tons (4,131 t) full load. Two Babcock & Wilcox boilers supplied steam at 1,200 psi (8,300 kPa) and 950 °F (510 °C) to a Westinghouse steam turbine which drove a single 15 ft (4.6 m) diameter five-bladed propeller. The machinery was rated at 35,000 shp (26,000 kW), giving a design speed of 27 kn (31 mph; 50 km/h).

As built, Stein was equipped with one 5-in/54 caliber Mark 42 gun forward, an eight-round ASROC launcher (with 16 missiles carried) abaft the gun and forward of the bridge, with four fixed 12.75 in (324 mm) Mark 32 anti-submarine torpedo tubes. A helicopter deck and hangar for operating the DASH drone helicopter was fitted aft. The ship's main anti-submarine sensor was the large bow-mounted AN/SQS-26CX low-frequency scanning sonar, while AN/SPS-40 air-search radar and AN/SPS-10 surface search radar was fitted. A Mark 68 Fire Control System, with associated AN/SPG-53 radar controlled the ship's gun.

During the 1970s, Stein was refitted with an eight-cell BPDMS Sea Sparrow surface to air missile launcher aft, while the ship's flight deck and hangar were enlarged to allow a single manned, Kaman SH-2D/F Seasprite LAMPS 1 helicopter to be carried. The ship's sonar suite was enhanced by the addition of an AN/SQS-35 variable depth sonar. By 1985, Stein was fitted with an AN/SQR-18A TACTASS passive towed array sonar, which was towed using the SQS-35 hoist, and by 1990 a 20 mm (0.79 in) Phalanx CIWS replaced the Sea Sparrow launcher.

In Mexican service, the Phalanx CIWS was removed and the Sea Sparrow launcher restored.

== History ==
Stein, named for Medal of Honor recipient Tony Stein, was one of 16 Knox-class Destroyer Escorts ordered under the US Navy's fiscal year 1965 construction program, with the order being placed on 22 July 1964.

=== U.S. Service ===
The ship was laid down at Lockheed Shipbuilding and Construction Company's Seattle shipyard on 1 June 1970 and was launched on 19 December 1970. She was commissioned on 8 January 1972, being assigned the Hull number DE 1065.

The ocean escort spent another eight weeks at the Puget Sound Naval Shipyard and completed fitting-out. She conducted trials, then got underway in early March and arrived at her home port, San Diego, on 17 March. Two weeks later, she headed south along the coast of Mexico and South America on her shakedown cruise. Stein returned to San Diego in May and, late the following month, commenced post-shakedown repairs and modifications at Long Beach Naval Shipyard. On 8 December, she completed yard work and began intensive preparations for her first deployment to the western Pacific.

She departed San Diego Bay in mid-April 1973 and stopped at Midway and Guam, before entering Subic Bay in the Philippines on 19 May 1973. She operated with the 7th Fleet until the end of August, when she cleared the area for a visit to Australia and New Zealand before returning to the west coast. Stein called at Manus Island; Townsville, Australia; and Auckland, New Zealand, in September and returned to Australia, at Sydney, in October. On her way back to the United States, the escort ship stopped off at Suva, Pago Pago, and Pearl Harbor before reaching San Diego on 1 November.

The escort remained in port there until June 1974, when she got underway for a series of special operations. Stein then operated out of San Diego until mid-August. After a short period in port, she departed again on another special operation. This one, however, ended at Cubi Point on Subic Bay in the Philippines and began her second tour of duty with the 7th Fleet. The warship worked out of Subic Bay until late October when she sailed on a voyage that carried her to Singapore, and thence into the Indian Ocean. In November, she visited Karachi and returned to Singapore, where she was in December 1974.

==== Reclassification ====
Stein was reclassified as a frigate on 30 June 1975, with the hull number FF 1065.

==== Unknown animal incident ====
She is noteworthy as a U.S. Navy vessel that has apparently been attacked by an unknown species. In 1978, the "NOFOUL" rubber coating of her AN/SQS-26 sonar dome was damaged by multiple cuts over eight percent of the dome surface. Nearly all of the cuts contained remnants of sharp, curved teeth. The teeth were much larger than those of any squid that had been discovered at that time and does not match any other known species.

==== Decommissioning ====
In late August 1991, Stein was ordered to prepare to be decommissioned. She got underway to Indian Island, Washington for ammunition off load and a port visit at Victoria, Canada. Upon returning to San Diego, she started preparation for preservation and was decommissioned on 19 March 1992. She was towed to Bremerton, Washington, added to the United States Navy Reserve Fleet and stayed there until mid-1997.

=== Mexican service ===
The ship was transferred to the Mexican Navy by sale on 29 January 1997 along with sister ship Marvin Shields, and was renamed Ignacio Allende, with the pennant number E50. The two frigates arrived in Mexico on 16 August 1997 and entered service on 23 November 1998. The ship changed pennant number, to F211, in 2001.

== Cruises ==
- 1987 World Cruise
