= USS Moinester =

Knox-class frigate (1973)

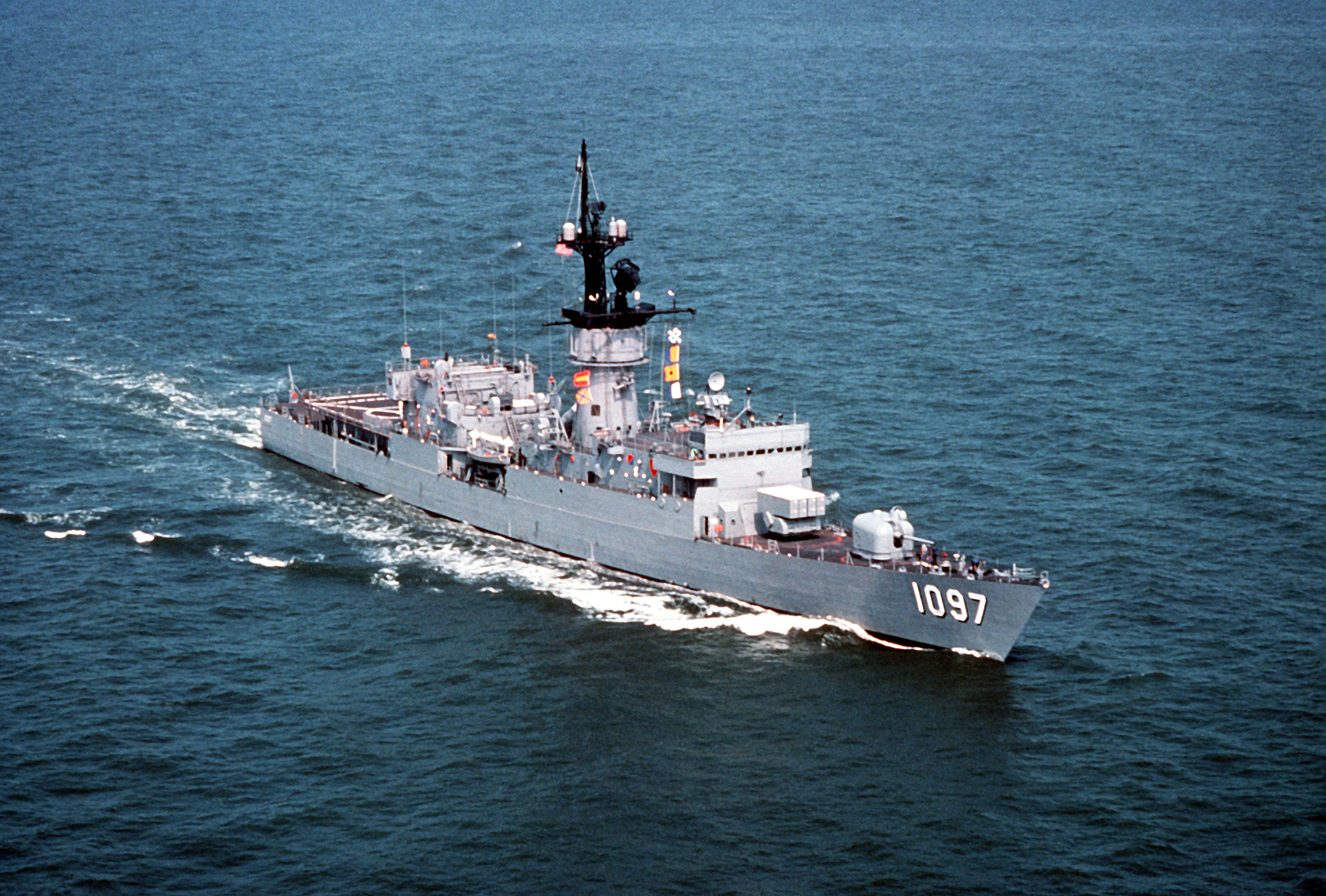
- USS Moinester (FF-1097)

History

United States
- Name: Moinester
- Namesake: LTJG Robert William Moinester
- Ordered: 25 August 1966
- Builder: Avondale Shipyard, Westwego, Louisiana
- Yard number: 1165
- Laid down: 25 August 1972
- Launched: 12 May 1973
- Sponsored by: Mrs. Gertrude Mahoney Moinester, mother of namesake
- Acquired: 17 October 1974
- Commissioned: 2 November 1974
- Decommissioned: 28 July 1994
- Identification: FF-1097
- Motto: Mare est vita Mea; The Sea is My Life
- Fate: Transferred to Egypt, 28 June 1994
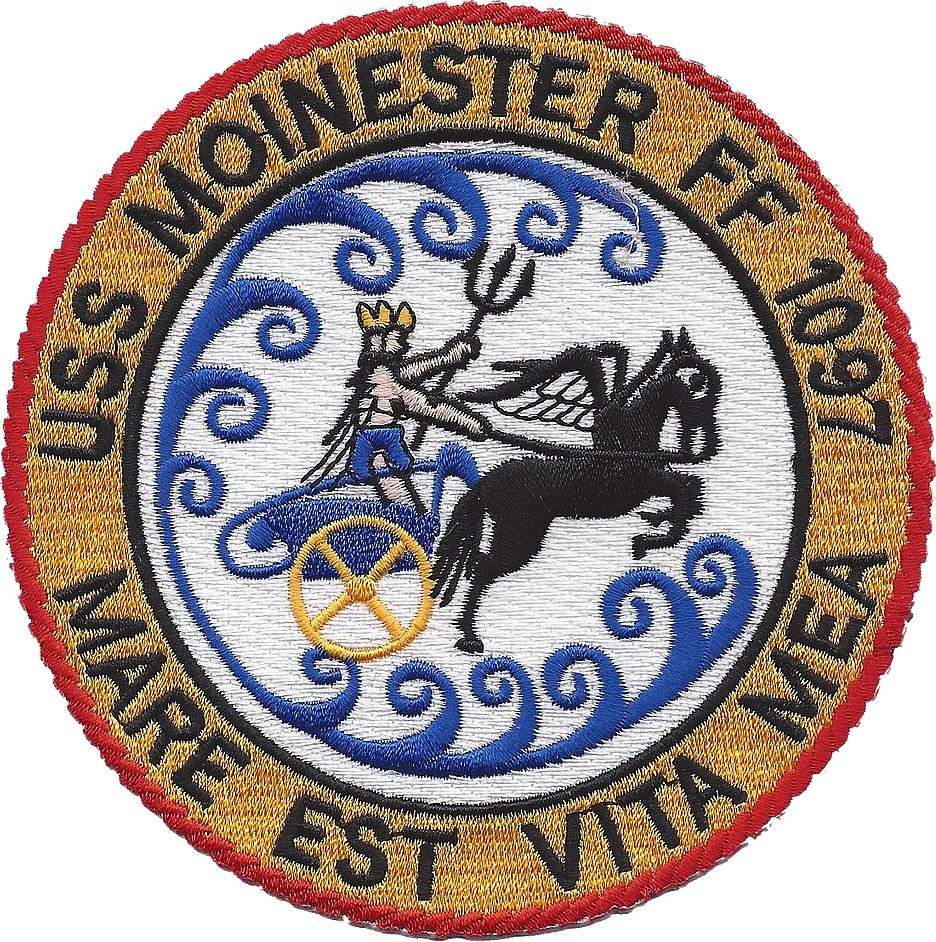
- Badge

Egypt
- Name: Rasheed
- Leased: 28 June 1994
- Purchased: 25 March 1998
- Identification: F966
- Status: in active service, as of 2017

General characteristics
- Class & type: Knox-class frigate
- Displacement: 3,011 tons (3,877 full load)
- Length: 438 ft (134 m)
- Beam: 46 ft 9 in (14.25 m)
- Draft: 24 ft 9 in (7.54 m)
- Propulsion: 2 × CE 1200psi boilers; 1 Westinghouse geared turbine; 1 shaft, 35,000 shp (26,000 kW)
- Speed: over 27 knots (50 km/h; 31 mph)
- Complement: 18 officers, 267 enlisted
- Sensors & processing systems: AN/SPS-40 Air Search Radar; AN/SPS-67 Surface Search Radar; AN/SQS-26 Sonar; AN/SQR-18 Towed array sonar system; Mk68 Gun Fire Control System
- Electronic warfare & decoys: AN/SLQ-32 Electronics Warfare System
- Armament: 1 × Mk-16 8 cell missile launcher for RUR-5 ASROC and Harpoon missiles; 1 × Mk-42 5-inch/54 caliber gun; 4 × torpedo tubes for Mark 46 torpedoes
- Aircraft carried: one SH-2 Seasprite (LAMPS I) helicopter

USS Moinester (FF-1097) was a Knox-class frigate. The ship was named for LTJG Robert W. Moinester who was killed in action during the Battle of Huế on 31 January 1968 and was posthumously awarded the Silver Star. Moinester was christened by Mrs. Gertrude Mahoney Moinester, the mother of the ship's namesake and ship sponsor.

== Design and description ==
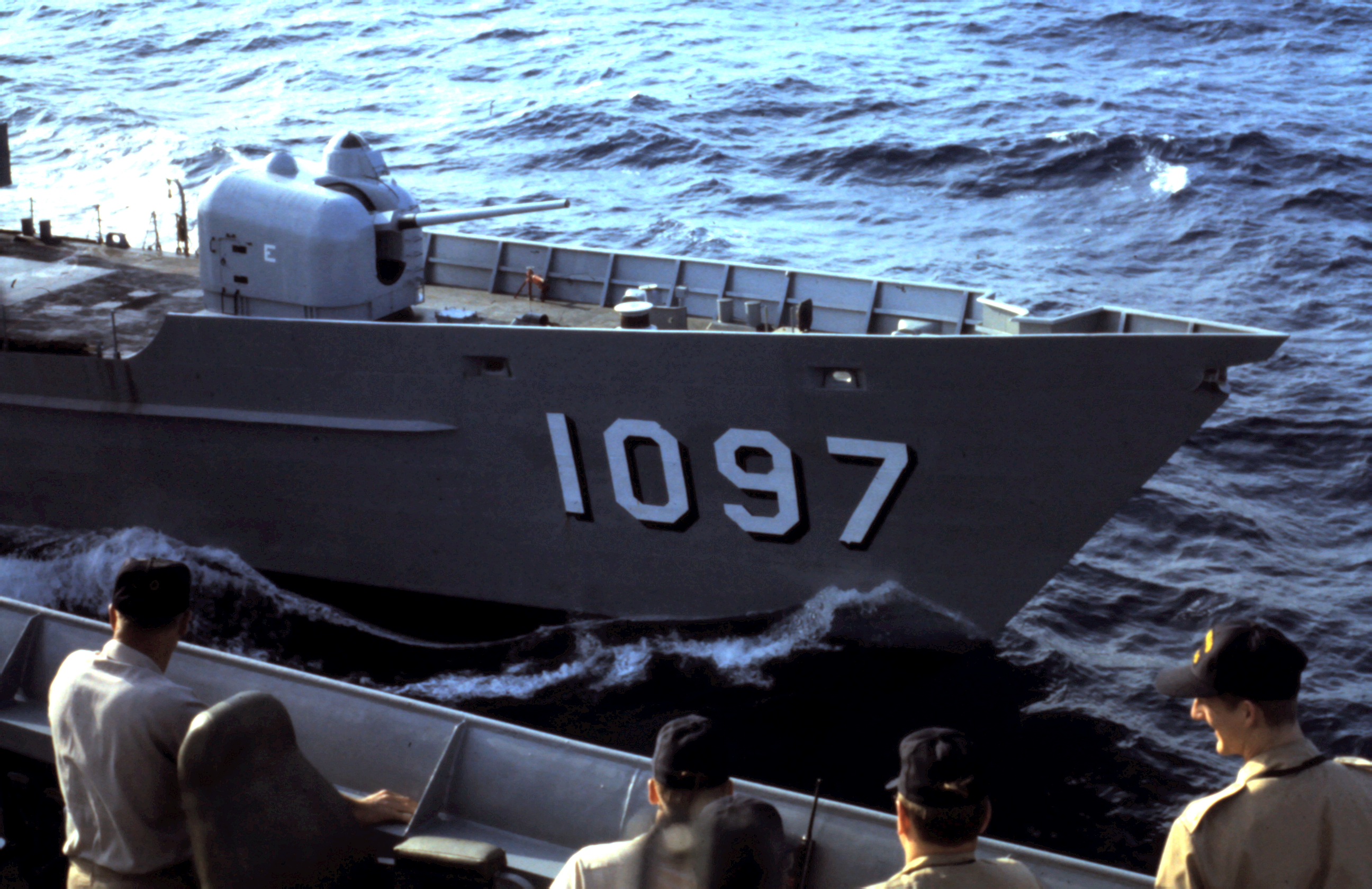
USS Moinster (FF-1097) alongside USS Concord (AFS-5) in the Med 1983

The Knox-class design was derived from the Brooke-class frigate modified to extend range and without a long-range missile system. The ships had an overall length of 438 feet (133.5 m), a beam of 47 feet (14.3 m) and a draft of 25 feet (7.6 m). They displaced 4,066 long tons (4,131 t) at full load. Their crew consisted of 13 officers and 211 enlisted men.

The ships were equipped with one Westinghouse geared steam turbine that drove the single propeller shaft. The turbine was designed to produce 35,000 shaft horsepower (26,000 kW), using steam provided by 2 C-E boilers, to reach the designed speed of 27 knots (50 km/h; 31 mph). The Knox class had a range of 4,500 nautical miles (8,300 km; 5,200 mi) at a speed of 20 knots (37 km/h; 23 mph).

The Knox-class ships were armed with a 5"/54 caliber Mark 42 gun forward and a single 3-inch/50-caliber gun aft. They mounted an eight-round RUR-5 ASROC launcher between the 5-inch (127 mm) gun and the bridge. Close-range anti-submarine defense was provided by two twin 12.75-inch (324 mm) Mk 32 torpedo tubes. The ships were equipped with a torpedo-carrying DASH drone helicopter; its telescoping hangar and landing pad were positioned amidships aft of the MACK. Beginning in the 1970s, the DASH was replaced by a SH-2 Seasprite LAMPS I helicopter and the hangar and landing deck were accordingly enlarged. Most ships also had the 3-inch (76 mm) gun replaced by an eight-cell BPDMS missile launcher in the early 1970s.

== Construction and career ==
Moinester was decommissioned and sold to the Egyptian Navy and became the Egyptian frigate Rasheed (F966).

== Awards, citations and campaign ribbons ==
Joint Meritorious Unit Award
Navy Unit Commendation
Navy "E" Ribbon (4)
National Defense Service Medal
Armed Forces Expeditionary Medal
Humanitarian Service Ribbon
Sea Service Deployment Ribbon
Coast Guard Special Operations Service Ribbon
