= USS Robert E. Peary (FF-1073) =

1971 Knox-class frigate of the US Navy

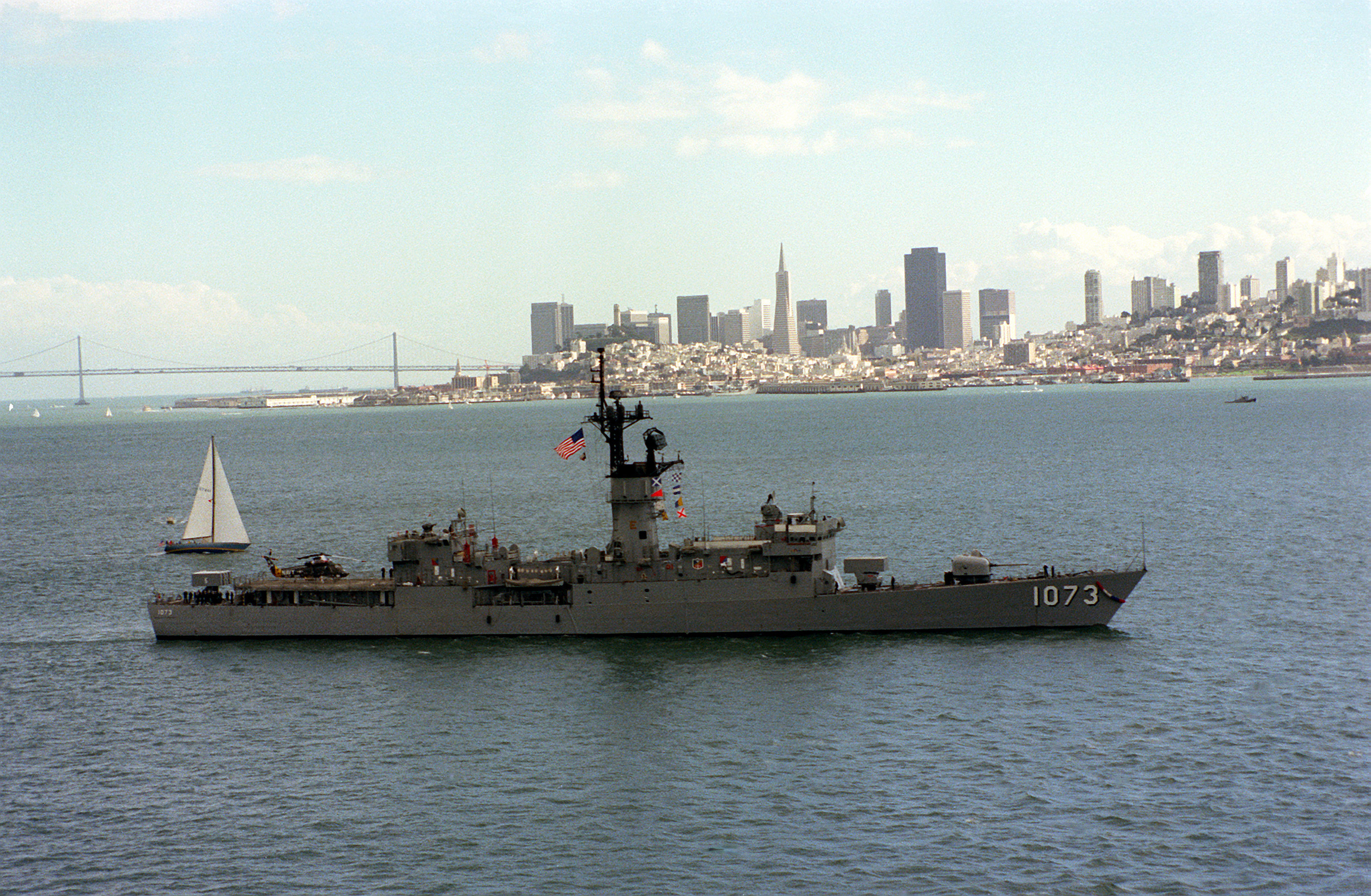
- USS Robert E. Peary (FF-1073)

History

United States
- Name: Robert E. Peary
- Namesake: Robert Peary
- Ordered: 22 July 1964
- Builder: Lockheed Shipbuilding and Construction Company, Seattle, Washington
- Laid down: 20 December 1970
- Launched: 23 June 1971
- Acquired: 11 August 1972
- Commissioned: 23 September 1972
- Decommissioned: 7 August 1992
- Stricken: 11 January 1995
- Identification: FF-1073
- Fate: Transferred to Republic of China, 7 August 1992
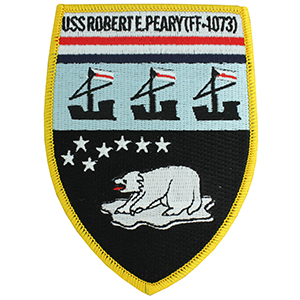
- Badge

Republic of China
- Name: Chi Yang
- Namesake: Jiyang
- Acquired: 7 August 1992
- Commissioned: 6 October 1993
- Decommissioned: 1 May 2015
- Identification: FF-932
- Fate: Sunk as target on 15 July 2020

General characteristics
- Class & type: Knox-class frigate
- Displacement: 4,066 long tons (4,131 t) (full load)
- Length: 438 ft (134 m)
- Beam: 47 ft (14 m)
- Draft: 25 ft (7.6 m)
- Propulsion: 2 × Babcock & Wilcox Modified "D" Super-heated 1200psi boilers; 1 Westinghouse geared turbine; 1 shaft, 35,000 shp (26,000 kW)
- Speed: over 27 knots (31 mph; 50 km/h)
- Range: 4,500 nautical miles (8,330 km) at 20 knots (23 mph; 37 km/h)
- Complement: 18 officers, 267 enlisted
- Sensors & processing systems: AN/SPS-40 Air Search Radar; AN/SPS-67 Surface Search Radar; AN/SQS-26 Sonar; AN/SQR-18 Towed array sonar system; AN/SQS-35 Towed Body Sonar; Mk68 Gun Fire Control System
- Electronic warfare & decoys: AN/SLQ-32 Electronics Warfare System
- Armament: one Mk-16 8 cell missile launcher for RUR-5 ASROC and Harpoon missiles; one Mk-42 5-inch/54 caliber gun; Mark 46 torpedoes from four single tube launchers); one Mk-25 BPDMS launcher for Sea Sparrow missiles, replaced by Phalanx CIWS
- Aircraft carried: one SH-2 Seasprite (LAMPS I) helicopter

USS Robert E. Peary (FF-1073) was a Knox-class frigate with the United States Navy from 1972 until 1992. In 1992, the ship was decommissioned and loaned to the Republic of China. The ship was renamed Chi Yang (Chinese: 濟陽) and was part of the Republic of China Navy until 2015.

== Construction ==
The third US Navy warship named for Robert E. Peary was laid down on 20 December 1970, by the Lockheed Ship Building and Drydock Company in Seattle, Washington; launched 26 June 1971; sponsored by Miss Josephine Peary; and commissioned 23 September 1972.

== Design and description ==
The Knox-class design was derived from the Brooke class modified to extend range and without a long-range missile system. The ships had an overall length of 438 feet (133.5 m), a beam of 47 feet (14.3 m) and a draft of 25 feet (7.6 m). They displaced 4,066 long tons (4,131 t) at full load. Their crew consisted of 13 officers and 211 enlisted men.

The ships were equipped with one Westinghouse geared steam turbine that drove the single propeller shaft. The turbine was designed to produce 35,000 shaft horsepower (26,000 kW), using steam provided by 2 Babcock & Wilcox Modified "D" Super-heated boilers, to reach the designed speed of 27 knots (50 km/h; 31 mph). The Knox class had a range of 4,500 nautical miles (8,300 km; 5,200 mi) at a speed of 20 knots (37 km/h; 23 mph).

The Knox-class ships were armed with a 5"/54 caliber Mark 42 gun forward and a single 3-inch/50-caliber gun aft. They mounted an eight-round RUR-5 ASROC launcher between the 5-inch (127 mm) gun and the bridge. Close-range anti-submarine defense was provided by two twin 12.75-inch (324 mm) Mk 32 torpedo tubes. The ships were equipped with a torpedo-carrying DASH drone helicopter; its telescoping hangar and landing pad were positioned amidships aft of the mack. Beginning in the 1970s, the DASH was replaced by a SH-2 Seasprite LAMPS I helicopter and the hangar and landing deck were accordingly enlarged. Most ships also had the 3-inch (76 mm) gun replaced by an eight-cell BPDMS missile launcher in the early 1970s.

== Service history ==
Following two months of miscellaneous tests and trials along the northern Pacific coast of the United States, she steamed into her home port at Long Beach, California, 8 November. Robert E. Peary remained in the Long Beach area for one year exactly, departing for WestPac 9 November 1973, and arriving in Subic Bay, Philippine Islands, ten days later.

Robert E. Peary was decommissioned on 7 August 1992, and loaned to the Republic of China. The frigate was renamed Chi Yang by the Republic of China Navy and served with the identification number FF-932. The vessel was commissioned into the Republic of China Navy on 6 October 1993. On 11 November 1995, the ship was officially struck from the United States navy list. The frigate continued service until 2015, when on 1 May, Chi Yang and her sister, Hai Ying, were decommissioned at Kaohsiung. The two ships will be cannibalized for parts to keep the remaining six Knox-class vessels of the Republic of China Navy in service. ex-Chi Yang was sunk as a target 15 July 2020 off the south-east coast of Taiwan at 22°21′43.0″N 121°13′09.0″E.

== Awards ==
- Top Row: Navy Battle "E" Ribbon (2) - Navy Expeditionary Medal - National Defense Service Medal w/ 1 star
- Second Row: Armed Forces Expeditionary Medal - Southwest Asia Service Medal w/ 1 star - Humanitarian Service Ribbon
- third Row: Sea Service Deployment Ribbon - Kuwait Liberation Medal (Saudi Arabia) - Kuwait Liberation Medal (Kuwait)

== Gallery ==
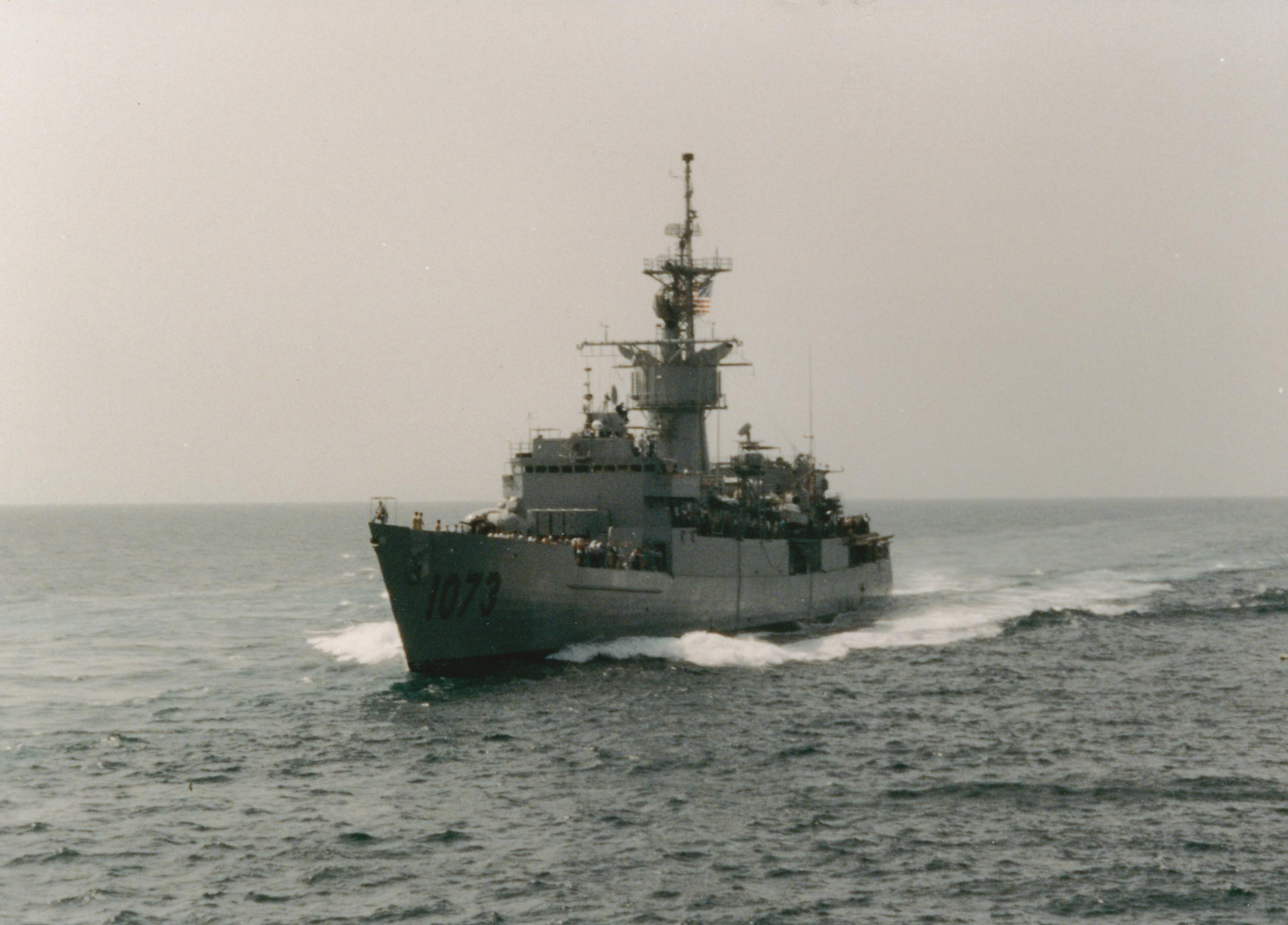
USS Robert E. Peary as seen from the starboard side of USS Truxtun circa 1991 in the Persian Gulf in support of Operation Desert Storm

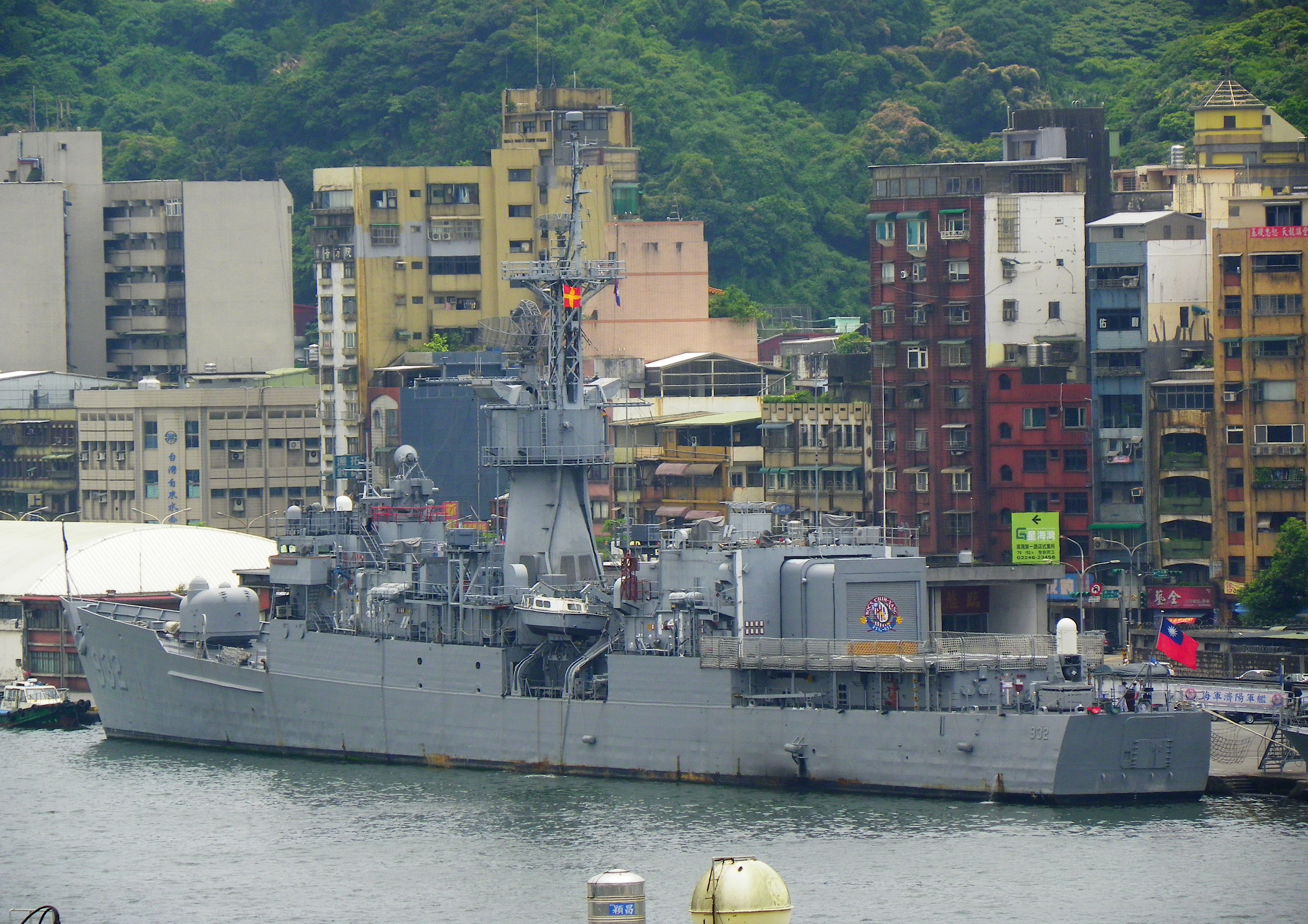
USS Robert E. Peary as ROCS Chi Yang (FF-932) in Keelung, Taiwan, 2012
