= USS Thomas C. Hart =

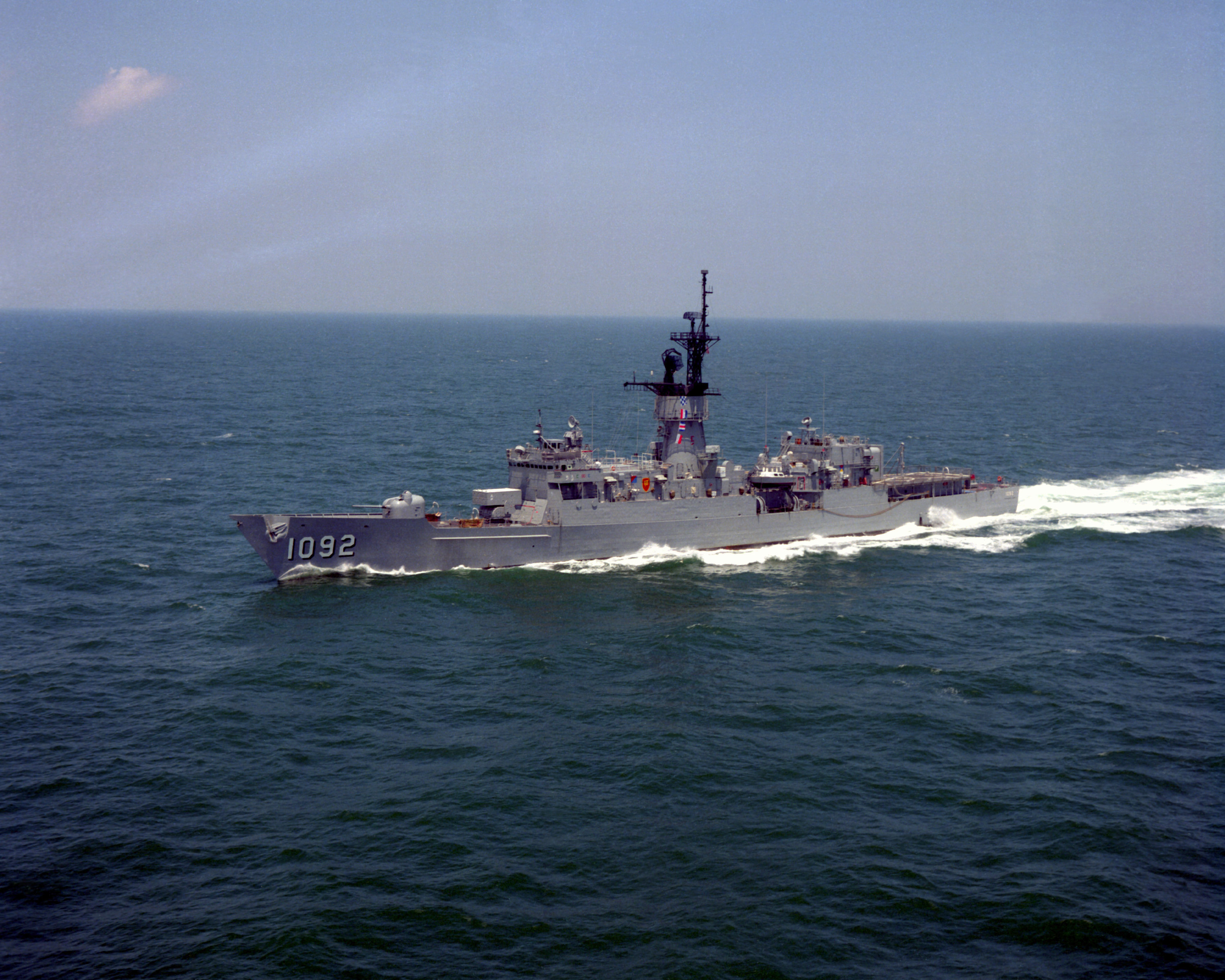
- USS Thomas C. Hart, 21 February 1985

History

United States
- Ordered: 25 August 1966
- Builder: Avondale Shipyard, Westwego, Louisiana
- Laid down: 8 October 1971
- Launched: 12 August 1972
- Acquired: 8 June 1973
- Commissioned: 28 July 1973
- Decommissioned: 30 August 1993
- Stricken: 11 January 1995
- Fate: Disposed of through the Security Assistance Program (SAP), transferred to Turkey 30 August 1993

Turkey
- Name: TCG Zafer (F253)
- Acquired: 30 August 1993
- Stricken: 14 June 2016
- Fate: Used as a target in exercise

General characteristics
- Class & type: Knox-class frigate
- Displacement: 3,201 tons (4,182 tons full load)
- Length: 438 ft (134 m)
- Beam: 46 ft 9 in (14.25 m)
- Draft: 24 ft 9 in (7.54 m)
- Propulsion: 2 × Combustion Engineering 1200psi boilers; 1 Westinghouse geared steam turbine; 1 shaft, 35,000 SHP (26 MW)
- Speed: over 27 knots
- Complement: 18 officers, 267 enlisted
- Sensors & processing systems: AN/SPS-40 Air Search Radar; AN/SPS-67 Surface Search Radar; AN/SQS-26 Sonar; AN/SQR-18 Towed array sonar system; Mk68 Gun Fire Control System
- Electronic warfare & decoys: AN/SLQ-32 Electronics Warfare System
- Armament: one Mk-16 8 cell missile launcher for ASROC and Harpoon missiles; one Mk-42 5-inch/54 caliber gun; Mark 46 torpedoes from four single tube launchers)
- Aircraft carried: one SH-2 Seasprite (LAMPS I) helicopter

USS Thomas C. Hart (FF-1092) was a Knox-class frigate, named for Admiral and Senator Thomas C. Hart. Thomas C. Hart (DE-1092) was laid down on 8 October 1971 at Westwego, La., by Avondale Shipyards, Inc.; launched on 12 August 1972; sponsored by Mrs. Reginald Bragonier, eldest granddaughter of Admiral Thomas C. Hart; and commissioned on 28 July 1973.

== Initial cruises ==
The last combatant ship commissioned at the Boston Naval Shipyard, Thomas C. Hart conducted sea trials off the east coast before being homeported in Norfolk, Va. Following shakedown at Guantanamo Bay, Cuba, she returned to the Norfolk Naval Shipyard on 1 February 1974, where she underwent a major structural conversion, altering her after superstructure to accommodate the new Light Airborne Multi-purpose System (LAMPS) facilities. She then steamed out for post-repair trials off the Virginia Capes.

Deploying to the Caribbean, Thomas C. Hart conducted weapons systems tests and antisubmarine exercises and, upon completion of these duties, called at Port-au-Prince, Haiti, before returning to Guantanamo Bay for further training. After naval gunfire support qualification at Roosevelt Roads, she cruised to Bermuda for a three-day visit. She left Port Royal Bay on 3 September, having to do a "quick step" to avoid the tropical storm which later became Hurricane Delores, and arrived at Norfolk on 5 September.

In October, following type training in the Narragansett Bay area, the ship qualified for a certificate for unrestricted operations.

With Capt. W. R. Smedburg IV, Commander, Destroyer Squadron 10, and his staff embarked, Thomas C. Hart got underway on 18 November for Composite Task Unit Exercise 4-75 and nine days of intensive exercises. The following month, the ship passed her Nuclear Weapons Acceptance Inspection on 11 December and thus became a nuclear-qualified ship.

== Deployment ==
The early months of 1975 were spent in preparation for Thomas C. Hart's first Mediterranean deployment. This deployment, which lasted from 16 June to 22 December, consisted primarily of operations with USS John F. Kennedy and other escorts while making a number of port visits in company with Pharris. On 1 July 1975, the ship was reclassified as FF-1092. Thomas C. Hart spent the first six months of 1976 engaging in two major fleet exercises in preparation for her four and one-half-month, unsupported participation in Unitas XVII later in the year. The first exercise, "Safepass," lasted from 6 to 26 March and involved complex NATO fleet operations out of Halifax, Nova Scotia. The second exercise, "Solid Shield," occurred during the period 13 to 18 May and involved operations off the coast of the Carolinas in support of a full amphibious landing on Onslow Beach. Following an intensive month-long preparation period in June, Thomas C. Hart commenced Unitas XVII on 9 July. During the next 18 weeks, the ship circumnavigated the South American continent and operated with host ships from Brazil, Uruguay, Argentina, Chile, Peru, Colombia, and Venezuela. The frigate returned to her home port of Norfolk on 21 November and spent the remainder of the year in post-deployment stand down and holiday leave period.

Early 1977 found Thomas C. Hart experiencing a period of maintenance, alteration, and testing. Of most significance was the installation of the Harpoon system, a highly sophisticated surface warfare missile which greatly extended Thomas C. Hart's reach against surface contacts. Most of September was spent in Norfolk preparing for the ship's second Mediterranean deployment. She departed CONUS on 27 September and engaged in seven months of operations with the 6th Fleet before returning to Norfolk again on 26 April 1978. Ports of call included Rota, Spain; Alexandria, Egypt; Istanbul, Turkey; Piraeus, Greece; Venice, Gaeta, and Naples, Italy; and—finally—Majorca; Valencia, and Rota, Spain.

Following post-deployment stand down, Thomas C. Hart engaged in CORTRAMID 78, an underway training period for midshipmen, which lasted from mid-June through early July. In late September 1978, Thomas C. Hart's home port was shifted to Philadelphia in anticipation of the commencement of her first regular overhaul since commissioning. Thomas C. Hart entered the Philadelphia Naval Shipyard for this purpose on 26 October, and she remained there into 1979.

On 30 August 1993 the ship was transferred to Turkey as TCG Zafer (F253). Decommissioned, the ship was sunk as a target ship as part of Turkish Navy exercise Beyaz Fırtına 2016.

== See also ==
Media related to USS Thomas C. Hart (FF-1092) at Wikimedia Commons
Media related to TCG Zafer (F-253) at Wikimedia Commons
