= USS Donald B. Beary =

United States Navy frigate

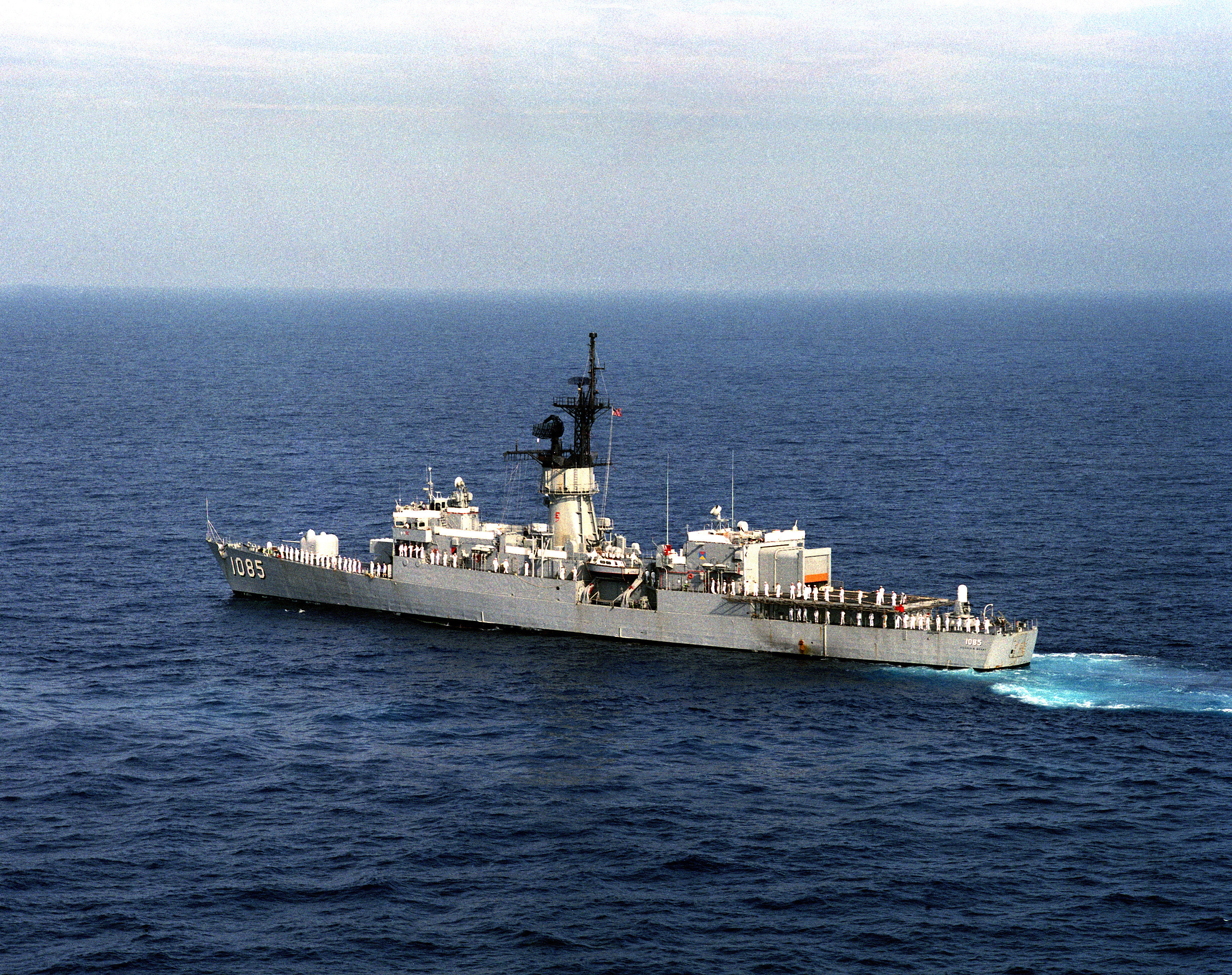
- USS Donald B. Beary (FF-1085)

History

United States
- Name: Donald B. Beary
- Namesake: Vice Admiral Donald B. Beary
- Ordered: 25 August 1966
- Builder: Avondale Shipyard, Westwego, Louisiana
- Laid down: 24 July 1970
- Launched: 22 May 1971
- Commissioned: 22 July 1972
- Decommissioned: 20 May 1994
- Stricken: 11 January 1995
- Identification: FF-1085 (ex-DE-1085)
- Motto: Prudentia-Animus-Fortitdo; Knowledge-Spirit-Valor
- Fate: Disposed of through the Security Assistance Program (SAP), transferred, Foreign Assistance Act (FAA) Section 516, Southern Region Amendment, to Turkey 2 February 2002

Turkey
- Name: Karadeniz
- Commissioned: 20 May 1994
- Decommissioned: 2006
- Identification: F-255
- Fate: Scrapped

General characteristics
- Class & type: Knox-class frigate
- Displacement: 3,195 tons (4,176 full load)
- Length: 438 ft (134 m)
- Beam: 46 ft 9 in (14.25 m)
- Draft: 24 ft 9 in (7.54 m)
- Propulsion: 2 × CE 1200psi boilers; 1 Westinghouse geared turbine; 1 shaft, 35,000 SHP (26 MW)
- Speed: over 27 knots
- Complement: 18 officers, 267 enlisted
- Sensors & processing systems: AN/SPS-40 Air Search Radar; AN/SPS-67 Surface Search Radar; AN/SQS-26 Sonar; AN/SQR-18 Towed array sonar system; Mk68 Gun Fire Control System
- Electronic warfare & decoys: AN/SLQ-32 Electronics Warfare System
- Armament: one Mk-16 8 cell missile launcher for RUR-5 ASROC and Harpoon missiles; one Mk-42 5-inch/54 caliber gun; Mark 46 torpedoes from four single tube launchers); one Phalanx CIWS
- Aircraft carried: one SH-2 Seasprite (LAMPS I) helicopter

USS Donald B. Beary (FF-1085) was a Knox-class frigate built for the United States Navy.

== Design and description ==
The Knox class design was derived from the Brooke-class frigate modified to extend range and without a long-range missile system. The ships had an overall length of 438 feet (133.5 m), a beam of 47 feet (14.3 m) and a draft of 25 feet (7.6 m). They displaced 4,066 long tons (4,131 t) at full load. Their crew consisted of 13 officers and 211 enlisted men.

The ships were equipped with one Westinghouse geared steam turbine that drove the single propeller shaft. The turbine was designed to produce 35,000 shaft horsepower (26,000 kW), using steam provided by 2 C-E boilers, to reach the designed speed of 27 knots (50 km/h; 31 mph). The Knox class had a range of 4,500 nautical miles (8,300 km; 5,200 mi) at a speed of 20 knots (37 km/h; 23 mph).

The Knox-class ships were armed with a 5"/54 caliber Mark 42 gun forward and a single 3-inch/50-caliber gun aft. They mounted an eight-round ASROC launcher between the 5-inch (127 mm) gun and the bridge. Close-range anti-submarine defense was provided by two twin 12.75-inch (324 mm) Mk 32 torpedo tubes. The ships were equipped with a torpedo-carrying DASH drone helicopter; its telescoping hangar and landing pad were positioned amidships aft of the mack. Beginning in the 1970s, the DASH was replaced by a SH-2 Seasprite LAMPS I helicopter and the hangar and landing deck were accordingly enlarged. Most ships also had the 3-inch (76 mm) gun replaced by an eight-cell BPDMS missile launcher in the early 1970s.

== Construction and career ==
The ship was leased to Turkey in 1994 and subsequently sold to them, as the Tepe-class frigate TCG Karadeniz (F-255). She was decommissioned and scrapped in 2006.

== Awards, Citations and Campaign Ribbons ==
Joint Meritorious Unit Award
Navy Unit Commendation
Navy "E" Ribbon (3)
Navy Expeditionary Medal (with one bronze service star)
National Defense Service Medal (with one bronze service star)
Humanitarian Service Ribbon
Sea Service Deployment Ribbon

References : USS Donald B. Beary on NavSource
