= USS Downes (FF-1070) =

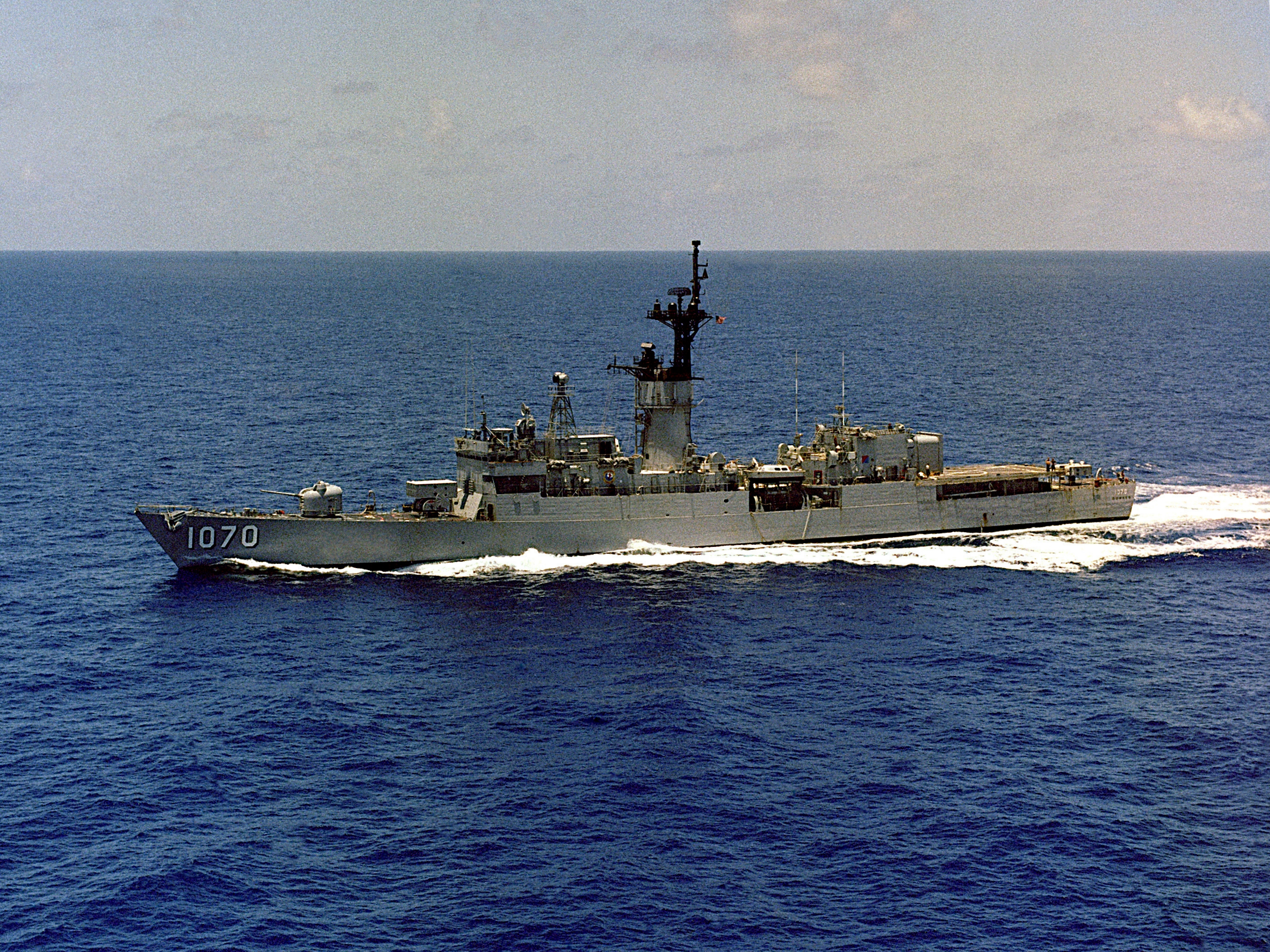
- USS Downes (FF-1070)

History

United States
- Name: Downes
- Ordered: 22 July 1964
- Builder: Todd Pacific Shipyards, Seattle, Washington
- Laid down: 5 September 1968
- Launched: 12 December 1969
- Acquired: 29 June 1971
- Commissioned: 28 August 1971
- Decommissioned: 10 June 1992
- Stricken: 11 January 1995
- Motto: Ready Now
- Nickname(s): Finest, Fastest, Fairest Frigate in the Fleet. Frigate From Hell.
- Fate: Disposed of in support of Fleet training exercise 15 August 2003
- Notes: Sunk at 031° 10' 01.0" North, 119° 48' 03.0" West

General characteristics
- Class & type: Knox-class frigate
- Displacement: 3,187 tons (4,168 full load)
- Length: 438 ft (133.5 m)
- Beam: 46 ft 9 in (14.2 m)
- Draft: 24 ft 9 in (7.5 m)
- Propulsion: 2 × CE 1,200 psi (8,300 kPa) boilers; 1 Westinghouse geared turbine; 1 shaft, 35,000 shp (26,000 kW)
- Speed: over 27 knots (31 mph; 50 km/h)
- Range: 4,500 nautical miles (8,330 km) at 20 knots (23 mph; 37 km/h)
- Complement: 18 officers, 267 enlisted
- Sensors & processing systems: AN/SPS-40 Air Search Radar; AN/SPS-67 Surface Search Radar; AN/SQS-26 Sonar; AN/SQR-18 Towed array sonar system; Mk68 Gun Fire Control System
- Electronic warfare & decoys: AN/SLQ-32 Electronics Warfare System
- Armament: one Mk-16 8 cell missile launcher for ASROC and Harpoon missiles; one Mk-42 5-inch/54 caliber gun; Mark 46 torpedoes from four single tube launchers); one NSSMS launcher for Sea Sparrow missiles, later replaced by one Phalanx CIWS, which was replaced by an NSSM Sea Sparrow
- Aircraft carried: one SH-2 Seasprite (LAMPS I) helicopter

USS Downes (DE-1070/FF-1070) was the 19th in the series of the Knox-class frigates. She was the third ship to be named for Commodore John Downes

== Design and description ==
The Knox-class design was derived from the Brooke-class frigate modified to extend range and without a long-range missile system. The ships had an overall length of 438 feet (133.5 m), a beam of 47 feet (14.3 m) and a draft of 25 feet (7.6 m). They displaced 4,066 long tons (4,131 t) at full load. Their crew consisted of 13 officers and 211 enlisted men.

The ships were equipped with one Westinghouse geared steam turbine that drove the single propeller shaft. The turbine was designed to produce 35,000 shaft horsepower (26,000 kW), using steam provided by 2 C-E boilers, to reach the designed speed of 27 knots (50 km/h; 31 mph). The Knox class had a range of 4,500 nautical miles (8,300 km; 5,200 mi) at a speed of 20 knots (37 km/h; 23 mph).

The Knox-class ships were armed with a 5"/54 caliber Mark 42 gun forward and a single 3"/50 caliber gun aft. They mounted an eight-round ASROC launcher between the 5-inch (127 mm) gun and the bridge. Close-range anti-submarine defense was provided by two twin 12.75-inch (324 mm) Mk 32 torpedo tubes. The ships were equipped with a torpedo-carrying DASH drone helicopter; its telescoping hangar and landing pad were positioned amidships aft of the mack. Beginning in the 1970s, the DASH was replaced by a SH-2 Seasprite LAMPS I helicopter and the hangar and landing deck were accordingly enlarged. Most ships also had the 3-inch (76 mm) gun replaced by an eight-cell BPDMS missile launcher in the early 1970s.

== Construction and career ==
Downes Was featured on Season 1 Episode 4 of Simon and Simon titled "A Recipe for Disaster" Directly after the opening credits - episode aired on 17 Dec 1981.

Downes's keel was laid 5 September 1968 by Todd Pacific Shipyards Corp., Seattle, Washington, and was christened on 13 December 1969 during launching by her sponsor Mrs. Philip L. Kelton, the great-granddaughter of the late Commodore John Downes. The ship was commissioned 28 August 1971

Downes performed Anti-Submarine Warfare operations as a part of Destroyer Squadron 31, escort duty and naval diplomacy support, when necessary, for the Pacific Fleet. During RIMPAC 89, the ship rescued one of two crew members washed overboard due to heavy seas. Decommissioned on 5 June 1992, Downes was stricken from the Naval Vessel Register on 11 January 1995.

Downes was disposed during fleet training in 2003 and sunk close to Mare Island during a SINKEX.
