= USS Knox (FF-1052) =

US Navy destroyer

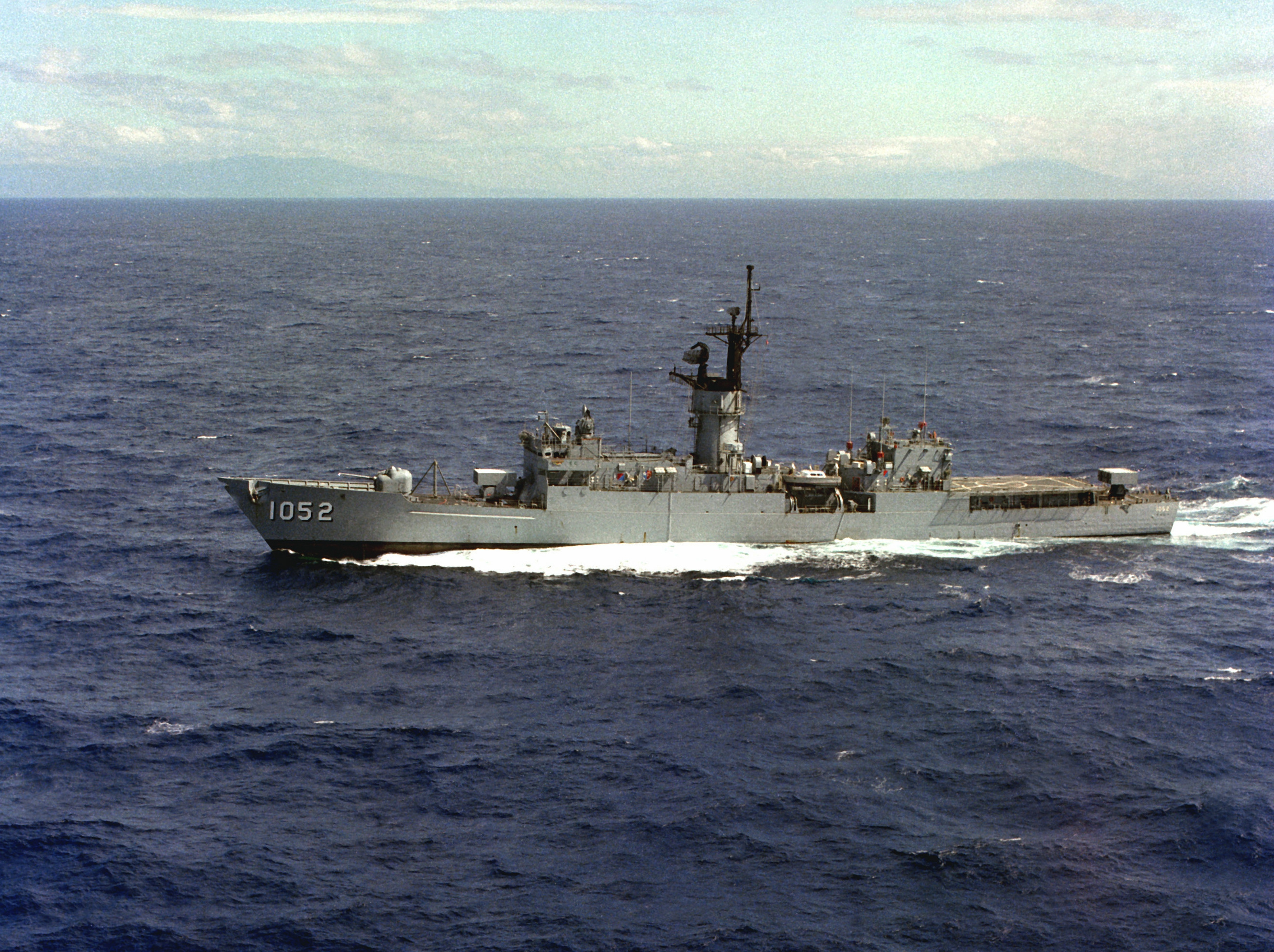
- USS Knox (FF-1052)

History

United States
- Name: Knox
- Namesake: Commodore Dudley Wright Knox
- Awarded: 22 July 1964
- Builder: Todd Pacific Shipyards, Seattle, Washington
- Laid down: 5 October 1965
- Launched: 19 November 1966
- Sponsored by: Mrs. Peter A. Sturtevant
- Acquired: 28 March 1969
- Commissioned: 12 April 1969
- Decommissioned: 14 February 1992
- Reclassified: 30 June 1975
- Stricken: 11 January 1995
- Identification: Hull symbol: DE-1052; Hull symbol: FF-1052; Code letters: NAAS
- Motto: First and Finest
- Fate: Sunk as target, 7 August 2007

General characteristics
- Class & type: Knox-class frigate
- Displacement: 3,020 long tons (3,070 t) (standard); 4,065 long tons (4,130 t) (full load)
- Length: 415 ft (126 m) lwl; 438 ft (134 m) loa
- Beam: 46 ft 9 in (14.25 m)
- Draft: 24 ft 9 in (7.54 m)
- Installed power: 2 × CE 1,200 psi (8,300 kPa) boilers; 35,000 shp (26,000 kW)
- Propulsion: 1 × Westinghouse geared turbine; 1 × shaft
- Speed: over 27 kn (50 km/h; 31 mph)
- Range: 4,500 nmi (8,300 km; 5,200 mi) at 20 kn (37 km/h; 23 mph)
- Complement: 16 officers, 211 men
- Sensors & processing systems: AN/SPS-10 surface search; AN/SPS-40 air search; AN/SQS-26CX sonar; AN/SQS-35 IVDS towed array sonar
- Electronic warfare & decoys: AN/SLQ-32 Electronics Warfare System
- Armament: 1 × 5 in (127 mm)/54 caliber Mark 42 gun; 1 × 8-tube ASROC + Harpoon launcher; 1 × 8-cell RIM-7 Sea Sparrow launcher
- Aircraft carried: 1 × DASH drone helicopter; 1 × SH-2 LAMPS I helicopter (refit)

USS Knox (DE/FF-1052) was the lead ship of her class of destroyer escorts in the United States Navy. Knox was named after Commodore Dudley Wright Knox, and was the second US Navy ship named Knox. In 1975, she was redesignated a frigate. She served from 1969 to 1992 and was sunk as a target in 2007.

== Design and description ==
The Knox-class design was derived from the Brooke-class frigate modified to extend range and without a long-range missile system. The ship had an overall length of 438 ft (133.5 m), a beam of 47 ft (14.3 m) and a draft of 25 ft (7.6 m). It displaced 4,065 long tons (4,130 t) at full load. Its crew consisted of 16 officers and 211 enlisted men.

The ship was equipped with one Westinghouse geared steam turbine that drove the single propeller shaft. The turbine was designed to produce 35,000 shp (26,000 kW), using steam provided by two C-E boilers, to reach the designed speed of 27 kn (50 km/h; 31 mph). The Knox class had a range of 4,500 nmi (8,300 km; 5,200 mi) at a speed of 20 kn (37 km/h; 23 mph).

The Knox-class ship was armed with a single 5-inch (127 mm)/54 caliber Mark 42 gun. It mounted an eight-round ASROC launcher between the 5-inch gun and the bridge. Its close-range anti-submarine defense was provided by two twin 12.75-inch (324 mm) Mk 32 torpedo tubes. The ship was equipped with a torpedo-carrying DASH drone helicopter; its telescoping hangar and landing pad were positioned amidships aft of the mack. Beginning in the 1970s, the DASH was replaced by a SH-2 Seasprite LAMPS I helicopter and the hangar and landing deck were accordingly enlarged. Most ships had an eight-cell BPDMS missile launcher added in the early 1970s.

== Construction ==
She was laid down on 5 October 1965, by Todd Pacific Shipyards, Seattle, Washington; launched on 19 November 1966; sponsored by Mrs. Peter A. Sturtevant, the granddaughter of Commodore Knox; and was commissioned on 12 April 1969, with Commander William A. Lamm in command.

== Service history ==
Knox performed search and rescue operations and provided evacuation, blockade, and surveillance support, when necessary, for the Pacific Fleet. In April 1975, Knox participated in Operation Eagle Pull, the evacuation of Phnom Penh, Cambodia. Knox was redesignated a frigate on 30 June 1975 as FF-1052.

== Disposition ==
Decommissioned on 14 February 1992, Knox was stricken from the Naval Vessel Register on 11 January 1995. NAVSEA temporarily placed Knox on the donation hold list but removed her from the list around 2003. Knox was sunk as a target off Guam, during "Exercise Valiant Shield" (2007) on 7 August 2007.

== Awards, citations and campaign ribbons ==
Navy Meritorious Unit Commendation (with two bronze service stars)
Navy Expeditionary Medal
National Defense Service Medal (with one bronze service star)
Armed Forces Expeditionary Medal (with one bronze service star)
Vietnam Service Medal (with one bronze service star)
Humanitarian Service Ribbon
Sea Service Deployment Ribbon
Vietnam Campaign Medal

== Gallery ==
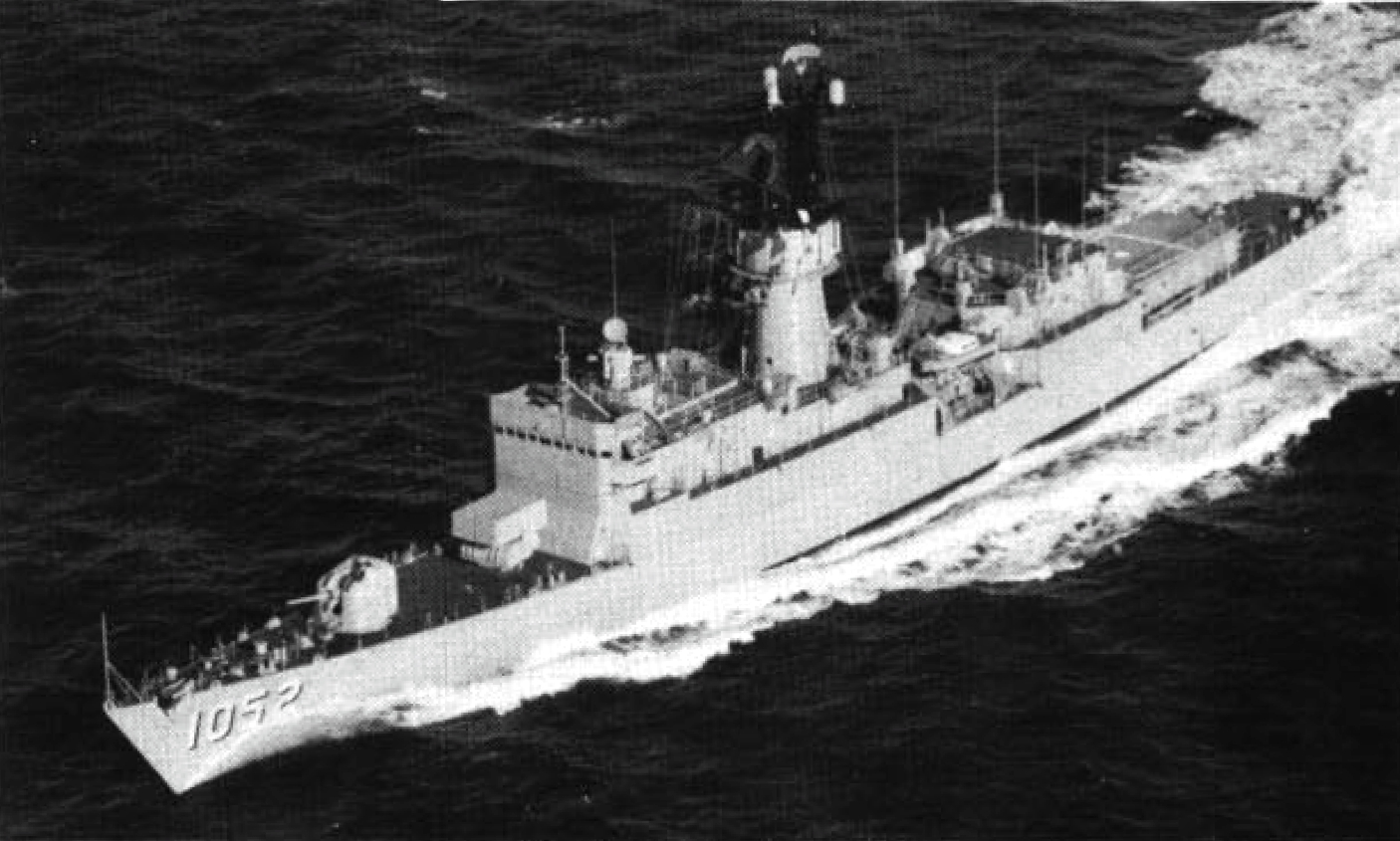
Knox in 1969.

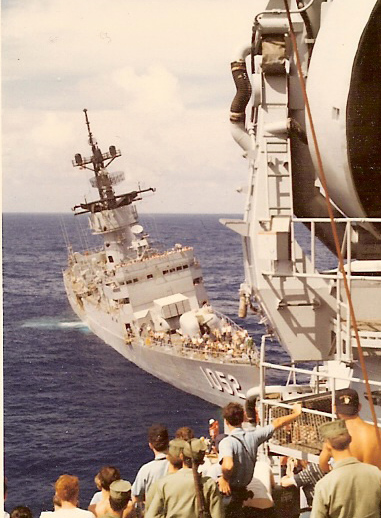
USS Chicago passes tow line to Knox after Knox was disabled by a JP-5 fire in engineering spaces on 4 March 1971, while en route from Guam to Hawaii.

== In popular culture ==
Knox appears in the original Hawaii Five-O season 8 episode "Murder: Eyes Only".
