= Knox-class frigate =

Class of Anti-Submarine Warfare frigates

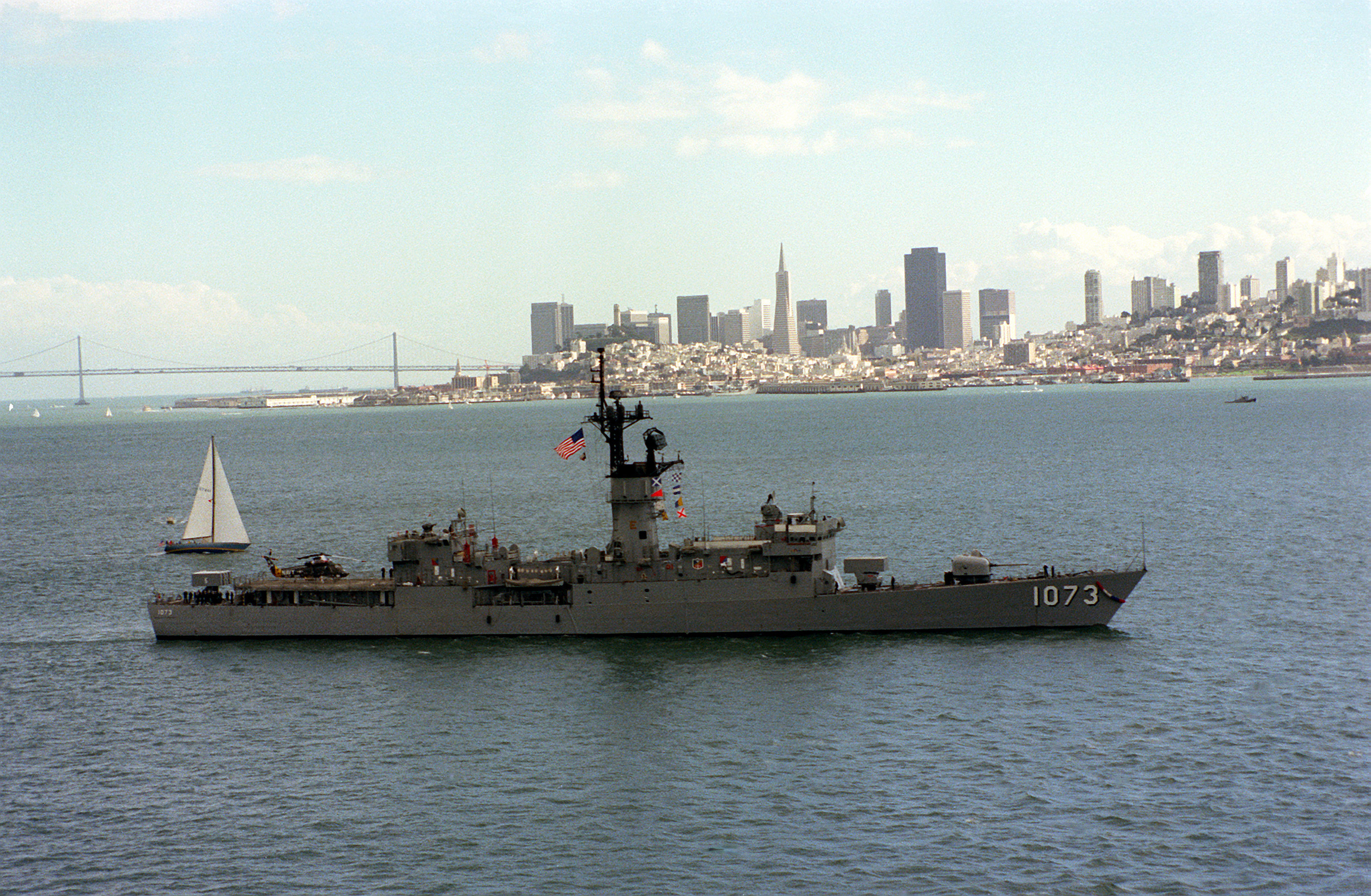
- Knox-class frigate USS Robert E. Peary (FF-1073) and the skyline of San Francisco in the background

Class overview
- Builders: Todd Shipyard, Seattle and San Pedro; Lockheed Shipbuilding and Construction Company; Avondale Shipyard
- Operators: United States Navy; Republic of China Navy; Egyptian Navy; Hellenic Navy; Mexican Navy; Royal Thai Navy; Turkish Naval Forces
- Preceded by: Garcia class
- Subclasses: Baleares class; Allende class; Phutthayotfa Chulalok class
- Built: 1965–1974
- In commission: 1969–1994 (USN)
- Planned: 55
- Completed: 46
- Canceled: 9
- Active: 2 (Egypt); 5 (Taiwan)
- Retired: 46 (USN), some were transferred to other countries where they are in active service
- Preserved: 2

General characteristics
- Type: Ocean escort (1964–1975); Frigate (1975–1994)
- Displacement: 4,065 long tons (4,130 t) (full load)
- Length: 438 ft (134 m)
- Beam: 46 ft 9 in (14.25 m)
- Draft: 24 ft 9 in (7.54 m)
- Installed power: 2 × 1,200 psi (8,300 kPa) boilers; 35,000 shp (26,000 kW)
- Propulsion: 1 × Westinghouse steam turbine; 1 × shaft
- Speed: 27 kn (50 km/h; 31 mph)
- Range: 4,500 nmi (8,300 km; 5,200 mi) at 20 kn (37 km/h; 23 mph)
- Complement: 17 officers, 240 enlisted
- Sensors & processing systems: AN/SPS-10 Surface Search Radar; AN/SPS-40 Air Search Radar; AN/SPS-67 Surface Search Radar; AN/SQS-26 active/passive Sonar; AN/SQS-35 active/passive towed Sonar; AN/SQR-18 Towed array sonar system; AN/SPG-53 Mk68 Gun Fire Control System
- Electronic warfare & decoys: As Built AN/WLR-1C – AN/ULQ-6C and AN/SLA-15 (Comprising AN/SLQ-26 System); AN/SLQ-32 Electronics Warfare System and Mark 36 SRBOC
- Armament: As built: 1 × 5 in (127 mm)/54 caliber Mark 42 gun; 1 × Mk-16 8–cell ASROC launcher; 2 × dual Mark 32 Mark 46 torpedo launchers; First refit: 1 × Mk-25 8–cell RIM-7 Sea Sparrow (BPDMS) (DE-1052–1069 and 1071–1083); 1 × Mk-29 8–cell RIM-7H Improved Sea Sparrow (IBPDMS) (DE-1070); Mk-16 2 cells converted to launch HARPOON; Second refit: 1 × Phalanx CIWS (RIM-7/7H Sea Sparrow removed)
- Aircraft carried: 1 × QH-50 (DASH) helicopter; 1 × SH-2 Seasprite (LAMPS I) helicopter (refit)

The 46 Knox-class frigates were the largest, last, and most numerous of the US Navy's second-generation anti-submarine warfare (ASW) escorts. Originally laid down as ocean escorts (formerly called destroyer escorts), they were all redesignated as frigates on 30 June 1975, in the 1975 ship reclassification plan and their hull designation changed from 'DE' to 'FF'. The Knox class was the Navy's last destroyer-type design with a steam turbine powerplant.

Due to their unequal comparison to destroyers then in service (larger size with lower speed and only a single propeller and 5-inch gun), they became known to a generation of destroyermen as "McNamara's Folly", a jab at then-Secretary of the Defense Robert McNamara.

These ships were retired from the US Navy at the end of the Cold War due to their relatively high running costs, a declining defense budget, and the need for ships with a more advanced anti-submarine capability. None of the ships served more than 23 years in the US Navy, and by 1994, all of the class had been retired, although some remain in service with foreign nations such as Egypt, Taiwan, Thailand, and Mexico.

== Design ==
Designed under project number SCB 199C, the Knox was planned as the follow-on to the twin 5" gun-armed Garcia class frigates and the Tartar missile-equipped Brooke-class frigates. Their initial design incorporated the prior classes' pressure-fired boilers in a similar-sized hull designed around the massive bow-mounted AN/SQS-26 sonar, with increased endurance and reduced crew size. Anti-submarine armament was to consist of RUR-5 ASROC anti submarine missiles together with the QH-50 DASH drone helicopter, while defensive armament was to be the RIM-46 Sea Mauler short range anti-aircraft missile backed up by a single 5-inch/54 caliber Mark 42 gun.

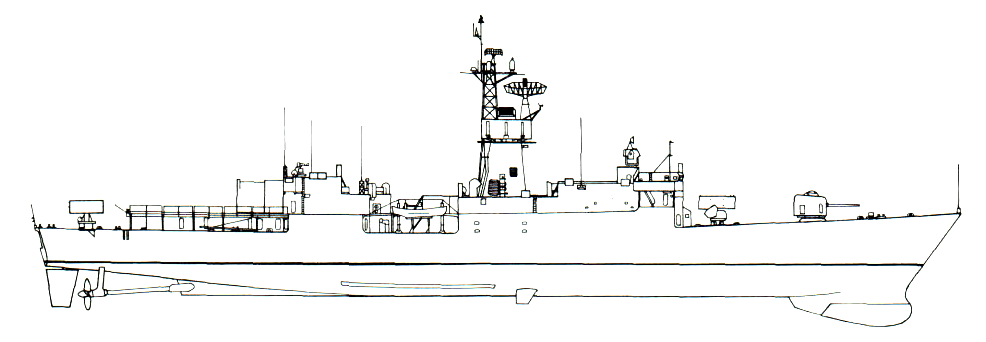
Drawing of a Knox-class frigate as built

The design soon ran into problems however, with the US Navy deciding to switch to conventional 1,200 psi (8,300 kPa) boilers, requiring a redesign, and the ships became longer and heavier in order to accommodate the less compact power plants. Furthermore, Sea Mauler was cancelled in 1965, leaving the ships to complete without any anti-aircraft system except the 5" gun.

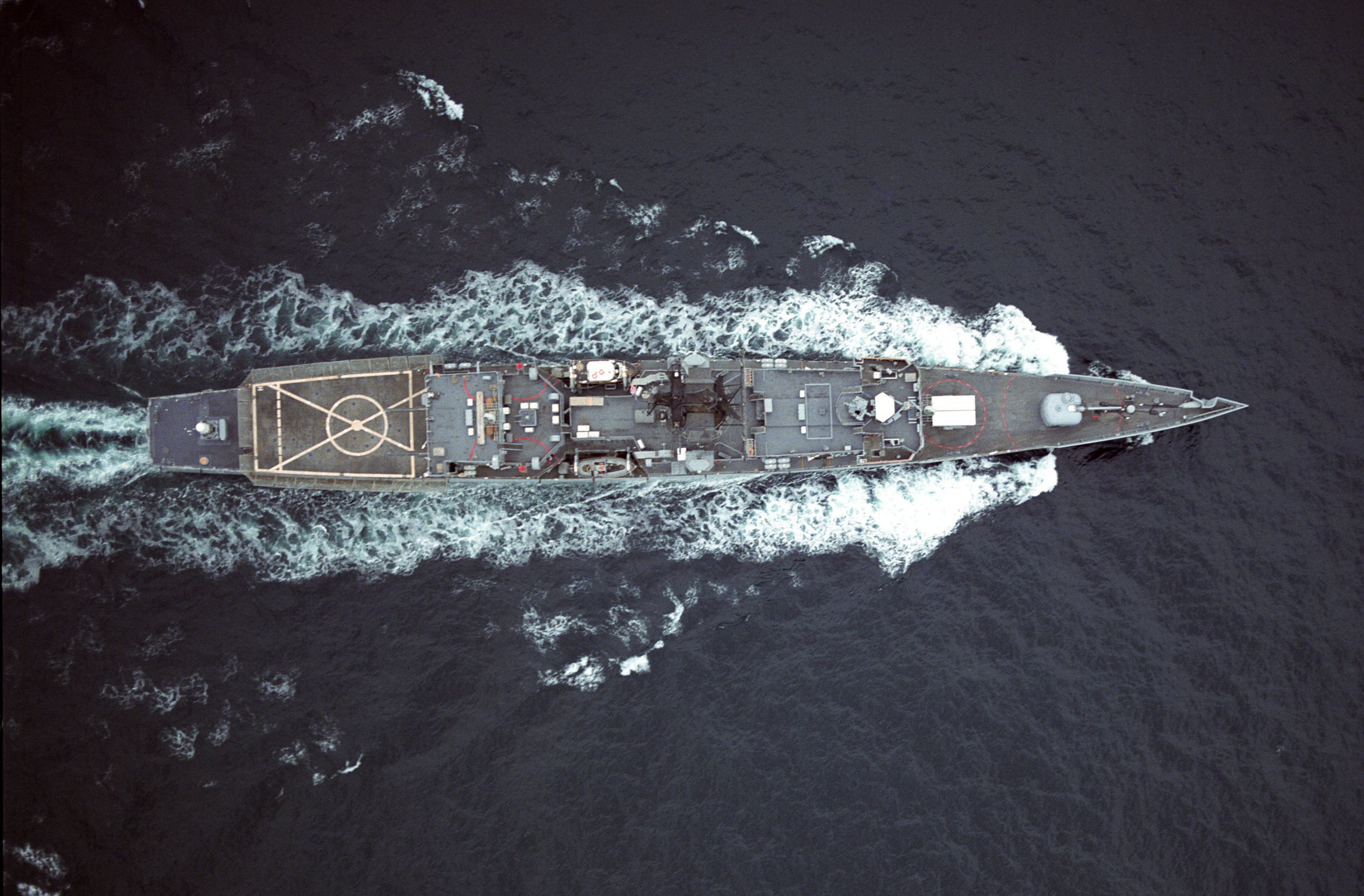
Overhead view of Knox-class frigate USS Fanning (FF-1076)

The steam plant for these ships consists of two Combustion Engineering or Babcock & Wilcox "D" type boilers, each equipped with a high-pressure (supercharger) forced draught air supply system, with a plant working pressure of 1,200 psi (8,300 kPa) and 1,000 °F (538 °C) superheat and rated at 35,000 shp (26,000 kW) driving a single screw. This gives them a speed of 27 kn (50 km/h; 31 mph).

The ships were designed primarily as anti-submarine warfare (ASW) platforms. Their main anti-submarine sensor was the large bow-mounted AN/SQS-26CX low-frequency scanning sonar, operating as an active sonar at a frequency of about 3.5 kHz and passively at 1.5–4 kHz. The active modes of operation included direct path, to a range of about 20,000 yd (18,000 m), bottom bounce, and convergence zone, which could give ranges of up to about 70,000 yd (64,000 m), well outside the capability of ASROC, and requiring the use of a helicopter to exploit. An eight-round ASROC launcher (with 16 missiles carried) was fitted between the gun turret and the bridge, backed up by four fixed 12.75 in (324 mm) Mark 32 anti-submarine torpedo tubes. A flight deck and hangar for operating the DASH drone helicopter was fitted aft.

== Construction ==
Ten ships were authorized in Fiscal Year 1964, sixteen in 1965, and ten each for FYs 1966, 67 and 68; six were canceled in 1968, and four more in 1969. While the FY64 and FY65 ships were ordered from four different shipyards, later ships (DE-1078 onwards) were all ordered from Avondale Shipyards in order to cut costs. These ships were built on a production line, with prefabricated modules being assembled upside down, welded together and then rotated into an upright position. They were originally commissioned as destroyer escorts (DEs) 1052–1097 in 1969–1974, but were redesignated as frigates (FF) on 30 June 1975.

The lead ship of the class, Knox (FF-1052), was laid down 5 October 1965, and commissioned 12 April 1969, at the Todd Shipyards in Seattle, Washington.

== Modifications ==
The USS Joseph Hewes (FF-1078) and subsequent ships of the class were modified to enable them to serve as flagships. The primary change was a slightly different arrangement of the "Officer's Country" staterooms with additional staterooms in a new 01 level structure which replaced the open deck between the boats. The stateroom on the port side under the bridge was designated as a "flag" stateroom, with additional staterooms for flag staff when serving as a flagship. These ships have been referred to as the Joseph Hewes-sub-class.

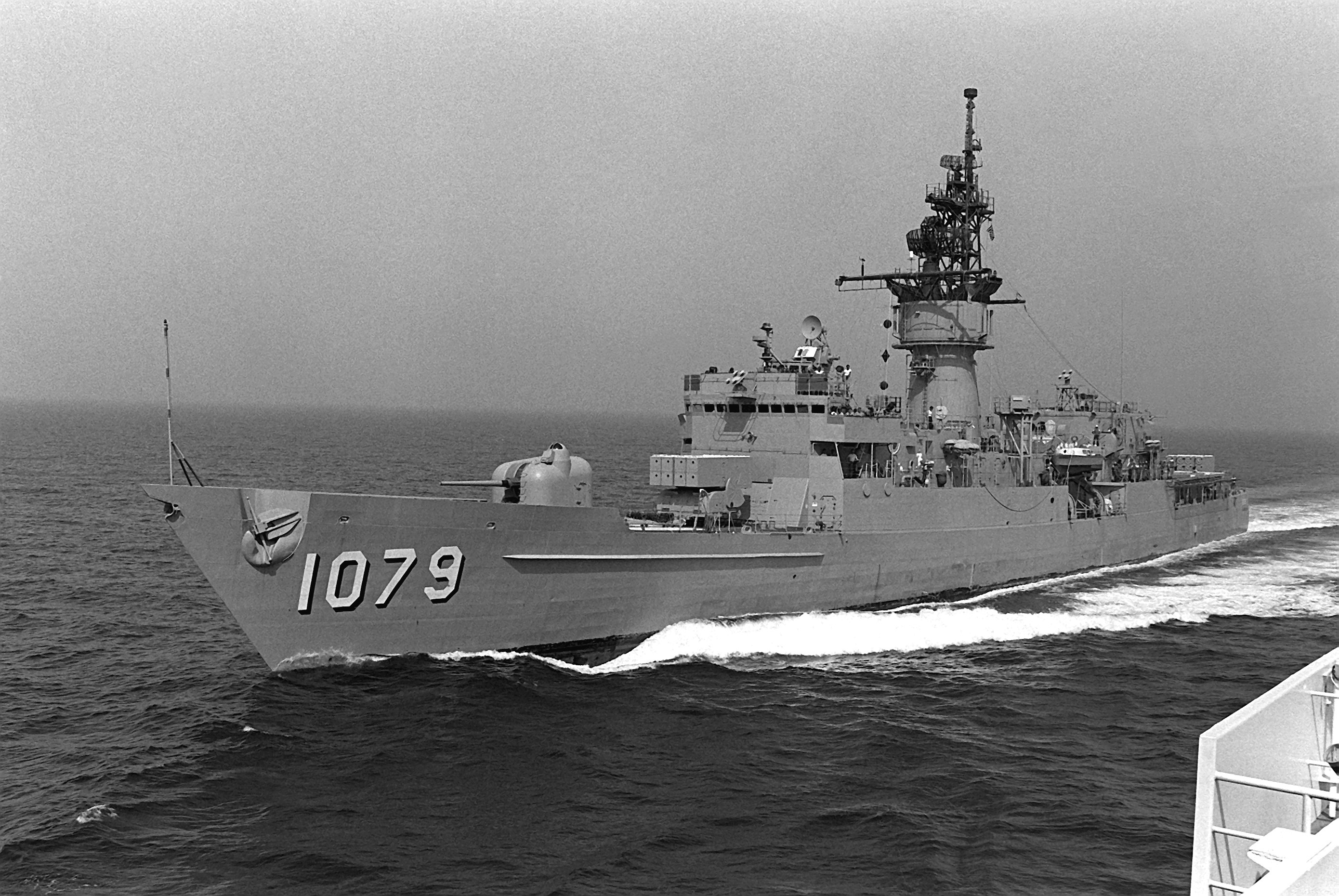
Bow modifications including bulwark and horizontal spray strake can be seen on USS Bowen (FF-1079) in 1984.

The Knox class had been criticized for deck wetness and there were a number of instances of damage to the forward weapons mounts in heavy seas, so the class were refitted with "hurricane bows" beginning with Bagley (FF-1069) in 1979. The modification heightened the bow section, adding bulwarks and spray strakes to prevent burrowing into on-coming seas and to better protect the forecastle armament.

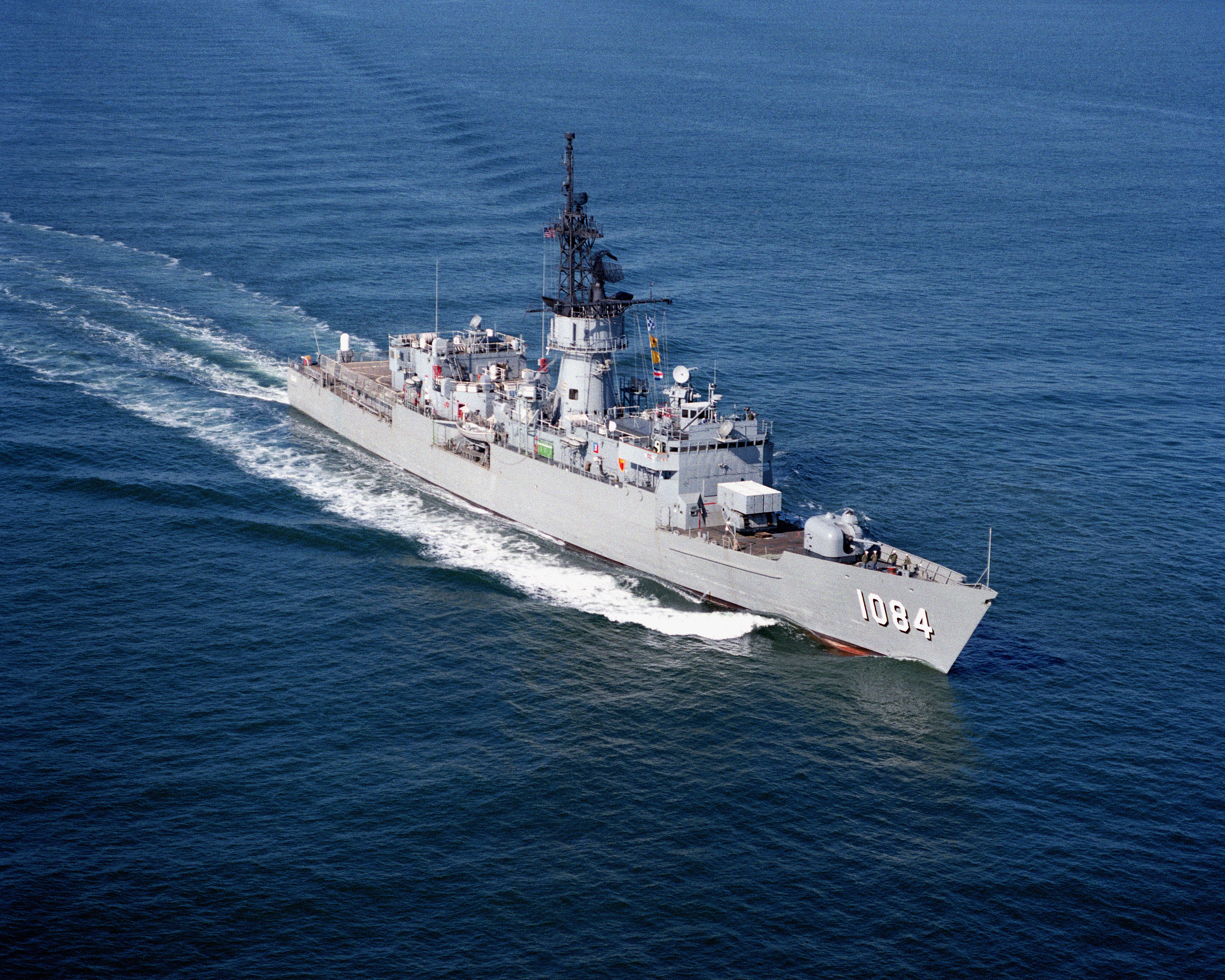
Aerial view of Knox-class frigate USS McCandless (FF-1084)

Twenty-five ships of the class (DE-1052, 1056, 1063–1071 and 1078–1097) were refitted with the AN/SQS-35(V) Independent Variable Depth Sonar, an active sonar operating at about 13 kHz. The IVDS' sonar transducers were packaged within a 2-ton fiberglass-enclosed "fish" containing the sonar array and a gyro-compass/sensor package launched by the massive 13V Hoist from a stern compartment, located just beneath the main deck, to depths of up to 600 ft (180 m). The IVDS could take advantage of water layer temperature conditions in close-range (less than 20,000 yd (18,290 m)) submarine detection, tracking and fire-control. The AN/SQS-35 "fish" was later modified to tow an AN/SQR-18A TACTASS passive towed array sonar. The DASH drone proved unreliable, and following its withdrawal in 1973, the ships' helicopter facilities were expanded to accommodate the larger, crewed Kaman Seasprite LAMPS 1 helicopter.

Thirty-one ships (DE-1052–1069 and 1071–1083) were fitted with an eight-round Basic Point Defence Missile System (BPDMS) launcher for RIM-7 Sea Sparrow missiles in place of the cancelled Sea Mauler short range surface to air missile system, while Downes (FF-1070) was fitted with a NATO Sea Sparrow (IBPDMS) launcher. It was planned to equip the other 14 ships with Sea Chaparral, based on the Sidewinder air-to-air missile, but this plan was abandoned. Most ships were refitted with a 20 mm (0.79 in) Phalanx CIWS aft during the 1980s, replacing the Sea Sparrow launcher.

In the 1970s, several ships received an interim surface warfare upgrade allowing Standard ARM anti-radar missiles to be fired from the ships' ASROC launcher. Later, all ships were modified to launch Harpoon anti-ship missiles from the ASROC launcher, which could carry two Harpoons, with two more carried in the ships' ASROC magazine.

== Baleares class ==
Five modified ships were built in Spain for the Spanish Navy as the Baleares-class. In these ships, the Sea Sparrow launcher and helicopter facilities were replaced by a Mk 22 launcher for sixteen Standard surface-to-air missiles, giving them a limited area air-defence capability.

== Chi Yang-class ==
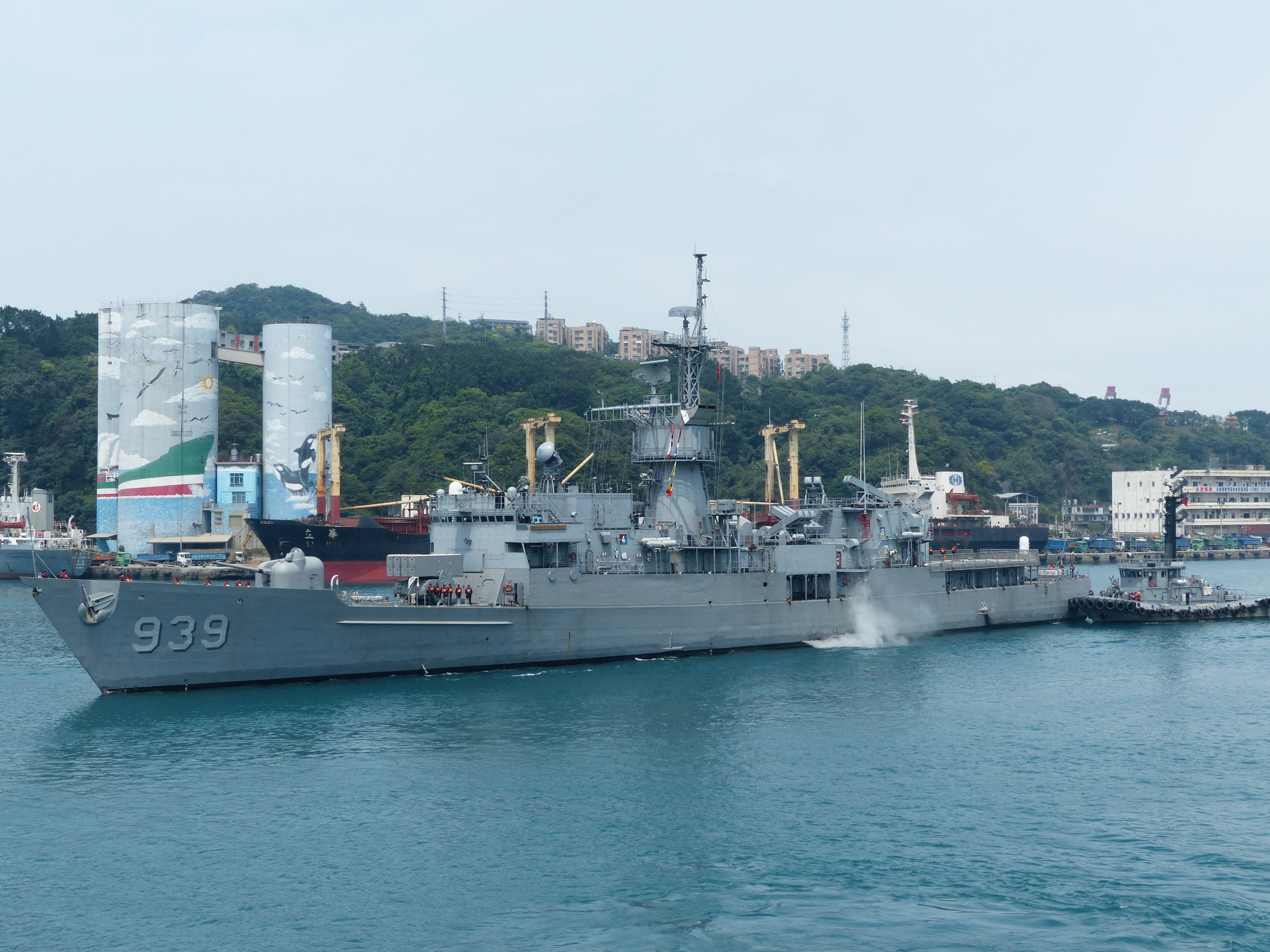
Chi Yang-class ROCS Yi Yang (FFG-939)

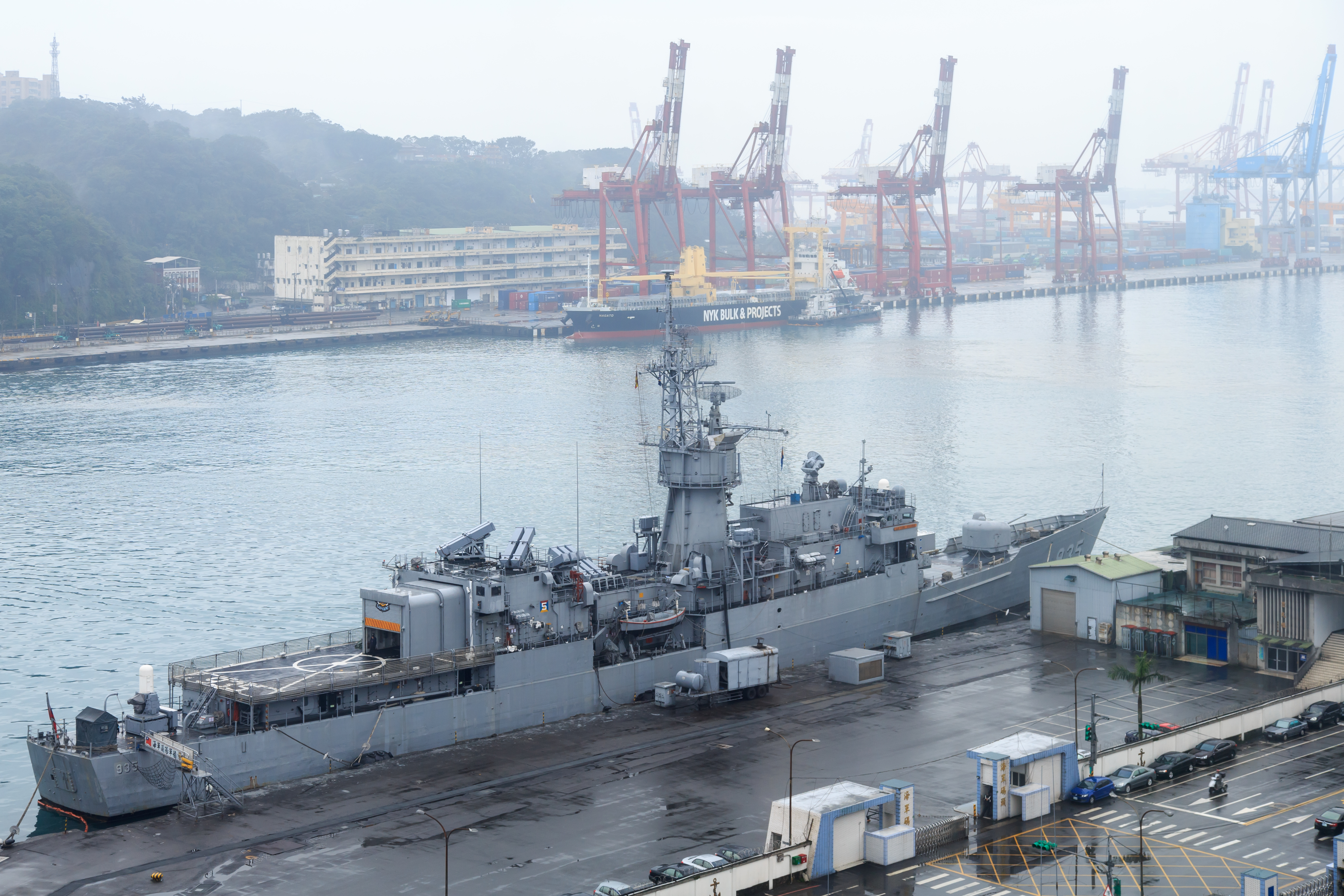
Chi Yang-class ROCS Lan Yang (FFG-935)

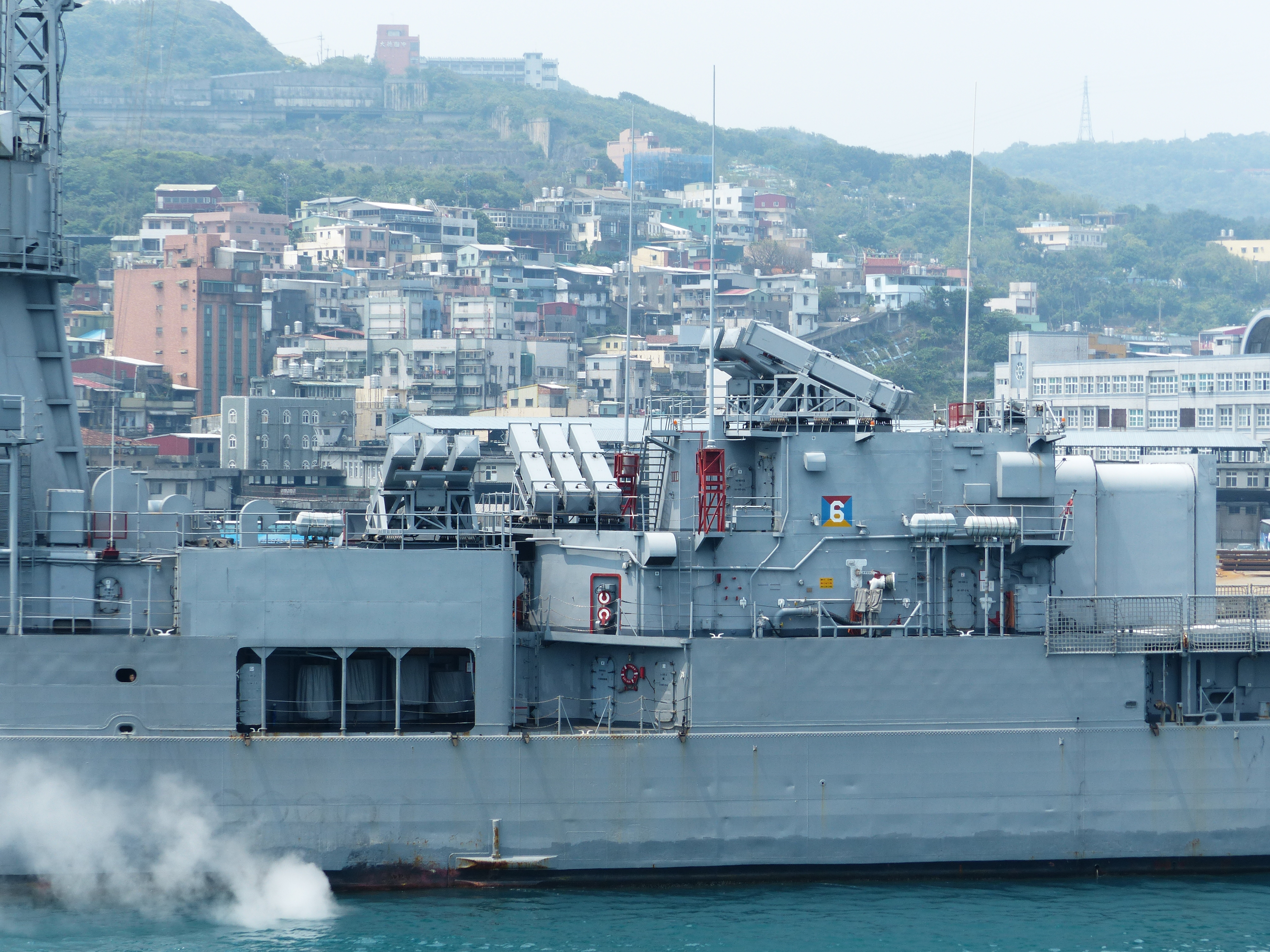
Chi Yang-class ROCS Yi Yang (FFG-939) has 10 SM-1 missiles installed in two forward twin box launchers on top of the helicopter hangar, and two triple box launchers installed between the stack and the hangar.

In the 1990s, the US agreed to transfer eight Knox-class frigates to Taiwan's Republic of China Navy (ROCN). The ROCN, anticipating future difficulties in maintaining the steam plants on these ships, originally contemplated an ambitious plan to replace these plants with diesel engines. However, due to budget considerations and the acquisition of newer ships, this plan is now believed to have been shelved. These frigates were renamed to Chi Yang-class frigates and assigned to the ROCN 168 Patrol Squadron.

By 2005, the ROCN had removed several systems from the retired Yang class destroyers (upgraded World War II-vintage Gearing class) and transferred them to seven of the Chi Yang class. These systems include SM-1MR Standard missile with their Mark 32 box launchers, H-930 modular combat system, DA-08/2 air/surface search radar, and STIR-180 illuminating radar. Each Chi Yang-class frigate has 10 SM-1 missiles installed in two forward twin box launchers on top of the helicopter hangar, and two triple box launchers installed between the stack and the hangar, pointing to port and starboard. Chi Yang (FFG-932) did not receive the upgrade.

The ASW capability of the Chi Yang-class is provided by its AN/SQS-26 bow-mounted sonar, AN/SQS-35(v) variable depth sonar, AN/SQR-18(v)1 passive towed array sonar, McDonnell Douglas MD 500 Defender ASW helicopter, Mk-16 8-cell RUR-5 ASROC/RGM-84 Harpoon box launcher, and four Mk46 324 mm (12.8 in) torpedoes. While on ASW patrol, the frigate carries two Harpoon SSMs and six ASROCs in its Mk-16 box launcher.

There are some speculations that these ships might be upgraded with Hsiung Feng III supersonic missiles, to expand its capabilities. However, due to the outdated battle system onboard and the aging ships, the class is expected to be replaced as a whole by the newly built Taiwanese Light Frigate.

== Ships in class ==
Ship Name	Hull No.	Builder	Commission– Decommission	Fate	Link
Knox	FF-1052	Todd, Seattle	1969–1992	Sunk as target	
Roark	FF-1053	Todd, Seattle	1969–1991	Scrapped	
Gray	FF-1054	Todd, Seattle	1970–1991	Scrapped	
Hepburn	FF-1055	Todd, San Pedro	1969–1991	Sunk as target	
Connole	FF-1056	Avondale	1969–1992	To Greece, renamed Ipirus (F-456) Sunk as target	
Rathburne	FF-1057	Lockheed	1970–1992	Sunk as target	
Meyerkord	FF-1058	Todd, San Pedro	1969–1991	Scrapped	
W. S. Sims	FF-1059	Avondale	1970–1991	Grant aid to Turkey as spare parts hulk	
Lang	FF-1060	Todd, San Pedro	1970–1991	Scrapped	
Patterson	FF-1061	Avondale	1970–1991	Scrapped	
Whipple	FF-1062	Todd, Seattle	1970–1992	To Mexico, renamed Almirante Francisco Javier Mina (F-214)	
Reasoner	FF-1063	Lockheed	1971–1993	To Turkey, renamed Kocatepe (F-252). Sunk as target in 2005	
Lockwood	FF-1064	Todd, Seattle	1970–1993	Scrapped	
Stein	FF-1065	Lockheed	1972–1992	To Mexico, renamed Ignacio Allende (F-211), Sunk 27 April 2022	
Marvin Shields	FF-1066	Todd, Seattle	1971–1992	To Mexico, renamed Mariano Abasolo (F-212)	
Francis Hammond	FF-1067	Todd, San Pedro	1971–1992	Scrapped	
Vreeland	FF-1068	Avondale	1970–1992	To Greece, renamed Makedonia (F-458) Decommissioned	
Bagley	FF-1069	Lockheed	1972–1991	Scrapped	
Downes	FF-1070	Todd, Seattle	1971–1992	Sunk as target	
Badger	FF-1071	Todd, San Pedro	1970–1991	Sunk as target	
Blakely	FF-1072	Avondale	1970–1991	Scrapped	
Robert E. Peary	FF-1073	Lockheed	1972–1992	To Taiwan, renamed Chih Yang (FF-932) Sunk as target 2020	
Harold E. Holt	FF-1074	Todd, San Pedro	1971–1992	Sunk as target	
Trippe	FF-1075	Avondale	1970–1992	To Greece, renamed Thraki (F-457) sunk as target	
Fanning	FF-1076	Todd, San Pedro	1971–1993	To Turkey, renamed Adatepe (F-251)	
Ouellet	FF-1077	Avondale	1970–1993	To Thailand, renamed HTMS Phutthaloetla Naphalai	
Joseph Hewes	FF-1078	Avondale	1971–1994	To Taiwan, renamed Lan Yang (FF-935), decommissioned January 2025	
Bowen	FF-1079	Avondale	1971–1994	To Turkey, renamed Akdeniz (F-257)	
Paul	FF-1080	Avondale	1971–1992	To Turkey as spare parts hulk	
Aylwin	FF-1081	Avondale	1971–1992	To Taiwan, renamed Ning Yang (FF-938)	
Elmer Montgomery	FF-1082	Avondale	1971–1993	To Turkey as spare parts hulk	
Cook	FF-1083	Avondale	1971–1992	To Taiwan, renamed Hae Yang (FF-936) sunk as target	
McCandless	FF-1084	Avondale	1972–1994	To Turkey, renamed Trakya (F-257)	
Donald B. Beary	FF-1085	Avondale	1972–1994	To Turkey, renamed Karadeniz (F-255)	
Brewton	FF-1086	Avondale	1972–1992	To Taiwan, renamed Fong Yang (FF-933)	
Kirk	FF-1087	Avondale	1972–1993	To Taiwan, renamed Fen Yang (FF-934)	
Barbey	FF-1088	Avondale	1972–1992	To Taiwan, renamed Hwai Yang (FF-937)	
Jesse L. Brown	FF-1089	Avondale	1973–1994	To Egypt, renamed Dumyat (F961)	
Ainsworth	FF-1090	Avondale	1973–1994	To Turkey, renamed Ege (F-256)	
Miller	FF-1091	Avondale	1973–1991	To Turkey as spare parts hulk	
Thomas C. Hart	FF-1092	Avondale	1973–1993	To Turkey, renamed Zafer (F-253)	
Capodanno	FF-1093	Avondale	1973–1993	To Turkey, renamed Muavenet (F-250)	
Pharris	FF-1094	Avondale	1974–1992	To Mexico, renamed ARM Guadalupe Victoria (F-213)	
Truett	FF-1095	Avondale	1974–1994	To Thailand, renamed HTMS Phutthayotfa Chulalok	
Valdez	FF-1096	Avondale	1974–1991	To Taiwan, renamed Yi Yang (FF-939)	
Moinester	FF-1097	Avondale	1974–1994	To Egypt, renamed Rasheed (F.962)	
Unnamed	DE-1098 through DE-1100	—N/a	—N/a	Cancelled 24 February 1969 (DE-1101 was to be an experimental ship)	
Unnamed	DE-1102 through DE-1107	—N/a	—N/a	Cancelled 24 February 1969 (DE-1101 was to be an experimental ship)	

== See also ==
- List of naval ship classes in service

Equivalent frigates of the same era

- Krivak class
- Georges Leygues class
- Kortenaer class
- Niterói class
- Bremen class
- Maestrale class
