= McNamara's Folly =

McNamara's Folly refers to at least two decisions by Secretary of Defense Robert McNamara that were of a questionable nature.

- Knox-class ocean escorts, which were designed before 1965 with several economies that caused lower performance in comparison to their predecessors.
- Project 100,000, a controversial 1966-1971 program to recruit soldiers who would previously have been below military mental or medical standards.

== See also ==
- McNamara fallacy.
