= MIM-46 Mauler =

Anti-aircraft missile system

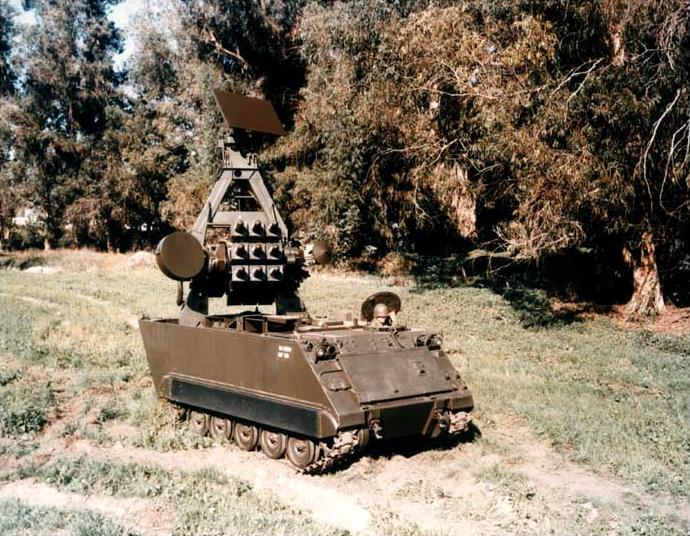
MIM-46 Mauler prototype.

The General Dynamics Mauler was a self-propelled anti-aircraft missile system designed to a late 1950s US Army requirement for a system to combat low-flying high-performance tactical fighters and short-range ballistic missiles.

The system was a XM546 vehicle, based on the M113 chassis, carrying nine MIM-46 missiles in launch canisters, a tracking and illumination continuous wave radar, and the fire control system.

An ambitious design for its era, the Mauler ran into intractable problems during development, and was eventually canceled in November 1965. Cancellation of Mauler left the US Army with no modern anti-aircraft weapon, and they rushed development of the much simpler MIM-72 Chaparral and M163 Tracked Vulcan to fill this niche. These weapons were much less capable than Mauler, and were intended solely as a stop-gap solution until more capable vehicles were developed. In spite of this, no real replacement entered service until the late 1990s.

Both the US Navy and British Army were also expecting Mauler to fulfil their own short-range needs and its cancellation left them with the same problem. They developed RIM-7 Sea Sparrow and Rapier missile, respectively, to fill these needs.

== Background ==
=== Duster and Vigilante ===
After WWII, the US Army's first mobile anti-aircraft weapons were based on the Bofors 40 mm guns with first the M19 Multiple Gun Motor Carriage then the M42 Duster. First entering production in 1952, the Duster quickly became outdated as aircraft performance increased. Since manual acquisition, tracking and ranging left much to be desired RADUSTER envisioned adding radar ranging to the Duster. By 1955 it was realized that no simple modification to the M42 Duster would meet the need. Thus in 1956 the plan was to improve the T50 antiaircraft fire control system to the RADUSTER. One development RADUSTER and three user test weapons were created before termination.

Driven by the need to counter jet aircraft flying at up to 10,000 ft (3,000 m) and a slant range of 14,000 ft (4,300 m), the new system of a 37 mm Gatling gun on top of a modified M113 Armored Personnel Carrier chassis was approved as the T249 Vigilante in late 1956. A T248 towed version was also developed. Compared to the M42, the high (3,000 rounds per minute) firing rate of the Vigilante gave it much better performance against high-speed aircraft.

As the Vigilante program continued, the Army decided that any gun-based system was hopeless as speeds increased and engagement times dropped. The Vigilante had a maximum effective range of about 3,000 yd (2,700 m), and its shells took about 5 seconds to cross this distance. A jet aircraft flying at 500 mph (800 km/h) would cover over a kilometer during those 5 seconds. By the time a radar-assisted sighting system could develop a firing solution, the target would be out of range. The Army decided to cancel Vigilante and keep the Duster in service until a much more capable phase III all-missile system arrived to replace it.

=== Phase III ===
Phase III was intended to produce an ultimate answer to air defense of front line Army troops. A small mobile missile system was envisioned to engage both aircraft and missiles up to 10,000 feet. It was very clear by May 1956 that this was beyond the state of the art. The Army decided to pursue the "best weapon system that could be developed to meet requirements of the forward area on a liberal time scale" to be available in the 1965 period.

=== FAAD ===
Under the "Forward Area Air Defense" project, the Army began collecting theoretical data on the requirements for a missile-based system in 1959.

Guidance was a major area of concern. Most anti-aircraft missiles of the era used semi-active radar homing, with an "illumination radar" on the ground that reflected signals off the target that were picked up by a small receiver in the missile's nose. This system had the advantage that the radar signal continued to grow in strength as the missile approached the target, making it increasingly easy to track. More importantly, the reflected signal was a cone shape centered on the target, so guidance became increasingly accurate as the missile approached.

On the downside, the SARH concept also meant that any other reflections could confuse the missile's seeker. Since SARH relied on making the seeker in the missile as simple as possible in order to fit into the missile body, it was common for seekers of the era to be easily confused by reflections from trees, buildings or the ground. It was difficult for the missile to distinguish the target in a cluttered environment.

For FAAD, they decided to use a beam riding guidance system. This had been used in early missiles like the RIM-2 Terrier, but had been abandoned in favor of semi-active systems for all of the reasons above. In particular, in the case of beam-riding the signal is shaped like a cone centered on the broadcaster, which means it becomes increasingly inaccurate as the missile flies towards the target. Some sort of secondary terminal guidance system was almost always needed with beam-riding weapons.

In spite of these disadvantages, beam-riding offered FAAD the ability to guide the missiles in close proximity to the ground. Since the guidance signal is received at the rear of the missile body, the signal would remain clear as long as there were no obstructions between the missile and launcher. It was only the launch platform that had to have the ability to distinguish targets from ground clutter, not the missile. FAAD used a continuous wave radar, which uses the Doppler shift of the moving targets to locate them against any sort of background. For terminal guidance, FAAD used an advanced infrared homing system.

Given the quick engagement times, on the order of seconds, the Army decided that FAAD had to have semi-automatic actions. In combat, the operators would select targets on a long-range search radar and then simply say "go" to attack them. The system's fire control computer would slew the weapons and fire automatically as soon as they came in range.

After running Monte Carlo simulations on an IBM 650, they decided to use a blast-fragmentation warhead, deciding that the continuous-rod warhead would be less effective.

For mobility, the system would be based on the M113, the Army's latest APC and one of the more advanced vehicles in the inventory. The modifications needed to support a missile system were relatively simple, and the crew area inside the chassis offered room for the needed equipment. The resulting vehicle was known as the XM-546.

=== Development ===
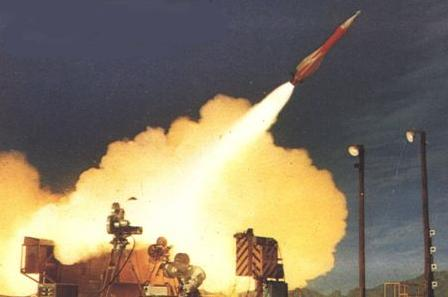
Test launch of Mauler

Several companies responded to the FAAD contract tender, which General Dynamics (Convair Pomona Division) won in 1959. In 1960 the project was given the official name "Mauler". The Mauler development program which was to begin in May 1959 did not get underway until March 1960.

The Army was not the only potential user of the Mauler system; both the British Army and US Navy planned on using Mauler for their own needs. The British Army's intended role was essentially identical to the US's, but the Navy was looking for a solution to the problem of air attack against their capital ships both by high-speed aircraft as well as early (non-skimming) anti-shipping missiles. Starting in 1960 they had developed a program for a "Basic Point Defense Missile System", and intended to use a modified version of the Mauler, the "RIM-46A Sea Mauler", to fill this role. Mauler's beam riding system made it preferable to other missile systems because it would have fewer problems with clutter from the sea. Additionally, its fast-acting semi-automatic fire control was highly desired for a weapon that was expected to counter targets with engagement times under a minute. Expecting its arrival, the Navy's latest destroyer escorts, the Knox class, were built with space reserved for the Sea Mauler launchers when they arrived.

Development was complicated by the diversity of platforms the Mauler system was to be installed upon. A compatible identification friend or foe system (IFF) was a particular problem. Development of the missile airframe and engine progressed rapidly. Unguided examples, known as "Launch Test Vehicles", started firing tests in September 1961. These were quickly followed by the "Control Test Vehicle" guided examples in 1961, which flew simple paths to test the aerodynamic controls. Both test series demonstrated a variety of problems, including failures of the rocket casings, and excessive drag and wing flutter. A competing system with the British and potentially other NATO states was the PT.428 which eventually developed successfully into the Rapier missile.

The first "Guidance Test Vehicle", essentially the service prototypes, started firing in June 1963. These also demonstrated an array of problems, most worrying was the continued tendency to lose guidance instructions immediately after launch. Additionally, when mounted in the 3 by 3 box launcher, the missiles would break their containers and damage the missiles in adjacent containers. Eventually no less than 22 different container materials would be used in an attempt to find a suitable solution.

=== Problems ===
Mauler development was restricted by funding resulting in an Army Ordnance Missile Command recommendation that either funds be acquired from other sources (such as the Navy, Marine Corps or NATO) or that development be stretched out by up to two years. By 1963 funding shortfalls resulted in dependence upon unorthodox methods to keep the program going. Production plans had to be adjusted in 1963 which presented a problem as the M42 Duster system had been retired. Achievement of an operational Mauler capability was out of the question.

The Performance Evaluation & Review Technique (PERT) originally devised for the Polaris system in 1958 was introduced into the Mauler effort in 1962–63. Cagle described the contractor's reaction to PERT as "somewhat less than enthusiastic". In spring 1964 another management revision was introduced and the Mauler Program Management Charter was established. A Feasibility Validation Program had been established in 1963 which was to determine if Mauler could be successfully developed in the time available and at reasonable cost. It was determined that Mauler could engage jets and piston aircraft though at a lesser than desirable range but helicopters were an elusive target.

It was apparent by early 1965 that the Mauler program would be unsuccessful. Inadequate funding, a lack of guidance from higher headquarters, changes in requirements, and unsolved technical problems led to a loss of confidence. The program was cancelled in July 1965 after six years of delays.

=== Cancellation ===
By this point there were serious doubts that the system would be entering service any time soon. On 16 September 1963 the Army Materiel Command asked the Aviation and Missile Command to study adapting the Navy's AIM-9 Sidewinder missile as the basis of a short-range anti-aircraft system. Their analysis suggested that the conversion would be simple, but the missile's long lock-on time and optical guidance would make it ineffective in close combat.

Based on this potential solution to the air defense problem, the Army Staff, supported by the Army Air Defense Artillery School at Fort Bliss, started a new study under the direction of Lieutenant Colonel Edward Hirsch. Known as the "Interim Field Army Air Defense Study", it called for a multi-layer system consisting of an adapted Sidewinder as a missile component known as the MIM-72 Chaparral, a short-range gun component using the M61 Vulcan known as the M163 VADS, and the separate AN/MPQ-49 Forward Area Alerting Radar that would support both by sending digital information to displays in those platforms. All of these would be further supported by the FIM-43 Redeye shoulder-launched missile. Although the resulting composite system would not be nearly as capable as Mauler, it could be in service much sooner and provide some cover while a more capable system developed.

In November 1963 Mauler was re-directed as a pure technology demonstration program. Several modified versions using simpler systems were proposed, but even these would not have entered service before 1969. Tests with the GTVs continued until the entire program was cancelled outright in November 1965. Chaparral adapted the Mauler's IR seeker, which was greatly improved over the versions in the original AIM-9B.

=== Aftermath ===
The Chaparral/Vulcan combination was always intended to be a stop-gap solution while a more powerful system evolved. However, in the 1970s the threat was perceived to change from tactical aircraft to missile-firing helicopters that would "pop-up" from behind cover. This suggested the use of a fast-acting gun system, albeit one with much longer range than the Vulcan's 1,200 m. Out of these studies came the "Division Air Defense" concept that was eventually filled by the M247 Sergeant York. This program ran into serious technical problems of its own, and was eventually cancelled in 1985.

After the Sergeant York was cancelled, the Army joined forces with the Canadian Forces to develop a new system. The result was the Oerlikon Contraves-designed ADATS, which is very similar to the original Mauler in form, function and even the launch platform, an adapted M113. ADATS is somewhat more capable than Mauler, however, with ranges up to 10 km and higher missile speeds. However, the ending of the Cold War led the Army to cancel their ADATS purchase, leaving the Chaparral/Vulcan combination in service even longer. The anti-aircraft role was eventually filled by the Bradley Linebacker, based on the short-range FIM-92 Stinger.

The cancellation also left the British Army without a defense system, but they had prepared for this eventuality, having had several US missile systems cancelled out from under them in the past. Before selecting the Mauler, the British Aircraft Corporation had been working on a private project known as "Sightline", and continued its development as a low priority while the Mauler program progressed. On its cancellation, Sightline was given full development funds, and entered service in 1971 as Rapier with a tracked mobile version following in 1981.

The US Navy was in a somewhat more troubling position. In addition to their need to replace guns and existing missile systems like the RIM-24 Tartar, they were also looking to replace short-range gun systems on their older ships. Mauler was "built-in" not only to their latest ship designs, like the Knox, but formed the basis for their entire anti-aircraft concept for the 1970s. It was believed that Mauler would greatly improve the capabilities of smaller ships, allowing them to take on some of the roles that would normally require a much larger platform, like a full destroyer.

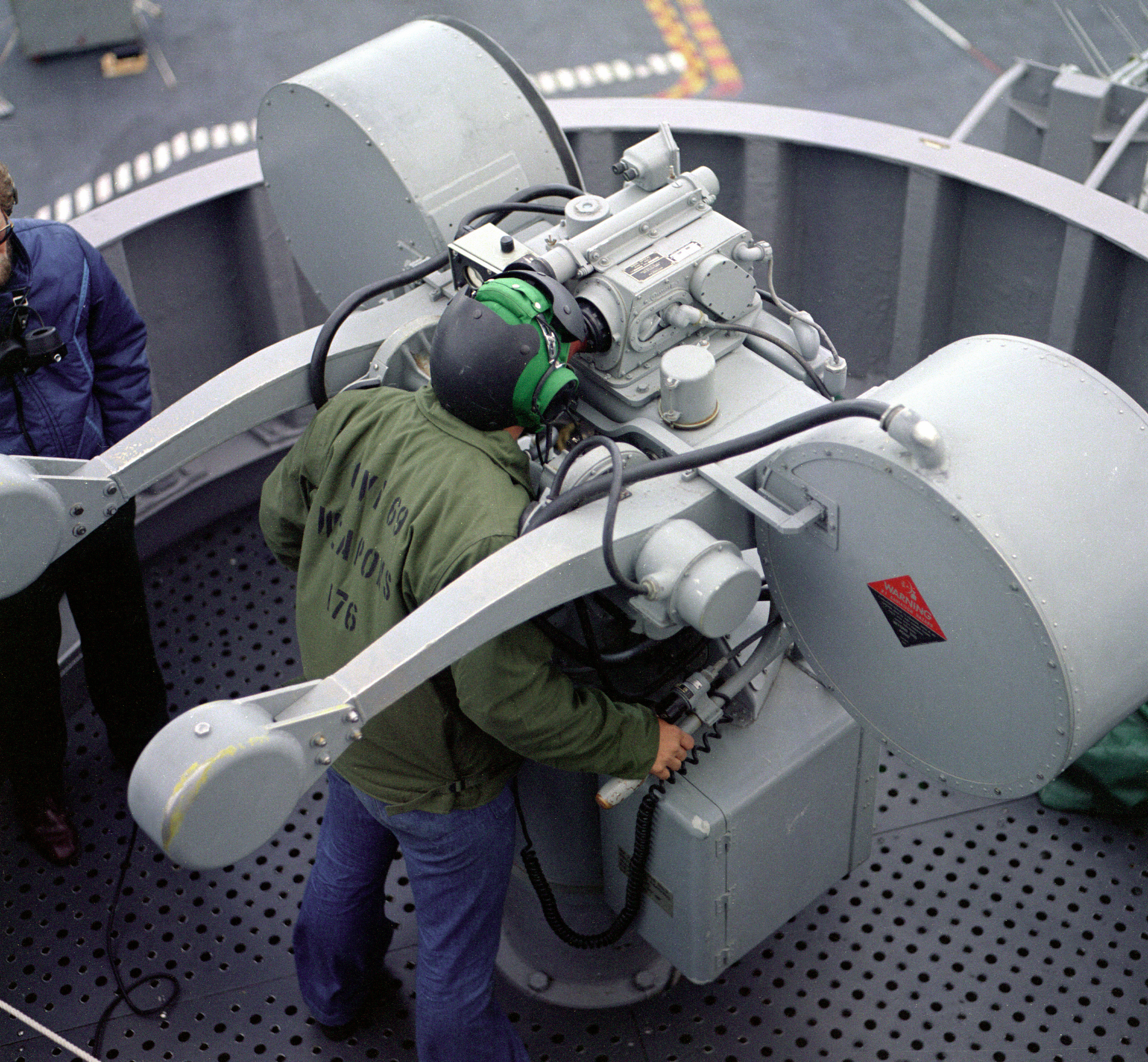
An RIM-7 Sea Sparrow radar illuminator.

With Mauler's cancellation, the Navy had to start a crash program to develop a suitable system. As the infrared-guided Sidewinder would be of limited use against aircraft or missiles approaching head-on, they were forced to use the AIM-7 Sparrow instead. Although the Sparrow was a capable missile, it was intended for launch from high-speed aircraft and thus had relatively low acceleration, trading this for longer cruising time and range. An entirely new motor was developed for the new RIM-7 Sea Sparrow. To guide it, a new manually controlled radar illuminator was developed, guided by an aimer standing between two large radar dishes that looked somewhat like searchlights. The ship's search radars would send target information via voice channels to the operator, who would slew the illuminators onto the target and launch the missiles. The missiles were held in a large eight-cell rotating launcher that was slaved to the illuminator in order to allow the seeker to see the reflected signal. The system, as a whole, was much larger than Mauler, had shorter range, and much longer reaction times.

In spite of the Sea Sparrow's relative simplicity, it was quickly upgraded. The use of folding mid-mounted wings allowed the launcher cells to be greatly reduced in size, and an automatic tracking system was soon added to the radar illuminator system. This was again upgraded to allow the phased-array radars of modern ships to guide the Sparrow directly, removing the need for the relatively large illuminators. The evolution continued with the latest models, which can be vertically launched from four-cell containers, greatly expanding the number that can be carried on most ships. What started as a quick-and-dirty solution to the hole left by the Mauler evolved into a system of even greater capability.

== Description ==
The General Dynamics Mauler system used a large A-frame mounted on the top of the vehicle that contained a phased array continuous wave search radar at the top, the smaller tracking/illumination radar on one side, and a large box containing nine missiles between the "legs". The entire system was mounted at the back of the XM546 "Tracked Fire Unit" on a rotating platform that allowed the missiles to be pointed toward the target. Before launch the protective cover over the missile's canister was popped off to allow the infrared seeker to see the target, and then it was launched into the illuminating radar's beam.

Raytheon provided both the search and illumination radars, while Burroughs provided the fire control system. The missile itself was 6 feet (1.8 m) long, 5 inches (130 mm) in diameter, had a 13 inches (330 mm) fin span, and weighed 120 pounds (54 kg). It had a maximum range of 5 miles (8.0 km) and ceiling of 20,000 feet (6,100 m), powered by a Lockheed solid-fuel motor of 8,350 pounds-force (37,100 N).
