= AN/SQS-35 =

US Navy towed sonar system

The AN/SQS-35 was a United States Navy surface ship independent, towed variable depth sonar system (IVDS) developed by the Naval Underwater Sound Laboratory the EDO Corporation.

== Capabilities ==
The AN/SQS-35 could function under 3 primary modes, with 'search' and 'attack' (active) and 'listen' (passive) modes available to it. The sonar system utilized 3 target displays, two PPIs and a classification recorder, and provided ships mounted with the towed array with the capability to search the 13 kHz high-frequency band at variable depths, including below the layer or depths of up to 180 meters. The sonar could maintain a maximum power output of 30 kW and a range of 12,000 yards (11 km).

== Variants ==
- SQS-35J - Japanese produced version
- SQS-36 - Hull Mounted version
- SQS-38 - Solid-State version

== Specifications ==
- Operating frequency: 13 kHz
- Peak frequency: 14.1 kHz (SQS-36)
- Array height: 1.6 metres (5 feet 3 inches)
- Array diameter: 4.8 metres (15 feet 9 inches)
- Beams: 12 preformed RDT beams

== Ships ==
The AN/SQS-35 and its variants were mounted in the U.S. Navy's Knox Class Frigates, the U.S. Hamilton-class coast guard cutters, as well as the JMSDF's Shirane and Takatasuki class destroyers.

== See also ==
- AN/SQS-26
