= AN/SPG-53 =

Military ship gun fire-control system

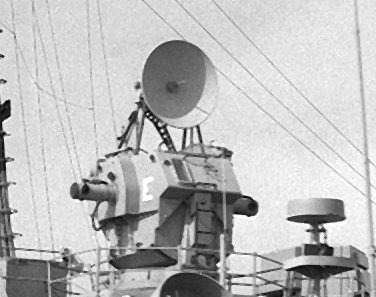
- Mark 68 GFCS director with AN/SPG-53 radar antenna on top.
- Country of origin: United States
- Type: Gun fire-control
- Range: 120,000 yd (59 nmi)
- Precision: Fire control quality, three-dimensional data
- Power: 250kW (SPG-53A)

The AN/SPG-53 was a United States Navy Gun Fire-control radar (International Telecommunication Union classification: radiolocation land station in the radiolocation service), used in conjunction with the Mark 68 gun fire-control system.

It was used with the 5"/54 caliber Mark 42 gun system aboard Belknap-class cruisers, Mitscher class, Forrest Sherman class, Farragut class and Charles F. Adams-class destroyers and Knox-class frigates of the US Navy, as well as Australian Perth-class destroyers and Spanish Baleares-class frigates.

In accordance with the Joint Electronics Type Designation System (JETDS), the "AN/SPG-53" designation represents the 53rd design of an Army-Navy electronic device for waterborne fire control radar system. The JETDS system also now is used to name all Department of Defense electronic systems.

== See also ==
- List of radars
- List of military electronics of the United States
