= Bras d'Or (disambiguation) =

Bras d'Or Lake, the name of which means arms of gold or golden arms, is a saltwater lake on Cape Breton Island.

Bras d'Or can also refer to:

== Places ==
- Bras d'Or, Nova Scotia, Canada; a community in Nova Scotia
- Little Bras d'Or, Nova Scotia, Canada; a community in Nova Scotia
- Big Bras d'Or, Nova Scotia, Canada; a community in Nova Scotia
- Bras d'Or (electoral district), in Nova Scotia, Canada
- Bras d'Or Lakes Scenic Drive, on Cape Breton, Nova Scotia, Canada

== Vehicles ==
- Bras d'Or (train), the Halifax–Sydney passenger train
- HMCS Bras d'Or, several Canadian warships
  - HMCS Bras d'Or (auxiliary minesweeper) was an auxiliary minesweeper (1919-1940)
  - HMCS Bras d'Or (R-103), a British built experimental hydrofoil renamed HMCS Baddeck (R-103)
  - HMCS Bras d'Or (FHE 400), a Canadian prototype hydrofoil of the Canadian Forces
- HMS Bras d'Or
  - HMS Bras d'Or (R-103), a British built Royal Navy experimental hydrofoil entered into Royal Canadian Navy service

== Other uses ==
- The plural of "Bra d'Or" (Golden Bra), awards presented by the Playwrights Guild of Canada
