= David Ouellet =

David Ouellet may refer to:

- David George Ouellet (1944–1967), American naval seaman
- David Ouellet (politician) (1908–1972), Canadian Member of Parliament
- David Ouellet (architect) (1844–1915), Canadian architect and wood carver
