= Réal Bouvier =

Réal Bouvier (January 6, 1946 – January 9, 2000) was a Canadian navigator and a Quebec journalist.

In 1977, he crossed the Northwest Passage, from east to west, in command of JE Bernier II, a sailing boat of 10.5 meters. The JE Bernier II remains the smallest vessel to have made the crossing in one season and the first sailing boat to have circumnavigated North America, a journey of 18,500 nautical miles.

JE Bouvier did not complete the northwest passage in one season as the passage is only completed upon reaching the Pacific. Not to mention that Bouvier also wintered on passage in Greenland. Thus the voyage took three seasons not one.

== Early life ==
Bouvier was born on January 6, 1946, in Longueuil, Quebec, on Montreal's south shore.

== Journalism career ==
Réal Bouvier started off his journalism career as a contributor to the Quartier latin at the Université de Montréal. He later became a journalist at Le Soleil in Quebec City, at La Voix de l'Est in Granby and at the Montreal dailies La Presse and Le Devoir. Bouvier later became a columnist specializing in boating, notably in the maritime journals Québec Yachting et L'Escale.

== The JE Bernier II ==
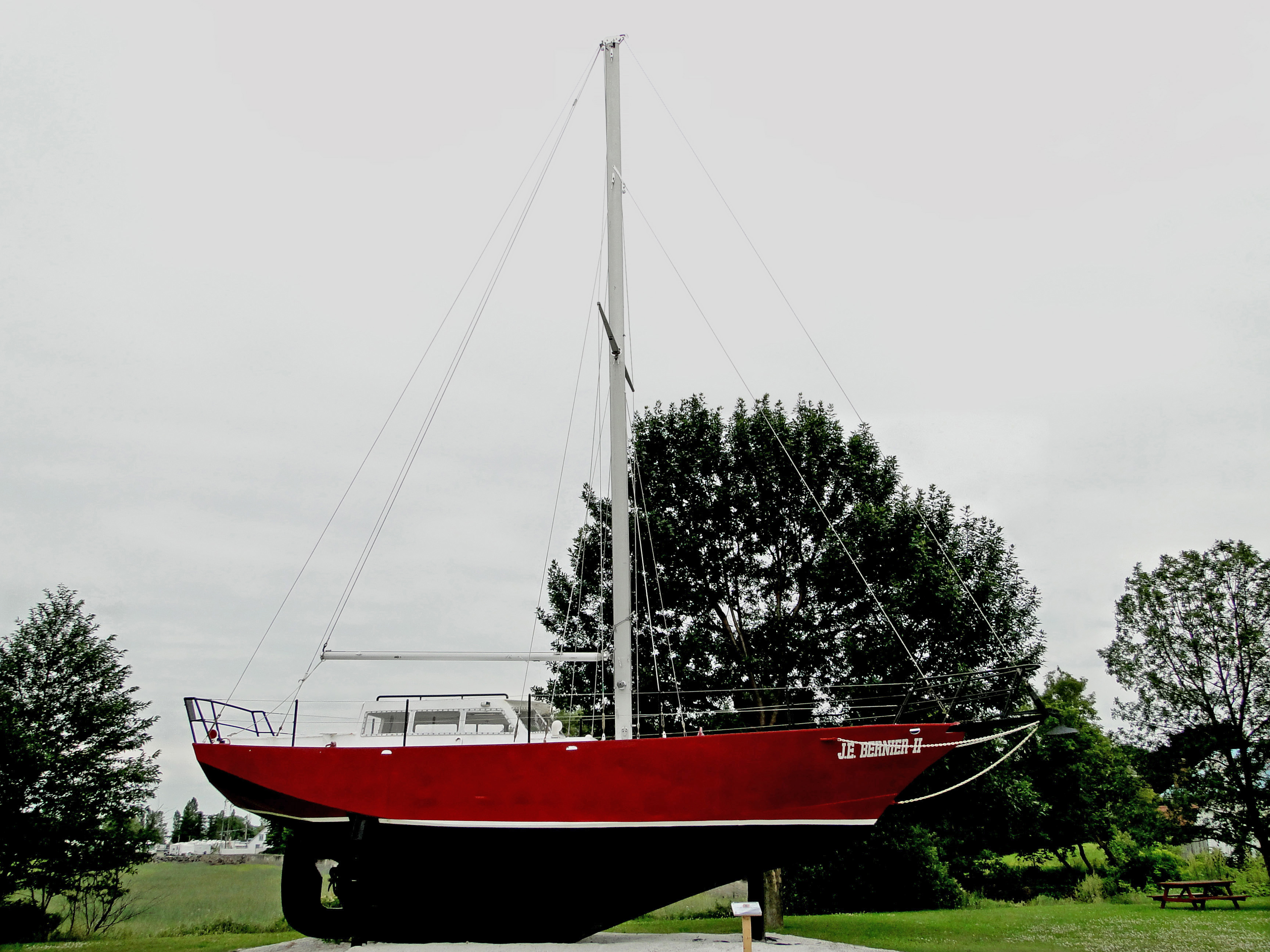
The J.E.Bernier II at the Musée maritime du Québec.

In 1975, he had the J.E. Bernier II built by Fercraft Marine in Côte-Sainte-Catherine. It was a 10.5 metres (34 ft) long steel cutter and built according to the plans of Robert Dufour, the naval architect who designed the Corbin 39 shortly after. The J.E. Bernier II features a lily to the point of halyard of its mainsail, has a displacement of 9.9 tonnes (22,000 lb), a draft of 1.52 metres (5.0 ft) and has a Volvo Penta diesel motor of 36 hp.

Réal Bouvier left Lachine on June 30, 1976, began sailing 74° North, with the goal of crossing the Northwest Passage. His journey was made possible by many sponsors, the primary one being Canada Steamship Lines. Bouvier was assisted in this journey by Marie-Ève Thibault, photographer, Jacques Pettigrew, filmmaker, Pierre Bédard, geologist and Marc Paquet, James Gray, Cinematographer, Yves Desbiens and Lee Brock.

In the winter of 1976 Lancaster Strait was covered by ice, forcing the crew to spend the winter in Holsteinsborg, Greenland. The yacht resumed its journey on Wednesday, June 25, 1977, and met a sailboat from the Netherlands, the Williwaw, led by Willy de Roos and Jean-Louis de Gerlache. Both crews decided to join efforts to reach Baffin Bay.

Bouvier was slowed, and finally stopped in the Strathcona Fjord to engineer a new propeller shaft and transmission at the Nanisivik mine in Nunavut. He subsequently reached Beechey Island, where the tombstones of members of the Franklin Expedition of 1845 are situated. Two routes were then opened to him: the southern route used by Roald Amundsen in 1905, and the northern route used by the supertanker SS Manathan in 1969. Bouvier opted for the south and sailed through Peel Sound on August 23, 1977, to pass within 400 miles (640 km) of the North Pole. He passed through Pasley Bay, where, in 1942, Henry Larsen wintered aboard the St. Roch. Then Bouvier successively reached Gjöa Bay on Simpson Strait and Queen Maud Gulf. He finally reached Cape Bathurst on September 10 and entered the Beaufort Sea.

The J.E. Bernier II wintered in Tuktoyaktuk and raised the sails again in mid-July 1978. The Bering Strait was crossed on August 30, 1978. Bouvier reached Vancouver on October 15 after traveling 9,800 nautical miles. Finally, he sailed southward, passing through the Panama Canal and returned to Quebec via the Atlantic Ocean and St. Lawrence River.

Since 1979, the J.E. Bernier II has been preserved at the Musée maritime du Québec in L'Islet in the Chaudière-Appalaches region.

Details of his expedition, along with his other writings, were published in La Presse between 1976 and 1979.

== Honours ==
In 2001, the Longueuil marina was renamed Marina Port-de-Plaisance Réal-Bouvier.
