= HMCS Bras d'Or =

HMCS Bras d'Or is a name used by the Royal Canadian Navy and Canadian Forces MARCOM for several ships, named after Bras d'Or Lake.

- HMCS Bras d'Or (1919), auxiliary minesweeper (1939–1940)
- Bras d'Or (R-103), experimental hydrofoil (1957–1962)
- HMCS Bras d'Or (FHE 400), prototype hydrofoil (1968–1971)
