= Phutthayotfa Chulalok-class frigate =

Thai class of ship

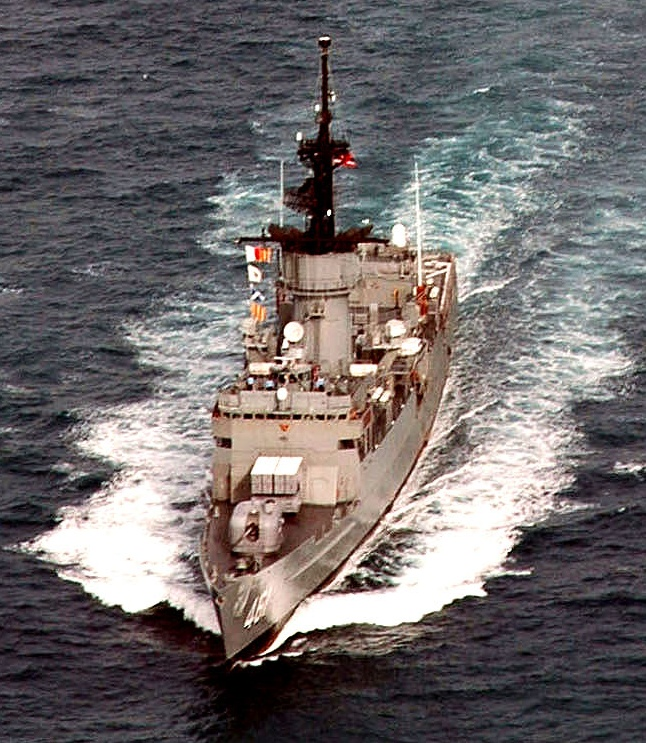
- Lead ship of the class, HTMS Phutthayotfa Chulalok in 2005

Class overview
- Builders: Avondale Shipyards, Westwego, Louisiana
- Operators: United States Navy ex-Knox-class frigate; Royal Thai Navy
- Preceded by: Chao Phraya class
- Succeeded by: Naresuan class
- Built: 1969–1974
- In commission: 1994–2017
- Retired: 2
- Preserved: 1

General characteristics
- Type: Frigate
- Displacement: 4,065 long tons (4,130 t) (standard); 4,260 long tons (4,328 t) (full load)
- Length: 438 ft (134 m) loa; 415 ft (126 m) wl
- Beam: 46 ft 9 in (14.25 m)
- Draft: 24 ft 9 in (7.54 m)
- Installed power: 2 × 1,200 psi (8,300 kPa) boilers; 35,000 shp (26,099 kW)
- Propulsion: 1 × geared steam turbine; 1 × shaft
- Speed: 27 kn (50 km/h; 31 mph)
- Complement: 250 officers and enlisted
- Sensors & processing systems: SPS-40B 2-D air search radar; SPG-53 fire control radar; SQS-26CX bow sonar; SQR-18 towed sonar; SLQ-32(V)1 passive intercept
- Armament: 1 × 5"/54 caliber Mark 45 gun; 1 × 20 mm Phalanx CIWS; 8 × ASROC anti-submarine missiles; 4 × Harpoon missiles; 4 × Mk.32 torpedo tubes with Mark 44 torpedoes
- Aviation facilities: Helicopter deck and hangar

The Phutthayotfa Chulalok-class frigates are two of forty-six Knox-class frigates originally laid down for the United States Navy as ocean escorts (formerly called destroyer escorts), but were all redesignated as frigates on 30 June 1975, in the USN 1975 ship reclassification and their hull designation changed from DE to FF. The Thai Navy acquired them between 1994 and 1996.

== Description ==
The Phutthayotfa Chulalok class are 438 ft (134 m) long overall and 415 ft (126 m) at the waterline, with a beam of 46 ft 9 in (14.25 m) and a draft of 24 ft 9 in (7.54 m), at a standard displacement of 4,065 long tons (4,130 t) and 4,260 long tons (4,328 t) at full load. The steam plant for these ships consists of two Combustion Engineering boilers each equipped with a high-pressure (supercharger) forced draught air supply system, with a plant working pressure of 1,200 psi (8,300 kPa) and 1,000 °F (538 °C) superheat and rated at 35,000 shaft horsepower (26,000 kW) driving a Westinghouse geared turbine connected to a single screw. This gives them a speed of 27 kn (50 km/h; 31 mph).

As built, they were equipped with one 5-inch (127 mm)/54 caliber Mark 42 gun forward, an eight-round ASROC launcher (with 16 missiles carried) abaft the gun and forward of the bridge, with four fixed 12.75 in (324 mm) Mark 32 anti-submarine torpedo tubes. A helicopter deck and hangar for operating the DASH drone helicopter was fitted aft. The helicopter facilities were expanded in the 1970s to accommodate the larger, crewed Kaman SH-2D Seasprite LAMP helicopter.

== Service history ==
USS Ouellet and USS Truett were purchased by Thailand in 1996 and 1999. Thailand had initially leased Truett in 1994. Following refits and a service life extensions costing some $14 million each, Ouellet and Truett were commissioned by the Royal Thai Navy as Phutthaloetla Naphalai (FFG-462) and Phutthayotfa Chulalok (FFG-461).

In 2013, it was reported that the ships of this class would be retired, Phutthayotfa Chulalok in 2015, and Phutthaloetla Naphalai in 2017.

== Ships of the class ==
Original name	New name	New hull number	Builder	Laid Down	Commissioned US Navy	Decommissioned US Navy	Purchased by Royal Thai Navy	Decommissioned by Royal Thai Navy
Truett (FF-1095)	Phutthayotfa Chulalok	FFG 461	Avondale Shipyards, Westwego, Louisiana	27 April 1972	1 June 1974	30 July 1994	9 December 1999	1 April 2015
Ouellet (FF-1077)	Phutthaloetla Naphalai	FFG 462	Avondale Shipyards, Westwego, Louisiana	15 January 1969	12 December 1970	6 August 1993	27 November 1996	26 September 2017

=== Phutthayotfa Chulalok ===
Phutthayotfa Chulalok (Thai: พุทธยอดฟ้าจุฬาโลก). The ship is named after the first king of the Chakri Dynasty, King Phutthayotfa Chulaok the Great.

The Royal Thai Navy first leased the ship from the US Navy after she was decommissioned on 30 July 1994. The ship was eventually purchased on 9 December 1999.

=== Phutthaloetla Naphalai ===
Phutthaloetla Naphalai (Thai: พุทธเลิศหล้านภาลัย). The ship is named after the second king of the Chakri Dynasty, King Phutthaloetla Naphalai

The Royal Thai Navy purchased the ship from the US Navy after she was decommissioned on 6 August 1993. The ship subsequently underwent a US $14M refit at the Cascade General Shipyard, Portland, Oregon, and arrived in Thailand in 1998.

== Bibliography ==
- "Knox class - Anti-submarine warfare frigate". Archived from the original on 29 October 2017.
- "Cascade General Begins Work on Ship Conversion for Thai Navy". Cascade General. 28 July 1997. Archived from the original on 28 June 2008.
- Gardiner, Robert; Chumbley, Stephen, eds. (1995). Conway's All The World's Fighting Ships 1947–1995. Annapolis, Maryland: Naval Institute Press. ISBN 1-55750-132-7.
- Blackman, Raymond V. B., ed. (1971). Jane's Fighting Ships 1971–72. London: Sampson Low, Marston & Co., Ltd. ISBN 0-354-00096-9.
- Moore, John, ed. (1985). Jane's Fighting Ships 1985–86. London: Jane's Yearbooks. ISBN 0-7106-0814-4.
- "USS Truett (DE 1095)". NavSource. 20 May 2017.
- "USS Ouellet (DE 1077)". NavSource. 12 July 2017.
- "Navy awaits cabinet nod for new frigate". Bangkok Post. 30 July 2013.
