= David Ouellet (architect) =

Canadian architect

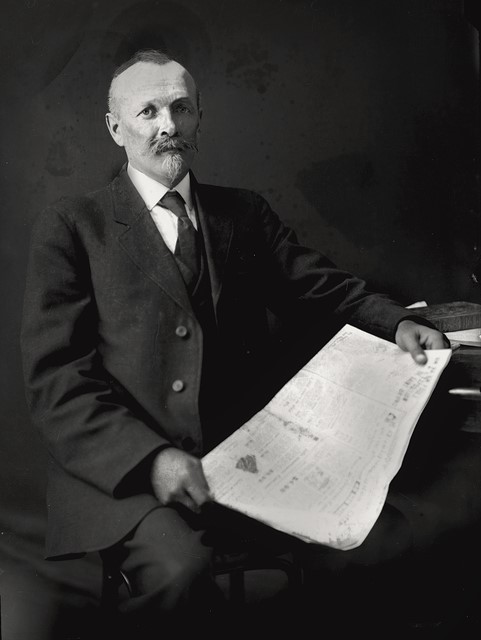
- David Ouellet, October 1917
- Born: September 15, 1844; Malbaie, Lower Canada
- Died: July 14, 1915 (aged 70); Quebec City, Canada
- Occupations: Architect, wood carver
- Years active: 1876–1914
- Spouse: Emma Laforme (m. 1884–1915)

David Ouellet (1844–1915) was a Canadian architect and wood carver. He was one of Quebec's leading architects in the late 19th and early 20th centuries, but because of his traditional training contributed little to the architectural revival in Quebec. Though his work focused mainly on churches, he also designed secular structures.

== Early life and education ==
David Ouellet was born in Malbaie, Lower Canada, on September 15, 1844, to Édouard Ouellet and Marie Lebel. He began studying at Collège de Sainte-Anne-de-la-Pocatière in 1856 and continued his studies there for the next eight years. After leaving the college, François-Xavier Berlinguet trained him as an architect. Ouellet was also an apprentice carver to Louis Jobin around the same time. Ouellet drew up a relief map of Sainte-Anne-de-la-Pocatière under the tutelage of Abbé Pierre Stanislas Vallée for which he received an honourable mention at the 1867 Universal Exposition in Paris. Ouellet returned to Quebec City in the 1870s after spending some time in Montreal. He was partnered with an ornament making gilder named Louis Alméras from 1874 to 1876 where he learned ornamentation methods of design. Beginning in 1876, Ouellet became a practising architect in Quebec and opened his offices in his home along with his wood carving studio operations.

== Career ==
=== Religious architecture ===
Ouellet trained traditionally for his job as an architect. He began his architectural career in Rivière-Ouelle building a church in the town. He recognised that new places of worship were required to meet the needs of a growing population and followed the lead of his mentors Berlinguet and Vallee. He set up a business to produce churches. He would plan and design the building, supervise the builder as it was constructed and complete the interior decoration. He designed his projects so that rural labourers, unfamiliar with innovative methods, could do the work. His sketches, detailed estimates and his architectural plans could be understood by both the client and the builder. Ouellet designed plans for churches in modules and used traditional methods of construction with interchangeable components. This allowed his clients to select the architecture and effects in a range of prices. Ouellet had an extensive library and studied innovations in form and technique as the Art Nouveau influence on the Cap-Santé church altar in 1877 shows. That same year he created one of his most successful works, the partially renovated church in Saint-Thomas.

Ouellet was responsible for the construction or remodelling of about 250 churches in a nearly thirty-year span between 1876 and 1905. In 1881, he helped construct a 210 foot (64 metres) steeple on the church of Saint-Lazare but it was eventually torn down.

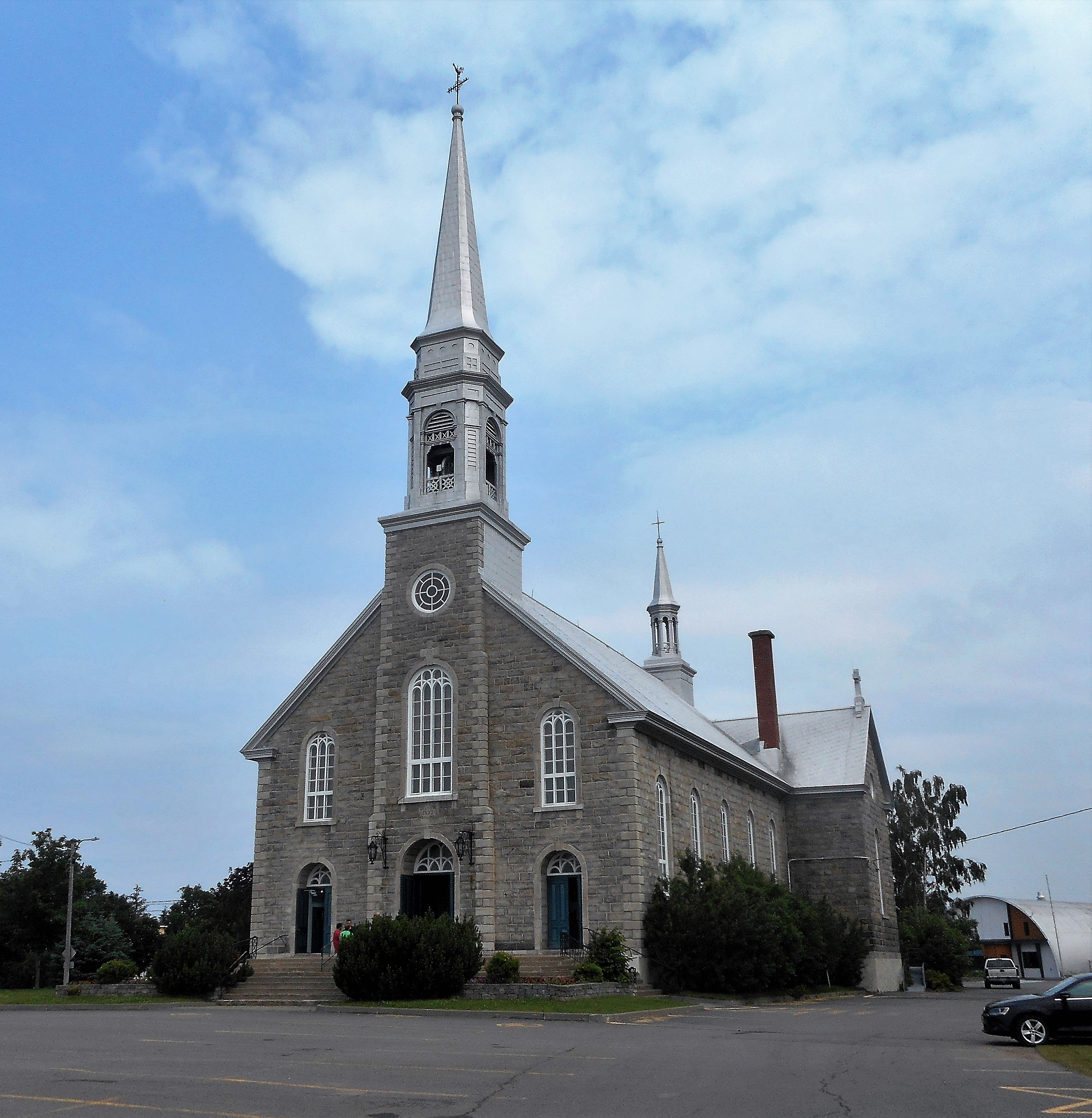
N-D-de-Liesse, Rivière-Ouelle

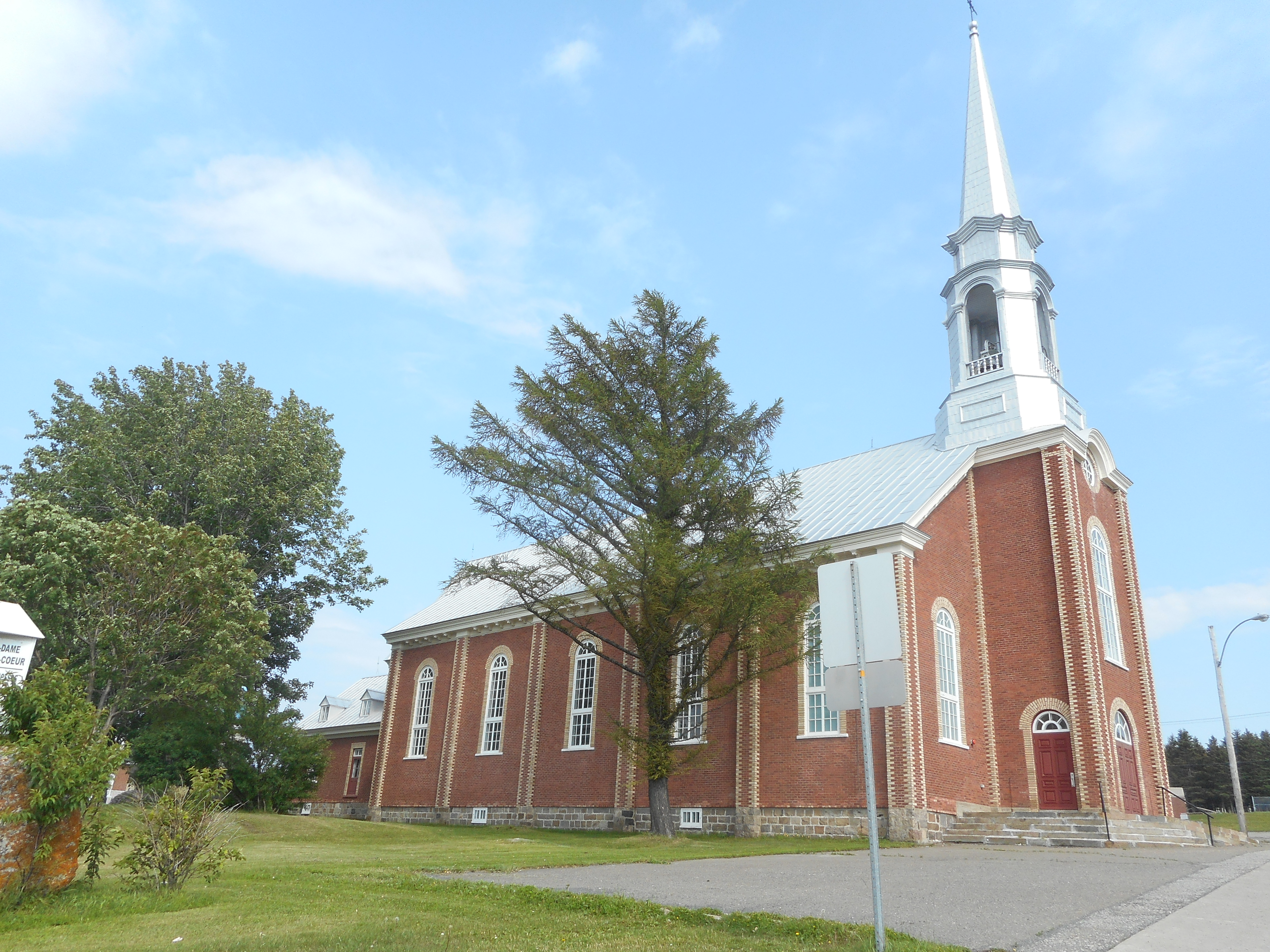
N-D-du-Sacré-Cœur, Rimouski

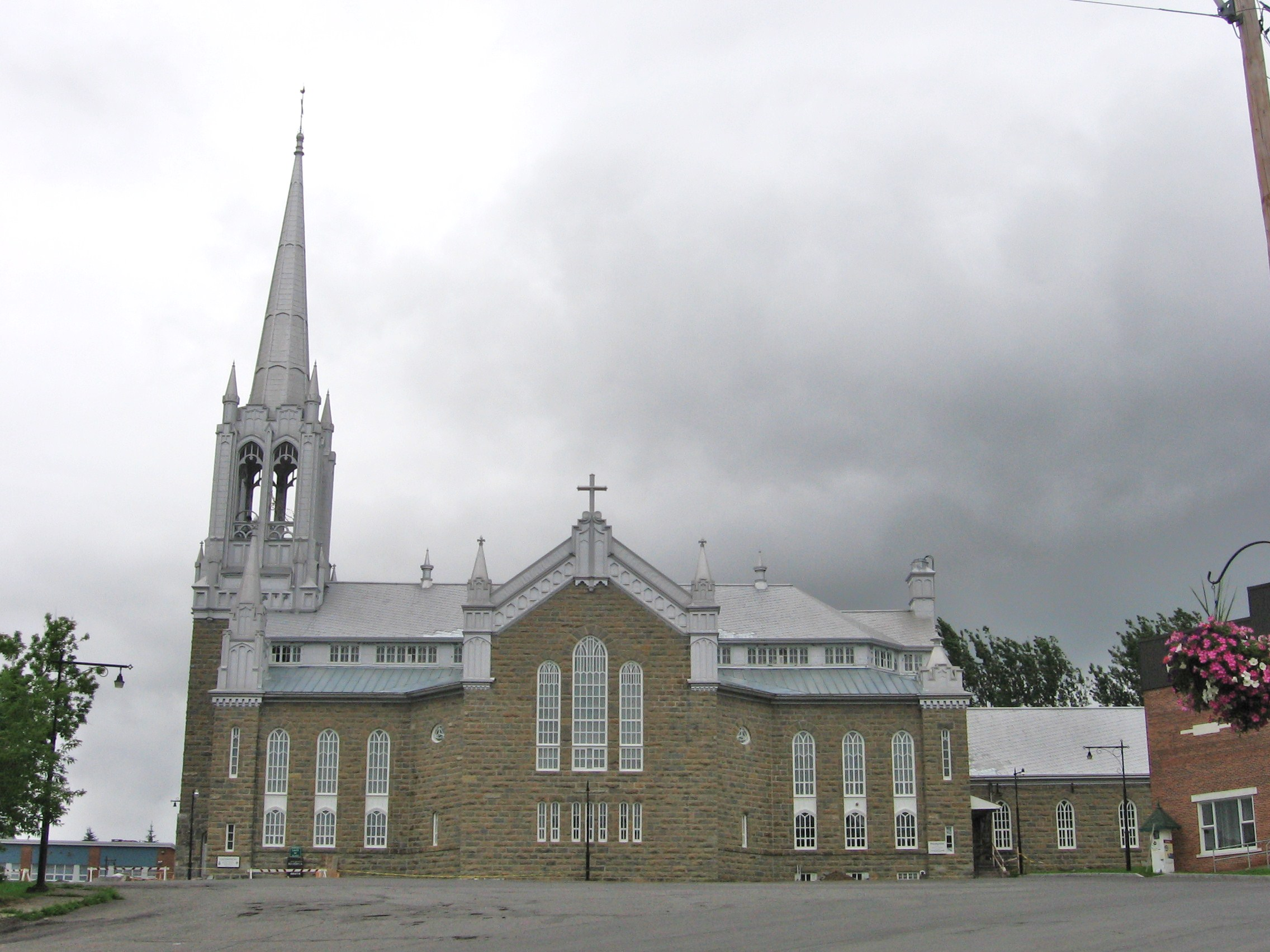
Saint-Jacques-le-Majeur, Causapscal

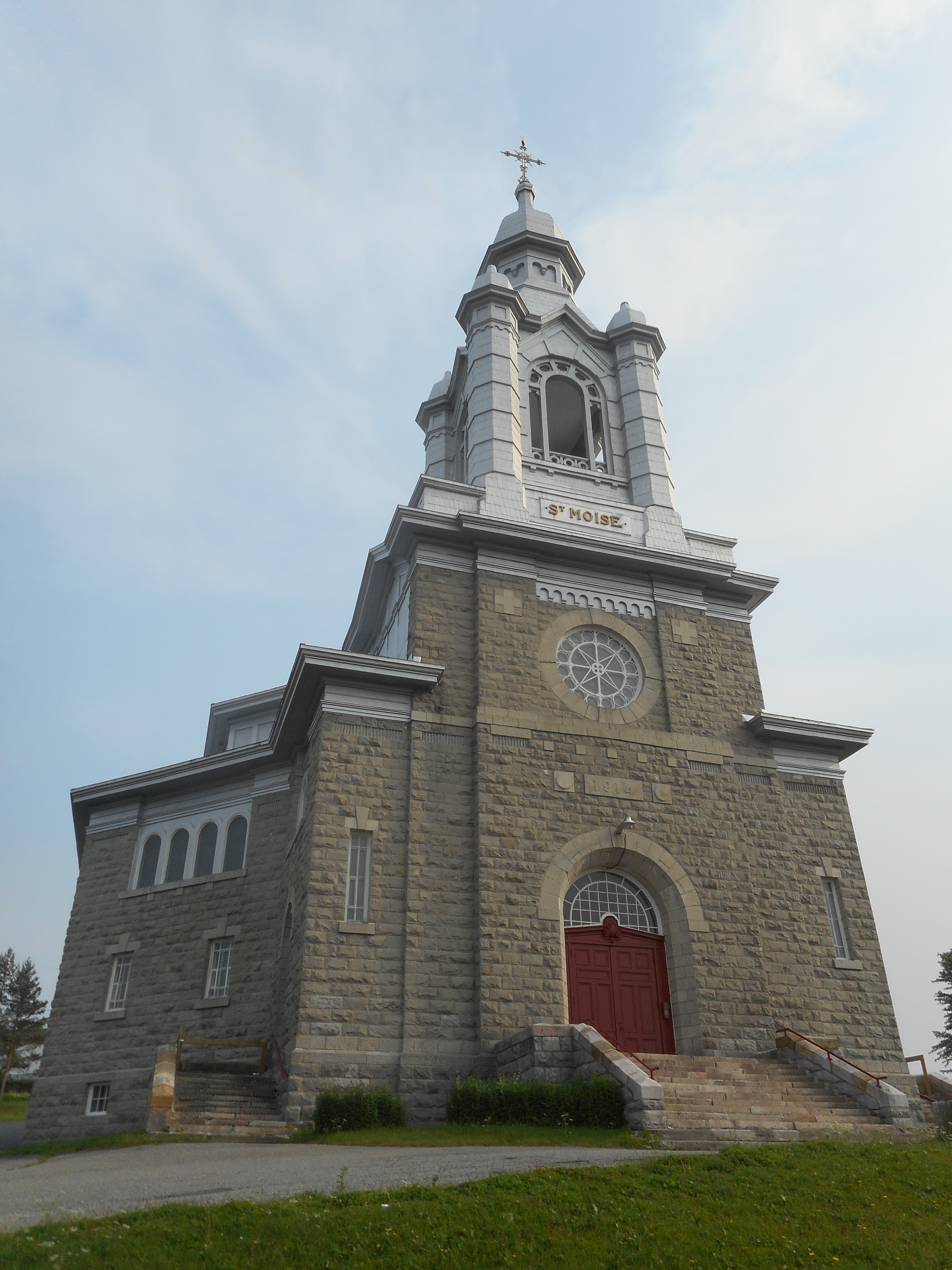
Saint-Moïse

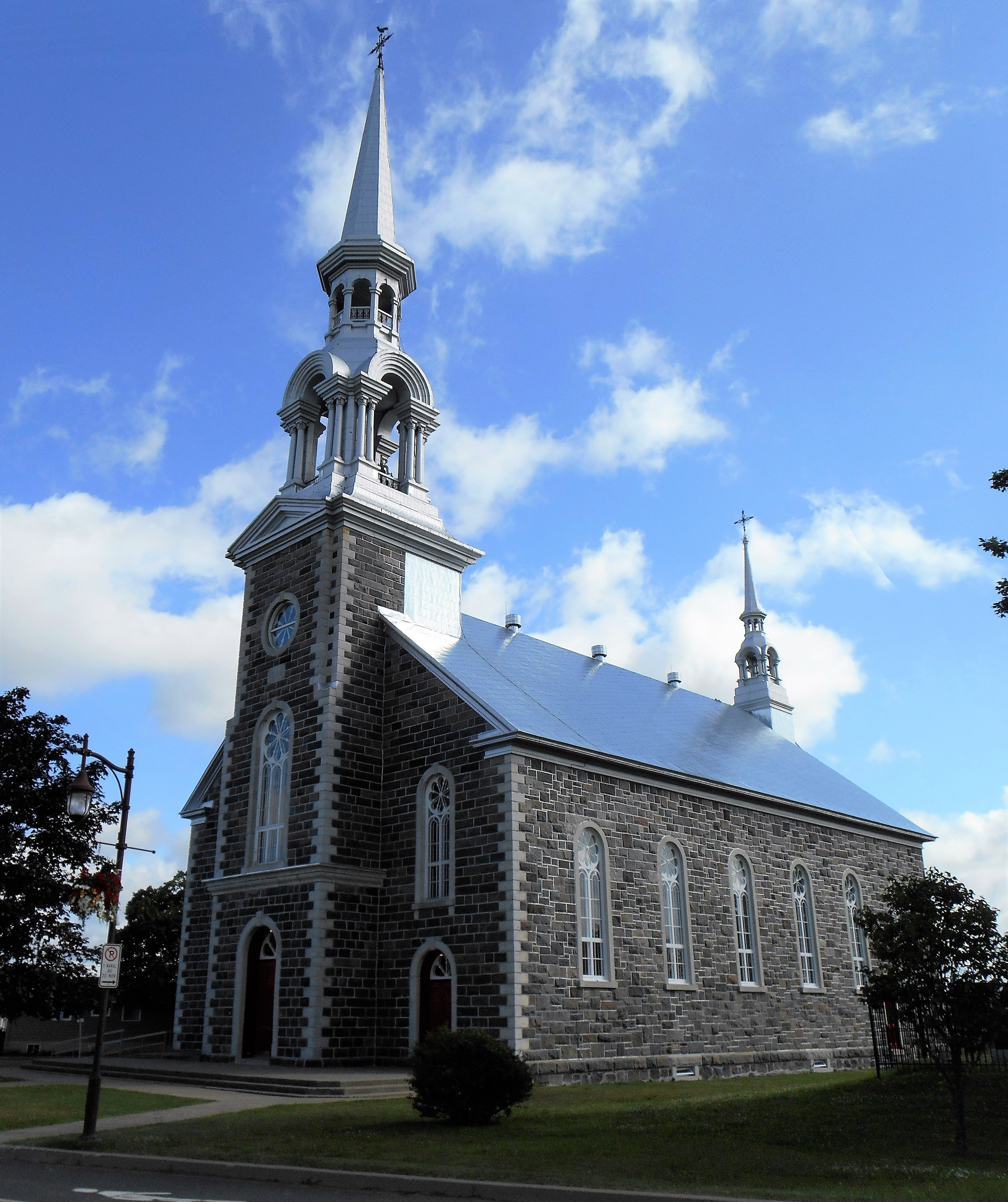
Saint-Flavien

In 1882, Ouellet was commissioned to renovate the church of Notre-Dame-de-Bon-Secours in Islet. His next few works were the steeples for Kamouraska in 1883, the Hospice de la Misericorde at Quebec in 1887 and the aqueduct for the Hospice St. Joseph de la Deliverance in Lévis, Quebec, a few years later. Ouellet next designed the steeples in Saint-Antoine-de-Tilly in 1901. From 1889 to 1891, he worked with his son-in-law and apprentice, Joseph-Georges Bussières. Nine years later, he formed the architectural firm Ouellet and Lévesque with his adopted son, Pierre Lévesque. The two architects designed the church of Notre-Dame-du-Mont-Carmel (1906), in Bas-Saint-Laurent, and the church of Notre-Dame-de-l'Annonciation (1907), in Ancienne-Lorette. In 1914 Ouellet helped renovate the facades of churches in Saint-Leon-le-Grand and Sainte-Luce. Ouellet was a charter member of the Province of Quebec Association of Architects. He also worked on churches in Saint-Philippe-de-Néri, Saint-Eugène-de-l'Islet and the Ursuline Monastery.

=== Secular architecture ===
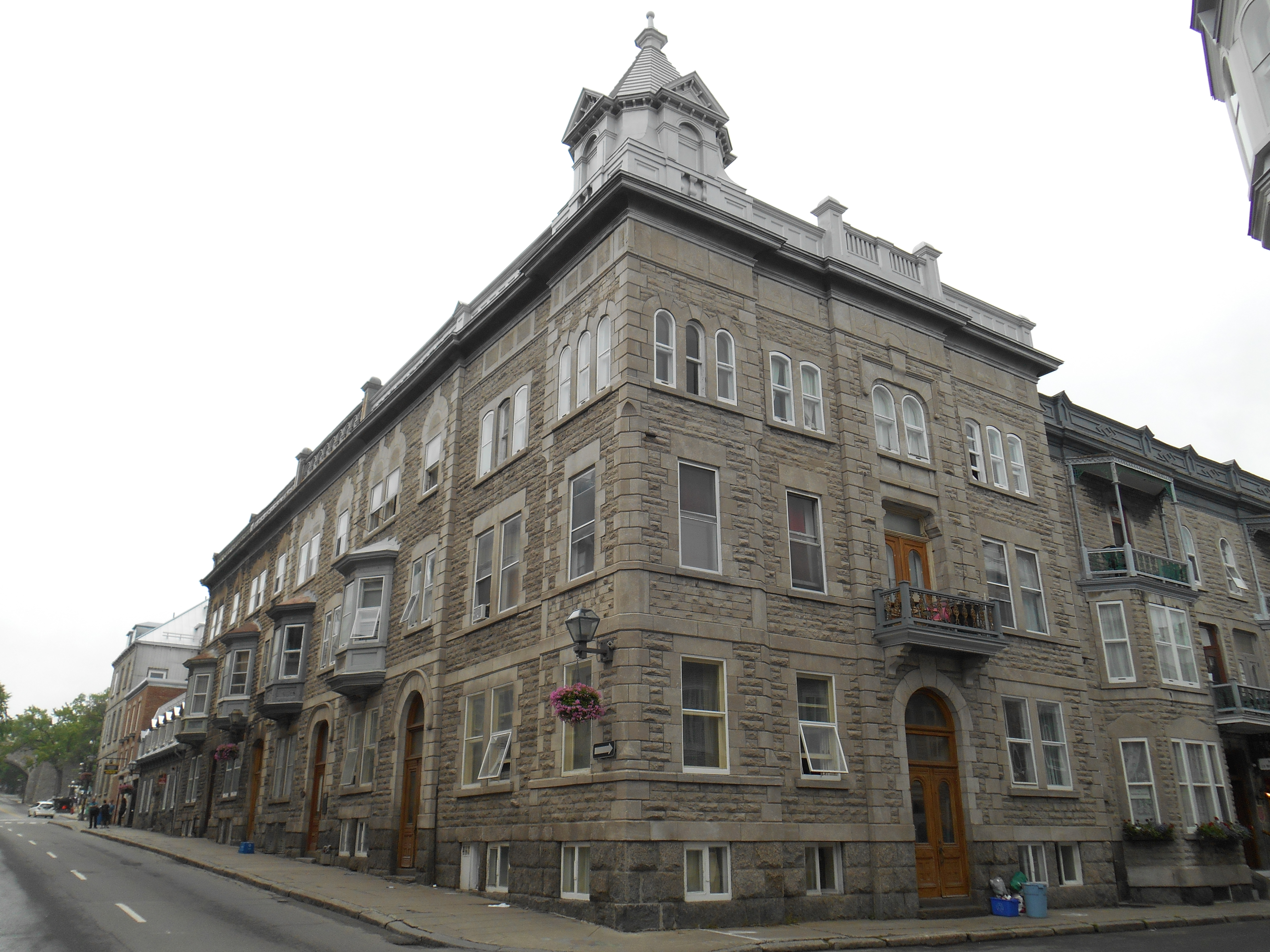
Alexandre Chauveau row houses

Ouellet was not particularly affected by the external wave of influence which lead to Quebec's architectural revival. Most of the work was religious architecture for churches outside major cities or urban areas. His rare non-religious styled work includes the interiors of the Maison Terreau Racine in Rue des Remparts, and his design of judge Alexandre Chauveau's row houses in Rue Sainte-Ursule which do, however, resemble presbyteries.

=== Political career ===
Unlike his rival architects, Ouellet had little interest in politics; his only involvement was when he became an alderman in Montcalm (since annexed by Quebec City) in 1911. He was chairman of the roads and waterworks committee.

== Style ==
Ouellet used polychromy, exaggerated dimensions, and architecture that met the needs of a growing clergy within his Victorian and Neo Gothic architectural designs. Ouellet kept the spirit of grandeur by removing screened facades from older churches and replacing them with newer, more noticeable ones. Some examples of these types of designs are Ouellet's work on the Notre Dame de Bon Secours church in L'Islet in 1882, which was one of Ouellet's earliest commissioned works. He combined panelling with rough stones, corner armatures and hewn stoned foundations forming textures and contrasts which were both diverse and colourful. Ouellet displayed a full array of attention seeking geometric planes during an eighteen-year span beginning in 1883 and culminating with his Saint Antoine de Tilly church work in 1901. Soon after, Ouellet began a change to create more distinctive, picturesque facades giving up the classically rigid style of his earlier works in the process. His new style sought inspiration from bosses and classic ornaments that were colourfully rich in shapes and textures. Ouellet's eclectic style is seen in the façades of the churches of Saint-Léon-le-Grand (1914) near Louiseville and Sainte-Luce (1914) near Saint-Germain-de-Rimouski (Rimouski). Ouellet's style also included elements of neoclassicism which were incorporated into his work on the L'Eglise St. Pierre, Cheticamp (Saint Peter's Catholic Church) in Nova Scotia.

Ouellet improved church furniture like pews with his distinctive style. He used more progressive methods and durable materials which cost less. Ouellet had many apprentices and students during his career, including Montreal architect Charles Bernier.

== Personal life ==
Ouellet married Emma Laforme in 1884 and they had two adopted children. Ouellet's son in law, Joseph Georges Bussieres, was one of his apprentices. Bussieres designed the Portneuf region similar in style to Ouellet's designs. Ouellette died on July 14, 1915, in Quebec.
