= HTMS Phutthayotfa Chulalok =

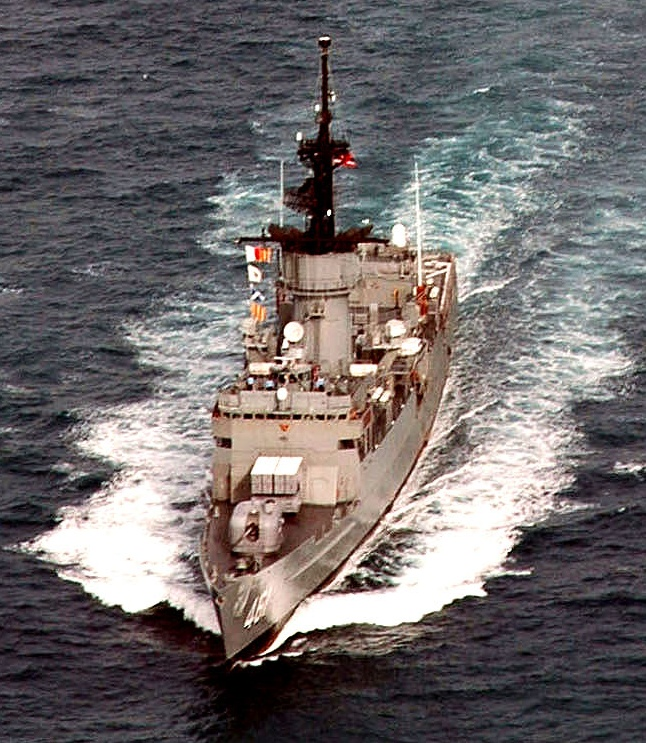
- HTMS Phutthayotfa Chulalok in 2005

History

Thailand
- Name: HTMS Phutthayotfa Chulalok
- Namesake: King Buddha Yodfa Chulaloke (Rama I)
- Builder: Avondale Shipyard, Bridge City, Louisiana
- Laid down: 27 April 1972
- Launched: 3 February 1973
- Acquired: Leased 1994, purchased 9 December 1999
- Commissioned: 30 July 1994
- Decommissioned: 30 September 2017
- Status: Museum ship in Sattahip Naval Base, Sattahip, Chonburi, Thailand
- Badge

General characteristics
- Class & type: Phutthayotfa Chulalok-class frigate
- Displacement: 4,065 long tons (4,130 t)
- Length: 438 ft (134 m)
- Beam: 47 ft (14 m)
- Draft: 25 ft (7.6 m)
- Propulsion: Steam turbine; 2 × 1,200 psi boilers; 1 geared turbine; 1 shaft; 35,000 shp (26,099 kW)
- Speed: 27 knots (31 mph; 50 km/h)
- Complement: 250 officers and enlisted
- Sensors & processing systems: SPS-40B 2-D air search radar; SPG-53 fire control radar; SQS-26CX bow sonar; SQR-18 towed sonar; SLQ-32(V)1 passive intercept
- Armament: 8 × ASROC anti-submarine missiles; 4 × Harpoon missiles; 4 × Mk.32 torpedo tubes with Mark 44 torpedoes; 1 × 5"/54 caliber Mark 45 gun; 1 × 20 mm Phalanx CIWS
- Aviation facilities: Helicopter deck and hangar

HTMS Phutthayotfa Chulalok (FFG-461) (Thai: เรือหลวงพุทธยอดฟ้าจุฬาโลก) is the former USS Truett (FF-1095), Knox-class frigate. The ship is named after the first king of the Chakri Dynasty, King Phutthayotfa Chulaok the Great.

The Royal Thai Navy first leased the ship from the US Navy after she was decommissioned on July 30, 1994. The ship was eventually purchased on December 9, 1999. A Phutthayotfa Chulalok-class frigate, she has a sister ship, the HTMS Phutthaloetla Naphalai (FFG 462).

On 22 September 2020, HTMS Phutthayotfa Chulalok is converted into a floating museum at Sattahip Naval Base in Sattahip District.

== Gallery ==
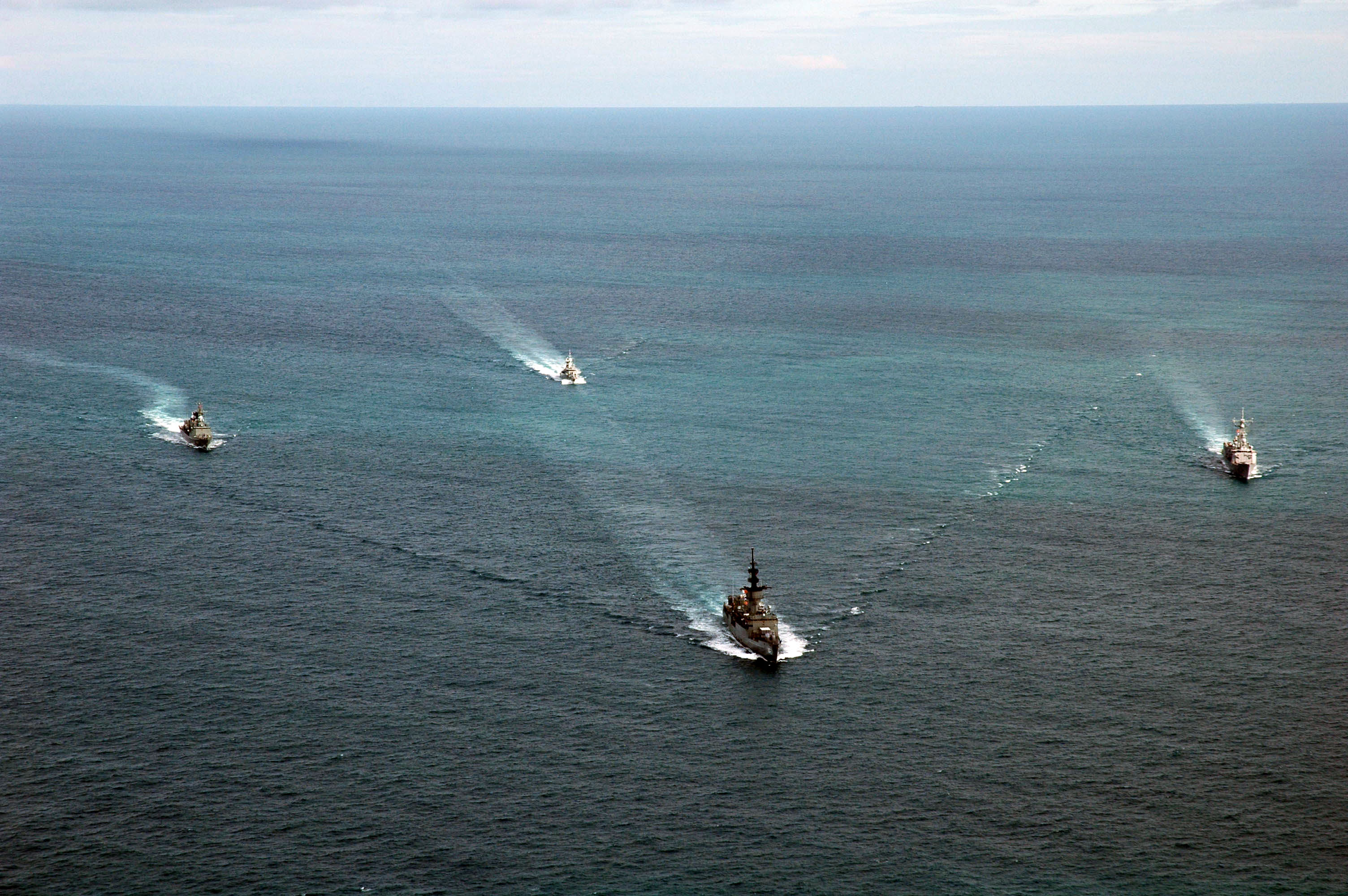
USS Rodney M. Davis (FFG 60) with HTMS Phutthayotfa Chulalok (front)

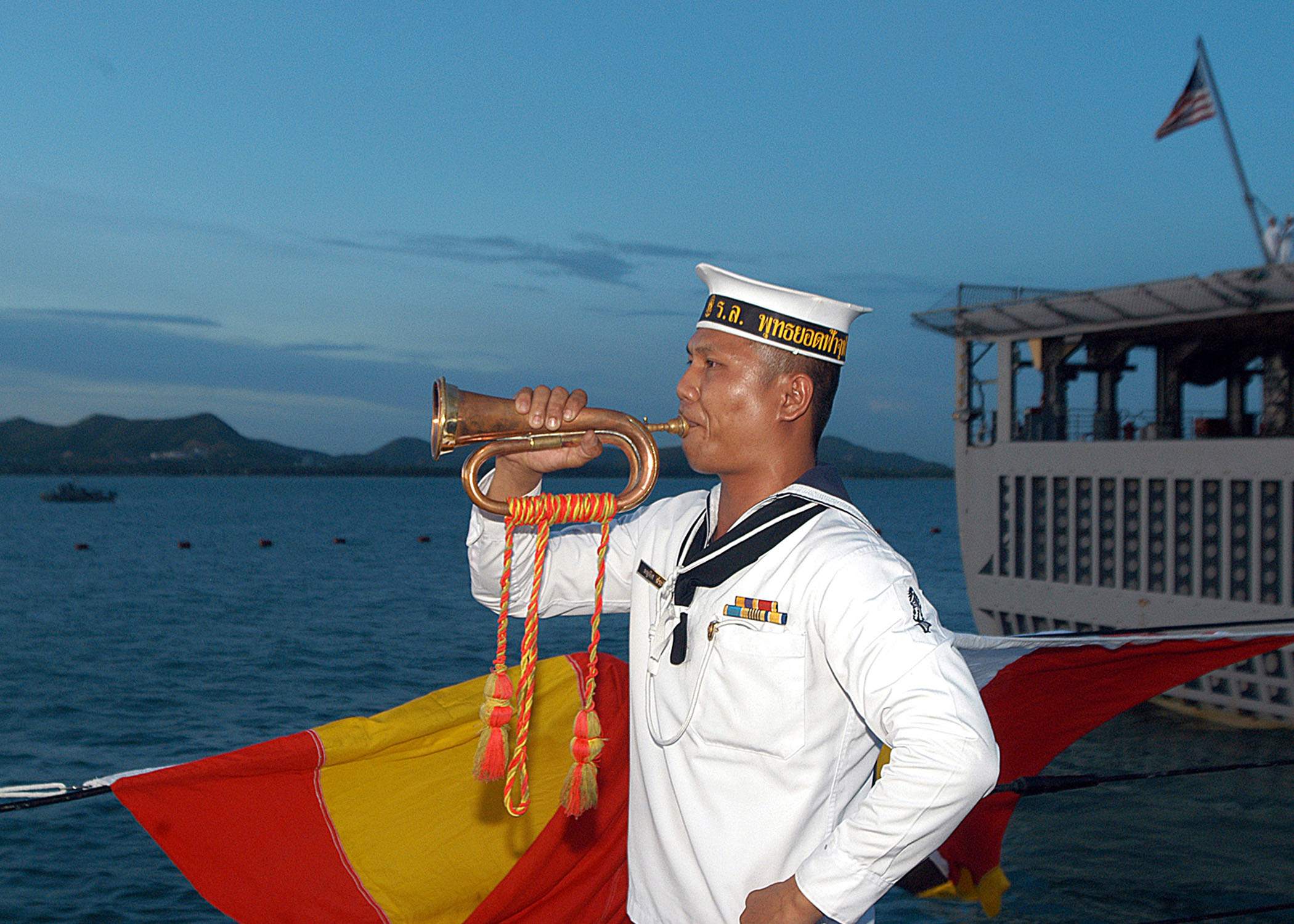
Royal Thai Navy bugler aboard HTMS Phutthayotfa Chulalok sounds a call marking evening colors
