= CCGS Ernest Lapointe =

Coordinates: 47.129057°N 70.372197°W

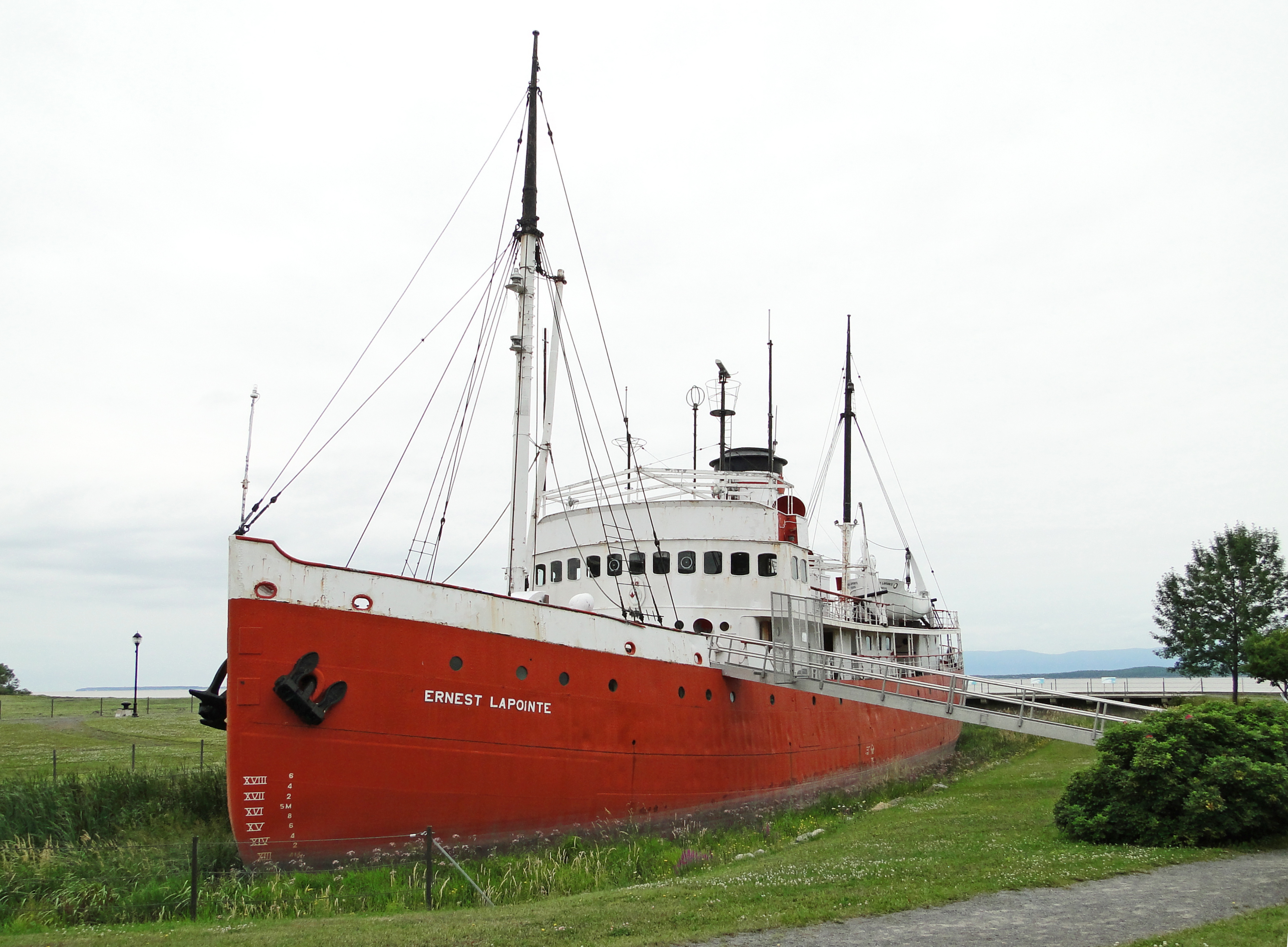
- Former CCGS Ernest Lapointe serving as a museum ship

History

Canada
- Name: Ernest Lapointe
- Namesake: Ernest Lapointe
- Operator: Canadian Coast Guard
- Port of registry: Montreal, Quebec
- Ordered: 1939
- Builder: Davie Shipbuilding, Lauzon
- Yard number: 514
- Launched: 25 November 1939
- Completed: February 1941
- Decommissioned: 1978
- Home port: Trois-Rivières, Quebec
- Identification: IMO number: 5105829
- Status: Museum ship since 1980

General characteristics
- Type: Light icebreaker
- Tonnage: 1,179 GRT; 415 DWT
- Displacement: 1,675 long tons (1,702 t) full load
- Length: 172 ft (52.4 m)
- Beam: 36 ft (11.0 m)
- Draught: 16 ft (4.9 m)
- Propulsion: Compound steam reciprocating engine, 2,000 ihp (1,491 kW); 2 × shafts
- Speed: 13 knots (24 km/h)

CCGS Ernest Lapointe (Note: CCGS stands for Canadian Coast Guard Ship) was a Canadian Coast Guard light icebreaker that served for 37 years. Completed in 1941, Ernest Lapointe was taken out of service in 1978. The ship was active along the East Coast of Canada and in the Saint Lawrence River. In 1980, the vessel was turned into a museum ship in Quebec.

== Description ==
Ernest Lapointe was a light icebreaker that had a displacement of 1,675 long tons (1,702 t) at full load and a tonnage of 1,179 gross register tons (GRT) and 415 tons deadweight (DWT). The ship was 172 feet (52.4 m) long with a beam of 36 feet (11.0 m) and a draught of 16 feet (4.9 m). The vessel was powered by a compound steam reciprocating engine driving two shafts creating 2,000 indicated horsepower (1,500 kW). This gave the icebreaker a maximum speed of 13 knots (24 km/h). The ship was initially designed to be powered by triple-expansion steam engines. However, during the Second World War, the ship bringing the engines to Canada was sunk in transit. In order to complete the ship, compound engines from tugboats were installed. The ship had two four-cylinder compound engines, each having two high-pressure and two low-pressure cylinders.

== Service history ==
Ernest Lapointe was ordered from Davie Shipbuilding in 1939 and constructed at their yard in Lauzon, Quebec with the yard number 514. The vessel was launched on 25 November 1939, though construction was delayed due to priority given to the corvettes being built at the yard. The ship was completed in February 1941. The vessel was named for a former Minister of Marine and Fisheries, Ernest Lapointe. Entering service during the Second World War, Ernest Lapointe was used to resupply the base at Goose Bay, Newfoundland. The icebreaker also aided N.B. McLean in the Saint Lawrence River.

Following the war, Ernest Lapointe was used primarily in the Saint Lawrence River as an icebreaker and survey vessel. Beginning in 1955 the ship was used for ceremonial occasions. In 1958 Ernest Lapointe carried a delegation to Godthaab, Greenland, and in 1964 was used to re-enact the arrival the Fathers of Confederation into Charlottetown, Prince Edward Island. The ship was taken out of service in 1978 and put up for disposal. In 1980 the vessel was acquired by the Maritime Museum of Quebec for use as a museum ship. The icebreaker was placed in a gravel-filled dock in L'Islet, Quebec.

== Sources ==
- Maginley, Charles D. & Collin, Bernard (2001). The Ships of Canada's Marine Services. St. Catharines, Ontario: Vanwell Publishing Limited. ISBN 1-55125-070-5.
- "Ernest Lapointe (5105829)". Miramar Ship Index.
- Moore, John, ed. (1974). Jane's Fighting Ships 1974–75. New York: Franklin Watts Incorporated. ISBN 0-531-02743-0.
- Pritchard, James (2011). A Bridge of Ships: Canadian Shipbuilding during the Second World War. Montreal, Quebec and Kingston, Ontario: McGill-Queen's University Press. ISBN 978-0-7735-3824-5.
