= USS Ouellet =

Knox class frigate

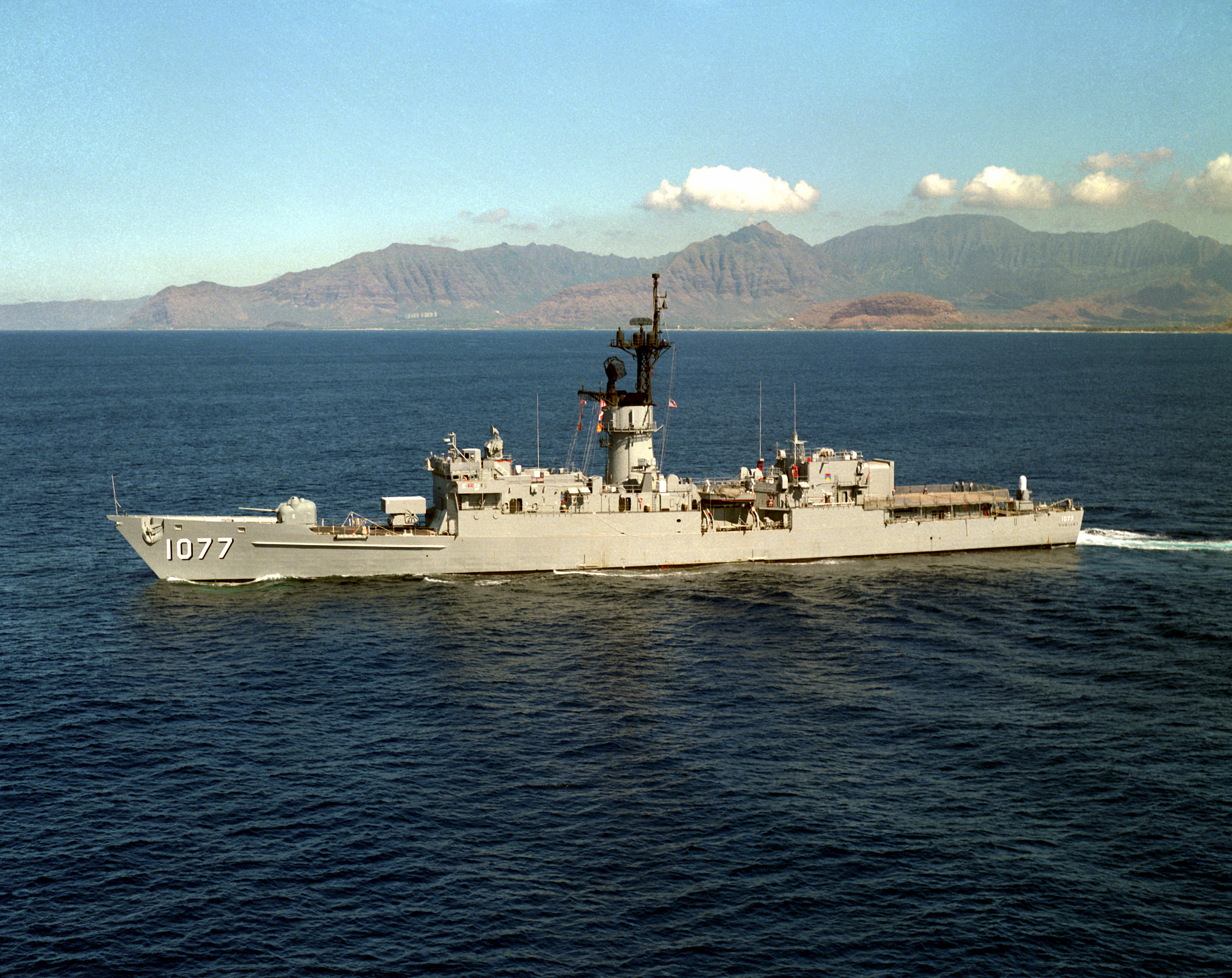
- USS Ouellet (FF-1077)

History

United States
- Name: Ouellet
- Namesake: David George Ouellet
- Ordered: 22 July 1964
- Builder: Avondale Shipyard, Bridge City, Louisiana
- Laid down: 15 January 1969
- Launched: 17 January 1970
- Sponsored by: Mrs. Chester J. Ouellet
- Acquired: 3 December 1970
- Commissioned: 12 December 1970
- Decommissioned: 6 August 1993
- Stricken: 11 January 1995
- Identification: FF-1077; Call Sign = NDNR
- Fate: Transferred to Thailand

General characteristics
- Class & type: Knox-class frigate
- Displacement: 3,232 tons (4,212 full load)
- Length: 438 ft (134 m)
- Beam: 46 ft 9 in (14.25 m)
- Draught: 24 ft 9 in (7.54 m)
- Propulsion: 2 × CE 1200psi boilers; 1 Westinghouse geared turbine; 1 shaft, 35,000 shp (26,000 kW)
- Speed: over 27 knots (50 km/h; 31 mph)
- Complement: 18 officers, 267 enlisted
- Sensors & processing systems: AN/SPS-40 air search radar; AN/SPS-67 surface search radar; AN/SQS-26 sonar; AN/SQR-18 towed array sonar system; Mk68 gun fire control system
- Electronic warfare & decoys: AN/SLQ-32 electronics warfare system
- Armament: 1 x Mk-16 8 cell missile launcher for ASROC and Harpoon missiles; 1 x Mk-42 5-inch/54 caliber gun; Mark 46 torpedoes from four single tube launchers; 1 x Mk-25 BPDMS launcher for Sea Sparrow missiles, later replaced by Phalanx CIWS
- Aircraft carried: 1 x SH-2 Seasprite (LAMPS I) helicopter

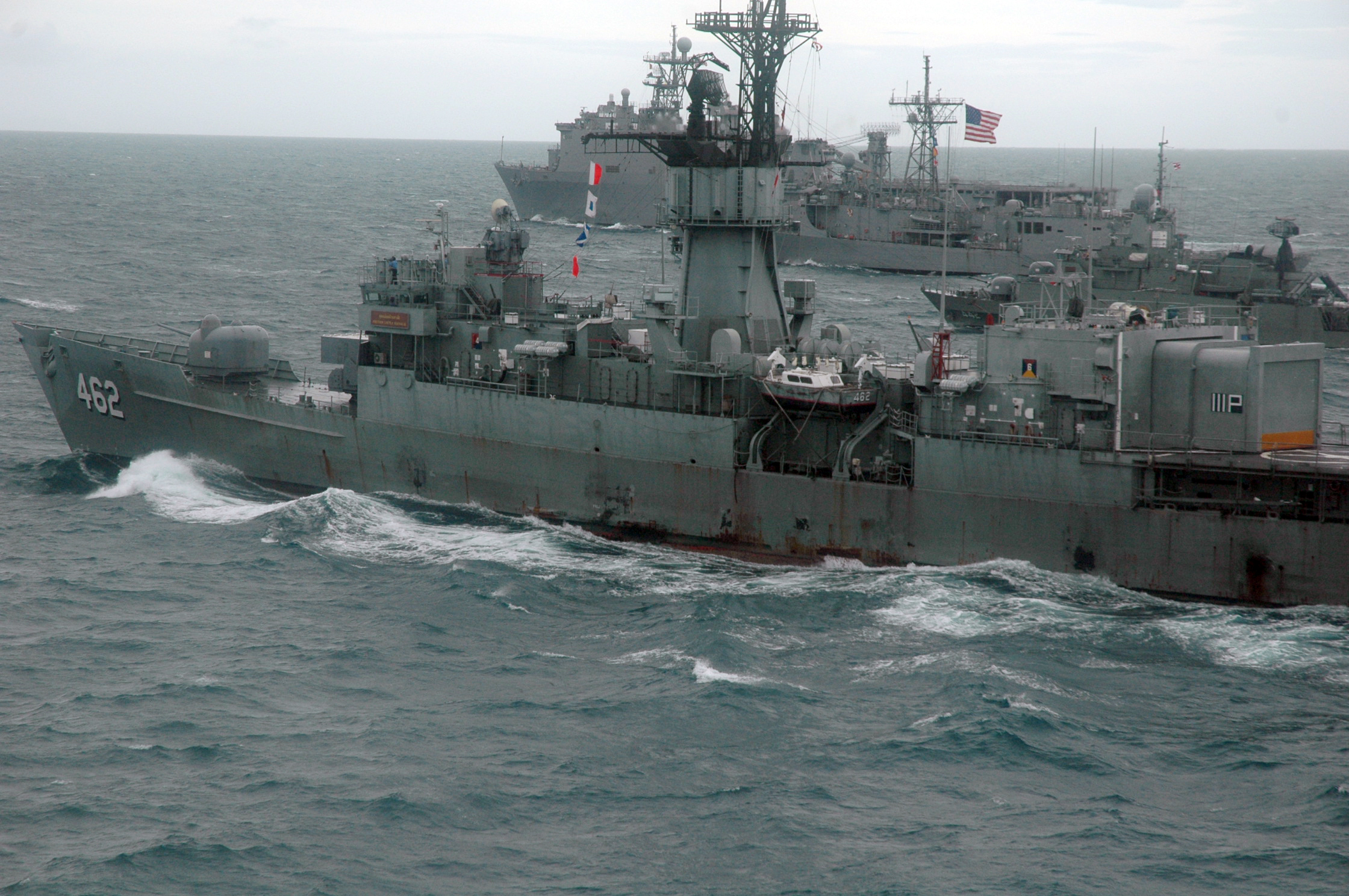
- Phutthaloetla Naphalai in June 2008

History

Thailand
- Name: Phutthaloetla Naphalai
- Namesake: King Buddha Loetla Nabhalai (Rama II)
- Acquired: 27 November 1996
- Commissioned: 1997
- Decommissioned: 1 April 2015
- Identification: F-462

USS Ouellet (FF-1077) was a Knox-class frigate of the United States Navy. Ouellet was the first and only (as of January 2014) ship of the U.S. Navy to bear the name of Seaman David George Ouellet, a posthumous recipient of the Medal of Honor. The vessel was one of a class of frigates specifically designated to locate and destroy enemy submarines. The ship entered service in 1970 and was decommissioned in 1993. Ouellet was sold to Thailand in 1996 and renamed HTMS Phutthaloetla Naphalai.

== Construction and career ==
Ouellet was laid down 15 January 1969 by Avondale Shipyards Inc., Westwego, Louisiana; launched 17 January 1970; sponsored by Mrs. Chester J. Ouellet; and commissioned 12 December 1970.

=== 1970s ===
Ouellet arrived at her homeport in Pearl Harbor, Hawaii on 15 April 1971, with her first deployment to the Western Pacific commencing on 27 January 1972. Ouellet twice came under hostile fire during this deployment, however no casualties were sustained.

During ceremonies re-establishing the U.S. Third Fleet on 1 February 1973, Ouellet became the first Third Fleet flagship since World War II.

Ouellet made her second deployment to the Western Pacific from May through 7 December 1973. She began her first regular overhaul on 14 September 1974, with completion on 3 June 1975. Ouellet was selected as the CINCPACFLT flagship for the U.S. Navy's 200th birthday ceremonies. Ouellet completed two more Western Pacific deployments prior to overhaul in late 1978. Regular overhaul was completed mid-1979 with three Western Pacific deployments to follow commencing September 1980, April 1982, and October 1983 respectively.

=== 1980s ===
Ouellet started the 1980s with the joint exercise RIMPAC in February 1980. In March of that year she headed east to conduct training and deployment work ups with the aircraft carrier Ranger and Battle Group Echo. In September 1980 she deployed with Battle Group 'E' to the Indian Ocean and the Gulf of Oman for the Iranian Crisis.

In May 1982, Ouellet rescued 72 Vietnamese boat people travelling in a sinking fishing boat around 180 nautical miles (330 km) south of Vietnam.

Ouellet began her third major overhaul in February 1985. She received extensive upgrades to her gun mount, received CIWS, and SNAP II computers. In 1986 Ouellet was again preparing for a Western Pacific deployment. Ouellet deployed for her eighth time in April 1987. Ouellet deployed with fellow Pearl Harbor ships Worden and Leftwich to join the Constellation battle group known as "Battle Group Delta". The frigate spent time in Subic Bay, Philippines before transiting the Strait of Malacca on the way to Diego Garcia, BIOT. When USS Stark got hit by an Iraqi Exocet missile in May 1987, the Constellation battle group deployed to the North Arabian Sea, while Ouellet went south to have port visits at Saint-Denis, Réunion – which was a historic visit of sorts as no American Navy ship made a port call there in over 100 years – then off to Port Victoria, Seychelles. The warship then joined the rest of the battle group in the North Arabian Sea in support of Operation Earnest Will. Ouellet was detached from Battle Group Delta and proceeded with Cochrane with port visits to Phuket, Thailand and Singapore. The frigate then detached from Cochrane and proceeded to Subic Bay, RPI where she had a 3-week stay before the battle group caught up and proceeded home with her. She returned to Pearl Harbor on 6 October 1987.

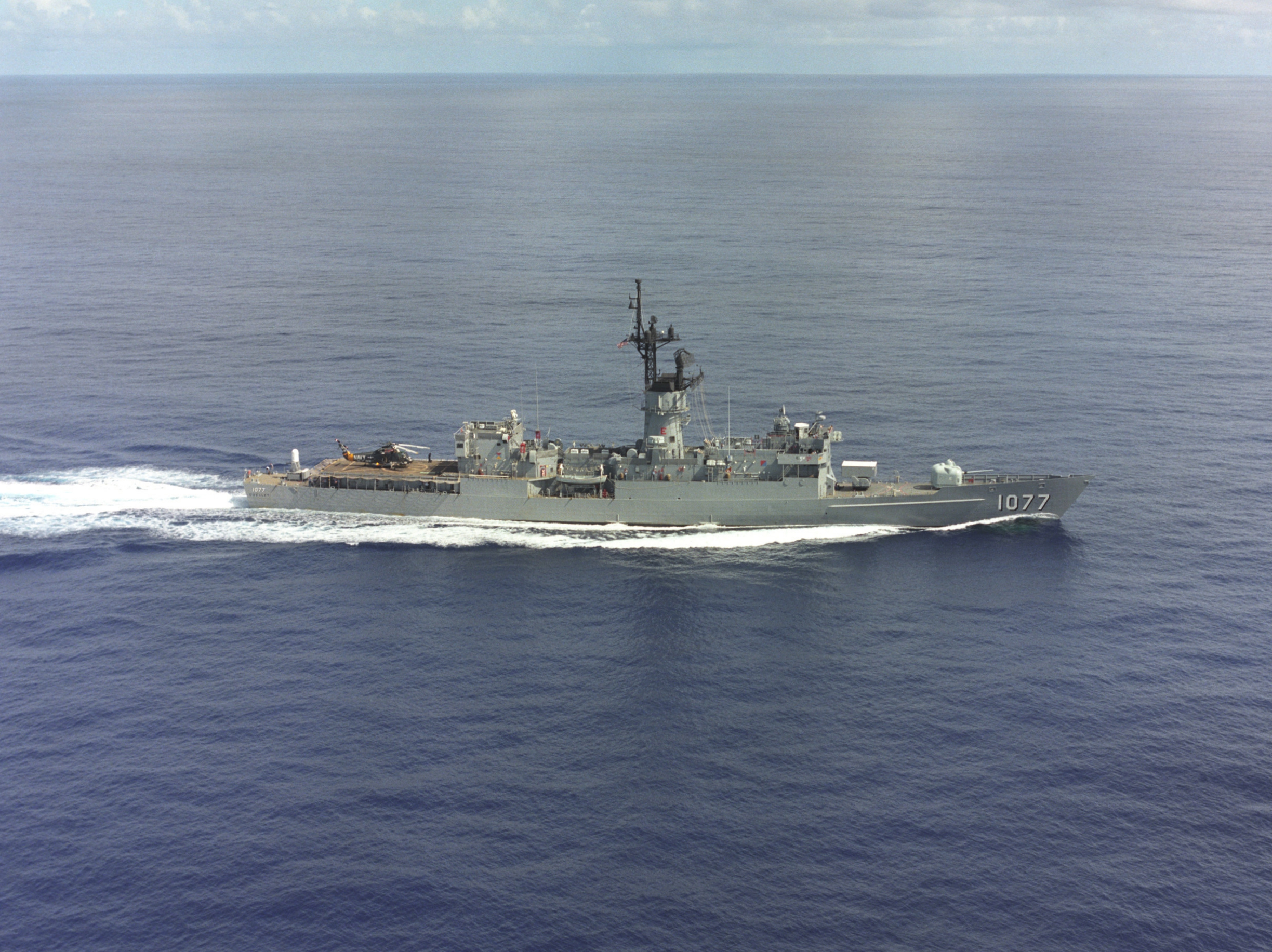
Ouellet underway in 1987

Ouellet started out 1988 with a special operation coordinated by the United States Coast Guard to capture Christina M, a cargo vessel laden with over 12 tons of marijuana. Instead of regular overhaul, Ouellet spent most of 1988 in a Ship's Restricted Availability repairing and upgrading most of her systems. Following extensive training, Ouellet made her ninth deployment in mid December 1988, where she headed to the Sea of Japan and the North Pacific Ocean. On 21 April 1989 USS Ouellet was first US Naval Vessel on scene for security and initial salvage of a Lockheed SR-71 Blackbird, AF Ser. No. 61-7974. She returned on 26 May 1989 to turn around and prepare to get underway again in September 1989 for "Pacific Exercises 89" (PAC EX 89).

In May 1989, Ouellet assisted firefighting efforts aboard USS White Plains (AFS-4) where six sailors were killed.

Upon return to Pearl Harbor in November 1989 she went into dry dock, refloating in February 1990. After extensive preparations and an exhaustive inspection cycle, Ouellet departed in August 1990 to Central America in support of law enforcement operations.

=== 1990s ===
Operations with a detachment of Coast Guard personnel to act as a legal "policing force" aboard Ouellet. This was the first time that a Coast Guard flag flew from a U.S. Navy warship in operations such as these. In search for drug smugglers, the frigate recovered close to 1 ton of pure, unprocessed cocaine, which was jettisoned from an unknown vessel trying to elude authorities. While on Law Enforcement Ops '90", Ouellet transited through the Panama Canal with follow-on ports-of-call in Panama and Curaçao, Netherlands Antilles. After returning in to Pearl Harbor in November 1990 Ouellet was awarded the "Battle E" for overall excellence and the Joint Meritorious Unit Citation.

In June 1991, Ouellet participated in three phases of shipboard training for midshipmen from the United States Naval Academy, and "Anti-Submarine Operations 91". Port calls made during this training period included visits to Vancouver, British Columbia, Canada and Kodiak Island, Alaska.

Ouellet's final deployment was from 25 March to 24 July 1992. This Western Pacific Rim journey was her 10th major deployment, and took Ouellet to Australia. While en route, she participated in "Pacific ASW Exercise 92", and operated with elements of the Royal Australian Navy in celebration of the 50th anniversary of the Battle of the Coral Sea.

This was her final voyage as a United States Navy vessel, USS Ouellet was decommissioned on 6 August 1993.

== HTMS Phutthaloetla Naphalai ==
The Royal Thai Navy purchased the ship from the US Navy after she was decommissioned on August 6, 1993. The ship subsequently underwent a US$14M refit at the Cascade General Shipyard, Portland, Oregon, and arrived in Thailand in 1998. The ship was renamed and commissioned as HTMS Phutthaloetla Naphalai (Thai: เรือหลวงพุทธเลิศหล้านภาลัย) with the identification number F-462. As a Phutthayotfa Chulalok-class frigate, she has a sister ship, the HTMS Phutthayotfa Chulalok (FFG 461).

== US Navy Awards ==
- Vietnam Service Medal, 15-Feb-1972 to 02-Mar-1972
- Combat Action Ribbon, 10-Apr-1972 to 11-Apr-1972
- Vietnam Service Medal, 13-Mar-1972 to 03-May-1972
- Vietnam Service Medal, 23-May-1972 to 31-May-1972
- Vietnam Service Medal, 03-Jun-1972 to 14-Jun-1972
- Vietnam Service Medal, 01-Jul-1972 to 31-Jul-1972
- Combat Action Ribbon, 24-Apr-1972
- Navy "E" Ribbon, 01-Jul-1974 to 01-Apr-1976
- Navy "E" Ribbon, 02-Apr-1976 to 30-Jun-1977
- Navy Expeditionary Medal, 30-Oct-1980 to 11-Mar-1981, Iran/Indian Ocean
- Navy "E" Ribbon, 01-Jul-1983 to 31-Dec-1984
- Navy Expeditionary Medal, 24-Jun-1987 to 23-Jul-1987, Persian Gulf
- Armed Forces Expeditionary Medal, 24-Jul-1987 to 24-Aug-1987, Persian Gulf
- Coast Guard SOS Ribbon, 11-Feb-1988 to 19-Feb-1988
- Secretary of the Navy Letter of Commendation, 01-Dec-1988 to 01-Apr-1989
- Joint Meritorious Unit Award, 15-Aug-1990 to 18-Nov-1990
- Navy "E" Ribbon, 01-Jul-1989 to 31-Dec-1990
- Navy "E" Ribbon, 01-Jan-1991 to 31-Dec-1992
- Secretary of the Navy Letter of Commendation as part of TG 75.4, 31-Mar-1992 to 17-Jul-1992
