= USS Truett =

Knox-class frigate (1973)

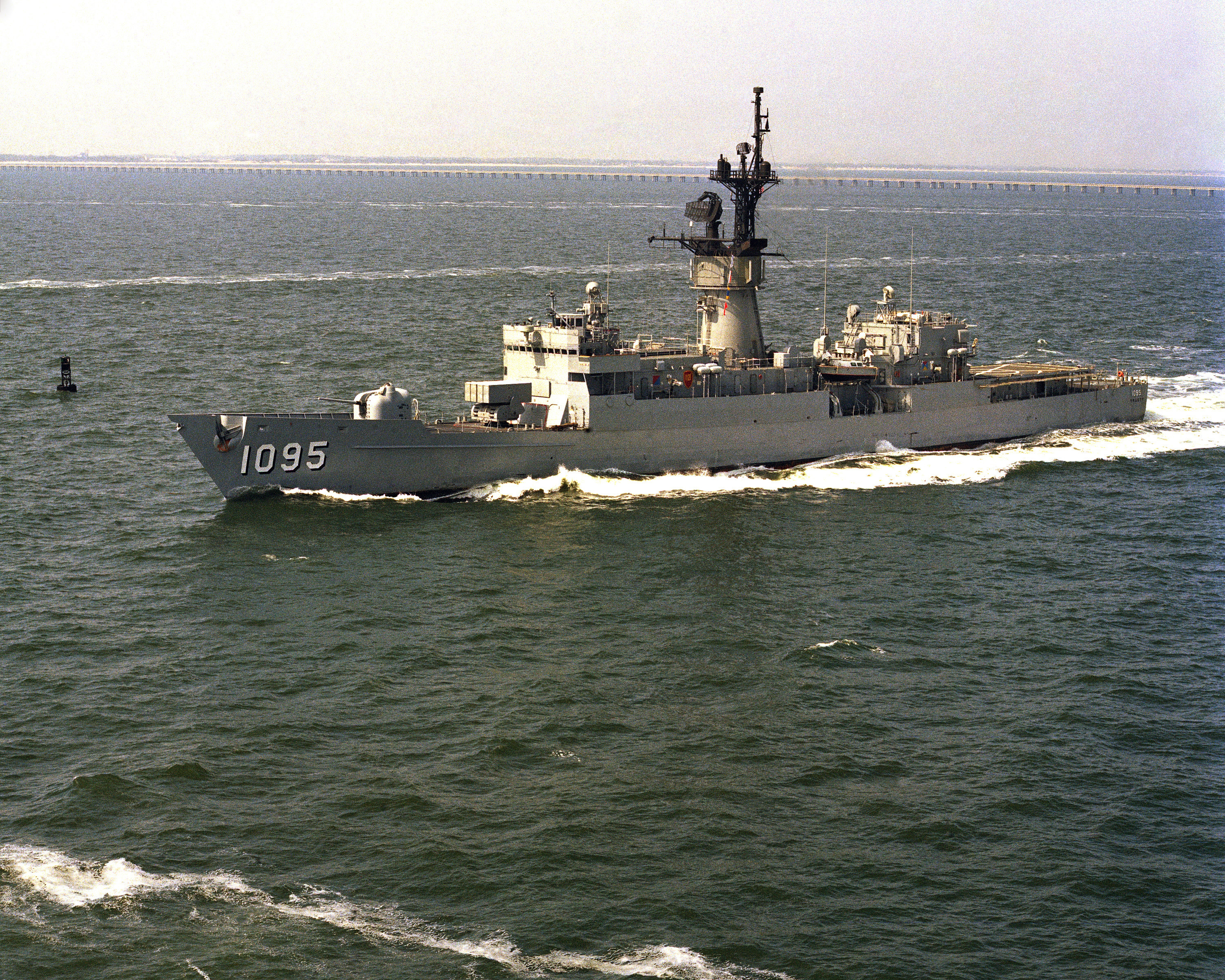
- USS Truett (FF-1095)

History

United States
- Ordered: 25 August 1966
- Builder: Avondale Shipyard, Westwego, Louisiana
- Laid down: 27 April 1972
- Launched: 3 February 1973
- Acquired: 24 May 1974
- Commissioned: 1 June 1974
- Decommissioned: 30 July 1994
- Stricken: 11 January 1995
- Motto: Dédication à dieu et patrie; Dedication to God and Fatherland
- Nickname(s): "Do it Truett"
- Fate: Leased to Royal Thai Navy in 1994 and eventually sold 9 December 1999

General characteristics
- Class & type: Knox-class frigate
- Displacement: 3,201 tons (4,182 tons full load)
- Length: 438 ft (134 m)
- Beam: 46 ft 9 in (14.25 m)
- Draft: 24 ft 9 in (7.54 m)
- Propulsion: 2 × CE 1200psi boilers; 1 Westinghouse geared turbine; 1 shaft, 35,000 SHP (26 MW)
- Speed: over 27 knots
- Boats & landing craft carried: 1 Diesel Capt. Gig. 1 26 ft Motor whale boat
- Complement: 18 officers, 267 enlisted
- Sensors & processing systems: AN/SPS-40 Air Search Radar; AN/SPS-67 Surface Search Radar; AN/SQS-26 Sonar; AN/SQR-18 Towed array sonar system; Mk68 Gun Fire Control System
- Electronic warfare & decoys: AN/SLQ-32 Electronics Warfare System
- Armament: one Mk-16 8 cell missile launcher for ASROC and Harpoon missiles; one Mk-42 5-inch/54 caliber gun; Mark 46 torpedoes from four single tube launchers); one 20mm Phalanx CIWS
- Aircraft carried: one SH-2 Seasprite (LAMPS I) helicopter

USS Truett (FF-1095) was a Knox-class frigate named after Quincy Hightower Truett, who received the Navy Cross posthumously. The ship retired from service with the Royal Thai Navy as the HTMS Phutthayotfa Chulalok (FFG 461).

Truett (DE-1095) was laid down on 27 April 1972 at Westwego, La., by Avondale Shipyards, Inc.; launched on 3 February 1973; sponsored by Mrs. Geraldine Truett Walter; delivered to the Navy on 24 May 1974 at the Norfolk Naval Shipyard, Portsmouth, Va.; and commissioned there on 1 June 1974.

On 20 August, Truett departed Hampton Roads and headed for the West Indies. After arriving at Guantanamo Bay, Cuba, on 3 September, the ocean escort devoted the next six weeks to a feverish series of drills and exercises to prepare for duty in the Atlantic Fleet. On 8 October, Truett completed shakedown training and sailed for home. After a brief stop at St. Thomas in the Virgin Islands, Truett returned to Norfolk on 18 October.

== Operational history ==
=== Unitas ===
Following local operations in the Hampton Roads area and repairs at the Norfolk Naval Shipyard, Truett got underway in April 1975 to conduct further tests and to train some 40 officers attending the Surface Warfare School. In May, she embarked her LAMPS helicopter and its detachment of officers and men. On 24 May, the ocean escort cleared Norfolk to participate in Exercise "Solid Shield." After nine days of hard work, she returned to Norfolk to prepare for a "Unitas" deployment. During her stay at Norfolk, the Navy re-classified the ship as a frigate on 1 July 1975 and redesignated her FF-1095.

Twenty days later, the frigate left Norfolk and set a course for the Panama Canal. En route, she conducted exercises with units of the Colombian Navy. Truett transited the canal on 8 August and headed down the western coast of South America. For the duration of "Unitas XVI," she trained with units of various South American navies, among which were those of Peru, Chile, Argentina, Uruguay, Brazil, and Venezuela. In the course of the deployment, she visited many ports and rounded Cape Horn at the southern tip of South America. After conducting exercises with the navies of the east coast nations of South America, she made a brief stop at Trinidad before returning home to Norfolk on 8 December. During the first two months of 1976, she resumed normal operations out of Norfolk.

=== NATO Standing Naval Force Atlantic ===
Between 3 and 21 March, Truett participated in an ASW-and-convoy-operations exercise, "Safepass 76," with units of NATO's Standing Naval Force Atlantic (STANAVFORLANT). Succeeding months were spent in preparation for the ship's forthcoming NATO deployment in the North Atlantic. Departing Norfolk on 14 June, Truett spent the next six months engaging in two major fleet exercises and visiting 20 ports from Norway to Portugal. During the early part of the deployment, she shadowed the new Soviet aircraft carrier Kiev, which was en route from the Black Sea to Murmansk on its maiden cruise, off the west coast of Scotland . The fleet frigate returned to Norfolk on 17 December and spent the remainder of the year enjoying a period of leave and a tender availability.

The greater part of 1977 was spent in priming the ship for deployment to the Mediterranean late in the year. During this workup period, Truett engaged in two major Atlantic Fleet exercises and underwent six inspections or qualifications. On 27 September, she departed for the Mediterranean and operations with the 6th Fleet which took her into the new year.

=== Mediterranean Sea ===
On 2 February 1978, Truett transited the Suez Canal and operated with the Middle East Force in the Red Sea and Gulf of Aden during the Ethiopian/Somali crisis. Her operations there included a 56-day, continuous at-sea period. Returning to the Mediterranean in April, Truett arrived back in Norfolk on 25 April. The summer was spent conducting operations off the east coast, and the fleet frigate then proceeded to Braswell Shipyard, Boston, for a regular overhaul which commenced on 27 September. The ship remained there into 1979.
