= HMCS Bras d'Or (FHE 400) =

Experimental military hydrofoil boat

Coordinates: 47°07′46″N 70°22′20″W

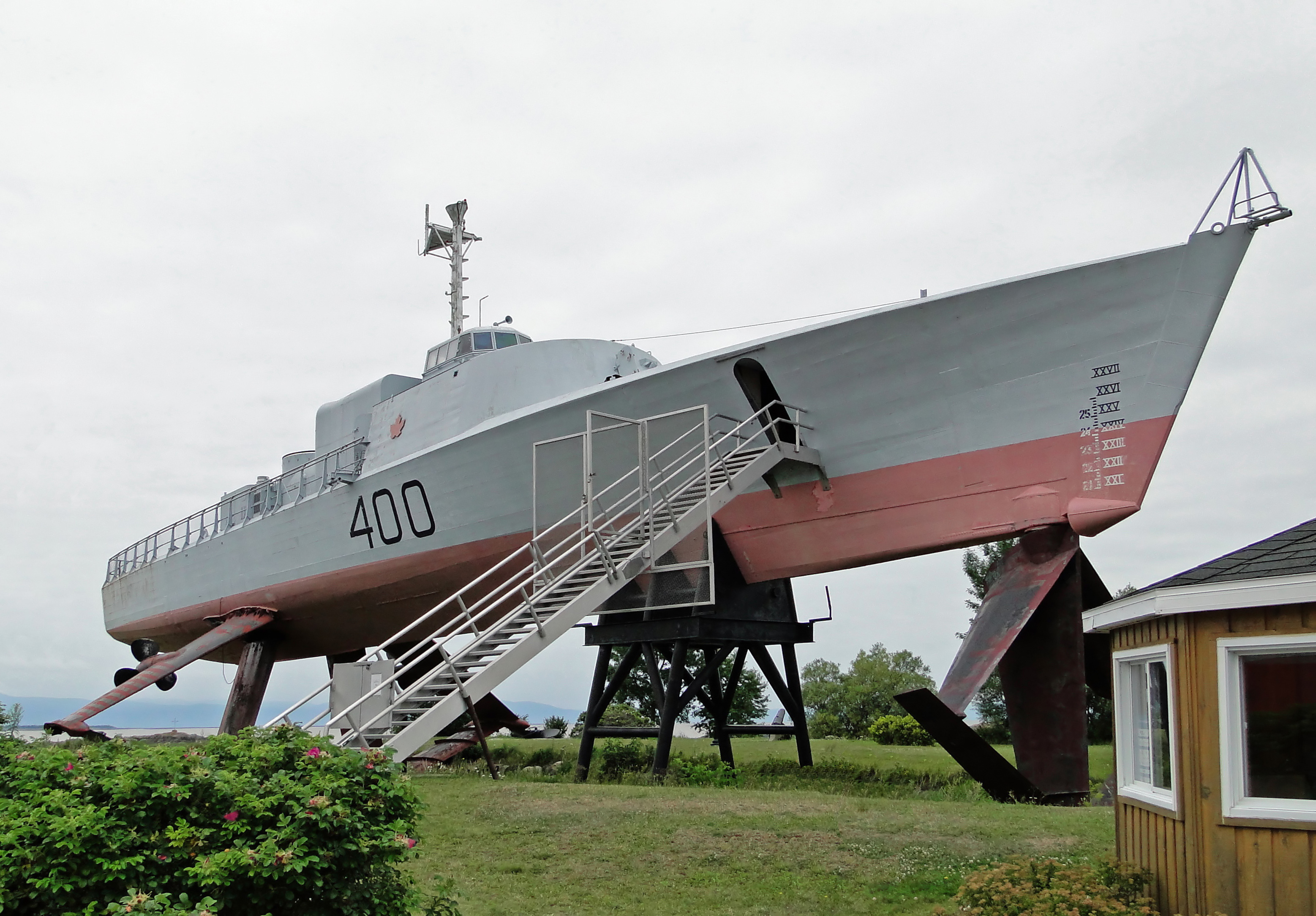
- HMCS Bras d'Or at the Musée maritime du Québec, L'Islet-sur-Mer

History

Canada
- Namesake: Bras d'Or Lake
- Ordered: 1960
- Builder: Marine Industries, Sorel
- Laid down: 1963
- Launched: 12 July 1968
- Commissioned: 23 July 1968
- Decommissioned: 2 November 1971
- Status: Museum ship
- Badge: Azure, issuing from a base barry wavy of four argent and azure, an arm embowed or, the hand grasping a pheon-headed spear in bend sinister pointed to the dexter argent

General characteristics
- Type: Hydrofoil
- Displacement: 240 t (236 long tons)
- Length: 49.95 m (163 ft 11 in)
- Beam: 66 ft (20 m) main foil span
- Propulsion: Foilborne : Pratt & Whitney FT4A-2 gas turbine, 25,500 hp (19,015 kW); Hullborne : Davey Paxman Ventura 16YJCM diesel engine, 2,400 bhp
- Speed: 60 knots (110 km/h; 69 mph)
- Range: 500 nmi (930 km; 580 mi)+ foilborne; 1,500 nmi (2,800 km)+ hullborne
- Complement: 25 (7 officers, 6 petty officers, 12 men)
- Armament: None

HMCS Bras d'Or (FHE 400) is a hydrofoil that served in the Canadian Forces from 1968 to 1971. During sea trials in 1969, the vessel exceeded 63 knots (117 km/h; 72 mph), making her the fastest unarmed warship in the world at the time.

The vessel was originally built from 1960 to 1967 for the Royal Canadian Navy, as a project for the testing of anti-submarine warfare technology on an ocean-going hydrofoil. The RCN was replaced on 1 February 1968 by the unified Canadian Armed Forces, and Bras d'Or was commissioned into that service several months later. Changes in priorities and cost overruns later led to the project's cancellation.

Bras d'Or was named in honour of Bras d'Or Lake on Nova Scotia's Cape Breton Island, where inventor Alexander Graham Bell performed hydrofoil experiments in the early 20th century near his estate and new laboratory at Beinn Bhreagh, setting the world watercraft speed record in the process. In 1909 the lake was also the historic site of the first flight of an aircraft in Canada and the British Commonwealth; the airplane, named the Silver Dart, was built by the Aerial Experiment Association under Dr. Bell's tutelage. The lake's name was thus fitting for a hydrofoil vessel which could 'fly' above an ocean's surface.

== Development ==
The RCN and British Admiralty studied the use of hydrofoils for anti-submarine work and coastal patrol craft began post Second World War. This led to a 17-tonne prototype, the R-103, built by Saunders-Roe in the UK, and sea-trialled in Canada. That experimental craft resulted in the foil configuration used for Bras d'Or.

== Construction ==
Bras d'Or was the third vessel to bear that name (see below + B-119 ex PT-3 during World War II under lend-lease) and was built at Marine Industries Limited (MIL) in Sorel, Quebec, the primary contractor being de Havilland Canada, an aircraft company. The Principal Naval Overseer was Commander Donald Clark, CD, RCN, who initiated the project on completion and launch of HMCS Nipigon in 1964. The hull was built upside down out of aluminum and rotated in December 1965 when it was complete. The foil system was constructed from maraging steel.

Bras d'Or flew on a set of surface-piercing foils in a canard configuration (a small foil forward and a larger load-bearing foil aft). The foils were made of maraging steel coated in neoprene to prevent corrosion. However, the neoprene coating did not work adequately and the foils still suffered corrosion.

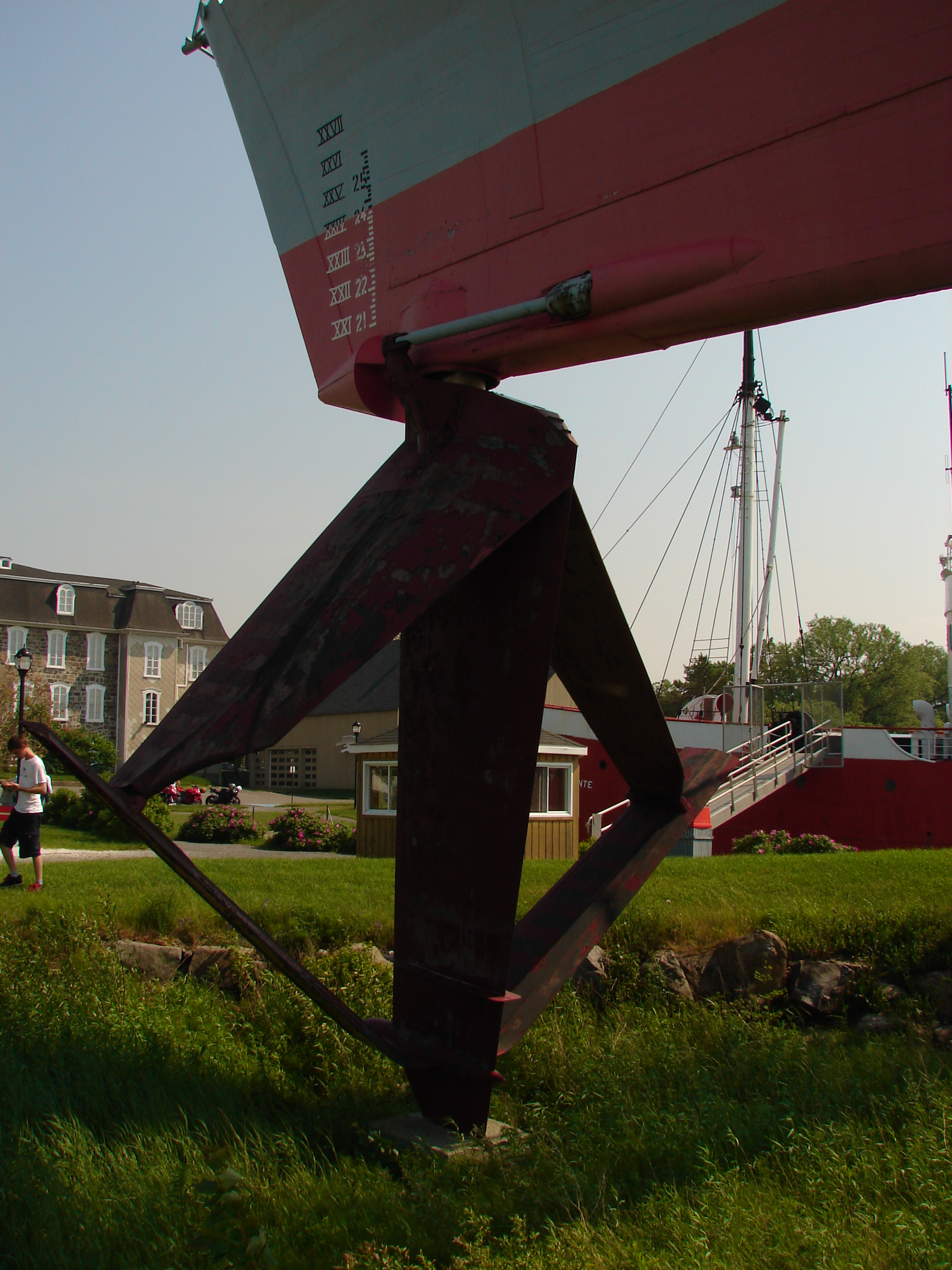
Diamond-shaped front foil

The main foils featured several parts: two anhedral foils, two anhedral tips, two dihedral foils, and a centre high-speed foil. The steerable front foil featured two anhedral sections and two dihedral sections with a strut down the middle, resulting in a diamond shape.

The ship's helmsman had to be qualified as both a sea pilot and an aircraft pilot. Bras d'Or had two propulsion systems: one for foilborne operation and one for hullborne operation, which included four engines. Foilborne power was provided by a FT4A-2 gas turbine developing 25,500 horsepower (19.0 MW) at 21,500 rpm through General Electric gearboxes to a pair of three-bladed supercavitating propellers. Hullborne propulsion was driven by a Paxman Ventura 16YJCM sixteen-cylinder diesel engine to a pair of variable-pitch propellers. Auxiliary power and electrical power while foilborne was provided by an ST6A-53 gas turbine powering an auxiliary gearbox. Both of the P&W turbines were built by United Aircraft of Canada. There was also a Garrett GTCP85-291 gas turbine for essential ship electrical requirements in emergencies.

On 5 November 1966, a de Havilland employee was in the main engine room with the ST6 running when a hydraulic fluid leak ignited on a hot joint in the ST6's exhaust stack, resulting in a flash fire. The technician responsible for the fire-suppression system rescued the employee, but as a result did not have time to activate the fire-suppression system.

The fire was put out one and a half hours later by the Sorel fire department. This delayed the ship's launch to 12 July 1968 and cost $5.7 million.

== Trials ==
Bras d'Or first flew on 9 April 1969 near Chebucto Head off the entrance to Halifax Harbour. The vessel exhibited extraordinary stability in rough weather, frequently more stable at 40 knots (70 km/h; 50 mph) than a conventional ship at 18 knots (33 km/h; 21 mph). Bras d'Or exceeded 63 knots (117 km/h; 72 mph) on trials, quite possibly making her the fastest warship ever built. It was however, never fitted with equipment for warfare (no weapons or weapons systems) and the title now lies with the fully equipped Abu Dhabi MAR WP-18 Interceptor.

== Cancellation ==
Bras d'Or's trial program was abruptly cancelled on 2 November 1971 by Minister of National Defence Donald S. Macdonald, attributing it to a change in defence priority (from anti-submarine warfare to sovereignty protection). The ship was laid up for five years, then the program was completely cancelled by Liberal Government under Pierre Elliott Trudeau, with most of the valuable components either sold by Crown Assets or scrapped.

The ship itself was saved and donated to the Musée Maritime du Québec at L'Islet-sur-Mer, Quebec where it remains on display to this day.

== See also ==
- Bras d'Or (R-103), experimental hydrofoil (1957–1962)
- HMCS Bras d'Or (1919), auxiliary minesweeper (1939–1940)
- Musée Maritime du Québec
- HMS Speedy (P296), a Royal Navy jetfoil mine countermeasure vessel.
- Pegasus-class hydrofoil, a class of USN PHM
- Matka-class missile boat, a class of Soviet PHM
- Sarancha-class missile boat, a class of Soviet PHM
- Sparviero-class patrol boat, a class of Italian PHM
