= David George Ouellet =

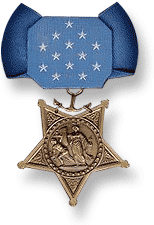
- David George Ouellet, Medal of Honor recipient
- Born: June 13, 1944; Newton, Massachusetts, U.S.
- Died: March 6, 1967 (aged 22); Mekong River, Republic of Vietnam
- Burial place: Woodlawn Cemetery Wellesley, Massachusetts
- Military career
- Allegiance: United States of America
- Branch: United States Navy
- Service years: 1964–1967
- Rank: Seaman
- Units: River Squadron Five; My Tho Detachment 532
- Conflicts: Vietnam War †
- Awards: Medal of Honor; Purple Heart

David George Ouellet (June 13, 1944 – March 6, 1967) was a US Navy seaman, and received the Medal of Honor for his actions in the Vietnam War.

== Biography ==
Ouellet was born in Newton, Massachusetts. After finishing school, he enlisted in the United States Navy July 28, 1964 and upon completion of his training, joined Assault Craft Division Twelve for duty in Vietnam. After five months in Vietnam, he was ordered to San Diego, California for training in river patrol boats. Upon completion of this training, he returned to Vietnam and joined River Squadron Five, My Tho Detachment 532. He was on patrol in PBR–124 on March 6, 1967, as the forward machine gunner. While patrolling near a river bank, Seaman Ouellet saw an enemy grenade coming towards his boat. He ran back towards the stern shouting for everybody to take cover and when seeing the boat captain unprotected, he pushed him down a hatch to safety. Between the split second the missile landed in the boat and exploded, Seaman Ouellet placed himself between the missile and his shipmates and absorbed the impact of the blast. As a result, Seaman Ouellet was mortally wounded. For his heroic sacrifice, he was posthumously awarded the Medal of Honor. He is buried at Woodlawn Cemetery in Wellesley, Massachusetts. His name is listed on the Vietnam Veterans Memorial on panel 16E, Row 030.

== Medal of Honor citation ==
Seaman David G. Ouellet, United States Navy, (posthumous), Seaman, U.S. Navy, River Squadron 5, My Tho Detachment 532., Mekong River, Republic of Vietnam, March 6, 1967.

For conspicuous gallantry and intrepidity at the risk of his life above and beyond the call of duty while serving with River Section 532, in combat against the enemy in the Republic of Vietnam. As the forward machine gunner on River Patrol Boat (PBR) 124, which was on patrol on the Mekong River during the early evening hours of March 6, 1967, Seaman Ouellet observed suspicious activity near the river bank, alerted his Boat Captain, and recommended movement of the boat to the area to investigate. While the PBR was making a high-speed run along the river bank, Seaman Ouellet spotted an incoming enemy grenade falling toward the boat. He immediately left the protected position of his gun mount and ran aft for the full length of the speeding boat, shouting to his fellow crew members to take cover. Observing the Boat Captain standing unprotected on the boat, Seaman Ouellet bounded onto the engine compartment cover, and pushed the Boat Captain down to safety. In the split second that followed the grenade's landing, and in the face of certain death, Seaman Ouellet fearlessly placed himself between the deadly missile and his shipmates, courageously absorbing most of the blast fragments with his own body in order to protect his shipmates from injury and death. His extraordinary heroism and his selfless and courageous actions on behalf of his comrades at the expense of his own life were in the finest tradition of the United States Naval Service.

== Decorations and medals ==

Medal of Honor
Purple Heart	Combat Action Ribbon	National Defense Service Medal
Vietnam Service Medal w/ two 3/16" bronze stars	Republic of Vietnam Gallantry Cross w/ palm and frame	Republic of Vietnam Campaign Medal w/ 1960– device

== Other honors ==
Seaman Ouellet was given the ultimate honor by the Navy, when they commissioned the USS Ouellet (FF-1077), December 12, 1970.

== See also ==
- List of Medal of Honor recipients for the Vietnam War
- USS Ouellet (FF-1077)
