= Musée Maritime du Québec =

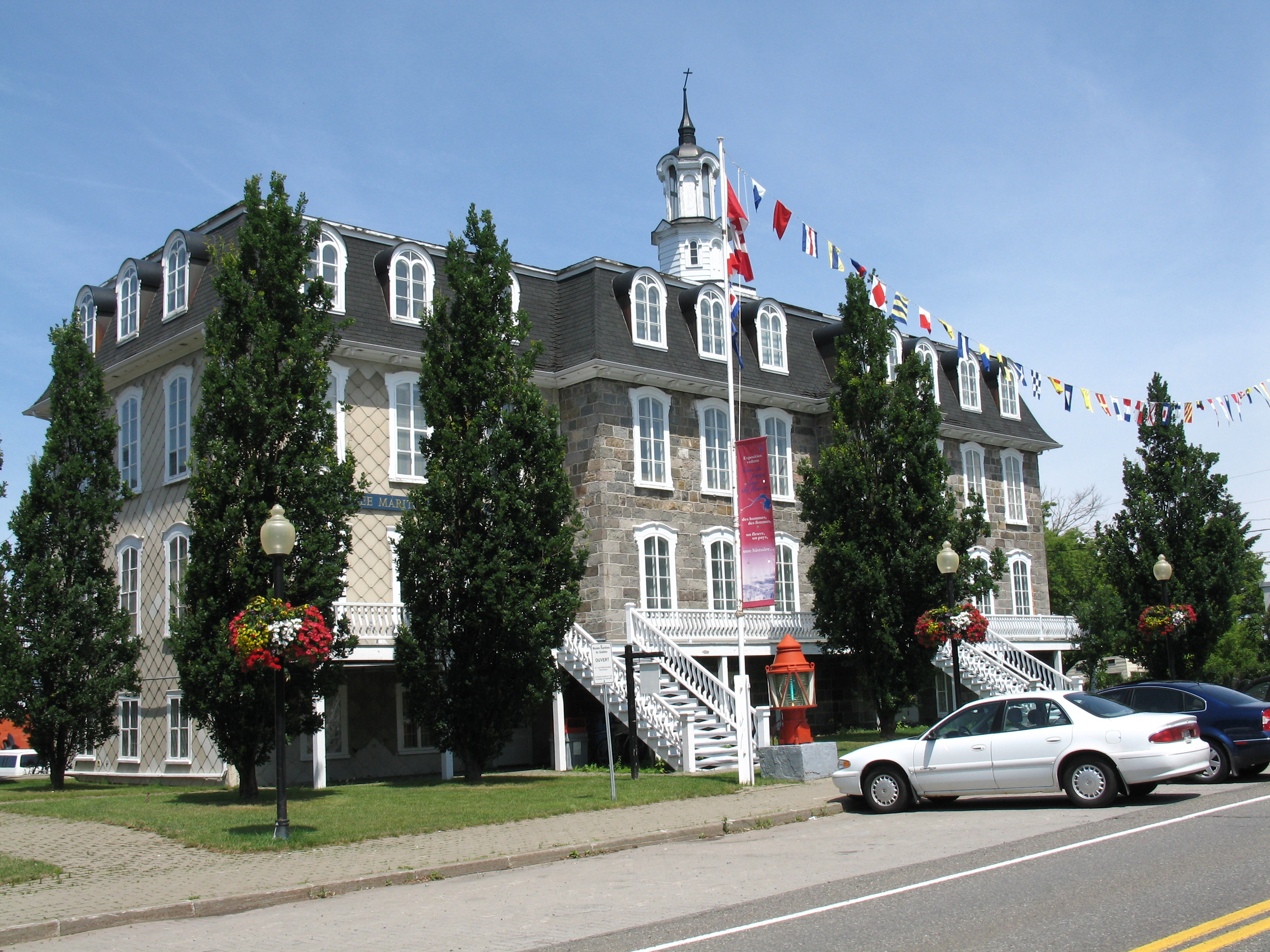
- The Musée Maritime du Québec
- Former name: Musée Bernier
- Established: 1968
- Location: 55 chemin des Pionniers Est; L'Islet, Quebec
- Coordinates: 47.128677°N 70.371364°W
- Collection size: 12,000 objects and documents
- Visitors: 15,000
- Founders: The Association for Sailors, St. Lawrence Valley
- Website: www.mmq.qc.ca

The Musée Maritime du Québec (French pronunciation: [myze maʁitim dy kebɛk], Maritime Museum of Québec; also known as the Musée Bernier) is a maritime museum located in the centre of the municipality of L'Islet in the Chaudière-Appalaches region of Quebec, Canada.

The museum consists of an outdoor park that includes three separate museum ships, a historic building with exhibitions on the theme of the sea and a hanger-workshop with exhibits on the building of small wooden ships and vessels.

== Description ==
The museum is located in the municipality of L'Islet on the south shore of the St. Lawrence River, about 100 kilometres (62 mi) east of Québec City. The municipality has a rich maritime history, including the training of maritime navigators associated with the Canadian Merchant Navy.

The museum's mission is to safeguard, enhance and enable the study of the maritime heritage related to the St. Lawrence River, from the Great Lakes to the high seas, including the Arctic territories.

The museum was previously named the Maritime Musée Bernier in honour of Captain Joseph-Elzéar Bernier (1852–1934), a L'Islet native and mariner who explored the Canadian Arctic.

Three museum ships on display are:

- HMCS Bras d'Or (FHE 400), a Canadian Armed Forces hydrofoil
- CCGS Ernest Lapointe, a Canadian Coast Guard light icebreaker
- J.E. Bernier II, a sailboat

== History ==
=== Origins ===
The maritime history of the L'Islet region dates to its New France period. In 1853, the Christian Brothers created a school and taught maritime navigation. After a slow start, the school took the form of an "Industrial College" in 1873, better known today as the l'École des marins (School for sailors), providing seamanship training. In 1920, navigators who trained at the school founded the Association for Sailors in the St. Lawrence Valley. They organized several exhibitions in the local maritime college and founded the museum in 1968, Canada's first maritime museum.

The region of Quebec that lies in the St. Lawrence River valley, from Levis to Kamouraska, has a history of shipbuilding with over 2,000 vessels built in the 19th century. From its inception, the museum benefited from the help of local agencies and the Ministry of Culture of Quebec. This support allowed the museum to collect hundreds of maritime objects in its early years, objects that form the core of its collection. It was recognized by the Ministry of Culture of Quebec in 1975 and is the proprietor of the National Maritime Collection of Quebec.

=== Maritime park enlargement in 1983 ===
In 1979 Canada Steamship Lines (CSL) donated the JE Bernier II, a maritime museum-boat which it had sponsored on a journey through the Northwest Passage in 1977. The museum acquired a second ship in 1980, the CCGS Ernest Lapointe, a Canadian Coast Guard icebreaker used on the Saint Lawrence River. In 1983 the museum acquired a third ship, the military hydrofoil, HMCS Bras d'Or of the Canadian Forces Maritime Command, which became the world's fastest warship in the early 1970s.

In 1983, the museum expanded and underwent a major renovation to meet current museum standards.

In 1997, the museum began construction of a hangar-workshop to house the collection of traditional small wooden boats. The project proved controversial among locals because of the architectural style of windowless building and because its location west of the convent blocked the view of the river and its museum-ships. However, the museum's management argued that the site chosen was the only possible one and that the building could not use another location. The construction ended in June 1998, and the museum then possessed a collection of 35 vessels from most maritime regions of Québec (Île d'Orléans, Île aux Coudres and Kamouraska).

In 2001, the museum received an award from the Québec Ministry of Tourism. This award recognized the efforts of the museum over the previous 33 years and invited visitors to make "an appointment with naval history" through its exhibits and its museum ships.

=== Continued expansion and new exhibits, 2009–2013 ===
In January 2007, the museum received a grant CA$1.35 million from the Quebec Department of Culture and Communications to help its expansion plans and the preservation of its collections. Financial assistance also allowed the museum to improve its reception area, and its maintenance and repair of the main building. The total cost of the work is estimated at $2.25 million. At the end of 2007, the Canadian government announced its participation with a grant of $950,000.

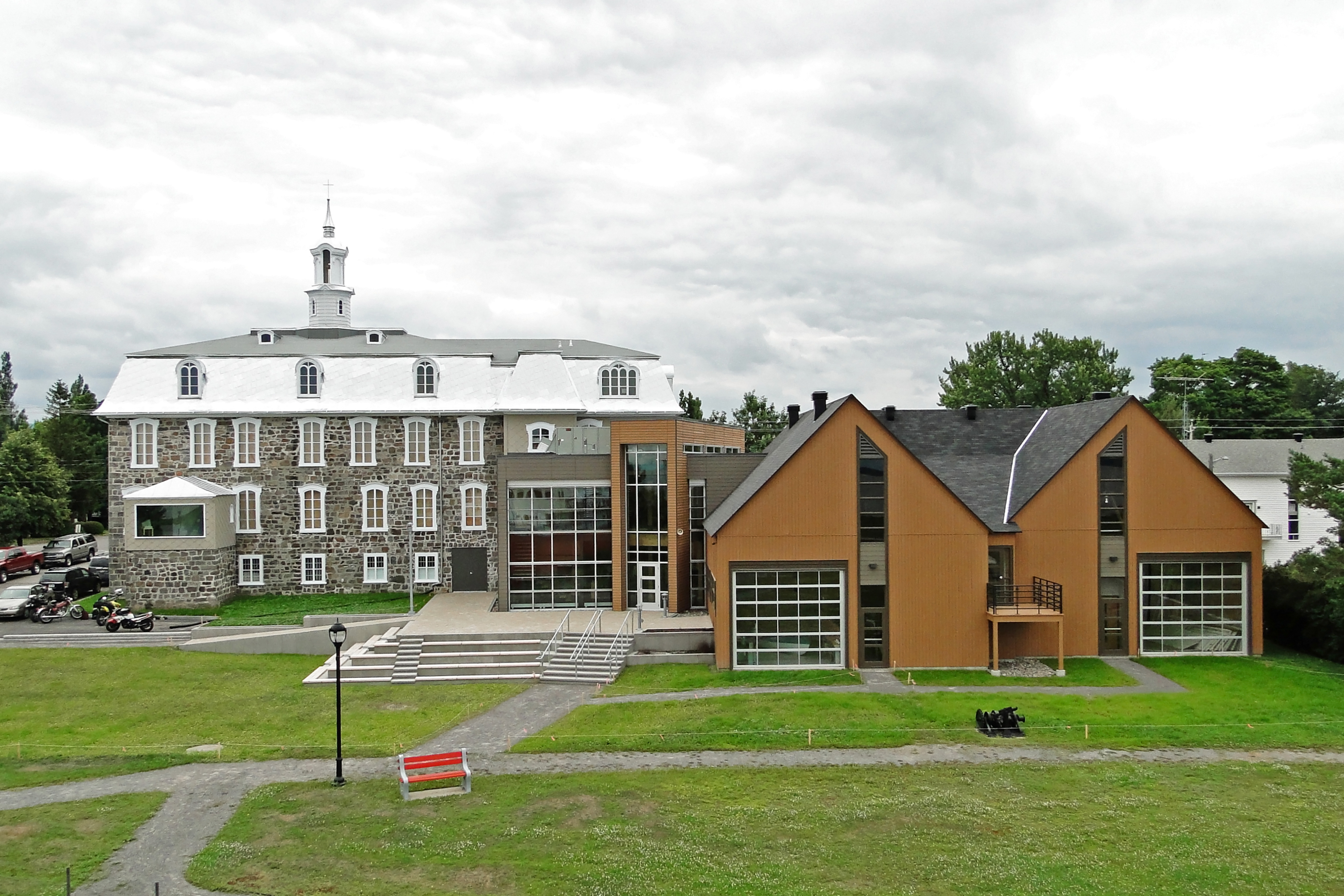
Rear of the former convent museum building, at left, as well as the museum's small vessel workshop at right

The expansion work and restoration of the museum began in September 2009. Renovations were carried out on the former convent building of the Surs du Bon-Pasteur such as restoring its windows, masonry and roofing. The museum was expanded by adding a section between the convent and its chapel.

The museum also took possession of a former National Bank branch building located next to the convent, which was converted into a conservatory storage facility. The space recovered in the convent building increased the exhibition space, especially for the collection of 200 boat models, and added a theatre that will be used mainly for maritime heritage films. Work was completed in July 2010.

The total project cost was CA$4.4 million, with the Quebec government contribution increased to $3.05 million to allow completion of the work. The J.E. Bernier Foundation also contributed $250,000 in order to restore museum vessels. Other local agencies completed the financing of the project.

On 15 September 2010, the museum received an additional $500,000 for the construction of a new permanent exhibit. The permanent exhibits are to be fully restored and the grant will aid the interpretation of shipbuilding. The public should have access to the new exhibit in June 2013. From the summer of 2012, the museum will be open to visitors through guided tours.

== See also ==
- List of museum ships in Canada
