= HMCS Bras d'Or (1919) =

Canadian warship

History

Canada
- Name: Lightship No. 25 (1926–1939); HMCS Bras d'Or (1939–1940)
- Namesake: Bras d'Or Lake
- Owner: Canada
- Operator: Department of Marine and Fisheries (1926–1939); Royal Canadian Navy (1939–1940)
- Builder: Sorel Shipyard, Sorel
- Yard number: 18
- Launched: 1919
- Completed: 1926
- Commissioned: as HMCS Bras d'Or 15 September 1939
- Home port: Rimouski (1939); Halifax (1940)
- Fate: Foundered in the Gulf of St. Lawrence near Pointe-Sud-Ouest, Anticosti Island

General characteristics
- Type: Auxiliary minesweeper
- Tonnage: 265 GRT
- Length: 124 ft 6 in (37.95 m)
- Beam: 23 ft 6 in (7.16 m)
- Height: 12 ft 5 in (3.78 m)
- Speed: 7 knots (13 km/h; 8.1 mph)
- Range: 2,000 nmi (3,700 km; 2,300 mi)
- Crew: 5 officers and 25 ratings

HMCS Bras d'Or was an auxiliary minesweeper that served in the Royal Canadian Navy (RCN) between 1939 and 1940, when she sank with all hands in a storm. Previous to her service in the RCN, she served as Lightship No. 25 in the Canadian Department of Marine and Fisheries.

== Early history ==
Bras d'Or was ordered by a New York ship owner who also ordered five other trawlers of the same class. Soon after her launch, the ship owner went bankrupt and Bras d'Or and her sisters were sold incomplete. She was finally finished in 1926 by the shipyard in Sorel, Quebec, for lightship service with the Department of Marine and Fisheries as Lightship No. 25.

== Naval requisition ==
With the lead-up to war, many civilian departments within the Canadian Government had their ships requisitioned for use in the naval service. Bras d'Or was requisitioned on 15 September 1939 and was converted to an auxiliary minesweeper and received her new name and posting. Her first posting was to Halifax, Nova Scotia, where she was tasked to patrol the harbour approaches to free up major warships for convoy duty.

On 14 November 1939 Bras d'Or and the destroyer HMCS Fraser collided in the approaches of Halifax Harbour. The incident lead to a board of inquiry that was clouded in suspicion regarding the findings. Many believed that the board had tried to protect a regular naval officer, Commander W.B. Creery, RCN, captain of Fraser, at the expense of a reserve officer, Lt A.K. Young, RCNR, captain of Bras d'Or.

== St. Lawrence patrol ==
Bras d'Or was posted to Rimouski, Quebec, as part of the St. Lawrence Patrol, responsible for searching shallow waters for naval mines that were believed to be laid by German U-boats.

During her short time spent in the St. Lawrence, Bras d'Or was very active patrolling for mines. On 10 June 1940 she intercepted and captured the Italian freighter Capo Noli in its attempt to escape to Axis-occupied Europe. The crew of the Italian freighter ran their ship aground and set her on fire in an attempt to destroy the vessel. However, Bras d'Or's crew was able to board and douse the fire. Capo Noli was eventually renamed and put into Canadian Government service as a freighter named Bic Island, named after the island she had tried to destroy herself on.

== Bras d'Or is overdue ==
On 17 October 1940, Bras d'Or was ordered to proceed to Clarke City, Quebec, to shadow the Romanian freighter Inginer N. Vlassopol and to ensure that she made way to Sydney, Nova Scotia. While departing Rimouski Bras d'Or grounded herself on a shoal only minutes outside of port. She managed to free herself and continue on to Clarke City. She departed Clarke City on 18 October shadowing the Romanian freighter. Both ships encountered poor weather on the way to Sydney, and as darkness fell both ships turned on their navigation lights, an odd thing for a naval vessel to do during wartime. At 0350 on 19 October the first officer of Inginer N. Vlassopol reported that the lights of Bras d'Or had suddenly vanished.

== Aftermath ==
The Romanian freighter arrived in Sydney without Bras d'Or, and the authorities in Sydney announced that she was nine days overdue. The master of the Romanian freighter was interviewed by A/Cdr J.D. Prentice, and the master reported that Bras d'Or had been with her until he had gone to bed, and that his first officer had reported the lights on Bras d'Or going out.

It is believed that she had sustained unnoticed hull damage when she had run aground just outside Rimouski, and that it combined with the poor weather and sea conditions led to her destruction. The entire Atlantic seaboard had been experiencing poor conditions, and the fishing vessel Bluebird from Newfoundland was also lost in the storm.

The Royal Canadian Navy released a 225-word statement regarding the overdue Bras d'Or and provided a small biography of its captain and a recount of her capturing Capo Noli.

== Legacy ==
A second ship named HMCS Bras d'Or (FHE 400) was commissioned into the Canadian Forces in 1968. HMCS Bras d'Or was a hydrofoil that served in the Canadian Forces from 1968 to 1971. During sea trials in 1969, the vessel exceeded 63 knots (117 km/h; 72 mph), making her the fastest unarmed warship in the world at the time.

Located in Rothesay, New Brunswick, Royal Canadian Sea Cadets Corps Bras d'Or (#268) remains as a memory to Bras d'Or.
