= Bras d'Or (R-103) =

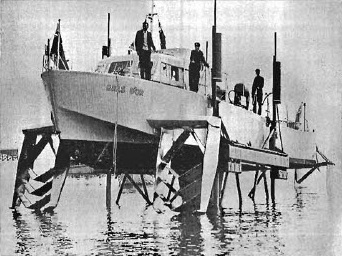

History

Canada
- Name: Bras d'Or
- Namesake: Bras d'Or Lake, Nova Scotia
- Ordered: September 1953
- Builder: Saunders-Roe, United Kingdom
- Launched: 22 May 1957
- In service: 26 June 1957
- Out of service: 1973
- Home port: Halifax, Nova Scotia
- Status: Stored Museum ship at the Canada Science and Technology Museum in Ottawa
- Notes: Renamed Baddeck 1962

General characteristics
- Type: Hydrofoil
- Displacement: 17 t (17 long tons)
- Length: 18.00 m (59 ft 1 in)
- Propulsion: 2 Rolls-Royce Griffon gasoline engines 1,500 hp at 3,000 rpm
- Speed: 30 knots (56 km/h; 35 mph)
- Complement: approx. 2+
- Armament: None

Bras d'Or (R-103) was a small experimental hydrofoil built for the Royal Canadian Navy (RCN) during the 1950s. It led to the development of HMCS Bras d'Or (FHE 400) in the late 1960s.

Built by Saunders-Roe from either a Saunder-Roe motor boat or Vosper PT boat hull, the Bras d'Or was built based on the prototype R-101 in service with the Royal Navy. Launched in 1957, it underwent trials off Wales in May and arrived in Canada in July. Acquired by the Royal Canadian Navy, it was never commissioned as a warship.

Bras d'Or (R-103) was renamed Baddeck in 1962 as the name "Bras d'Or" was to be provided to HMCS Bras d'Or (FHE 400). Baddeck retired from the Canadian Forces in 1973 and was later acquired by the Canada Science and Technology Museum in Ottawa, Ontario. Baddeck remains in storage with her three foils detached and stored separately.
