= L'Islet, Quebec =

L'Islet
- Municipality
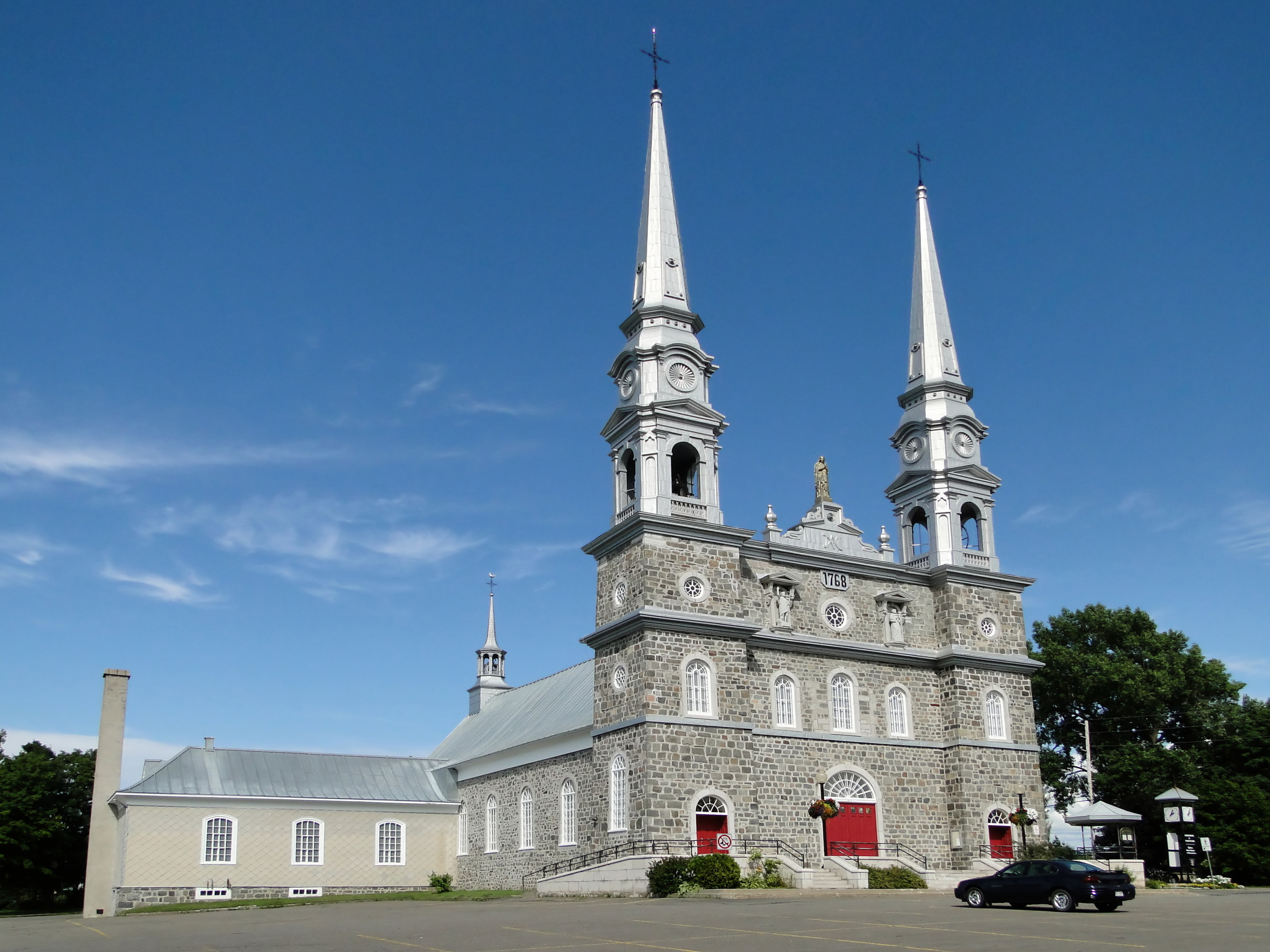
- Church of Notre-Dame-Bonsecours

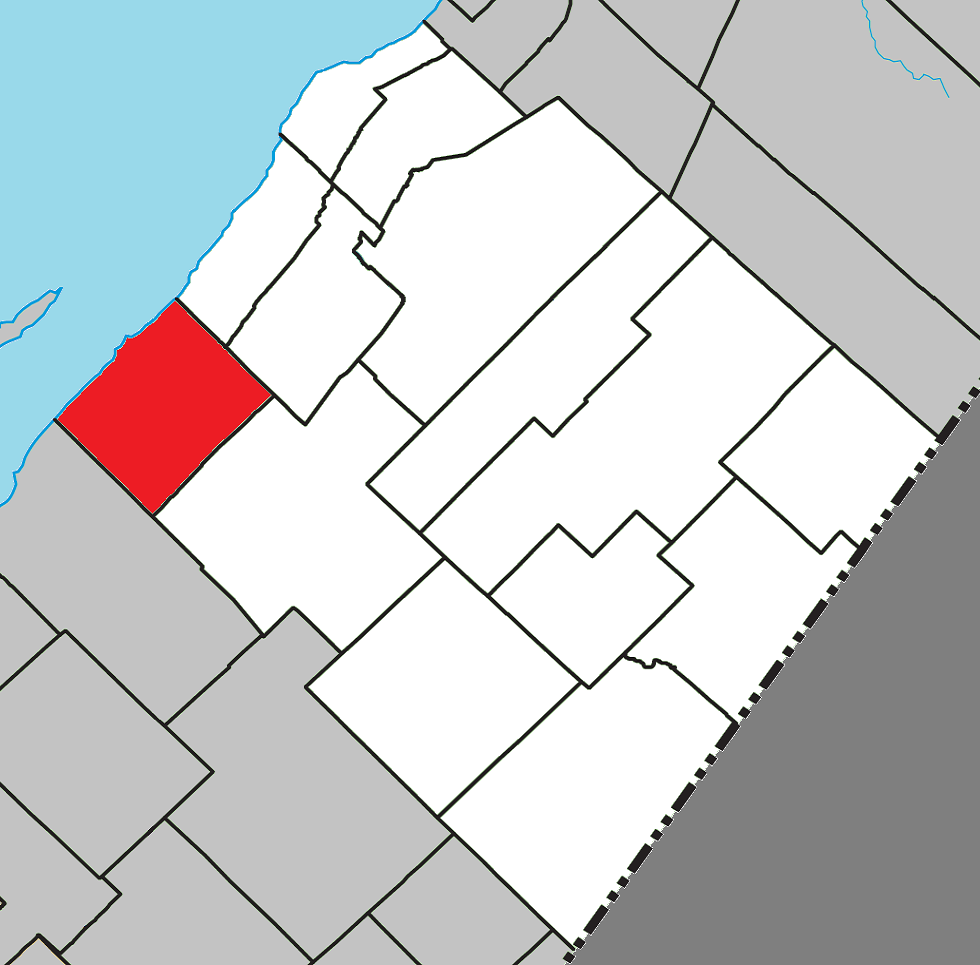
- Location within L'Islet RCM

- Location in southern Quebec
- Coordinates: 47°06′N 70°21′W
- Country: Canada
- Province: Quebec
- Region: Chaudière-Appalaches
- RCM: L'Islet
- Constituted: January 1, 2000

Government
  - Mayor: André Caron
  - Federal riding: Côte-du-Sud—Rivière-du-Loup—Kataskomiq—Témiscouata
  - Prov. riding: Côte-du-Sud

Area
  - Total: 176.30 km^{2} (68.07 sq mi)
  - Land: 120.02 km^{2} (46.34 sq mi)

Population (2011)
  - Total: 3,999
  - Density: 33.3/km^{2} (86/sq mi)
  - Pop 2006-2011: ▲4.1%
  - Dwellings: 1,907
- Time zone: UTC−5 (EST)
  - Summer (DST): UTC−4 (EDT)
- Postal code(s): G0R 2C0
- Area codes: 418 and 581
- Highways A-20 (TCH): R-132; R-285
- Website: www.lislet.com

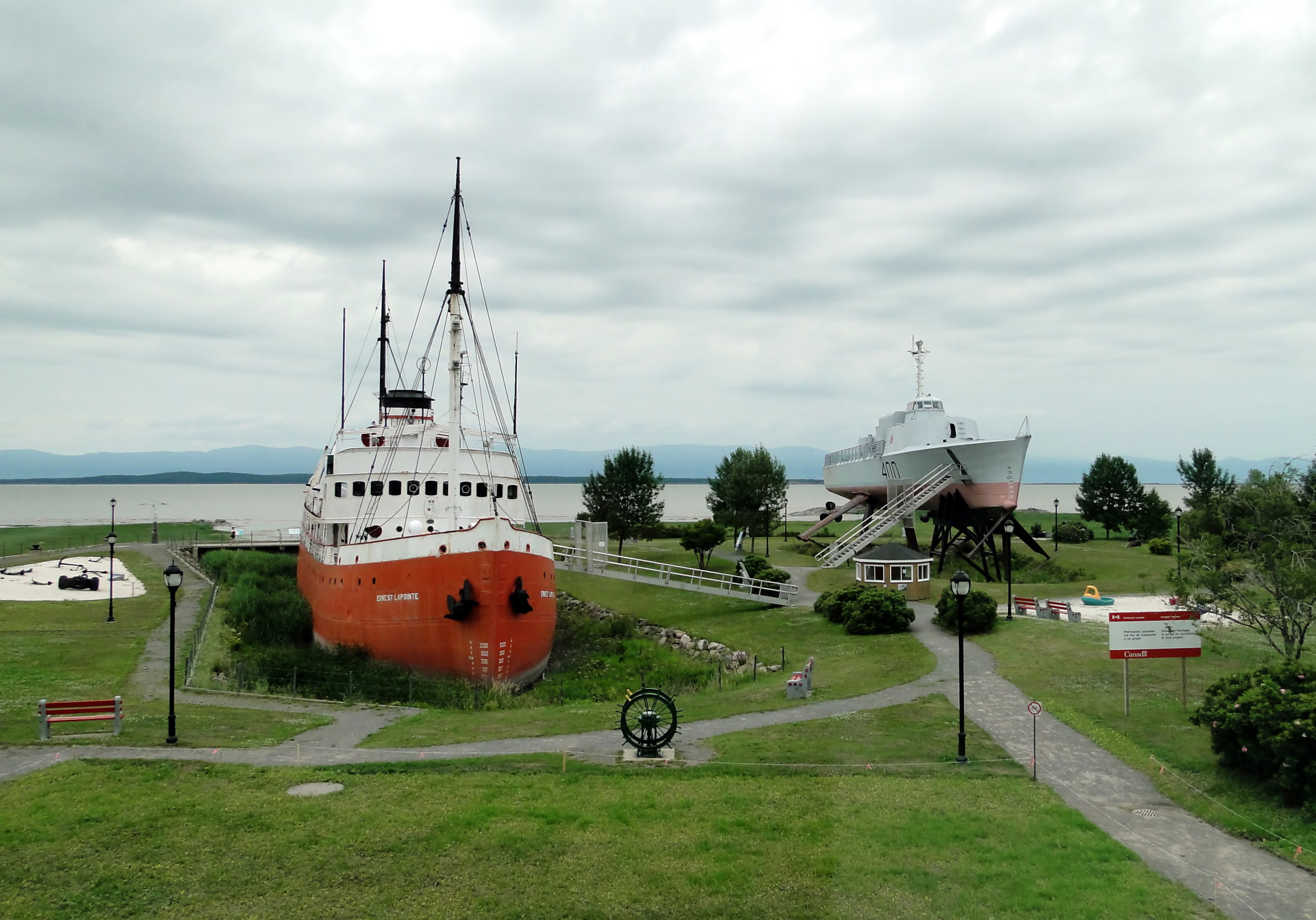
The icebreaker CCGS Ernest Lapointe and HMCS Bras d'Or at the Musée Maritime du Québec.

L'Islet (French pronunciation: [lilɛ]) is a municipality within L'Islet Regional County Municipality in the Chaudière-Appalaches region of Quebec, Canada.

It is located on the south shore of the Saint Lawrence River halfway between Quebec City and Rivière-du-Loup. The Musée Maritime du Québec (Quebec Marine Museum) is located there on Route 132.

== History and geography ==
The current town of L'Islet was formed in 2000 with the merger of the former city of L'Islet, the municipality of L'Islet-sur-Mer, and the parish municipality of Saint-Eugène.

The municipality got its name from a small island in the river near the village of L'Islet-sur-Mer.

The Notre-Dame-de-Bonsecours church, built 1768, is classified as important historical building.

The town hosts many small events during the year such as the Festival Guitares en fête, La Parades des Berlots, and the L'Islet Car Show.

Local rivers include the:

- Tortue River
- Bras St-Nicolas River
- Talbot River

== Notable people ==
- Adine Fafard-Drolet, singer and founder of a music school
- Xavier Bourgault, junior ice hockey forward drafted to the Edmonton Oilers of the National Hockey League during the 2021 NHL Entry Draft.
- Joseph-Elzéar Bernier, ship captain and National Historic Person of Canada

== See also ==
- List of municipalities in Quebec
