= George Badger =

George Badger may refer to:

- George Edmund Badger (1795–1866), U.S. senator from the state of North Carolina
  - USS George E. Badger
  - SS George E. Badger
- George Percy Badger (1815–1888), English Anglican missionary and scholar of oriental studies

== See also ==
- Badger (surname)
