= USS Badger =

Three ships of the United States Navy have been named Badger:

- USS Badger (1889), an auxiliary cruiser purchased in 1898 and used in the Spanish–American War
- USS Badger (DD-126), a Wickes-class destroyer commissioned in 1919 and active during World War II
- USS Badger (FF-1071), a Knox-class destroyer escort commissioned in 1970, reclassified as a frigate in 1975 and decommissioned in 1991

== See also ==
- USS George E. Badger (DD-196)
- USS Charles J. Badger (DD-657)
- SS Badger, a ferry
