= Admiral Badger =

Admiral Badger may refer to:

- Oscar Charles Badger II (1890–1958), admiral of the U.S. Navy
- Charles Johnston Badger (1853–1932), admiral of the U.S. Navy
