= Oscar Badger =

Oscar Badger may refer to:

- Oscar C. Badger II (1890–1958), United States Navy admiral and Medal of Honor recipient
- Oscar C. Badger (1823–1899), his grandfather, United States Navy officer
