= Badger (surname) =

Badger is a surname. Notable people with the surname include:

- Alexis Badger (1974–1989), birth name of American murder victim Aundria Bowman
- Clarissa Munger Badger (1806–1889), American botanical artist
- Colin R. Badger (1906–1993), Australian adult education administrator
- Elijhah Badger (born 2001), American football player
- George Edmund Badger (1795–1866), U.S. Senator from North Carolina
- George Percy Badger (1815–1888), English Anglican missionary and scholar of oriental studies
- Henry Badger (1900–1975), English cricketer
- Joseph Badger (ca. 1707–1765), American portrait artist
- Len Badger (1945–2021), English footballer for Sheffield United 1962–1976
- Luther Badger (1785–1869), US congressman from New York
- Michelle Badger, American politician
- Owen Badger (1871–1939), Wales national rugby player
- Pat Badger (born 1967), American musician
- Richard McLean Badger (1896–1974), American spectroscopist
- Ruth Badger (born 1978), British reality television contestant and TV presenter
- Steve Badger (poker player), American poker player
- Steve Badger (swimmer) (born 1956), Australian and later Canadian swimmer
- Tabatha Badger, Australian politician
- William Badger (1779–1852), American politician, governor of New Hampshire
- William Badger (shipbuilder) (1752–1830), American shipbuilder in Kittery, Maine
