= USS Badger (FF-1071) =

United States Navy frigate

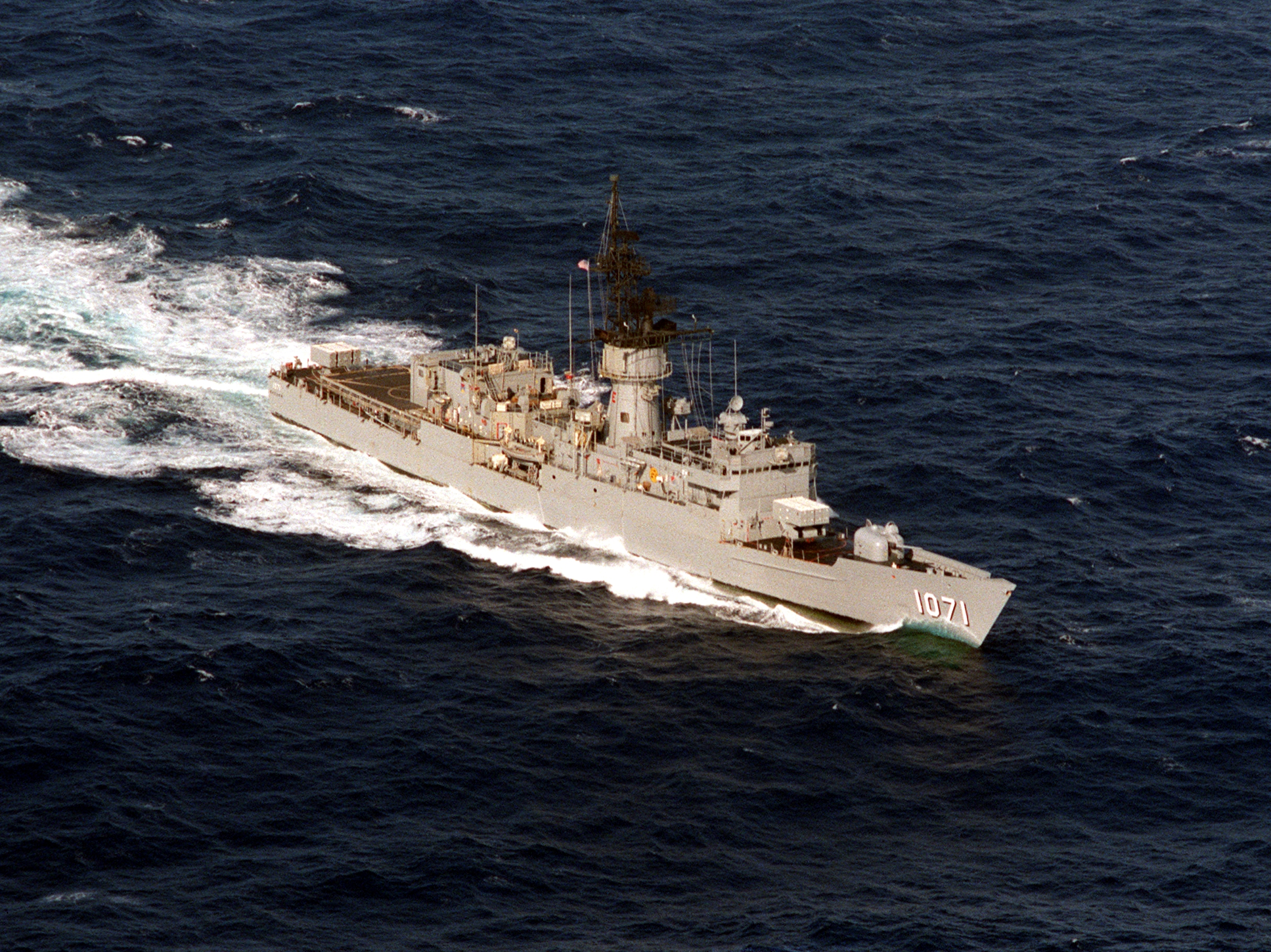
- USS Badger (FF-1071)

History

United States
- Name: Badger
- Ordered: 22 July 1964
- Builder: Todd Shipyards, Los Angeles Division, San Pedro, California
- Laid down: 17 February 1968
- Launched: 7 December 1968
- Acquired: 20 November 1970
- Commissioned: 1 December 1970
- Decommissioned: 20 December 1991
- Stricken: 11 January 1995
- Motto: Honor, Duty, Valor
- Fate: Sunk as a target, 22 July 1998

General characteristics
- Class & type: Knox-class frigate
- Displacement: 3,249 tons (4,245 full load)
- Length: 438 ft (133.5 m)
- Beam: 46 ft 9 in (14.2 m)
- Draft: 24 ft 9 in (7.5 m)
- Propulsion: 2 × CE 1200psi boilers; 1 Westinghouse geared turbine; 1 shaft, 35,000 shp (26,000 kW)
- Speed: over 27 knots (50 km/h)
- Range: 4,500 nautical miles (8,300 km) at 20 knots (37 km/h)
- Complement: 18 officers, 267 enlisted
- Sensors & processing systems: AN/SPS-40 Air Search Radar; AN/SPS-67 Surface Search Radar; AN/SQS-26 Sonar; AN/SQR-18 Towed array sonar system; Mk68 Gun Fire Control System
- Electronic warfare & decoys: AN/SLQ-32 Electronics Warfare System
- Armament: one Mk-16 8 cell missile launcher for ASROC and Harpoon missiles; one Mk-42 5-inch/54 caliber gun; Mark 46 torpedoes from four single tube launchers); one Mk-25 BPDMS launcher for Sea Sparrow missiles
- Aircraft carried: one SH-2 Seasprite (LAMPS I) helicopter

USS Badger (DE-1071/FF-1071) was a Knox-class frigate in service in the United States Navy from 1970 to 1991. She was sunk as a target in 1998.

== History ==
The first Badger (DD-126) was named for Commodore Oscar C. Badger (a cousin of Secretary of the Navy George Edmund Badger), the father of Rear Admiral Charles J. Badger, the son of the commodore and the father of the admiral, was also honored by the naming of the destroyer Charles J. Badger (DD-657) (q.v.), and the grandfather of Admiral Oscar C. Badger. This Badger (FF-1071) honors all four men.

=== Commissioning ===
Badger was laid down on 17 February 1968 at Todd Shipyards, Los Angeles Division, San Pedro, California; launched on 7 December 1968; sponsored by Mrs. Oscar C. Badger; and commissioned at Long Beach, California, on 1 December 1970.

Badger completed fitting out at the Long Beach Naval Shipyard in January 1971 and then spent most of the spring engaged in tests and shakedown training. She completed final contract trials in May, during which Badger set the speed record for Knox class frigates, over 30 knots. The following month, entered the Long Beach Naval Shipyard for post-shakedown availability. During that availability, she received extensive modifications including the addition of a basic point defense missile system (BPDMS) and of an independent variable depth sonar system. Because of those changes, Badger underwent a post-shakedown availability that lasted until mid-November. From that time until mid-March 1972, the destroyer escort conducted a series of underway tests and training evolutions and underwent readiness inspections. On 16 March 1972, she weighed anchor and stood out of Long Beach on her way to the Far East. Along the way, Badger stopped at Pearl Harbor, Midway, and Guam before arriving in Subic Bay on 7 April.

=== 1970s ===
On the following evening, Badger stood out of Subic bound for the Vietnam War zone. She arrived in Danang, South Vietnam, two days later and, after a four-hour layover, again got underway, bound for the northern gunline near the mouth of the Cua Viet River. She began gunfire support missions on the 11th and, on the 13th, received her first counterbattery fire. Two days later, she suffered superficial damage from a communist shore battery after her 5-inch (127 mm) had been put out of action by a fouled bore and an overheated barrel. Later that day, the ship headed back to Danang to have her 5-inch gun barrel replaced by the repair ship USS Hector. She returned to sea on the 16th and soon arrived back on the gunline. On the 19th, Badger was switched to plane guard duty for the aircraft carrier USS Constellation in the Gulf of Tonkin. That assignment lasted two days short of a month. On 17 May, destroyer escort USS Albert David relieved her, and Badger shaped a course for Sasebo, Japan.

==== 1972 ====
Following a week of availability and liberty, Badger departed Sasebo on 29 May 1972 and, on 2 June, joined guided missile cruiser USS Sterett (CG-31) on the middle sea-air rescue (SAR) station in the Gulf of Tonkin. Four days later, however, she was reassigned to plane guard duty, this time for the ASW support carrier USS Ticonderoga (CV-14) . After spending 20 days supporting the carrier, Badger returned to gunfire support missions on 26 June. On 7 July, the warship resumed plane guard duties, this time for the carrier USS Midway, and departed Vietnamese waters in company with that carrier. The following day, the ships moored in Subic Bay.

Following upkeep, Badger headed back to the combat zone on 17 July 1972. Two days later, she resumed gunfire support duties. During that assignment, the ocean escort joined five other American ships in providing gunfire support for operations carried out in Military Region II by the South Vietnamese Army's 22d Division. On 9 August, she was assigned duty interdicting communist waterborne logistics and remained so engaged until 12 August when she relieved guided missile frigate USS Worden as plane guard for Midway, once again headed for Subic Bay. The two ships reached their destination on 14 August but departed again the next day bound for Hong Kong. Badger conducted an upkeep and liberty period at that port from 17 to 23 August and got underway on the latter day to return to the Philippines. She arrived in Subic Bay on 24 August for repairs before putting to sea on the 30th, bound for Vietnamese waters.

Upon her return to the combat zone, the warship took up position as escort for the guided missile cruiser USS Long Beach on the middle SAR station. During that tour of duty, she also kept an eye on two Chinese merchantmen in the area. When the guided missile frigate USS Gridley relieved Long Beach, Badger continued on station until 10 September, when she was relieved of middle SAR station escort duties by her sister ship USS Hepburn and proceeded to rendezvous with the carrier USS Hancock. Badger provided plane guard services for the carrier as she made her final air strikes of the war and then escorted Hancock to Subic Bay, arriving there on 15 September. After four days in port, the destroyer escort put to sea and shaped a course for Yokosuka, Japan, where she made an overnight stop on 22 and 23 September before setting sail for the United States in company with Hancock. After a nonstop voyage across the Pacific, highlighted by several fueling-at-sea operations, Badger arrived back in Long Beach on 4 October. The usual post-deployment stand-down ensued as did a restricted availability at the Todd Shipyard in Los Angeles, California. The latter began on 8 January 1973 and included the conversion of her main propulsion system to Navy distillate fuel and the installation of a light airborne multipurpose system (LAMPS).

==== 1973–1975 ====
Badger completed those modifications on 18 May 1973 and put to sea for trials and single ship exercises in the southern California operating area. Normal west coast operations out of Long Beach occupied her time until 9 July, the day she got underway for her new home port, Pearl Harbor, Hawaii. The warship made the voyage in six days, entering Pearl on 14 July. Training in the Hawaiian operating area occupied her until early September. On 11 September, Badger put to sea to participate in the four-nation Exercise RIMPAC '73. However, a material casualty to her evaporators forced her to return to port for repairs on the 15th. She was back at sea the following afternoon; rejoined the exercise; and, following its conclusion, returned to Pearl on 21 September. Three days later, she set sail for Long Beach and arrived there on 1 October. The ship's crew then enjoyed a 16-day liberty call before the ship began her second deployment on the 17th.

Badger rendezvoused with the carrier USS Oriskany to form Task Group (TG) 37.4, and the two ships then shaped a course for the western Pacific. Augmented en route by the remainder of Destroyer Squadron (DesRon) 35, TG 37.4 reached Subic on 5 November 1973. On the 9th, Badger departed Subic Bay in company with destroyer escort USS Brewton and ammunition ship Kiska bound for the Persian Gulf and the CENTO Exercise MIDLINK '73. On the way, the ships stopped at Singapore. They arrived at Bandar Abbas, Iran, on the 23d. From that port, she participated in MIDLINK '73 until its conclusion on 2 December. After a brief liberty call at Bandar Abbas, Badger got underway on the 3rd to return to the Philippines, again in company with Brewton and Kiska. The voyage included another visit to Singapore, and Badger reentered Subic Bay on 21 December 1973. She immediately began a repair and upkeep period that lasted until 20 January 1974, when she headed for Guam. Four days later, the destroyer escort arrived at Guam whence she conducted special operations. Badger remained in the Mariana Islands until 13 February when she departed Guam to return to Subic Bay. The warship steamed into that port on 17 February and, for the next month, conducted training operations in local waters.

On 18 March 1974, Badger put to sea from Subic Bay for a series of port calls beginning with a stop at Hong Kong from 21 March to 1 April. From there, she moved to Keelung, Taiwan, for a visit between 3 and 8 April. On the 9th, she moored in the harbor at Kaohsiung, Taiwan, for an eight-day stay before returning to Subic on the 18th. From 22 to 27 April, she operated in the South China Sea shadowing two Soviet submarines. She returned to Subic on the 27th and remained there until 5 May when the destroyer escort began the voyage back home to Hawaii. After a stop at Guam, she reached Pearl Harbor on 18 May.

Following leave and upkeep, Badger got underway for tests on her main propulsion plant and associated equipment on 21 June 1974. She returned to Pearl that night and remained in port until returning to sea on 11 July for final tests. During the full power run, the ship suffered a casualty to her low pressure turbine and was taken in tow by the large harbor tug Waxahachie. Later, USS Reclaimer relieved Waxahachie and pulled the stricken destroyer escort into Pearl Harbor on the morning of the 12th. The warship underwent a restricted availability at the Pearl Harbor Naval Shipyard lasting until late October and resumed normal operations in the Hawaiian Operating Area in November. That employment occupied her for the last two months of 1974 and for the first two months of 1975. On 11 March 1975, she put to sea to participate in Exercise RIMPAC '75, the multifaceted combat readiness exercise that brought together units of the American, Australian, Canadian, and New Zealand navies. The exercise concluded on 21 March, and Badger returned to Pearl Harbor to prepare for overseas movement.

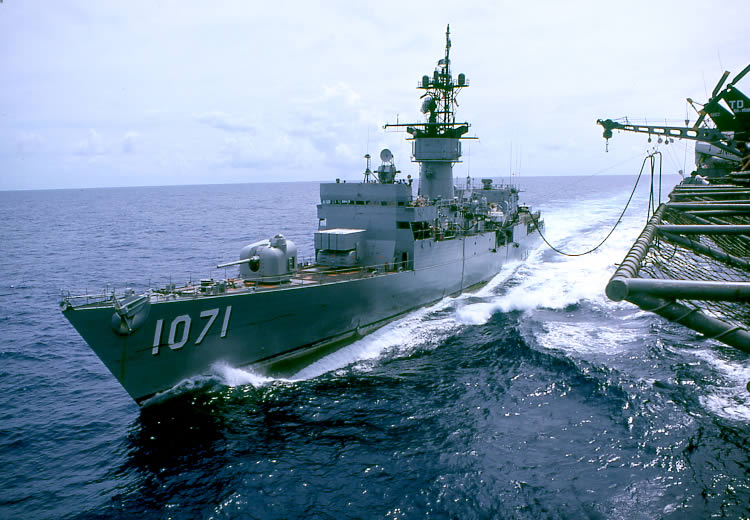
Badger being refueled by the carrier Midway in the South China Sea in 1975.

Badger put to sea on 17 April to rendezvous with sister ship USS Harold E. Holt and guided missile destroyer escort USS Schofield, and Kiska for the voyage to the western Pacific. The task group stopped at Guam for fuel on 28 April but, immediately after completing the operation, continued on to Subic Bay where, after a short diversion to the South China Sea to assist in the evacuation of Vietnam, they arrived on 4 May. The next day, Badger was back at sea escorting Midway to Guam with a load of American aircraft removed from Vietnam. The two warships arrived there on 11 May, unloaded the planes, and returned to sea on the 12th. En route back to Subic Bay, she received orders diverting her to assist in the recovery of the American container ship SS Mayagüez that had been seized by the Cambodians. The merchantman, however, was freed before Badger's arrival on the scene, and the escort resumed her original course and reentered Subic Bay on the 17th. She spent two days escorting Hancock in the local operating area before returning to port on 22 May. After a week of upkeep, she put to sea for Guam. Arriving in Apra Harbor on 2 June to begin another period of upkeep, she remained there until 13 June when she put to sea for special operations in company with Brewton.

Badger returned to Guam on 22 June, spent three days there, and headed back to Subic Bay on the 25th. On the last day of the month, she put to sea as a unit of TG 75.1 to begin a 60-day training cruise to the Indian Ocean. One day out, on 1 July 1975, Badger was reclassified a frigate and redesignated FF-1071. That extended voyage brought exercises of all types: refueling, replenishment, towing, communications, gunnery, and engineering. She also made port calls at Singapore, Port Louis in Mauritius, Mombasa in Kenya, Karachi in Pakistan, and Colombo in Sri Lanka. The ship concluded that voyage at Subic Bay on 11 September. Upkeep there, including a period in drydock, lasted until 29 September. On 1 October, Badger headed to Hong Kong. She arrived there on 3 October and with the exception of two days at sea from 5 to 7 October to evade a typhoon, remained in port until the 9th when she shaped a course for Guam. The warship arrived there on 15 October for two weeks of upkeep and operations locally for sea trials. On 29 October. She set a course for Pearl Harbor and pulled into her home port on 8 November. Her post-deployment standdown period was followed, in turn, by a holiday leave and upkeep period.

==== 1976–1979 ====
During the first five months of 1976, Badger alternated training operations at sea with periods in port at Pearl Harbor preparing for her first regular overhaul. Late in May, the crew moved off the ship to quarters ashore; and, on 7 June, the ship officially commenced overhaul at the Pearl Harbor Naval Shipyard. This work occupied her for the remainder of 1976 and through the first few days of 1977. She emerged from the yard on 11 January 1977 and conducted sea trials the following day. Further trials, inspections, and readiness ensued. In July, she began refresher training that lasted until the first week in August when she returned to Pearl Harbor.

Badger got underway for the west coast of the United States in company with DesRon 23 on 22 August 1977. Throughout the passage across the eastern Pacific, she joined the ships of DesRon 23 in a number of exercises. She arrived in San Diego, California, on the last day of August and remained in port until 9 September at which time she put to sea to participate in local operations with San Diego–based units of the Fleet. Badger returned to San Diego on the 15th and stayed until the 19th when she returned to sea for Exercise Varsity Spirit conducted along the California coast. At the conclusion of that exercise, she headed back to Pearl where she arrived on 1 October and began preparations for overseas movement.

On 2 November 1977, Badger departed Pearl Harbor in company with USS Kitty Hawk and the other units of DesRon 25 bound for the western Pacific. The warships arrived in Yokosuka exactly three weeks later after an exercise-filled passage. Throughout that deployment, she conducted exercises with units of Allied navies as well as with 7th Fleet units. She also made goodwill visits to Singapore and various Japanese and Korean ports. The frigate also frequently called at Subic Bay for upkeep and replenishment. She concluded the deployment at Pearl on 8 May 1978. Post-deployment standdown lasted until mid-June at which time she resumed local operations in the Hawaiian Islands.

Badger spent the next nine months engaged in exercises and drills conducted out of Pearl Harbor. On 17 March 1979, the warship departed her home port in company with Brewton, USS Rathburne, USS Ramsey, and USS Lynde McCormick, bound for another tour of duty with the 7th Fleet. After pausing at Guam for fuel on 29 March, the warships pulled into Subic Bay on 4 April and spent the rest of the month alternating exercises in the local operating area with periods of upkeep in port. During the first half of May, she joined Brewton and Rathburne in a round-trip voyage to Hong Kong for a goodwill and liberty call. Late in May and early in June, Badger operated with a task group in the South China Sea before returning to Subic Bay on the 11th. With the exception of a three-day period at sea in the local operating area, she spent the remainder of June in upkeep and preparations for an extended cruise to the Indian Ocean.

Badger departed Subic Bay on 1 July 1979 in company with Brewton, Rathburne, and USNS Mispillion. The task group stopped at Singapore for a four-day port visit before transiting the Strait of Malacca on 8 July and entering the Indian Ocean, where intensive exercises and drills in all facets of ship's operations highlighted periods at sea punctuated by visits to Colombo, Sri Lanka, and Mombasa. The latter stages of the operation were conducted in the Gulf of Aden and in the Gulf of Oman. The task group exited the Indian Ocean via the Strait of Malacca on 29 August and headed for the Gulf of Siam where it joined units of the Thai Navy for Exercise Sea Siamex X.

At the conclusion of that exercise on 7 September, the ships made a four-day visit to Pattaya Beach, Thailand, before shaping a course for the Philippines. En route, Badger was detached from the task group to proceed to Luzon independently. However, before reaching port, she was further diverted on a humanitarian mission: the rescue of 14 Vietnamese refugees adrift in a small boat. She finally arrived in Subic Bay on 15 September, all refugees safe.

=== 1980s ===
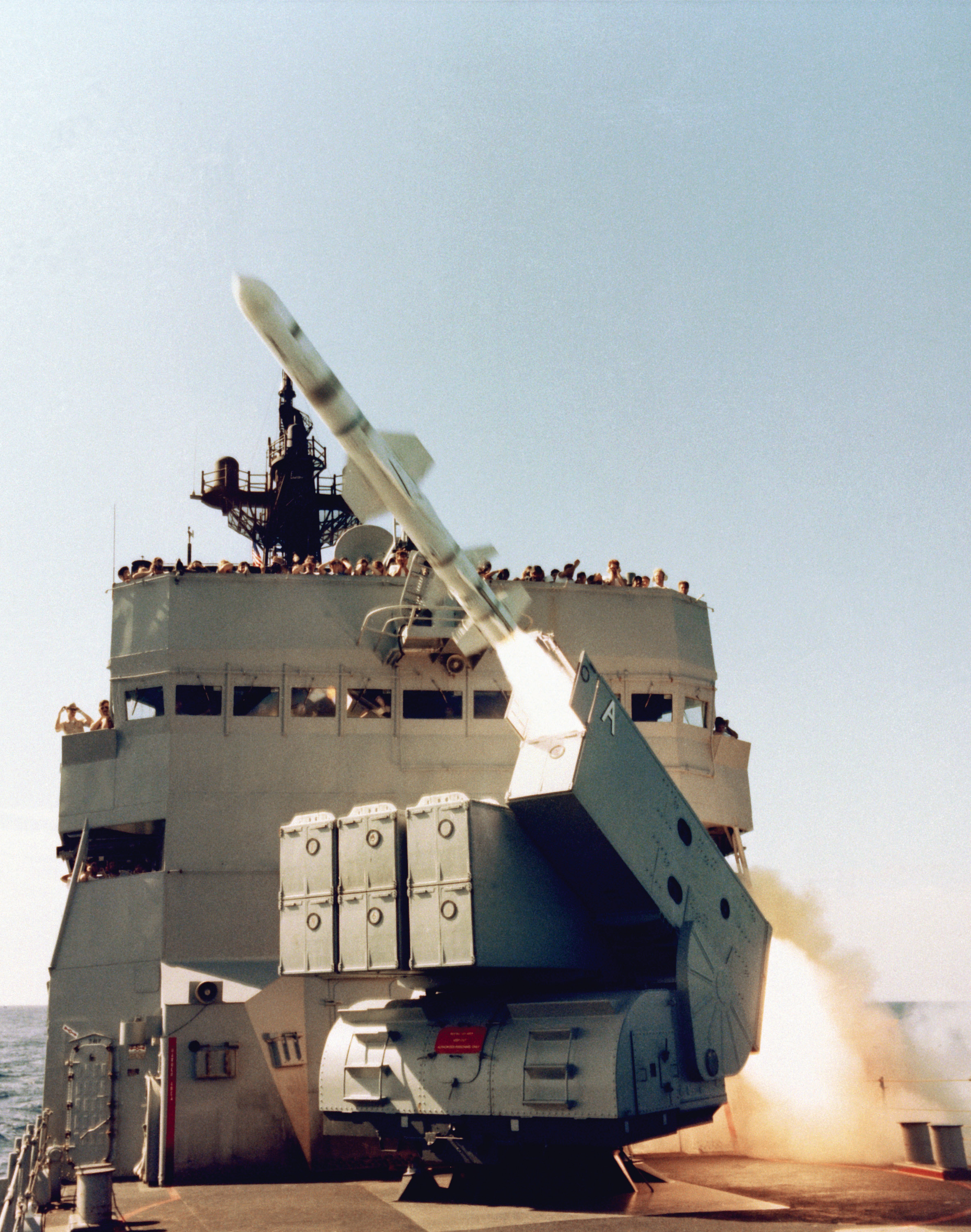
Badger test-firing a Harpoon anti-shipping missile in 1980.

Badger remained at Subic less than a week; she got underway on the 21st, bound for Hawaii in company with Brewton and Rathburne. They stopped for fuel at Guam and Midway before arriving back in Pearl Harbor on 4 October. Following post-deployment standdown, the frigate resumed local operations out of Pearl late in December. On 7 January 1980, Badger began a seven-week availability at the Pearl Harbor Naval Shipyard. Her repairs were completed on 27 February, and she began sea trials in the local area. Over the next six months, Badger went through the usual trials and certifications as well as all types of exercises and drills. In mid-August, she began pre-deployment training with a carrier task group formed around USS Ranger. That training complete, the task group returned to Pearl Harbor on 23 September for a final liberty call before heading for the Far East.

On 26 September, Badger departed Pearl Harbor in company with the Ranger task group bound for an extended assignment with the 7th Fleet. The warships entered Subic Bay on 15 October, and Badger began a 10-day availability. Late in the evening of the 26th, she put to sea to rendezvous with the rest of the Ranger task group. On 30 October, the ships began the transit of the Strait of Malacca and, the next day, entered the Indian Ocean, the appearance of this task group in the Indian Ocean reflecting the seizure of the American embassy in Tehran by Iranian militants almost a year before and the holding of embassy personnel as hostages. Though the task group never entered the Persian Gulf, its training evolutions kept it within rapid steaming time of that troubled area. Badger and the task group remained in the Indian Ocean through the end of the year and into 1981 conducting intensive training of all types including multilateral exercises with Allied navies.

==== 1981–1983 ====
Iran's release of the American hostages occurred on 19 January 1981, but Badger and the task group to which she was assigned, continued training evolutions in the Indian Ocean for eight weeks thereafter. On 11 March, group retransited the Strait of Malacca and left the Indian Ocean behind. The warships reentered Subic Bay on 23 March, and Badger began a 12-day upkeep. Just under a month later on 16 April, the Ranger task group put to sea to return to Hawaii. After 12 days at sea, the frigate reentered her home port on 28 April. During the month of May, the warship combined the customary post-deployment standdown period with preparations for the periodic visit by the inspection and survey team. After the team's visit early in June, Badger resumed normal training duty in the Hawaiian operating area. That employment lasted through the summer and ended in September with her entry into the Pearl Harbor Naval Shipyard for overhaul.

The period in the 'yard occupied Badger for the remainder of 1981 and the first quarter of 1982. She did not put to sea again until late May when she began refresher training, inspections, examinations, and certifications. From then on, the frigate busied herself with the never-ending cycle of readiness exercises and drills punctuated by the usual material inspections and proficiency examinations. She continued so engaged for the rest of 1982 and the first five weeks of 1983. On 8 February 1983, Badger embarked on a six-week cruise to the west coast in company with some other DesRon 25 units: USS Cochrane, USS Gray, and USS Lang. After completing a COMPTUEX, a READIEX, and a naval gunfire support requalification, Badger returned to Hawaii on 21 March and began a month of preparations for overseas movement. The frigate stood out of Pearl Harbor with USS Elliot and USS Brooke on 24 April. The three warships then carried out several exercises near Kauai on the Pacific missile range before beginning their voyage to the Far East on the 26th.

After a passage that included a variety of drills and exercises and a five-day layover at Guam for a short availability, Badger reached Manila on 16 May 1983. Underway again on short notice, leaving behind some 52 men who had been on leave and liberty at the time of her sailing, she carried out surprise ASW operations west of Subic Bay between the 18th and the 20th, retrieving four of her men via the aircraft carrier USS Coral Sea on the latter date, and then headed for a liberty call at Hong Kong, where the remainder of the men left behind at her hurried departure joined her via the command ship USS Blue Ridge. Back at sea on 27 May, the warship conducted further ASW work in the South China Sea until the end of the month. Badger made a short stop at Subic Bay for fuel on 1 June and then set out for Japan. She took part in an amphibious exercise along the way near Okinawa before arriving in Yokosuka on 16 June. She spent eight days in repairs at Yokosuka and then set a course back to the South China Sea where she carried out surveillance missions until the latter part of July. Badger then returned to Subic Bay where she made voyage repairs and requalified in naval gunfire support on the nearby Tabones range. On 27 July, she headed back to Yokosuka where she underwent still more repairs during the first 10 days of August.

Badger returned to sea on 11 August 1983, and took up surveillance duty again, this time in the Sea of Japan. She concluded that assignment on 2 September and shaped a course for Sasebo, but received orders the following day to proceed north in the wake of the tragic downing, by a Soviet fighter, of Korean Air Lines Flight 007 over Sakhalin Island on 1 September. Rear Admiral William A. Cockell, Commander, Task Force 71, and a skeleton staff, embarked in Badger on 9 September via LAMPS helo from Wakanai, Japan, for further transfer to the destroyer Elliot to assume duties as Officer in Tactical Command (OTC) of the Search and Rescue (SAR) effort. During the forenoon watch on 17 September, however, Badger's embarked SH-2F helicopter from HSL-37 (Detachment 2) went down at sea; USCGC Munro, however, promptly rescued the four-man crew from the water. Badger ended her part in the KAL 007 SAR effort on the 20th and reached Yokosuka on the 21st to prepare for the voyage back to Hawaii. That journey began on 23 October and included participation in Exercise Battle Week 84-1 followed by a visit to nearby Apra, Guam, before Badger finally managed to return home on Armistice Day 1983. Admiral William J. Crowe, Jr., Commander in Chief, U.S. Pacific Command, visited the ship on 29 November and congratulated the ship's officers and men on their recent deployment, emphasizing their role during the KAL 007 SAR operation. Post-deployment leave and upkeep and holiday standdown, broken only by a brief period underway on 20 and 21 December to escort USS Swordfish as she operated locally, kept Badger in port at Pearl for the rest of 1983.

==== 1984–1985 ====
Badger got underway for the first time in 1984 on 9 January when she put to sea for three days of tests and training with USS Omaha (SSN-692). Following an inspection and survey to gauge her fitness for further service, she began a two-month restricted availability. On 21 March, she finished the repair work and launched into a succession of post-availability trials, inspections, examinations, and certifications that continued through the middle of June. After that came refresher training in the local operating area until late July. On the 20th, Badger stood out of Pearl in company with USS Joseph Strauss and Amphibious Squadron (PhibRon) 5 for six weeks of drills and exercises in the waters along the west coast. She returned to Hawaii at the end of August and then, except for 17 days in drydock between 28 September and 15 October, spent September and October engaged in normal operations in Hawaiian waters.

During the last week in October, Badger took part in the first phase of a major fleet exercise with a pair of carrier task groups built around USS Constellation and USS Carl Vinson. After spending the period 2 to 6 November in port at Pearl Harbor, she returned to sea to conclude the exercise and then move on to the Far East for seven weeks of additional exercises. Travelling with the Carl Vinson task group, she participated in a series of training evolutions conducted in such diverse places as the Marianas, in the Philippine Sea, and in Japanese waters. Badger completed her part in the exercises early in December and, after a visit to Yokosuka, Japan, set out on the voyage back to Hawaii on the 13th in company with Joseph Strauss. The two warships reentered Pearl Harbor on 22 December, and Badger spent the rest of 1984 in port.

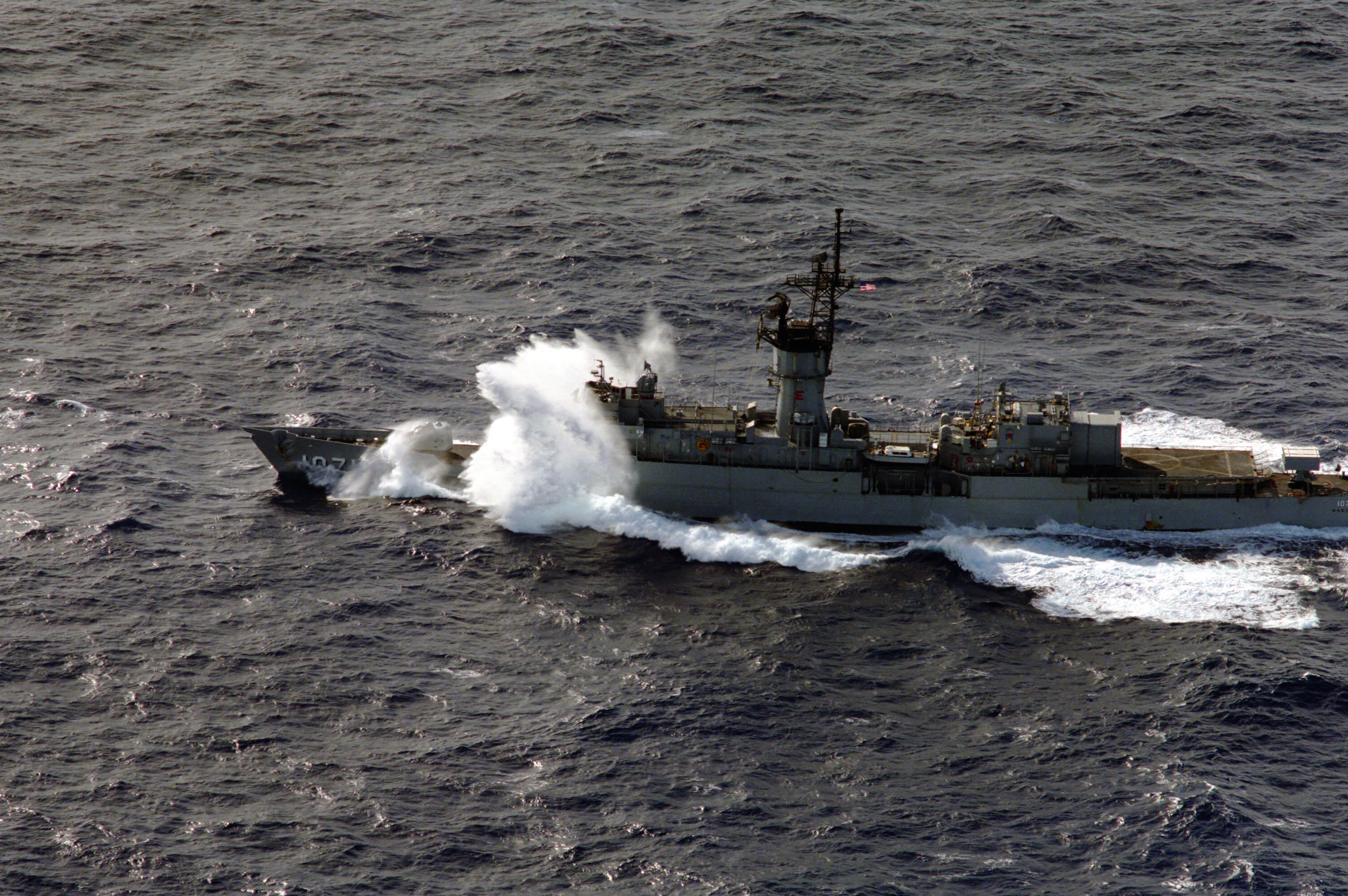
Badger in heavy seas in 1985.

Following an unusually brief standdown, Badger resumed operations very early in 1985. She put to sea on 10 January for a two-week cruise to conduct operations in an area in the eastern Pacific about two-thirds of the way from Oahu to the northern California coast. She returned to Hawaii from that mission on 24 January and settled into more than two months of local operations out of Pearl Harbor. Then, after a special assignment in the vicinity of Midway Island early in April, Badger completed a four-week restricted availability at Pearl Harbor. On 11 May, the frigate headed for the eastern Pacific once more. This time, however, she made it all the way to the west coast and took part in several exercises conducted in the southern California operating area. Concluding a four-week absence, Badger returned to Oahu on 14 June and began preparations to deploy overseas.

After six weeks of getting ready, Badger stood out of Pearl Harbor on 2 August and joined the Orient-bound task group built around USS Kitty Hawk) the next evening. The exercise-filled, 17-day passage to the Philippines ended on the 19th at Subic Bay where Badger began five days of repairs and meetings before heading to duty in the Indian Ocean and the Arabian Sea on 24 August. Along the way, she and USS Horne parted company with the task group to transit the Malacca Strait and conduct Exercise MERLION 85 with units of the Singapore Navy on 29 and 30 August. The two warships rejoined the task group in the Bay of Bengal on 1 September and, after recovering debris from a helicopter crash, resumed the voyage to the Arabian Sea. Badger reached the patrol area in the northern Arabian Sea on 10 September and began four weeks of duty on that station. Early in October, she made a five-day port visit at Mombasa and then sailed back to the Arabian Sea, where she completed a tender availability alongside USS Ajax at Al Masirah Island. Early in November, she called at Karachi, Pakistan, for a goodwill visit and carried out an ASW exercise with units of the Pakistani Navy. On 17 November, she rejoined the Kitty Hawk task group again south of Sri Lanka on its way back to Subic Bay. The task group remained at Subic for six days before setting out on the voyage back to Hawaii on 1 December.

==== 1986–1989 ====
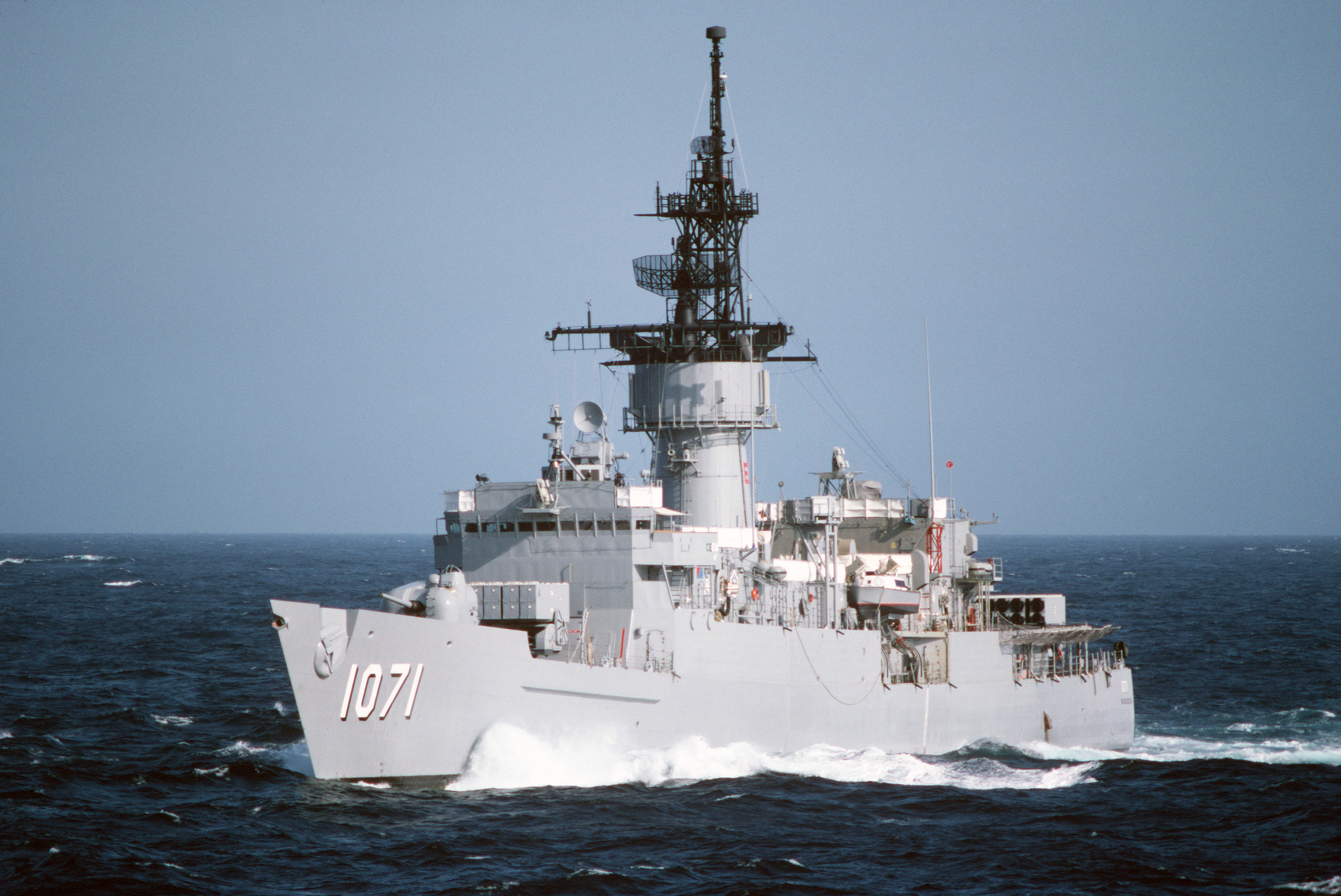
Badger on a midshipmen's summer training cruise in 1986.

Reaching Pearl Harbor on 12 December 1985, Badger spent the rest of that year and the first weeks of 1986 in port engaged, at first, in post-deployment and holiday standdown and, later, carrying out a six-week availability. She put to sea for the first time after her return on 1 February to participate in readiness exercises near Kauai. Similar training activities in the local operating area kept her busy until the second week in April. At that time, Badger stood out of Pearl Harbor for a six-week goodwill cruise to the South Pacific. During the voyage, she called at Pago Pago and Apia in the Samoan Islands, Nukualofa and Vavau in the Tonga Islands, and Funafuti in the Tuvalu Islands before returning to Hawaii by way of Apia. The warship arrived back in Pearl Harbor on 12 May and began a four-week period of relative inactivity in port. Early in June, she put to sea to participate in a phase of the multinational exercise RIMPAC 86 and then returned to Oahu on the 14th to prepare for an extended training cruise to the west coast. On 23 June, Badger embarked on the seven-week round of exercises punctuated with visits to west coast ports that constituted EASTPAC 86. During that space of time, she visited Vancouver in British Columbia and the California ports of San Francisco and San Diego before returning to Hawaii on 9 August.

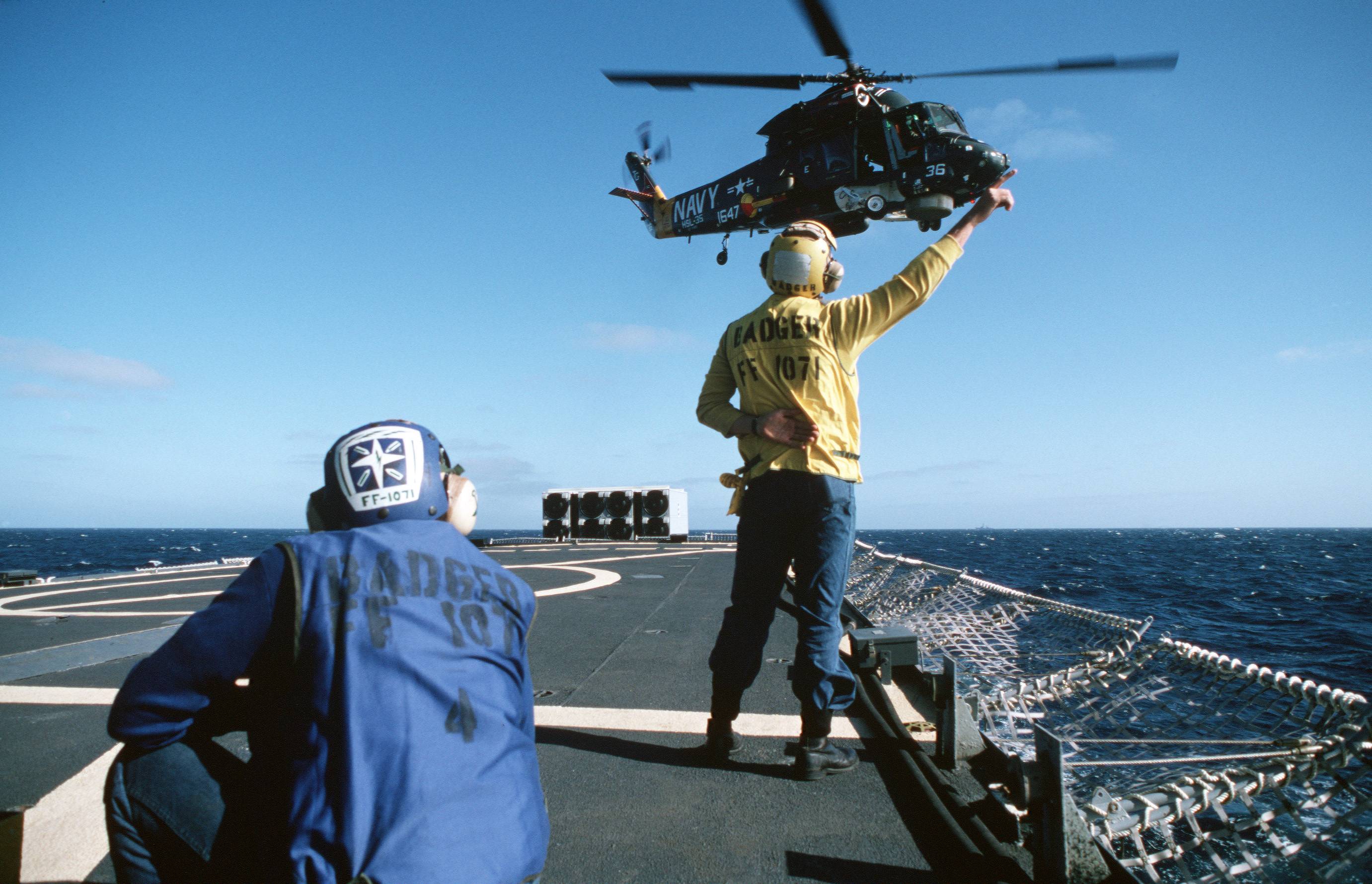
Badger launching a SH-2 Seasprite helicopter during anti-submarine warfare exercises in 1986.

For the remainder of 1986, the warship went to sea only rarely. She carried out some ASW exercises late in August and then spent five weeks in a maintenance availability. She returned to sea in mid-October for engineering drills and again early in November for more of the same and to complete a propulsion plant certification examination. When she reentered Pearl Harbor on 14 November, Badger started preparing for a three-month drydocking that began on 8 December. Although refloated on 2 March 1987, she did not resume active service for almost two more months. The repair work continued through March and during the first two weeks of April; and, although she returned to sea on two occasions during the second part of April, it was only for brief sea trials. Badger finally took up a more active schedule late in May with helicopter landing qualifications on the 20th and 21st and evolutions at sea during the last days of the month in connection with her material readiness inspection. In June, the frigate resumed a normal schedule of local training operations and continued so engaged for the rest of 1987.

Badger continued to carry out training missions in the Hawaiian operating area well into 1988. Late in March, she embarked on a series of battle readiness exercises that carried out during a four-week cruise to the west coast. The warship returned to Pearl Harbor from that assignment at the end of April and then spent the following five weeks in port. She resumed local training missions on 9 June, but those lasted less than a fortnight. On 22 June, Badger stood out of Pearl Harbor on her way to the Far East as part of a task group built around Carl Vinson. Though she made most of the crossing with the task group, Badger did not remain a part of it throughout the deployment. She parted company with the unit on 4 July and headed for Japan, arriving in Yokosuka on the 16th. After five days of repairs and upkeep, the frigate set sail for the Philippines on 22 July. She reached Subic Bay on the 27th but remained only three days, putting to sea again on the 30th bound for Singapore. Her visit to Singapore, however, proved a brief one, shortened by orders on 6 August to rescue Vietnamese refugees in the vicinity of the Spratly Islands. On the 9th, Badger took on board 57 survivors of a group that had originally numbered 104 and sailed for the Philippines. The tragedy of this rescue was that it resulted in only 57 people survived by any means necessary. Some of the crew witnessed that acts of cannibalism had taken place.

The warship disembarked the refugees at Subic Bay on the 10th and, after several days of upkeep, set out for Japan again. During the remainder of August and the first part of September, Badger called at a succession of Japanese ports. On 12 September, she put to sea from Yokosuka for two weeks of operations in the East China Sea with a task group formed around Midway. She then visited Pusan, South Korea, on 28 and 29 September, before returning to sea for two weeks of surveillance operations in the Sea of Japan. In mid-October, the frigate visited Chinhae, Korea, for five days and then carried out four days of training with units of the South Korean Navy. Next came a call each at Pusan in late October and at Hong Kong early in November. Badger returned to Subic Bay on 11 November and made preparations for the voyage back to Hawaii. The last 7th Fleet assignment of her Navy career came to an end on 22 November when she embarked on that final western Pacific passage.

The warship returned to Pearl Harbor on 6 December 1988 and her post-deployment standdown lasted until 17 January 1989. She then resumed local operations in the Hawaiian Islands on a schedule that kept her moderately busy through the end of May. On 30 May, the frigate began an availability with a civilian contractor that lasted nearly four months. Badger completed the repairs on 24 September, carried out the usual trials and examinations in October, and resumed normal training missions out of Pearl Harbor early in November. She remained so occupied for the rest of 1989 and well into 1990.

=== 1990s ===
Late in March 1990, however, Badger undertook a new mission when she embarked a Coast Guard law enforcement detachment to carry out drug traffic interdiction operations. Her first taste of law enforcement duty lasted from 28 March to 12 April and then she resumed more familiar duty until mid-June. On 18 June, she embarked another Coast Guard detachment and set sail for the west coast to conduct another series of drug traffic interdiction missions in the eastern Pacific out of San Diego. That deployment lasted until the beginning of September when she transferred her helicopter detachment (HSL-37 Detachment 10) to USS Ouellet and disembarked the Coast Guardsmen at San Francisco. Badger arrived back at Oahu on 11 September and began a restricted availability on the 20th that immobilized her for most of the months remaining in 1990.

Badger took up active training again early in December 1990; but that lasted only about two weeks. The relative inactivity of holiday leave and upkeep commenced in mid-December and continued for about a month. In mid-January 1991, the warship resumed local training operations and pursued them until early June. During June and early July, Badger voyaged to the west coast one last time before being deactivated. She visited San Diego, California, Portland, Oregon, and Homer, Alaska before returning to Oahu on 16 July. Once back in Pearl, the frigate did not get underway again except to shift berths. Badger was decommissioned at Pearl Harbor on 20 December 1991, and her name was struck from the Naval Vessel Register in January 1995. The former warship performed her last service for the Navy on 22 July 1998 at which time she was sunk as a target during the United States Third Fleet exercise RIMPAC 98 at 22°51′06″N 160°33′00″W.

Badger earned one battle star during the Vietnam War.
