= Oscar C. Badger =

United States Navy commodore (1823–1899)

Commodore Oscar Charles Badger
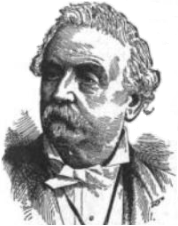
- Born: August 12, 1823; Mansfield, Connecticut
- Died: June 20, 1899 (aged 75); Concord, Massachusetts
- Burial place: Arlington National Cemetery
- Relatives: George Edmund Badger (cousin); Charles Johnston Badger (son); Oscar C. Badger II (grandson)
- Military career
- Allegiance: United States of America
- Branch: United States Navy
- Service years: 1841–1885
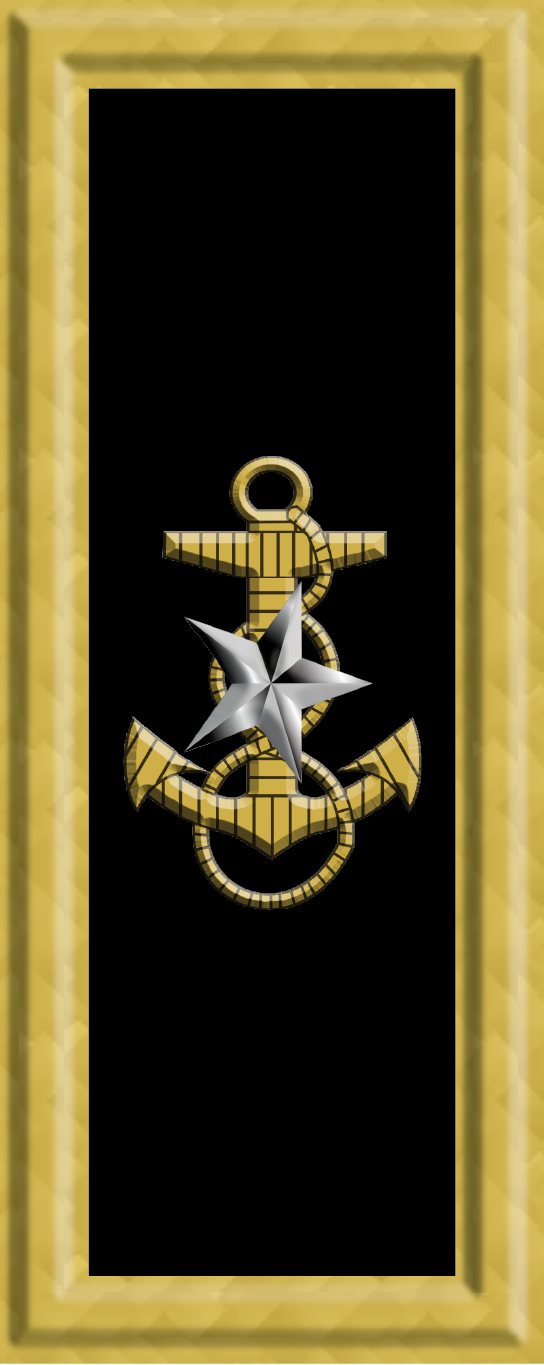
- Rank: Commodore
- Commands: USS Anacostia; USS Patapsco; USS Montauk; USS Peoria; USS Ticonderoga; USS Ohio; USS Constitution
- Conflicts: Ivory Coast Expedition; Mexican–American War; American Civil War

Commodore Oscar Charles Badger (August 12, 1823 – June 20, 1899) was an officer of the United States Navy who served in the Mexican–American War and the American Civil War.

== Service in Africa and during the Mexican–American War ==
Badger received an appointment as a midshipman in the United States Navy on September 9, 1841, and, after a tour of duty in the Independence, served in Saratoga along the Atlantic coast of Africa. While serving in the latter ship, he saw his first action in the punitive expedition that landed on the west coast of Africa in 1843 and destroyed the Berribee villages. In the sidewheel steamer Mississippi, during the Mexican–American War, he participated in the expedition that captured the Mexican town of Alvarado in the spring of 1847.

== Attended the Naval Academy at Annapolis, Maryland ==
Badger then attended the Naval School (as the Naval Academy was then called) at Annapolis, Maryland; completed his course of study there; and was warranted a passed midshipman on August 10, 1847.

== Posted to the Pacific Squadron ==
By 1850, he was posted to the Pacific Squadron and served successively in the Supply, the frigate Savannah, and the sloop Vincennes. He returned to shore in 1853 for a tour of duty at the United States Naval Observatory located in Washington, D.C. In 1855, he returned to the Pacific Squadron for duty in the sloop John Adams and, that autumn, participated in an expedition to the Fiji Islands to redress wrongs suffered by members of the crews of American whalers and merchant ships at the hands of natives. The landing party destroyed the village of Vutia. To round out his pre-Civil War service, Badger was assigned in turn to the Plymouth, Macedonian, Minnesota, and, lastly, to the Washington Navy Yard.

== Service in the American Civil War ==
He was serving in the national capital at the outbreak of the Civil War, and took command of the screw steamer Anacostia early in the conflict. In her, he participated in a series of actions against Confederate batteries along the Virginia bank of the Potomac River. During the Peninsula Campaign, he took part in the siege of Yorktown, Virginia. In 1862, he was transferred to the western theater to superintend the arming of river gunboats. In mid-1863, he was switched to the South Atlantic Blockading Squadron and participated in the attack on shore batteries on Morris Island on July 11, 1863. A week later, he commanded Patapsco in an attack on Fort Wagner and, a month after that, led the ironclad in a series of operations against Forts Wagner, Gregg, and Sumter. On the night of August 22, 1863, he took command of the ironclad Montauk on another assault on Fort Sumter.

=== Appointed fleet captain of the South Atlantic Blockade ===
Soon thereafter, Badger was appointed fleet captain, ad interim, of the South Atlantic Blockading Squadron and, in that office, took part in another attack on Fort Sumter while in the flagship Weehawken on the night of September 1, 1863. During that action, he was severely wounded in the leg by a flying metal splinter.

He spent the remaining years of the Civil War ashore performing ordnance duty at the Philadelphia Navy Yard and serving as inspector of cannon at Pittsburgh, Pennsylvania. After the war, he became a companion of the District of Columbia Commandery of the Military Order of the Loyal Legion of the United States.

== Post-Civil War service with the fleet ==
On December 26, 1866, he took command of the newly commissioned sidewheel steamer USS Peoria—a ship of the North Atlantic Squadron—and, in her, rendered assistance to the victims of a fire that destroyed Basseterre on St. Kitts in the Leeward Islands. The Peoria was decommissioned in September 1867. In 1868, he was assigned to equipment duty at the Portsmouth Navy Yard in New Hampshire. He returned to sea in 1871 in command of the Ticonderoga of the South Atlantic Fleet. He commanded the receiving ship Ohio at Boston, Massachusetts, in 1873 and 1874 and served again at the Washington Navy Yard between 1875 and 1878.

== Final military service ==
Badger's last sea duty came in 1878 and 1879 when he commanded the frigate Constitution. He commanded Constitution on a voyage to France to represent the United States Navy at the Paris Exposition of 1878. The voyage, beset by several mishaps, lasted from March 1878 to May 1879. During 1880, he was stationed in Washington for special duty. While serving at the Naval Asylum in Philadelphia, Badger was promoted to commodore in November 1881.

After commanding the Boston Navy Yard between 1881 and 1885, Badger retired in August 1885. He died on June 20, 1899, in Concord, Massachusetts, and was buried at Arlington National Cemetery, in Arlington, Virginia.

== Family ==
Badger married Margaret M. Johnston, daughter of Captain Z. F. Johnston, USN. Their son, Charles Johnston Badger, pursued a naval career and retired as a rear admiral.

== Memberships ==
Commodore Badger was a member of the Aztec Club of 1847, the Military Order of the Loyal Legion of the United States and the Military Order of Foreign Wars.

== Honored in ship naming ==
The Badger (Destroyer No. 126) (1919–1945) was named for Commodore Oscar C. Badger, while his son, Admiral Charles Johnston Badger was similarly honored by the naming of the destroyer Charles J. Badger (DD-657) (1943–1957). The destroyer escort Badger (DE-1071) (subsequently rerated as a frigate) (1970–1991) honors the commodore, his son, his grandson, Admiral Oscar C. Badger II, and his cousin George Edmund Badger, the 12th United States Secretary of the Navy.

== See also ==
- Mexican–American War
- American Civil War
- Oscar C. Badger II
