= USS Peoria (1863) =

Gunboat of the United States Navy

History

United States
- Name: USS Peoria
- Builder: New York Navy Yard
- Launched: 29 October 1863
- Commissioned: 26 December 1866
- Decommissioned: 5 September 1867
- Fate: Sold, 26 August 1868

General characteristics
- Class & type: Sassacus-class gunboat
- Displacement: 974 long tons (990 t)
- Length: 235 ft 6 in (71.78 m)
- Beam: 35 ft (11 m)
- Draft: 9 ft 3 in (2.82 m)
- Complement: 137
- Armament: 4 × 8 in (200 mm) Dahlgren smoothbores; 2 × 60-pounder Parrott rifles; 2 × 24-pounder Dahlgren howitzers; 2 × 20-pounder Dahlgren howitzers

The first USS Peoria was a double-ended sidewheel steamer in the United States Navy.

Peoria was built at the New York Navy Yard; launched on October 29, 1863, and commissioned on December 26, 1866, Commander Oscar C. Badger in command.

Assigned to the North Atlantic Station, Peoria got underway from New York on January 6, 1867, for shakedown along the southeast coast. Returning to Hampton Roads, Virginia on March 12, she sailed on April 14 for the West Indies.

Touching at the Virgin Islands, Santo Domingo, Haiti, Puerto Rico, and the Leeward Islands, she then turned north to Hampton Roads before dropping anchor at Portsmouth, New Hampshire on July 28, 1867. Peoria decommissioned there on September 5, 1867, and was sold on August 26, 1868. The USS Peoria is named after Peoria Illinois.
