= Charles Johnston Badger =

U.S. Navy admiral (1853–1932)

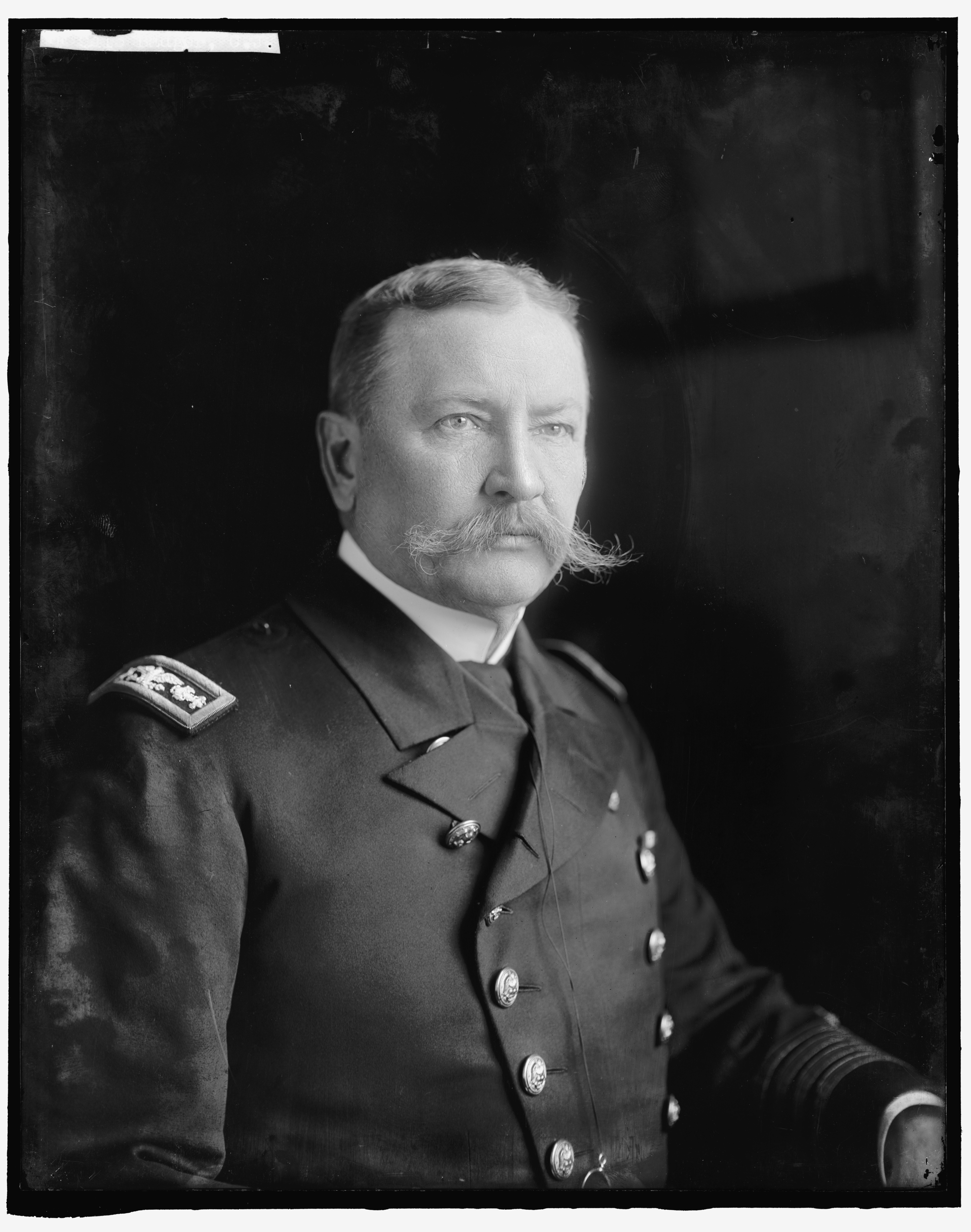
- Born: August 6, 1853; Rockville, Maryland, US
- Died: September 8, 1932 (aged 79); Blue Ridge Summit, Pennsylvania, US
- Burial place: Arlington National Cemetery
- Relatives: George E. Badger (cousin); Oscar C. Badger II (son); Oscar C. Badger (father)
- Military career
- Allegiance: United States of America
- Branch: United States Navy
- Service years: 1873–1921
- Rank: Rear Admiral
- Commands: U.S. Atlantic Fleet; 2nd Division, Atlantic Fleet; USS Kansas (BB-21)
- Conflicts: Spanish–American War; World War I
- Awards: Navy Distinguished Service Medal

Charles Johnston Badger (August 6, 1853 – September 8, 1932) was an rear admiral in the United States Navy. His active-duty career included service in the Spanish–American War and World War I.

== Early life and education ==
The son of Commodore Oscar C. Badger (1823–1899), Charles Badger was born August 6, 1853, in Rockville, Maryland. He attended the United States Naval Academy, having received an at-large appointment from President Ulysses S. Grant in 1869. Badger graduated eighth in his class on May 31, 1873. He later attended the Naval War College from July to August 1897.

== Career ==
Badger's first assignment was aboard the screw sloop USS Narragansett from September 1873 to July 1875. After a year at sea, he was commissioned as an ensign in July 1874. From April to November 1884, Badger served as executive officer of HMS Alert during the Greely relief expedition.

Badger served on the cruiser USS Cincinnati during the Spanish–American War, and climaxed his career as Commander in Chief, Atlantic Fleet. He served as superintendent of the U.S. Naval Academy from 1907 to 1909.

Badger was promoted to captain on July 1, 1907. He commanded the battleship USS Kansas from 1909 to 1911. Badger was promoted to rear admiral on March 8, 1911, and given command of the 2nd Division, U.S. Atlantic Fleet with his flag on the battleship USS Louisiana.

During the Tampico Affair, Rear Admiral Badger commanded the U.S. Atlantic Fleet with his flag on the battleship USS Wyoming. He became a member of the Navy General Board in 1914.

Badger was retired on August 6, 1915, having reached the mandatory retirement age of sixty-two. Because of World War I, he remained on active duty until February 28, 1921, having received special authorization through a naval appropriation bill provision.

He was an hereditary companion of the District of Columbia Commandery of the Military Order of the Loyal Legion of the United States as well as a member of the District of Columbia Society of the Sons of the American Revolution.

He was also a member of the Aztec Club of 1847 and served as its vice president from 1919 to 1920 and as its president from 1920 to 1921 and 1922 to 1923.

== Family ==
Badger married Sophia Jane Champlin (1860–1923) on October 4, 1882 and had two children.

Their daughter was Elizabeth Champlin Badger (1883–1966), who married Rear Admiral H. F. Bryan, USN. They had two children.

Their son was Oscar Charles Badger II (1890–1958) who received the Medal of Honor for heroism at Vera Cruz in 1914 and went on to serve in both world wars. He retired from the Navy as an admiral in 1952.

Rear Admiral Badger was a cousin of Secretary of the Navy George E. Badger (1790–1865).

== Awards ==
- Navy Distinguished Service Medal
- Sampson Medal
- Spanish Campaign Medal
- World War I Victory Medal

== Death and legacy ==
A resident of Washington, D.C., Rear Admiral Badger died September 8, 1932 in Blue Ridge Summit, Pennsylvania, and is buried in Arlington National Cemetery.

Two Navy ships have been named in his honor: USS Charles J. Badger (DD-657), and USS Badger (FF-1071).

== See also ==
- List of superintendents of the United States Naval Academy

Academic offices
Preceded by James H. Sands	Superintendent of United States Naval Academy; 1907–1909	Succeeded by John M. Bowyer
Military offices
Preceded by Hugo Osterhaus	Commander in Chief, United States Atlantic Fleet; 1913–1914	Succeeded by Frank F. Fletcher
