= SS George E. Badger =

World War II Liberty ship of the United States

History

United States
- Name: George E. Badger
- Namesake: George Edmund Badger
- Builder: North Carolina Shipbuilding Company, Wilmington, North Carolina
- Laid down: 27 December 1942
- Launched: 26 January 1943
- Fate: Scrapped, 1972

General characteristics
- Type: Liberty ship
- Tonnage: 7,000 long tons deadweight (DWT)
- Length: 441 ft 6 in (134.57 m)
- Beam: 56 ft 10.75 in (17.3419 m)
- Draft: 27 ft 9.25 in (8.4646 m)
- Propulsion: 2 × oil-fired boilers; Triple-expansion steam engine, 2,500 hp (1,864 kW); single screw
- Speed: 11.5 knots (21.3 km/h; 13.2 mph)
- Capacity: 9,140 tons cargo
- Complement: 41
- Armament: 1 × 4 in (100 mm) deck gun; Variety of anti-aircraft guns

SS George E. Badger (Hull Number 884) was a Liberty ship built in the United States during World War II. She was named after George Edmund Badger, a North Carolina Senator from 1846 to 1855 and Secretary of the Navy in 1841.

The ship was laid down on 27 December 1942, then launched on 26 January 1943. George E. Badger was operated by Grace Line under charter with the Maritime Commission and War Shipping Administration. George E. Badger took part in "Operation Overlord", the invasion of Normandy in June 1944. The ship survived the war only to suffer the same fate as nearly all other Liberty ships that survived did; she was scrapped in 1972.
