= Henry Badger =

English cricketer

Henry Dixon Badger (7 March 1900 – 10 August 1975) was an English amateur first-class cricketer, who played in four matches for Oxford University in 1921, and made two appearances for Yorkshire in 1921 and 1922, during which he scored six runs and took six wickets for 145 runs at 24.16 each. A right arm fast bowler, he took 15 wickets for his University against the Army, Cambridge University, Sussex and Surrey at an overall average of 21.66, with a best of 4 for 53. He scored 33 runs, with a top score of 17 not out, for an average of 11.00. He played at least twice for Yorkshire Second XI.

Born in Clifton Green, York, Badger was subsequently a schoolmaster at Denstone College, Sedbergh and Barnard Castle.

He died, aged 75, in August 1975 in Barnard Castle, County Durham.
