= George Edmund Badger =

American Secretary of the Navy and senator for North Carolina (1795–1866)

George Badger
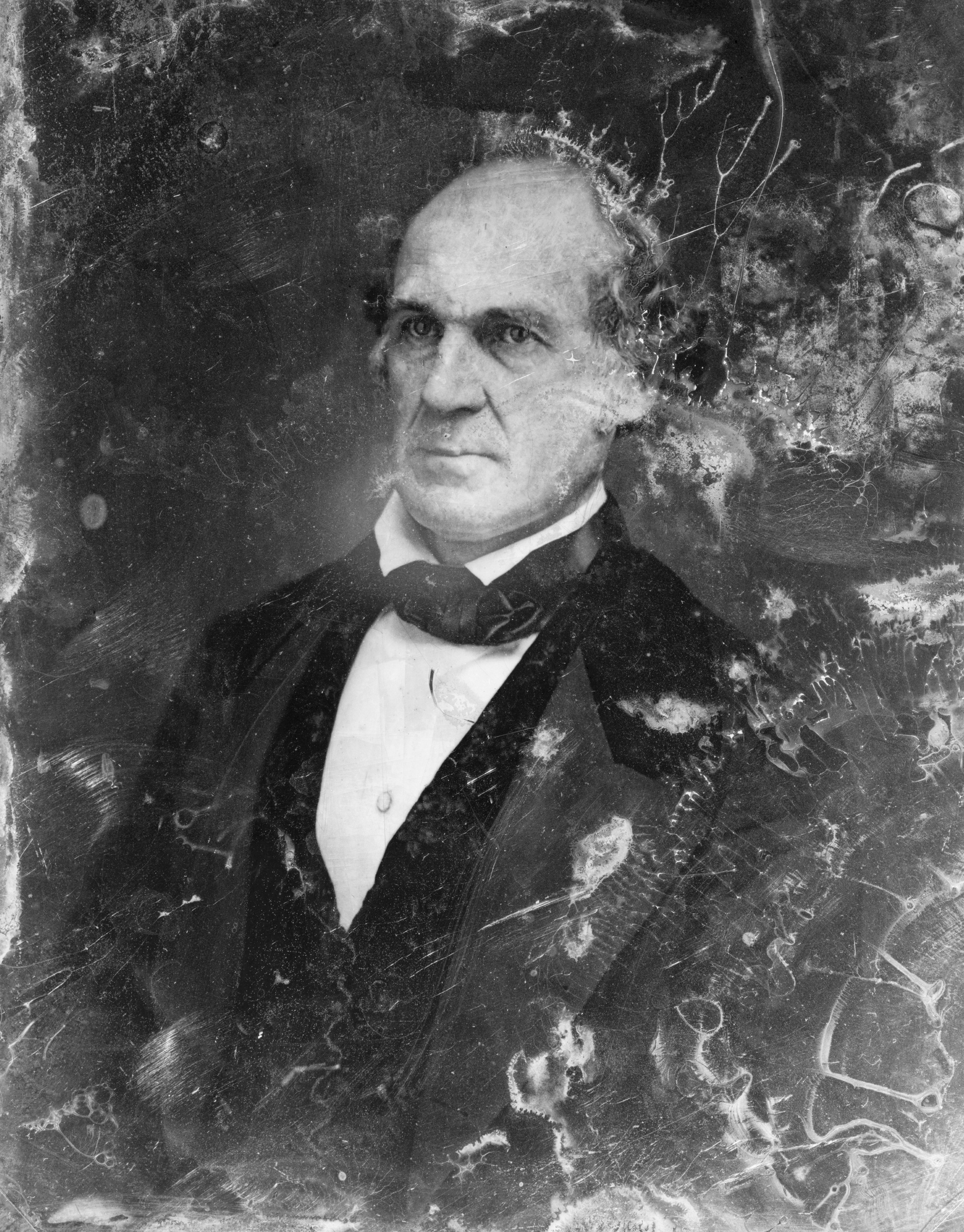
- Badger, 1844–1860

United States Senator from North Carolina
- In office November 25, 1846 – March 3, 1855
- Preceded by: William Haywood
- Succeeded by: Asa Biggs

12th United States Secretary of the Navy
- In office March 6, 1841 – September 11, 1841
- President: William Henry Harrison; John Tyler
- Preceded by: James Paulding
- Succeeded by: Abel Upshur

Personal details
- Born: April 17, 1795 New Bern, North Carolina, U.S.
- Died: May 11, 1866 (aged 71) Raleigh, North Carolina, U.S.
- Party: Federalist; Whig
- Spouse(s): Rebecca Turner (1818–1824); Mary Brown Polk (1808–1835); Delia Haywood Williams (1836–1866)
- Education: Yale University (no degree)

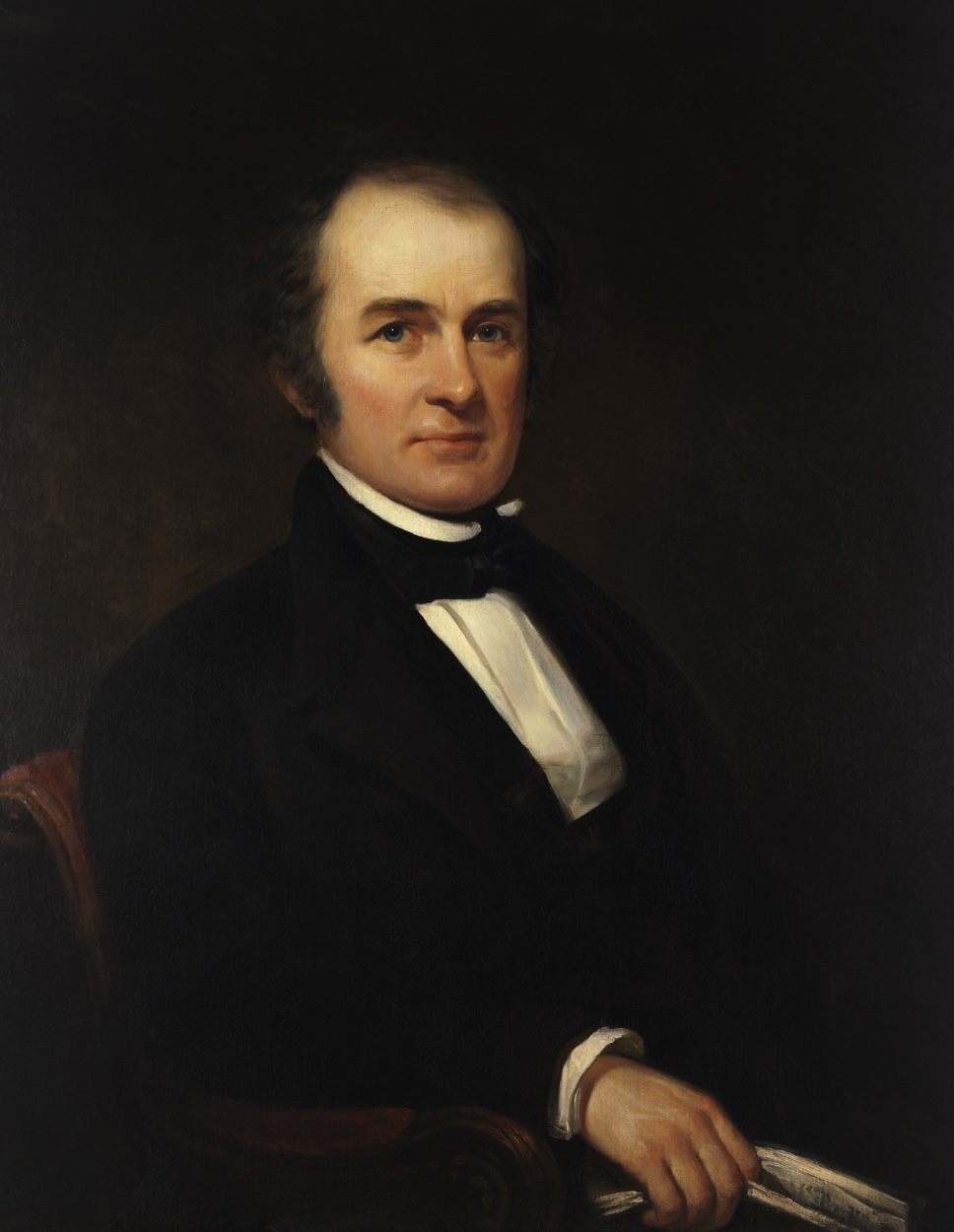
Portrait of George Edmund Badger, by James Bogle, c. 1853

George Edmund Badger (April 17, 1795 – May 11, 1866) was an American politician who served as a Whig U.S. senator from the state of North Carolina. He also served as Secretary of the Navy.

== Early life ==
Badger was born on April 17, 1795, in New Bern, North Carolina. He attended Yale College (where he was a member of Brothers in Unity) and received a partial college education that was terminated due to lack of funds; afterwards, he studied law and was admitted to the bar in 1814.

== Career ==
Badger practiced law in North Carolina, was active in state politics, and served as a state superior court judge. A supporter of Andrew Jackson from the 1820s, he separated with him in the mid-1830s, became a leader of the Whig party and helped carry the Whigs to victory in the 1840 Presidential election.

Upon taking office, President William Henry Harrison appointed Badger as his Secretary of the Navy, and he continued in that post for a few months (until September 1841, when he resigned to resume private practice) when John Tyler succeeded to the Presidency upon Harrison's death (April 1841). Badger's brief term as Secretary was marked by efforts to strengthen the Navy in the face of tension with Great Britain, the establishment of the U.S. Home Squadron, and growing interest in steamships.

Badger resigned in September 1841, during a general cabinet shakeup. The resignation of several cabinet members, including Badger, resulted from Tyler's vetoing of two bills to create a new national bank, which the Whig party, led by Henry Clay, supported. Badger was elected to the U.S. Senate in 1846 to fill the unexpired term of William Henry Haywood, Jr. and remained in office until 1855, after choosing not to run for re-election. While in the Senate, he supported the Compromise of 1850.

He was nominated by President Millard Fillmore as an Associate justice of the Supreme Court on January 3, 1853, to succeed John McKinley. On February 11, 1853, the Senate voted to postponed the nomination, and the president withdrew it three days later.

Badger's wealth grew throughout his political career; by 1860, he was worth an estimated $145,000 (~$4.12 million in 2024). He was a slave owner, enslaving twenty people. He was a Unionist during the secession crisis but thereafter supported the Confederate war effort.

== Death and legacy ==
Badger died in Raleigh, North Carolina, in 1866.

Two Navy ships have been named in honor of Senator Badger: USS George E. Badger (DD-196), and USS Badger (FF-1071). A Liberty ship, the SS George E. Badger, also was named in his honor. Badger was a cousin of naval officers Oscar C. Badger, Charles J. Badger and Oscar C. Badger II.

Political offices
Preceded by James Paulding	United States Secretary of the Navy; 1841	Succeeded by Abel Upshur
U.S. Senate
Preceded by William Haywood	U.S. Senator (Class 1) from North Carolina; 1846–1855; Served alongside: Willie Mangum, David Reid	Succeeded by Asa Biggs
Preceded by Thomas Rusk	Chair of the Joint Enrolled Bills Committee; 1850–1851	Succeeded by George Wallace Jones
