= USS Charles J. Badger =

Fletcher-class destroyer

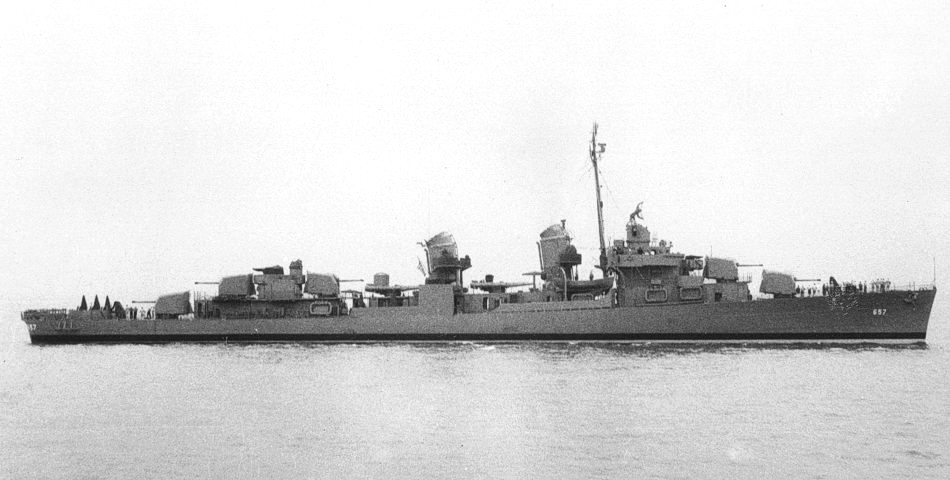
- USS Charles J. Badger (DD-657) in July 1943

History

United States
- Namesake: Charles J. Badger
- Builder: Bethlehem Shipbuilding Company, Staten Island
- Laid down: 24 September 1942
- Launched: 3 April 1943
- Commissioned: 23 July 1943
- Decommissioned: 20 December 1957
- Stricken: 1 February 1974
- Fate: Sold to Chile for parts, 10 May 1974

General characteristics
- Class & type: Fletcher-class destroyer
- Displacement: 2,050 tons
- Length: 376 ft 6 in (114.7 m)
- Beam: 39 ft 8 in (12.1 m)
- Draft: 17 ft 9 in (5.4 m)
- Propulsion: 60,000 shp (45 MW); 2 propellers
- Speed: 35 knots (65 km/h; 40 mph)
- Range: 6500 nm at 15 kn; (12,000 km at 28 km/h)
- Complement: 319
- Armament: 5 × 5-inch 38 caliber guns, 4 × 40 mm AA guns, 4 × 20 mm AA guns, 10 × 21-inch (533 mm) torpedo tubes, 6 × depth charge projectors, 2 × depth charge tracks

USS Charles J. Badger (DD-657) was a Fletcher-class destroyer of the United States Navy, named for Rear Admiral Charles J. Badger (1853–1932), whose service included the Spanish–American War and World War I.

Charles J. Badger was launched 3 April 1943 by Bethlehem Steel Co., Staten Island, N.Y., sponsored by Miss I. E. Badger and commissioned 23 July 1943.

== Service history ==
=== World War II ===
Charles J. Badger arrived at San Francisco, Calif. 30 November for Pacific duty, and on 17 December 1943 reported at Adak, Alaska for patrol and escort duty around the Aleutians until August 1944. During this time, she helped keep the Japanese unaware of the United States' strategic intentions involving the western Aleutians and from February to June, contributed to bombardments in the Kuril Islands. On 8 August, she sailed to San Francisco and Pearl Harbor to join an assault convoy and sailed on 14 October for the Philippines campaign.

Entering Philippine waters, she escorted transports during the assault landings at Dulag, Leyte, on 20 October 1944. On the eve of the Battle for Leyte Gulf, Badger guarded the retirement of empty transports to New Guinea then returned to Leyte convoying reinforcements. In December, she reported in Huon Gulf, New Guinea, for rehearsals of the Lingayen landings, for which she sailed 27 December. On 8 January 1945, as she entered Lingayen Gulf, her convoy was attacked by Japanese kamikazes, one of which crashed into Kitkun Bay. Two days later Charles J. Badger escorted Kitkun Bay to San Pedro, then took up patrol duties.

After a period at Ulithi, Badger returned to Leyte to rehearse for the landings on the Kerama Retto, a preliminary to the assault on Okinawa. Badger arrived on 26 March 1945 to guard the landings, which took the Japanese by surprise. This did not prevent them from mounting suicide air attacks, during which Badger claimed a kamikaze. Once the landings on Okinawa began, the destroyer took position to guard the southern flank of the landings. On 7 April she joined a force moving north to intercept the last Japanese naval force; Yamato and Yahagi with eight destroyers. However, an attack by carrier aircraft sank Yamato, Yahagi and all but four of the destroyers before the surface forces could engage.

In the early morning on 9 April, while on her fire support station, a Japanese army Maru-ni, suicide boat, dropped a depth charge close to the ship, off Okinawa in position. 26°18′N 127°39′E The explosion knocked out Badger's engines and caused significant flooding. Damage control work minimised the flooding and a tug brought the destroyer to Kerama Retto. After temporary repairs, she proceeded for an overhaul to Bremerton, Washington, arriving on 1 August. On 21 May 1946 she was placed out of commission and in reserve at Long Beach, California

=== 1951-1957 ===
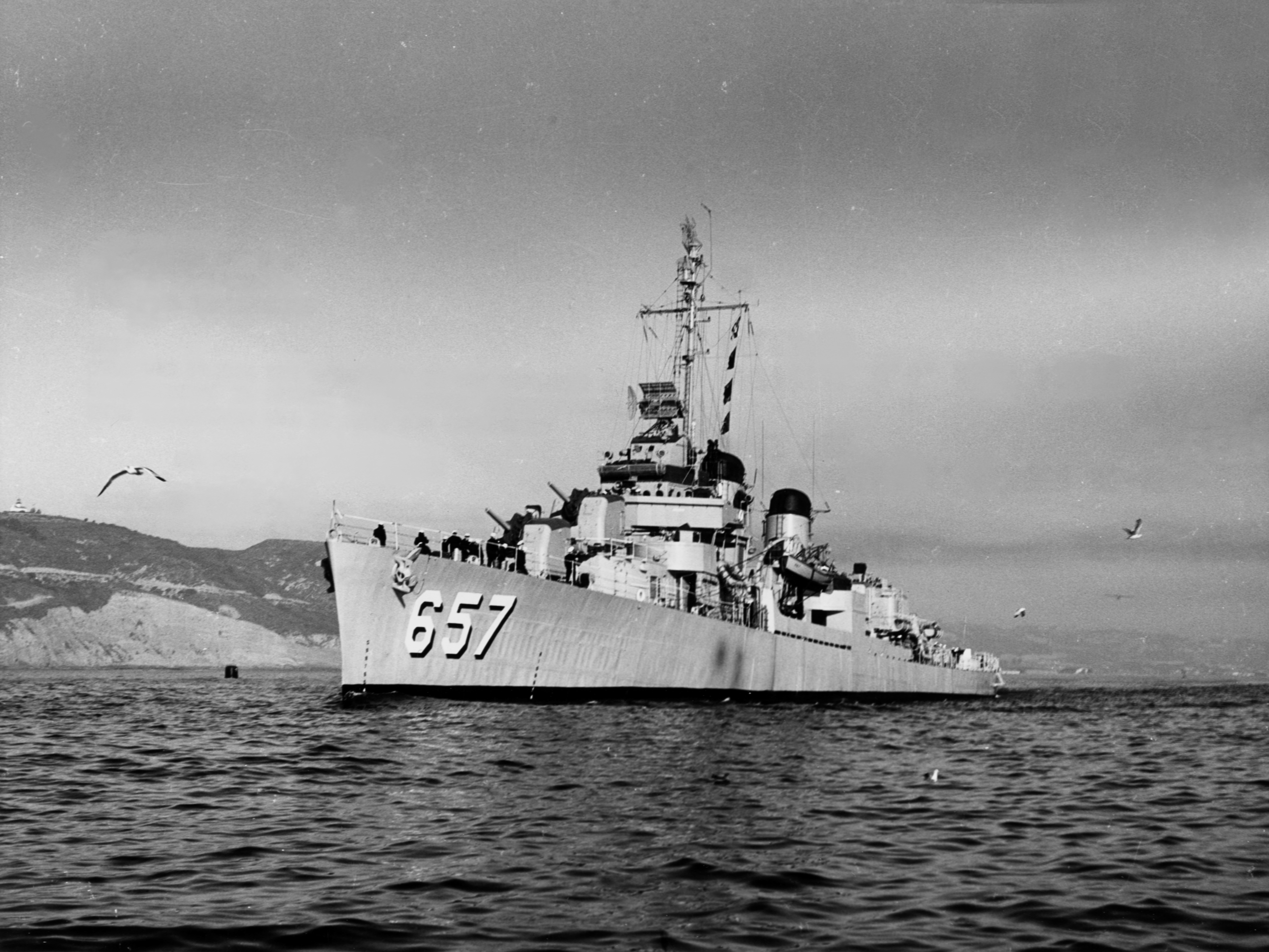
Charles J. Badger after being recommissioned, circa 1951.

Charles J. Badger was recommissioned 10 September 1951, and in February 1952 arrived at her new home port, Newport, R.I. From this base, she operated along the east coast and in the Caribbean, maintaining and providing services for the training of other types. Her first Atlantic crossing came from 9 June to 23 July 1953, when she sailed to visit Portsmouth, England, in company with two aircraft carriers and another destroyer. On 7 December, she cleared Newport on the first leg of a round the world cruise, which found her operating for 2 months on patrol off the Korean coast and in the Taiwan Straits. She escorted transports bringing prisoners of war who had elected to join the Chinese Nationalists from Inchon to Taiwan and took part in training operations off Japan until 22 May 1954, when she continued on around the world. Visits at Hong Kong, Singapore, Colombo, Aden, Port Said, Naples, Villefranche-sur-Mer, and Lisbon, through the Suez Canal and the Mediterranean to Newport, where she arrived 17 July.

Badger completed two tours of duty with the 6th Fleet in the Mediterranean in early 1956 and in late 1956-early 1957, during the second of which she patrolled during the Suez Crisis. Badger was decommissioned and placed in reserve at Boston, Mass. 20 December 1957.

The ship was stricken from the Naval Vessel Register 1 February 1974, sold 10 May 1974 to Chile and cannibalized for spare parts.

== Awards ==
She received five battle stars for World War II service.

== See also ==
- USS Badger
