= Oscar C. Badger II =

US Navy admiral and Medal of Honor recipient (1890–1958)

Oscar Charles Badger II
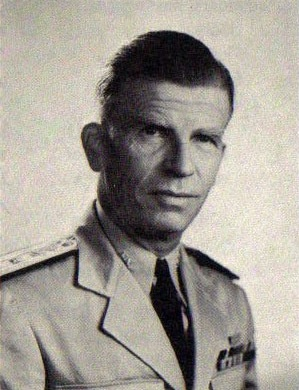
- Born: June 26, 1890; Washington, D.C., U.S.
- Died: November 30, 1958 (aged 68); Glen Cove, New York, U.S.
- Burial place: Arlington National Cemetery
- Relatives: Oscar C. Badger (grandfather); Charles J. Badger (father)
- Military career
- Allegiance: United States of America
- Branch: United States Navy
- Service years: 1911–1952
- Rank: Admiral
- Commands: USS Worden; USS North Carolina; Destroyers, Atlantic Fleet; Service Squadrons, South Pacific; Battleship Division 7; 11th Naval District; Eastern Sea Frontier; Naval Forces Western Pacific
- Conflicts: Mexican campaign, Vera Cruz; World War I; World War II
- Awards: Medal of Honor; Navy Cross; Legion of Merit (4)

Oscar Charles Badger II (June 26, 1890 – November 30, 1958) was an admiral of the United States Navy who served in both World Wars, and, as a junior officer, received the Medal of Honor.

== Early life and family ==
The grandson of Commodore Oscar C. Badger (1823–1899), son of Rear Admiral Charles J. Badger (1853–1932) and a cousin of Secretary of the Navy George E. Badger (1795–1866), Oscar Badger II was born June 26, 1890, in Washington, D.C. He received an at-large appointment to the United States Naval Academy from President Theodore Roosevelt. Badger graduated from the Naval Academy in 1911.

== Naval career ==
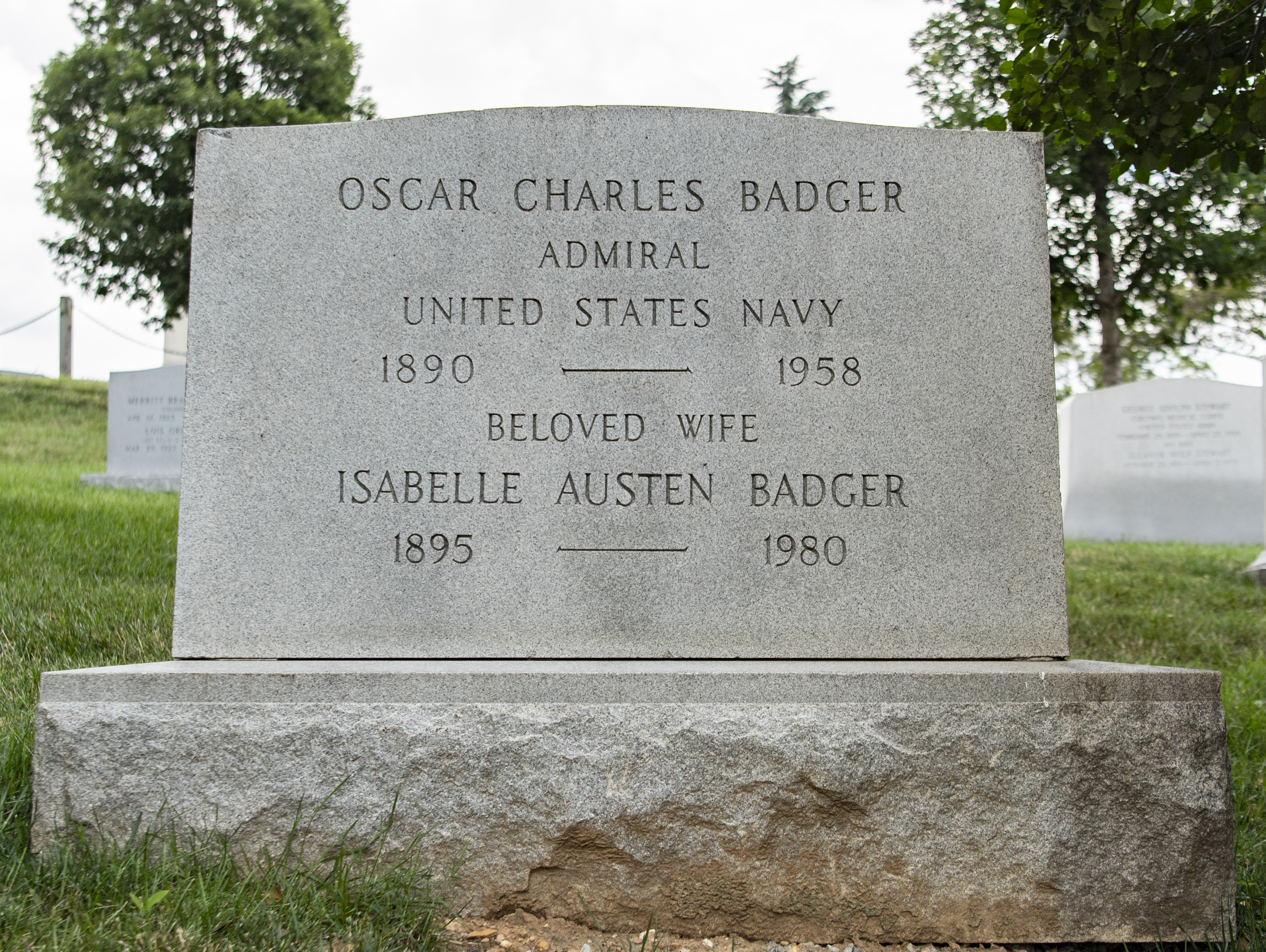
Grave at Arlington National Cemetery

=== Veracruz Occupation ===
As an ensign in USS Utah (BB-31), in 1914 he participated in the U.S. occupation of Veracruz. Several thousand American troops landed, in an effort to force out General Victoriano Huerta, who had seized power in Mexico. Fifty-five men were awarded the Medal of Honor for this action, including seven leaders of the battleship's 'bluejacket battalion'. Badger was cited, "For distinguished conduct in battle, engagements of Vera Cruz, 21 and April 22, 1914. Ens. Badger was in both days' fighting at the head of his company, and was eminent and conspicuous in his conduct, leading his men with skill and courage."

=== World War I and interwar service ===
Badger served with the destroyer force in European waters during World War I. He commanded the destroyer USS Worden (DD-16) from August to October 1918. Badger received the Navy Cross for distinguished service as her commanding officer.

Following the war, Badger served as gunnery officer on various ships. He was then assigned to duty with the Bureau of Ordnance. In 1939, Badger attended the senior course at the Naval War College.

=== World War II ===
In 1941, Captain Badger took command of USS North Carolina (BB-55) and in 1942, after promotion to rear admiral, was Commander Destroyers Atlantic Fleet and subsequently Assistant Chief of Naval Operations for Logistics Plans.

In February 1944, he became Commander Service Squadrons South Pacific and in October Commander of Battleship Division 7. Badger was the first Navy officer to step ashore in Japan at the end of World War II.

Admiral Badger received four awards of the Legion of Merit (two with the Combat "V" device) for service during World War II.

== Postwar service ==
On January 19, 1948, Badger was promoted to vice admiral and, the following month, became Commander, Naval Forces, Far East. In that post, he observed the gradual loss of China to Communist forces and supervised the retirement of American forces to port cities on the Chinese coastline. Following his service as commander of Western Pacific naval forces, Badger was appointed as Commander, Naval Forces, Western Pacific, later commanding the Eleventh Naval District, and the Eastern Sea Frontier.

On June 19, 1951, during congressional hearings on the loss of China, Vice-Admiral Badger testified that the U.S. arms embargo against Nationalist China led to a loss of capability and morale that resulted in their defeat by Communist Chinese forces led by Mao Tse-tung.

He retired from the U.S. Navy in June 1952 with the rank of full admiral. Badger was a consultant with Sperry Corporation and the commander of Civil Defense from 1952 to 1953.

After retirement, Admiral Badger lived in Glen Cove, Long Island, New York. After suffering a heart attack while working in his yard, he died there on November 30, 1958, and was buried at Arlington National Cemetery, in Arlington, Virginia.

== Legacy ==
Officially, USS Badger (FF-1071) was named in honor of all the members of the Badger family who served in the U.S. Navy, but when she was launched in 1968, her sponsor, Isabelle Austen Badger, Adm. Badger's widow, said "I christen thee Oscar Charles Badger II!".

== Awards ==

1st Row	Medal of Honor	Navy Cross	Legion of Merit with three Gold Stars
2nd Row	Mexican Service Medal	World War I Victory Medal with "DESTROYER" clasp	American Defense Service Medal with "FLEET" clasp
3rd Row	American Campaign Medal	Asiatic-Pacific Campaign Medal with five battle stars	World War II Victory Medal
4th Row	Navy Occupation Medal with "ASIA" clasp	National Defense Service Medal	Philippine Liberation Medal

== See also ==
- List of Medal of Honor recipients (Veracruz)
