= USS George E. Badger =

Clemson-class destroyer

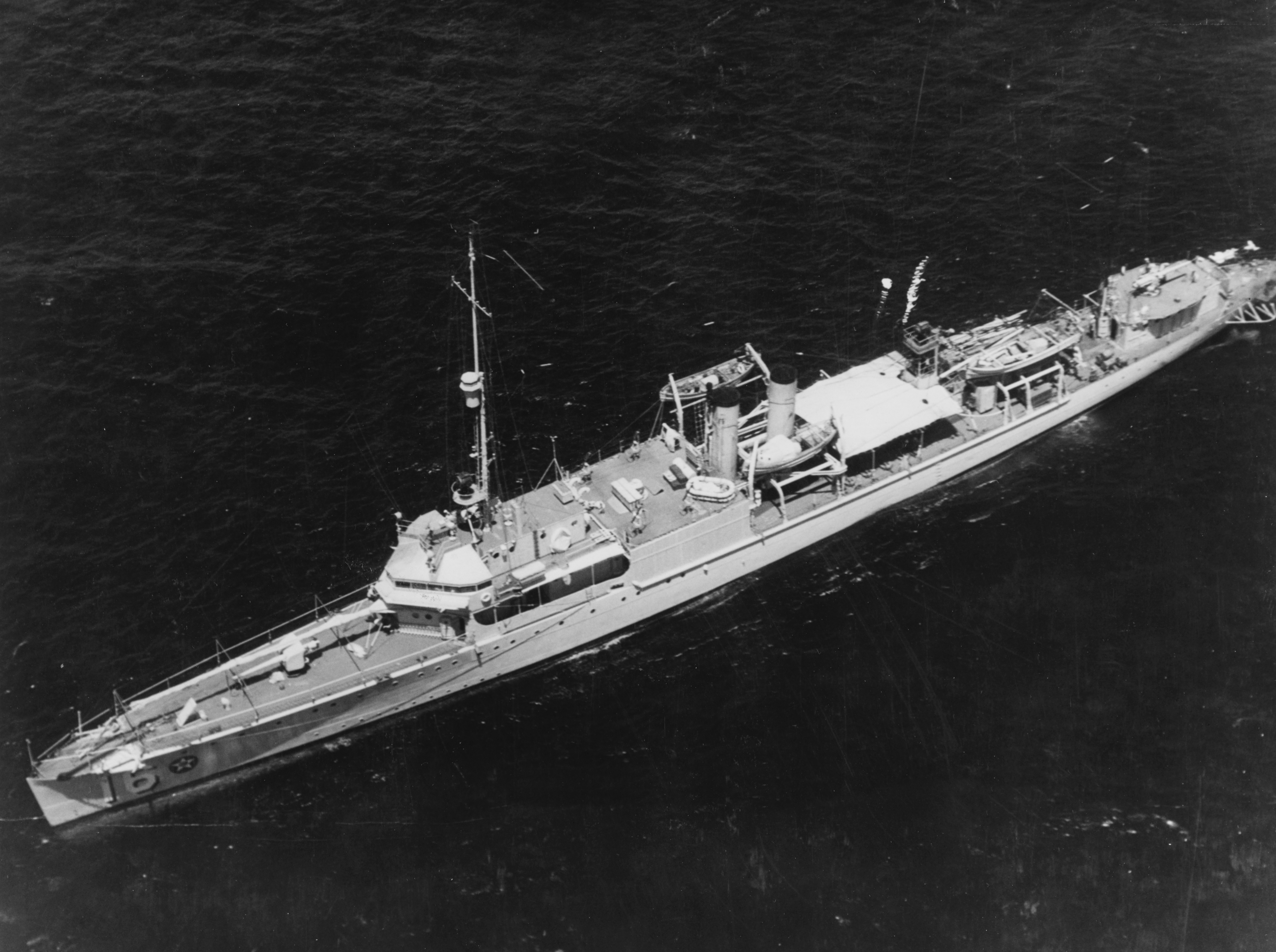
- George E. Badger as a seaplane tender in 1940

History

United States
- Namesake: George E. Badger
- Builder: Newport News Shipbuilding & Dry Dock Company
- Cost: $1,438,690 (hull and machinery)
- Laid down: 24 September 1918
- Launched: 6 March 1920
- Commissioned: 28 July 1920
- Decommissioned: 11 August 1922
- Fate: Transferred to U.S. Coast Guard 1 October 1934
- Acquired: 21 May 1934 (from U.S. Coast Guard)
- Reclassified: Small seaplane tender, AVP-16, 1 October 1939
- Recommissioned: 8 January 1940
- Reclassified: Seaplane tender destroyer, AVD-3, 2 August 1940; High-speed transport, APD-33, 19 May 1944; Destroyer, DD-196, 20 July 1945
- Decommissioned: 3 October 1945
- Stricken: 24 October 1945
- Honors and awards: 8 battle stars & Presidential Unit Citation (World War II)
- Fate: Scrapped 3 June 1946

United States Coast Guard
- Name: USCGD George E. Badger
- Namesake: Previous name retained
- Acquired: 1 October 1930 (from U.S. Navy)
- Fate: Transferred to U.S. Navy 21 May 1934

General characteristics
- Class & type: Clemson-class destroyer
- Displacement: 1,190 long tons (1,209 t)
- Length: 314 ft 5 in (95.83 m)
- Beam: 31 ft 9 in (9.68 m)
- Draft: 9 ft 4 in (2.84 m)
- Propulsion: 26,500 shp (19.8 MW); Geared turbines; 2 screws
- Speed: 35 knots (65 km/h; 40 mph)
- Range: 4,900 nmi (9,100 km) at 15 kn (28 km/h; 17 mph)
- Complement: 101 officers and enlisted
- Armament: 4 × 4"/50 caliber guns; 1 × 3"/23 caliber gun; 12 × 21 inch (533 mm) torpedo tubes

USS George E. Badger (DD-196/CG-16/AVP-16/AVD-3/APD-33) was a Clemson-class destroyer in the United States Navy during World War II; she was named for Secretary of the Navy George E. Badger (1795–1866).

== Construction and commissioning ==
George E. Badger was laid down on 24 September 1918 by the Newport News Shipbuilding & Dry Dock Company; launched on 6 March 1920; sponsored by Miss Mary B. Wilson, the namesake's granddaughter; and commissioned on 28 July 1920.

== Service history ==
After shakedown, she was based at Charleston, South Carolina, while operating in Caribbean waters and along the eastern seaboard from Jacksonville, Florida, to Boston. Returning to Philadelphia on 6 June 1922, she was decommissioned there on 11 August 1922.

She was subsequently transferred to the Treasury Department on 1 October 1930 for use by the Coast Guard. She was reacquired by the Navy on 21 May 1934 and redesignated AVP-16 on 1 October 1939.

=== World War II ===
Badger recommissioned at Philadelphia on 8 January 1940, Lieutenant Commander Frank Akers in command. During the next year she engaged in training operations in the Caribbean. Redesignated AVD-3 on 2 August 1940, she returned to Norfolk, Virginia on 12 January 1941 and subsequently tended planes while based at NS Argentia, Newfoundland, and Reykjavík, Iceland, until the spring of 1942.

Ordered to Charleston, on 26 May 1942, she escorted convoys along the eastern seaboard, in the Gulf of Mexico, and to Recife and Rio de Janeiro, Brazil, until returning to Norfolk on 15 January 1943 to be fitted out for Atlantic convoy duty. Through the spring of 1943 she operated out of Argentia escorting convoys bound for the United Kingdom. In June, she underwent overhaul at Norfolk, then sailed on 13 July for North Africa. Steaming with Bogue and Clemson, she sank U-613 on 23 July 1943 after four depth charge attacks broke up the deep-running submarine southwest of Sao Miguel, Azores; all 48 crew on board died. This victory came just a few hours before planes from Bogue attacked and sank U-521 not far away.

After a landfall at Casablanca, Badger returned to New York on 23 August. During the next two months she made another escort voyage from New York to Casablanca, then returned to New York on 21 October. Departing Hampton Roads on 14 November, she sailed for North Africa with Bogue, Osmond Ingram, Du Pont, and Clemson on an offensive anti-submarine patrol. On 12 December 1943, in the mid-Atlantic west of the Canary Islands this patrol engaged U-172. A protracted fight ensued, with Grumman TBF Avenger and Grumman F4F Wildcat aircraft from Bogue dropping depth charges and Fido homing torpedoes, and the destroyers expending roughly 200 depth charges in total. After 27 hours, the submarine was sunk with the loss of 13 crew (46 survived the action).

After escorting another convoy from Norfolk to North Africa and back, Badger underwent conversion to high speed transport at Charleston and was redesignated APD-33 on 19 May 1944. Sailing for duty in the Pacific, she steamed via the West Coast and Pearl Harbor to Guadalcanal where she arrived on 12 August. From there she carried to the Palau Islands. Reaching Angaur Island on 12 September, she screened warships bombarding the island and from 14 to 16 September sent her frogmen ashore for reconnaissance and demolition work. Intelligence was gathered and obstacles on the beach removed before the ship got underway on 12 October for Leyte, where until 18 October she supported the reconnaissance and bombardment of the east coast of that strategic island and again landed her frogmen.

Departing on 21 October, she called at Kossol Passage, Manus, and Nouméa before participating in the Lingayen landings of 5–11 January 1945. In these she lent her effective fire support as requested, and on the first day of the landings, 5 January, shot down an attacking Japanese torpedo plane. Her frogmen landed on the beaches two days later, and, despite frequent air attacks, Badger continued screening during landings from 7 January until sailing on 11 January for Leyte and Ulithi.

Until the spring of 1945, the veteran warship was overhauled at Ulithi; conducted patrols off Iwo Jima during heavy fighting on the island; and escorted ships from Guam to Guadalcanal, Nouméa, and Manus. She sailed from Ulithi on 2 April 1945 for Okinawa with carriers delivering replacement aircraft, and subsequently escorted convoys from Saipan to Okinawa. Badger sailed from Eniwetok on 24 June for Pearl Harbor.

Ordered thence to San Francisco for reconversion, she reverted to DD-196 on 20 July 1945 and was later decommissioned at that port on 3 October 1945. George E. Badger was scrapped on 3 June 1946.

As of 2005, no other U.S. Navy ship has been named George E. Badger.

== Awards ==
- Presidential Unit Citation
- American Defense Service Medal
- American Campaign Medal with one battle star for World War II service
- European–African–Middle Eastern Campaign Medal with four battle stars for World War II service
- Asiatic–Pacific Campaign Medal with five battle stars for World War II service
- World War II Victory Medal
