= USS Badger (DD-126) =

Wickes-class destroyer

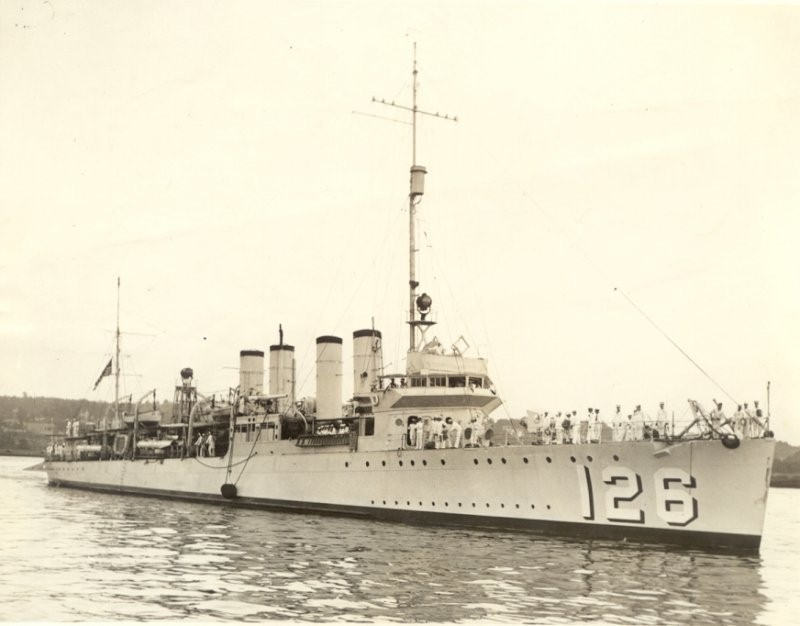
- USS Badger (DD-126)

History

United States
- Name: Badger
- Namesake: Commodore Oscar C. Badger (1823–1899)
- Builder: New York Shipbuilding Corporation, Camden, New Jersey
- Cost: $1,438,598.93 (hull and machinery)
- Laid down: 9 January 1918
- Launched: 24 August 1918
- Commissioned: 29 May 1919
- Decommissioned: 27 May 1922
- Recommissioned: 6 January 1930
- Decommissioned: 20 July 1945
- Stricken: 13 August 1945
- Honors and awards: One battle star for World War II
- Fate: Sold for scrapping 30 November 1945

General characteristics
- Class & type: Wickes-class destroyer
- Displacement: 1,211 tons
- Length: 314 ft 5 in (95.83 m)
- Beam: 31 ft 8 in (9.65 m)
- Draft: 9 ft 4 in (2.84 m)
- Speed: 35 knots (65 km/h)
- Complement: 136 officers and enlisted
- Armament: As built: 4 × 4 in (100 mm), 2 × 3 in (76.2 mm), 4 × triple 21 inch (533 mm) torpedo tube mounts; 1941: 6 × 3-inch/50-caliber guns, 2 × triple 21 inch (533 mm) torpedo tube mounts, 24 depth charges

USS Badger (DD–126) was a United States Navy Wickes-class destroyer in commission from 1919 to 1922 and from 1930 to 1945. She saw service during World War II. She was named for Commodore Oscar C. Badger.

== Construction and commissioning ==
Badger was launched on 24 August 1918 by the New York Shipbuilding Corporation at Camden, New Jersey, sponsored by Mrs. Henry F. Bryan, granddaughter of Commodore Badger. She was commissioned on 29 May 1919.

== Service history ==
=== Pre-World War II ===
Following her commissioning, Badger reported to the United States Atlantic Fleet. She steamed to the Mediterranean, where she cruised until August 1919. Upon her return to the United States East Coast, she was assigned to the United States Pacific Fleet, arriving at San Diego, California, in September 1919. She served at various naval bases on the United States West Coast until May 1922, when she was decommissioned.

Upon recommissioning in January 1930, Badger served with the Battle Force and Scouting Force in the Pacific. In April 1933, she returned to the Atlantic and thereafter participated in coastal cruises and reserve training. From 1938 to 1939, she operated with Special Squadron 4 based at Villefranche-sur-Mer, France. Upon her return to Norfolk, Virginia, she joined Destroyer Division 53, Patrol Force, with additional summer assignments to the Midshipmen Coastal Cruise Detachment.

From March to April 1941, Badger was refitted to better equip her for escort duties. Her gun armament and two triple mounts of torpedo tubes were removed, replaced by six 3"/50 caliber dual-purpose guns. Two triple torpedo tube mounts were retained, and an improved anti-submarine armament of 24 depth charges was fitted.

=== World War II ===
The United States entered World War II on 7 December 1941. Between December 1941 and October 1944, Badger operated as a convoy escort in the Atlantic and Caribbean. Twice she escorted convoys to North Africa (15 October – 28 November 1943 and 15 February – 24 March 1944), and for a brief period (27 June – 1 September 1943) she served as a unit of anti-submarine hunter-killer groups, Task Groups 21.12 and 21.16.

In October 1944, Badger transited the Panama Canal and conducted anti submarine training in the Gulf of Panama off Balboa, Panama Canal Zone. Between 15 November 1944 and 20 June 1945, Badger served with the Anti-Submarine Development Detachment, Port Everglades, Florida, conducting anti-submarine warfare development exercises.

== Decommissioning and disposal ==
Badger arrived at Philadelphia, Pennsylvania, on 22 June 1945 and was decommissioned on 20 July 1945. She was sold on 30 November 1945 for scrapping.

== Awards ==
- American Defense Service Medal
- European–African–Middle Eastern Campaign Medal with one battle star for World War II service
- World War II Victory Medal

Badger received her battle star while operating with Task Group 21.12 in 1943.

== Convoys escorted ==
Convoy	Escort Group	Dates	Notes
ON 26		20-29 Oct 1941	33 ships escorted without loss from Iceland to Newfoundland prior to US declaration of war
HX 159		10-19 Nov 1941	32 ships escorted without loss from Newfoundland to Iceland prior to US declaration of war
ON 39		29 Nov-4 Dec 1941	35 ships escorted without loss from Iceland to Newfoundland prior to US declaration of war
HX 166		21-31 Dec 1941	33 ships escorted without loss from Newfoundland to Iceland
ON 53		9-19 Jan 1942	26 ships escorted without loss from Iceland to Newfoundland
HX 174		9-17 Feb 1942	27 ships escorted without loss from Newfoundland to Iceland
SC 71		5 March 1942	Iceland shuttle
SC 77		11–14 April 1942	Iceland shuttle
SC 79		21 April 1942	Iceland shuttle
ON 91		1–5 May 1942	Iceland shuttle
SC 81		5 May 1942	Iceland shuttle
SC 83		17 May 1942	Iceland shuttle
SC 85		7 June 1942	Iceland shuttle
HX 194		22 June 1942	Iceland shuttle
SC 89		29 June 1942	Iceland shuttle
ON 112		14–17 July 1942	Iceland shuttle
SC 91		19 July 1942	Iceland shuttle
HX 212	MOEF group A3	23 Oct-1 Nov 1942	from Newfoundland to Northern Ireland; 5 ships torpedoed & sunk
ON 145	MOEF group A3	10-18 Nov 1942	from Northern Ireland to Iceland; 3 ships torpedoed (1 sank)
ON 144		19-22 Nov 1942	Iceland shuttle
SC 111	MOEF group A3	2-16 Dec 1942	20 ships escorted without loss from Newfoundland to Northern Ireland
ON 156	MOEF group A3	24 Dec 1942-8 Jan 1943	19 ships escorted without loss from Northern Ireland to Newfoundland
UGS 11		14–19 July 1943	59 ships escorted without loss from Chesapeake Bay to Mediterranean Sea
UGS 15	Support Group with USS Core	27 August-2 September 1943	50 ships escorted without loss from Chesapeake Bay to Mediterranean Sea
UGS 21	Support Group with USS Block Island	15–18 October 1943	67 ships escorted without loss from Chesapeake Bay to Mediterranean Sea
GUS 20	Support Group with USS Block Island	13–14 November 1943	78 ships escorted without loss from Mediterranean Sea to Chesapeake Bay
UGS 23	Support Group with USS Block Island	14–19 November 1943	51 ships escorted without loss from Chesapeake Bay to Mediterranean Sea
GUS 32		7–23 March 1944	91 ships escorted without loss from Mediterranean Sea to Chesapeake Bay
