= List of United States Navy ships: T–V =

Ships of the United States Navy

Ships in current service
- Current ships

Ships grouped alphabetically
- A–B; C; D–F; G–H; I–K; L; M; N–O; P; Q–R; S; T–V; W–Z

Ships grouped by type
- Aircraft carriers; Airships; Amphibious warfare ships; Auxiliaries; Battlecruisers; Battleships; Cruisers; Destroyers; Destroyer escorts; Destroyer leaders; Escort carriers; Frigates; Hospital ships; Littoral combat ships; Mine warfare vessels; Monitors; Oilers; Patrol vessels; Registered civilian vessels; Sailing frigates; Steam frigates; Steam gunboats; Ships of the line; Sloops of war; Submarines; Torpedo boats; Torpedo retrievers; Unclassified miscellaneous; Yard and district craft

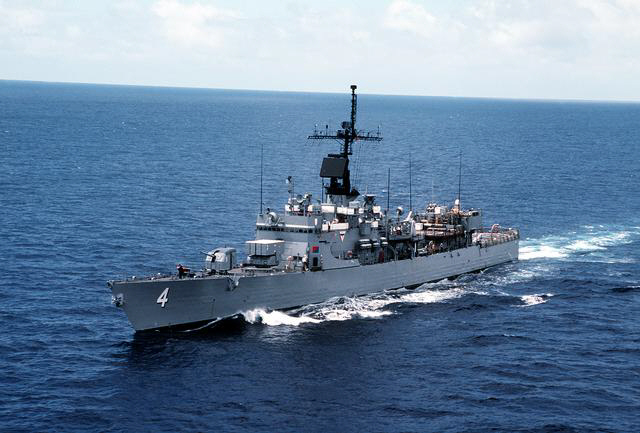
USS Talbot (FFG-4)

This section of the list of United States Navy ships contains all ships of the United States Navy with names beginning with T, U and V.

For a list exclusively of currently commissioned ships, see the List of current ships of the United States Navy.

For ships with unique names, "USS Ship‍name" redirects to the ship article. For reused names, "USS Ship‍name" is an index page for the ships of that name; the links after the name lead to the specific ship pages.

== T ==
=== T–Ta ===
- USS T-1 (SF-1/SS-52, SST-1)
- USS T-2 (SF-2/SS-60, SST-2)
- USS T-3 (SF-3/SS-61)
- USS T. A. Ward (1861)
- USS T. D. Horner (1859)
- USS Ta-Kiang (1862)
- USS Tabberer (DE-418)
- USS Tabora (AKA-45)
- USS Tackle (ARS-37/ARST-4/IX-217)
- USS Tacloban (PG-22)
- USS Tacoma (1893, C-18/PG-32/CL-20, PG-111/PF-3, PGM-92/PG-92)
- USS Taconic (AGC-17/LCC-17)
- USS Taconnet (YTB-417/YTM-417)
- USS Tacony (1863, SP-5)
- USS Tact (PG-98)
- USS Tadousac (AT-22)
- USS Taganak (AG-45)
- USS Taghkanic (1864)
- USS Tahchee (YN-43/YNT-11/YTM-736)
- USS Tahgayuta (1863)
- USS Tahoe (CM-2)
- USS Tahoma (1861, WPG-80)
- USS Takana (ID-3039)
- USS Takanis Bay (CVE-89/CVU-89/AKV-31)
- USS Takelma (AT-113/ATF-113)
- USS Takos (YTB-546/YTM-546)
- USS Talamanca (AF-15)
- USS Talbot (TB-15, DD-114/APD-7, DEG-4/FFG-4)
- USS Talbot County (LST-1153)
- USS Talita (AKS-8)
- USS Talladega (APA-208/LPA-208)
- USS Tallahassee (BM-9/IX-16, CL-61, CL-116)
- USS Tallahatchie (1863)
- USS Tallahatchie County (LST-1154/AVB-2)
- USS Tallahoma (1862)
- USS Tallapoosa (1863, 1915)
- USS Tallulah (AO-50/T-AO-50/T-AOT-50)
- USS Talofa (SP-1016)
- USS Taluga (AO-62/T-AO-62)
- USS Tamaha (YN-44/YNT-12)
- USS Tamalpais (AO-96/T-AO-96)
- USS Tamaqua (YTB-797)
- USS Tamaque (YN-52/YNT-20/YTM-741)
- USS Tamarack (SP-561)
- USS Tamaroa (1921/AT-62/YT-136/YTB-136, WAT-166/WATF-166/WMEC-166)
- USS Tambor (SS-198)
- USS Tampa (1912, WPG-48)
- USS Tampico (1840s)
- USS Tanager (AM-5, AM-385/MSF-385/WTR-885)
- USS Tanamo (ID-2176)
- USS Tananek Bay (CVE-88)
- USS Taney (1834, WPG-37)
- USS Tang (SS-306, SS-563, SSN-805)
- USS Tangier (SP-469, AV-8)
- USS Tanguingui (SP-126)
- USS Taniwha (SP-129)
- USS Tanner (AGS-15, T-AGS-40)
- USS Tantalus (ARL-27)
- USS Tapacola (AMc-54/IX-230)
- USS Taposa (YFB-1163)
- USS Tappahannock (AO-43)
- USS Tarantula (SS-12, SP-124)
- USS Tarawa (CV-40/CVA-40/CVS-40/AVT-12, LHA-1)
- USS Tarazed (AF-13)
- USS Tarbell (DD-142)
- USS Targeteer (YV-3)
- USS Tarpon (SS-14, SS-175)
- USS Tarrant (AK-214)
- USS Tarrytown (PC-1252)
- USS Tartar (1869)
- USS Tasco (SP-502)
- USS Tasker H. Bliss (AP-42)
- USS Tatarrax (YT-372/YTB-372/YTM-372)
- USS Tate (AKA-70)
- USS Tatnuck (AT-27/ATO-27, ATA-195)
- USS Tatoosh (YAG-1)
- USS Tattnall (DD-125/APD-19, DDG-19)
- USS Tatum (DE-789/APD-81)
- USS Taupata (YAG-26)
- USS Taurus (AF-25, T-AK-273/T-LSV-8, PHM-3)
- USS Taussig (DD-746, DE-1030)
- USS Tautog (SS-199, SSN-639)
- USS Tavibo (YTB-246)
- USS Tawah (1863)
- USS Tawakoni (AT-114/ATF-114)
- USS Tawasa (AT-92/ATF-92)
- USS Taylor (DD-94, DD-468/DDE-468, FFG-50)
- USS Tazewell (APA-209)
- USS Tazha (YT-147/YTB-147/YTM-147)

=== Tc–Te ===
- USS Tchifonta (1814)
- USS Teaberry (YN-29/AN-34)
- USS Teak (YN-30/AN-35)
- USS Teal (AM-23/AVP-5)
- USS Teaser (1861, SP-933)
- USS Tech III (SP-1055)
- USS Tech Jr. (SP-1761)
- USS Tecumseh (1863, YT-24/YTM-24, YT-273, SSBN-628)
- USS Ted Stevens (DDG-128)
- USS Tekesta (AT-93/ATF-93)
- USS Telamon (ARB-8)
- USS Telesforo Trinidad (DDG-139)
- USS Telfair (APA-210/LPA-210)
- USS Tellico (AOG-74)
- USS Tempest (1862, 1869, PC-2/WPC-2)
- USS Temptress (PG-62)
- USNS Tenacious (T-AGOS-17)
- USS Tenacity (PG-71)
- USS Tenadores (1913)
- USS Tench (SS-417/AGSS-417)
- USS Tenedos (1861)
- USS Tenino (AT-115/ATF-115)
- USS Tennessee (1862, 1863, 1865, ACR-10, BB-43, SSBN-734)
- USS Tensas (1860)
- USS Tensaw (YTB-418/YTM-418)
- USS Tercel (AM-386/MSF-386)
- USS Terebinth (YN-78/AN-59)
- USS Teresa (ID-4478)
- USS Tern (SP-871, AM-31/AT-142/ATO-142)
- USS Ternate (ID-2697)
- USS Terrebonne Parish (LST-1156)
- USS Terrell County (LST-1157)
- USS Terrier (1822, SP-960)
- USS Terror (1863, BM-4, CM-5/MM-5/MMF-5)
- USS Terry (DD-25, DD-513)
- USS Tesota (YN-95/AN-71/ATA-217)
- USS Teton (AGC-14)
- USS Tetonkaha (AOG-41)
- USS Texan (ID-1354)
- USS Texas (1892, BB-35, DLGN-39/CGN-39, SSN-775)

=== Th ===
- USS Thach (FFG-43)
- USS Thad Cochran (DDG-135)
- USS Thaddeus Parker (DE-369)
- USS Thalia (PYc-20)
- USS Thames River (LSM(R)-534)
- USS Thatcher (DD-162, DD-514)
- USS The Sullivans (DD-537, DDG-68)
- USS Theenim (AKA-63)
- USS Thelma (1911)
- USS Theodore E. Chandler (DD-717)
- USS Theodore Roosevelt (1906, SSBN-600/SSN-600, CVN-71)
- USS Theta (1864)
- USS Thetis (1881, SP-391, WPC-115)
- USS Thetis Bay (CVE-90/CVHA-1/LPH-6)
- USS Thistle (1862, SP-1058)
- USS Thomas (DD-182, DE-102)
- USS Thomas A. Edison (SSBN-610/SSN-610)
- USS Thomas Blackhorne (1917)
- USS Thomas Buckley (1918)
- USS Thomas C. Hart (DE-1092/FF-1092)
- USRC Thomas Corwin (1876)
- USNS Thomas D. Parham (T-AO-216)
- USS Thomas E. Fraser (DD-736/DM-24/MMD-24)
- USS Thomas F. Nickel (DE-587)
- USS Thomas Freeborn (1861)
- USS Thomas G. Kelley (DDG-140)
- USNS Thomas G. Thompson (T-AGOR-9/IX-517, T-AGOR-23)
- USS Thomas Graham (1918)
- USS Thomas H. Barry (AP-45)
- USS Thomas Henrix (1918)
- USS Thomas Hudner (DDG-116)
- USS Thomas J. Gary (DE-61, DE-326/DER-326)
- USS Thomas Jefferson (AP-60/APA-30, SSBN-618/SSN-618)
- USS Thomas Laundry (1918)
- USS Thomas S. Gates (CG-51)
- USS Thomas Stone (AP-59/APA-29)
- USNS Thomas Washington (T-AGOR-10)
- USS Thomason (DE-203)
- USS Thomaston (LSD-28)
- USS Thompson (DD-305, DD-627/DMS-38)
- USS Thor (ARC-4/T-ARC-4)
- USS Thorn (DD-505, DD-647, DD-988)
- USS Thornback (SS-418)
- USS Thornborough (DE-565)
- USS Thornhill (DE-195)
- USS Thornton (TB-33, DD-270/AVD-11)
- USS Thrasher (SS-26, SP-546, AMS-203/MSC-203)
- USS Threadfin (SS-410)
- USS Threat (AM-124/MSF-124)
- USS Thresher (SS-200, SSN-593)
- USS Thrush (AM-18/AVP-3, AMS-204/MSC-204)
- USS Thuban (AK-68/AKA-19/LKA-19)
- USS Thunder (1862)
- USS Thunderbolt (PC-12/WPC-12)
- USS Thunderer (1869)
- USNS Thurgood Marshall (T-AO-211)
- USS Thurston (AP-77)

=== Ti–Tl ===
- USS Tiburon (SS-529)
- USS Tickler
- USS Ticonderoga (1814, 1863, 1918, ID-1968, CV-14, DDG-47/CG-47)
- USS Tide (SP-953, AM-125)
- USS Tidewater (AD-31)
- USS Tiger (ID-1640, WPC-152)
- USS Tigress (1813, 1861, 1871, 1905)
- USS Tigrone (SS-419/SSR-419/AGSS-419)
- USS Tilefish (SS-307)
- USS Tillamook (AT-16/YT-122/YTM-122, SP-269, ATA-192)
- USS Tillman (DD-135, DD-641)
- USS Tills (DE-748)
- USS Timbalier (AVP-54)
- USNS Timber Hitch (ORV-17/T-AGM-17)
- USS Timmerman (DD-828/EDD-828/AG-152)
- USS Timor (1861)
- USS Tingey (TB-34, DD-272, DD-539)
- USS Tingles (AG-144/AKL-13)
- USS Tinian (CVE-123/CVHE-123/AKV-23)
- USS Tinosa (SS-283, SSN-606)
- USS Tinsman (DE-589)
- USS Tioga (1862, 1916)
- USS Tioga County (LST-1158/T-LST-1158)
- USS Tippecanoe (1864, AO-21, T-AO-199)
- USS Tipton (AK-215, PC-1231/PCC-1231)
- USS Tirante (SS-420)
- USS Tiru (SS-416)
- USS Tisdale (DE-33, DE-278)
- USNS Titan (T-AGOS-15)
- USS Titania (AK-55/AKA-13)
- USS Tivives (1911)
- USS Tjikembang (1914)
- USS Tjisondari (1915)
- USS Tlingit (YTB-497/YTM-497)

=== To ===
- USS Toad (1914)
- USS Tocobaga (YTB-709)
- USS Tocsam (1910)
- USS Todd (AKA-71)
- USS Toiler (ARS-47)
- USS Toka (YT-149/YTB-149/YTM-149)
- USS Token (AM-126/MSF-126)
- USS Toledo (CA-133, PG-141, SSN-769)
- USS Tolland (AKA-64)
- USS Tollberg (DE-593/APD-103)
- USS Tolman (DD-740/DM-28/MMD-28)
- USS Tolovana (AO-64/T-AO-64)
- USS Tolowa (AT-116/ATF-116)
- USS Tom Bowline (1814)
- USS Tom Green County (LST-1159)
- USS Tomahawk (AO-88/T-AO-88, YTB-789)
- USS Tomatate (SS-421)
- USS Tombigbee (AOG-11)
- USS Tomich (DE-242)
- USS Tommy Traddles (1906)
- USS Tonawanda (1864, YN-115/AN-89)
- USS Tonkawa (ATA-176/T-ATA-176, YTB-710, YTB-786)
- USS Tonopah (BM-8)
- USS Tonowek Bay (CVE-104)
- USNS Tonti (T-AOG-76)
- USS Tontogany (YTB-821)
- USS Tooele (PC-572)
- USS Topa Topa (AF-29)
- USS Topawa (YTB-419/YTM-419)
- USS Topaz (PYc-10)
- USS Topeka (PG-35/IX-35, CL-67/CLG-8, SSN-754)
- USS Topenebee (YT-373/YTB-373/YTM-373)
- USS Topila (ID-3001)
- USS Torch (1814)
- USS Torchwood (YN-74/AN-55)
- USS Tornado (PC-14/WPC-14)
- USS Toro (SS-422/AGSS-422)
- USS Torpedo (1814)
- USS Torrance (AKA-76)
- USS Torrington (BDE-568)
- USS Torry (AG-140/AKL-11)
- USS Torsk (SS-423/AGSS-423/IXSS-423)
- USS Tortola (PF-91)
- USS Tortuga (LSD-26, LSD-46)
- USS Totem Bay (CVE-111)
- USS Toucan (AM-387/MSF-387)
- USS Toucey (DD-282)
- USS Tourist (PYc-32)
- USS Tourmaline (PY-20)
- USS Towaliga (AOG-42)
- USS Towanda (PC-592)
- USS Towers (DD-959/DDG-9)
- USS Towhee (AM-388/MSF-388/AGS-28)
- USS Towner (AKA-77)
- USS Townsend (AV-18)
- USS Toxaway (SP-743)

=== Tr ===
- USS Trabajador (1931)
- USS Tracer (AGR-15)
- USS Tracy (DD-214/DM-19)
- USS Traffic (1891)
- USS Tramp (SP-646)
- USS Tranquillity (AH-14/APH-114)
- SS Transcolorado (T-AK-2005)
- USS Transfer (IX-46)
- MV Transpacific
- USS Trapper (ACM-9)
- USS Trathen (DD-530)
- USS Traveler (SP-122)
- USS Traveller (1805)
- USS Traverse (AK-216)
- USS Traverse County (LST-1160/T-LST-1160)
- USCGC Travis (WPC-153/WSC-153)
- USS Travis Manion (LPD-33)
- USS Traw (DE-350)
- USS Treasure (YFB-24)
- USS Trefoil (1865, IX-149)
- USS Trego (AKA-78)
- USS Trembler (SS-424)
- USS Trenton (1876, CL-11, LPD-14, T-JHSV-5/T-EPF-5)
- USS Trepang (SS-412/AGSS-412, SSN-674)
- USS Trever (DD-339/DMS-16/AG-110)
- USS Triana (1865, IX-223)
- USS Triangulum (AK-102)
- USS Trident (AMc-107)
- USS Trieste (1953)
- USS Trieste II (DSV-1)
- USS Trigger (SS-237, SS-564)
- USS Trilby (SP-673)
- USS Trimount (AM-18)
- USS Tringa (ASR-16)
- USS Trinity (AO-13)
- USS Trinity River (LSM(R)-535)
- USS Tripoli (CVE-64/CVU-64/T-CVU-64, LPH-10, LHA-7)
- USS Trippe (1812, DD-33, DD-403, DE-1075/FF-1075)
- USS Tristram Shandy (1864)
- USS Triton (YT-10, ID-3312, SS-201, WPC-116, SSRN-586/SSN-586)
- USS Tritonia (1863)
- USS Triumph (AM-323/MSF-323/MMC-3, T-AGOS-4)
- USS Trocadero Bay (CVE-119)
- USS Troilus (AKA-46)
- USS Trollope (DE-566)
- USS Troup (1812)
- USS Trousdale (AKA-79)
- USS Trout (SS-202, SS-566)
- USS Troy (ID-1614)
- USS Truant (PYc-14)
- USS Truckee (AOG-75, AO-147/T-AO-147)
- USS Truett (DE-1095/FF-1095/FFT-1095)
- USS Trumbull (1776 galley, 1776 frigate, 1799)
- USS Trumpeter (DE-180, DE-279)
- USS Trumpetfish (SS-425)
- USS Trutta (SS-421)
- USS Truxtun (1842, DD-14, DD-229, DE-282/APD-98, DLGN-35/CGN-35, DDG-103)
- USS Tryon (APH-1)

=== Ts-Tu ===
- MV TSgt John A. Chapman (AK-323)
- USS Tucana (AK-88)
- USS Tucker (DD-57, DD-374)
- USS Tucson (CL-98/CLAA-88, SSN-770)
- USS Tucumcari (PGH-2)
- USS Tudno (1891)
- USS Tulagi (CVE-72)
- USS Tulare (AK-217, AKA-112/LKA-112)
- USS Tularosa (AOG-43)
- USS Tulip (1862, 1908)
- USS Tullibee (SS-284, SSN-597)
- USS Tulsa (PG-22, CA-129, LCS-16)
- USS Tuluran (AG-46)
- USS Tumult (AM-127/MSF-127)
- USS Tuna (SS-27, SP-664, SS-203)
- USS Tunica (ATA-178)
- USS Tunis (AK-47)
- USS Tunny (SS-282/SSG-282/APSS-282/LPSS-282, SSN-682)
- USS Tunxis (1864, YN-119/AN-90)
- USS Tupelo (YN-75)
- USS Turaco (AMc-55)
- USS Turandot (AKA-47)
- USS Turbot (SS-31, SS-427)
- USS Turkey (AM-13/AT-143/ATO-143, AMS-56/MSC(O)-56)
- USS Turner (DD-259, DD-506, DD-648, DD-834/DDR-834)
- USS Turner Joy (DD-951)
- USS Turquoise (PY-18)
- USS Turtle (1775, DSV-3)
- USS Tuscaloosa (CA-37, LST-1187)
- USS Tuscana (AKN-3)
- USS Tuscarora (1861, AT-77/YT-341/YTB-341/ATA-245)
- USS Tuscola (YT-280/YTB-280)
- USS Tuscumbia (1862, YTB-762)
- USS Tusk (SS-426)
- USS Tuskegee (YTB-806)
- USS Tutahaco (YTB-524/YTM-524)
- USS Tutuila (PG-44/PR-4, ARG-4)
- USS Tweedy (DE-532)
- USS Twiggs (DD-127, DD-591)
- USS Twilight (AP-94)
- USNS Twin Falls (T-AGM-11/T-AGS-37)
- USS Twining (DD-540)
- USS Two Sisters (1856)
- USS Tybee (1895)
- USS Tyee (1884)
- USS Tyler (1857, DE-567)
- USS Typhon (ARL-28)
- USS Typhoon (PC-5)
- USS Tyrrell (AKA-80)

== U ==
- USS U-111
- USS U-117
- USS U-140
- USS U-2513
- USS U-3008
- USS UB-148
- USS UB-88
- USS UC-97
- USS U. S. Grant (1871, AP-29)
- USS Uhlmann (DD-687)
- USS Ukiah (PCC-1251)
- USS Ulitka Bay (AVG-91/ACV-91/CVE-91)
- USS Ulua (SS-428)
- USS Ulvert M. Moore (DE-442)
- USS Ulysses (1914, ARB-9)
- USS Ulysses S. Grant (SSBN-631)
- USS Umpqua (1865, AT-25/ATO-25, ATA-209)
- USS Unadilla (1861, YT-4/YTM-4, ATA-182)
- USS Unalga (1912, WAK-185)
- USS Uncas (1843, 1893, SP-689, AT-51/YT-110, YT-242/YTB-242)
- USS Undaunted (ID-1950/YT-125/AT-58/ATO-58, ATA-199, AFDL-26)
- USS Underhill (DE-682)
- USS Underwood (FFG-36)
- USS Underwriter (1852, SP-1390/YT-44)
- USS Undine (1863, 1893)
- USS Unicoi (IX-216)
- USS Unicorn (SS-429, SS-436)
- USS Unimak (AVP-31/WAVP-379/WHEC-379/WTR-379)
- USS Union (1841, 1846, 1861, AKA-106/LKA-106)
- USS Uniontown (PF-65)
- USS Unit (1862)
- USS United States (1797, CC-6, CVA-58, CVN-75)
- USS Upham (DE-283/APD-99)
- USS Upshur (DD-144/AG-103, T-AP-198)
- USS Uranus (AF-14)
- USS Urdaneta (1883)
- USS Urgent (ARS-48)
- USS Usage (AM-130)
- USS Utah (BB-31/AG-16, SSN-801)
- USS Ute (AT-76/ATF-76/T-ATF-76/WMEC-76)
- USS Utina (AT-163/ATF-163)
- USS Utowana (SP-951)
- USS Uvalde (AKA-88)

== V ==
- USS V-1 (SF-4/SS-163)
- USS V-2 (SF-5/SS-164)
- USS V-3 (SF-6/SS-165)
- USS V-4 (SF-7)
- USS V-5 (SF-8/SC-1)
- USS V-6 (SF-9/SC-2)
- USS V-7 (SF-10/SC-3)
- USS V-8 (SC-4)
- USS V-9 (SC-5)
- USS V-43 (1915)

=== Va ===
- MV VADM K. R. Wheeler (T-AG-5001)
- USS Vaga (YT-116, YT-374/YTB-374/YTM-374)
- USS Vagrant (PYc-30)
- USS Valcour (AVP-55/AGF-1)
- USS Valdez (DE-1096/FF-1096)
- USS Valeda (SP-592)
- USS Valencia (AKA-81)
- USS Valentine (AF-47)
- USS Valeria (AKA-48)
- USS Valiant (SP-535, PYc-51, YT-802)
- USS Vallejo (CL-112, PG-205/PF-97, CL-146)
- USS Valley City (1859)
- USS Valley Forge (CV-37, CV-45/CVA-45/CVS-45/LPH-8, CG-50)
- USS Valor (AMc-108, AM-472//MSO-472)
- USS Valparaiso (1836)
- USS Valve (ARS-28)
- USS Vamarie (IX-47)
- USS Vammen (DE-644)
- USS Van Buren (1839, PG-150/PF-42)
- USS Van Valkenburgh (DD-656)
- USS Van Voorhis (DE-1028)
- USS Vanadis (AKA-49)
- USS Vance (DE-387/WDE-487/DER-387)
- USS Vancouver (LPD-2)
- USS Vandalia (1828, 1876, IX-191, PC-1175)
- USS Vandegrift (FFG-48)
- USS Vanderbilt (1862)
- USS Vanderburgh (AKS-19/APB-48)
- USS Vandivier (DE-540/DER-540)
- USS Vanguard (T-AG-194/T-AGM-19)
- USS Vara (PC-509)
- USS Varian (DE-798)
- USS Varuna (1861, AGP-5)
- USS Vashon (YFB-19)
- USS Vaterland (1917)
- USS Vaud J. (SP-3361)

=== Ve ===
- USS Vedette (1914, SP-163)
- USS Veendijk (ID-2515)
- USS Vega (SP-734, AK-17, AF-59, T-AK-286)
- USS Vela (AK-89/T-AK-89)
- USS Vella Gulf (CVE-111/CVHE-111/AKV-11, CG-72)
- USS Velocipede (SP-1258)
- USS Velocity (1862, SP-446, AM-128/MSF-128)
- USS Venango (AKA-82)
- USS Vencedor (SP-669)
- USS Vendace (SS-430)
- USS Venetia (SP-431)
- USS Venetian Maid (SP-188)
- USS Vengeance (1779, 1805)
- USS Vent (ARS-29)
- USS Venture (SP-616, PC-826, MSO-496)
- USS Venus (AK-135)
- USS Verbena (1864)
- USS Verdi (SP-979)
- USS Verdin (AMS-38/MSC(O)-38, ASR-17)
- USS Vergana (SP-519)
- USS Veritas (AKA-50)
- USS Vermilion (AKA-107/LKA-107)
- USS Vermillion (ACV-52/CVE-52)
- USS Vermillion Bay (CVE-108)
- USS Vermont (1848, BB-20, SSN-792)
- USS Verna & Esther (SP-1187)
- USS Vernon County (LST-1161)
- USS Vesole (DD-878/DDR-878)
- USS Vesta (ID-2506)
- USS Vestal (AC-1/AR-4)
- USS Vester (SP-686)
- USS Vesuvius (1806, 1846, 1888, AE-15)

=== Vi ===
- USS Viburnum (YN-76/AN-57)
- USS Vicksburg (1863, PG-11, CL-81, CL-86, CG-69)
- USS Victor (SP-1995, AMc-109)
- USNS Victor Vescovo (T-AGOS-26)
- USS Victoria (1855, AO-46, T-AK-281)
- USS Victorine (SP-951)
- USS Victorious (ID-3514, T-AGOS-19)
- USS Victory (1863)
- USS Vidette (1907)
- USS Vidofner (SP-402)
- USS Vigil (YAGR-12/AGR-12)
- USS Vigilance (AM-324/MSF-324)
- USS Vigilant (1812, YT-25, SP-406, WPC-154)
- USS Vigor (AMc-110, AM-473/MSO-473)
- USNS Vigorous (T-AGOS-12)
- USS Viking (1883, SP-3314, ARS-1)
- USS Vileehi (IX-62)
- USS Villalobos (PG-42, IX-145)
- USS Vim (PG-99)
- USS Vincennes (1826, CA-44, CL-64, CG-49)
- USS Vincent (SP-3246)
- USS Vindicator (1863, T-AGOS-3/WMEC-3)
- USS Vinton (AKA-83)
- USS Violet (1862, WAGL-250)
- USS Viper (1806, 1814, SS-10)
- USS Vireo (AM-52/AT-144/ATO-144, AMS-205/MSC-205)
- USS Virginia (1776, 1797, 1825, 1861, BB-13, SP-274, SP-746, SP-1965, DLGN-38/CGN-38, SSN-774)
- USS Virginian (1904, ID-3920, T-AKR-9205)
- USS Virgo (AK-69/AKA-20/AE-30)
- USS Vision (SP-744, SP-1114)
- USS Visitor (SP-2266)
- USS Vital (AM-129, AM-474/MSO-474)
- USS Vitality (PG-100)
- USS Vitesse (SP-1192)
- USS Vittorio Emmanuele III (ID-3095)
- USS Vivace (SP-583)
- USS Vixen (1803, 1813, 1846, 1861, 1869, PY-4, PG-53)

=== Vo–Vu ===
- USS Voge (DE-1047/FF-1047)
- USS Vogelgesang (DD-862, DE-284)
- USS Volador (IX-59, SS-490)
- USS Volans (AKS-9)
- USS Volunteer (1863, ID-3242)
- USS Von Steuben (ID-3017, SSBN-632)
- USS Voyager (SP-361)
- USS Vreeland (DE-1068/FF-1068)
- USS Vulcan (1884, AC-5, AR-5)
