= USS Traveler =

USS Traveler and USS Traveller have been the name of more than one United States Navy ship, and may refer to:

- USS Traveller (1805), a supply boat in commission in 1805
- USS Traveler (SP-122), a patrol boat in commission from 1917 to 1919
