= Volador (disambiguation) =

A volador (Spanish: "flyer") is a participant in the ancient Mesoamerican ceremony Danza de los Voladores.

Volador may also refer to:

- Disco Volador, an album by The Oreilles
- El Volador hill, a hill in Medellín, Colombia
- HMS Volador, a Spanish ship acquired by the Royal Navy
- Ramón Ibarra Banda, a Mexican professional wrestler whose ring name was previously Volador, father of Volador Jr.
- Volador Jr., a Mexican professional wrestler, son of the above
- USS Volador, two ships of the U.S. Navy
