= Taniwha (disambiguation) =

Taniwha are supernatural beings in Māori mythology.

Taniwha may also refer to:

- USS Taniwha, a US Navy patrol boat 1917–1919
- Northland Rugby Union, known as the Taniwha
- Taniwha Cove, a feature to the north of Nicholson Peninsula, Antarctica
