= Tuscumbia =

Tuscumbia is the name of these places and things in the United States of America:

- Tuscumbia, Alabama
- Tuscumbia, Missouri
- Tuscumbia River (in Tennessee and Mississippi)
- USS Tuscumbia, ships in the US Navy
