= USS Terrier =

USS Terrier has been the name of more than one United States Navy ship, and may refer to:

- USS Terrier (1822), a schooner in commission from 1823 to 1825
- USS Terrier (SP-960), a patrol boat in commission from 1917 to 1919
