= USS Tern =

USS Tern is the name of more than one United States Navy ship, and may refer to:

- USS Tern (SP-871), a patrol boat in commission from 1917 to 1918
- USS Tern (AM-31), a minesweeper in commission from 1919 to 1945
