= USS Venture =

Three vessels of the United States Navy have been named USS Venture:

- The first USS Venture (SP-616) was a steam yacht leased by the Navy from 1917 to 1919.
- The second USS Venture (PC-826) was also a yacht, originally built in 1931, acquired at the end of December 1941, used for patrols and convoys along the East Coast, and sold in 1946.
- The third USS Venture (MSO-496) was a minesweeper in service from 1956 to 1971.
