= USS Tatnuck =

USS Tatnuck may refer to:

- USS Tatnuck (AT-27) a Bagaduce-class tugboat laid down in 1918 and struck in 1946
- USS Tatnuck (ATA-195) a Sotoyomo-class tugboat serving from 1944 to 1971
