= USS Tangier =

USS Tangier has been the name of more than one United States Navy ship, and may refer to:

- USS Tangier (SP-469), a patrol vessel in commission from 1917 to 1918
- USS Tangier (AV-8), a seaplane tender in commission from 1941 to 1947
