= USS Viking =

USS Viking has been the name of more than one United States Navy ship, and may refer to:

- USS Viking (1898), a converted yacht in commission from May to September 1898 and from September to October 1899
- USS Viking (SP-3314), a patrol boat in service from 1918 to 1919
- USS Viking (ARS-1), a rescue and salvage ship commissioned in 1942 and stricken in 1953

== See also ==
- Viking (disambiguation)#Ships
