= USS Tuna =

USS Tuna has been the name of more than one United States Navy ship, and may refer to:

- USS Tuna (SS-27), a submarine renamed USS G-2 (SS-27) before she was launched, in commission from 1913 to 1919
- USS Tuna (SP-664), a patrol vessel in commission from 1917 to 1919
- USS Tuna (SS-203), a submarine in commission from 1941 to 1946
