= USS Tigress =

USS Tigress has been the name of more than one United States Navy ship, and may refer to:

- USS Tigress (1813), a schooner commissioned in 1813 and captured by the British in 1814
- USS Tigress (1861), a steamer acquired in 1861 and lost in 1862
- USS Tigress (1871), a steamer in service from May to November 1873
- USS Tigress (1905), a patrol boat in commission from 1917 to 1918 or 1919
