= USS Vedette =

USS Vedette has been the name of more than one United States Navy ship, and may refer to:

- USS Vedette (SP-163), a yacht in commission as a patrol vessel from 1917 to 1919
- USS Vedette (1914), a motorboat acquired in 1917 or 1918 and in service as a patrol boat until December 1918
