= USS Tide =

USS Tide may refer to two ships of the United States Navy:

- USS Tide (SP-953), a tugboat built in 1916 at Manitowoc, Wisconsin, by the Manitowoc Shipbuilding Co
- USS Tide (AM-125), laid down on 16 March 1942 at Savannah, Georgia, by the Savannah Machinery and Foundry Company.
