= USS Vella Gulf =

Two ships of the United States Navy have been named USS Vella Gulf, after the 1943 battle of Vella Gulf in the Solomon Islands. The names of these are sometimes incorrectly reported as Vela Gulf.

- The first USS Vella Gulf (CVE-111) was an escort carrier in service for just over a year, during 1945 and 1946.
- The second USS Vella Gulf (CG-72) was a guided missile cruiser commissioned in 1993. She was decommissioned in 2022, pending a decision on her fate.
