= USS Tech III =

United States Navy patrol vessel

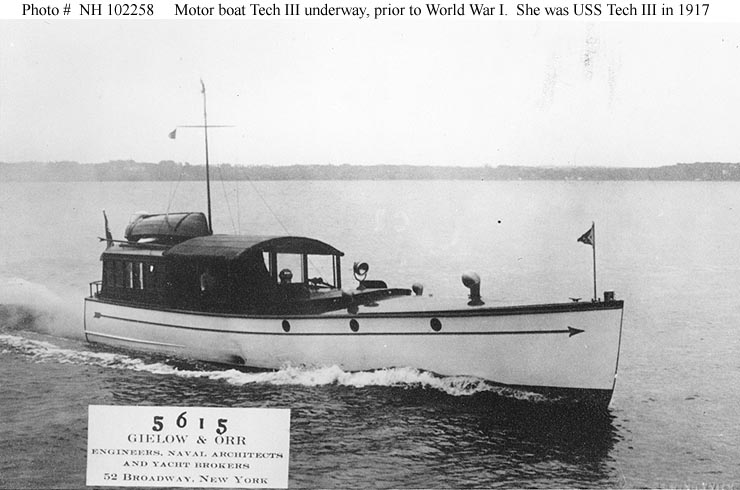
- Tech III as a private motorboat sometime in 1916 or 1917.

History

United States
- Name: USS Tech III
- Namesake: Previous name retained
- Builder: Adolph Apel, Atlantic City, New Jersey
- Completed: 1916
- Acquired: 6 August 1917
- Commissioned: 7 August 1917
- Decommissioned: 19 October 1917
- Stricken: Probably ca. mid-1918
- Fate: Probably returned to owner ca. mid-1918
- Notes: Operated as private motorboat Tech III 1916-1917 and from ca. mid-1918

General characteristics
- Type: Patrol vessel
- Length: 50 ft (15 m)
- Beam: 9 ft (2.7 m)
- Draft: 3 ft 6 in (1.07 m) aft
- Speed: 25 to 30 miles per hour
- Complement: 5
- Armament: 1 × machine gun

USS Tech III (SP-1055) was a United States Navy patrol vessel in commission from August to October 1917.

Tech III was built as a private motorboat of the same name in 1916 by Adolph Apel at Atlantic City, New Jersey. On 6 August 1917, the U.S. Navy leased her from her owner, the engineer and politician T. Coleman du Pont (1863–1930) of Wilmington, Delaware, for use as a section patrol boat during World War I. She was commissioned on 7 August 1917 as USS Tech III (SP-1055).

Assigned to the 4th Naval District, Tech III served on patrol duties there. Although Navy inspectors had described her as a "Very fast and desirable boat for general use" prior to her acquisition, she apparently proved unsatisfactory, and her service ended after less than 2 1/2 months.

Tech III was decommissioned on 19 October 1917 and ordered returned to du Pont "when repaired". Her name did not disappear from the 4th Naval District list of district vessels until the 1 September 1918 issue of the Navy Directory, so she seems to have remained in the possession of the Navy until the summer of 1918. Presumably, she was returned to her owner sometime in mid-1918 and her name was stricken from the Navy List at that time.
