= USS Verna & Esther =

Patrol vessel of the United States Navy

History

United States
- Name: USS Verna & Esther
- Namesake: Previous name retained
- Completed: 1912
- Acquired: 6 August 1917
- Commissioned: 10 September 1917
- Fate: Returned to owner 30 November 1918
- Notes: Operated as private motorboat Verna & Esther 1912-1917 and from 1918

General characteristics
- Type: Patrol vessel
- Tonnage: 12 Gross register tons
- Length: 48 ft 0 in (14.63 m)
- Beam: 10 ft 2 in (3.10 m)
- Draft: 3 ft 6 in (1.07 m) mean
- Depth: 4 ft 8 in (1.42 m)
- Propulsion: Internal combustion engine, one shaft
- Speed: 7 knots
- Complement: 4
- Armament: 1 × 1-pounder gun

USS Verna & Esther (SP-1187) was a United States Navy patrol vessel in commission from 1917 to 1918.

Verna & Esther was built as a private wooden-hulled, single-screw motorboat of the same name in 1912 at Kennebunk, Maine. On 6 August 1917, the U.S. Navy acquired her under a free lease from her owner, Ensign F. K. Williams of Provincetown, Massachusetts, for use as a section patrol boat during World War I. She was commissioned on 10 September 1917 as USS Verna & Esther (SP-1187).

Assigned to the 1st Naval District in northern New England, Verna & Esther served as a target range boat through the end of World War I.

The Navy returned Verna & Esther to Williams on 30 November 1918.
