= USS Tucson =

Two ships of the United States Navy have been named USS Tucson, after the city of Tucson, Arizona.

- USS Tucson (CL-98) was a light cruiser commissioned in 1945, active in the Pacific War for a few weeks before its end, and decommissioned in 1949.
- USS Tucson (SSN-770) is a Los Angeles-class nuclear attack submarine commissioned in 1995 and in active service.
