= USS Verdin =

Two ships of the United States Navy have borne the name USS Verdin:

- USS Verdin (YMS-471) was a YMS-1-class minesweeper that was launched in 1944 and served as YMS-471 until renamed Verdin in 1947.
- USS Verdin (ASR-17) was a projected Chanticleer-class submarine rescue ship, cancelled after the surrender of Japan in 1945.
