= USS Tech Jr. =

Patrol vessel of the United States Navy

History

United States
- Name: USS Tech Jr.
- Namesake: Previous name retained
- Builder: Adolph Apel, Atlantic City, New Jersey
- Completed: 1912
- Acquired: 30 August 1917
- Commissioned: 1917
- Stricken: 27 November 1917
- Fate: Returned to owner 27 November 1917
- Notes: Operated as private motorboat Tech Jr. 1912-1917 and from late 1917

General characteristics
- Type: Patrol vessel
- Length: 20 ft (6.1 m)
- Beam: 8 ft (2.4 m)
- Draft: 2 ft 6 in (0.76 m) aft
- Speed: 30.4 knots

USS Tech Jr. (SP-1761), sometimes written as ID-1761, was a United States Navy patrol vessel in commission during the latter half of 1917.

Tech Jr. was built as a private motorboat of the same name in 1912 by Adolph Apel at Atlantic City, New Jersey. On 30 August 1917, the U.S. Navy leased her from her owners, L. & T. Prettyman of Cambridge, Maryland, for use as a section patrol boat during World War I. She was commissioned as USS Tech Jr. (SP-1761).

Assigned to the 5th Naval District, Tech Jr. apparently was unsatisfactory for naval service and served on patrol duties there only briefly. She was returned to her owners on 27 November 1917 and stricken from the Navy List simultaneously .
