= USS Virginia (SP-274) =

Patrol vessel of the United States Navy

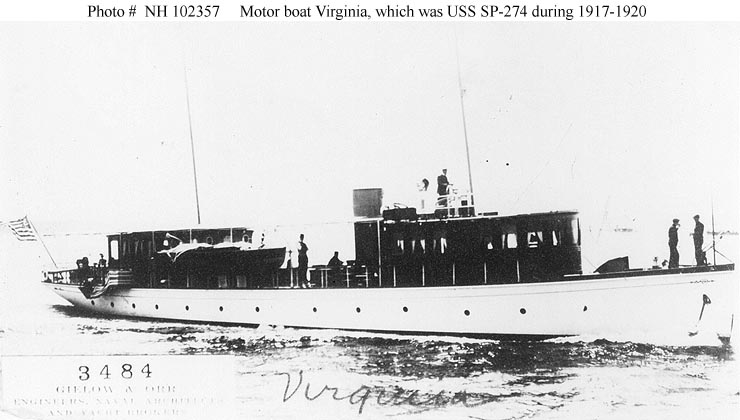
- USS Virginia (SP-274)

History

United States
- Name: USS Virginia
- Builder: Electric Launch Company, Bayonne, New Jersey
- Laid down: 1910
- Acquired: by purchase, 5 May 1917
- Commissioned: 10 August 1917
- Decommissioned: 18 March 1920
- Stricken: 18 March 1920
- Fate: Sunken hulk sold, 1 April 1920

General characteristics
- Type: Motor yacht
- Tonnage: 91 long tons (92 t)
- Length: 98 ft 4 in (29.97 m)
- Beam: 16 ft (4.9 m)
- Draft: 5 ft 6 in (1.68 m)
- Speed: 13 knots (24 km/h; 15 mph)
- Complement: 14
- Armament: 2 × 3-pounder guns

USS Virginia (hull number SP-274) was a yacht in the United States Navy.

She was constructed in 1910 by Elco at Bayonne, New Jersey. The ship was purchased by the Navy on 5 May 1917 from Mr. Daniel W. Smith of Detroit and delivered to the Government on 2 July.

To avoid the confusion of having several ships of the same name, the Navy discarded her name and referred to her simply as SP-274, though references to her as Virginia (SP-274) in the Navy Register for 1918 indicate that she probably retained her name informally. Commissioned on 10 August 1917, SP-274 was assigned to the 9th Naval District section patrol; and, although the records are unclear, she probably operated out of Detroit, conducting patrols on Lake Michigan.

She served until 12 August 1919, at which time her name was struck from the Navy Register; and, by 18 March 1920, she had sunk at the Detroit Dock. Here again, the records are unclear with regard to whether she sank before or after being struck. In any event, her sunken hulk was sold to J. A. Nicholson of Morris Heights, New Jersey, on 1 April 1920.
