= USS T-2 =

USS T-2 has been the name of more than one United States Navy ship, and may refer to:

- USS T-2 (SS-60), later SF-2, a fleet submarine in commission from 1922 to 1923
- USS T-2 (SST-2), a training submarine in commission from 1953 to 1973, renamed USS Marlin (SST-2) in 1956
