= USS Tasco =

Patrol vessel of the United States Navy

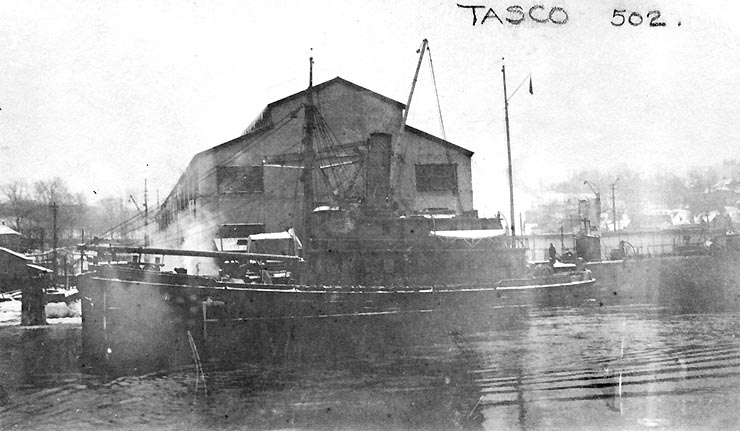
- Tasco as a commercial tug, probably sometime between 1907 and 1917.

History

United States
- Name: USS Tasco
- Namesake: Previous name retained
- Completed: 1907
- Acquired: 4 August 1917
- Commissioned: 29 September 1917
- Stricken: 22 May 1919
- Fate: Returned to owner 22 May 1919
- Notes: Operated as commercial tug Tasco 1907-1917 and from 1919

General characteristics
- Type: Minesweeper and patrol vessel
- Tonnage: 319 gross register tons
- Length: 109 ft (33 m)
- Beam: 32 ft 4 in (9.86 m)
- Draft: 12 ft (3.7 m) aft
- Propulsion: Steam engine
- Speed: 10 knots
- Complement: 16
- Armament: 2 × 1-pounder guns

USS Tasco (SP-502), was a United States Navy minesweeper and patrol vessel in commission from 1917 to 1919.

Tasco was built as a commercial tug of the same name in 1907 at New London, Connecticut. The U.S. Navy acquired her from her owner, J. Shewan of Brooklyn, New York, on 4 August 1917 for use as a minesweeper and section patrol vessel during World War I. She was commissioned as USS Tasco (SP-502) on 29 September 1917.

Assigned to the 3rd Naval District, Tasco operated along the coastline in the New York City area for the remainder of World War I and into the spring of 1919.

Tasco was stricken from the Navy List on 22 May 1919 and returned to Shewan the same day.
