= USS Vireo =

USS Vireo is a name used more than once by the United States Navy:

- USS Vireo (AM-52), a minesweeper laid down on 20 November 1918 by the Philadelphia Navy Yard; launched on 26 May 1919.
- USS Vireo (MSC-205), a minesweeper laid down as AMS-205 on 14 September 1953 at the Bellingham Shipyards, Bellingham, Washington.
