= USS Victorious =

USS Victorious is a name used more than once by the U.S. Navy:

- USS Victorious (ID-3514), a steel-hulled, single-screw cargo vessel commissioned at San Francisco, California, on 19 October 1918.
- USNS Victorious (T-AGOS-19), an ocean surveillance ship delivered to the Navy, 13 August 1991.

== See also ==
- Victorious (disambiguation)
- Victorious-class ocean surveillance ship
