= USS Urgent =

General characteristics (If completed)
- Type: Bolster-class rescue and salvage ship
- Displacement: 1,497 long tons (1,521 t) (lt); 2,048 long tons (2,081 t) (fl)
- Length: 213 ft 6 in (65.07 m)
- Beam: 39 ft (12 m)
- Propulsion: diesel-electric, twin screws, 2,780 hp (2,070 kW)
- Speed: 15 knots (28 km/h; 17 mph)
- Complement: 100
- Armament: 2 × 40 mm guns

USS Urgent (ARS-48), a Bolster-class rescue and salvage ship, was scheduled to be built at Napa, California, by the Basalt Rock Co., Inc.; but the end of the war in the Pacific removed the need for the ship. Accordingly, the contract for building the vessel was terminated on 12 August 1945.
