= USS Tallapoosa =

Two ships in the United States Navy have been named USS Tallapoosa for the Tallapoosa River.

- USS Tallapoosa (1863) was a steamship during the American Civil War.
- USCGC Tallapoosa (WPG-52) was a United States Coast Guard cutter built in 1915 and taken in the Navy during World War I.
