= USS Tonawanda =

USS Tonawanda is a name used more than once by the United States Navy:

- USS Tonawanda (1864), a monitor operating during the American Civil War.
- USS Tonawanda (AN-89), a World War II net laying ship.
