= USS Tacony =

USS Tacony is a name used more than once by the United States Navy, and may refer to:

- USS Tacony (1863), a gunboat in commission from 1864 to 1867 which saw action during the American Civil War
- USS Tacony (SP-5), a patrol vessel in commission from 1917 to 1918.

== See also ==
- CSS Tacony, a Confederate States Navy vessel in commission briefly during June 1863
