= USS Trilby =

Patrol vessel of the United States Navy

History

United States
- Name: USS Trilby
- Namesake: Previous name retained (for Trilby O'Ferrall, the heroine of the 1894 novel Trilby by George du Maurier (1834–1896))
- Acquired: 29 June 1917
- Commissioned: Possibly 13 July 1917
- Decommissioned: Possibly November 1917
- Fate: Returned to owner 5 July 1918
- Notes: Operated as private motorboat Trilby until 1917 and from 1918

General characteristics
- Type: Patrol vessel
- Length: 37 ft (11 m)
- Beam: 7 ft 8 in (2.34 m)
- Draft: 3 ft 0 in (0.91 m) forward
- Complement: 4
- Armament: 1 × machine gun

USS Trilby (SP-673) was a United States Navy patrol vessel in commission during 1917.

Trilby was built as a private wooden-hulled motorboat of the same name. On 29 June 1917, the U.S. Navy acquired her from her owner, Carl E. Milliken (1877–1961), the Governor of Maine (1917–1921), for use as a section patrol boat during World War I. She received the section patrol number SP-673 on 13 July 1917 and was commissioned as USS Trilby (SP-673).

Assigned to the 1st Naval District in northern New England, Trilby conducted patrols in the harbor at Bath, Maine, beginning on 11 August 1917. She soon was declared unfit for naval use; no records exist documenting Tilby's naval service beyond 11 November 1917.

Trilby was returned to Governor Milliken on 5 July 1918.
