= USS Valor =

USS Valor may refer to the following ships of the United States Navy:

- USS Valor (AMc-108), was a coastal minesweeper placed in service in March 1942 and sunk in June 1944
- USS Valor (AM-472), was an ocean minesweeper commissioned in July 1954 and sold for scrap in August 1971
