= USS Thatcher =

USS Thatcher may refer to:

- USS Thatcher (DD-162), a Wickes-class destroyer launched in 1918. She was transferred to Canada in 1940 and recommissioned HMCS Niagara (I57). She was decommissioned in 1945 and scrapped the following year.
- USS Thatcher (DD-514), a Fletcher-class destroyer, launched in 1942 and struck in 1945.
