= USS Tunxis =

USS Tunxis is a name used more than once by the United States Navy:

- USS Tunxis (1864), an American Civil War monitor
- USS Tunxis (AN-90), a World War II net laying ship
