= USS Trepang =

Two submarines of the United States Navy have been named USS Trepang, after the trepang, a marine animal that has a long, tough, muscular body, sometimes called a sea slug or a sea cucumber, found in the coral reefs of the East Indies.

- USS Trepang (SS-412), a Balao-class submarine, served during World War II.
- USS Trepang (SSN-674), a Sturgeon-class submarine, served during the Cold War.
