= USS Virginia (SP-1965) =

Two-masted auxiliary schooner

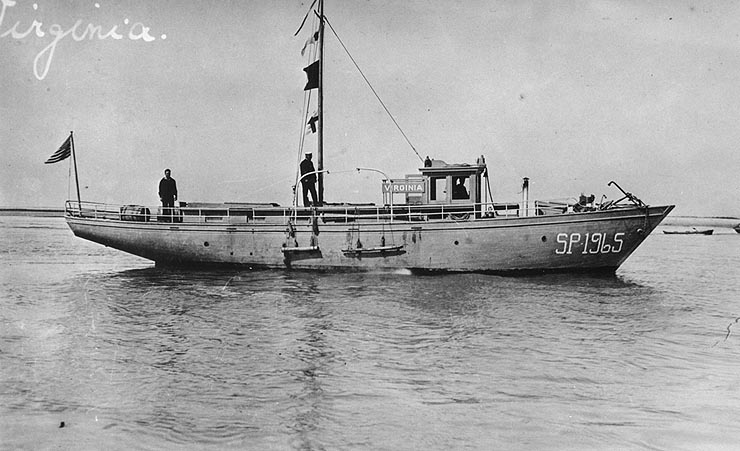
- USS Virginia (SP-1965)

History

United States
- Name: USS Virginia
- Namesake: Commonwealth of Virginia
- Builder: F. W. McCullough, Norfolk, Virginia
- Laid down: 1902
- Acquired: by lease, 24 December 1917
- Commissioned: 24 December 1917
- Decommissioned: 3 January 1919
- Stricken: 3 January 1919
- Fate: Returned to original owner, 1919

General characteristics
- Type: Schooner
- Displacement: 35 long tons (36 t)
- Length: 61 ft (19 m)
- Beam: 15 ft 8 in (4.78 m)
- Draft: 5 ft (1.5 m)
- Speed: 8 knots (15 km/h; 9.2 mph)
- Complement: 8

USS Virginia (hull number SP-1965) was a two-masted, auxiliary schooner in the United States Navy.

Virginia, built in 1902 by F. W. McCullough at Norfolk, Virginia, was acquired by the US Navy on Christmas Eve of 1917 under free lease from W. M. Holland of Norfolk.

In Navy records, she does not appear as an active unit until July 1918 when she was listed in the Navy Directory as a unit of the 5th Naval District section patrol force — probably operating in and around Norfolk. Initially, she retained the name Virginia semi-officially and was so listed in several editions of the 1918 Navy Directory. However, after December 1918, she was carried on all Navy records as USS SP-1965, but frequently with a parenthetical Virginia added after the official designation. The schooner served the Navy until 3 January 1919 when her name was struck from the Navy List, and she was returned to her owner.
