= USS Underwriter =

USS Underwriter is a name used more than once by the U.S. Navy:

- USS Underwriter (1852), a steamer purchased by the Navy on 23 August 1861.
- USS Underwriter (1880), a tugboat that served during World War I.
