= USS Toxaway =

Patrol vessel of the United States Navy

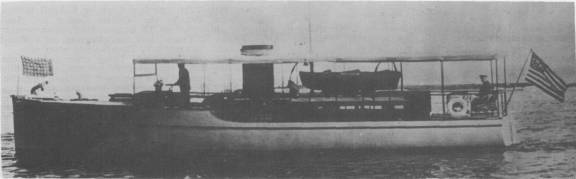
- Toxaway as a private motorboat sometime in 1917, prior to her United States Navy service.

History

United States
- Name: USS Toxaway
- Namesake: Previous name retained
- Builder: Charles L. Seabury Company and Gas Engine & Power Company, Morris Heights, the Bronx, New York
- Completed: 1917
- Acquired: 9 June 1917
- Commissioned: 12 June 1917
- Fate: Returned to owner 2 December 1918
- Notes: Operated as private motorboat Toxaway 1917 and from 1918

General characteristics
- Type: Patrol vessel
- Tonnage: 9 Gross register tons
- Length: 52 ft (16 m)
- Beam: 11 ft 3 in (3.43 m)
- Draft: 2 ft 6 in (0.76 m) mean
- Speed: 13.8 knots (25.6 km/h)
- Complement: 9
- Armament: 1 × 1-pounder gun; 1 × machine gun

USS Toxaway (SP-743) was a United States Navy patrol vessel in commission from 1917 to 1918.

Toxaway was built as a private motorboat of the same name in 1917 by the Charles L. Seabury Company and the Gas Engine & Power Company at Morris Heights in the Bronx, New York. On 9 June 1917, the U.S. Navy acquired her from her owner, J. H. Nunnally, for use as a section patrol boat during World War I. She was commissioned as USS Toxaway (SP-743) on 12 June 1917.

Assigned to the 2nd Naval District in southern New England and based at Newport, Rhode Island, Toxaway served on section patrol duties for the rest of World War I.

Toxaway was returned to Nunnally on 2 December 1918.
