= USS Towaliga =

History

United States
- Name: USS Towaliga (AOG-42)
- Namesake: Towaliga River
- Ordered: as T1-M-A2 tanker hull, MC 2068
- Builder: East Coast Shipyard, Bayonne, New Jersey
- Yard number: 24
- Laid down: 29 September 1944
- Launched: 29 October 1944
- Commissioned: 14 December 1944
- Decommissioned: 10 May 1947
- Stricken: 12 March 1948
- Fate: transferred to the Republic of China, 1947

History

Taiwan
- Name: ROCS Tai Hwa
- Acquired: 1947
- Renamed: ROCS Hsing Kao, 1955
- Fate: unknown

General characteristics
- Class & type: Mettawee-class gasoline tanker
- Tonnage: 1,228 long tons deadweight (DWT)
- Displacement: 846 tons(lt) 2,270 tons(fl)
- Length: 220 ft 6 in (67.21 m)
- Beam: 37 ft (11 m)
- Draft: 17 ft (5.2 m)
- Propulsion: Diesel direct drive, single screw, 720 hp
- Speed: 10 knots (19 km/h)
- Complement: 62
- Armament: one single 3 in (76 mm) dual purpose gun mount, two 40 mm guns, three single 20 mm guns gun mounts

USS Towaliga (AOG-42) was a Mettawee-class gasoline tanker acquired by the U.S. Navy for the dangerous task of transporting gasoline to warships in the fleet, and to remote Navy stations.

Towaliga was laid down under Maritime Commission contract (MC hull 2068) on 29 September 1944 at Bayonne, New Jersey, by the East Coast Shipyard Inc.; launched on 29 October 1944; sponsored by Mrs. Michael Canose; acquired by the Navy on 6 December 1944; and commissioned on 14 December 1944.

== World War II service ==
The gasoline tanker called at Norfolk, Virginia, on 9 January 1945 and began shakedown training in the Chesapeake Bay the next day. On 11 February, she joined a convoy bound for the West Indies and arrived at Aruba, Netherlands Antilles, 10 days later.

=== Pacific Ocean operations ===
After filling her cargo tanks, the ship proceeded through the Panama Canal to the U.S. West Coast, spent 14 March and 15 March at San Diego, California, and sailed for Hawaii on the 16th. She reached Pearl Harbor on 28 March and, for the next four months, shuttled diesel oil and aviation gasoline from Hawaii to Johnston Island. In mid August, while the ship was undergoing an overhaul in dry dock at Pearl Harbor, hostilities ended.

=== End-of-war activity ===
Upon completion of the yard work, Towaliga got underway for Japan and, after stops at Eniwetok and Saipan, arrived at Osaka on 9 October 1945. The ship operated from Osaka until 16 August 1946 when she was ordered to China. She arrived at Qingdao on the 19th and was placed in a standby status with a reduced crew, preparatory to being decommissioned. On 6 December, the ship's complement was filled, and she began training Chinese crews.

== Post-war decommissioning ==
Towaliga was decommissioned on 10 May 1947 and transferred to the Republic of China under the lend-lease program. The ship was nominally returned to the United States on 17 February 1948 but simultaneously transferred permanently to China, where she was renamed Tai Hwa. Towaliga was struck from the Navy list on 12 March 1948. Final disposition: fate unknown.

== Military awards and honors ==
Towaliga’s crew was eligible for the following medals:

- China Service Medal (extended)
- American Campaign Medal
- Asiatic-Pacific Campaign Medal
- World War II Victory Medal
- Navy Occupation Service Medal (with Asia clasp)
