= USS Tautog =

USS Tautog may refer to the following ships of the United States Navy:

- USS Tautog (SS-199), a Tambor-class submarine launched in 1940 and stricken from the Naval Vessel Register in 1959
- USS Tautog (SSN-639), a Sturgeon-class submarine launched in 1967 and stricken from the Naval Vessel Register in 1997
