= USS Undine =

Two ships in the United States Navy have been named USS Undine.

- The first USS Undine (1863) was a steamer built in 1863 that served in the American Civil War, first in the Union Navy and later captured by Colonel Nathan Bedford Forrest of the Confederate States Army in October, 1864 at Fort Heiman on the Tennessee River. It was burned to the waterline and sunk by the Confederates to keep it from falling back into Union hands.
- The second USS Undine (1893) was built in 1893 and served out of the New York Navy Yard until 1910.
