= USS Transfer =

History

United States
- Builder: New York Navy Yard
- Laid down: 18 August 1904
- Launched: 24 May 1905
- Decommissioned: 8 February 1934
- In service: 19 July 1910
- Stricken: 16 September 1945
- Fate: Sold for scrap 8 April 1945

General characteristics
- Displacement: 700 tons
- Length: 110 ft 0 in (33.53 m)
- Beam: 30 ft 0 in (9.14 m)
- Draft: 10 ft 0 in (3.05 m)
- Speed: 8 knots

USS Transfer was a steam-propelled, derrick-rigged freight lighter. She was laid down on 18 August 1904 at the New York Navy Yard, launched on 24 May 1905 and placed in service at New York on 19 July 1910, but apparently in service earlier according to a reported slight collision with the tug H. M. Whitney off Jackson street in the East River on 25 June 1908.

Transfer spent her entire Navy career in the 3rd Naval District assigned to the New York Navy Yard. Though initially carried on the Navy list as a tugboat, she performed all varied duties of a freight lighter, primarily transporting people, cargo, stores, and other items between ships and shore.

Records documenting the milestones of the ship's career are sparse; but according to DANFS we can assume that she was commissioned sometime during her first dozen years of service since documents indicate that she was decommissioned on 6 October 1922. She remained in that status until 6 February 1924 when she was recommissioned to replace Traffic. Ten years later, YF-211 took over her duties; and Transfer was decommissioned once again on 8 February 1934.

Transfer apparently remained out of commission for the remainder of her career, though in all probability, she continued to serve the Navy. Little is known of her service, but her boiler plant provided heat to the cruisers Honolulu and Helena during the winter of 1938 and 1939 while the former underwent post-shakedown availability and the latter completed construction. On 8 March 1941, Transfer received the alpha-numeric designation, IX-46. Transfer's name was struck from the Navy list on 16 September 1945 as a result of an inspection and survey. In January 1945, the Commandant, 3rd Naval District, was authorized to dispose of her and sold her for scrapping on 8 April 1945.
