= USS Tullibee =

USS Tullibee has been the name of more than one United States Navy ship, and may refer to:

- USS Tullibee (SS-284), a submarine commissioned in 1943 and sunk in 1944
- USS Tullibee (SSN-597), a submarine in commission from 1960 to 1988
