= USS Twiggs =

Two ships of the United States Navy have borne the name USS Twiggs, named in honor of Marine Major Levi Twiggs (1793–1847).

- USS Twiggs (DD-127) was a Wickes-class destroyer, launched in 1918. She was transferred to the United Kingdom in 1940 as HMS Leamington. She was subsequently transferred to the Royal Canadian Navy in 1942, back to the Royal Navy in 1943, and to the Soviet Navy in 1944 who renamed her Jgoochyi or Zhguchi. She was returned to Great Britain in 1950, and scrapped 1951.
- USS Twiggs (DD-591) was a Fletcher-class destroyer, launched in 1943 and sunk during the Battle of Okinawa in 1945.
