= USS Tocsam =

Patrol vessel of the United States Navy

History

United States
- Name: USS Tocsam
- Namesake: Previous name retained
- Builder: Landing Yacht Building Company, Oxford, Maryland
- Completed: 1910
- Acquired: 2 July 1918
- Commissioned: 21 August 1918
- Decommissioned: 15 December 1918
- Fate: Returned to owner 16 December 1918
- Notes: Operated as private motorboat Tocsam 1910-1918 and from December 1918

General characteristics
- Type: Patrol vessel
- Tonnage: 13 Gross register tons
- Length: 41 ft (12 m)
- Beam: 10 ft 1 in (3.07 m)
- Draft: 3 ft 0 in (0.91 m) mean
- Complement: 6
- Armament: None

USS Tocsam was a United States Navy patrol vessel in commission from August to December 1918.

Tocsam was built in 1910 as a private motorboat of the same name by the Landing Yacht Building Company at Oxford, Maryland. On 2 July 1918, the U.S. Navy acquired her from her owner, G. H. Lohr, for use as a section patrol boat during World War I. She never received a section patrol (SP) number, but was commissioned at Charleston, South Carolina, as USS Tocsam on 21 August 1918.

Tocsam served on section patrol duties in the Charleston area for the rest of World War I. She was decommissioned on 15 December 1918 and returned to Lohr on 16 December 1918.
