= USS Tutuila =

USS Tutuila may refer to the following ships of the United States Navy:

- USS Tutuila (PG-44), was launched 14 June 1927 and transferred to China under Lend-Lease in 1942
- USS Tutuila (ARG-4), was launched 12 September 1943, as SS Arthur P. Gorman, and sold to the Republic of China in 1972
