= USS Vigilant (SP-406) =

Patrol vessel of the United States Navy

History

United States
- Name: USS Vigilant (1917-1918); USS SP-406 (1918)
- Namesake: Vigilant was her previous name retained; SP-406 was her section patrol number
- Builder: Henry L. Blatz, Philadelphia, Pennsylvania
- Completed: 1909
- Acquired: 1917
- Commissioned: 19 May 1917
- Decommissioned: 24 December 1918
- Fate: Returned to owner
- Notes: Operated as private motorboat Marguerite II and Vigilant 1909-1917 and Vigilant from 1918

General characteristics
- Type: Section patrol vessel
- Tonnage: 41 gross register tons
- Length: 72 ft 0 in (21.95 m)
- Beam: 14 ft 0 in (4.27 m)
- Draft: 3 ft 8 in (1.12 m)
- Complement: 14
- Armament: 1 × 1-pounder gun; 1 × machine gun; 4 × depth charges

The third USS Vigilant (SP-406), later USS SP-406, was a United States Navy Section patrol vessel in commission from 1917 to 1918.

Vigilant was built as the private motorboat Marguerite II in 1909 by Henry L. Blatz at Philadelphia, Pennsylvania. Marguerite II was prominent in racing and often served as stake boat with the Delaware River Yacht Racing Association while owned by A. B. Cartledge. Upon sale to Edward B. Smith of Philadelphia the vessel was renamed Vigilant. The U.S. Navy acquired her from her owner in 1917 for use as a section patrol vessel during World War I. She was commissioned as USS Vigilant (SP-406) on 19 May 1917 at the Philadelphia Navy Yard.

On 28 May 1917, Vigilant proceeded from Philadelphia to Essington, Pennsylvania, for installation of her armament. She loaded ammunition at Fort Mifflin on 5 June 1917, then reported to the 4th Naval District for duty on 7 June 1917. For the remainder of World War I, Vigilant patrolled the Delaware Bay and the Atlantic coast of the United States from Atlantic City, New Jersey, to the mouth of the Chesapeake Bay. She also carried messages, men, and mail to ships and stations within the 4th Naval District. Occasionally, she ventured out to sea to search for survivors of torpedoed merchant ships, as she did on 9 June 1918 after a German submarine had sunk SS Del Rio.

In 1918, Vigilant was renamed USS SP-406, apparently to avoid confusion with the tug USS Vigilant, which was in commission at the same time.

After World War I ended on 11 November 1918 and defensive patrols were suspended on 24 November, SP-406 proceeded to Philadelphia early in December 1918 for inactivation. She was decommissioned there on 24 December 1918 and was returned to her owner.
