= USS Tinosa =

USS Tinosa has been the name of more than one United States Navy ship, and may refer to:

- USS Tinosa (SS-283), a submarine in commission from 1943 to 1949 and from 1952 to 1953
- USS Tinosa (SSN-606), a submarine in commission from 1964 to 1992
