= USS Tonkawa =

USS Tonkawa is a name used more than once by the United States Navy:

- USS Tonkawa (ATA-176) was laid down as ATR-103 on 30 January 1944 at Orange, Texas.
- Tonkawa (YTB-710), a Hisada-class tugboat, was slated to be built at San Pedro, California, by the Bethlehem Steel Co., but the contract for her construction was canceled on 1 October 1945.
- USS Tonkawa (YTB-786), a Natick-class tugboat serving from 1966 to 2000.
