= USS The Sullivans =

USS The Sullivans may refer to:

- USS The Sullivans (DD-537), is a Fletcher-class destroyer, launched in 1943, decommissioned in 1965 and donated in 1977 to the Buffalo and Erie County Naval & Military Park and serves as a museum ship
- USS The Sullivans (DDG-68), is an Arleigh Burke-class destroyer launched in 1995 and currently in service
