= USS Turkey =

USS Turkey may refer to:

- USS Turkey (AM-13), laid down on 19 August 1917 at Chester, Pennsylvania
- USS Turkey (AMS-56), laid down as YMS-444 on 16 November 1943 at Kingston, New York
