= USS Upshur =

Two ships of the United States Navy have been assigned the name USS Upshur, in honor of individuals whose last name was Upshur.

- The first, USS Upshur (DD-144), was a Wickes-class destroyer, launched in 1918 and struck in 1945 was named for Rear Admiral John Henry Upshur.
- The second, USNS Upshur (T-AP-198), was a Barrett-class troop ship named for Major General William P. Upshur, USMC.
