= USS Tortuga =

Two dock landing ships of the United States Navy have been named USS Tortuga, after the Dry Tortugas, islands off Florida.

- The first USS Tortuga (LSD-26) was commissioned in 1945, in action during the Korean War and the Vietnam War, and decommissioned in 1970.
- The second USS Tortuga (LSD-46) was commissioned in 1990 and is on active service as of 2016.
