= USS Trumbull =

USS Trumbull may refer to the following ships of the United States Navy:

- USS Trumbull (1776 row galley), a shoal-draft row galley built on Lake Champlain at Skenesboro, New York
- USS Trumbull (1776), one of the 13 frigates authorized by the Continental Congress on 13 December 1775.
- USS Trumbull (1799), an 18 gun sloop-of-war constructed by Naval Agent Joseph Howland between 1799 and 1800.
