= USS Tarrant =

Cargo ship of the United States Navy

History

United States
- Name: Tarrant
- Namesake: Tarrant County, Texas
- Ordered: as type (C1-M-AV1) hull, MC hull 2168
- Builder: Leathem D. Smith Shipbuilding Company, Sturgeon Bay, Wisconsin
- Yard number: 334
- Laid down: 4 December 1944
- Launched: 25 February 1945
- Sponsored by: Miss Agnes Larson
- Commissioned: 18 September 1945
- Decommissioned: 21 November 1945
- Stricken: 5 December 1945
- Identification: Hull symbol: AK-214; Code letters: NXPI
- Fate: Sold, 15 March 1947, to Brazieiro Patrisonio Nacional; Scrapped 1969

General characteristics
- Class & type: Alamosa-class cargo ship
- Type: C1-M-AV1
- Tonnage: 5,032 long tons deadweight (DWT)
- Displacement: 2,382 long tons (2,420 t) (standard); 7,450 long tons (7,570 t) (full load)
- Length: 388 ft 8 in (118.47 m)
- Beam: 50 ft (15 m)
- Draft: 21 ft 1 in (6.43 m)
- Installed power: 1 × Nordberg, TSM 6 diesel engine; 1,750 shp (1,300 kW)
- Propulsion: 1 × propeller
- Speed: 11.5 kn (21.3 km/h; 13.2 mph)
- Capacity: 3,945 t (3,883 long tons) DWT; 9,830 cu ft (278 m^{3}) (refrigerated); 227,730 cu ft (6,449 m^{3}) (non-refrigerated)
- Complement: 15 Officers; 70 Enlisted
- Armament: 1 × 3 in (76 mm)/50-caliber dual-purpose gun (DP); 6 × 20 mm (0.8 in) Oerlikon anti-aircraft (AA) cannons

USS Tarrant (AK-214) was an Alamosa-class cargo ship that was constructed for the US Navy during the closing period of World War II. She was commissioned; however, the war ended and she was returned to the War Shipping Administration in November 1945 for disposal.

== Construction ==
Tarrant was laid down under US Maritime Commission (MARCOM) contract, MC hull 2168, on 4 December 1944, by the Leathem D. Smith Shipbuilding Company, Sturgeon Bay, Wisconsin; launched on 25 February 1945; sponsored by Miss Agnes Larson; and commissioned on 18 September 1945.

== World War II-related service ==
Tarrant and her U.S. Coast Guard crew reported to the Commander in Chief, Atlantic Fleet, on 24 September as available for her shakedown cruise. However, since World War II had ended, she was ordered to report to the commandant, 8th Naval District for disposal.

== Service history ==
Tarrant and her Coast Guard crew reported to the Commander in Chief, US Atlantic Fleet, on 24 September as available for her shakedown cruise. However, since World War II had ended, she was ordered to report to the commandant, 8th Naval District for disposal.

Tarrant reported on 30 September and was decommissioned and returned to the War Shipping Administration (WSA) on 21 November. Tarrant was struck from the Navy list on 6 December 1945.

== Merchant service ==
She was sold to Brazieiro Patrisonio Nacional, 15 March 1947. She was later scrapped in 1969.

== Notes ==
Citations

== Bibliography ==
Online resources

- "Tarrant". Dictionary of American Naval Fighting Ships. Naval History and Heritage Command. This article incorporates text from this source, which is in the public domain.
- "C1 Cargo Ships". www.ShipbuildingHistory.com. 28 August 2009.
- "USS Tarrant (AK-214)". NavSource. 8 November 2013.
