= USS Vester =

Patrol vessel of the United States Navy

History

United States
- Name: USS Vester
- Namesake: Previous name retained
- Completed: 1876
- Acquired: 24 May 1917
- Commissioned: 2 June 1917
- Decommissioned: 15 May 1919
- Fate: Sold 15 January 1920
- Notes: Operated as commercial freight boat Vester 1876-1917

General characteristics
- Type: Patrol vessel and minesweeper
- Tonnage: 117 Gross register tons
- Length: 96 ft 4 in (29.36 m)
- Beam: 18 ft 4 in (5.59 m)
- Draft: 5 ft 9 in (1.75 m) mean
- Propulsion: Single-expansion steam engine
- Speed: 7.6 knots
- Complement: 24
- Armament: 2 × 1-pounder guns

USS Vester (SP-686) was a United States Navy patrol vessel and minesweeper in commission from 1917 to 1919.

Vester was built as a wooden-hulled commercial freight boat of the same name at Boothbay, Maine, in 1876. On 24 May 1917, the U.S. Navy acquired her from her owner, the Delaware Fish Oil Company, for use as a section patrol boat during World War I. She was commissioned on 2 June 1917 as USS Vester (SP-686.

Assigned to the 4th Naval District, Vester operated on patrol duties until 21 October 1917, when she was transferred to the naval district's minesweeping squadron, based at the section base at Lewes, Delaware. Plagued by engine problems, she apparently was unable to carry out many operations with the squadron, spending most of her time alongside the pier. On 11 September 1918, she was transferred back to patrol duties, which she carried out as much as her troublesome engine would permit through the end of World War I and until May 1919.

On 15 May 1919, Vester was decommissioned at Cape May, New Jersey. She was sold to Hayes and Anderton of New York City on 15 January 1920.
