= USS Vital =

The United States Navy lists two warships bearing the name USS Vital:

- USS Vital (AM-129), a steel-hulled minesweeper, laid down on 1 January 1942 at Chickasaw, Alabama.
- USS Vital (MSO-474), a wooden-hulled minesweeper, laid down as AM-474 on 31 October 1952 at Manitowoc, Wisconsin.
