= USS Tulip =

USS Tulip is a name used more than once by the United States Navy:

- USS Tulip (1862), a tugboat employed by the Union Navy during the American Civil War.
- USS Tulip (1908), a lighthouse tender serving during World War I.
