= USS Vega =

USS Vega may refer to the following ships of the United States Navy:

- USS Vega (SP-734), was a steel-hulled, steam yacht built in 1907; acquired by the U.S. Navy during World War I and sold in 1921
- USS Vega (AK-17), a single-screw, steel-hulled freighter built in 1919 and scrapped in 1946
- USS Vega (AF-59), was a stores ship launched on 28 April 1955 and sold in 1977
