= USS Talofa =

Patrol vessel of the United States Navy

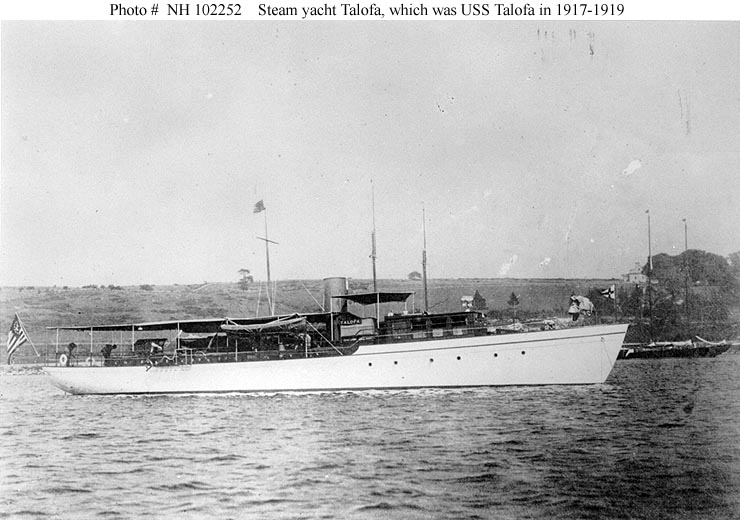
- Talofa as a private yacht sometime between 1910 and 1917.

History

United States
- Name: USS Talofa
- Namesake: Previous name retained
- Builder: George Lawley & Son, Neponset, Massachusetts
- Completed: 1910
- Acquired: 16 or 28 April 1917
- Commissioned: 16 April or 8 May 1917
- Fate: Returned to owner 24 April 1919
- Notes: Operated as private yacht Talofa 1910-1917 and from 1919

General characteristics
- Type: Patrol vessel
- Tonnage: 82 Gross register tons
- Length: 101 ft 0 in (30.78 m)
- Beam: 15 ft 0 in (4.57 m)
- Draft: 5 ft 6 in (1.68 m) mean
- Propulsion: Steam engine
- Speed: 12 knots
- Complement: 19
- Armament: 2 × 3-pounder guns

USS Talofa (SP-1016) was a United States Navy patrol vessel in commission from 1917 to 1919.

Talofa was built in 1910 as a private steam yacht of the same name by George Lawley & Son at Neponset, Massachusetts. In April 1917, the U.S. Navy acquired her under a free lease from her owner, Eben H. Ellison, for use as a section patrol boat during World War I; sources disagree on the date of acquisition, claiming both 16 and 28 April 1917. She was commissioned as USS Talofa (SP-1016); sources also disagree on her commissioning date, claiming both 16 April and 8 May 1917.

Assigned to the 1st Naval District in northern New England, Talofa carried out patrol duties through the end of World War I and into 1919.

The Navy returned Talofa to Ellison by no later than 24 April 1919, and her name subsequently was stricken from the Navy List.
