= USS Unit =

Tugboat of the United States Navy

History

United States
- Ordered: as Union
- Laid down: date unknown
- Launched: 1862
- Acquired: 2 June 1864
- In service: 1864
- Out of service: 1865
- Stricken: 1865 (est.)
- Fate: Sold, 12 July 1865

General characteristics
- Displacement: 57 tons
- Length: not known
- Beam: not known
- Draught: 8 ft (2.4 m)
- Propulsion: steam engine; screw-propelled
- Speed: 7.5 knots
- Complement: not known
- Armament: none indicated

USS Unit was a steamer acquired by the Union Navy during the American Civil War.

She was used as a tugboat by the Navy and she provided her services to ships in the blockade squadrons. She also served as a repair tender for ships needing her services.

== Service during the American Civil War ==
Unit—steamer Union built at Philadelphia in 1862—was purchased at Boston on 2 June 1864. Unit was assigned to the North Atlantic Blockading Squadron and served as a tug and repair vessel in Hampton Roads, Virginia, for the duration of the Civil War. In June 1865, the tug was sent to New York City.

== End-of-war decommission and continued maritime career ==
Unit was sold at auction there on 12 July 1865 to C. and E. T. Peters. Redocumented as a merchant steamer on 6 September 1865, Unit remained in mercantile service until 1902.
