= USS Vulcan =

USS Vulcan is a name used more than once by the U.S. Navy:

- USS Vulcan (1884), a schooner commissioned on 31 May 1898.
- USS Vulcan (AC-5), a collier commissioned 2 October 1909.
- USS Vulcan (AR-5), a repair ship commissioned 14 June 1941.
