= USS Unadilla =

USS Unadilla may refer to one of the following ships of the United States Navy:

- USS Unadilla (1861) was a 507-ton steam operated gunboat acquired by the Union Navy during the American Civil War.
- USS Unadilla (YT-4) a district harbor tug laid down in 1895 and struck in 1947.
- USS Unadilla (ATA-182) a Sotoyomo-class tugboat serving from 1944 to 1961
