= USS Toad =

Patrol vessel of the United States Navy

History

United States
- Name: USS Toad
- Namesake: Previous name retained
- Builder: D. R. Shackford
- Completed: 1914
- Acquired: 4 August 1918
- Commissioned: 4 September 1918
- Fate: Returned to owner 27 January 1919
- Notes: Operated as private motorboat Toad 1914-1918 and from 1919

General characteristics
- Type: Patrol vessel
- Length: 26 ft 0 in (7.92 m)
- Beam: 5 ft 6 in (1.68 m)
- Speed: 16.5 knots
- Complement: 5

USS Toad was a United States Navy patrol vessel in commission from 1918 to 1919.

Toad was built in 1914 as a private motorboat of the same name by D. R. Shackford. On 4 August 1918, the U.S. Navy acquired her from Shackford for use as a section patrol boat during World War I. She never received a section patrol (SP) number, but was commissioned as USS Toad on 4 September 1918.

Assigned to the 5th Naval District, Toad served on section patrol duties for the rest of World War I. The Navy returned her to Shackford on 27 January 1919.
