= USS Vivace =

Patrol vessel of the United States Navy

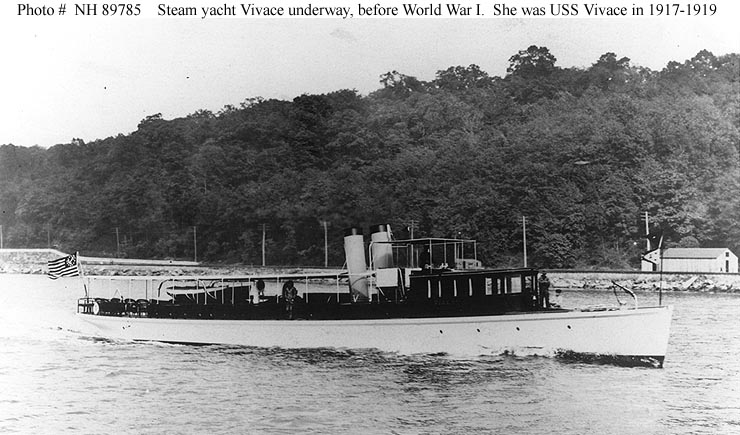
- Vivace as a private yacht sometime between 1904 and 1917.

History

United States
- Name: USS Vivace
- Namesake: Previous name retained
- Builder: Charles L. Seabury Company and Gas Engine and Power Company, Morris Heights, the Bronx, New York
- Completed: 1904
- Acquired: 29 June 1917
- Commissioned: 20 September 1917
- Decommissioned: 28 September 1918
- Stricken: 28 September 1918
- Fate: Sold as "junk" 16 April 1919
- Notes: Operated as private yacht Vixen and Vivace 1904-1917

General characteristics
- Type: Patrol vessel
- Tonnage: 66 net register tons
- Length: 118 ft 0 in (35.97 m)
- Beam: 12 ft 0 in (3.66 m)
- Draft: 4 ft 3 in (1.30 m) aft
- Depth: 7 ft 6 in (2.29 m)
- Propulsion: Steam engine
- Speed: 22 knots
- Complement: 12
- Armament: 1 × 3-pounder gun; 1 × 1-pounder gun; 2 × .30-caliber (7.62-mm) machine guns

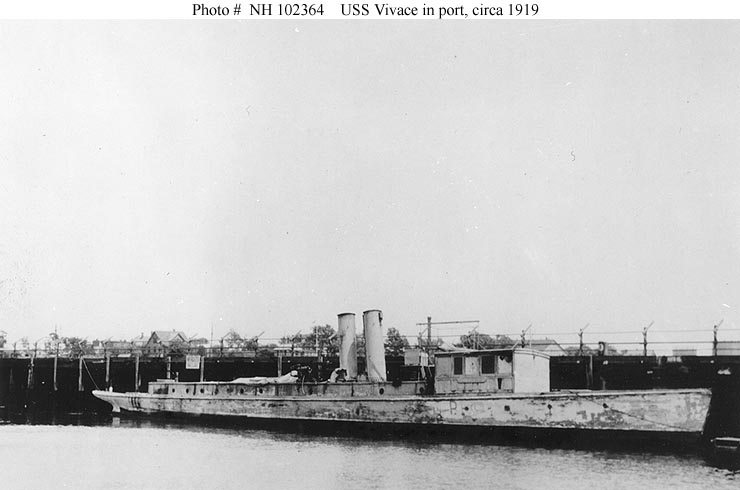
USS Vivace (SP-583), probably while laid up and awaiting disposal in late 1918 or early 1919.

USS Vivace (SP-583) was a United States Navy patrol vessel in commission from 1917 to 1918.

Vivace was built as the fast private steam yacht Vixen by the Charles L. Seabury Company and the Gas Engine and Power Company at Morris Heights in the Bronx, New York, in 1904 to a design by the naval architect Charles L. Seabury. She later was renamed Vivace.

Vivace was the property of the two companies that built her when, on 18 June 1917, the U.S. Navy enrolled her in the Naval Coast Defense Reserve and ordered her delivered for Navy use as a section patrol vessel during World War I. Her owners delivered her to the Navy on 29 June 1917, and she was commissioned as USS Vivace (SP-583) on 20 September 1917.

Assigned to the 3rd Naval District, Vivace carried out patrol duties in the New York City area for a year.

Apparently difficult to maintain, Vivace was decommissioned and simultaneously stricken from the Navy List on 28 September 1918, six and a half weeks before the end of the war. She was sold as "junk" to Marvin Briggs, Inc., of Brooklyn, New York, on 16 April 1919.
