= USS Vergana =

Patrol vessel of the United States Navy

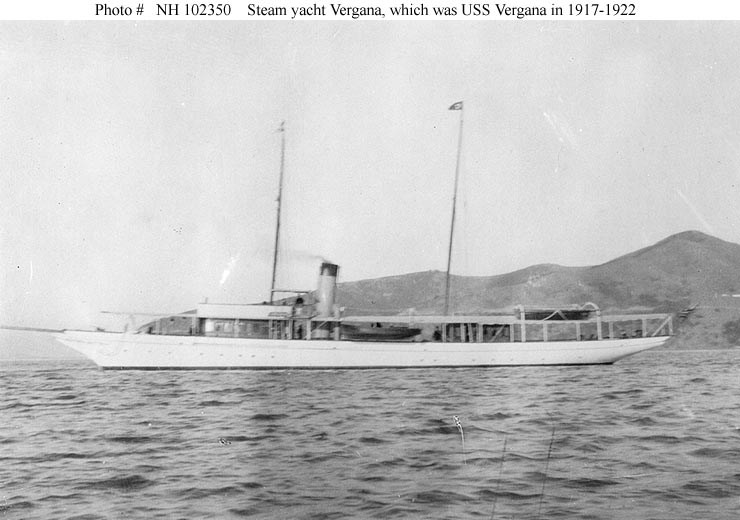
- Vergana as a private yacht sometime between 1897 and 1917.

History

United States
- Name: USS Vergana
- Namesake: Previous name retained
- Builder: T. S. Marvel, Newburgh, New York
- Completed: 1897
- Acquired: Spring 1917
- Commissioned: 10 July 1917
- Maiden voyage: 16 January 1919
- Reclassified: "Old district patrol craft," OYP-519, 17 July 1920
- Fate: Sold 25 February 1922
- Notes: Operated as private yacht Vergana 1897-1917

General characteristics
- Type: Patrol vessel
- Tonnage: 128 gross register tons
- Length: 145 ft (44 m)
- Beam: 17 ft 4 in (5.28 m)
- Draft: 8 ft 6 in (2.59 m)
- Depth: 9 ft 4 in (2.84 m)
- Propulsion: Steam engine and sails
- Sail plan: Schooner-rigged
- Speed: 12 knots
- Complement: 19
- Armament: 2 × 1-pounder guns

USS Vergana (SP-519), later OYP-519, was a United States Navy patrol vessel in commission from 1917 to 1919.

Vergana was built in 1897 as a private steel-hulled, schooner-rigged steam yacht of the same name by T. S. Marvel at Newburgh, New York, for F. S. Flower of New York City. Flower later sold her to Wilbert Melville of Los Angeles, California, who in turn sold her to stationer and printer Charles H. Crocker in either late 1916 or early 1917. By the time the United States entered World War I on 6 April 1917, she was registered at San Francisco, California, and home-ported at Belvedere Cove, California.

The U.S. Navy acquired Vergana from Crcoker in the spring of 1917 for use as a section patrol vessel during World War I. The date of her acquisition and delivery to the Navy are unclear; according to her logbook, her first commanding officer, Ensign E. Dahlgren, USNRF, reported aboard on 16 April 1917, but some sources state that she was not delivered to the Navy until 4 May 1917. She was commissioned as USS Vergana (SP-519) on 10 July 1917.

Vergana performed harbor entrance patrol duty at San Francisco almost continually for the duration of World War I. She alternated on duty with the U.S. Navy patrol vessels USS Sentinel (SP-180) and USS SP-647 (ex-USS California), and the tug USS Golden Gate both underway at the mouth of San Francisco Bay and stationary at guard duty beside a pier.

Decommissioned at the Mare Island Navy Yard at Vallejo, California, on 16 January 1919, Vergana apparently remained in reserve thereafter. When the U.S. Navy adopted its modern hull number system on 17 July 1920, she was classified as an "old district patrol craft" and redesignated OYP-519.

Vergana was ordered sold on 30 September 1921. An initial sale, of that date, was never consummated, but on 25 February 1922 she was sold to Louis A. Fracchia of Oakland, California.
