= USS Tisdale =

USS Tisdale has been the name of more than one United States Navy ship, and may refer to:

- USS Tisdale (DE-278), a destroyer escort transferred to the United Kingdom in 1943 upon completion which served in the Royal Navy as the frigate HMS Keats (K482) from 1943 to 1946
- USS Tisdale (DE-33), a destroyer escort in commission from 1943 to 1945

== See also ==
- USS Mahlon S. Tisdale, a guided missile frigate in commission from 1982 to 1996
