= USS Valeda =

Patrol vessel of the United States Navy

History

United States
- Name: USS Valeda
- Namesake: Previous name retained
- Builder: Stamford Motor Company, Stamford, Connecticut
- Completed: 1908
- Acquired: 9 July 1917
- Commissioned: 12 July 1917
- Decommissioned: 4 February 1919
- Stricken: 1 October 1919
- Fate: Sold 2 January 1920
- Notes: Operated as private motorboat Valeda 1908-1917

General characteristics
- Type: Patrol vessel
- Tonnage: 19 gross register tons
- Length: 59 ft 5 in (18.11 m)
- Beam: 12 ft 6 in (3.81 m)
- Draft: 4 ft 2 in (1.27 m) mean
- Speed: 10.5 knots
- Complement: 10
- Armament: 1 × 1-pounder gun; 1 × .30-caliber (7.62-mm) machine gun

USS Valeda (SP-592) was a United States Navy patrol vessel in commission from 1917 to 1919.

Valeda was built as a wooden-hulled private cabin motor launch of the same name by the Stamford Motor Company at Stamford, Connecticut, in 1908. On 9 July 1917, the U.S. Navy acquired her from her owner, F.B. Richards of Cleveland, Ohio, for use as a section patrol boat during World War I. She was commissioned as USS Valeda (SP-592) on 12 July 1917 at Rockland, Maine.

Assigned to the Rockland Section in the 1st Naval District in northern New England, Valeda carried out harbor and harbor entrance patrol duties at Rockland for the rest of World War I and into early 1919.

Valeda was decommissioned at Baker's Yacht Basin at Quincy, Massachusetts, on 4 February 1919, stricken from the Navy List on 1 October 1919, and sold to J. R. C. McBeath of Atlantic, Massachusetts, on 2 January 1920.
