= USS Teaser =

USS Teaser has been the name of more than one United States Navy ship, and may refer to:

- USS Teaser (1861), a steamer in commission from 1862 to 1865
- USS Teaser (SP-933), a patrol boat commissioned in 1917 and sunk in 1918
