= USS Tanguingui =

Patrol vessel of the United States Navy

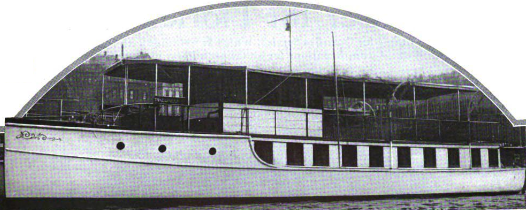
- USS Tanguingui as a private vessel in 1916, prior to being leased by the U.S. Navy

History

United States
- Name: USS Tanguingui
- Namesake: Previous name retained
- Builder: New York Yacht Launch and Engine Company, Morris Heights, New York
- Completed: 1915
- Acquired: 28 June 1917
- Commissioned: 31 October 1917
- Out of service: 6 February 1919
- Stricken: 7 April 1919
- Fate: Returned to owner 21 April 1919
- Notes: Operated as private yacht Tanguingui 1915-1917 and from 1919

General characteristics
- Type: Patrol vessel
- Tonnage: 51 tons
- Length: 63 ft 6 in (19.35 m)
- Beam: 15 ft 10 in (4.83 m)
- Draft: 3 ft 8 in (1.12 m) (aft)
- Speed: 12 miles per hour (10 kn)
- Complement: 8
- Armament: 1 × 1-pounder gun (removed 6 February 1919)

USS Tanguingui (SP-126) was an armed motor yacht that served in the United States Navy as a patrol vessel from 1917 to 1919.

Tanguingui was built as a civilian yacht in 1915 by the New York Yacht Launch and Engine Company at Morris Heights, New York. The U.S. Navy acquired Tanguingui under a free lease from her owner, Mr. J. C. McCoy of New York City, on 28 June 1917 for use as a patrol boat during World War I. She was commissioned on 31 October 1917 as USS Tanguingui (SP-126).

Assigned to the 7th Naval District, Tanguingui operated out of Key West, Florida, patrolling along the extreme southern coast of Florida to prevent incursions by German submarines. Following the Armistice with Germany that ended the war on 11 November 1918, she continued to serve the Navy until her main battery, small arms, and ammunition were removed on 6 February 1919.

Tanguingui's name was stricken from the Navy List on 7 April 1919, and she was returned to her owner on 21 April 1919.
