= USS Trumpeter =

The following ships of the United States Navy can be referred to as USS Trumpeter;

- USS Trumpeter (DE-180), a Cannon-class destroyer escort in service from 1943 to 1947.
- USS Trumpeter (DE-279), an Evarts-class destroyer escort transferred to the United Kingdom under Lend Lease and renamed HMS Kempthorne as part of the Captain-class frigates. The ship served from 1943 to 1945 in the Royal Navy before being returned to the US and scrapped in 1946.
