= USS Tallahoma =

Gunboat of the United States Navy

History
- Name: Tallahoma
- Builder: Brooklyn Navy Yard
- Launched: 28 Nov 1863
- Acquired: 27 Dec 1865
- Commissioned: Never
- Renamed: Mary M. Roberts (1868)
- Fate: Sold by Navy, 29 August 1868; disappears from shipping registers after 1870

General characteristics
- Class & type: Sassacus-class gunboat

Tallahoma—a wooden-hulled, sidewheel, "double-ended" gunboat of the Sassacus class—was constructed at the New York Navy Yard and launched on 28 November 1862. However, since her construction was not completed until 1867—when the Civil War which had prompted her construction had ended—the ship saw no service. After a brief period in ordinary at New York, the ship was sold on 29 August 1868.

Documented as Mary M. Roberts on 10 November 1868, the erstwhile gunboat was converted to a barge on 21 December 1870, and she disappeared from the lists of merchant vessels.
