= USS Victor =

USS Victor is a name used more than once by the U.S. Navy:

- USS Victor (SP-1995), a wooden-hulled motorboat constructed at Camden, New Jersey, by Clement A. Troth, and completed in 1917.
- USS Victor (AMc-109), a coastal minesweeper laid down in 1941.
