= USS Victoria =

USS Victoria is a name used more than once by the U.S. Navy:

- USS Victoria (1855), a Civil War gunboat serving in the North Atlantic Blockading Squadron. She was built in 1855, purchased by the Navy in 1861, decommissioned in 1865, and dropped from documentation in 1871.
- USS Victoria (AO-46) built in 1917 as the steel-hulled, single-screw tanker George G. Henry. She was chartered by the Navy and commissioned in 1918. In 1942 she was renamed, erroneously Victor, then Victoria, after the Victoria River of Australia. She was decommissioned in 1945, and stricken from the Naval Vessel Register in 1946.
- USNS Victoria (T-AK-281) was launched as the "Victory Ship" Ethiopia Victory in 1944. She was one of four Victory Ships transferred from the Maritime Administration to the Navy for conversion to fleet ballistic missile (FBM) resupply cargo ships. Transferred in 1964, she was renamed for Victoria, Texas in 1965. She was stricken in 1986.
