= USS Unicorn =

Two submarines of the United States Navy have borne the name USS Unicorn, for the narwhal, an Arctic marine cetacean with a single tusk suggesting the horn of a unicorn. Both were Tench-class submarines, and neither were commissioned.

- USS Unicorn (SS-429) was cancelled before construction began in 1944.
- USS Unicorn (SS-436) was laid down less than a year later and launched, but never commissioned.
