= USS Vigor =

USS Vigor is a name used more than once by the United States Navy:

- USS Vigor (AMc-110), a minesweeper laid down on 6 August 1941.
- USS Vigor (AM-473), a minesweeper laid down on 16 June 1952 at Manitowoc, Wisconsin.
