= USS Tatoosh (YAG-1) =

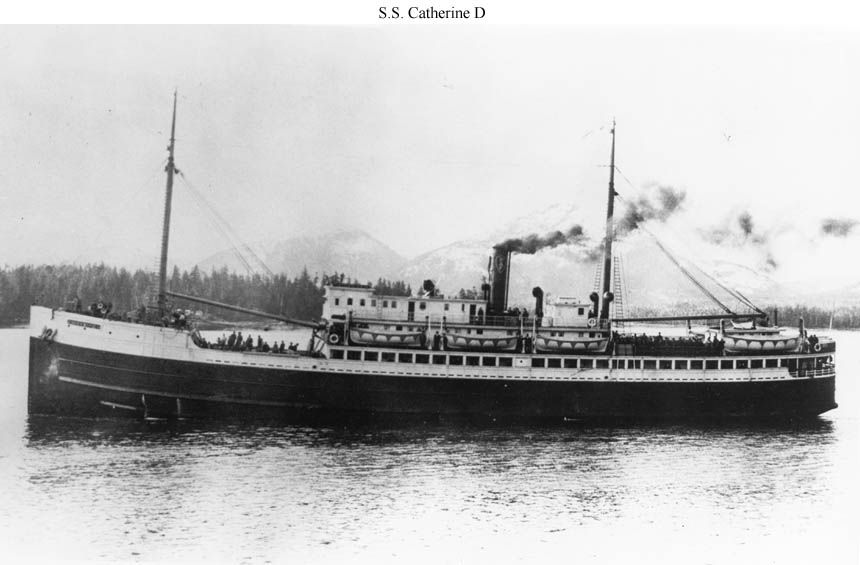
- SS Catherine D. underway in Alaskan waters.

History

United States
- Name: Catherine D.
- Owner: Pacific American Fisheries Inc.
- Builder: Pacific American Fisheries Inc., Bellingham, Washington
- Launched: 27 February 1918
- Completed: November 1918
- Fate: Delivered to Navy at Port Winslow, Washington, 9 March 1941
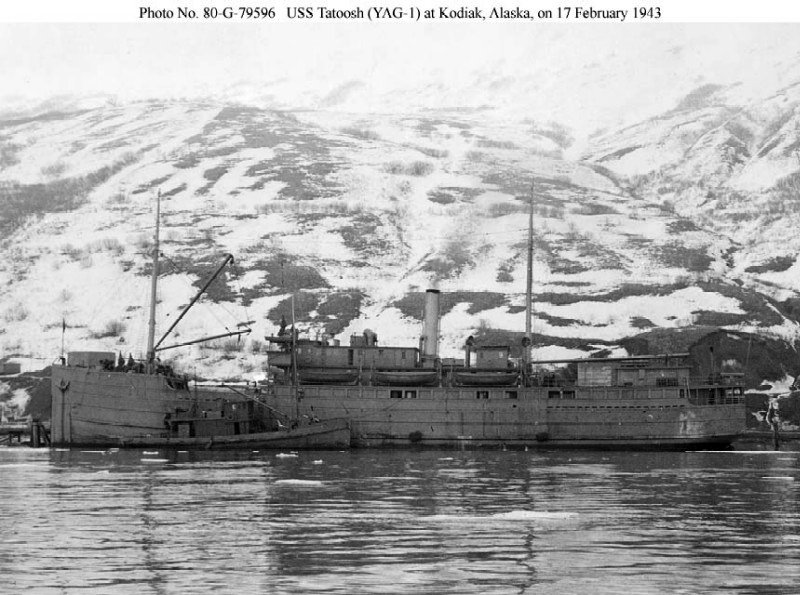
- USS Tatoosh (YAG-1,) moored pierside, at Kodiak, Alaska, 17 February 1943.

History

United States
- Name: Tatoosh
- Namesake: Tatoosh Island, Washington
- Acquired: 2 March 1941
- Commissioned: 17 June 1941
- Decommissioned: 1 December 1944
- Renamed: Tatoosh, 10 April 1941
- Stricken: 11 December 1944
- Identification: Hull symbol:YAG-1; Code letters:NABM
- Fate: Scuttled, 29 September 1945

General characteristics
- Tonnage: 2,224 GRT
- Length: 243 ft 4 in (74.17 m)
- Beam: 42 ft (13 m)
- Draft: 21 ft (6.4 m)
- Installed power: 1 × Water-tube boiler; 1,000 ihp (750 kW)
- Propulsion: 2 × 3-cylinder triple expansion steam engines; 2 × screws
- Complement: 98
- Armament: 4 × .5 in (13 mm) caliber machine guns; 2 × .3 in (7.6 mm) caliber machine guns

USS Tatoosh (YAG-1) was a wooden-hulled cargo-passenger vessel, SS Catherine D., that was acquired by the U.S. Navy.

SS Catherine D., a wooden-hulled steamship built in 1918 at Bellingham, Washington, by Pacific American Fisheries, Inc., was purchased by the Navy on 27 March 1941; renamed Tatoosh (YAG-1) on 10 April 1941; placed in reduced commission on 25 April 1941; was converted to a mobile section base by the Puget Sound Navy Yard; and placed in full commission on 17 June 1941.

== World War II service ==
Tatoosh was assigned to the 13th Naval District. Though records of her actual locations do not appear to exist, Tatoosh may well have been assigned to Alaskan waters soon after her commissioning. At any rate, she was reassigned to the 17th Naval District on 15 April 1944, the day upon which the Alaskan part of the 13th Naval District was officially reconstituted as the 17th Naval District. The ship served in the new naval district for the remainder of her career.

== Decommissioning and fate ==
A survey board inspected the vessel in August 1944, and she was decommissioned on 1 December 1944. Her name was struck from the Navy list on 11 December 1944, and her hulk was destroyed on 29 September 1945.
