= USNS Thomas G. Thompson =

USNS Thomas G. Thompson may refer to

- USNS Thomas G. Thompson (T-AGOR-9), was an oceanographic research ship launched on 18 July 1964 and renamed RV Pacific Escort (II) (IX-517) and later as R/V Gosport (IX-517)
- USNS Thomas G. Thompson (T-AGOR-23), is an oceanographic research ship launched on 27 July 1990 and later renamed RV Thomas G. Thompson (T-AGOR-23)
