= USS Vileehi =

History

United States
- Builder: San Diego Marine Construction Company
- Launched: 1930
- Acquired: 23 December 1941
- In service: 26 February 1942
- Out of service: 20 September 1945
- Stricken: 24 October 1945
- Fate: Returned to owner 27 September 1945, sunk 2019

General characteristics
- Displacement: 54 tons
- Length: 80 ft (24 m)
- Beam: 19 ft 3 in (5.87 m)
- Draft: 11 ft 5 in (3.48 m)
- Speed: 7 knots

The USS Vileehi a wooden-hulled ketch with an auxiliary engine was designed by Edson B. Schock and built in 1930 at San Diego, California by the San Diego Marine Construction Company. The vessel was acquired by the Navy from Hiram T. Horton of San Diego on 23 December 1941.

Assigned to the 11th Naval District on 17 February 1942, Vileehi was given the designation IX-62 and placed in service on 26 February. She operated locally out of San Diego for the remainder of World War II and was placed out of service on 20 September 1945. Returned to her owner on 27 September, Vileehi was struck from the Naval Vessel Register on 24 October 1945.

Under the British flag colors, London's port, the boat with a new Owner it's moored in Sardinia ( Italy ), Mediterranean Sea, well maintenanced and restored.

Unfortunately the Vileehi sunk in December 2019 in the harbour of Port Napoleon, Port Saint Louis du Rhone, France.
