= USS Trefoil =

USS Trefoil has been the name of two ships of the United States Navy.

- USS Trefoil (1865), a wooden-hulled screw steamboat purchased by the Navy and used for approximately six months
- USS Trefoil (IX-149), the lead ship of the Trefoil-class concrete barges
