= USS Tarantula =

Two ships of the United States Navy have been named USS Tarantula, a name applied to Italy's wolf spider, to some Asiatic spiders, and to various species of large, dark, hairy spiders found in the warmer climes of the Americas.

- The first USS Tarantula (SS-12) was a B-class submarine renamed B-3.
- The second USS Tarantula (SP-124) was a motor yacht acquired by the Navy for service during World War I.
