= USS Urdaneta =

Gunboat of the United States Navy

History

United States
- Name: USS Urdaneta
- Builder: Cavite Arsenal
- Laid down: 1882
- Launched: 1883
- Acquired: by capture, 1898
- Commissioned: 17 January 1899
- Decommissioned: 12 December 1902
- Stricken: 15 December 1904
- Fate: Unknown

General characteristics
- Type: Gunboat
- Displacement: 42 long tons (43 t)
- Length: 70 ft 5 in (21.46 m) p/p
- Beam: 12 ft 3 in (3.73 m)
- Draft: 4 ft 9 in (1.45 m)
- Speed: 8 knots (15 km/h; 9.2 mph)
- Complement: 15
- Armament: 1 × 1-pounder gun; 1 × 37 mm gun; 1 × Colt machine gun

USS Urdaneta – occasionally misspelled Undaneta – was an iron-hulled gunboat in the United States Navy. She was named for Spanish friar and explorer Andres de Urdaneta.

Urdaneta was built for the Spanish government at the Cavite Arsenal near Manila, Philippines, in 1882 and 1883 and was apparently captured by the United States Army during the Spanish–American War in 1898. Acquired from the War Department by the Navy on 17 January 1899, Urdaneta went into commission on 2 June 1899.

== Service history ==
The gunboat conducted local patrols into the summer months to interdict the flow of munitions and arms to the opposition during the Philippine–American War. On 17 September 1899, Urdaneta ran aground in the Orani River, near Manila, on a soft mud shoal. Insurrectionists along the river soon opened a withering enfilading fire, killing the gunboat's commanding officer, Naval Cadet Welborn C. Wood, and some of his crew.

Urdaneta resumed her service in the spring of the following year, being commissioned at Cavite on 12 May 1900. She departed Cavite on the 14th and served for a time as guard ship at Olongapo before shifting to Subic, and eventually, to Cavite, where she spent the remainder of May undergoing repairs and alterations.

Urdaneta subsequently operated as guard vessel at Subic Bay and conducted surveys in connection with the impending visits of the commission investigating naval base sites in the Philippines. She remained engaged in these vital but unglamourous duties until she was decommissioned on 12 December 1902 at Cavite. Struck from the Navy list on 15 December 1904, Urdaneta was apparently reinstated on the Navy list as a tug, although there is no extant record of this event. The ship is listed in Ship's Data, United States Naval Vessels editions for 1912 through 1916 as a yard tug operating at Cavite. Her subsequent fate is unknown.
