= USS Virginian (1904) =

Tugboat of the United States Navy

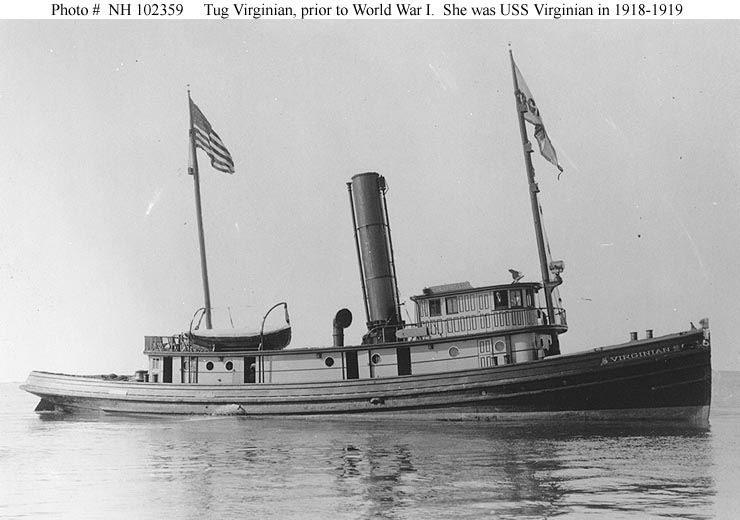
- SS Virginian prior to her U.S. Navy service.

History

United States
- Name: USS Virginian
- Namesake: Previous name retained
- Completed: 1904
- Acquired: Probably late 1917
- Commissioned: Probably early 1918
- Stricken: 12 May 1919
- Fate: Returned to owner 12 May 1919
- Notes: Served as commercial tug SS Blue Bell or SS Blue Belle and SS Virginian 1904-1917 and as SS Virginian from 1919

General characteristics
- Type: Cargo ship
- Tonnage: 179 register tons
- Length: 90 ft 0 in (27.43 m)
- Beam: 21 ft 0 in (6.40 m)
- Draft: 7 ft 9 in (2.36 m) (mean)
- Propulsion: Steam engine
- Speed: 8 knots
- Complement: 15

USS Virginian was a United States Navy tug in commission from 1918 to 1919.

Virginian was built as the commercial tug Blue Bell or Blue Belle in 1904 at Camden, New Jersey. She subsequently was renamed SS Virginian. The U.S. Navy acquired her for World War I service from her owner, the Southern Transportation Company, at Philadelphia, Pennsylvania probably sometime in late 1917. The Navy apparently commissioned her sometime in early 1918 as USS Virginian.

Virginian served as a tug in the 5th Naval District—probably at Norfolk, Virginia, through the end of World War I and into the early months of 1919.

On 12 May 1919, Virginian was returned to the Southern Transportation Company and her name was stricken from the Navy List.

Unlike most commercial ships commissioned into U.S. Navy service during World War I, Virginian never received a naval registry Identification Number (Id. No.).
