= USS Tomahawk =

USS Tomahawk is a name used more than once by the U.S. Navy:

- USS Tomahawk (AO-88) laid down under Maritime Commission contract (MC hull 1267) on 1 June 1943.
- Tomahawk (YTB-789) laid down in January 1966 at Marinette, Wisconsin.
