= USS Tamarack =

Patrol vessel of the United States Navy

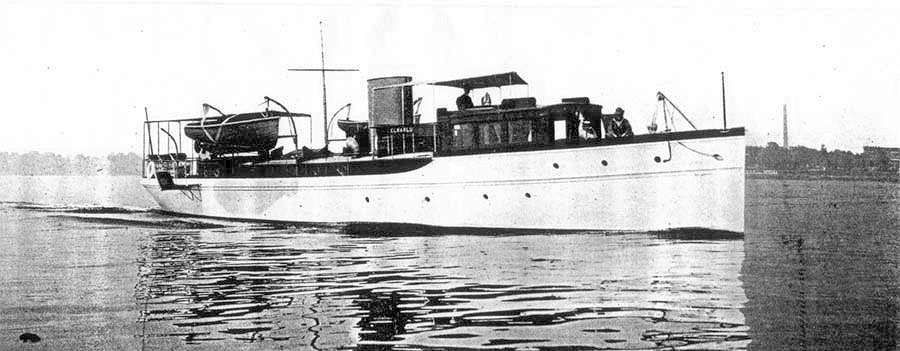
- Tamarack as a private motor yacht sometime between 1915 and 1917.

History

United States
- Name: USS Tamarack
- Namesake: Previous name retained (Tamarack)
- Builder: Nevins Shipyard, City Island, The Bronx, New York
- Completed: 1915
- Acquired: 25 June 1917
- Commissioned: 18 September 1917
- Stricken: 21 February 1919
- Fate: Returned to owner 21 February 1919
- Notes: Operated as civilian motor yacht Tamarack 1915-1917 and as Tamarack, later Elmarlu, from 1919

General characteristics
- Type: Patrol vessel
- Tonnage: 27 or 47 gross register tons
- Length: 80 ft (24 m)
- Beam: 13 ft 3 in (4.04 m)
- Draft: 4 ft 5 in (1.35 m) mean
- Speed: 14 miles per hour (12 kn)
- Armament: 2 × 1-pounder guns

USS Tamarack (SP-561) was a United States Navy patrol vessel in commission from 1917 to 1919.

Tamarack was built as a private motor yacht of the same name by Nevins Shipyard at City Island in the Bronx, New York, in 1915 to a design by the firm of Swasey, Raymond, and Page. On 25 June 1917, the U.S. Navy acquired her under a free lease from her owner, Leonard Breed of Flushing, New York, for use as a section patrol craft during World War I. She was commissioned as USS Tamarack (SP-561) on 18 September 1917.

Assigned to the 3rd Naval District, Tamarack served on patrol duties along the coasts of Connecticut, New York, and New Jersey for the rest of World War I and into early 1919.

Tamarack was returned to Beard on 21 February 1919 and stricken from the Navy List the same day. She returned to civilian service, and later was renamed Elmarlu.
