= USS Tramp =

Patrol vessel of the United States Navy

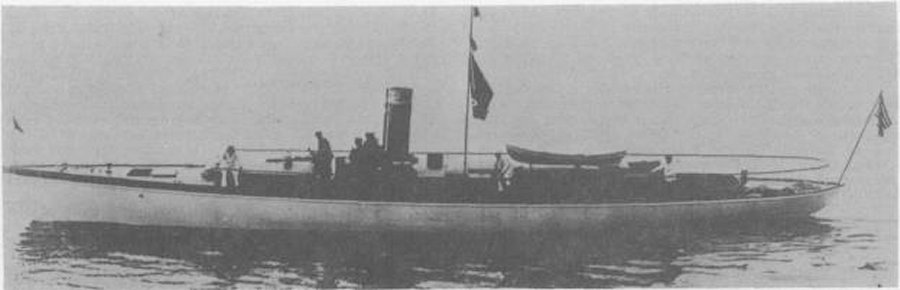
- Tramp as a private yacht sometime between 1901 and 1917.

History

United States
- Name: USS Tramp
- Namesake: Previous name retained
- Builder: Herreshoff Manufacturing Company, Bristol, Rhode Island
- Completed: 1901
- Acquired: 13 July 1917
- Commissioned: 1917
- Fate: Sold 28 March 1919
- Notes: Operated as private yacht Tramp 1901–1917

General characteristics
- Type: Patrol vessel
- Tonnage: 27 gross register tons
- Length: 82 ft (25 m)
- Beam: 10 ft 6 in (3.20 m)
- Draft: 2 ft 8 in (0.81 m) mean
- Propulsion: Steam engine
- Speed: 20 knots
- Complement: 10
- Armament: None

USS Tramp (SP-646) was a United States Navy patrol vessel in commission from 1917 to 1919.

Tramp was built as a private wooden-hulled steam yacht of the same name by the Herreshoff Manufacturing Company at Bristol, Rhode Island, in 1901. On 13 July 1917, the U.S. Navy acquired her from her owner, Raymond B. Price of New York City, for use as a section patrol boat during World War I. She was commissioned as USS Tramp (SP-646) in 1917.

Assigned to the 2nd Naval District in southern New England, Tramp performed patrol duties for the rest of World War I.

Tramp was sold to Butler and Company of Boston, Massachusetts, on 28 March 1919.
