= USS T-1 =

Ship name

USS T-1 has been the name of more than one United States Navy ship, and may refer to:

- USS T-1 (SS-52), later SF-1, a fleet submarine in commission from 1920 to 1922
- USS T-1 (SST-1, ex-AGSS-570), a training submarine in commission from 1953 to 1973, renamed USS Mackerel (SST-1) in 1956
