= USS Vincent =

Patrol vessel of the United States Navy

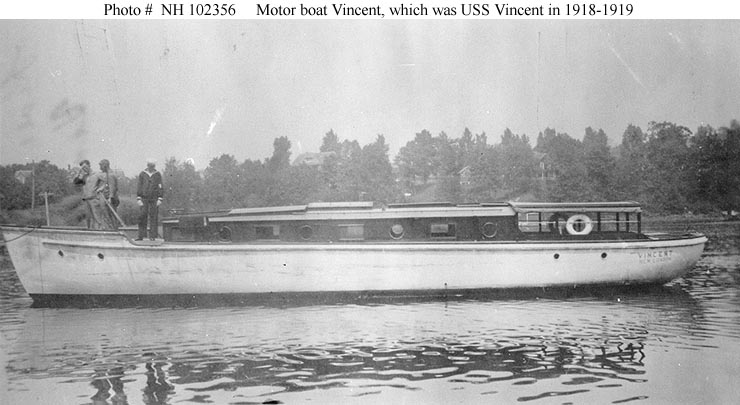
- Vincent as a private motorboat. The presence of three United States Navy sailors on her deck suggests that the photograph was taken at the time of her inspection for possible naval service in 1917 or 1918.

History

United States
- Name: USS Vincent
- Namesake: Previous name retained
- Builder: Britt Brothers, Lynn, Massachusetts
- Completed: 1909
- Acquired: 1917 or 1918
- Commissioned: 28 June 1917, 20 June 1918, or 28 June 1918.
- Stricken: 28 June 1919
- Fate: Returned to owner 28 June 1919
- Notes: Operated as civilian motorboat Vincent from 1909 to 1917 or 1918 and from 1919

General characteristics
- Type: Patrol vessel
- Tonnage: 17 Gross register tons
- Length: 49 ft 0 in (14.94 m)
- Beam: 10 ft 7 in (3.23 m)
- Draft: 2 ft 10 in (0.86 m)
- Propulsion: Internal combustion engine, one shaft
- Speed: 9.0 knots
- Complement: 4
- Armament: None

USS Vincent (SP-3246) was a United States Navy patrol vessel in commission from 1917 or 1918 to 1919.

== Background ==
Vincent was built as a civilian wooden single-screw cabin motorboat of the same name in 1909 by Britt Brothers at Lynn, Massachusetts. The U.S. Navy acquired her under a free lease from her owner, the Transfer Company of Norwich, Connecticut, for use as a section patrol boat during World War I; sources differ on the date of the acquisition, suggesting that it could have happened in both June 1917 and June 1918. She was commissioned as USS Vincent (SP-3246); sources disagree on her commissioning date, stating that it was 28 June 1917, 20 June 1918, and 28 June 1918

Vincent was assigned to the 3rd Naval District. No deck logs have been found describing her service there, but she presumably performed patrol duties at least through the end of World War I.

The Navy returned Vincent to the Transfer Company on 28 June 1919 and she was stricken from the Navy List the same day.
