= USS Thistle =

USS Thistle has been the name of more than one United States Navy ship, and may refer to:

- USS Thistle (1862), a steamer in commission from 1862 to 1865
- USS Thistle (SP-1058), a patrol boat in commission from 1917 to 1918
