= USS Union =

USS Union has been the name of more than one ship in the United States Navy, and may refer to:

- USS Union (1841), an experimental steamer in commission from 1843 to 1847
- USS Union (1846), a schooner captured from Mexico in November 1846 and wrecked in December 1846
- USS Union (1861), an armed screw steamer in commission in 1861 and from 1863 to 1865
- USS Union (AKA-106), an attack cargo ship in commission from 1945 to 1970
