= USS Theta =

Tugboat of the United States Navy

History

United States
- Acquired: 9 December 1864
- Fate: Sold, 1865

General characteristics
- Propulsion: steam engine; screw-propelled

USS Theta was a steamer purchased by the Union Navy during the latter years of the American Civil War.

Theta was acquired by the Admiral David Dixon Porter, but records of her service are sparse. Since she was a tugboat, she probably served that function, as required, at Norfolk, Virginia.

== Service history ==
John T. Jenkins, a screw tug, was purchased for the Navy by Rear Admiral David Dixon Porter on 9 December 1864 at Norfolk, Virginia, and renamed Theta. Acquired late in the Civil War, Theta probably saw little or no service. There are no records of any deck logs for her, and she is mentioned but once in the "Official Records of the Union and Confederate Navies in the War of the Rebellion"—with reference to her purchase. Her service—if she served at all—was brief and probably consisted of some variety of yard tug duty at Norfolk. She was sold late in 1865—one source indicates that the sale occurred on 17 August 1865—but that transaction remains undocumented. In any event, her name had disappeared from the "List of Vessels of the United States Navy" by 20 January 1866 when the 1866 Navy Register was issued.
