= USS Taurus =

USS Taurus is a name used more than once by the U.S. Navy, after the constellation Taurus:

- USS Taurus (AF-25), originally SS San Benito, was a cargo ship which was acquired and commissioned by the Navy in 1942. She was struck in 1946.
- USNS Taurus (T-AK-273) was laid down as Fort Snelling (LSD-23) in 1944. The unchristened hull changed hands twice before being completed in 1956 as the roll-on/roll-off ship SS Carib Queen. In 1958 the Maritime Administration took over the vessel. She was assigned to MSTS in 1959, and renamed Taurus. Never commissioned, Taurus went out of service in 1968. Her name was struck from the Naval Vessel Register in 1971.
- USS Taurus (PHM-3) was a hydrofoil-type ship launched in 1981 and struck in 1993.
