= USS Trieste =

There have been two US Navy ships called Trieste:

- (DSV-0) Bathyscaphe Trieste
- (DSV-1) Bathyscaphe Trieste II

There was also reference to a starship USS Trieste on Star Trek: The Next Generation.
