= USS Tern (SP-871) =

Patrol vessel of the United States Navy

History

United States
- Name: USS Tern (1917-1918); USS SP-871 (1918)
- Namesake: Tern was her previous name retained; SP-871 was her section patrol number
- Builder: Murray and Tregurtha, South Boston, Massachusetts
- Completed: 1907
- Acquired: 28 May 1917
- Commissioned: 28 May 1917
- Renamed: SP-871 in 1918
- Fate: Returned to owner 21 November 1918
- Notes: Operated as private motorboat Tern 1907-1917 and from 1919

General characteristics
- Type: Patrol vessel
- Tonnage: 17 or 18 Gross register tons
- Length: 53 ft (16 m)
- Beam: 10 ft (3.0 m)
- Draft: 2 ft 9 in (0.84 m)
- Armament: 1 × 1-pounder gun; 1 × machine gun

The first USS Tern (SP-871) was a United States Navy patrol vessel in commission from 1917 to 1918.

Tern was built as a private motorboat of the same name in 1907 by Murray and Tregurtha at South Boston, Massachusetts. On 28 May 1917, the U.S. Navy acquired her from her owner, E. F. Nail of Atlantic City, New Jersey, for use as a section patrol boat during World War I. She was commissioned the same day as USS Tern (SP-871).

Assigned to the 4th Naval District, Tern operated on patrol duty for the rest of World War I. She was renamed USS SP-871 in 1918, presumably to avoid confusion with the new minesweeper USS Tern (Minesweeper No. 31), then under construction.

SP-871 was returned to Nail on 21 November 1918.
