= USS Tangier (SP-469) =

Patrol vessel of the United States Navy

History

United States
- Name: USS Tangier
- Namesake: Previous name retained
- Builder: J. Woodtull, Orvington, Virginia
- Acquired: 1917
- Commissioned: 24 April 1917
- Fate: Returned to owner 22 October 1918
- Notes: Operated as private motor yacht Tangier before April 1917 and from October 1918

General characteristics
- Type: Patrol vessel
- Tonnage: 7 gross register tons
- Length: 62 ft 0 in (18.90 m)
- Beam: 13 ft 6 in (4.11 m)
- Draft: 2 ft 4 in (0.71 m) mean
- Speed: 14 knots
- Armament: 1 × 1-pounder gun

The first USS Tangier (SP-469) was a United States Navy patrol vessel in commission from 1917 to 1918.

Tangier was built as a private motor yacht of the same name by J. Woodtull at Orvington, Virginia. In 1917, the U.S. Navy acquired her from her owner, Mr. J. S. Parsons of Norfolk, Virginia, for use as a section patrol vessel during World War I. She was commissioned as USS Tangier (SP-469) on 24 April 1917.

Little is known of Tangier's operational history. She probably carried out patrol duties in the waters near Norfolk and in the lower reaches of the Chesapeake Bay.

Tangier was returned to her owner on 22 October 1918.
