= USS Tuscumbia =

USS Tuscumbia is a name used more than once by the U.S. Navy:

- USS Tuscumbia (1862), a gunboat in the United States Navy during the American Civil War.
- Tuscumbia (YTB-762), a tugboat launched in November 1945.
