= USS Traveler (SP-122) =

US Navy patrol vessel

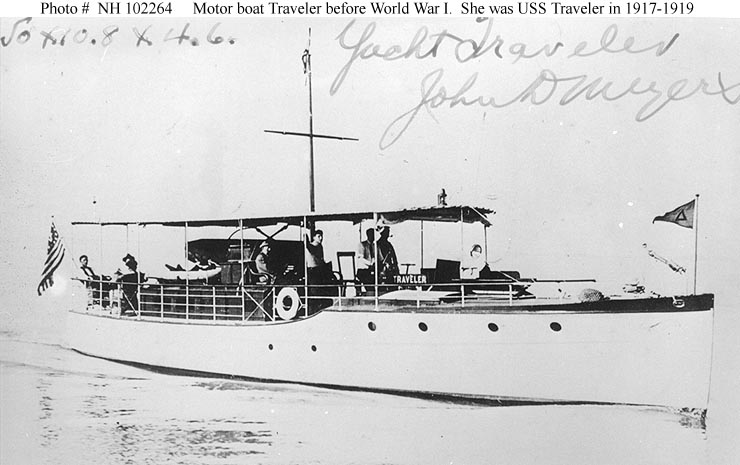
- Traveler as a civilian motorboat prior to her U.S. Navy service.

History

United States
- Name: USS Traveler
- Namesake: Previous name retained
- Builder: Mathews Boat Company, Port Clinton, Ohio
- Completed: 1914
- Acquired: 5 May 1917
- Commissioned: 14 July 1917
- Stricken: 4 October 1919
- Fate: Wrecked 9 September 1919
- Notes: Operated as private motorboat Traveler 1914-1917

General characteristics
- Type: Patrol vessel
- Tonnage: 18 tons
- Length: 50 ft 3 in (15.32 m)
- Beam: 10 ft 8 in (3.25 m)
- Draft: 4 ft 6 in (1.37 m) (aft)
- Speed: 10 miles per hour
- Complement: 6
- Armament: 1 × 1-pounder gun; 1 × machine gun

USS Traveler (SP-122) was an armed motorboat that served in the United States Navy as a patrol vessel from 1917 to 1919.

Traveler was built as a civilian motorboat in 1914 by the Mathews Boat Company at Port Clinton, Ohio. The U.S. Navy acquired Traveler from her owner, Mr. John D. Meyers of Miami, Florida, on 5 May 1917 for use as a patrol boat during World War I. She was commissioned on 14 July 1917 as USS Traveler (SP-122).

Assigned to the 7th Naval District, Traveler was based at Key West, Florida, from which she conducted patrols to protect American coastal trade routes from German submarine and naval mining incursions. Following the Armistice with Germany that ended the war on 11 November 1918, she continued to serve at Key West.

On 9 September 1919, Traveler and seven other section patrol boats anchored in the North Beach Basin at Key West were completely destroyed by a hurricane. The wreckage of the eight boats was hauled out immediately following the storm and burned.

Traveler's name was stricken from the Navy List on 4 October 1919.
