= USS Viking (SP-3314) =

Patrol vessel of the United States Navy

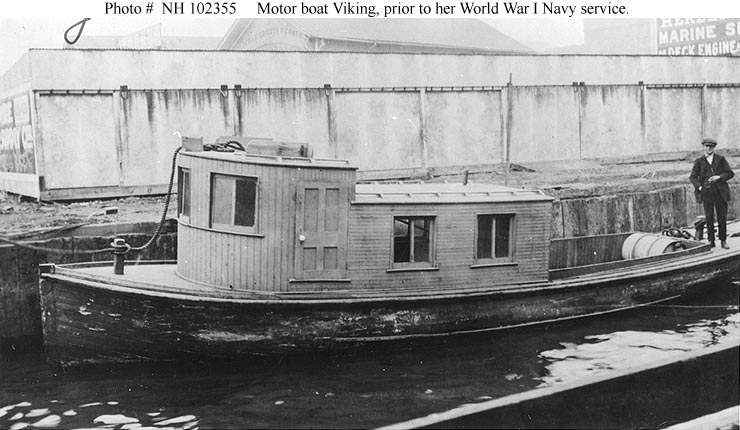
- Viking as a civilian motorboat sometime between 1915 and 1918, probably at Norfolk, Virginia.

History

United States
- Name: USS Viking
- Namesake: Previous name retained
- Builder: United States Navy
- Completed: 1915
- Acquired: 24 September 1918
- Stricken: 19 February 1919
- Fate: Sold as junk 20 February 1919
- Notes: Operated as civilian motorboat Caesar and Viking 1915-1918

General characteristics
- Type: Patrol vessel
- Tonnage: 10 Gross register tons
- Length: 42 ft 0 in (12.80 m)
- Beam: 10 ft 0 in (3.05 m)
- Draft: 6 ft 0 in (1.83 m)
- Speed: 5.1 knots
- Armament: None

The second USS Viking (SP-3314) was a United States Navy patrol vessel in service from 1918 to 1919.

Viking was built in 1915 as the motorboat Caesar by the U.S. Navy and sold to civilian owner soon afterwards without seeing any naval service. Caesar later was renamed Viking while under private ownership. She operated at Norfolk, Virginia, while in private use.

On 5 September 1918, the U.S. Navy inspected Viking for possible naval service, and on 24 September 1918 acquired her from her owner, Mrs. E. S. Wood, for use as a section patrol boat during World War I. She served as USS Viking (SP-3314), probably in a non-commissioned status.

Assigned to the 5th Naval District, Viking operated in the vicinity of Norfolk, presumably on patrol duties, at least through the end of World War I.

On 2 February 1919, the United States Secretary of the Navy authorized the Commandant of the 5th Naval District to dispose of Viking as junk. She was stricken from the Navy List on 19 February 1919 and sold on 20 February 1919.
