= USS Venture (PC-826) =

Patrol vessel of the United States Navy

History

United States
- Ordered: as Vixen
- Laid down: 1931
- Launched: 1931
- Acquired: 27 December 1941
- Commissioned: 10 March 1942
- Decommissioned: 10 October 1945
- Stricken: 24 October 1945
- Home port: New York City, New York
- Fate: released for disposal, 12 April 1946

General characteristics
- Displacement: 138 tons (f.)
- Length: 110 ft 0 in (33.53 m)
- Beam: 17 ft 6 in (5.33 m)
- Draught: 6 ft 0 in (1.83 m) (mean)
- Speed: 17 knots
- Complement: 24
- Armament: two .50 cal (12.7 mm) machine guns, four depth charges

USS Venture (PC-826/PYc-51) was a patrol boat acquired by the U.S. Navy for the task of patrolling the coastal waters of the New York coast during World War II. Her primary task was to guard the coastal area against German submarines. For this reason, she carried depth charges.

The second ship to be named Venture by the Navy, Vixen—a wooden-hulled yacht built in 1931 by the Consolidated Shipbuilding Corp. at New York City—was acquired on 27 December 1941; designated PC-826; and commissioned on 10 March 1942.

== World War II service ==
PC-826 was assigned to the 3d Naval District and, for the duration of World War II, escorted coastwise convoys along the seaboard encompassed within the 3d Naval District and participated in searches for reported German U-boats. However, her entire career appears to have passed without any combat action.

On 15 July 1943, PC-826 became Venture and received the designation PYc-51. On 25 September 1944, she was reduced from "in commission" status to "in service" status and continued so for the remaining 13 months of her Navy career.

== Post-war decommissioning ==
After the war ended, the yacht was placed out of service at New York City on 10 October 1945; and her name was struck from the Navy list on 24 October. On 12 April 1946, she was delivered to the War Shipping Administration berthing facility located on Long Island, New York, to be sold.
