= USS Tuna (SP-664) =

Patrol vessel of the United States Navy

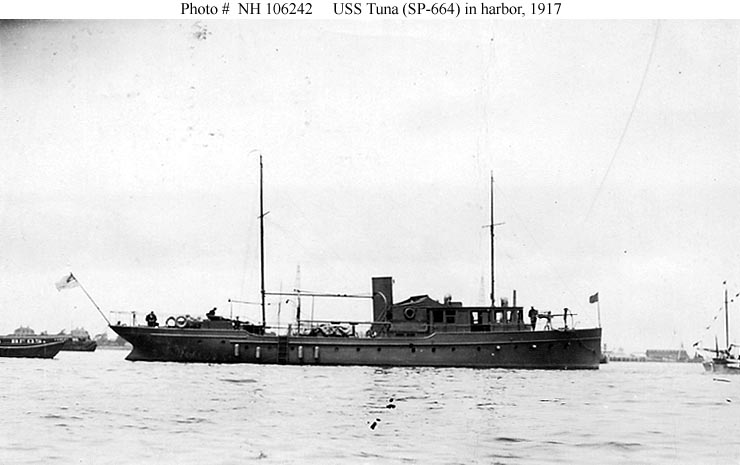
- USS Tuna (SP-664) in a harbor in the northeastern United States in 1917.

History

United States
- Name: USS Tuna
- Namesake: Previous name retained
- Builder: Neilson Yacht Building Company, Baltimore, Maryland
- Completed: 1911
- Acquired: 11 June 1917
- Commissioned: 12 June 1917
- Stricken: 11 January 1919
- Fate: Returned to owner 11 January 1919
- Notes: Operated as private yacht Tuna 1911-1917 and from 1919

General characteristics
- Type: Patrol vessel
- Tonnage: 81 gross register tons
- Length: 94 ft 0 in (28.65 m)
- Beam: 16 ft 0 in (4.88 m)
- Draft: 4 ft 0 in (1.22 m) mean
- Speed: 12 knots
- Complement: 19
- Armament: 1 × 1-pounder gun; 1 × machine gun

The first USS Tuna (SP-664) was a United States Navy patrol vessel in commission from 1917 to 1919.

Tuna was built as a private motor yacht of the same name by the Neilson Yacht Building Company at Baltimore, Maryland, in 1911. On 11 June 1917, the U.S. Navy acquired her under a free lease from her owner, Edward L. Welch of Philadelphia, Pennsylvania, for use as a section patrol boat during World War I. She was commissioned as USS Tuna (SP-664) on 12 June 1917.

Assigned to the 2nd Naval District in southern New England and based at the Block Island section base in Rhode Island, Tuna patrolled the coastline between Long Island, New York, and Martha's Vineyard in Massachusetts for the rest of World War I.

Tuna was stricken from the Navy List on 11 January 1919 and returned to Welch the same day.
