= USS Traveller (1805) =

History

United States
- Name: USS Traveller
- Namesake: Previous name retained
- Acquired: June 1805
- Fate: Sold December 1805
- Notes: Formerly a civilian fishing smack

General characteristics
- Type: Supply boat
- Tons burthen: 36 (bm)
- Sail plan: Sails

USS Traveller was a supply boat that served in the United States Navy in 1805.

Commodore Edward Preble acquired the fishing smack Traveller in June 1805 to carry supplies to American ships operating in the Mediterranean Sea. She apparently was under the command of Sailing Master Benjamin C. Prince.

Traveller was sold to Sir Alexander Ball in December 1805.
