= USS Tatnuck (ATA-195) =

Tugboat of the United States Navy

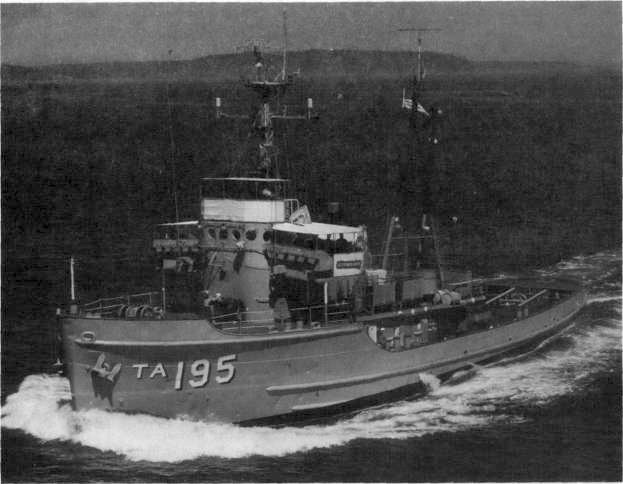
- USS Tatnuck (ATA-195)

History

United States
- Builder: Levingston Shipbuilding Co., Orange, TX
- Laid down: 15 November 1944
- Launched: 14 December 1944
- Commissioned: 26 February 1945
- Decommissioned: 1 July 1971
- Renamed: USS Tatnuck (ATA-195), 16 July 1948
- Reclassified: Auxiliary Fleet Tug ATA-195, 15 May 1944
- Stricken: 1 October 1976
- Identification: IMO number: 8429850; MMSI number: 369613000; Callsign: WDF6478
- Fate: Sold in 1979 to Marine Power & Equipment, Seattle, WA. renamed Marine Constructor

General characteristics
- Class & type: Sotoyomo-class auxiliary fleet tug
- Displacement: 534 t.(lt) 835 t.(fl)
- Length: 143 ft (44 m)
- Beam: 33 ft (10 m)
- Draft: 13 ft (4.0 m)
- Propulsion: diesel-electric engines, single screw
- Speed: 13 knots (24 km/h; 15 mph)
- Complement: 45
- Armament: one single 3 in (76 mm) dual purpose gun mount; two single 20 mm AA gun mounts

USS Tatnuck (ATA-195) was laid down on 15 November 1944 at Orange, Texas, by the Levingston Shipbuilding Co. She was launched on 14 December 1944 and commissioned on 26 February 1945. The ship was named after Tatnuck, an Indian village near Worcester, Massachusetts.

Following shakedown training in March, Tatnuck was briefly assigned to the Atlantic Fleet before being transferred to the Pacific Fleet, with her home base at Pearl Harbor. In the fall of 1945, the ocean tug served with the occupation forces in the Far East. On 26 January 1946, she departed the lagoon at Eniwetok Atoll, reached Pearl Harbor on 19 February, and remained there until 30 April when she set sail for Puget Sound. Tatnuck arrived in Bremerton, Washington, on 3 January 1947.

For the remainder of her Navy career, Tatnuck operated in the 13th Naval District. Her range of operations generally extended from the ports of southern California north along the coast of North America and west to the Aleutian Islands. However, during four of her last five years of service - 1966, 1968, 1969, and 1970 - she made voyages to Balboa, the Pacific terminus of the Panama Canal. Her primary duties included ocean towing, target towing, and salvage work. On occasion, she also assisted scientists from the University of Washington's Applied Physics Laboratory in their research work for the Navy.

After more than 26 years of service, Tatnuck was decommissioned at Bremerton, Washington, on 1 July 1971 and placed in the Pacific Reserve Fleet. In June 1979, she was sold and subsequently disposed of.

As of 2018, she is reported to be operating commercially under the name Tamaraw.
