= USS Tigress (1905) =

Patrol vessel

History

United States
- Name: USS Tigress
- Namesake: Previous name retained
- Builder: W. A. Robinson, Bridgeport, Connecticut
- Completed: 1905
- Acquired: 1917
- Commissioned: 18 August 1917
- Fate: Returned to owner after World War I
- Notes: Operated as private yawl Tigress 1905-1917 and after World War I

General characteristics
- Type: Patrol vessel
- Tonnage: 24 Gross register tons
- Length: 56 ft (17 m)
- Beam: 15 ft 3 in (4.65 m)
- Draft: 4 ft 3 in (1.30 m)
- Speed: 7 miles per hour
- Complement: 8
- Armament: 1 × 1-pounder gun; 1 × machine gun

The fourth USS Tigress was a United States Navy patrol vessel in commission from 1917 to 1918 or 1919.

Tigress was built in 1905 as a private yawl of the same name by W. A. Robinson at Bridgeport, Connecticut. On 26 June 1917, the U.S. Navy inspected her in the 7th Naval District for possible naval use and chartered her from her owner that year for use as a section patrol boat during World War I. She never received a section patrol (SP) number, but was commissioned on 18 August 1917 as USS Tigress.

Assigned to the 7th Naval District and manned by naval reservists, Tigress served on section patrol duties in the Tampa, Florida, area for the rest of World War I. The Navy returned her to her owner soon after the end of the war.
