= USS Vedette (1914) =

Patrol vessel of the United States Navy

History

United States
- Name: USS Vedette
- Namesake: Previous name retained
- Builder: Electric Launch Company (ELCO), Bayonne, New Jersey
- Completed: 1914
- Acquired: 1917 or 1918
- Fate: Returned to owner 31 December 1918
- Notes: Operated as civilian motorboat Vedette from 1914 to 1917 or 1918 and from December 1918

General characteristics
- Type: Patrol vessel
- Length: 32 ft (9.8 m)

The second USS Vedette was a United States Navy patrol vessel in commission from 1917 or 1918 to December 1918.

Vedette was built in 1914 as a civilian motorboat of the same name by the Electric Launch Company (ELCO) at Bayonne, New Jersey. She was operating in the Panama Canal Zone as the property of the Panama Canal Company when the U.S. Navy acquired her for use as a section patrol boat during World War I. She never received a section patrol (SP) number.

Vedette served on section patrol duties in the Panama Canal Zone for the rest of World War I. The Navy returned her to the Panama Canal Company on 31 December 1918.

Vedette should not be confused with the patrol vessel USS Vedette (SP-163), which also was in commission during World War I.
