= USS Terrier (SP-960) =

Patrol vessel of the United States Navy

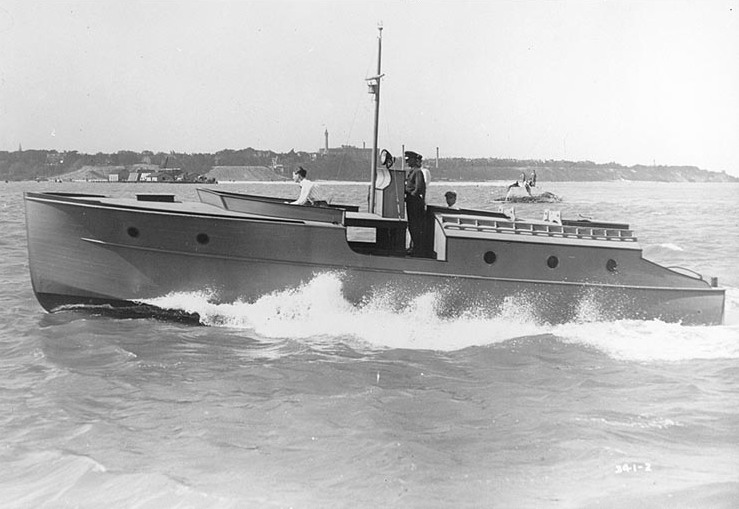
- Terrier as a private motorboat just after her completion in 1917, probably in the vicinity of Milwaukee, Wisconsin

History

United States
- Name: USS Terrier
- Namesake: Previous name retained
- Builder: Great Lakes Boat Building Corporation, Milwaukee, Wisconsin
- Completed: 1917
- Acquired: Officially 19 July 1917
- Commissioned: 1 June 1917
- Stricken: 10 March 1919
- Fate: Returned to owner 10 March 1919
- Notes: Operated as private motorboat Terrier 1917 and from 1919

General characteristics
- Type: Patrol vessel
- Length: 40 ft (12 m)
- Beam: 9 ft (2.7 m)
- Draft: 5 ft 7 in (1.70 m) forward
- Speed: 22 miles per hour
- Complement: 9
- Armament: 1 × 1-pounder gun; 1 × machine gun

The second USS Terrier (SP-960) was a United States Navy patrol vessel in commission from 1917 to 1919.

Terrier was built as a private motorboat of the same name in 1917 for Paul Armstrong of Chicago, Illinois, by the Great Lakes Boat Building Corporation at Milwaukee, Wisconsin. Armstrong had her built to a design intended specifically for naval patrol work in connection with the Preparedness Movement, and turned her over to the Navy in 1917 for use as a section patrol boat during World War I. She was commissioned on 1 June 1917 as USS Terrier (SP-960), although her formal acquisition from Armstrong did not take place until 19 July 1917.

Assigned to the 9th Naval District, Terrier patrolled Lake Michigan for the rest of World War I.

Terrier was stricken from the Navy List on 10 March 1919 and returned to Armstrong the same day.
