= USS Taniwha =

Patrol vessel of the United States Navy

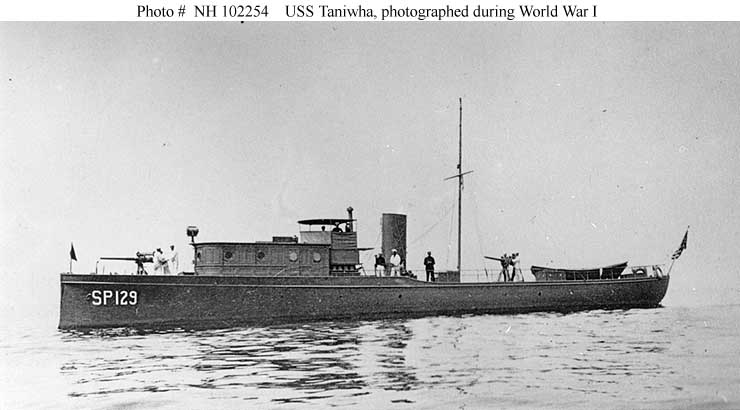
- USS Taniwha

History

United States
- Name: USS Taniwha
- Namesake: Previous name retained
- Builder: George Lawley & Son, Neponset, Massachusetts
- Completed: 1909
- Acquired: 14 May 1917 or 18 May 1917, (de facto); 29 September 1917 (formally)
- Commissioned: 14 May 1917 or 18 May 1917, (prior to formal acquisition)
- Decommissioned: 4 April 1919
- Stricken: 4 April 1919
- Fate: Returned to owner 4 April 1919 or early June 1919
- Notes: Operated as private yacht Taniwha 1909-1917 and from 1919

General characteristics
- Type: Patrol vessel
- Tonnage: 85 tons
- Length: 112 ft (34 m)
- Beam: 15 ft 6 in (4.72 m)
- Draft: 6 ft (1.8 m) (aft)
- Speed: 14 knots
- Complement: 24
- Armament: 1 × 6-pounder; 2 × machine guns

USS Taniwha (SP-129) was an armed yacht that served in the United States Navy as a patrol vessel from 1917 to 1919.

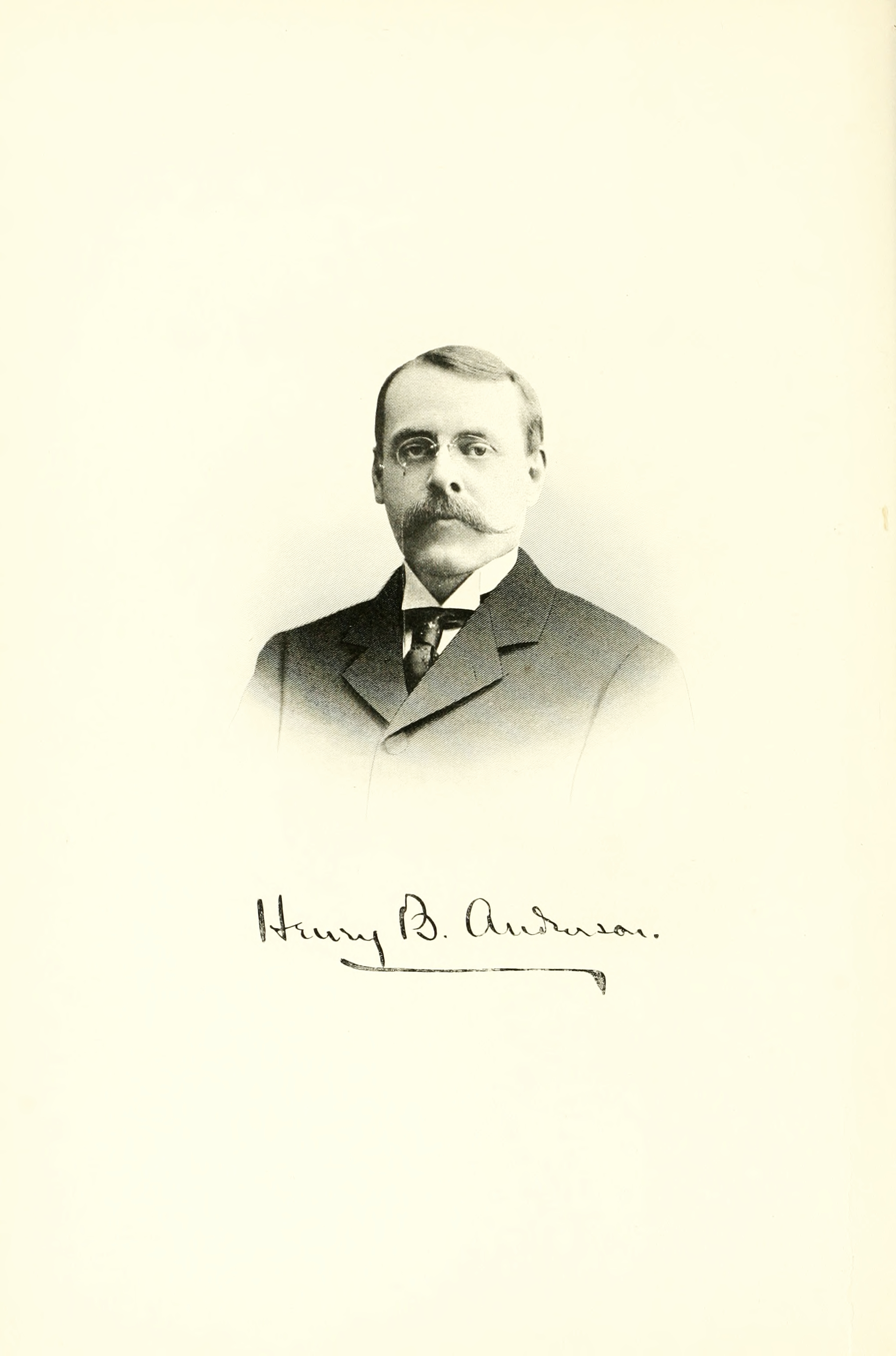
Henry Burrall Anderson

Taniwha was built as a civilian yacht in 1909 by the George Lawley & Son at Neponset, Massachusetts. The U.S. Navy acquired Taniwha under a free lease from her owner, Mr. Henry B. Anderson of New York City, for use as a patrol boat during World War I and commissioned the same day as USS Taniwha (SP-129). The date of her de facto acquisition and commissioning is reported both as 14 May 1917 and as 18 May 1917, although the Navy did not formalize her acquisition from Anderson until several months later, on 29 September 1917.

Assigned to the 3rd Naval District, Taniwha operated on section patrol protecting waters near New York City against incursions by enemy forces, particularly submarines. Her service to the Navy continued through the end of hostilities, which came on 11 November 1918.

Taniwha was decommissioned on 4 April 1919, and her name was stricken from the Navy List on the same day. She was returned to her owner either that day or in early June 1919.
