= USS Tide (SP-953) =

Minesweeper of the United States Navy

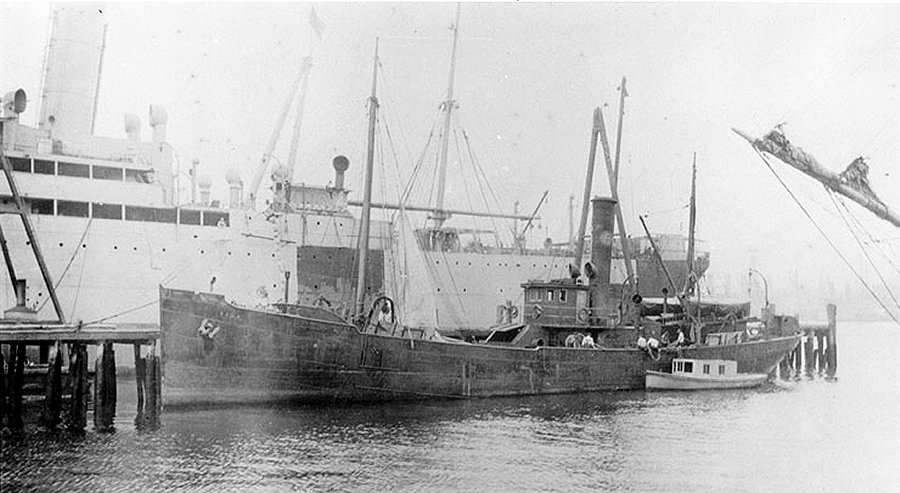

History

United States
- Name: USS Tide
- Builder: Manitowoc Shipbuilding Co., Manitowoc, Wisconsin
- Launched: 1916
- Acquired: 14 June 1918
- Stricken: Between November 1918 and October 1919
- Fate: Not indicated

General characteristics
- Type: Tugboat
- Length: 143 ft (44 m)
- Beam: 22 ft 9 in (6.93 m)
- Draft: 12 ft 5 in (3.78 m) (aft)
- Speed: 11 knots (20 km/h; 13 mph)
- Armament: 2 × 1-pounder guns

USS Tide (SP-953) was a minesweeper in the United States Navy.

Tide was a tug built in 1916 at Manitowoc, Wisconsin, by the Manitowoc Shipbuilding Co. — was acquired by the U.S. Navy on 14 June 1918 from the Bay State Fishing Co., of Boston, Massachusetts, to serve as a minesweeper in the 1st Naval District.

== Military service ==
Though never commissioned by the U.S. Navy, she may have been armed and crewed by naval reservists to patrol the waters of the 1st Naval District during the closing months of World War I.

== Deactivation ==
In any event, her name was struck from the Navy List sometime between November 1918 and October 1919.
