= USS Volador =

USS Volador has been the name of two ships in the service of the United States Navy.

- USS Volador (IX-59), a wooden-hulled schooner with an auxiliary engine
- USS Volador (SS-490), a Tench-class submarine
