= Stalwart =

Stalwart may refer to:

== Ships ==
- HMAS Stalwart, any of several Royal Australian Navy ships
- USS Stalwart, any of several US Navy ships
- Stalwart-class ocean surveillance ship, a US Navy class
  - USNS Stalwart, lead ship of the class
- RSS Stalwart, a Singapore Navy frigate

== Places ==
- Stalwart, Saskatchewan, Canada, a hamlet
- Stalwart, Michigan, a US community

== Other uses ==
- Stalwarts (politics), a late 19th century faction of the US Republican Party
- Alvis Stalwart, an amphibious military truck
- Stalwart Esports, an Indian professional mobile gaming organisation
