= Vindicator =

Vindicator may refer to:

== Characters ==
- The Vindicators, the Rick and Morty franchise superhero team and sub-series, consisting of comic books and animated series
- Heather Hudson, a character in the Marvel comic Alpha Flight
- Vindicator (Spawn), a character from the Spawn comic book
- Vindicator, a mob from Minecraft

== Literature ==
- The Vindicator (Ohio newspaper), a newspaper founded in Ohio in 1869
- The Vindicator (Ulster newspaper), Belfast Catholic newspaper 1839-1848
- The Vindicator, also known as The Liberty Vindicator, a newspaper in Liberty, Texas
- The Vindicator, the monthly periodical of the Old German Baptist Brethren

== Vehicular ==
- Vought SB2U Vindicator, a US Navy aircraft used in the 1930s
- Meggitt Vindicator II, a Canadian UAV training target drone
- USNS Vindicator (T-AGOS-3), a U.S. Navy surveillance ship
- USS Vindicator (1863), a Union Navy steam ram

=== Fictional vehicles ===
- Vindicator (G.I. Joe), a fictional hovercraft in the G.I.Joe fictional universe
- Vindicator medium fighter, a fictional space fighter from Wing Commander IV

== Other uses ==
- The Vindicator (film) (also known as Frankenstein 88), 1986 film
- Vindicators (arcade game), 1988 videogame
- Vindicator (album), 1972 by Arthur Lee
- Vindicator (Doctor Who), a device in the 2025 series of the British television science fiction show.

== See also ==
- USS Vindicator, a U.S. Navy shipname
- Vindication (disambiguation)
- Vindex (disambiguation) (Latin for vindicator)
