= Stallard =

Stallard is a surname of English origin, meaning a person who is valiant or resolute, from the Middle English stalward, meaning "stalwart". The name may refer to:

- Albert Stallard (1921–2008), British politician
- Arthur Stallard (1892–1917), English footballer
- Charles Stallard (1871–1971), South African politician
- Fred Stallard (1938–1991), English footballer
- Gwyneth Stallard, British mathematician
- H. B. Stallard (1901–1973), English athlete and eye surgeon
- Mark Stallard (born 1974), English footballer
- Mary Stallard (1862–1953), American religious leader and writer
- Mary Stallard (born 1967), Bishop of Llandaff
- Mick Stallard (1944–2002), English cyclist
- Percy Stallard (1909–2001), English cyclist
- Peter Stallard (1915–1995), British colonial administrator
- Tom Stallard (born 1978), English rower
- Tony Stallard (born 1958), English artist
- Tracy Stallard (1937–2017), American baseball player
