= USS Vindicator =

Two ships of the United States Navy have borne the name USS Vindicator.

- USS Vindicator (1863), was a sidewheel steam ram, launched in 1863 and struck in 1865.
- USNS Vindicator (T-AGOS-3), was an ocean surveillance ship, launched in 1984 and struck in 1993.

== See also ==
- Vindicator (disambiguation)
