= Prevail (IX-537) =

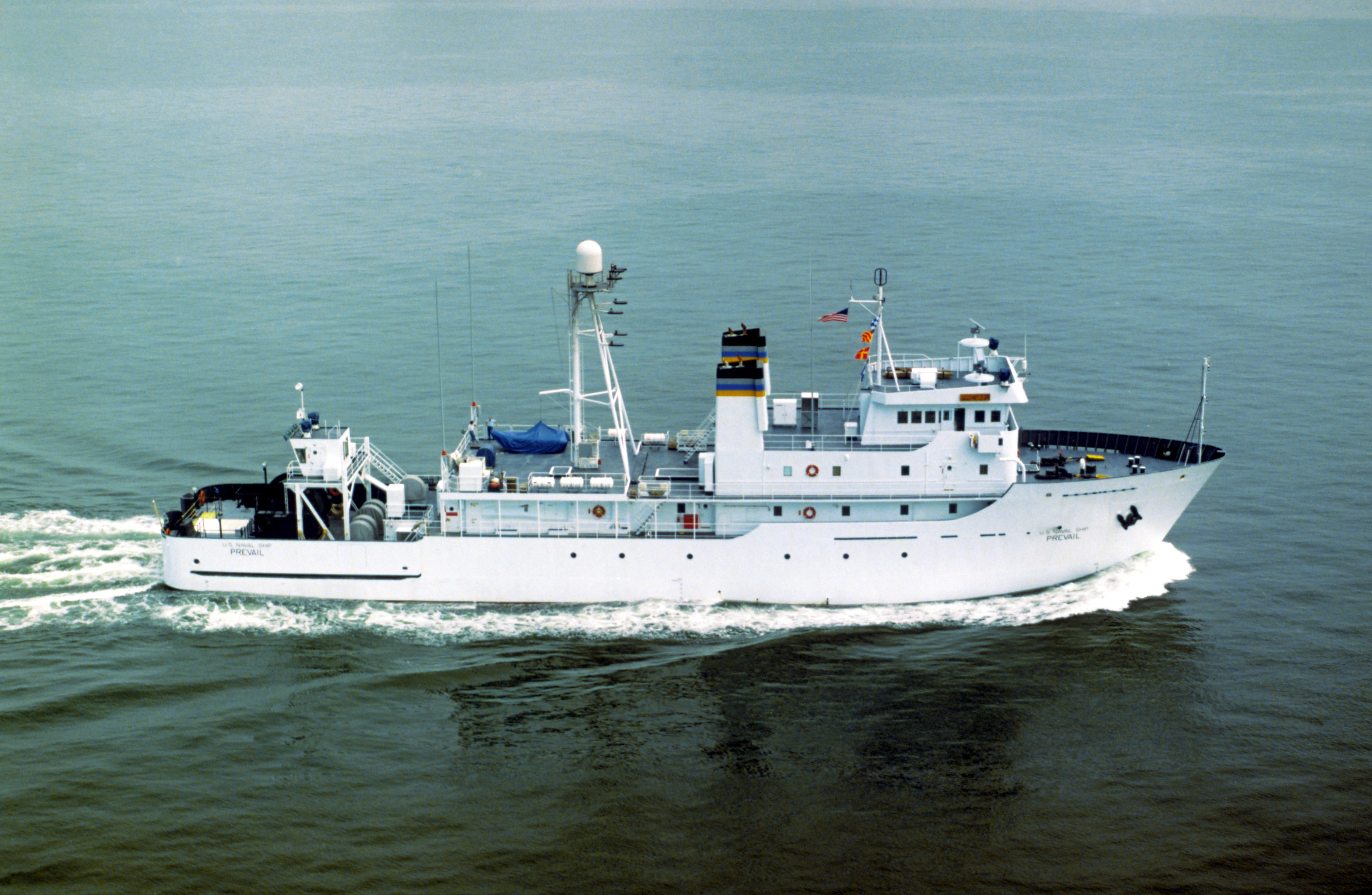
- USNS Prevail (T-AGOS-8), 1986

History

United States
- Awarded: 13 February 1981
- Builder: Tacoma Boatbuilding Company
- Laid down: 13 March 1985
- Launched: 7 December 1985
- In service: 4 March 1986
- Reclassified: IX-537 17 October 2003
- Identification: IMO number: 8835566; MMSI number: 367841000; Callsign: NYRW
- Status: in active service

General characteristics
- Class & type: Stalwart-class ocean surveillance ship
- Displacement: 1,565 tons (light) 2,535 tons (full)
- Length: 224 ft (68 m)
- Beam: 43 ft (13 m)
- Draft: 15 ft (4.6 m)
- Speed: 11 knots (20 km/h; 13 mph)
- Complement: 33

Prevail (IX-537) is a modified Stalwart-class auxiliary general ocean surveillance ship (AGOS) of the United States Navy previously operated by the U.S. Military Sealift Command as T-AGOS 8. Prevail was reclassified as Unclassified Miscellaneous (IX) in October 2003 and is unofficially referred to as TSV-1. In this context, TSV stands for Training Support Vessel, and should not be confused with the U.S. Army's USAV Spearhead Theater Support Vessel initiative.

Prevail is currently assigned to Commander, Carrier Strike Group Four and is operated with a minimal, hybrid crew of civil service and contract mariners. The ship provides a dedicated training support for Strike Group training for U.S. Atlantic Fleet ships, including serving as a platform for training Visit, Board, Search, and Seizure (VBSS) operations.

Stalwart-class ships were originally designed to collect underwater acoustical data in support of Cold War anti-submarine warfare operations in the 1980s.

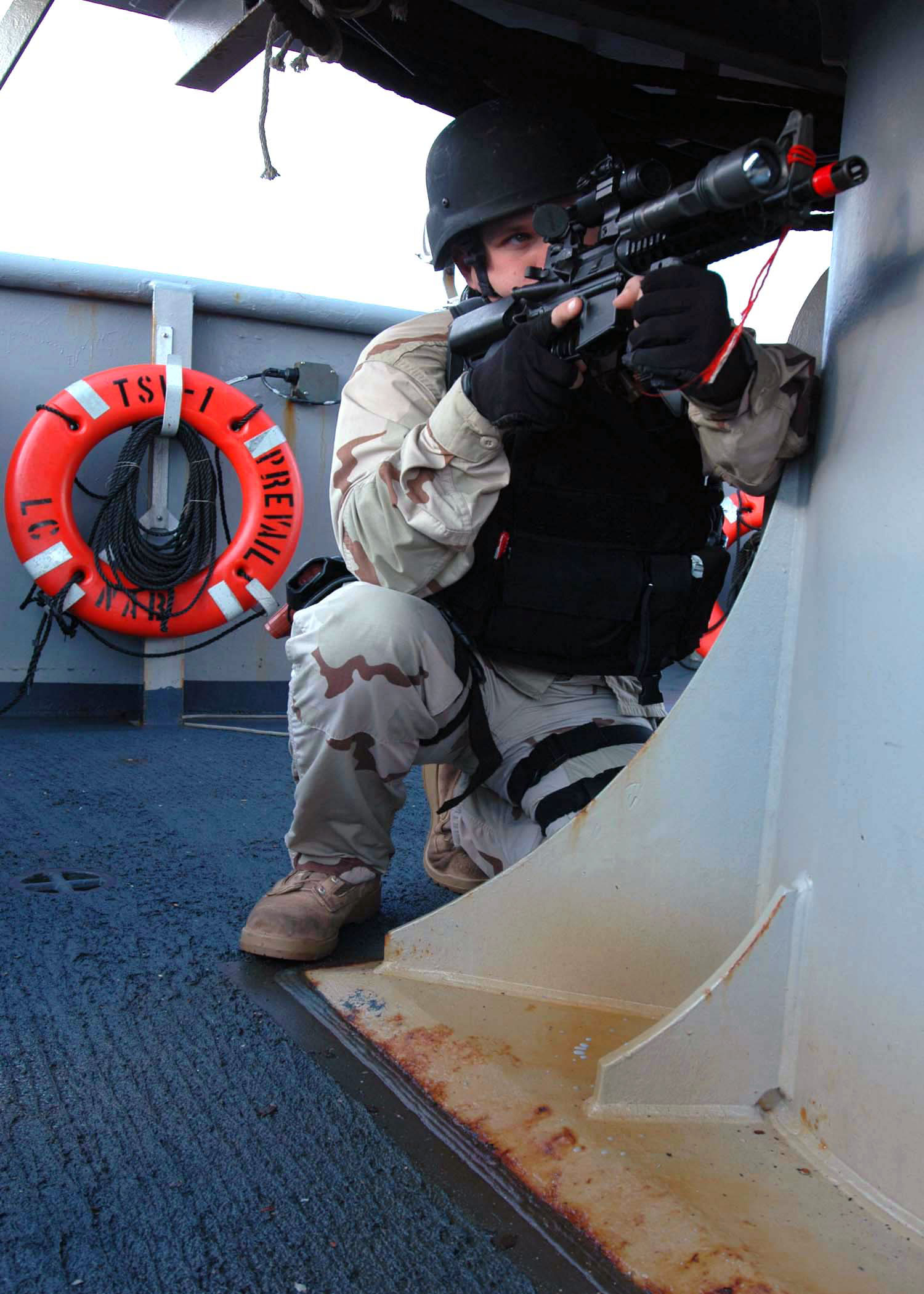
A sailor provides cover during a simulation aboard the training support vessel Prevail. Prevail offers a training environment for VBSS teams to test their maritime security operations skills.

== Design ==
The Stalwart-class ocean surveillance ships were succeeded by the longer Victorious class. Prevail had an overall length of 224 feet (68 m) and a length of 203 feet 6 inches (62.03 m) at its waterline. It had a beam of 43 feet (13 m) and a draft of 15 feet (4.6 m). The surveillance ship had a displacement of 1,600 tonnes (1,600 long tons; 1,800 short tons) at light load and 2,301 tonnes (2,265 long tons; 2,536 short tons) at full load. It was powered by a diesel-electric system of four Caterpillar D-398 diesel-powered generators and two General Electric 550 metric horsepower (540 shp; 400 kW) electric motors. This produced a total of 3,200 metric horsepower (3,200 shp; 2,400 kW) that drove two shafts. It had a gross register tonnage of 1,584 and a deadweight tonnage of 786.

The Stalwart-class ocean surveillance ships had maximum speeds of 11 knots (20 km/h; 13 mph). They were built to be fitted with the Surveillance Towed Array Sensor System (SURTASS) system. The ship had an endurance of thirty days. It had a range of 3,000 miles (2,600 nmi; 4,800 km) and a speed of 11 knots (20 km/h; 13 mph). Its complement was between thirty-two and forty-seven. Its hull design was similar to that of the Powhatan-class tugboats.
