= SUNY Maritime =

SUNY Maritime may refer to:

- State University of New York Maritime College
- SUNY Maritime, the former USNS Stalwart (T-AGOS-1); acquired by the State University of New York Maritime College after decommissioned by the U.S. Navy in 2002
