= USNS Titan =

American oceanographic vessel

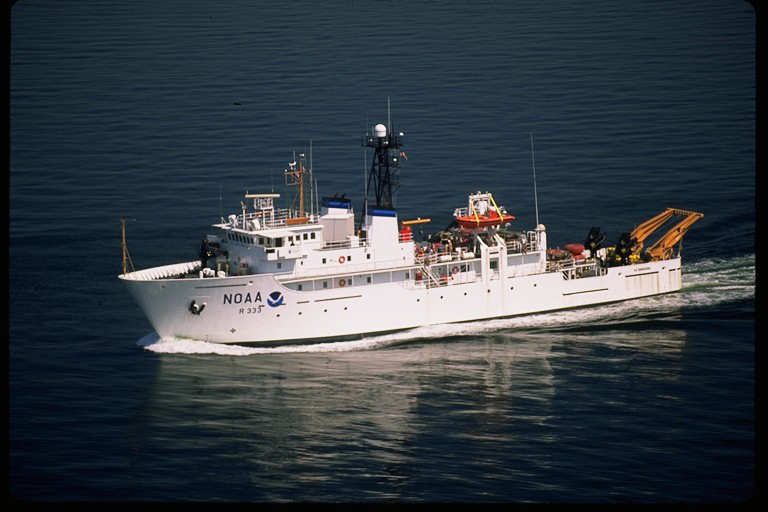
- NOAAS Ka'Imimoana (R 333), ex-USNS Titan (T-AGOS-15), sometime between 1996 and 2009.

History

United States
- Name: USNS Titan (T-AGOS-15)
- Namesake: A titan is something or someone of very large stature, greatness, or godliness
- Operator: Military Sealift Command
- Ordered: June 30, 1986
- Builder: VT Halter Marine, Inc., Moss Point, Mississippi
- Laid down: October 30, 1986
- Launched: June 18, 1988
- Acquired: March 8, 1989 (delivered)
- In service: March 8, 1989
- Out of service: August 31, 1993
- Stricken: August 31, 1993
- Fate: Transferred to National Oceanic and Atmospheric Administration, August 31, 1993

United States
- Name: NOAAS Ka'imimoana (R 333)
- Namesake: Ka'imimoana is a Hawaiian word meaning "Ocean Seeker"
- Acquired: August 31, 1993
- Commissioned: April 25, 1996
- Decommissioned: June 18, 2014
- Home port: Pearl Harbor, Hawaii
- Identification: IMO number: 8835231; MMSI number: 369228000; Callsign: WDJ3639
- Status: Inactive in NOAA Pacific Fleet

General characteristics (as U.S. Navy ocean surveillance ship)
- Class & type: Stalwart class
- Displacement: 2,250 tons (as built)
- Length: 224 ft (68 m)
- Beam: 43 ft (13 m)
- Draft: 16.0 ft (4.9 m)
- Propulsion: Diesel-electric, two shafts, 1,600 hp
- Speed: 11 kt cruise
- Crew: 36

General characteristics (as NOAA oceanographic research ship)
- Class & type: ex-U.S. Navy Stalwart-class research ship
- Tonnage: 2,014 GT; 604 NT
- Displacement: 1,650 tons (light); 2,301 tons (full load)
- Length: 224 ft (68 m)
- Beam: 43 ft (13 m)
- Draft: 15 ft (4.6 m)
- Installed power: 1,600 hp (1.2 MW)
- Propulsion: Diesel-electric: Two General Electric 800 hp (0.60 MW) diesel engines, twin fixed-pitch propellers, 116,000 US gal (440 m^{3}) fuel; 550 hp (0.41 MW) Schottel bow thruster
- Speed: 10.5 knots (19.4 km/h; 12.1 mph) (sustained)
- Range: 8,000 nautical miles (15,000 km; 9,200 mi)
- Endurance: 30 days
- Boats & landing craft carried: One 22 ft (6.7 m) rigid-hulled inflatable boat (RHIB); one 17-foot (5.2-meter) inflatable utility boat
- Complement: 20 (3 NOAA Corps officers, 1 U.S. Public Health Service Health Programs Officer, 3 licensed engineers, and 13 other crew) plus up to 12 scientists
- Sensors & processing systems: Deep-water echosounder, shallow-water echosounder, hull-mounted acoustic release transducer, navigation fathometer, X-band radar, S-band radar, Global Positioning System receivers, VHF radio direction finder, Sperry gyrocompass
- Notes: Welded steel, ice-strengthened hull

USNS Titan (T-AGOS-15) was a Stalwart-class modified tactical auxiliary general ocean surveillance ship in service in the United States Navy from 1989 to 1993. From 1996 to 2014, she was in commission in the National Oceanic and Atmospheric Administration (NOAA) fleet as the oceanographic research ship NOAAS Ka'imimoana (R 333).

== Construction ==
The U.S. Navy ordered Titan from VT Halter Marine, Inc., on June 30, 1986. VT Halter Marine laid her down at Moss Point, Mississippi, on October 30, 1986, launched her on June 18, 1988, and delivered her to the U.S. Navy on March 8, 1989.

== United States Navy service ==
On the day of her delivery, the U.S. Navy placed the ship in non-commissioned service in the Military Sealift Command as USNS Titan (T-AGOS-15). Like the other Stalwart-class ships, she was designed to collect underwater acoustical data in support of Cold War anti-submarine warfare operations against Soviet Navy submarines using Surveillance Towed Array Sensor System (SURTASS) sonar equipment. She operated with a mixed crew of U.S. Navy personnel and civilian merchant mariners.

After the Cold War ended with the collapse of the Soviet Union in late December 1991, the requirement for SURTASS collection declined. The Navy took Titan out of service on August 31, 1993 and struck her from the Naval Vessel Register and transferred to the National Oceanic and Atmospheric Administration (NOAA) the same day.

== National Oceanic and Atmospheric Administration service ==
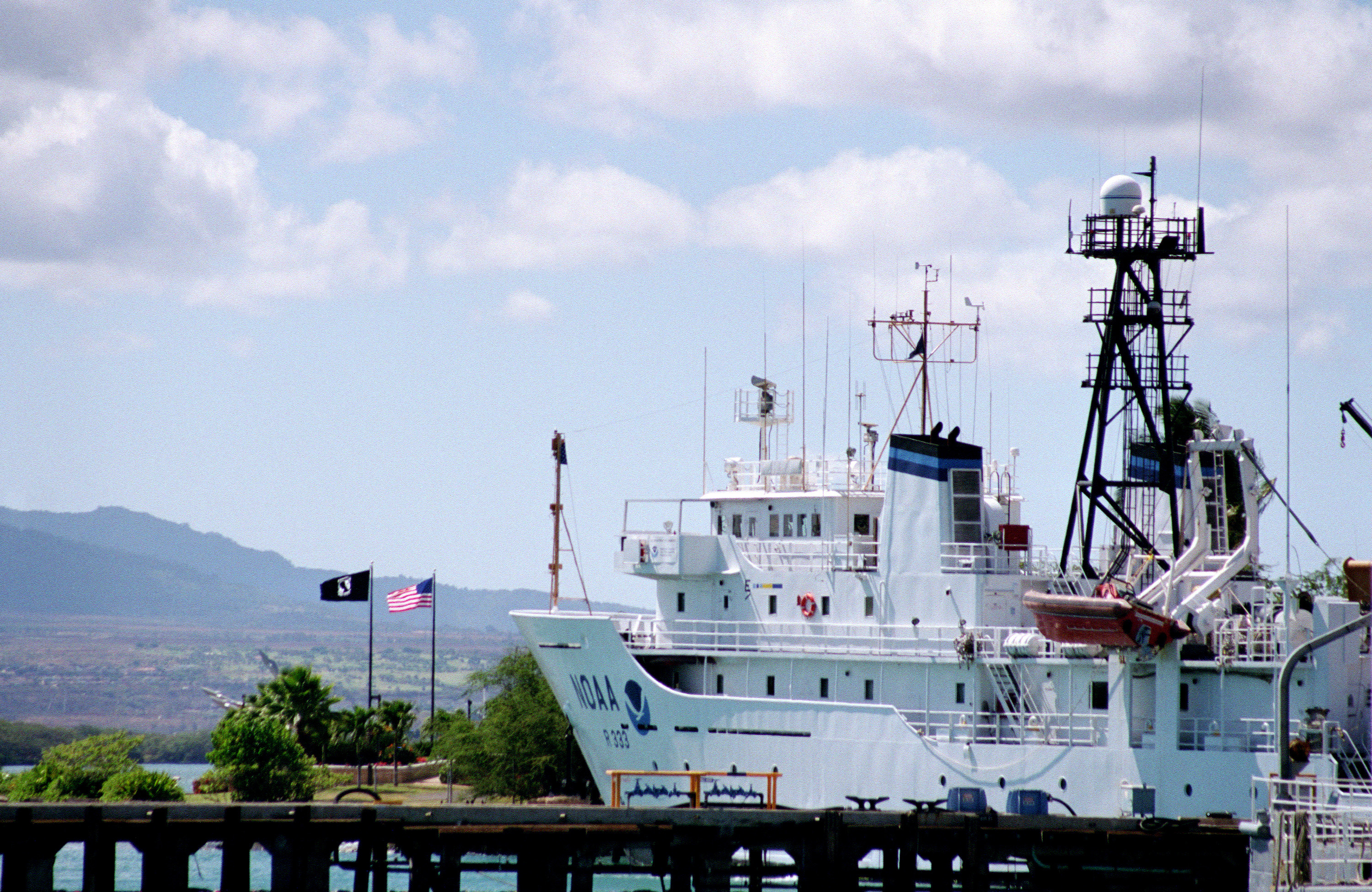
NOAAS Ka'Imimoana (R 333) moored at Bishop Point wharf at the entrance to Pearl Harbor, Hawaii, on June 6, 2000.

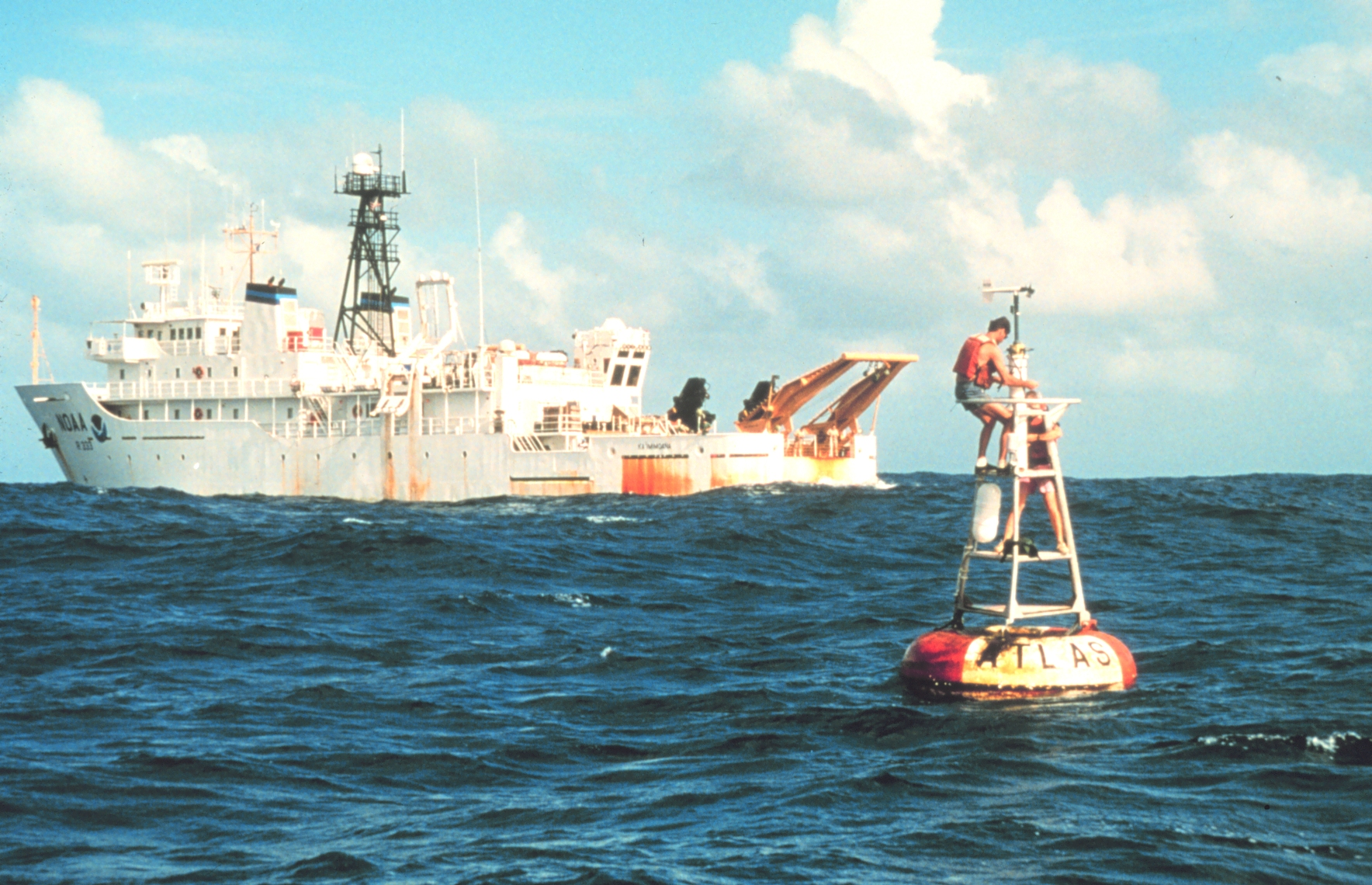
NOAAS Ka'imimoana (R 333) services an Atlas buoy in the equatorial Pacific Ocean. Atlas buoys measure ocean temperature at varying depths and provide warning of upcoming El Niño and La Niña events.

The conversion of Titan into an oceanographic research ship began in May 1995 at the shipyard of Maritime Contractors, Inc., at Bellingham, Washington. Delivered to NOAA in April 1996 after completion of the conversion, the ship was commissioned into NOAA service as NOAAS Ka'imimoana (R 333) on April 25, 1996.

=== Capabilities ===
Ka'imimoana has berthing for 33 people in 21 single staterooms and six double staterooms providing her with the capacity to carry up to 12 scientists. She can seat 24 people at a time in two crew's mess rooms, eight in the forward room and 16 in the aft room. She has a medical treatment room with one bunk, overseen by a United States Public Health Service Health Programs Officer.

Ka'imimoana has 950 sq ft (88 m^{2}) of laboratory space. On deck, she has a brailing winch, a CTD winch, three cranes, an A-frame, and a J-frame. She carries two boats, a 22 ft (6.7 m) rigid-hulled inflatable boat (RHIB) as a rescue boat and a 17 ft (5.2 m) inflatable utility boat. She is equipped with echosounders, a hull-mounted acoustic release transducer, a navigation fathometer, X-band and S-band radar, Global Positioning System receivers, a VHF radio direction finder, and a Sperry gyrocompass.

=== Career ===
Ka'imimoana was home-ported at Pearl Harbor, Hawaii, and was the only NOAA ship dedicated solely to climate research. She supported NOAA's Tropical Atmosphere Ocean project, which is designed to improve understanding of the role of the tropical ocean in modifying the world's climate.

Ka'imimoana deployed, recovered, and serviced the National Data Buoy Center's deep-sea moorings—which measure ocean currents, ocean temperatures, and atmospheric variables—in the equatorial Pacific Ocean and transmitted buoy measurements in real time to NOAA's Pacific Marine Environmental Laboratory in Seattle, Washington. She also continuously measured upper ocean currents, surface salinity, carbon dioxide content, and sea-level atmospheric conditions while underway.

Ka'imimoana was retired by NOAA on June 18, 2014. .

Ka'imimoana was purchased by Pacific Survey Group in 2015 and renamed the Ocean Titan. Upon acquisition of the Ka Imimoana from NOAA, Pacific Survey Group conducted an extensive mid-life upgrade in 2016/2017. All vessel systems were renewed and upgraded to modern technology. State of the art navigation and position control systems were added to make the vessel DP2. As part of this upgrade 4 new Caterpillar EPA approved generator packages were installed, three additional tunnel thrusters, all new electric drives and controls, power management, switchboard control automation, and alarm and monitoring systems. All critical systems were made fully redundant making the vessel ABS and USCG approved DP2. Additionally, the vessel’s interior was completely redone to give a more comfortable feel for clients and crew as well as increased berthing for clients.

These modifications make the Ocean Titan one of the only fully redundant DP2 Research Vessel’s in private operation in the US. Additionally, her upgrades make her not only versatile but incredibly efficient and acoustically quiet due to extensive sound dampening and vibration reductions. The improvements also increased the vessel's speed, range, and endurance.
