= NRP Almirante Gago Coutinho =

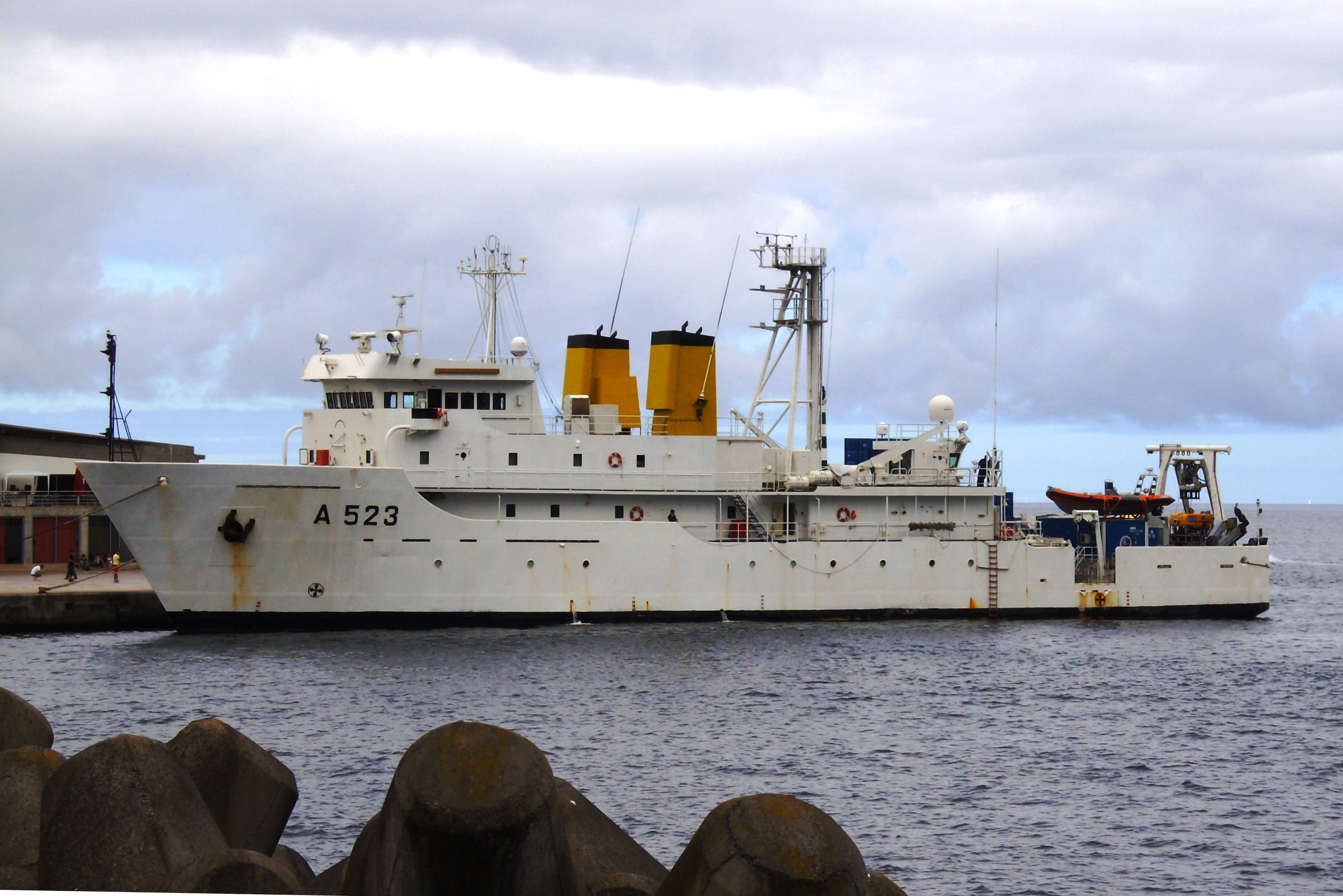
- NRP Almirante Gago Coutinho at Pipas port, Azores.

History

United States
- Name: USNS Assurance
- In service: 1 May 1985
- Out of service: 6 January 1995
- Stricken: 6 January 1995
- Identification: T-AGOS-5
- Fate: Transferred to Portugal 1999

Portugal
- Name: NRP Almirante Gago Coutinho
- Namesake: Gago Coutinho
- Acquired: September 1999
- Commissioned: 1999
- In service: 1999
- Identification: IMO number: 8835499; Callsign: NDPY; A523
- Status: In service

General characteristics
- Class & type: Stalwart-class ocean surveillance ship
- Displacement: 1,565 tons (light); 2,535 tons (full)
- Length: 224 ft (68 m)
- Beam: 43 ft (13 m)
- Draft: 15 ft (4.6 m)
- Complement: 20

NRP Almirante Gago Coutinho (A523) is a ship of the Portuguese Navy's Dom Carlos I-class survey vessels (ex-US Stalwart-class ocean surveillance ship adapted in Portugal for the execution of hydrography and oceanography surveys). Before transfer to the Portuguese Navy, Almirante Gago Coutinho was formerly USNS Assurance (T-AGOS-5) of the United States Navy.

== Design ==
The Stalwart-class ocean surveillance ships were succeeded by the longer Victorious class. Assurance had an overall length of 224 feet (68 m) and a length of 203 feet 6 inches (62.03 m) at its waterline. It had a beam of 43 feet (13 m) and a draft of 15 feet (4.6 m). The surveillance ship had a displacement of 1,600 tonnes (1,600 long tons; 1,800 short tons) at light load and 2,301 tonnes (2,265 long tons; 2,536 short tons) at full load. It was powered by a diesel-electric system of four Caterpillar D-398 diesel-powered generators and two General Electric 550 metric horsepower (540 shp; 400 kW) electric motors. This produced a total of 3,200 metric horsepower (3,200 shp; 2,400 kW) that drove two shafts. It had a gross register tonnage of 1,584 tons and a deadweight tonnage of 786 tons.

The Stalwart-class ocean surveillance ships had maximum speeds of 11 knots (20 km/h; 13 mph). They were built to be fitted with the Surveillance Towed Array Sensor System (SURTASS) system. The ship had an endurance of thirty days. It had a range of 3,000 miles (2,600 nmi; 4,800 km) and a speed of 11 knots (20 km/h; 13 mph). Its complement was between thirty-two and forty-seven. Its hull design was similar to that of the Powhatan-class tugboats.

== History ==
USNS Assurance was a Stalwart-class modified tactical auxiliary general ocean surveillance ship of the United States Navy. Stalwart-class ships were originally designed to collect underwater acoustical data in support of Cold War anti-submarine warfare operations in the 1980s.

In 1999, ex-USNS Assurance was transferred to Portugal and is now NRP Almirante Gago Coutinho survey ship.
