= USNS Worthy =

Stalwart-class ocean surveillance ship

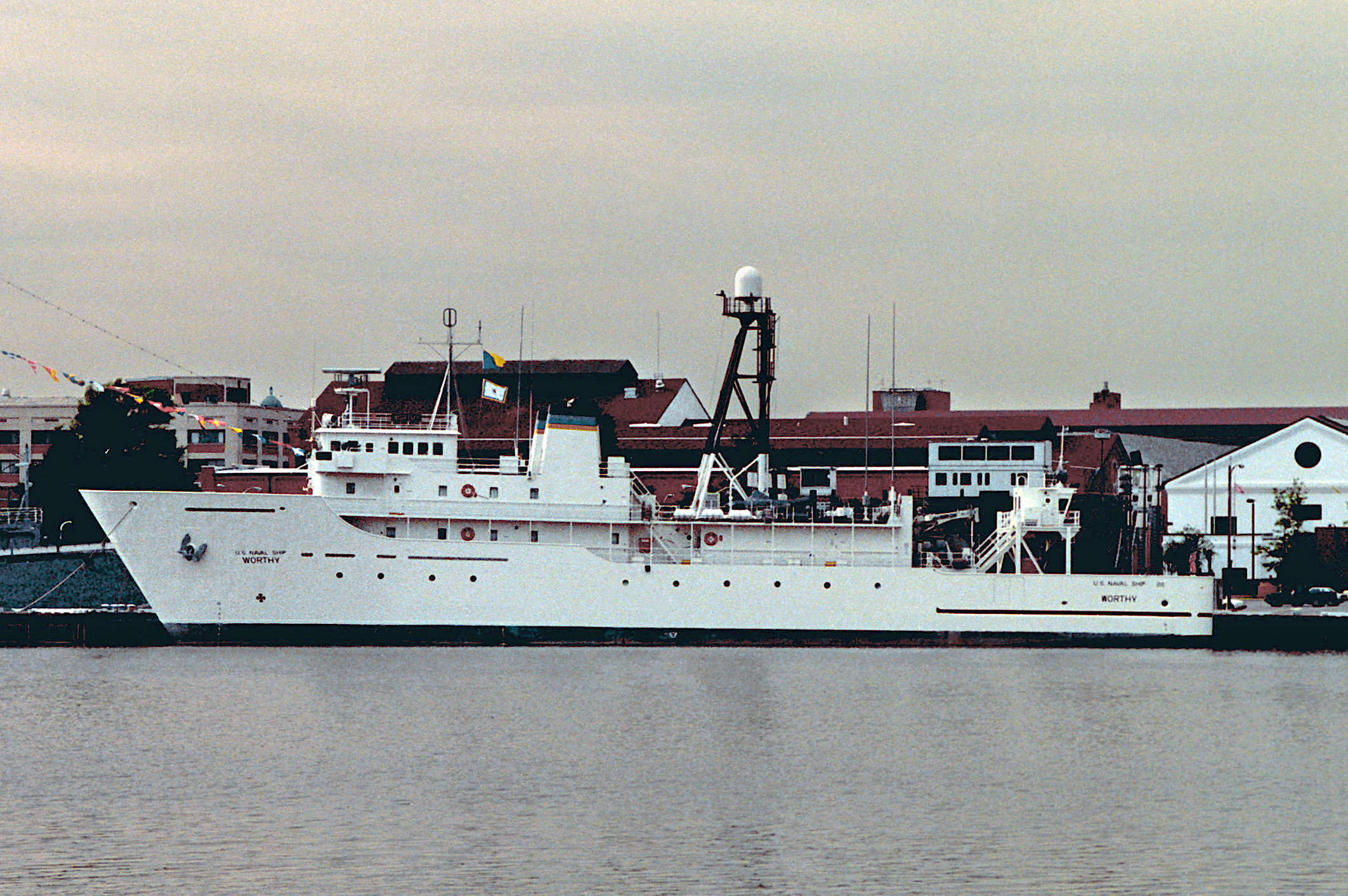
- USNS Worthy (T-AGOS-14) at Washington Navy Yard, 1989.

History

United States Navy
- Name: USNS Worthy (T-AGOS-14)
- Ordered: April 5, 1985
- Builder: VT Halter Marine, Inc.
- Laid down: April 3, 1986
- Launched: February 6, 1988
- Stricken: May 20, 1993
- Fate: Transferred in 1995 to the United States Army

United States Army
- Name: USAV Worthy (T-AGOS-14)
- Acquired: 1995
- Identification: IMO number: 8835229; MMSI number: 338982000; Callsign: AAEJ
- Status: In active service, as of 2020

General characteristics
- Displacement: 1,565 t.(lt) 2,535 t.(fl)
- Length: 224 ft (68 m)
- Beam: 43 ft (13 m)
- Draught: 15 ft (4.6 m)
- Propulsion: diesel-electric, two shafts, 1,600 hp
- Speed: 11 knots (20 km/h; 13 mph)

The USNS Worthy (T-AGOS-14) is a modified Stalwart-class ocean surveillance ship that was previously operated by the United States Navy. Since 1995 it has been operated by the United States Army.

== Design ==
The Stalwart-class ocean surveillance ships were succeeded by the longer Victorious-class ocean surveillance ships. Worthy had an overall length of 224 feet (68 m) and a length of 203 feet 6 inches (62.03 m) at its waterline. It had a beam of 43 feet (13 m) and a draft of 15 feet (4.6 m). The surveillance ship had a displacement of 1,600 tonnes (1,600 long tons; 1,800 short tons) at light load and 2,301 tonnes (2,265 long tons; 2,536 short tons) at full load. It was powered by a diesel-electric system of four Caterpillar D-398 diesel-powered generators and two General Electric 550 metric horsepower (540 shp; 400 kW) electric motors. This produced a total of 3,200 metric horsepower (3,200 shp; 2,400 kW) that drove two shafts. It had a gross register tonnage of 1,584 and a deadweight tonnage of 786.

The Stalwart-class ocean surveillance ships had maximum speeds of 11 knots (20 km/h; 13 mph). They were built to be fitted with the Surveillance Towed Array Sensor System (SURTASS) system. The ship had an endurance of thirty days. It had a range of 3,000 miles (2,600 nmi; 4,800 km) and a speed of 11 knots (20 km/h; 13 mph). Its complement was between thirty-two and forty-seven. Its hull design was similar to that of the Powhatan-class tugboats.

== History ==
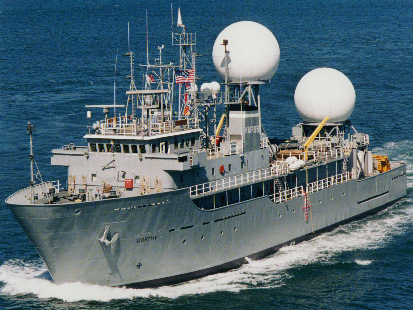
US Army Vessel Worthy as Kwajalein Mobile Range Safety System, October 1995.

Stalwart-class ships were originally designed to collect underwater acoustical data in support of Cold War anti-submarine warfare operations in the 1980s. USNS Worthy was struck from the Navy registry in 1993 and modified to be Kwajalein Mobile Range Safety System (KMRSS) Worthy, a missile range instrumentation ship at Kwajalein Atoll's Ronald Reagan Ballistic Missile Defense Test Site, operated by the United States Army.
