= Vindicated =

Vindicated may refer to:

- Vindicated (book), a 2008 book by former baseball player José Canseco
- "Vindicated" (song), a 2004 song by Dashboard Confessional
- "Vindicated" (Invader Zim), an episode of the American animated series Invader Zim

== See also ==
- Vindication (disambiguation)
