= USNS Capable =

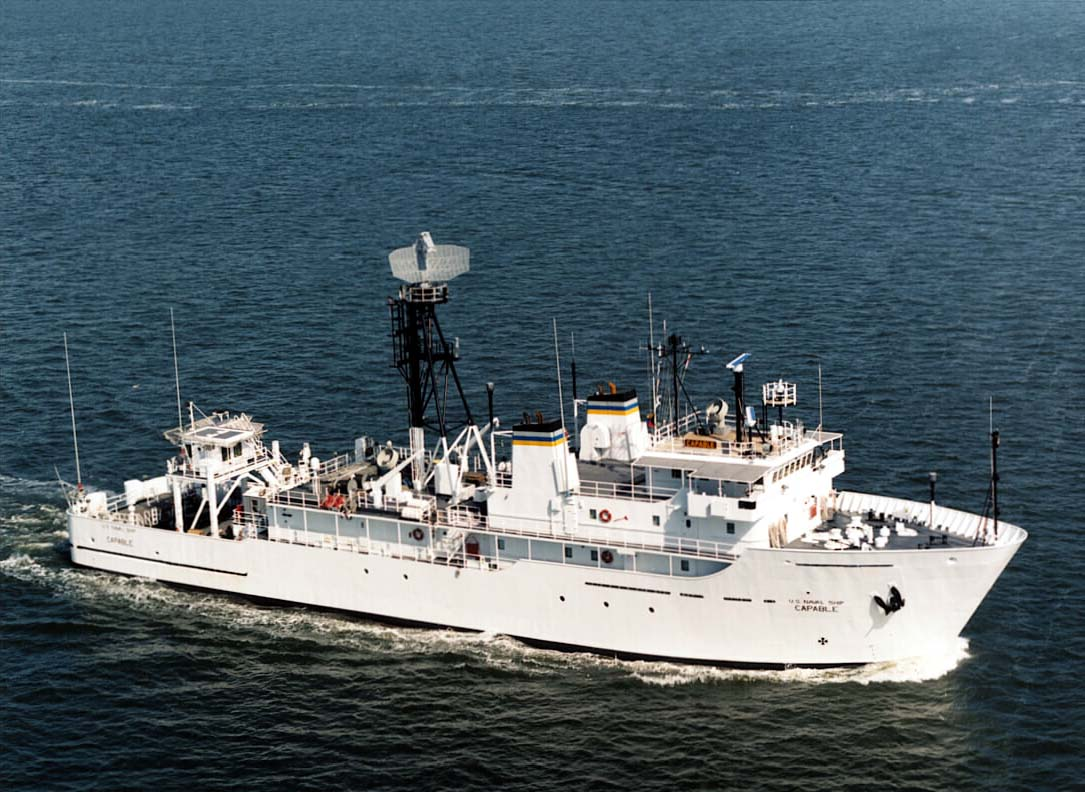
- USNS Capable (T-AGOS-16) after removal of SURTASS and addition of AN/SPS-40 air search radar for drug interdiction operations.

History

United States
- Name: USNS Capable (T-AGOS-16)
- Namesake: Capable: Able and efficient
- Awarded: 20 February 1987
- Builder: VT Halter Marine, Inc., Moss Point, Mississippi
- Laid down: 17 October 1987
- Launched: 28 October 1988
- In service: 9 June 1989
- Out of service: 14 September 2004
- Stricken: 14 September 2004
- Identification: IMO number: 8835114
- Fate: Transferred to National Oceanic and Atmospheric Administration 14 September 2004

General characteristics (as U.S. Navy ocean surveillance ship)
- Class & type: Stalwart-class ocean surveillance ship
- Displacement: 1565 tons (light) 2265 tons (full)
- Length: 224 ft (68 m)
- Beam: 43 ft (13 m)
- Draft: 15 ft (4.6 m)
- Propulsion: Diesel-electric, two shafts, 1,600 hp (1,193 kW)
- Speed: 11 knots (20 km/h)
- Complement: 33 (15 U.S. Navy personnel, 18 civilians)
- Armament: none

USNS Capable (T-AGOS-16) was a Stalwart-class modified tactical auxiliary general ocean surveillance ship of the United States Navy in service from 1989 to 2004. In 2008, she was commissioned into service in the National Oceanic and Atmospheric Administration as the oceanographic research ship NOAAS Okeanos Explorer (R 337).

== Construction ==
Capable was laid down by VT Halter Marine, Inc., at Moss Point, Mississippi, on 17 October 1987. She was launched on 28 October 1988 and delivered to the U.S. Navy on 9 June 1989.

== U.S. Navy service ==
The U.S. Navy placed the ship upon delivery in non-commissioned service with the Military Sealift Command as the United States Naval Ship USNS Capable (T-AGOS-16). Designed to collect underwater acoustical data in support of anti-submarine warfare operations, Capable spent the final years of the Cold War towing Surveillance Towed Array Sensor System (SURTASS) sonar equipment to hunt for Soviet Navy submarines. She operated with a mixed crew of Navy personnel and civilian merchant mariners.

After the Cold War ended with the collapse of the Soviet Union in late December 1991, requirements for such surveillance declined. Later in the 1990s, Capable's SURTASS gear was removed and she received an AN/SPS-40E radar for use in counternarcotics surveillance.

The Navy withdrew Capable from service on 14 September 2004. It struck her from the Naval Vessel Register and transferred her to the National Oceanic and Atmospheric Administration (NOAA) the same day.
