= USCGC Point Divide =

United States Coast Guard cutter

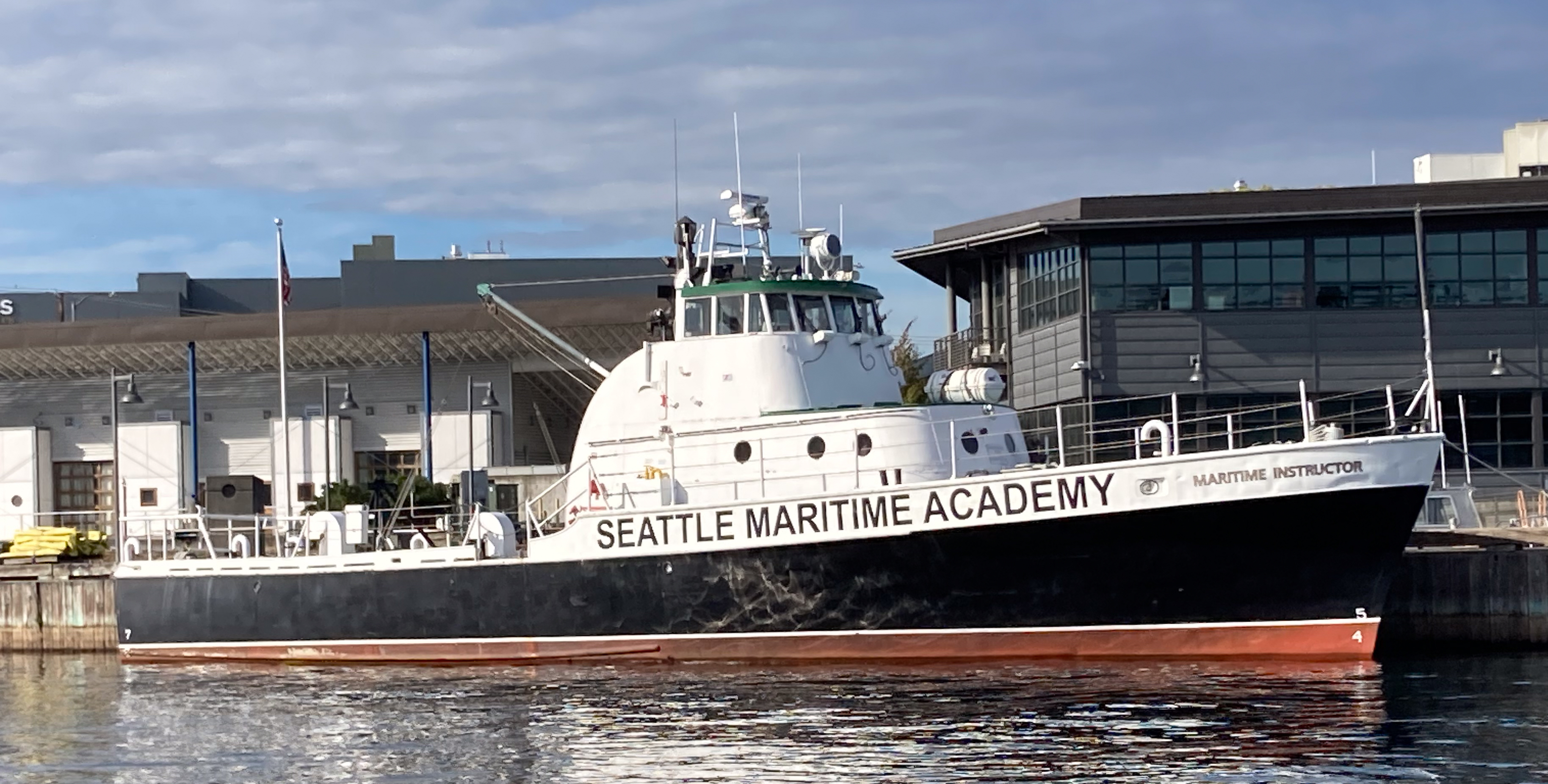
- Maritime Instructor, ex-Point Divide

History

United States
- Name: Point Divide
- Owner: United States Coast Guard
- Builder: Coast Guard Yard, Curtis Bay, Maryland
- Commissioned: 19 September 1962
- Decommissioned: 30 March 1995
- Fate: Transferred to Seattle Maritime Academy

United States
- Name: Maritime Instructor
- Owner: Seattle Maritime Academy
- Identification: Official number:1033659; Radio call sign: WDE6912

General characteristics as built
- Type: Point-class patrol boat
- Displacement: 66.1 tons, full load
- Length: 82 ft 10 in (25.25 m)
- Beam: 17 ft 7 in (5.36 m) max
- Draft: 5 ft 9 in (1.75 m)
- Propulsion: 2 × 800 hp (597 kW) Cummins diesel engines
- Speed: 23.7 knots (43.9 km/h; 27.3 mph)
- Complement: 8 men
- Armament: 1 Oerlikon 20 mm cannon

USCGC Point Divide (WPB-82337) was an 82-foot (25 m) Point-class cutter constructed for the United States Coast Guard. She was built and commissioned in 1962 for use as a law enforcement, harbor patrol, and search and rescue boat. She was stationed in Southern California until 1995 when she was decommissioned.

The cutter was donated to the Seattle Maritime Academy for use as a training vessel in 1995. She was renamed Maritime Instructor, and remains in service with the school.

== Construction and characteristics ==
Point Divide was constructed at the Coast Guard Yard at Curtis Bay, Maryland. Her keel was laid on 4 December 1961. Her hull was built of welded steel plates while her superstructure was built of aluminum to save weight. Over the course of Point-class production there were several modifications to the original design. Point Divide was a C-series cutter. As built, her hull was 82 ft 10 in (25.25 m) long overall, with a beam of 17 feet 7 inches (5.36 m), and a full load draft of 5.75 feet (1.75 m). She displaced 66.1 long tons, fully loaded.

Point Divide was originally powered by two 12-cylinder Cummins VT-12-M Diesel engines, each of which developed 800 horsepower. These each drove a five-bladed, fixed-pitch propeller which was 3.5 feet (1.1 m) in diameter. This propulsion package gave the cutter a maximum speed of 23.7 knots. The engine exhausts ran through the transom, rather than a conventional stack, giving better all-around visibility on the bridge.

In 1989, the Coast Guard awarded Caterpillar a $5.7 million contract to replace the main engines in 43 of the Point-class cutters, including Point Divide. Two 12-cylinder Caterpillar 3412 engines, each rated at 750 horsepower, were installed. They were each connected to a Twin-Disc 518-M transmission. These engines remain aboard today.

Electrical power on the patrol boat was provided by two 20 Kw Cummins generators.

Her fuel tanks held 1,830 US gallons (6,900 L) of Diesel oil which gave her an unrefueled range of 1584 miles. Her potable water tanks held 1,270 US gallons (4,800 L) of fresh water.

Point Divide's original complement was eight enlisted sailors, led by a chief petty officer.

The main armament of Point Divide was an Oerlikon 20 mm cannon.

Since the Coast Guard policy in 1962 was not to name cutters under 100 feet (30 m) in length she was designated as WPB-82337 when commissioned. She acquired the name Point Divide in 1964 when the Coast Guard named all cutters longer than 65-foot (20 m). The Coast Guard's original intent is not clear today, but the only geographic feature currently recognized as "Point Divide" by the United States Geological Survey is at the entrance to Herendeen Bay on the Alaska Peninsula. It is possible that this is the cutter's namesake.

== Coast Guard service history ==
Point Divide was placed in commission at the Coast Guard Yard on 19 September 1962. She sailed from there to her homeport of Newport Beach, California on her own bottom, making numerous stops along the way. She transited the Panama Canal on 29 December 1962 and reached Los Angeles on 26 January 1963. Point Divide was assigned to Newport Beach, California from 1962 to 1965. In 1965, Point Divide was reassigned to Corona Del Mar, California to replace Point Marone, which was sent to Vietnam.

The large numbers of recreational boaters in Southern California involved Point Divide in a significant number of search and rescue missions. In 1965 she rescued three teenaged boys who set out on an eighteen-foot catamaran to "sail the South Seas". In 1966 she put pumps aboard the sinking sport-fishing boat Valor and towed her back to port. In 1969 two men were rescued from the water after their 24-foot sailboat capsized. Point Divide towed the sailboat back to port along with a 42-foot cabin cruiser that was disabled by engine trouble. In 1971 she pulled a grounded 28-foot motorboat into deeper water. The fishing boat Rappy II was disabled when a line wrapped around her propeller in 1973. Point Divide towed her back to harbor. In 1974, a sixteen-foot skiff with two aboard ran out of gas on a trip from Catalina Island to Long Beach and drifted all night. After they were reported missing, Point Divide located them and sold them enough gas to get back to port. The cutter averaged about fifty search and rescue missions a year.

Point Divide and Point Hubbard were assigned to Presidential Support Duty, alternating patrols off President Nixon's San Clemente retreat whenever he was in residence. Presidential security did not relieve the need to rescue boaters in trouble. The cutter rescued two crew of a Hobie Cat that capsized a quarter mile from Nixon's beach in 1972.

Point Divide was also called upon to execute a wide variety of other missions. In July 1970, she towed a dead gray whale off Salt Creek Beach so that it could sink in deep water. She hosted tours aboard as a form of public outreach. In 1984, Point Divide seized a full-size replica of HMS Bounty which was used in the film, The Bounty. The U.S. Customs Service alleged that it failed to properly clear customs on arrival in the United States. The fishing vessel Ocean Joy smuggled 415 burlap bags containing $22 million of marijuana into Los Angeles Harbor in May 1985. While officers on land seized the drugs, Point Divide chased the vessel as she returned to sea. She fired warning shots from a .50-caliber machine gun when the smugglers refused to obey verbal orders to stop. Once boarded, Point Divide's crew found that the smugglers had opened seacocks to flood and sink Ocean Joy. The flooding was stopped with assistance from USS Kincaid, the four crewmen were detained, and Ocean Joy was towed back to port.

Point Divide was decommissioned at a ceremony in Corona Del Mar on 30 March 1995. She was replaced in Corona Del Mar by Point Stuart. Ex-Point Divide was donated to the Maritime Training Center of Seattle Community College through the U.S. Maritime Administration.

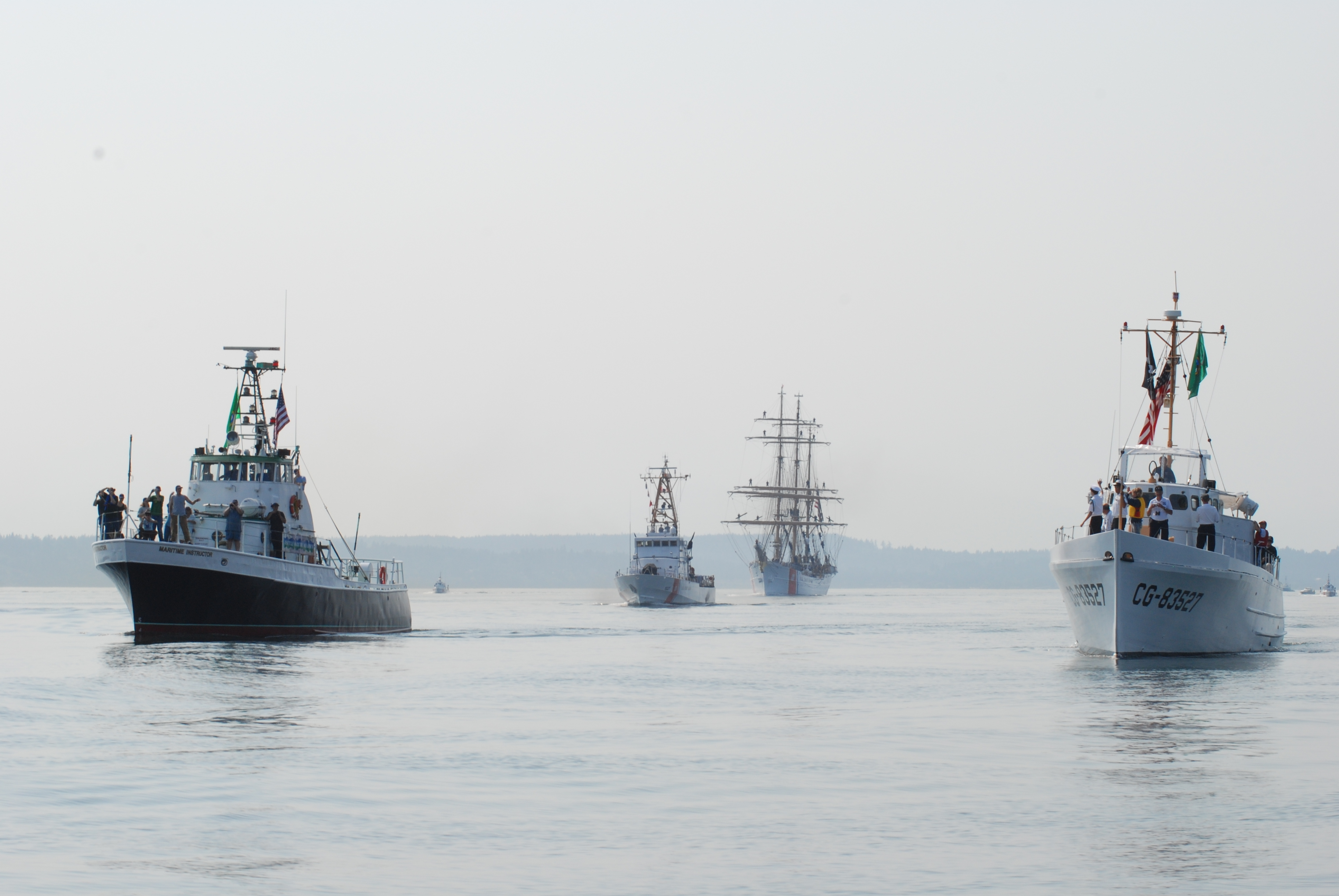
Maritime Instructor escorts USCGC Eagle into Seattle as part of the Coast Guard heritage fleet on 1 July 2008

=== Honors and awards ===
Point Divide earned two Meritorious Unit Commendations.

== Seattle Maritime Academy ==
Point Divide was renamed Maritime Instructor by her new owners at Seattle Community College. The school, reorganized as the Seattle Maritime Academy in 1997, is a unit of Seattle Central College which offers a vocational training program to prepare students for jobs in the maritime sector. Maritime Instructor is used to give students on-the-water training during their course of study.

== See also ==
- USNS Bold: Previously proposed as a SCC ship
