= USS Stalwart =

USS Stalwart may refer to the following ships operated by the United States Navy:

- USS Stalwart (AMc-105), an Acme-class coastal minesweeper later redesignated Unclassified Miscellaneous Auxiliary (IX-231); commissioned from 1942–1946.
- USS Stalwart (MSO-493), an Aggressive-class minesweeper, AM-493, redesignated ocean minesweeper (MSO-493); commissioned from 1957–1966.
- USNS Stalwart, a modified tactical auxiliary general ocean surveillance ship; commissioned from 1984–2002; as of 2006, Stalwart is a training ship owned by State University of New York Maritime College

== See also ==
- HMAS Stalwart
- RSS Stalwart
