= USNS Invincible =

Ship built in 1987

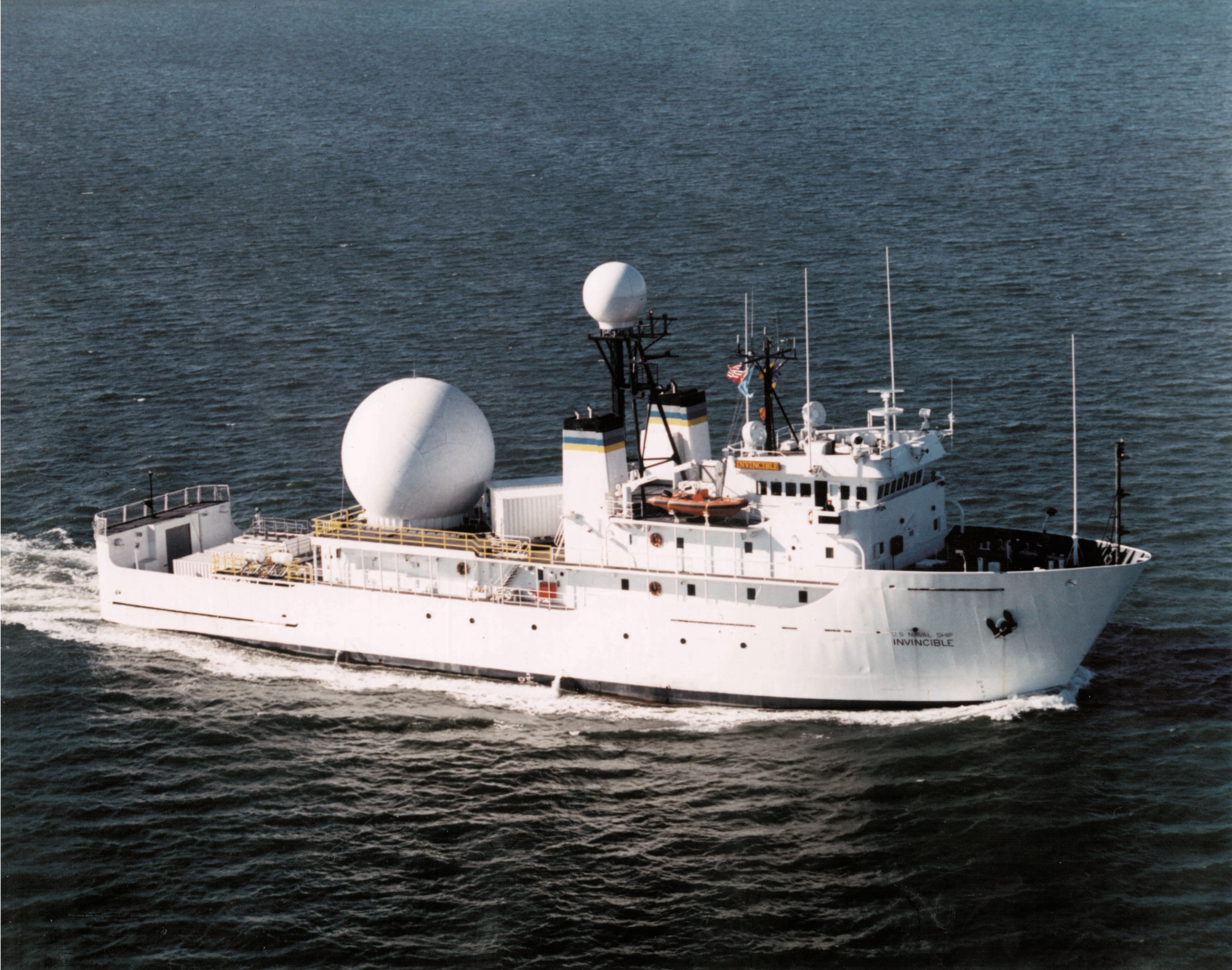
- USNS Invincible (T-AGM-24)

History

United States
- Ordered: 20 January 1982
- Builder: Tacoma Boatbuilding Company, Tacoma, Washington
- Laid down: 2 May 1986
- Launched: 8 November 1986
- In service: 30 January 1987
- Out of service: 15 December 2021
- Home port: No homeport assigned
- Identification: IMO number: 8833879; MMSI number: 338941000; Callsign: NIYJ
- Status: Deactivated

General characteristics
- Type: Tracking ship
- Displacement: 2,285 tons full load
- Length: 224 ft (68 m)
- Beam: 43 ft (13 m)
- Draught: 16 ft (4.9 m)
- Propulsion: four diesel generators, two shafts, 3,200 brake hp
- Speed: 11 knots (20 km/h; 13 mph)
- Capacity: Officers: 7; Enlisted: 13
- Complement: 18 civilians; 18 military/sponsor personnel
- Sensors & processing systems: Cobra Gemini

USNS Invincible (T-AGM-24), also known as ex-AGOS 10, is one of two tracking ships operated by the Military Sealift Command. One of the radars it carries is the Cobra Gemini dual band, X band and S band, radar.

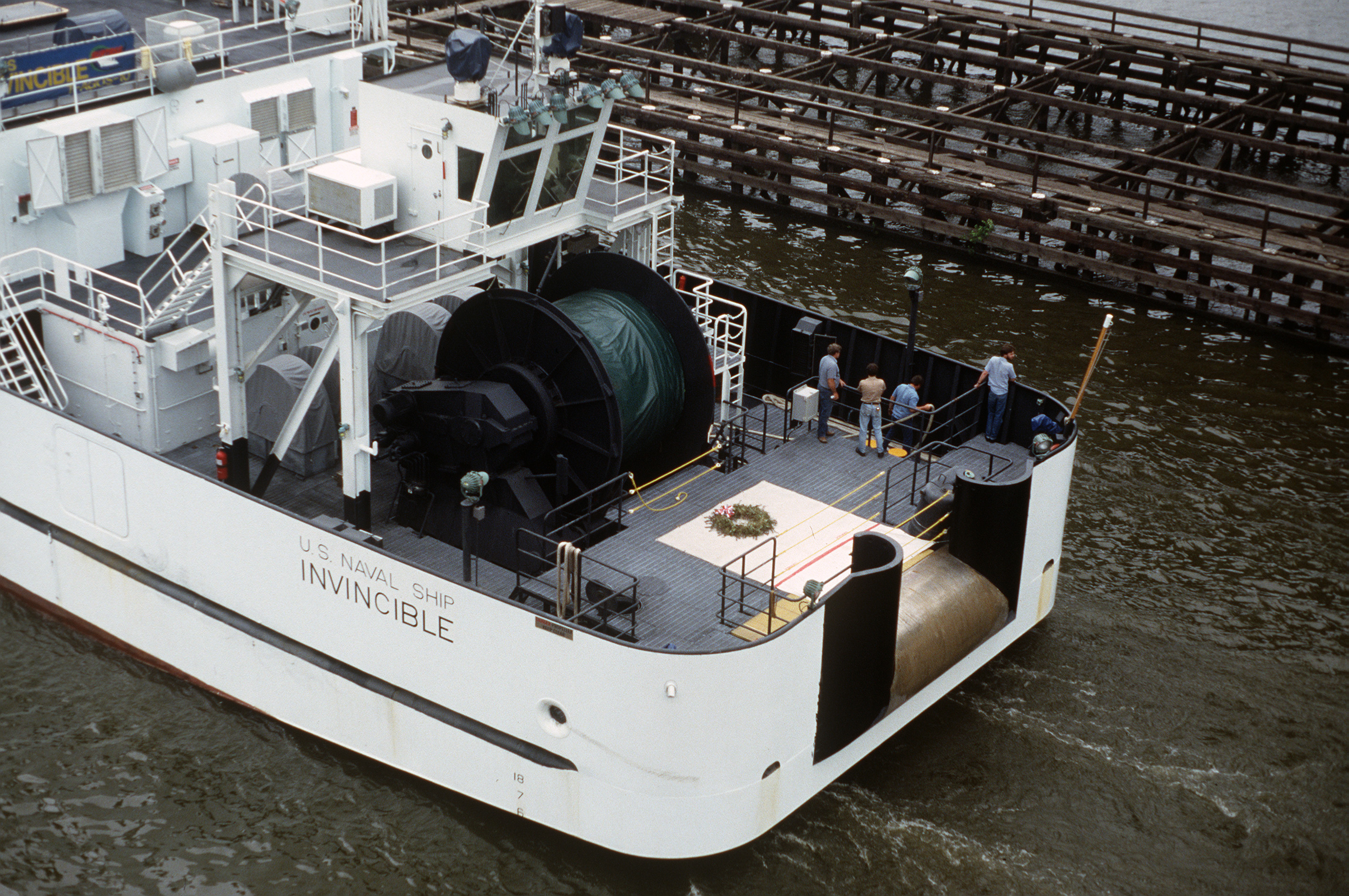
SURTASS gear on Invincible in 1987, soon after christening.

Like other members of the Stalwart class of ocean surveillance ships, the original mission of the Invincible was to patrol the oceans looking for submarines with her Surveillance Towed Array Sensor System (SURTASS), a large passive sonar array. The ship was reclassified from AGOS-10 to AGM-24 on April 4, 2000 after she was refitted as a missile range instrumentation ship. Invincible provides a platform for the Cobra Gemini dual-band radar developed by the United States Air Force to support data collection requirements on theater ballistic missiles. The Military Sealift Command retains custody for United States Air Force use for deploying a mobile surveillance and tracking radar system.

== History ==
Invincible deployed to the Persian Gulf in 2012, passing through the Strait of Hormuz on 19 May 2012 in convoy with British minesweepers. In March 2017, Invincible visited the Persian Gulf under Royal Navy escort, and was greeted by numerous IRGC fastboats which provocatively approached within 600 meters of Invincible in the Gulf of Oman.

The ship was inactivated on 15 December 2021 and the US Navy plans to repurpose it into a training vessel or store it as part of the National Defense Reserve Fleet.
