= Vindex (disambiguation) =

Vindex was a Roman governor of Gaul (modern-day France).

Vindex may also refer to:

- Vindex Toys, toy division of the National Sewing Machine Company
- HMS Vindex, Royal Navy ships
- Ruellia vindex, plant species
- Asios vindex and Phanaeus vindex, beetle species
- Vindex, a community in Garret County, Maryland, USA
- Vindex, emancipated slave of Lucius Junius Brutus
- Vindex, fictional character in the 2008 space opera Implied Spaces by Walter Jon Williams
- Julius Vindex, pseudonym of Irish political writer Denis Taaffe (1759-1813)
- Vindex, pen name of Giselher Wirsing, author of Stalinisme (1944)
- Vindex, a prophesied, antichrist-type figure in the Satanism of the Order of Nine Angles

== See also ==
- Vindicator (disambiguation) (English for Latin vindex)
- Windex
