= HMAS Stalwart =

Three ships of the Royal Australian Navy (RAN) have been named HMAS Stalwart.

- HMAS Stalwart (H14) an S-class destroyer launched in 1918, decommissioned in 1925, and scrapped in 1937
- HMAS Stalwart (D 215), a destroyer tender launched in 1966, decommissioned in 1990, and sold into civilian service
- HMAS Stalwart (A304), is a replenishment oiler, the second of the Supply class based on the Spanish Cantabria class. The keel was laid in 2018.

== See also ==
- RSS Stalwart, a frigate of the Republic of Singapore Navy.
- USS Stalwart, two ships of the United States Navy.
- USNS Stalwart (T-AGOS-1), a surveillance ship of the United States Military Sealift Command.
