= USNS Vindicator =

Stalwart-class surveillance ship

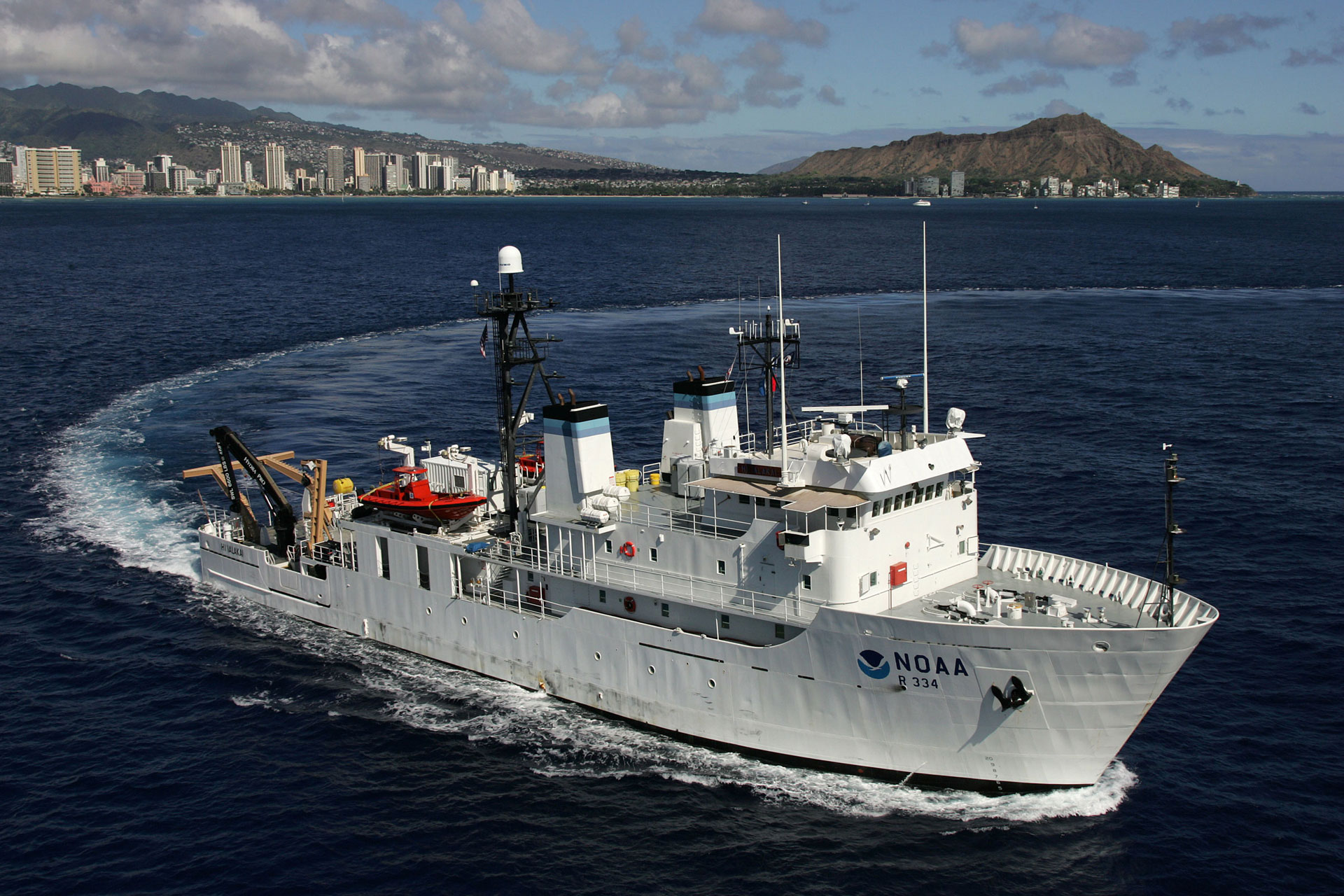
- NOAAS Hiʻialakai (R 334) off Honolulu, Hawaiʻi, sometime between 2001 and 2009

History

United States
- Name: USNS Vindicator (T-AGOS-3)
- Namesake: A vindicator is someone who justifies something by providing evidence or who maintains or defends a cause against opposition
- Operator: Military Sealift Command
- Ordered: 26 September 1980
- Builder: Tacoma Boatbuilding Company, Tacoma, Washington
- Laid down: 14 April 1983
- Launched: 1 June 1984
- Acquired: 21 November 1984 (delivered)
- In service: 21 November 1984
- Out of service: 30 June 1993
- Stricken: 30 June 1993
- Identification: IMO number: 8835619
- Fate: Transferred to U.S. Coast Guard 30 June 1993
- Acquired: Transferred from U.S. Coast Guard 2001
- Fate: Transferred to National Oceanic and Atmospheric Administration October 2001

United States
- Name: USCGC Vindicator (WMEC-3)
- Acquired: By lease from U.S. Navy 30 June 1993
- Commissioned: 20 May 1994
- Decommissioned: 19 August 1994
- Notes: In reserve 1994-1999
- Recommissioned: 24 August 1999
- Decommissioned: 1 May 2001
- Home port: Norfolk, Virginia
- Identification: IMO number: 8835619; Call sign NODF
- Fate: Returned to U.S. Navy 2001

United States
- Name: NOAAS Hiʻialakai (R 334)
- Namesake: Hiʻialakai is a Hawaiian word meaning "embracing pathways to the sea" and holding a deeper meaning of "guiding leaders of the seas"
- Acquired: Transferred from U.S. Navy October 2001
- Commissioned: 3 September 2004
- Decommissioned: 14 December 2020
- Sponsored by: Margaret "Maggie" Awamura Inouye and Isabella A. Abbott
- Home port: Pearl Harbor, Hawaiʻi
- Identification: IMO number: 8835619; MMSI number: 368926089; Callsign: WTEY
- Fate: sold by GSA auction in 2023 to private interests for future commercial use

General characteristics (as U.S. Navy ocean surveillance ship)
- Class & type: Stalwart-class ocean surveillance ship
- Displacement: 2,285 long tons
- Length: 224 ft (68 m)
- Beam: 43 ft (13 m)
- Draft: 16 ft 10 in (5.13 m)
- Propulsion: Diesel-electric: Two General Electric 800hp (597-kw) DC electric propulsion motors, twin fixed-pitch propellers
- Speed: 11 knots (20 km/h; 13 mph)
- Crew: 33 (15 U.S. Navy personnel, 15 civilians)
- Armament: none

General characteristics (as U.S. Coast Guard Cutter)
- Type: Medium endurance cutter

General characteristics (as NOAA oceanographic research ship)
- Type: oceanographic research ship
- Tonnage: 1,486 GT; 786 DWT
- Displacement: 1,650 tons (light); 2,285 tons (full load)
- Depth: 20 ft (6.1 m)
- Installed power: 1,600 horsepower (2.1 megawatts)
- Speed: 11.5 knots (21.3 km/h; 13.2 mph) (emergency); 10 knots (19 km/h; 12 mph) (cruising)
- Range: 20,232 nautical miles (37,470 km; 23,283 mi)
- Endurance: 35 days
- Boats & landing craft carried: Up to five small work boats
- Complement: 28 (6 NOAA Corps officers, 3 licensed engineers, and 19 other crew) plus up to 22 scientists
- Sensors & processing systems: Multibeam sonar; echosounder

USNS Vindicator (T-AGOS-3) was a United States Navy Stalwart-class modified tactical auxiliary general ocean surveillance ship that was in service from 1984 to 1993. Vindicator then served in the United States Coast Guard from 1994 to 2001 as the medium endurance cutter USCGC Vindicator (WMEC-3). From 2004 to 2020, she was in commission in the National Oceanic and Atmospheric Administration (NOAA) fleet as the oceanographic research ship NOAAS Hiʻialakai (R 334).

== Construction ==
Vindicator was ordered on 26 September 1980. She was laid down on 14 April 1983 by the Tacoma Boatbuilding Company, at Tacoma, Washington, and was launched on 1 June 1984. Tacoma Boatbuilding delivered her to the U.S. Navy on 21 November 1984.

== United States Navy service ==
The Navy placed the ship in non-commissioned service in the Military Sealift Command on the day of her delivery as USNS Vindicator (T-AGOS-3). Designed to collect underwater acoustical data in support of Cold War anti-submarine warfare operations using Surveillance Towed Array Sensor System (SURTASS) sonar equipment, Vindicator spent the final years of the Cold War searching for Soviet Navy submarines.

After the collapse of the Soviet Union at the end of December 1991 brought the Cold War to an end, the requirement for such search operations declined. On 30 June 1993, the Navy removed Vindicator from service and simultaneously struck her from the Naval Vessel Register and leased her to the United States Coast Guard.

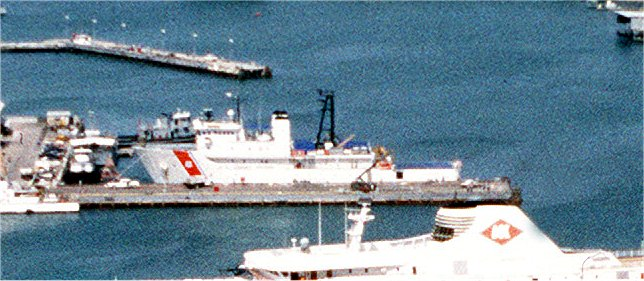
USCGC Vindicator (WMEC-3) in port at Norfolk, Virginia, on 26 July 1994.

== United States Coast Guard service ==
With their own ship moored at the United States Coast Guard Yard at Curtis Bay in Baltimore, Maryland, from June to October 1993, the crew of the U.S. Coast Guard medium endurance cutter USCGC Tamaroa (WMEC-166) reported aboard Vindicator for her Coast Guard acceptance trials. Vindicator was commissioned into Coast Guard service on 20 May 1994 as the medium endurance cutter USCGC Vindicator (WMEC-3) for use in counternarcotics operations, based in Norfolk, Virginia, and serving as a "mother ship" for 38-foot (12 m) pursuit boats used to intercept drug smugglers. During 1994, crewed by many former sailors of the by-then-decommissioned Tamaroa, Vindicator took part in Operation Able Manner, a joint U.S. Coast Guard-U.S. Navy effort to interdict would-be Haitian migrants to the United States. She was decommissioned on 19 August 1994 and placed in reserve at the Coast Guard Yard at Curtis Bay.

After five years of inactivity, Vindicator was recommissioned on 24 August 1999. At one point, she was under evaluation to be a test ship for a Marine Molten Carbonate Fuel Cell Demonstration Module. The Coast Guard found that Vindicator and five other Stalwart-class ships the Navy had transferred were inadequate as Coast Guard cutters because of their inability to carry helicopters and low top speed, and budget limitations prevented the Coast Guard from addressing these shortfalls. Budget cuts in early 2001 resulted in termination of the lease, and she was decommissioned again on 1 May 2001 and returned to the Military Sealift Command.

== National Oceanic and Atmospheric Administration service ==
=== Transfer and commissioning ===
In October 2001, Vindicator was transferred to the National Oceanic and Atmospheric Administration (NOAA). After a $4,000,000 conversion into an oceanographic research ship, she was commissioned into NOAA service on 3 September 2004 as NOAAS Hiʻialakai (R 334), co-sponsored by Margaret "Maggie" Awamura Inouye, the wife of United States Senator from Hawaiʻi Daniel Inouye, and University of Hawaiʻi Professor Emerita Isabella A. Abbott.

=== Capabilities ===
Hiʻialakai was equipped with multibeam sonar and echosounder equipment for underwater mapping work. She was well equipped to support both shallow- and deep-water dive projects. She was able to carry up to five small work boats for transporting divers to and from working areas, multiple dive lockers to store scientific gear and equipment, a membrane Nitrox fill system for filling dive tanks, and a three-person, double-lock decompression chamber.

Hiʻialakai had a wet laboratory with a scientific freezer, a dry laboratory, and a computer and electronics laboratory. On deck, she had a 46-foot (14 m) telescoping boom with a lifting capacity of 6,600 pounds (3,000 kg) at full extension, an A-frame with a maximum safe working load of 22,000 pounds (10,000 kg), and a J-frame with a maximum safe working load of 3,500 pounds (1,600 kg). Her normal complement of boats consisted of a 29-foot (8.8 m) boat with a 455-horsepower (339 kW) diesel motor and a capacity of 10 people, a 26-foot (7.9 m) boat with a 210-horsepower (160 kW) diesel motor and a capacity of 10 people, a 17-foot (5.2 m) boat with a 90-horsepower (67 kW) outboard motor and a capacity of five people, and an 18-foot (5.5 m) SOLAS-approved rescue boat with a 90-horsepower (67 kW) outboard motor and a capacity of seven people.

In addition to her crew of 28, Hiʻialakai could accommodate up to 22 scientists.

=== Career ===
Hiʻialakai was home-ported at Pearl Harbor, Hawaiʻi. She operated in the Hawaiian Islands and the Pacific Insular Area, which includes American Samoa, the Commonwealth of the Northern Mariana Islands, and Guam. Her first cruise in NOAA service – to support assessment, monitoring, and mapping in the Northwestern Hawaiian Islands at Nīhoa, Necker Island (also known as Mokumanamana), the French Frigate Shoals (also known as Kānemilohaʻi), the Gardner Pinnacles (also known as Pūhāhonu), Maro Reef (also known as Nalukākala), Laysan (also known as Kauō), Lisianski Island (also known as Papaʻāpoho) and the surrounding Neva Shoals, Pearl and Hermes Atoll (also known as Holoikauaua), Kure Atoll (also known as Mokupāpapa and as Ocean Island), and Midway Atoll (also known as Pihemanu Kauihelani) – began on 13 September 2004.

Hiʻialakai supported the research of NOAA's National Ocean Service, National Marine Sanctuaries, National Marine Fisheries Service, and Office of Oceanic and Atmospheric Research, as well as that of the United States Fish and Wildlife Service and the University of Hawaiʻi. She conducted coral reef ecosystem mapping, bio-analysis assessments, coral reef health studies, and fish stock studies. Her coral reef mapping supported a mapping effort initiated in 2002 by the United States Coral Reef Task Force. She carried out most of her dive-intensive operations in the Northwestern Hawaiian Islands, which became the Papahanaumokuakea Marine National Monument, one of the largest marine conservation areas in the world, in 2006.

In 2008, maritime archeologists embarked aboard Hiʻialakai discovered the wreck of a sailing ship in the French Frigate Shoals which turned out to be that of the 19th-century whaling ship Two Brothers.

Hiʻialakai made her longest cruise — a 103-day voyage — during a 2015 assessment of coral reefs in the National Marine Sanctuary of American Samoa. Her divers conducted 3,500 dives, using all three of her boats, during this voyage.

After discovering that Hiʻialakai was suffering from extensive corrosion, NOAA decided to retire her early. She was decommissioned on 14 December 2020.

The vessel was sold by the GSA in 2023 through auction to private commercial interests and as of early 2026 the vessel is moored in Port Angeles, Washington awaiting being refitted and returned to service.
