= USAV Spearhead =

USAV Spearhead may refer to the following vessels operated by the United States military:

- USAV Spearhead (TSV-1X), is the first ship of the US Army's theater support vessel program (TSV). The Army leased Spearhead from Australian fast ferry builder Incat in October 2002
- USAV Spearhead (JHSV-1), is a Joint High Speed Vessel. Her keel was laid down in July 2010 and she entered service in December 2012
