= Stalwart-class ocean surveillance ship =

1984 class of American research vessels

Stalwart class
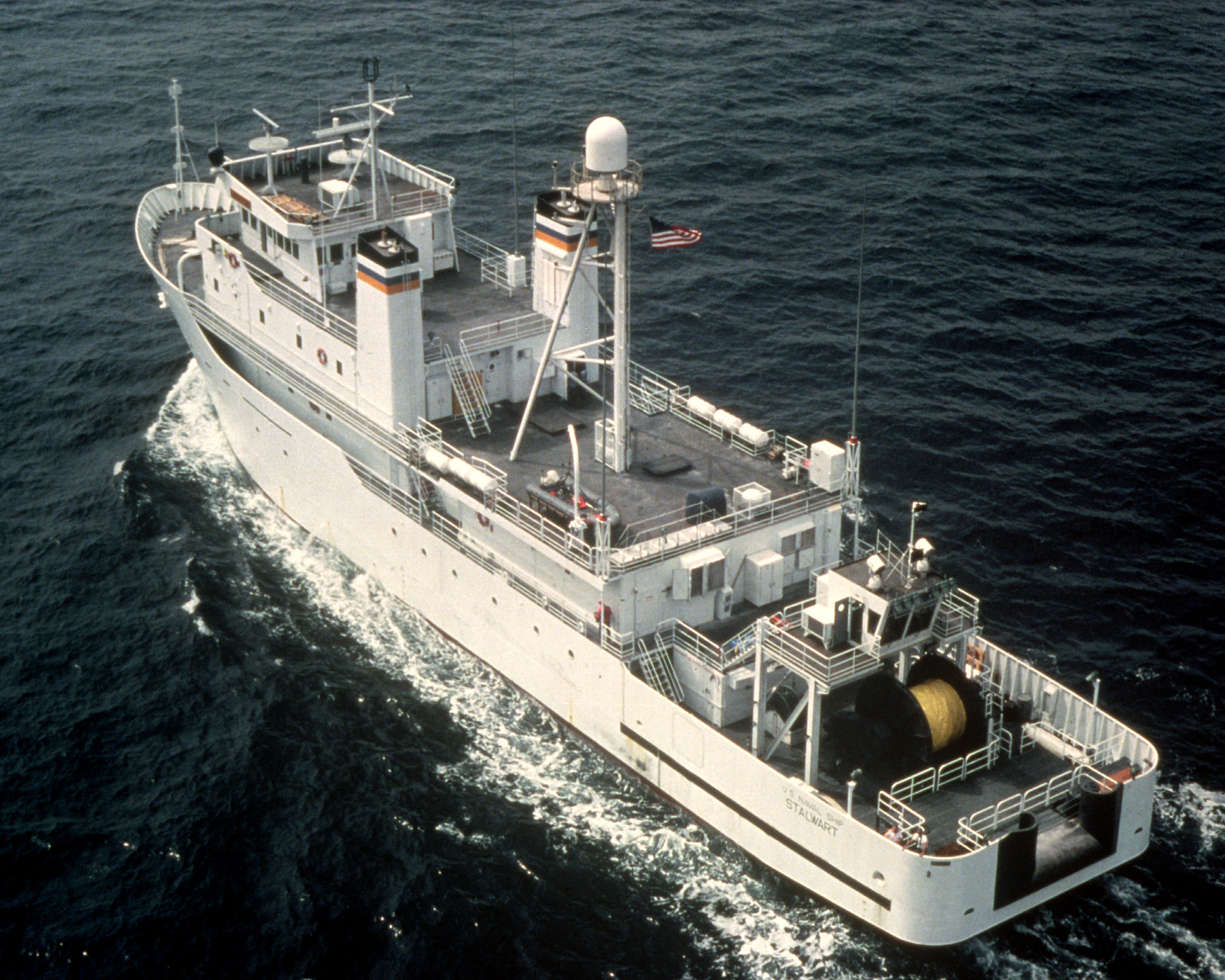
- USNS Stalwart

Class overview
- Builders: 1–12: Tacoma Boatbuilding Company, Tacoma, Washington; 13–18: VT Halter Marine, Inc., Moss Point, Mississippi
- Operators: United States Navy; Portugal; New Zealand
- Preceded by: None
- Succeeded by: Victorious class
- In service: April 12, 1984
- Completed: 18
- Scrapped: 1

General characteristics
- Displacement: 1,565 t.(lt) 2,535 t.(fl)
- Length: 224 ft (68 m)
- Beam: 43 ft (13 m)
- Draft: 15 ft (4.6 m)
- Propulsion: diesel-electric, two shafts, 1,600 hp (1,200 kW)
- Speed: 11 knots (20 km/h; 13 mph)
- Complement: 36

The Stalwart-class auxiliary general ocean surveillance ships (T-AGOS) are a class of United States Naval Ship (USNS) auxiliary support ocean surveillance ships commissioned between April 1984 and October 2000. Their original purpose was to collect underwater acoustical information using the Surveillance Towed Array Sensor System (SURTASS), a towed array passive sonar.

Stalwart, Indomitable, and Capable were modified to support narcotics interdiction by removing SURTASS equipment and adding an air-search radar and tactical data link equipment.

== Units ==
Ship Name	Hull No.	Delivery- Stricken	Fate	Link
Stalwart	1	1984–2002	2026 survey ship OCEAN STALWART	NVR NavSource
Contender	2	1984–1992	T/V General Rudder, flagship and training vessel of the Texas A&M University at Galveston	NVR NavSource
Vindicator	3	1984–1993	Later USCGC Vindicator (WMEC-3) (1994-2001), then NOAAS Hiʻialakai (R 334) (2004-2020). Sold by GSA to private interests in 2023 and pending return to service	NVR NavSource NOAA
Triumph	4	1985–1995	Stricken, to be disposed of in support of Fleet training exercise	NVR NavSource
Assurance	5	1985–1995	Transferred to Portugal as NRP Almirante Gago Coutinho (A523)	NVR NavSource
Persistent	6	1985–1995	T/S State of Michigan, Great Lakes Maritime Academy, Traverse City, Michigan	NVR NavSource NMC
Indomitable	7	1985–2002	now private ocean expedition and dive support vessel DAGON	NVR NavSource NOAA
Prevail	8	1986–	Reclassified as Unclassified miscellaneous vessel Prevail (IX-537)	NVR NVR NavSource
Assertive	9	1986–2004	scrapped in 2024	NVR NavSource
Invincible	10	1987–2021	Converted to T-AGM 24, Missile Range Instrumentation Ship	NVR NavSource MSC
Audacious	11	1989–1997	Transferred to Portugal as NRP Dom Carlos I (A522)	NVR NavSource
Vigorous, renamed Bold	12	1989–2004	today operates as survey vessel Bold Explorer	NVR NavSource EPA
Adventurous	13	1988–1992	NOAA Oscar Elton Sette (R-335)	NVR NavSource NOAA
Worthy	14	1988–1993	Transferred to USGS, then to the US Army. Converted to a Missile Range Instrumentation Ship at Kwajalein Atoll's Ronald Reagan Ballistic Missile Defense Test Site	NVR NavSource KMRSS
Titan	15	1989–1993	today in commercial service as Ocean Titan	NVR NavSource NOAA
Capable	16	1989–2004	NOAA Okeanos Explorer (R-337)	NVR NavSource NOAA
Tenacious	17	1987–1997	Today operates as commercial survey vessel Geo Resolution	NVR NavSource
Relentless	18	1990–1993	NOAA Gordon Gunter (R-336)	NVR NavSource NOAA
