= Fred Stallard =

English footballer

Fred Stallard (1938/1939 – June 1991) was an English footballer who played as a goalkeeper for Derry City and for the Irish Football League in representative inter-league matches. He joined Derry City on 3 January 1959 while serving in the RAF stationed at their Ballykelly base. He represented the Irish League against the English Football League on 1 November 1961 at Windsor Park, Belfast, which finished as a 6–1 defeat, and remained as Derry City's first-choice goalkeeper until the end of the 1962–63 season when he returned to England.
