= Vindication =

Vindication may refer to:

- Vindication (horse) (2000–2008), American thoroughbred race horse
- Vindication (Crease album) (2000), third album of US hard rock band Crease
- Vindication (Susperia album) (2002), second album of Norwegian black metal band Susperia
- Vindication (film), 2008 film written and directed by Bart Mastronardi
- Vindication (American TV series)
- Vindication Island, small island in the southern Atlantic Ocean

== See also ==
- Vindicated (disambiguation)
