= USNS Assertive =

American research vessel of the United States Navy

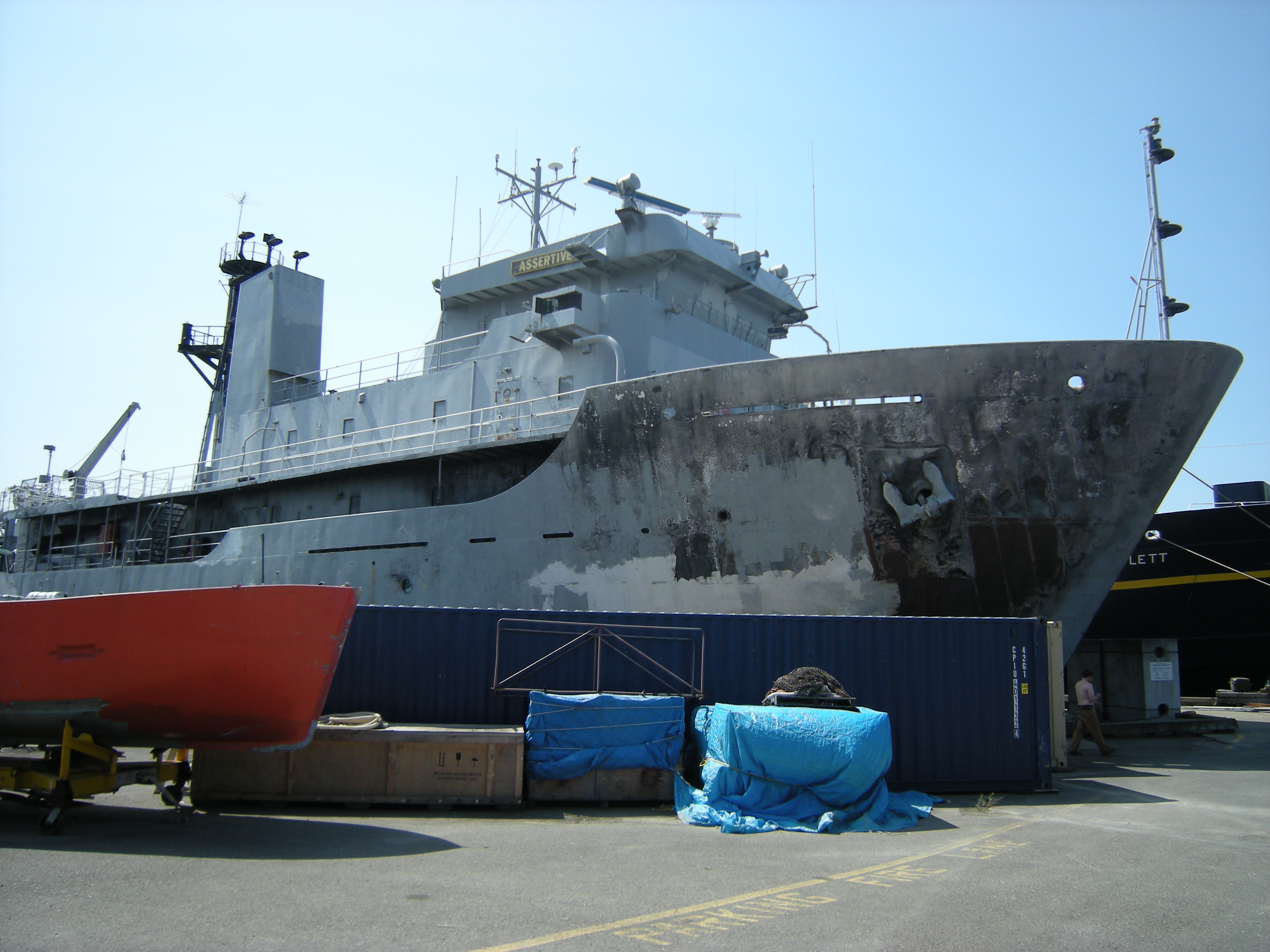
- Assertive at Seattle Maritime Academy, 2009

History

United States
- Ordered: 20 January 1982
- Builder: Tacoma Boatbuilding Company
- Laid down: 30 July 1985
- Launched: 20 June 1986
- Acquired: 9 September 1986
- Stricken: 3 March 2004
- Identification: IMO number: 8835504; Callsign: NAFY
- Status: Transferred to Seattle Maritime Academy 17 December 2008

General characteristics
- Class & type: Stalwart-class ocean surveillance ship
- Displacement: 2535 tons
- Length: 224 ft (68 m)
- Beam: 43 ft (13 m)
- Draft: 15 ft (4.6 m)
- Propulsion: Diesel Electric
- Complement: Officers: 7; Enlisted: 13

USNS Assertive (T-AGOS-9) was a Stalwart-class Modified Tactical Auxiliary General Ocean Surveillance Ship of the United States Navy.

NOAA acquired ex-USNS Assertive from the United States Navy on 31 March 2004, intending to replace NOAA David Starr Jordan R444 after the Assertive underwent a conversion for research use to be completed by 2008. The planned NOAA conversion was never carried out because a study conducted by NOAA determined that building a new ship was more cost effective than converting the Assertive and on December 11, 2008 title was transferred from NOAA to MARAD, then transferred on December 17, 2008 from MARAD to the Seattle Maritime Academy.

The Seattle Maritime Academy intended to utilize the ship for 30-day at-sea training cruises during the summer months. During the rest of the year, the Assertive would be a dock side engineering laboratory. As of Summer 2009 the Assertive was off limits to students at SMA. Inspection by instructors and students shows that critical electrical systems are missing and shore power is limited to a section of the engine room. Sea birds have made a home in the bridge area. As of October 2012, the Assertive has been listed for sale.
