= USNS Bold =

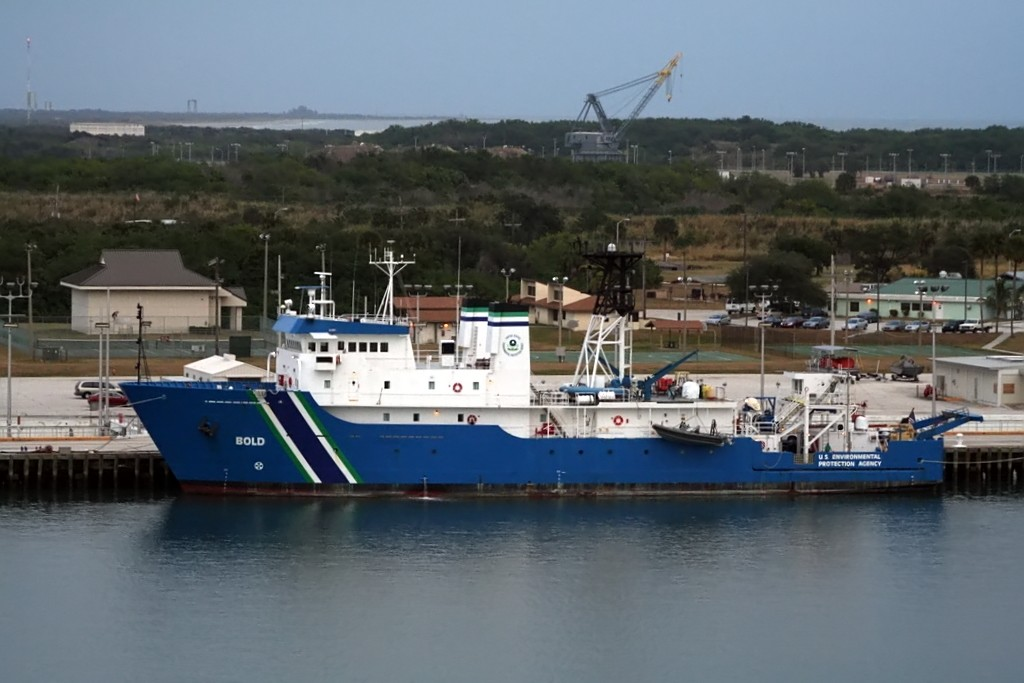
- OSV Bold docked in Port Canaveral, Florida.

History

United States
- Ordered: 30 September 1987
- Builder: Tacoma Boatbuilding Company
- Laid down: 13 June 1988
- Launched: 24 May 1989
- Acquired: 16 October 1989
- Stricken: 3 March 2004
- Identification: IMO number: 8835085; MMSI number: 367839000; Callsign: WAA2245
- Fate: Transferred to the EPA

General characteristics
- Class & type: Stalwart-class ocean surveillance ship
- Displacement: 2500 tons
- Length: 224 ft (68 m)
- Draft: 15 feet
- Propulsion: Diesel Electric
- Speed: 11 knots (20 km/h; 13 mph)
- Complement: 19 crew, 20 scientists
- Sensors & processing systems: underwater video, sidescan sonar, and general sampling instruments such as corers, dredges, and trawls

The Ocean Survey Vessel (OSV) Bold was operated by the United States Environmental Protection Agency (EPA). Originally commissioned as the USNS Vigorous, it was renamed USNS Bold (T-AGOS-12) and was a Stalwart-class Auxiliary General Ocean Surveillance ship of the Military Sealift Command of the United States Navy, as designated by the "T" preface to her AGOS classification. Stalwart-class ships were originally designed to collect underwater acoustical data in support of Cold War anti-submarine warfare operations in the 1980s.

The ship was transferred to the EPA on March 31, 2004. The ship is equipped with sidescan sonar, underwater video, water and sediment sampling instruments in study of ocean and coastline. One of the major missions of the Bold is to monitor sites where materials are dumped from dredging operations in U.S. ports for ecological impact. In 2013, the Bold was awarded to Seattle Central Community College (SCCC) by the General Services Administration. SCCC demonstrated in a competition that they would put it to the highest and best purpose, and acquired the ship at a cost of $5,000.

However, by 2015 SCCC had failed to develop the plans for the Bold which they had pledged to the GSA to implement and as such GSA placed the ship for sale to the general public. By the middle of the year the ship was auctioned to an undisclosed party who moved the ship to Lake Union Drydock in Seattle for layberthing.

Bold was converted to perform geophysical and geotechnical survey work in Singapore in 2020. In April 2020, it began operating as R/V Bold Explorer for EGS Survey.

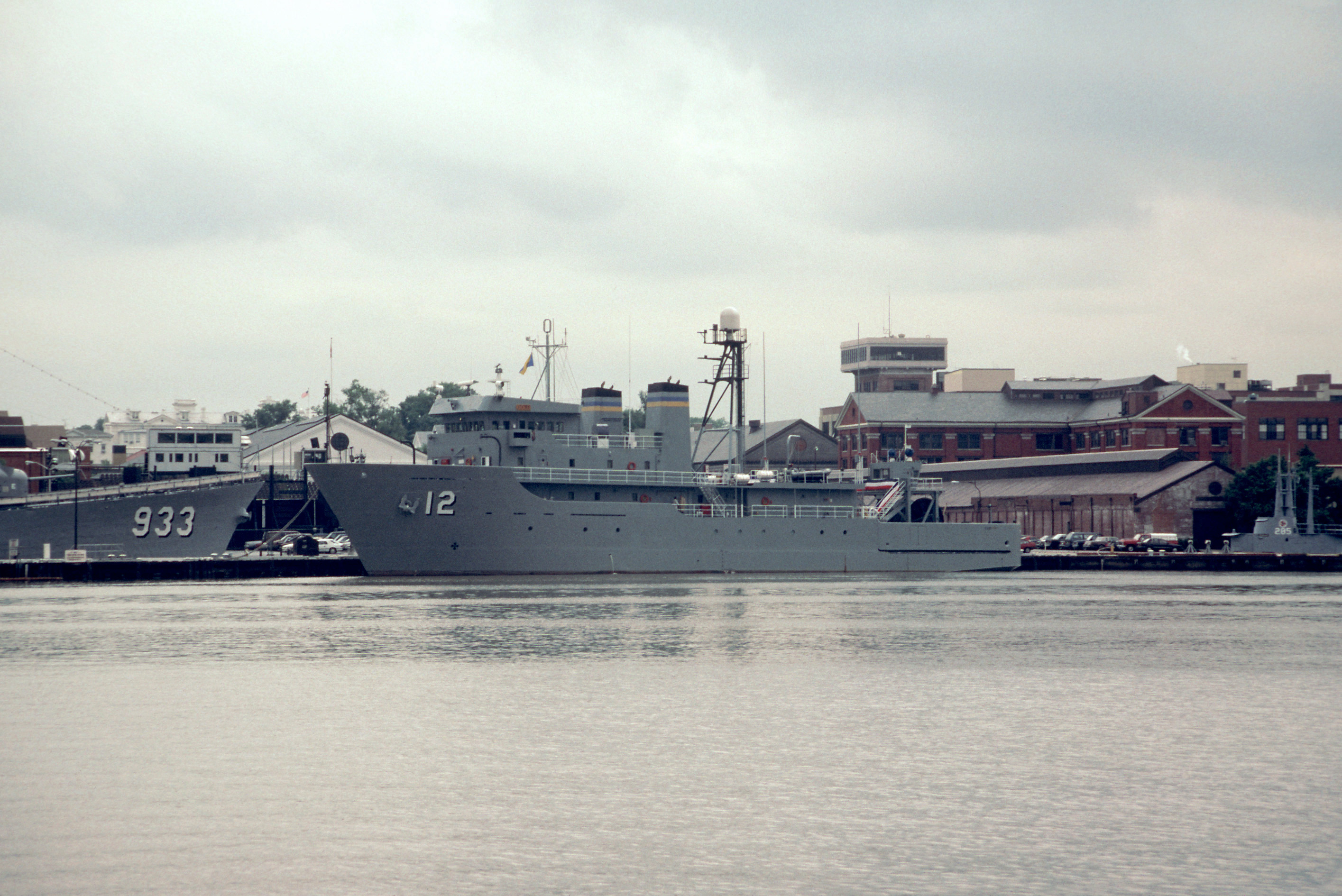
USNS Bold (T-AGOS-12) at the Washington Navy Yard

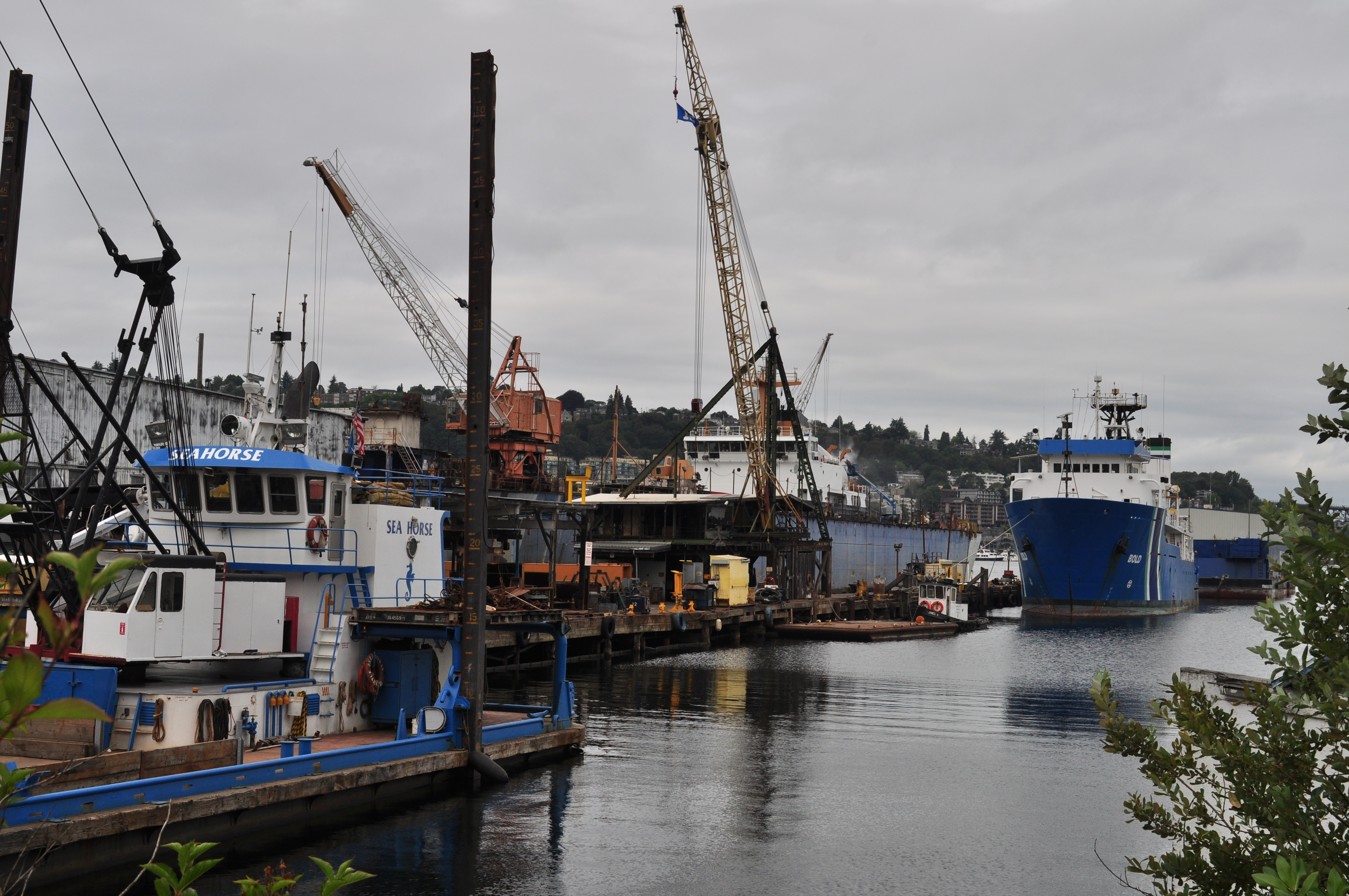
Bold at Lake Union Drydock in 2015

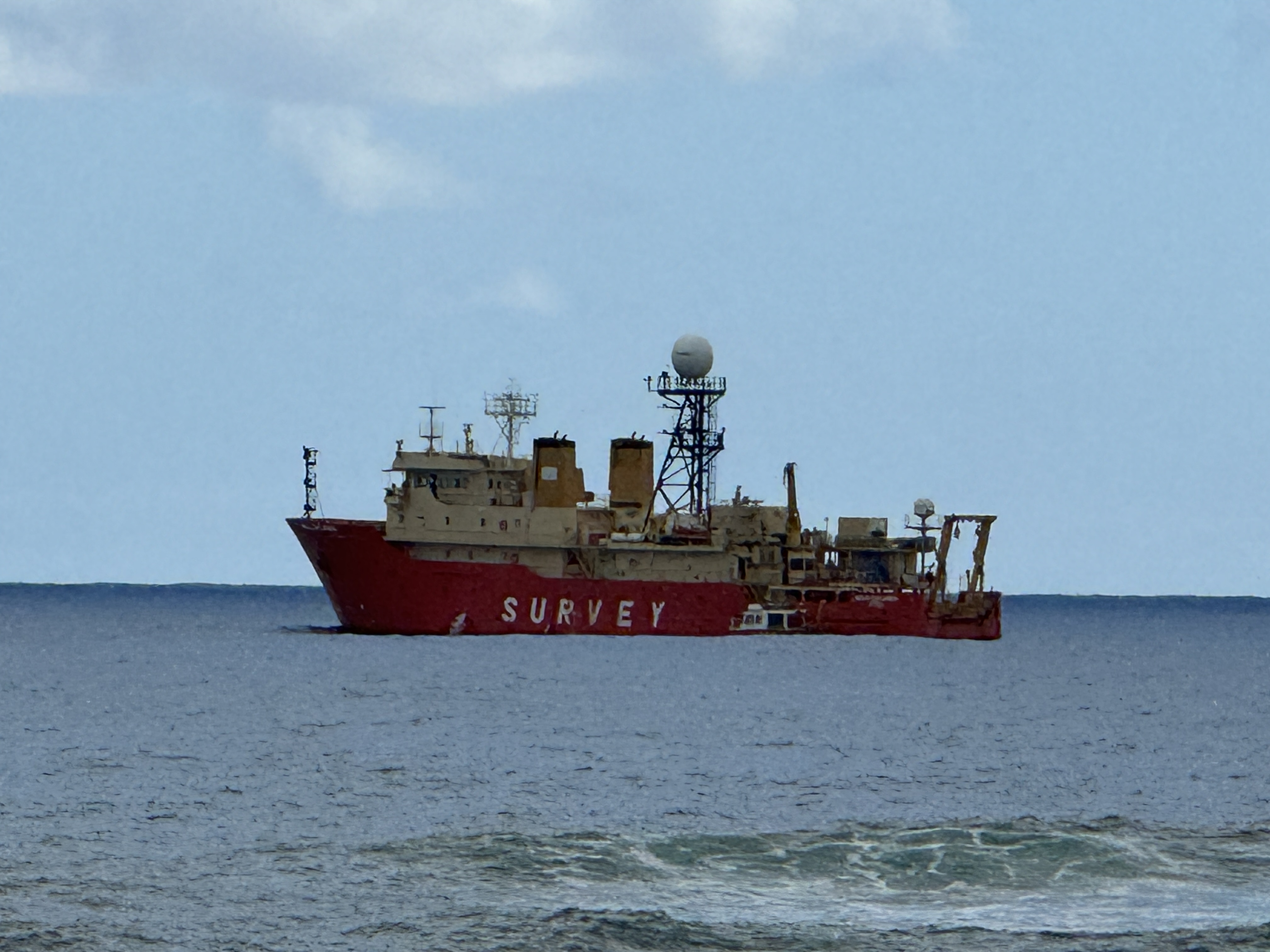
Bold Explorer off Kauai, 25 December 2023

== See also ==
- USCGC Point Divide: educational ship at SCU
