= USNS Stalwart =

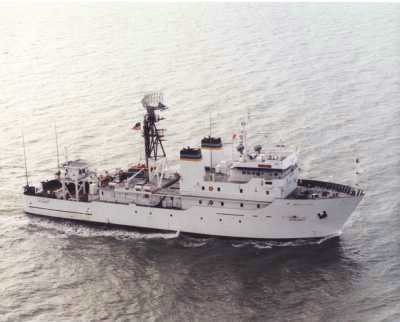
- USNS Stalwart

History

United States
- Name: Stalwart
- Ordered: 26 September 1980
- Builder: Tacoma Boatbuilding Company, Tacoma, Washington
- Laid down: 3 November 1982
- Launched: 11 July 1983
- Acquired: 14 May 2004
- In service: 12 April 1984
- Out of service: 15 November 2002
- Stricken: 2 December 2002
- Fate: Donated to State University of New York Maritime College

History

United States
- Name: SUNY Maritime
- Operator: State University of New York Maritime College
- Out of service: February 3, 2011
- Reclassified: Training vessel
- Home port: Fort Schuyler, NY
- Identification: IMO number: 8835516; MMSI number: 576785000; Callsign: YJRG8
- Fate: Sold, Stabbert Marine

General characteristics
- Class & type: Stalwart-class ocean surveillance ship
- Displacement: 1,565 tons (light); 2,535 tons (full load)
- Length: 224 ft (68 m)
- Beam: 43 ft (13 m)
- Draft: 15 ft (4.6 m)
- Propulsion: 4 x Caterpillar diesel-electric engines, two shafts, 1,600 hp
- Speed: 11 knots (20 km/h)
- Complement: 17 CIVMAR, 15 MILDET
- Sensors & processing systems: Surveillance Towed Array Sensor System (later removed); AN/SPS-49 air search radar (installed later); Link 11 system (installed later); Identification friend or foe with AUTO-ID
- Notes: Statistics during military service

USNS Stalwart (T-AGOS-1) was a Modified Tactical Auxiliary General Ocean Surveillance Ship and the lead ship of her class.

Stalwart was laid down on 3 November 1982 by the Tacoma Boat Building Company. She was launched on 11 July 1983 and entered service with the United States Military Sealift Command on 12 April 1984. The ship served as an anti-submarine surveillance ship during the Cold War, then as an anti-drug smuggling vessel as part of the United States' war on drugs.

Stalwart left military service on 15 November 2002, and was struck from the Naval Vessel Register on 2 December 2002. She was donated to the State University of New York Maritime College (SUNY-Maritime), and was renamed SUNY Maritime. She was sold in 2011 to Stabbert Maritime and sent to Norfolk Shipyards for restoration and renamed R/V Ocean Stalwart.

== Design and construction ==
Stalwart was laid down on 3 November 1982 by the Tacoma Boatbuilding Company, in Tacoma, Washington. She was launched on 11 July 1983, and entered service with the United States Military Sealift Command on 12 April 1984.

Stalwart and her sister ships were designed to collect underwater acoustical data in support of Cold War anti-submarine warfare operations in the 1980s. The main equipment used for this role was the Surveillance Towed Array Sensor System (SURTASS), a collection of acoustic sensors that process and transmit data by satellite to shore bases for in-depth analysis. SURTASS was a neutrally buoyant, 8,575-foot (2,614 m) array deployed on a 6,000 feet (1,800 m) tow cable, capable of operating between 500 and 1,500 feet (150 and 460 m) in depth.

== Operating history ==
=== Military Sealift Command ===
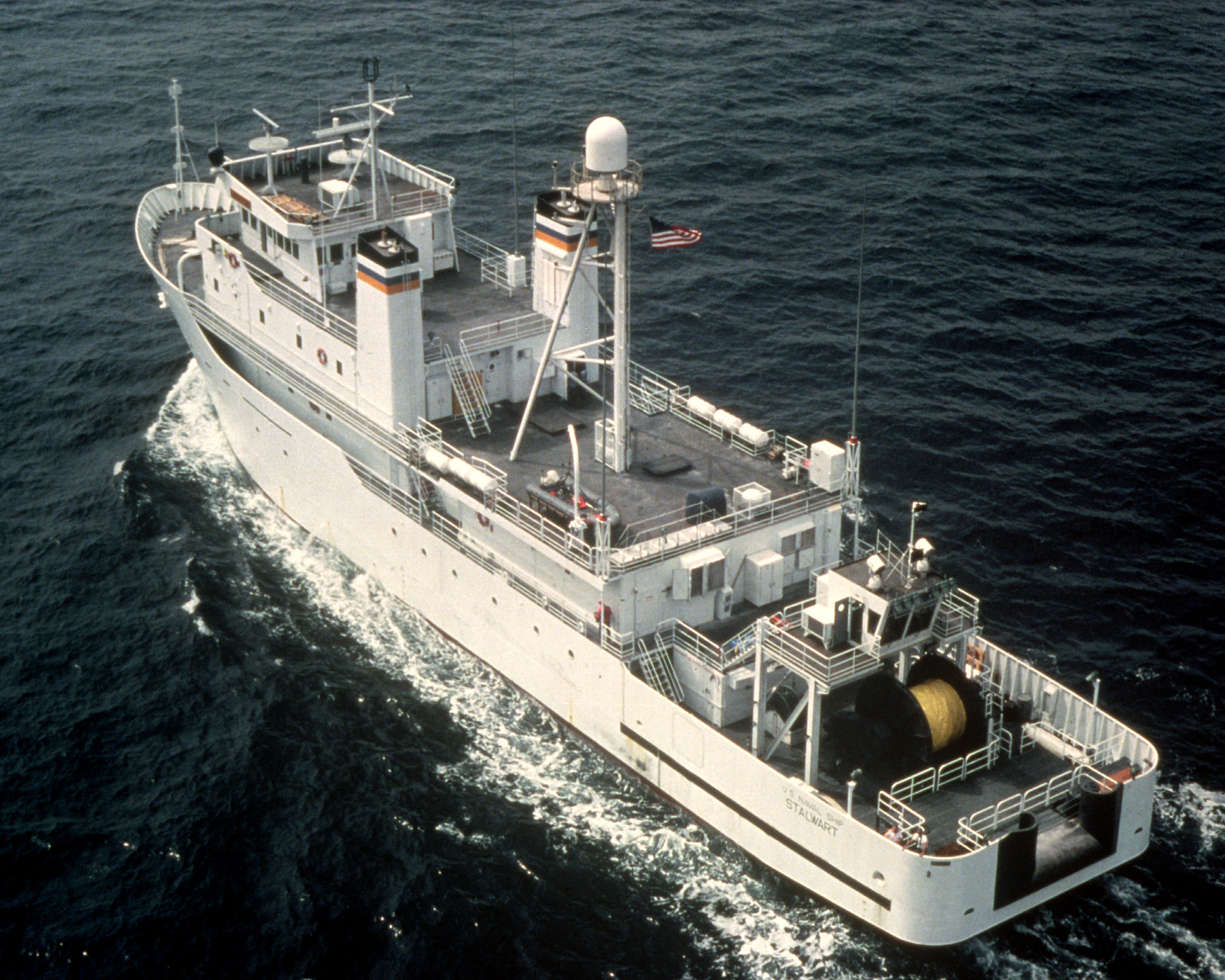
USNS Stalwart as originally configured. Aft view of equipment for the Surveillance Towed-Array Sensor System (SURTASS), 1986

Stalwart spent the first part of her career on patrol for Soviet Navy submarines.

In 1993, Stalwart and two sister ships, USNS Indomitable and USNS Capable, were converted to serve in the war on drugs under Joint Interagency Task Force – East. The SURTASS sensors were replaced by an AN/SPS-49 long range air search radar and Link 11 system, to aid in location of drug smugglers.

Stalwart left military service on 15 November 2002, and was struck from the Naval Vessel Register on 2 December 2002.

=== SUNY-Maritime ===
After she was struck from the Naval Vessel Register, Stalwart was placed under the control of the U.S. Maritime Administration, who then donated her to SUNY-Maritime for potential use in small vessel operations, watch standing and training. The vessel has also been used in recent years by various federal, state and local groups for practical training in firefighting, search and rescue, and port security.

Initial thoughts of upgrading the vessel to an operational training vessel, or to use the vessel solely as a mobile security asset were not practical for the college, despite some efforts in procuring funding for these purposes. Instead the vessel had been used to a limited extent in her current condition and by various external groups, all with the college's support. Although initially on her transfer to the Maritime College, some work was done on main engines and ship's systems, there had been no later attempts at restoring the vessel and the college sought options of disposing of the vessel, for either scrap value or other purposes.

=== Stabbert Maritime ===
On 3 February 2011, the USNS Stalwart left the SUNY Maritime pier by tugboat to be brought to Norfolk Shipyards to be restored at an estimated $14 million to Stabbert Maritime. Vessel is now R/V Ocean Stalwart. Refit entailed reinstatement of ABS class, complete redesign of interior layout with special emphases on increased laboratory space, renewed all systems, installation of DP1 dynamic positioning system and full ocean depth multibeam capability for deep sea ocean research operations.

== Gallery ==
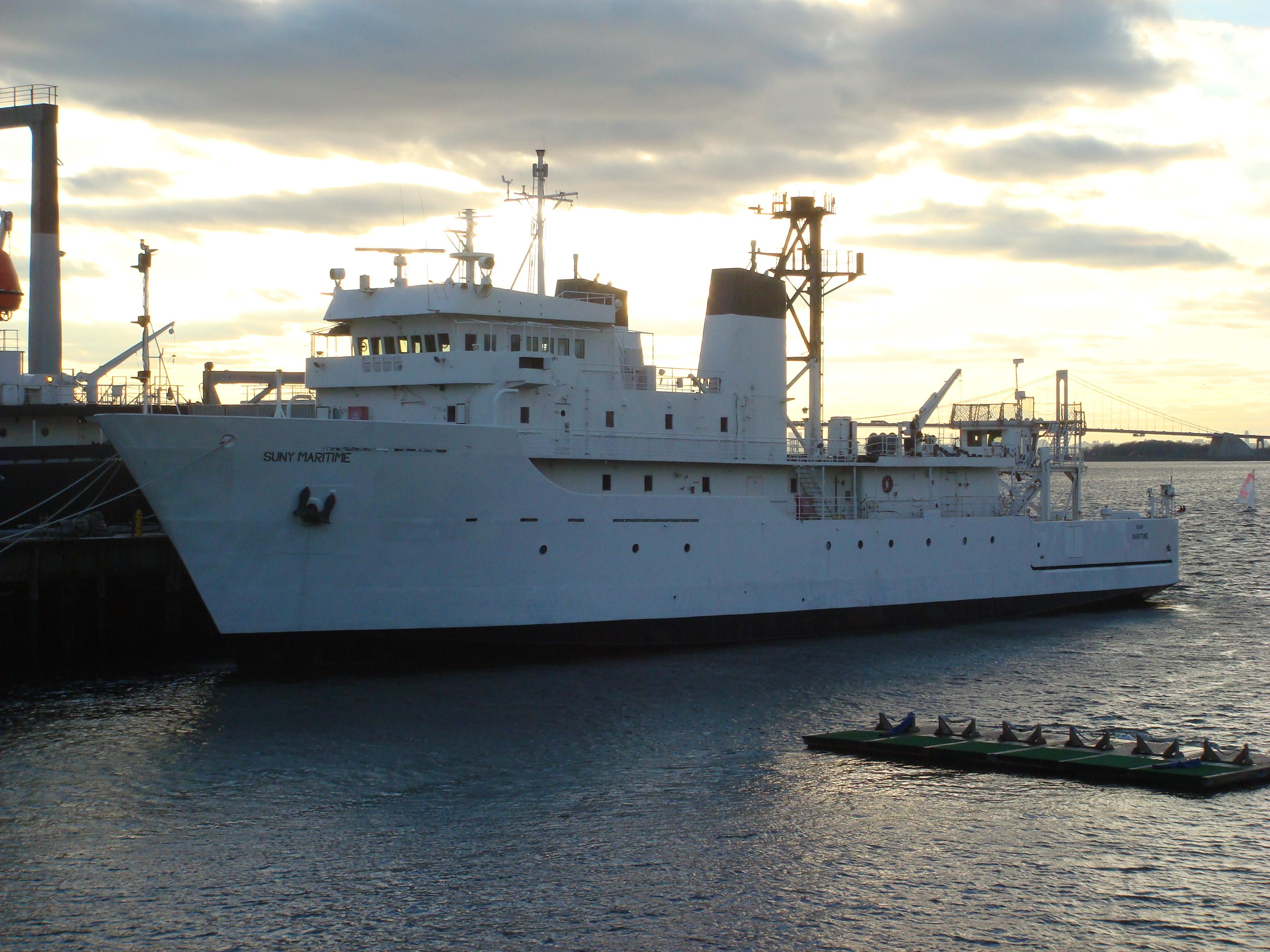
ex-USNS Stalwart during service at SUNY Maritime
