= USS Vindicator (1863) =

Gunboat of the United States Navy

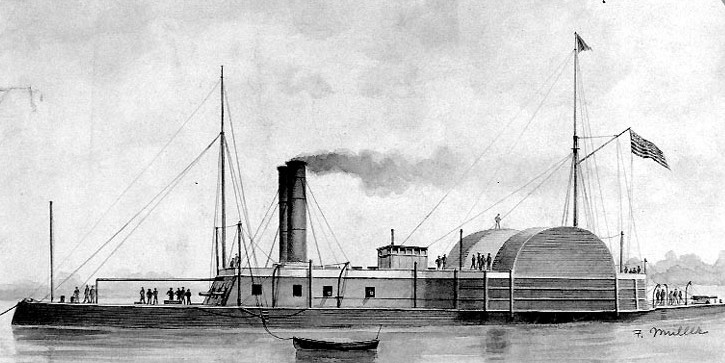
- Sepia wash drawing by F. Muller, circa 1900, depicting USS Vindicator on the Western Rivers during the Civil War.

History

United States
- Acquired: 1864
- Commissioned: 24 May 1864
- Decommissioned: circa 24 April 1865
- Fate: Sold, 29 November 1865 at Mound City, Illinois

General characteristics
- Displacement: 750 tons
- Length: 147 ft (45 m)
- Beam: 36 ft (11 m)
- Draught: 6 ft (1.8 m)
- Propulsion: steam engine; side wheel-propelled
- Speed: 12 MPH
- Armament: ram; one 100-pounder Parrott rifle; two 24-pounder howitzers; one 12-pounder rifle; one heavy 12-pounder gun

USS Vindicator was a 750-ton steamer acquired by the U.S. Navy and put to use by the Union during the American Civil War.

Vindicator served the Union Navy primarily as a ram on the Mississippi River and its tributaries as part of the Union effort to control the Mississippi River and, essentially, divide the Confederate States of America in half. Vindicator was also equipped by the Navy as a gunboat with a number of powerful guns installed on board.

== Service history ==
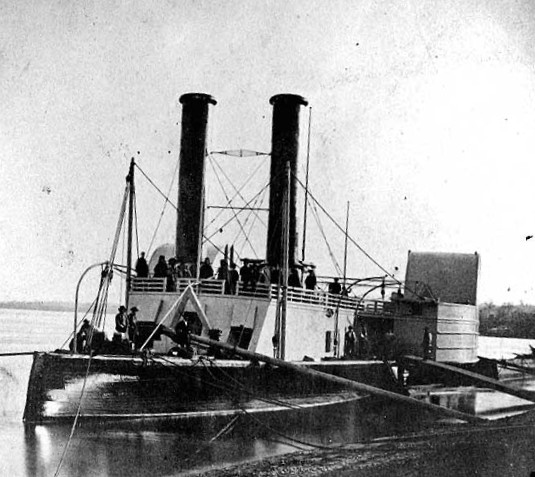
USS Vindicator photographed on the Western Rivers in 1864–1865

Vindicator—originally acquired by the Federal Government in 1863 at New Albany, Indiana, for use by the Union Army during the American Civil War—was transferred to the Union Navy in 1864; and commissioned on 24 May, Lt. Comdr. Thomas O. Selfridge in command. Shortly after her transfer from the Army, Vindicator was reworked at Mound City, Illinois, for use as a ram in the Mississippi Squadron. She was assigned Command to the 5th District of the squadron on 4 July and deployed off Natchez, Mississippi, later that month. While off Natchez, Vindicator and her squadron performed patrol and reconnaissance duties, and the mere presence and vigilance of the formidable Union gunboats there were credited with preventing a planned Confederate crossing of the river on 22 August.

Vindicator was transferred to the 6th District of the Mississippi River for duty in early November. During an expedition up the Yazoo River, Vindicator and the stern-wheeler Prairie Bird transported and covered Union cavalry forces in an attack on Confederate communications in western Mississippi on the 27th. The Federals destroyed the railroad bridge over the Big Black River and tore up tracks for a distance of 30 miles around. Major General Napoleon J. T. Dana praised the performance of the two gunboats, saying: "the assistance of the vessels of the Sixth Division Mississippi Squadron rendered the expedition a complete success."

Vindicator remained in the 6th District for the duration of the war and conducted a spirited, though unsuccessful, pursuit of the ram William H. Webb off the mouth of the Red River in Mississippi on 23 and 24 April 1865. During the chase, Acting Master D. P. Slattery of Vindicator stoked his boilers to near bursting point, commenting that, "such was the spirit animating every officer, man, and boy that all seemed to vie with each other in the rapid and intelligent execution of each order." Vindicator was withdrawn from service soon thereafter and laid up at Mound City, where she was partially dismantled in July. She was sold at public auction at Mound City to W. L. Hambleton on 29 November; redocumented New Orleans on 27 February 1866; and dropped from documentation in 1869.

== See also ==
- Anaconda Plan
- Mississippi Squadron
