= AN/UQQ-2 Surveillance Towed Array Sensor System =

Towed array sonar system

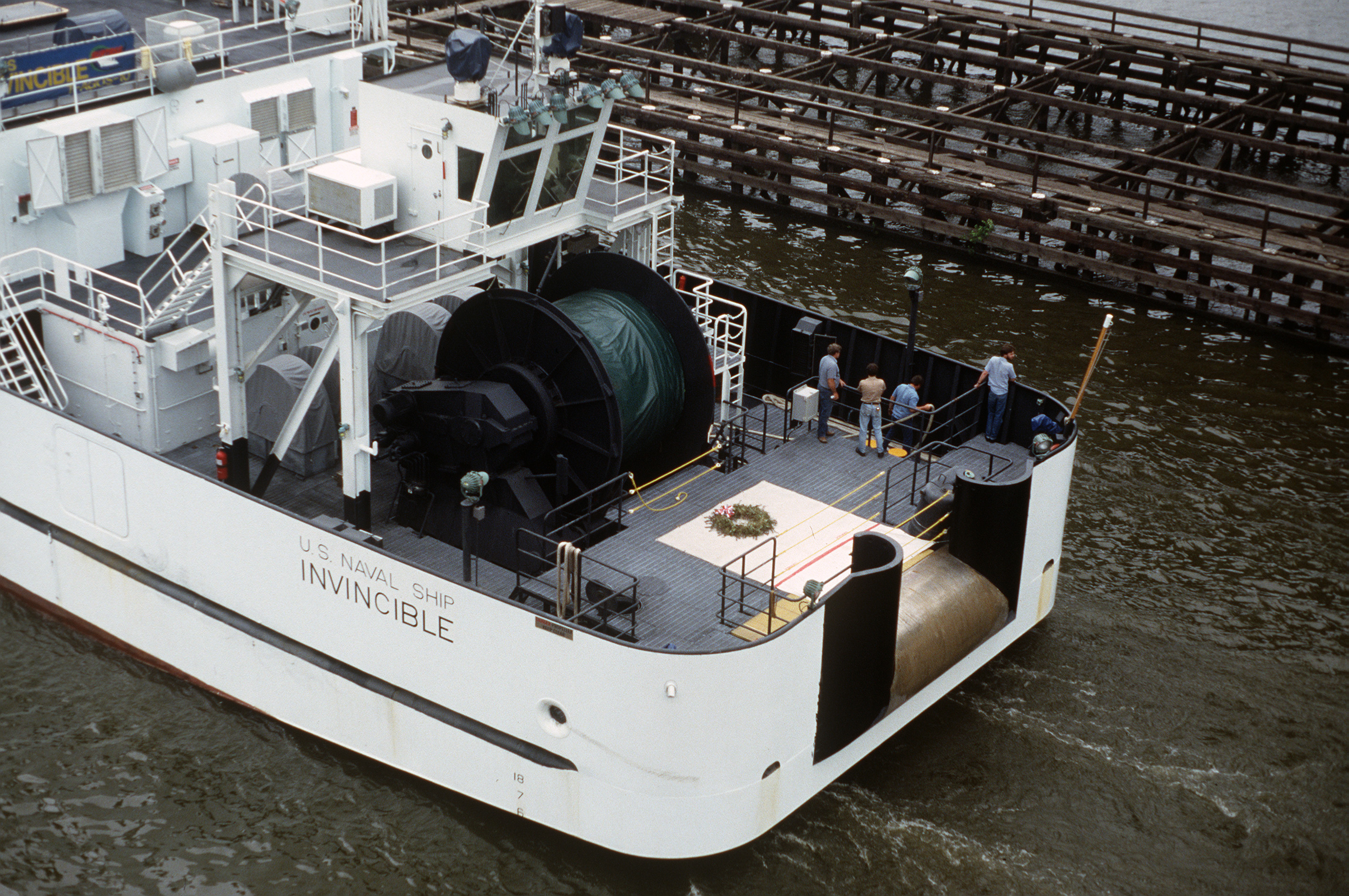
USNS Invincible as originally configured. Aft view of equipment for the Surveillance Towed-Array Sensor System (SURTASS), 1987.

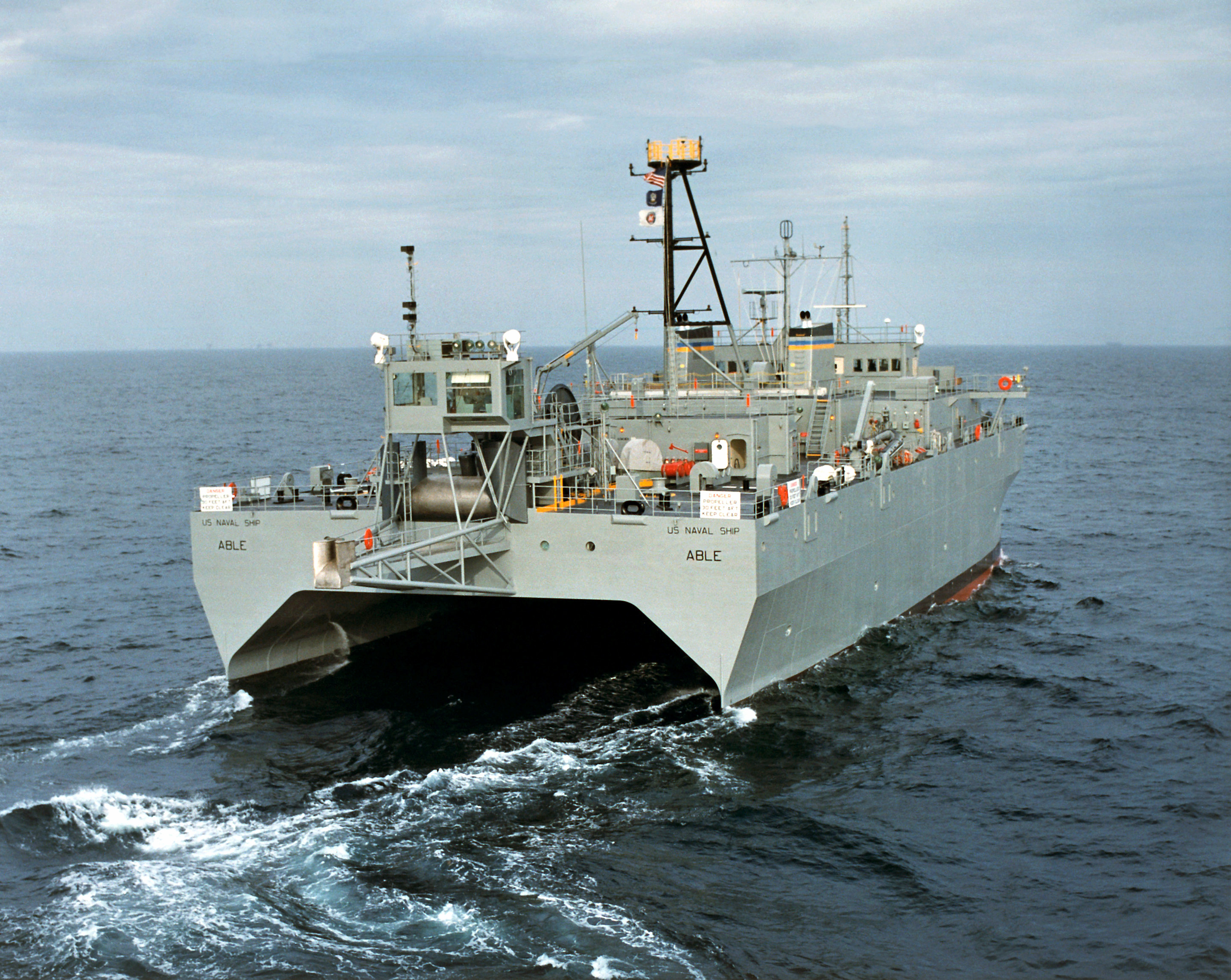
USNS Able (T-AGOS-20) aft view of SURTASS equipment.

The AN/UQQ-2 Surveillance Towed Array Sensor System (SURTASS), colloquially referred to as the ship's "Tail", is a towed array sonar system of the United States Navy.

SURTASS Twin-Line consists of either the long passive SURTASS array or the Twin-line array, consisting of two shorter passive arrays towed side by side. The Twin-line Engineering Development Model was installed on USNS Assertive, and the first production model was installed on USNS Bold. Neither ship still serve as SURTASS units.

As of 2009, SURTASS was deployed on the four Victorious-class vessels and the USNS Impeccable (T-AGOS-23) (a small-waterplane-area twin hull (SWATH) vessel).

In accordance with the Joint Electronics Type Designation System (JETDS), the "AN/UQQ-2" designation represents the second design of an Army-Navy electronic device for general utility sonar special combination equipment. The JETDS system also now is used to name all Department of Defense electronic systems.

== History ==
SURTASS began as development program in 1973 using the new research vessel Moana Wave. In 1980 SURTASS passed OPEVAL. The new Stalwart-class ocean surveillance ships had the first contract awarded on 26 September 1980 and were similar to the prototype ship, the Moana Wave. Initially the SURTASS system were passive, receiving only sonar systems. The array was towed miles behind the ships and were designed for long range detection of submarines.

As the passive systems were being deployed, an active adjunct known as the SURTASS Low Frequency Active (LFA) systems was designed for long range detection. The active system must be used in conjunction with the passive received system. The active component transmits an audio signal between 100 Hz and 500 Hz from an array suspended below the ship while the passive SURTASS array is towed miles behind to receive the signal after it had reflected off the submarine. The active LFA system is an updated version of the fixed low frequency surveillance system known as Project Artemis. Although the Navy took steps to mitigate the environmental damage, environmental non-governmental organizations (NGOs) urged the Navy to prepare a public environmental impact statement. In 1996 the Navy published a notice of intent to prepare an environmental impact statement. The Navy has spent over $16 million on scientific research on the effects on marine mammals and mitigation systems as well as the development of an Environmental Impact Statement.

- The SURTASS Low Frequency Active Sonar system, on board Impeccable, commenced sea trials in late February 2004. During the spring and summer of 2004, Impeccable conducted five training missions in the Philippine Sea and the northwest Pacific Ocean. All LFA sonar operations included the operation of the High Frequency / Marine Mammal Mitigation sonar and compliance with all mitigation requirements.
- Total operational days on board the Impeccable using the LFA array:

(August 15, 2003 to August 15, 2004) 26.2 days with 63.0 hours of transmissions
(August 15, 2004 to August 15, 2005) 9.4 days with 22.7 hours of transmissions
(August 15, 2005 to August 15, 2006) 22.5 days with 39.4 hours of transmissions

- The ship had five years of active and passive operations in the Western Pacific before an incident in the South China Sea.

== Description ==
SURTASS LFA is a long-range, all-weather, sonar system with both passive and active components, operating in the low frequency (LF) band (100–500 hertz [Hz]). USNS Impeccable has the original LFA system, weighing 155 tonnes; the 64-tonne Compact LFA derivative was developed for the smaller Victorious class. CLFA was installed on Able in 2008, on Effective in 2011 and Victorious in 2012; no further installations are planned.

The active system component, LFA, is an adjunct to the passive detection system, SURTASS, and is planned for use when passive system performance proves inadequate. LFA is a set of acoustic transmitting source elements suspended by cable from underneath a ship. These elements, called projectors, are devices that produce the active sound pulse, or ping. The projectors transform electrical energy to mechanical energy that set up vibrations or pressure disturbances within the water to produce a ping.

The characteristics and operating features of LFA are:

- The source is a vertical line array (VLA) of up to 18 source projectors suspended below the vessel. LFA's transmitted sonar beam is omnidirectional (i.e., a full 360 degrees) in the horizontal (nominal depth of the LFA array center is 120 m [400 ft]), with a narrow vertical beamwidth that can be steered above or below the horizontal.
- The source frequency is between 100 and 500 Hz (the LFA system's physical design does not allow for transmissions below 100 Hz). A variety of signal types can be used, including continuous wave (CW) and frequency-modulated (FM) signals. Signal bandwidth is approximately 30 Hz.
- The source level (SL) of an individual source projector is approximately 215 decibels (dB re 1 μPa^{2} m^{2}).
- The typical LFA transmitted sonar signal is not a constant tone, but a transmission of various waveforms that vary in frequency and duration. A complete sequence of transmissions is referred to as a ping and lasts from 6 to 100 seconds, although the duration of each continuous frequency transmission is never longer than 10 seconds.
- Duty cycles (ratio of sound “on” time to total time) are less than 20 percent—20 percent is the maximum physical limit of the LFA system. Typical duty cycles are approximately 7.5 to 10 percent.
- The time between pings is typically from 6 to 15 minutes.

The passive, or listening, part of the system is SURTASS, which detects returning echoes from submerged objects, such as submarines, through the use of hydrophones. These devices transform mechanical energy (received acoustic sound wave) to an electrical signal that can be analyzed by the signal processing system of the sonar. The SURTASS hydrophones are mounted on a horizontal receive array that is towed behind the vessel. The array length is 1,500 m (4,900 ft) with an operational depth of 150 to 460 m (500 to 1,500 ft). The SURTASS LFA ship must maintain a minimum speed of approximately 6 kilometres per hour (3.2 knots) through the water in order to tow the hydrophone array in the horizontal plane. The return signals or echoes, which are usually below background or ambient noise level, are then processed and evaluated to identify and classify potential underwater targets.

== See also ==
- Sonar 2087, low frequency active sonar fitted to British warships, the CAPTAS4 derivative is being tested by the US Navy
- List of military electronics of the United States
