= George G. Sharp =

American naval architecture firm

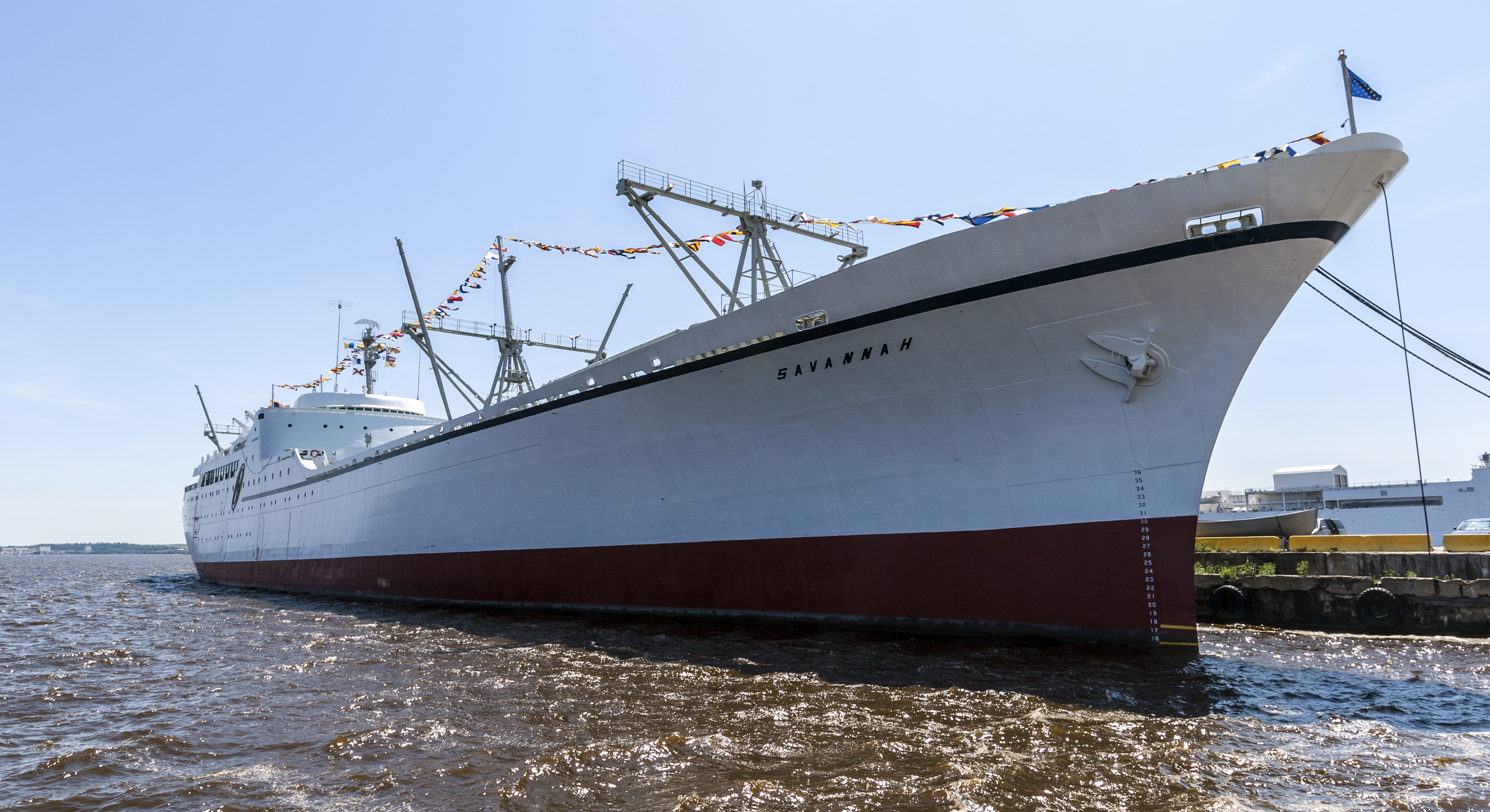
NS Savannah, designed by George G. Sharp, Inc.

George G. Sharp, Inc. was a marine design and naval architecture firm established in 1920 in New York City by George Gillies Sharp, former Chief Surveyor of the American Bureau of Shipping. The firm started with the design of excursion steamboats on the Delaware and Hudson rivers, then moved into oceangoing passenger and cargo shipping. From 1934 Sharp designed a standardized series of merchant ships for the U.S. Department of Commerce. During World War II Sharp designed the standardized Victory ship, of which 534 were built, and 50 escort carriers.

Some of the 1500 vessels designed by Sharp include:

- Type C2 ship prototype
- Type C3 ship prototype
- SS Ancon, SS Panama and SS Cristobal, "World of Tomorrow" ships for the Panama Railroad Steamship line, 1939
- Milwaukee Clipper, the last passenger steamship on the Great Lakes, 1940
- Mississippi River Towboat, built for the United States Army Corps of Engineers, 1942
- Victory ship, 534 built during World War II
- Casablanca-class escort carrier, 50 built during World War II
- USS Klondike (AD-22) and three other destroyer tenders based on C3 hulls during World War II
- Owasco-class cutter, 13 built for the U.S. Coast Guard during World War II
- SS Del Norte, SS Del Sud and SS Del Mar passenger cargo ships for the Mississippi Shipping Company's South American Service, 1946–47
- USS Rigel (AF-58) and USS Vega (AF-59) storeships for the U.S. Navy in the 1950s
- Wichita-class replenishment oiler, class of seven for the U.S. Navy in the 1960s
- NS Savannah, the first nuclear-powered merchant ship
- Virginia-class cruiser, four nuclear-powered cruisers for the U.S. Navy in the 1970s
- Staten Island Ferrys Andrew J. Barberi and Samuel I. Newhouse (1970s), Alice Austen and John A. Noble (1980s and 1990s), and the Guy V. Molinari, Senator John. J. Marchi and Spirit of America (2000s).

By the 1930s Sharp was described together with Gibbs & Cox as one of the leading naval architecture firms in the United States. In 1938, he designed the passenger cargo vessel Cristobal for Panama Line Service to the Canal Zone.

Sharp prepared the working drawings for the Casablanca class escort carriers built by Henry J. Kaiser's California Shipbuilding Corporation in 1942–43. and the working plans for the Victory Ship series in 1943, allowing individual shipbuilding yards to modify the plans according to local practices.

After World War II, the company developed a 17,000-ton luxury liner, the SS Del Norte, for service between New Orleans and the east coast of South America. The Del Norte was built by the Ingalls Shipbuilding Corporation at Pascagoula, Mississippi and each room featured ocean views through casement windows. The ships were characterized by a dummy funnel in which officer's quarters, radio room and emergency generator were housed. Del Norte, first of the three, was described as 'today's ship of tomorrow,' it was the first cargo-passenger ship equipped with commercial radar.

In addition to design services, Sharp provides consultation on modification, maintenance, safety, systems integration and program management, with about 600 employees.
