= SS Milwaukee Clipper =

Retired US passenger and car ferry

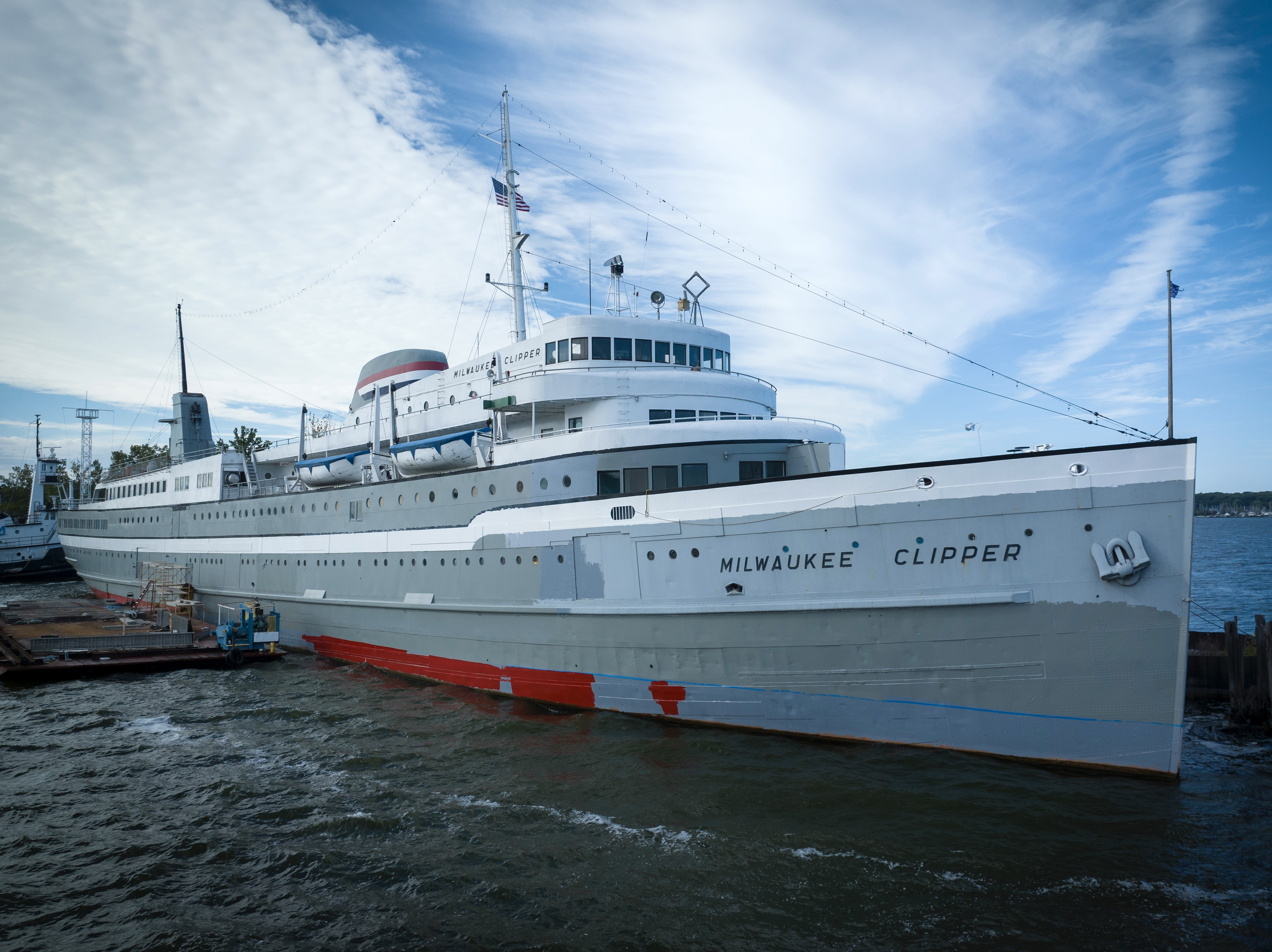
- The SS Milwaukee Clipper in September, 2024.

History

United States
- Name: SS Juniata (1904–1940); SS Milwaukee Clipper (1940–1977); SS Clipper [Unofficial] (1977–1990); SS Milwaukee Clipper (1990–)
- Operator: Erie and Western Transportation Company (1904–1915); Great Lakes Transit Corporation (1915–1939); Sand Products Corporation (1939-1977); Illinois Steamship Company (1977–1990); Hammond Port Authority (1990–1997); SS Milwaukee Clipper Preservation, Inc. (1997–)
- Route: Buffalo to Duluth (as built) Muskegon to Milwaukee (conversion)
- Ordered: 1904
- Builder: American Shipbuilding Company (as built); Manitowoc Shipbuilding Company (conversion)
- Way number: 423
- Laid down: 1904
- Launched: December 17, 1904
- Maiden voyage: June 3, 1941 (conversion)
- In service: 1905
- Out of service: 1970
- Identification: IMO number: 5235375; Callsign: WA8201
- Status: Docked in Muskegon, Michigan
- Notes: Museum Ship

General characteristics
- Tonnage: 4,333 GT, 2,619 NT (as built); 4,272 GT, 3,137 NT (conversion)
- Length: 361 ft (110 m)
- Beam: 45 ft (14 m)
- Decks: 6 (conversion)
- Installed power: Detroit Shipbuilding Company Quadruple Expansion Steam Engine, 2,500 horsepower (1,900 kW) - 4 American Shipbuilding Company Double Furnace Single-Ended Scotch Marine Boilers
- Propulsion: Single Screw
- Speed: 14 knots (26 km/h; 16 mph) (as built) 18 knots (33 km/h; 21 mph) (conversion)
- Capacity: 900 Passengers (conversion)
- Crew: 120 Crew (conversion)
- SS Milwaukee Clipper (passenger steamship)
- U.S. National Register of Historic Places
- U.S. National Historic Landmark
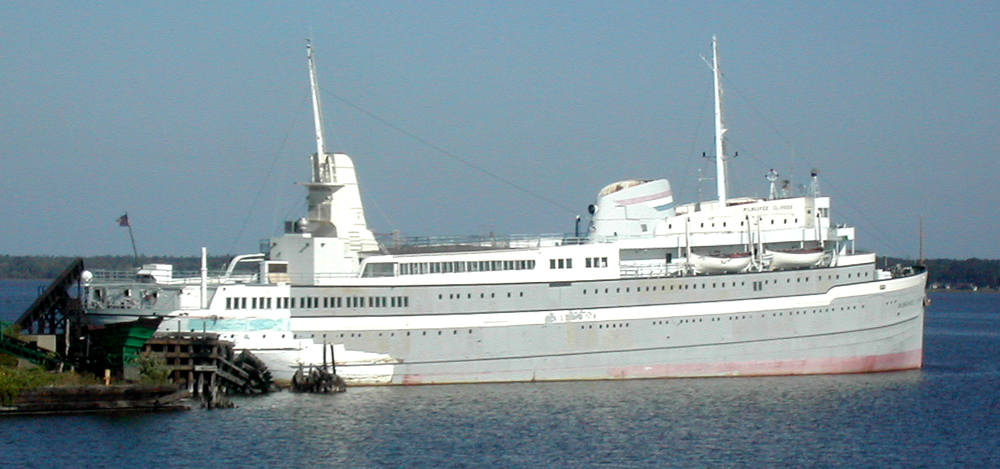
- Milwaukee Clipper docked at Muskegon, Michigan

- Location within Michigan Location within the United States
- Location: Grand Trunk Ferry Dock Muskegon, Michigan (formerly Chicago, Illinois and Hammond, Indiana)
- Coordinates: 43°13′19″N 86°17′45″W
- Area: Muskegon
- Built: 1904, Rebuilt 1941
- Architect: American Shipbuilding Co. Redesigned in 1940 by George G. Sharp
- Architectural style: Art Deco, Streamlined Moderne
- NRHP reference No.: 83003570

Significant dates
- Added to NRHP: December 8, 1983
- Designated NHL: April 11, 1989

The SS Milwaukee Clipper, also known as the SS Clipper , and formerly the SS Juniata, is a retired passenger ship and automobile ferry that sailed under two configurations and traveled on four of the five Great Lakes, excluding Lake Ontario. The vessel is now docked as a museum in Muskegon, Michigan.

== Juniata ==
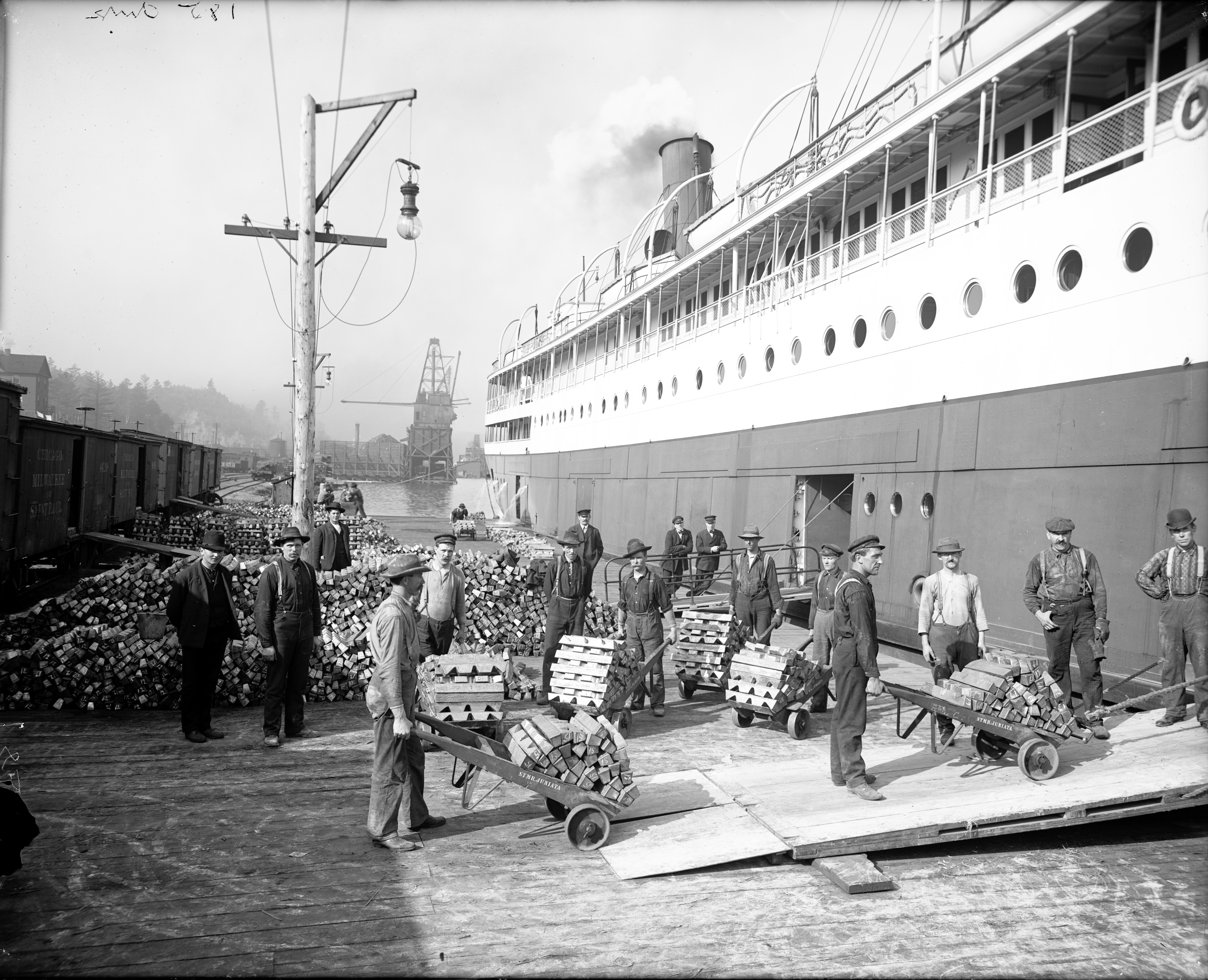
Loading copper, c. 1905

The Juniata was launched on December 17, 1904, in Cleveland, Ohio, at the shipyards of the American Shipbuilding Company. Christened Juniata when she was launched, she was built for the Erie and Western Transportation Company, also known as the Anchor Line. This was the Great Lakes passenger and shipping division of the Pennsylvania Railroad. Her sister ships were the SS Tionesta of 1902 and SS Octorara of 1910.

The ship is 361 feet (110 m) in length, and 45 feet (14 m) in beam, with a gross tonnage of 4333 tons. In her original configuration, she carried 350 passengers in staterooms at a cruising speed of 13.5 knots. As originally built, she had a riveted steel hull and a wooden superstructure. For the Pennsylvania Railroad, she carried passengers and package freight between Buffalo, New York and Duluth, Minnesota until 1915.

That year, the anti-monopoly Panama Canal Act, which forbade railroads from owning steamships, went into effect. Forced to divest from its marine divisions, the Pennsylvania Railroad sold its Anchor Line along with four other railroad-owned company fleets, to the newly formed Great Lakes Transit Corporation. Under this flag, she carried passengers along her old routes for another 20 seasons. For the duration of the 1933 season, Juniata carried passengers to and from Chicago for the Chicago World's Fair. Juniata was laid up in 1936 due to poor economic conditions as well as new regulations on wooden passenger ships following the Morro Castle disaster.

== Milwaukee Clipper ==
Juniata was moored in Buffalo until being sold in 1940 to Wisconsin & Michigan Steamship Company, a subsidiary of the McKee family-owned Sand Products Corporation of Detroit, MI. She was rebuilt and used as a passenger ship on Lake Michigan. Juniata was extensively modernized at the yard of the Manitowoc Shipbuilding Company. Her boilers were converted to burn fuel oil instead of coal, and the old cabins and wooden superstructure were removed and replaced with steel to meet the new maritime fire safety standards created after the SS Morro Castle fire off Asbury Park, New Jersey in 1934. The streamlined forward stack is false and does not ventilate engine exhaust. It is a signature of naval architect George Sharp, whose ideas regarding fireproof ships were first incorporated into Juniata. This stack became standard on many new ships that were to come. Sharp is credited with three historic vessels, Milwaukee Clipper, SS Lane Victory, and NS Savannah.

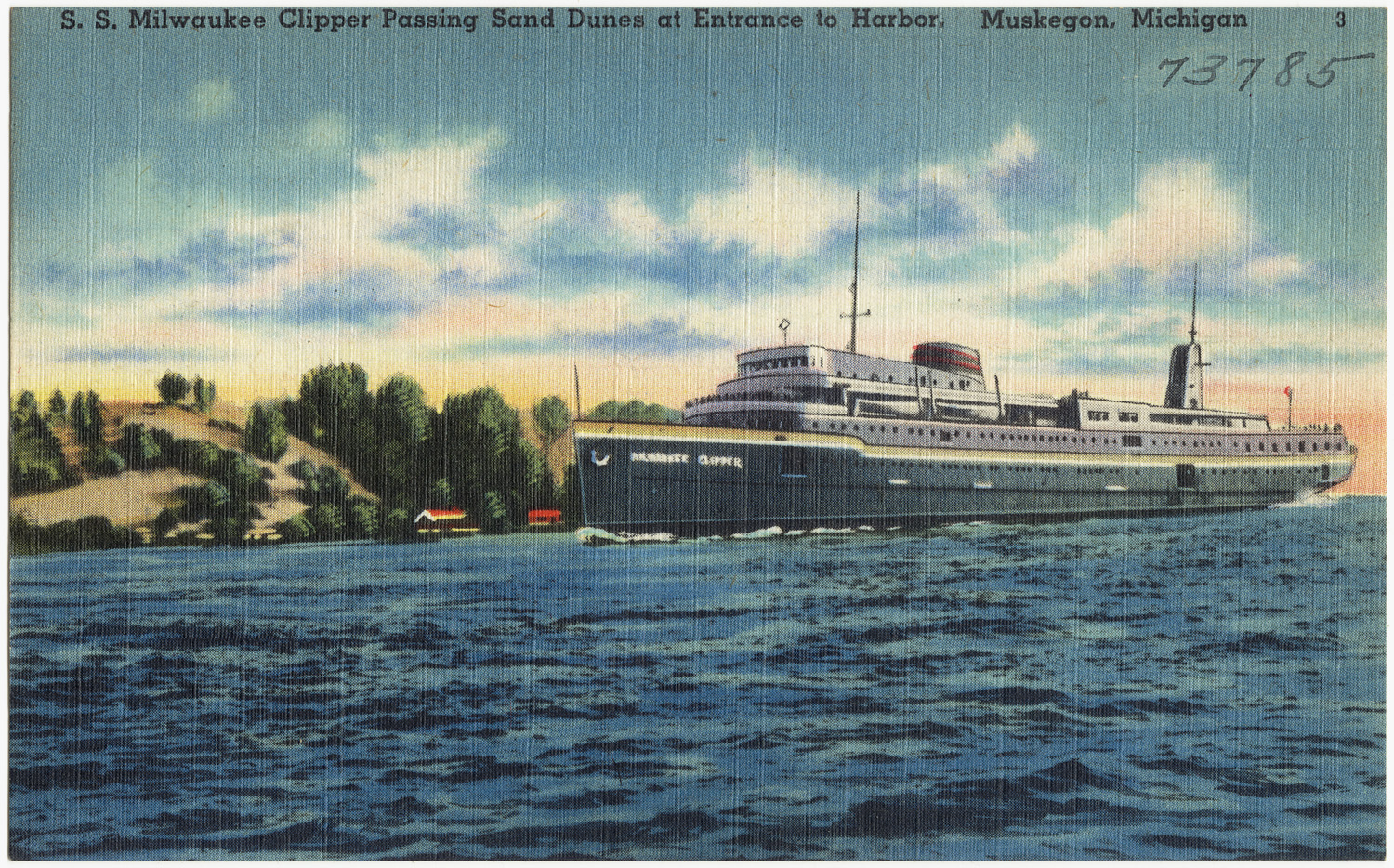
The ship passing sand dunes at the entrance to the harbor in Muskegon.

The modernized ship now featured air conditioned staterooms, a children's playroom, a movie theater, a dance floor with a live band, a soda fountain, bar, cafeteria, lounges and sports deck, and capacity to carry 120 automobiles. She was christened Milwaukee Clipper on June 2, 1941, by Patricia McKee, daughter of Max B. McKee, principal of Sand Products Corporation, owner of the vessel. She made her maiden voyage from Milwaukee to Muskegon the following day. As Milwaukee Clipper, she steamed between Muskegon and Milwaukee, as well as excursions throughout Lake Michigan visiting various other ports, for 29 seasons. She was also called the "Queen of the Great Lakes" and carried around 900 passengers and 120 automobiles in the summer. The amount of oil used varied per round trip, but was approximately 5,500 US gallons (21,000 L; 4,600 imp gal). On week days she made two round trips that took 7 hours each way, using three of the four boilers. On weekends, she made three, six-hour round trips on all four boilers. The crew lists were between 105 and 109, with around 55 of them in the steward's department alone to take care of the around 900 passengers on board. The cost per person in the 1950s was $3.33 and $8.00 extra for an automobile, with an extra 75 cents charged to travel in the forward Club Lounge and to use the forward deck.

During her inaugural season, a space on the Sports Deck was leased to a Chicago based entertainment firm. The firm placed ten slot machines onboard, covering them when the ship was in port. Once the ship was three miles from shore, the covers were removed. The slot machines soon came to the attention of the Muskegon County Prosecuting Attorney, who took a trip on the ship to witness the slot machines in use.

On July 25, 1941, Sgt. Earl Secrist of the Grand Haven State Police and another officer boarded the ship and attempted to serve a search warrant to Captain Allen K. Hoxie. Hoxie left the wheelhouse and put on civilian clothes while remaining on the ship. The first officer was given orders to pull away from the dock, so the ship departed. Once mid-lake, the officers were informed that they no longer had jurisdiction over the vessel. Secrist used the revolutionary "ship-to-shore" telephone onboard and informed the authorities in Milwaukee of the machines. When the vessel docked in Milwaukee, the slot machines were seized. Eventually, the charges against Captain Hoxie and the owners of the vessel were dropped.

During World War II, Milwaukee Clipper transported defense materials between Muskegon and Milwaukee. The ship had contracts with auto manufacturers to carry new cars during her entire career. The passenger season was between May and September. After that she was under various limited passenger certificates which allowed her to carry a reduced number of passengers and up to 250 automobiles.

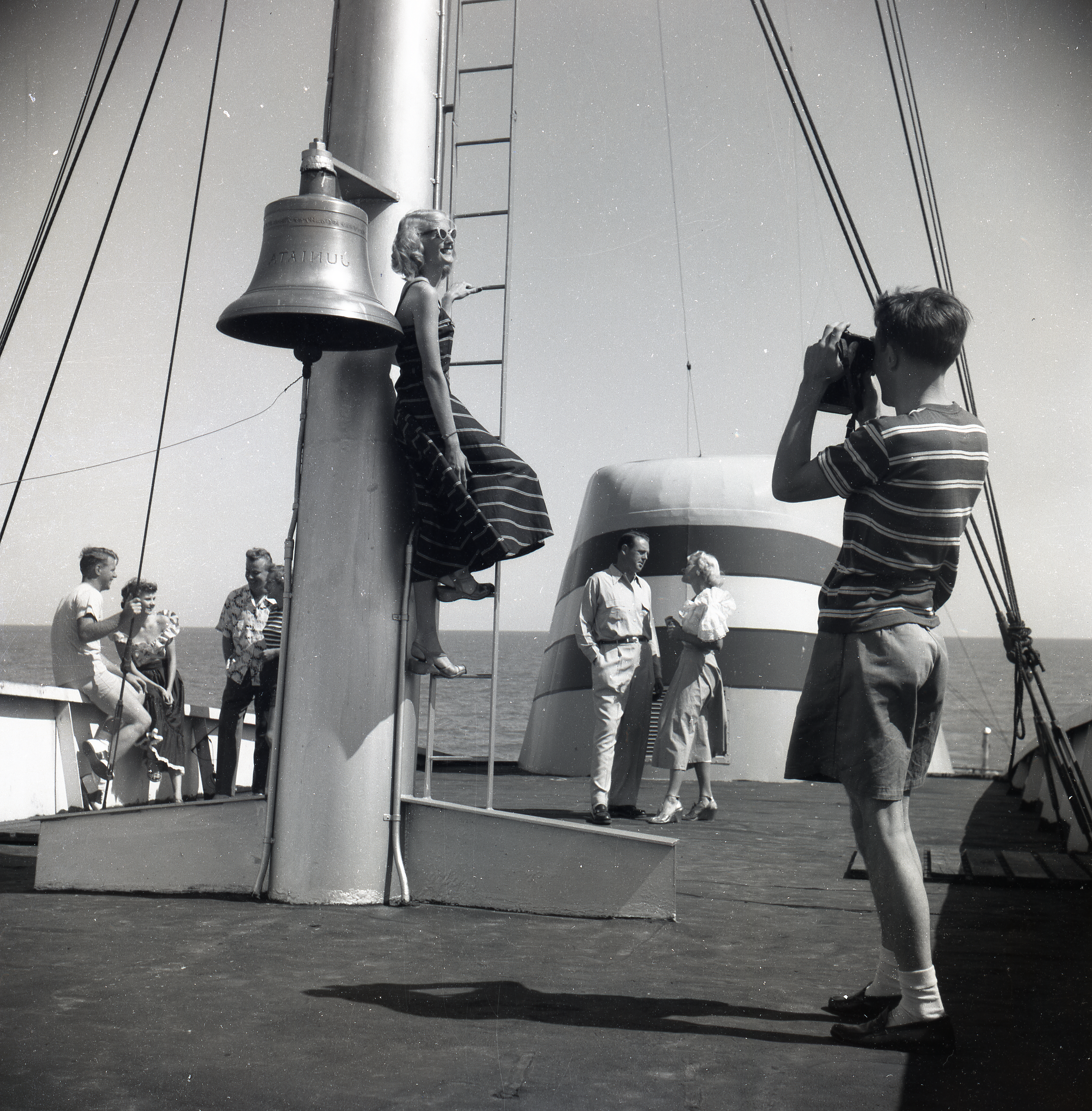
Passengers aboard the Milwaukee Clipper.

While preparing to leave Milwaukee on January 6, 1949, the ship was caught in a powerful gust of wind. This caused the stern to swing across the riverbank and strike a concrete barrier on the other side. The ship's rudder was snapped off in the incident and the propeller and stern block were damaged. The ship was towed to Manitowoc for six weeks of repairs.

By 1970, the company had plans to replace Milwaukee Clipper with the newer and larger Aquarama. Negotiations regarding dredging the Milwaukee harbor for Aquarama failed and the plan did not materialize. Ironically, though 1970 was a banner year for Milwaukee Clipper, she stopped running her regular route after that year.

== Museum ship ==
In 1977, Milwaukee Clipper was purchased by Chicago interests headed by James Gillon, operating out of Navy Pier. They planned to put her on a Chicago to Milwaukee run made popular by the whaleback passenger ship SS Christopher Columbus. Unfortunately, after being towed to Bay Shipbuilding for inspection, financial backing fell through and Milwaukee Clipper was seized by the U.S. Marshal. After several court cases, the vessel was returned to Gillon, being towed to Chicago in 1980 for use as a museum ship on Navy Pier.

In December 1983, Milwaukee Clipper was listed on the National Register of Historic Places, and in May 1989 the ship was designated a National Historic Landmark. Today, both plaques are on board the ship. The next year (1990), she was sold to Hammond, Indiana where she served as the centerpiece for their large new marina. After Milwaukee Clipper was replaced by a new casino ship, she was towed to South Chicago and laid up on the Calumet River. She was sold on December 2, 1997 for use as a museum in Muskegon, Michigan, her old home port.

Milwaukee Clipper is currently docked in Muskegon, Michigan at the old Grand Trunk Ferry dock, undergoing restoration by volunteers of the SS Milwaukee Clipper Preservation, Inc. organization. In the summer season, visitors tour the pilothouse, some staterooms, crew quarters, dance floor, soda bowl, movie theater and more. A large collection of the original Art Deco furniture remains on board. Warren McArthur was the designer and builder of the ship furniture. The frames were all aluminum. He designed furniture for buildings, such as theaters, and there were no two that were alike. A piece of Milwaukee Clipper furniture off the ship is readily identifiable. There are also displays of memorabilia from both Juniata and Milwaukee Clipper, which include memory books, photographs, brochures, dishes and other items of interest. The Clipper retains the last American quadruple expansion steam engine.

== Media and legacy ==
A 45-minute documentary, The Milwaukee Clipper: A Legend Saved, was produced by filmmaker Mark Howell in 1997 and shown on PBS. The program has interviews with the key people who worked aboard the ship and includes restored 16 mm color film footage of Milwaukee Clipper's christening, sailing, and other operations.

Additionally In November 2023, the creator known as PartTimeExplorer released a 63-minute documentary on YouTube titled SS Milwaukee Clipper – Queen of the Great Lakes. The film documents the Clipper’s condition as a museum and undergoing restoration project in Muskegon, Michigan. It features areas not typically included on public tours, including the boiler room and ballast tanks, and explores the ship’s history through interviews and historical accounts.

== See also ==
- Lake Express, service along the same route since 2004
- U.S. Route 16, the route broken by Lake Michigan whose gap the Milwaukee Clipper bridged
- SS Keewatin
- SS Badger
