= USS Vega (AF-59) =

Cargo ship of the United States Navy

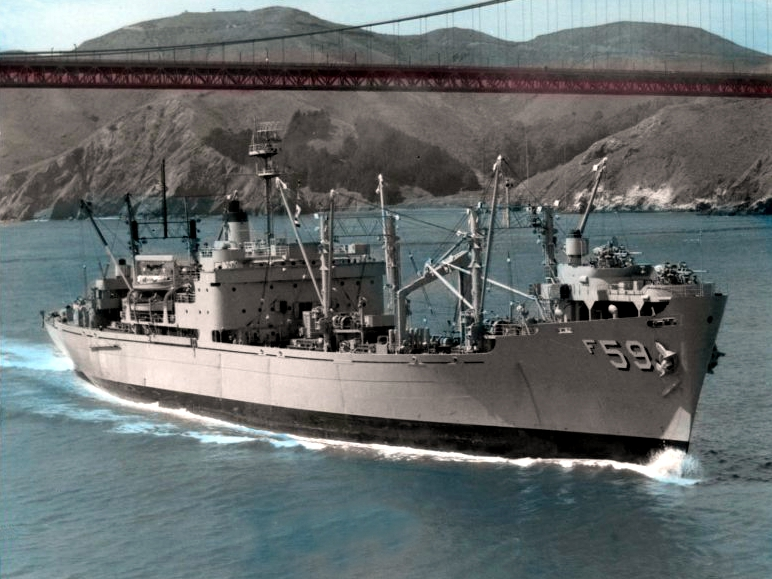

History

United States
- Ordered: as R3-S-4A hull, MA 37
- Laid down: 7 June 1954
- Launched: 28 April 1955
- Commissioned: 10 November 1955
- Decommissioned: 29 April 1977
- Stricken: 29 April 1977
- Fate: Sold 1 December 1977, fate unknown

General characteristics
- Displacement: 15,150 tons(fl)
- Length: 502 ft (153 m)
- Beam: 72 ft (22 m)
- Draught: 29 ft (8.8 m)
- Propulsion: 600psi cross compound steam turbine, single propeller
- Speed: 21 kts.
- Complement: 350 (USS crew)
- Armament: four dual mount 3 in (76 mm) gun mounts

USS Vega (AF-59) was a Rigel-class stores ship acquired by the U.S. Navy. Her task was to carry stores, refrigerated items, and equipment to ships in the fleet, and to remote stations and staging areas. She served during the entire Vietnam War and returned home with numerous battle stars and commendations.

The third ship to be named Vega by the Navy, AF-59 was laid down on 7 June 1954 at Pascagoula, Mississippi, by the Ingalls Shipbuilding Corp.; launched on 28 April 1955; sponsored by Mrs. Theodore C. Lonnquest; and commissioned on 10 November 1955.

== Pacific Ocean deployment ==
Following shakedown, Vega sailed for the U.S. West Coast and duty with the U.S. Pacific Fleet. Between January 1956 and mid-1964, Vega made 13 deployments to the Far East, usually about four months in length. During this time, the versatile storeship sailed an average of over 30,000 miles per year and routinely visited Yokosuka and Sasebo, Japan; Hong Kong; Subic Bay, Philippines; and Kaohsiung, Formosa, with an occasional run to Kobe and Iwakuni, Japan. In 1956, Vega set a record for ships of her type when she provisioned Shangri-La (CVA-38) at a rate of 218 tons per hour. In 1963, the Vega again proved herself to be the Navy's fastest working storeship as she delivered 117 tons of provisions to Ranger (CVA-61) in just 27 minutes, giving her a transfer rate of 245 tons per hour.

== Vietnam operations ==
From October 1964 to January 1965, Vega participated in Fleet operations off the coast of Vietnam before she returned to the United States in February 1965. Returning to Vietnamese waters in the late spring, she once more supported U.S. 7th Fleet units.

=== Change of command at sea ===
While underway in the South China Sea on 8 September 1965, Vega was the scene of an unusual change of command, when Capt. T. A. Melusky relieved Capt. R. E. Hill as commanding officer. The ceremony took place at 0128, on the port wing of the bridge, by the light of red-filtered flashlights, with the ship darkened during an underway replenishment of Constellation (CVA-64). The storeship returned to the United States in October 1965.

Vega was again deployed to the 7th Fleet from February to May 1966. During this time, the ship replenished her first two nuclear-powered ships, Bainbridge (DLGN-25) and Enterprise (CVAN-65).

=== Visiting Vietnamese ports ===
Later, during her next WestPac tour, Vega conducted 125 underway and 26 in-port replenishments—more than during any other deployment. Besides her normal Japanese ports of call, she also visited Danang and An Thoi, Vietnam, while calling for the first time at Singapore.

=== Supporting Operation Market Time ===
As American involvement in Vietnam deepened, Vega's deployment schedule reflected this increase in operations. While deployed in the summer of 1966, Vega steamed in company with Hector (AR-7), Ashtabula (AO-51), Paricutin (AE-18), and Currituck (AV-7). From 22 August to 21 November, she supported ships operating on Yankee Station and Operation Market Time.

=== Based out of San Francisco ===
She remained thus employed, with regular deployments to WestPac through 1969. In between her deployments to the "Yankee-Station" or to "Market-Time" zones, Vega maintained a regular schedule of local operations, overhauls, and refresher training upon return to the west coast. Homeported at San Francisco, California, Vega continued her unglamorous but vital duty of providing the necessary supplies to keep the Fleet and its men in top operating condition.

After loading at Oakland, California, from 24 March to 4 April 1969, Vega sailed on 5 April for Yokosuka, Japan.

=== American EC-121 plane shot down ===
Her normal routine of operations was interrupted later that month, when North Korean MiG fighters shot down an American EC-121 surveillance aircraft over the Sea of Japan. As tensions rose between Pyongyang and Washington, D.C., the 7th Fleet responded to the crisis by dispatching a task force which included the nuclear attack carrier Enterprise to the vicinity. Vega joined Task Group (TG) 73.7 on 24 April in support of Task Force (TF) 71 in the Sea of Japan and performed 17 underway replenishments between the 24th and the 29th.

With the relaxation of tensions, Vega was detached on the latter date and resumed her regular WestPac replenishment operations to the 7th Fleet. Vega began her first line period for 1969 on 9 May and replenished 22 ships before returning to Subic Bay on the 16th. On 31 May, the refrigerator ship commenced a 37-hour replenishment operation with Niagara Falls (AFS-3) in Subic Bay, delivering some 1,057.5 tons of provisions.

=== Continued support of Market Time ===
On 9 June, Vega got underway to support "Market Time" operations. She replenished in port at An Thoi on 13 June, at Vung Tau on the 15th, Camranh Bay on the 16th, and at Danang on the 17th, before carrying out nine underway replenishments on "Yankee Station," over the next six days.

Returning to Subic Bay on 27 June, the ship remained there until 6 July, when she sailed for Yankee Station—as bad weather had grounded all COD (carrier onboard delivery) aircraft, and supplies needed to be delivered to the Fleet. She arrived on station on 8 July and, alongside Oriskany (CVA-34) four days later, conducted her longest underway replenishment, from 1737 on 12 July to 0105 on the 13th—a period of seven hours and 28 minutes.

=== Assigned SOPA duties in Hong Kong ===
Soon thereafter, Vega shifted to Hong Kong, where her commanding officer became the administrative Senior Officer Present Afloat (SOPA) on 23 July. She and Rowan (DD-782) got underway on the 27th to avoid Typhoon Viola which was then swirling its way up the China coast. Returning two days later, Vega resumed her SOPA duties and continued to carry them out until she departed that port on 8 August, bound for Sasebo. There, the supply ship loaded Fleet freight and soon sailed for the west coast of the United States, arriving at San Francisco, California, on 5 September, where she remained for the rest of 1969.

=== 1970 Stateside overhaul ===
After entering the Hunters Point Naval Shipyard on 2 January 1970 for her regular overhaul, Vega spent three months in dockyard hands before she emerged on 2 April to commence refresher training out of San Diego, California. She trained in the southern California operating area into the summer, before shifting on 21 August to the Army Refrigerator (Reefer) Piers at Oakland, California. There, she conducted a pre-deployment loadout of goods for shipment to the western Pacific.

=== Return to WestPac ===
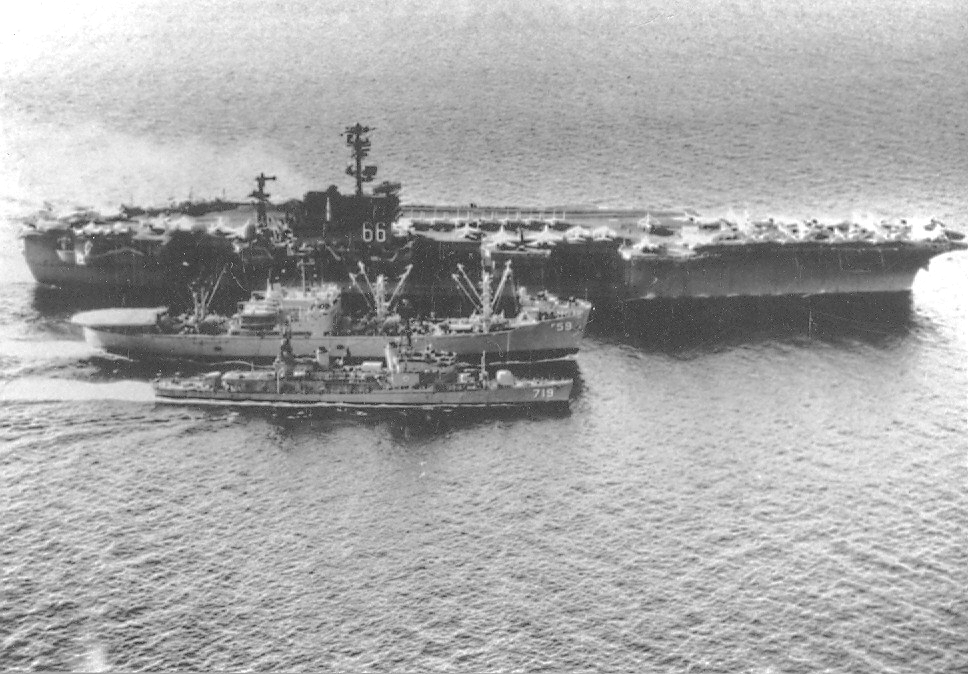
Vega replenishing America and Epperson off Vietnam.

Vega again got underway on 11 September, bound for Subic Bay, and crossed the 160th meridian east on 26 September to commence officially her WestPac tour. After evading typhoon "Hope" en route, Vega stopped briefly at Subic Bay before she pressed on, on 8 October for her first line tour of the deployment on Yankee Station off the coast of Vietnam. She returned to Subic on 22 October. During this tour, she transferred over 226 tons of foodstuffs during underway replenishments.

Her second line period saw the ship transfer 290 tons of provisions to ships with task force TF 77 on Yankee Station. Bangkok, Thailand, provided welcome relief for liberty parties before the ship returned to the line a third time on 29 November. Operating in support of "Market Time," Vega transferred some 392 tons of food -- Christmas supplies—to ships engaged in the daily interdiction patrols of the sea lanes. Further, the ship delivered some 67 tons of supplies to Danang, Camranh Bay, Con Son, An Thoi, and Hon Choi—all in South Vietnam.

After visiting Hong Kong from 13 to 21 December, Vega spent Christmas at Kaohsiung, Taiwan, and then returned to Subic Bay to load supplies. Before the year was out, the supply ship was underway again—for her fourth line period off Vietnam. During this swing, the ship transferred 300 tons of food to ships on "Yankee Station" and "Market Time" patrols. Many sailors on the ships she supplied probably enjoyed the fresh fruit acquired on Taiwan during the ship's visit there prior to deploying off the Vietnam coastline.

=== Serving the troops through difficult weather ===
The supply vessel conducted two more swings on the patrol line in the sea lanes off Vietnam into early 1971. Extremely difficult weather conditions hampered such operations on 29 and 30 January 1971, but the men on the ships involved rose to the occasion and accomplished the successful transfer of 100 tons of food without incident. Offloading 342 tons of supplies at the Naval Supply Depot, Subic Bay, from 8 to 10 March, the ship departed the Philippines to visit Japan. While en route, however, Vega was dispatched to search for a Japanese fishing vessel in distress off Yonakuni Jima. Conducting the search in heavy seas and beneath leaden grey overcast skies, Vega's efforts were uncrowned with success, as she found no trace of the distressed ship.

Vega eventually visited Sasebo, from 17 to 20 March, before she got underway for Pearl Harbor, en route to her ultimate destination of Alameda, California.

=== Serving as host ship and attending the Sea Fair ===
Making port at the Naval Air Station, Alameda, on 6 April, Vega later served from 13 to 17 May as host ship at San Francisco for HMCS Terra Nova. Vega then entered Triple "A" Shipyard, San Francisco, on 27 May for a restricted availability which increased the ship's transfer capabilities. Completing these modifications on 23 July, the ship conducted a program of type training off the California coast from the 26th through the 30th, before she sailed north to call at the annual Sea Fair at Seattle, Washington.

During a subsequent refit, again carried out at San Francisco's Triple "A" Shipyard in the summer and again in the fall of 1971, Vega received modifications that further improved her cargo-handling capacities. Specifically, number 3 hold was modified to handle pre-palletized cargo; and existing helicopter facilities were upgraded. In addition, a 4,000-pound pallet conveyor belt was added, as well as battery-charging facilities and a new forklift garage. In between yard periods, the cargo vessel participated in local operations and type training exercises.

=== Vietnam operations coming to a close ===
From 1972 through 1974, Vega continued fulfilling her primary mission of supplying units afloat and ashore with necessary food and cargo. She regularly deployed to the far reaches of the western Pacific operating area and conducted replenishments to ships at sea on "Yankee Station" and "Market Time" patrols and carried out support operations with the Mobile Logistics Support Force. The tempo of the Vietnam War, however, began to change. By the spring of 1973, American involvement on the southeast Asian mainland was drawing to a close.

=== Evacuation of Cambodian refugees ===
After deploying to the line three times in early 1975, Vega sailed from Subic Bay early in March 1975, to provide logistics services for task group TG 76.4, standing by in the Gulf of Thailand to execute Operation Eagle Pull, the evacuation of Cambodian refugees fleeing the communist takeover of that country. She conducted replenishment operations with a wide variety of ships. Returning to Subic Bay to reload on 31 March, she set sail for the second increment of "Eagle Pull," rejoining the forces in the Gulf of Thailand on 5 April. After conducting replenishments with Frederick (LST-1184), Durham (LKA-114), Long Beach (CLGN-9), Reasoner (DE1063), Blue Ridge (LLC-19), Okinawa (LPH-3), and Thomaston (LSD-28), she arrived at Phu Quoc Island to provide supply support for Cambodian refugees, and transferred some 12.4 tons of refugee subsistence items to Dubuque (LPD-8) and Peoria (LST-1183). Rendezvousing with TG 76.4 on the 9th, the busy supply vessel again returned to Phu Quoc on the 10th and to Subic Bay on the 13th.

=== Operation Frequent Wind activity ===
Underway from Subic Bay on 23 April, Vega sailed for the coast of South Vietnam. By this juncture, the government of South Vietnam was collapsing, leaving tons of American-supplied equipment intact for the communist forces. Operation Frequent Wind was launched to evacuate Americans, at-risk Vietnamese and third country nationals, lest they be left behind and fall into communist hands. For the next few days, Vega replenished United States and South Vietnamese Navy ships, delivered passengers and mail, and transferred refugee supplies to vessels loaded with fleeing South Vietnamese. Underway at sea from 25 to 30 April, the supply ship arrived off Vung Tau on 1 May and replenished South Vietnamese naval units YFU-69, HQ-3, HQ-800, and HQ-801 as well as conducted a vertical fleet supply replenishment with Mars (AFS-1) and fleet supplies and mail for five other Navy ships.

Heading for Subic Bay, Vega served as escort for the "New Life" flotilla, heavily laden with Vietnamese refugees and their belongings. Arriving at Subic Bay on the 6th, she stood in with the first contingent of refugee vessels—some 70 craft in all, of all shapes and sizes. Underway for a resumption of escort duties later that day, Vega stood out to sea; she subsequently refueled from Taluga (T-AO-62) on the 7th before conducting underway replenishments over the next two days with Midway (CVA-41), Badger (DE-1071), and Ashtabula (AO-51). Arriving at Subic Bay on 10 May to load supplies, she got underway soon thereafter, in company with Harold E. Holt (DE-1074), for refugee vessel escort duties.

=== Recapture of the SS Mayaguez ===
On 13 May, Khmer Rouge forces seized the American-owned container ship, SS Mayaguez, off Koh Tang Island, Cambodia. Both Vega and Harold E. Holt made full speed ahead for the area, while American forces soon mobilized to gain the release of the ship and its crew from the hands of the Cambodians. Arriving on the 15th, Vega stood by to provide services while Harold E. Holt moved in and delivered a detachment of the 1st Battalion 4th Marines, who boarded the container ship. While the incident was brought to a conclusion by the swift recapture of the ship and her crew, the routine task of conducting underway replenishments to ships of the 7th Fleet in southeast Asian waters continued unabated in the wake of the fall of Vietnam and Cambodia.

== Post-Vietnam War operations ==
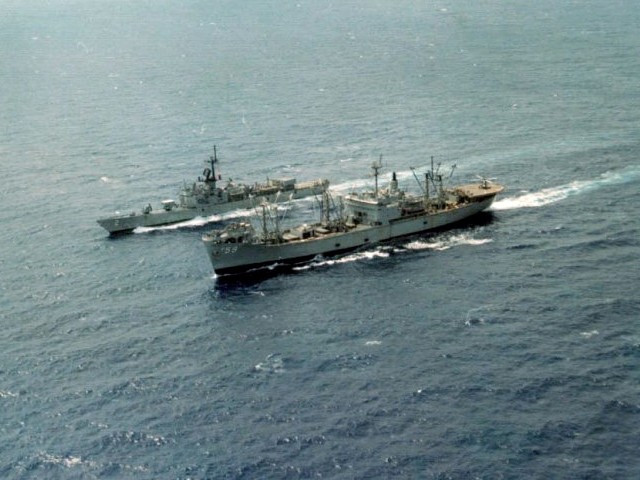
Vega and Ramsey in the Gulf of Tonkin, March 1975.

Vega returned to San Francisco, California, on 4 August, following a circuitous route via Cebu and Subic Bay, Philippines; Hong Kong, British Crown Colony; Buckner Bay, Okinawa; and Pearl Harbor. A tally of the ships' activities on her most eventful WestPac cruise showed the ship to have completed some 105 underway, 15 boat, and 38 vertical replenishments -— the last utilizing the capabilities of helicopters for rapid and increased transport of supplies from ship to ship. A total of some 2,848.9 tons of provisions, including 136.8 tons of refugee supplies, were transferred. The ship then underwent restricted availability from 18 to 19 August.

For the remainder of the ship's active service career with the United States Navy, Vega operated off the U.S. West Coast, conducting local operations, and later deployed to the Philippines, Hong Kong, Taiwan, Japan, and Okinawa for her final WestPac deployment. She arrived at San Francisco on 21 December 1976 and immediately commenced leave and upkeep.

== Inactivation and decommissioning ==
On 21 January 1977, Vega shifted to berth 23 south, Mare Island Naval Shipyard, to commence standdown prior to inactivation. She was decommissioned on 29 April 1977 and struck from the Navy list the same day. She was sold later that year, and became the unpowered fish factory ship Robert E. Resoff.

The USS Vega's steering wheel is on display in the Veterans Memorial Association's 1st floor meeting room in Eugene Oregon.

== Military awards and honors ==
Vega earned 10 battle stars for her service to units of the 7th Fleet during the Vietnam War:

- Vietnamese Defense
- Vietnamese Counteroffensive
- Vietnamese Counteroffensive - Phase II
- Vietnamese Counteroffensive - Phase III
- Vietnamese Counteroffensive - Phase IV
- Vietnamese Counteroffensive - Phase V
- Tet/69 Counteroffensive
- Vietnam Summer-Fall 1969
- Vietnamese Counteroffensive - Phase VI
- Vietnam Ceasefire

Vega’s crew was eligible for the following medals and commendations:

- Navy Meritorious Unit Commendation (2)
- National Defense Service Medal
- Armed Forces Expeditionary Medal (7-Vietnam, 2-Quemoy-Matsu, 1-Korea, 1-Op. Eagle Pull, 1-Op. Frequent Wind, 1-Mayaquezx Op.)
- Vietnam Service Medal (10)
- Humanitarian Service Medal (1-Eagle Pull, 1-Frequent Wind)
- Republic of Vietnam Campaign Medal
