= NS Savannah =

American nuclear-powered commercial ship (1959–72)

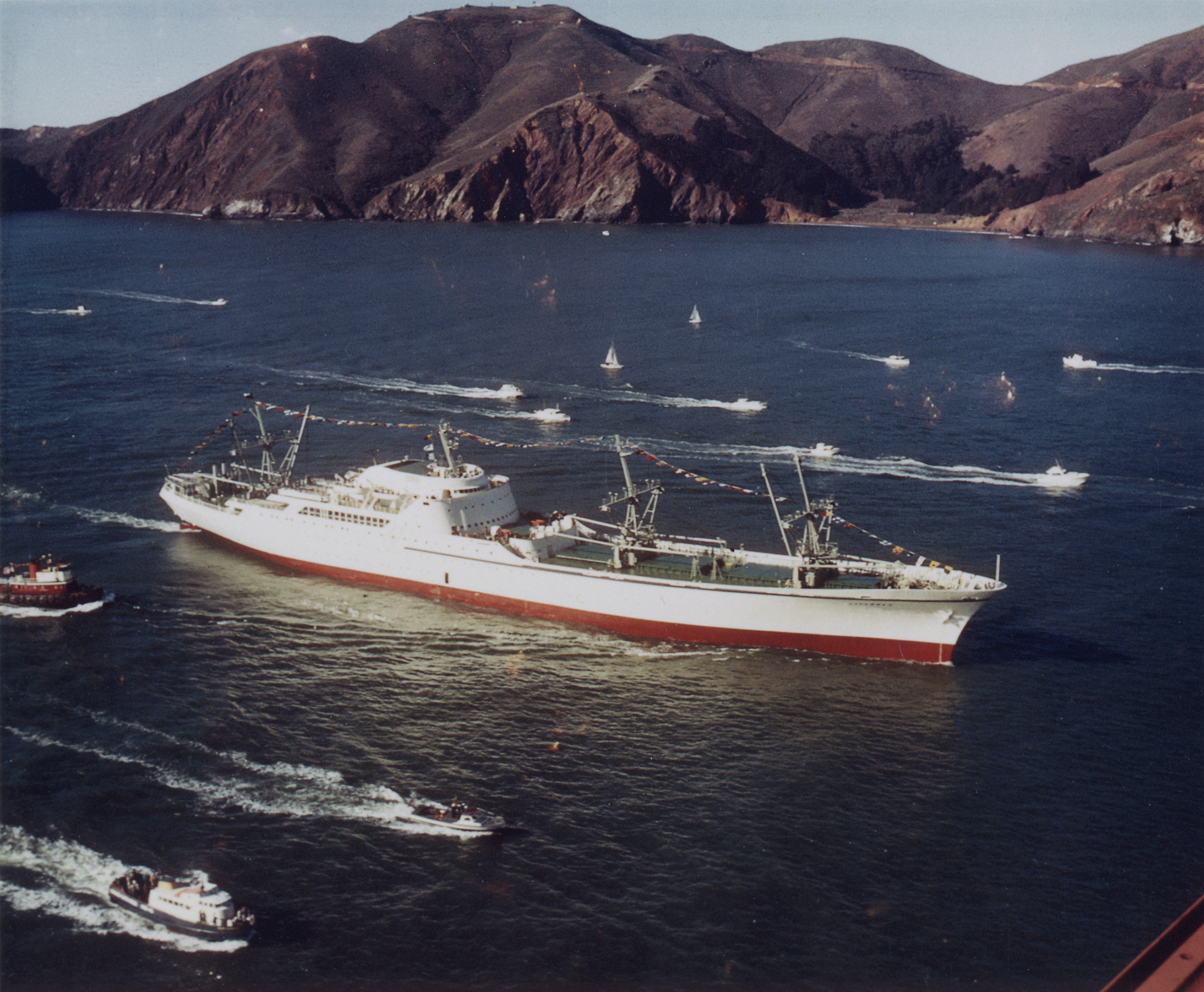
- NS Savannah reaching the Golden Gate Bridge in 1962

History

United States
- Owner: US Maritime Administration
- Operator: 1962–1965: States Marine Lines, Inc.; 1965–1972: American Export-Isbrandtsen Lines
- Port of registry: Savannah
- Ordered: 1955
- Builder: New York Shipbuilding Corporation, Camden, New Jersey, United States
- Cost: $46,900,000 ($18,600,000 for the ship, and $28,300,000 for the nuclear plant and fuel)
- Yard number: 529
- Launched: July 21, 1959
- Sponsored by: Mamie Eisenhower
- Completed: December 1961
- Acquired: May 1, 1962
- Maiden voyage: August 20, 1962
- In service: 1964
- Out of service: January 10, 1972
- Identification: IMO number: 5314793; Callsign: KSAV
- Status: Museum ship

General characteristics
- Type: Nuclear-powered cargo ship
- Tonnage: 13,599 gross register tons (GRT); 9,900 long tons deadweight (DWT)
- Length: 596 ft (181.66 m)
- Beam: 78 ft (23.77 m)
- Installed power: One 74 MW Babcock & Wilcox nuclear reactor (LEU <= 4.6%) powering two De Laval steam turbines
- Propulsion: 20,300 hp (15,100 kW) (designed) single shaft
- Speed: 21 knots (39 km/h; 24 mph) (service speed); 24 knots (44 km/h; 28 mph) (maximum speed)
- Range: 300,000 nmi (560,000 km; 350,000 mi) at 20 knots (37 km/h; 23 mph) on one single load of 32 fuel elements
- Capacity: 60 passengers; 14,040 ton cargo capacity
- Crew: 124
- Savannah (nuclear ship)
- U.S. National Register of Historic Places
- U.S. National Historic Landmark
- Location within Baltimore Location within Maryland Location within the United States
- Nearest city: Baltimore, Maryland
- Coordinates: 39°15′30.5″N 76°33′19.5″W
- Built: 1961
- Architects: George G. Sharp, Inc.; New York Ship Building Corporation
- NRHP reference No.: 82001518

Significant dates
- Added to NRHP: November 14, 1982
- Designated NHL: July 17, 1991

NS Savannah is a retired cargo ship that was the first nuclear-powered merchant ship, launched on July 21, 1959, two years after the Soviet ice-breaker Lenin, the first nuclear-powered civilian vessel. A demonstration project for the potential peacetime uses of nuclear energy, she was built in the late 1950s at a cost of $46.9 million (including a $28.3 million nuclear reactor and fuel core). Savannah was given the new designation "NS" for "Nuclear Ship", replacing the traditional commercial vessel prefix "SS" for "Screw Steamer", and was named after SS Savannah, the first steamship to cross the Atlantic Ocean. She was funded by United States government agencies as part of President Dwight D. Eisenhower's 1955 "Atoms for Peace" program, and was in service between 1962 and 1972 as one of only four nuclear-powered cargo ships ever built.

Savannah was deactivated in 1971 and after several moves was moored at Pier 13 of the Canton Marine Terminal in Baltimore, Maryland in 2008.

== Origin ==
In 1955, President Dwight D. Eisenhower proposed building a nuclear-powered merchant ship as a showcase for his "Atoms for Peace" initiative. The next year, the United States Congress authorized Savannah as a joint project of the Atomic Energy Commission, the Maritime Administration (MARAD), and the Department of Commerce.

She was designed by George G. Sharp, Incorporated, of New York City. Her keel was laid down by the New York Shipbuilding Corporation at Camden, New Jersey. Her nuclear reactor was designed and manufactured by Babcock & Wilcox. She was christened by U.S. First Lady Mamie Eisenhower at the ship's launching on July 21, 1959.

In 1969, Savannah became the first nuclear-powered ship to dock in New York City. She was a centerpiece for a citywide information festival called "Nuclear Week In New York". Thousands of people toured Savannah and attended related special events. These included demonstrations of advancements in peaceful uses of atomic energy, such as food products preserved by radiation, new applications for technology and many information and education programs. The Tonight Show Starring Johnny Carson featured "Nuclear Week In New York" on two programs. Dr. Glenn T. Seaborg, Chairman of the Atomic Energy Commission, was the featured speaker and President Eisenhower was honoured for his introduction of the global Atoms for Peace program. The appearance of Savannah and the Nuclear Week festival program was designed and implemented by Charles Yulish Associates and supported by contributions from leading energy companies.

=== Concept ===
Eisenhower desired a "peace ship" that would serve as an ambassador for the peaceful use of atomic power. According to an Eisenhower administration statement to Congress, "The President seeks no return on this vessel except the goodwill of men everywhere ... Neither will the vessel be burdened by proving itself commercially feasible by carrying goods exclusively." Although initial proposals used a copy of USS Nautilus's power plant, a conscious decision was made to design a propulsion system to commercial design standards with no connection to military programs.

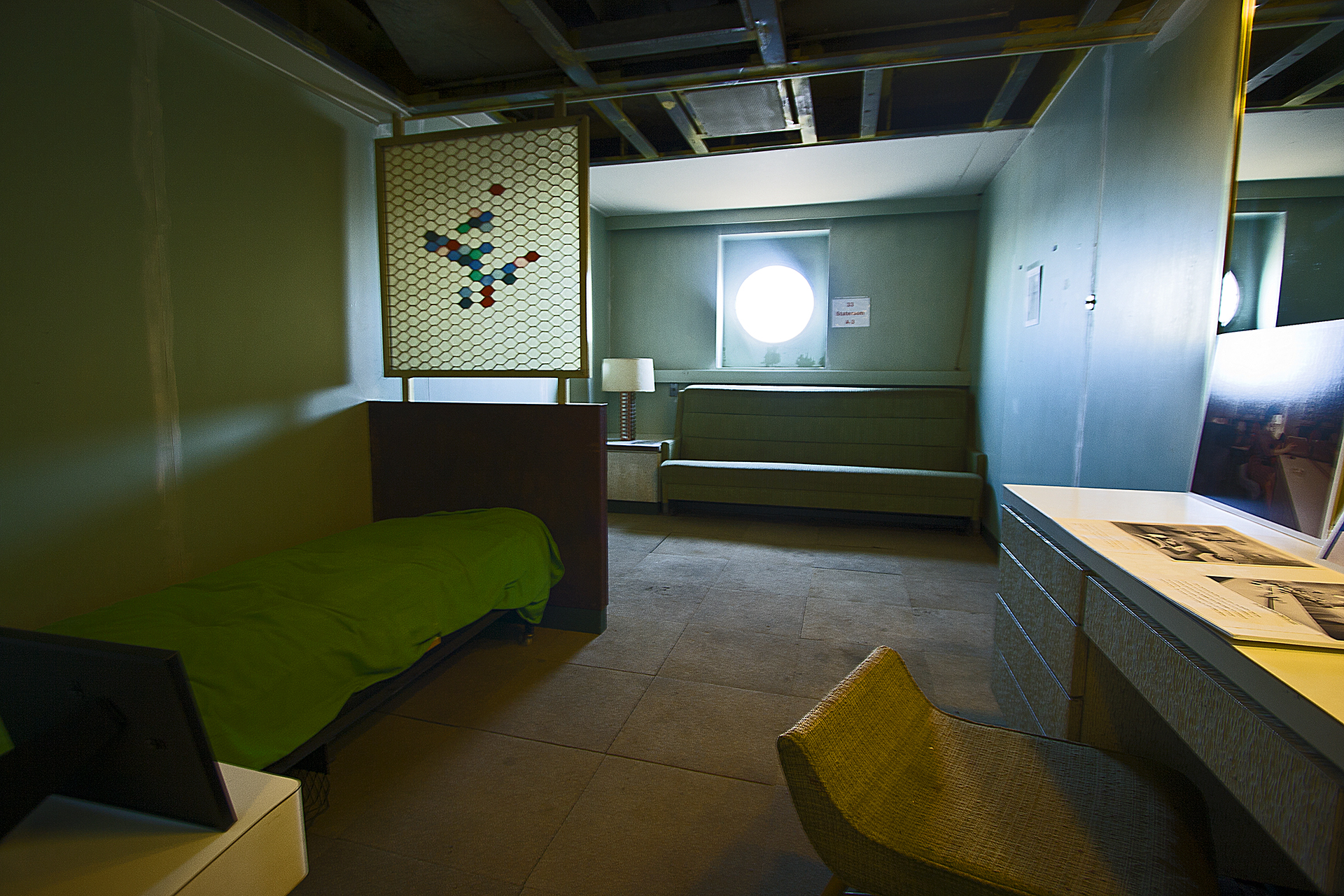
Partly restored passenger stateroom

George G. Sharp, Inc., a prominent naval architecture firm in New York City founded in 1920, was responsible for all of Savannah's design but the Babcock & Wilcox nuclear reactor. Savannah was the sixth large ship to have fin stabilizers, intended to enhance the safety of the reactor and improve passenger comfort. Since the reactor occupied the center of the ship and required clear overhead crane access during refueling, the superstructure was set far back on the hull. The raked, teardrop-shaped superstructure was specifically designed by George G. Sharp's ship design consultant Jack Heaney and Associates of Wilton, Connecticut, for a futuristic appearance, decorated with stylized atom graphics on either side. Heaney was responsible for the interiors, which featured sleek modern "Atomic Age" styling.

== Description ==
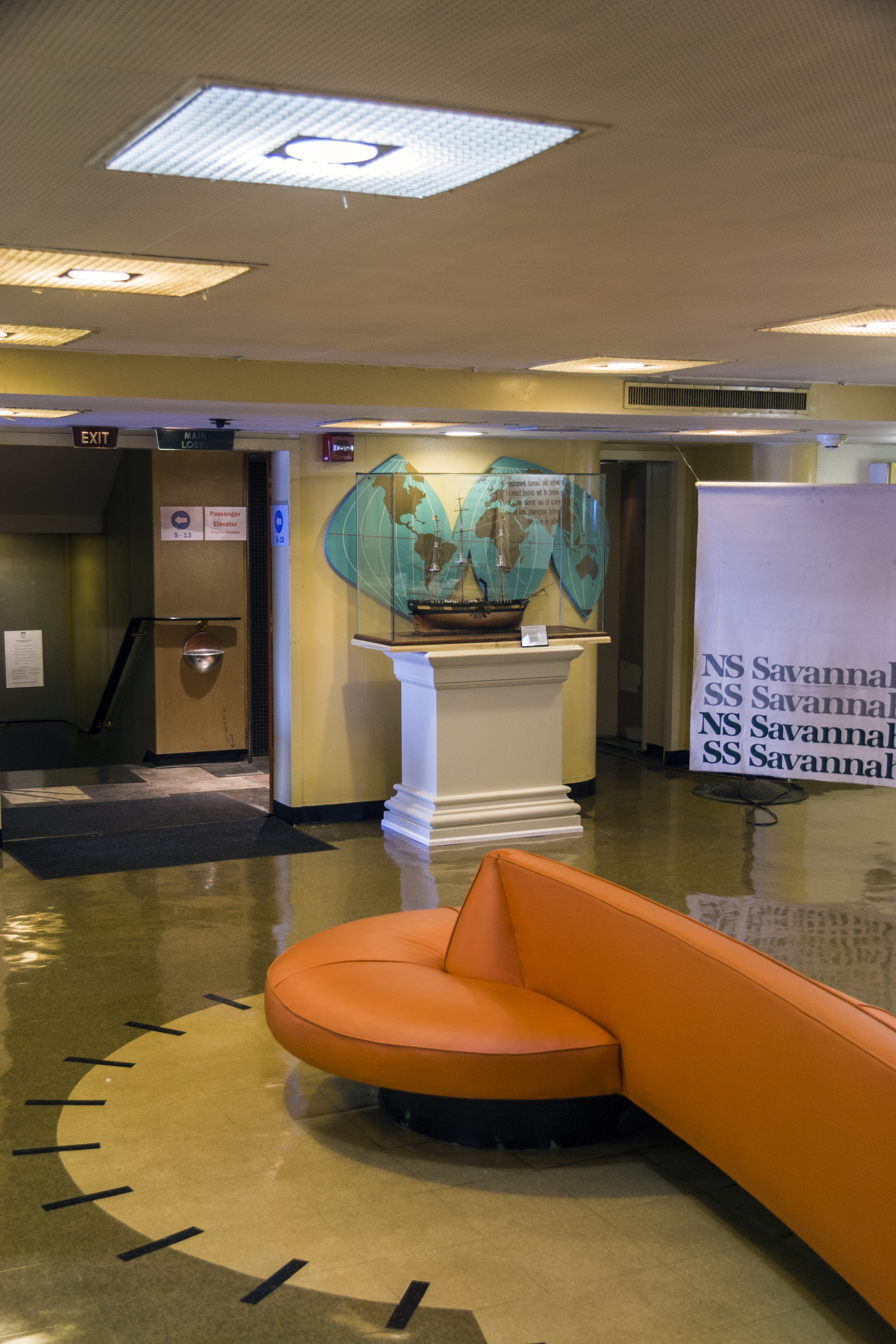
Main lobby in 2012

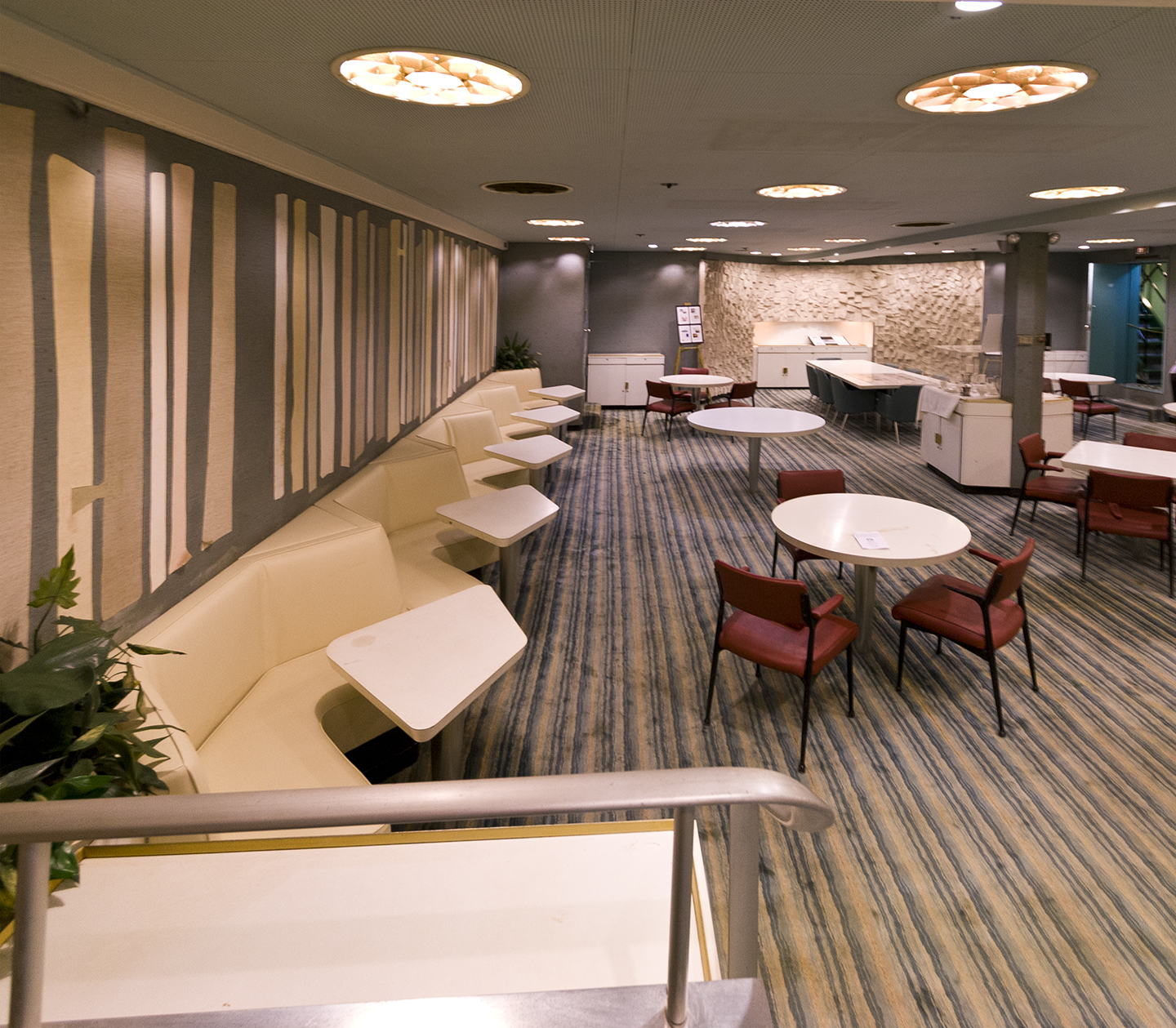
Dining room

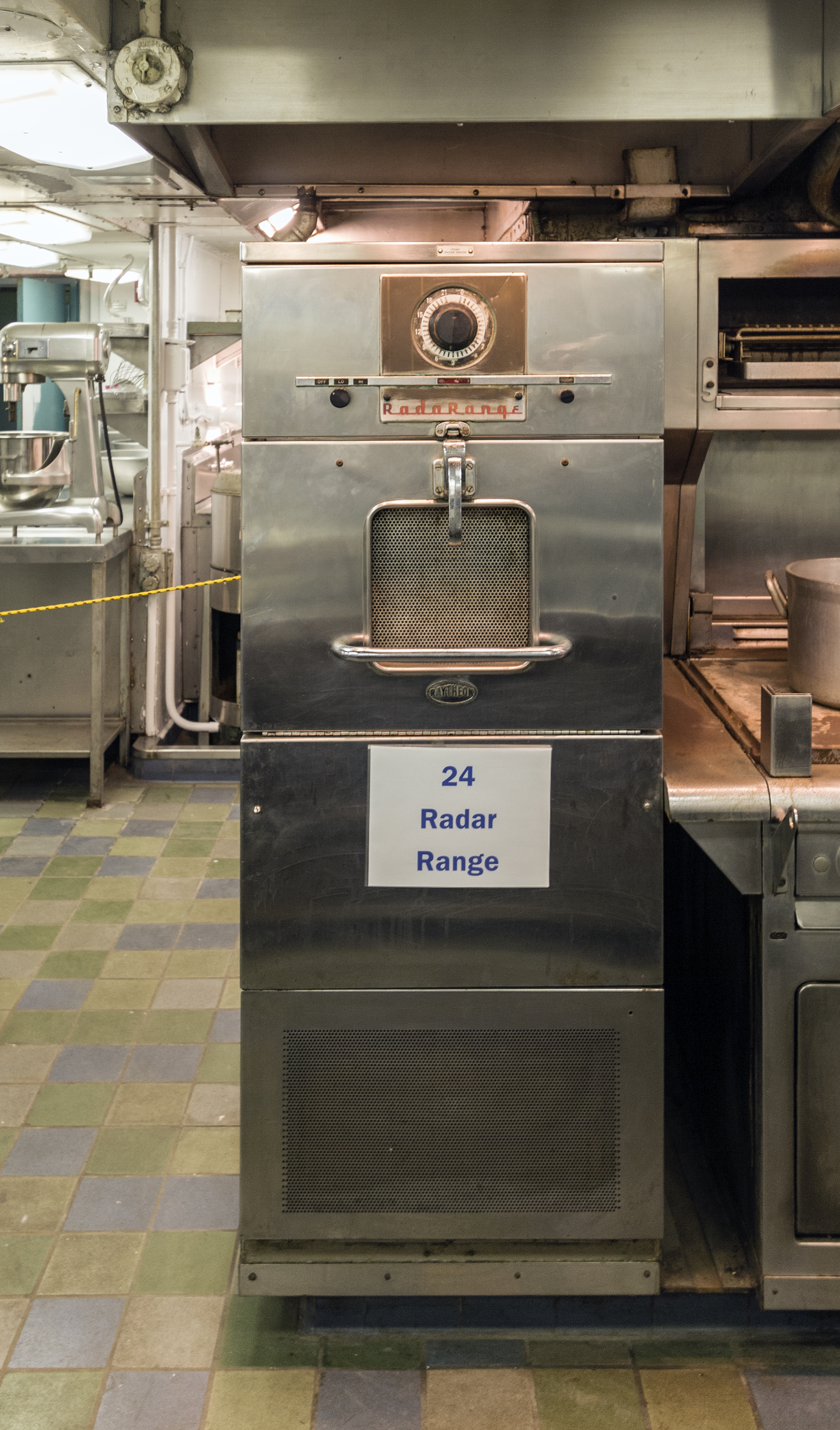
A Raytheon Radarange microwave oven aboard NS Savannah, installed c. 1961

Savannah measures 596 feet 6 inches (181.81 m) in length and 78 feet (24 m) in beam, with a loaded draft of 29 feet 6 inches (8.99 m), and a loaded displacement of 21,800 short tons (19,800 t). Savannah was built with seven cargo holds, a reactor compartment and a machinery compartment, making nine water-tight compartments. There are three full decks. The reactor compartment is located near the center of the ship, with the superstructure just aft of the reactor top to allow the reactor to be refuelled. Holds 1 through 4 are forward of the superstructure, with cargo handling gear between 1 and 2 and between 3 and 4. Cargo hold 5 is served by side ports, as it is located beneath the swimming pool. Holds 6 and 7 are aft of the superstructure.

The topmost deck of the superstructure comprises the pilothouse, radio room, chart room, a battery room and an emergency diesel generator. The next lower deck comprises the officers' accommodations, with an officers' lounge at the tapering rear portion of the superstructure. Below this level is the promenade deck comprising, from forward aft, the elliptical main lounge, the main stair and elevator, and the Veranda Lounge. The bar was provided with enclosed walkways outboard, and a glass wall overlooking the swimming pool and promenade deck aft. A dance floor was provided in the center of the lounge, surrounded by tables with illuminated glass tops. The back bar features a glass and metal sculptural interpretation of the periodic table of the elements.

"A" Deck is the first full deck level, with cargo handling facilities fore and aft. Deck surfaces have been retrofitted with cargo container anchors. The interior of "A" Deck contains the main lobby and purser's office, the infirmary, barber, beautician and steward's facilities, as well as the health physics laboratory intended to monitor the effects of the nuclear reactor. All thirty passenger cabins are located on "A" Deck, each with a private bath and accommodations for one to three passengers.

"B" Deck contains the ship's kitchen and the dining room. The 75-seat dining room features a curved wall sculpture entitled "Fission" by Pierre Bourdelle. At the opposite end of the dining room a metal model of the SS Savannah is set in a glass panel. The overhead light fixtures are screened with brass bands representing stylized atoms. The kitchen features an early water-cooled Raytheon Radarange microwave oven. "B" Deck also includes crew quarters and the crew mess and lounge.

"C" Deck comprises more crew quarters, the laundry and a butcher's shop. A glassed-in central gallery provides a view of the main engine room. A pressure door provides access to the upper levels of the reactor compartment.

"D" Deck houses the machinery spaces, cargo holds and the nuclear reactor.

=== Reactor ===
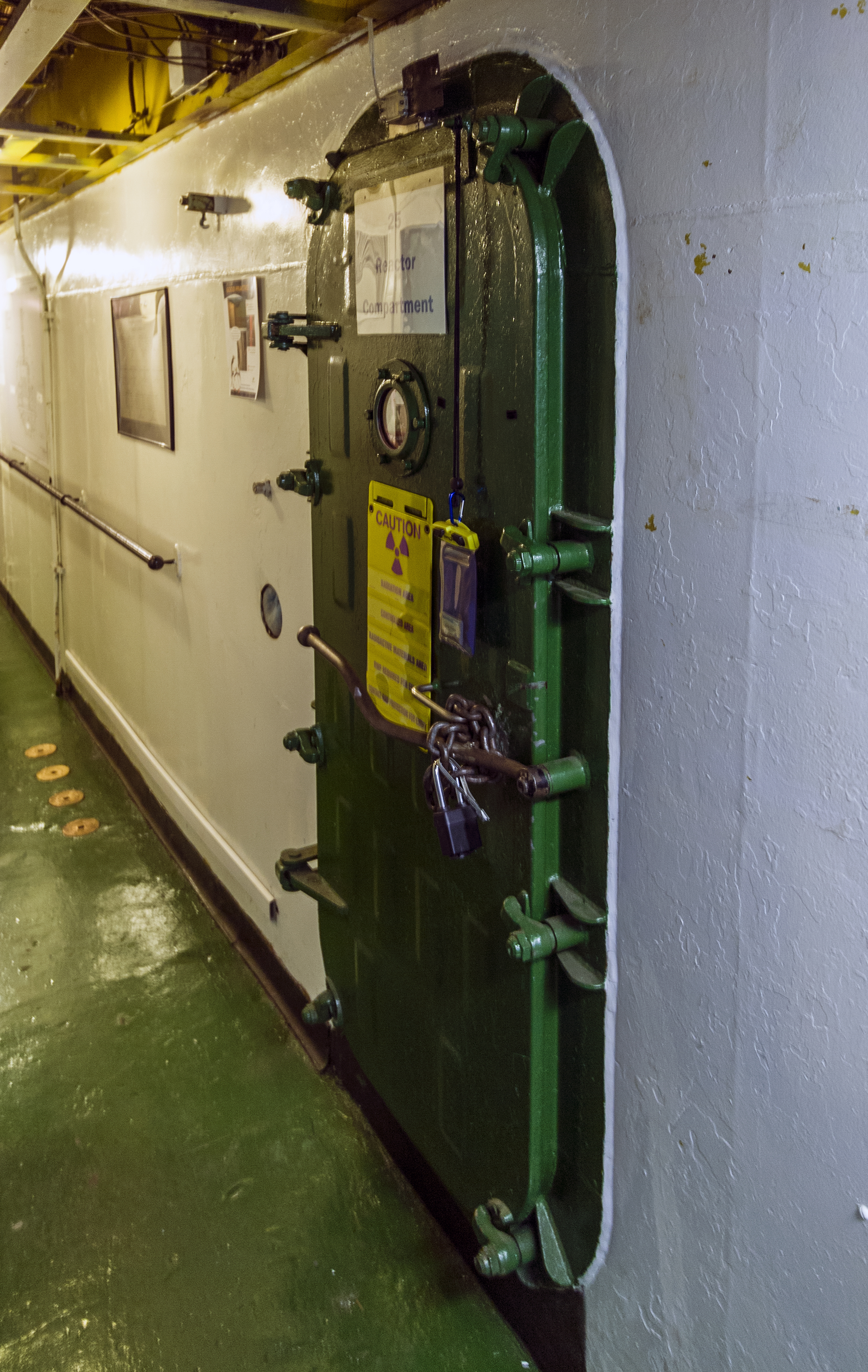
Reactor compartment door

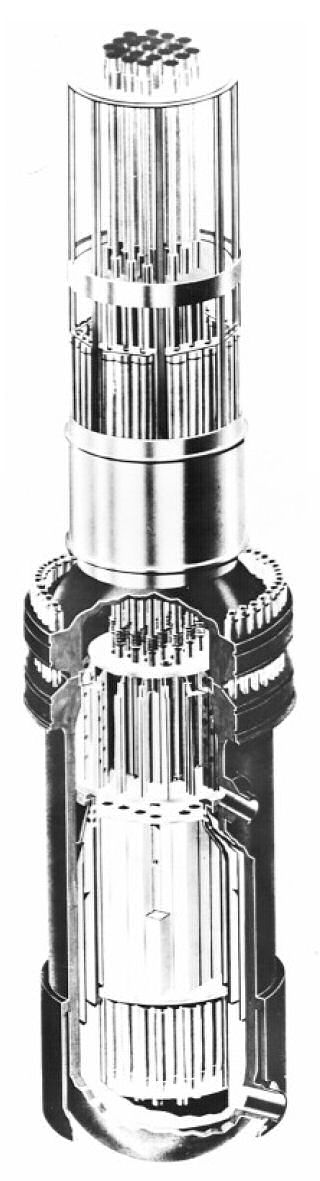
The pressurized water reactor of NS Savannah

Savannah's reactor was designed to civilian standards using low-enriched uranium with less emphasis on shock resistance and compactness of design than that seen in comparable military propulsion reactors, but with considerable emphasis on safety and reliability.

The reactor was placed to allow for access from above for refuelling. The 74 MW reactor is a tall, narrow cylinder, housed in a cylindrical containment vessel with rounded ends and a 14-foot-diameter (4.3 m) vertical cylindrical projection housing the control rods and refuelling equipment. The 50-foot-long (15 m) containment vessel houses the pressurized-water reactor, the primary coolant loop and the steam generator. The steel vessel has a wall thickness varying from 2 1/2–4 inches (65–100 mm), designed to accommodate the 186 psi (1.28 MPa) gauge pressure generated by a ruptured primary coolant pipe. There are two 42-inch-diameter (110 cm) manholes in the top of the containment vessel. Two 24-by-18-inch (61 cm × 46 cm) manholes in the bottom of the containment vessel are designed to admit water to the containment vessel if the ship sinks in more than 100 ft (30 m) of water to prevent the pressure vessel's collapse. The containment vessel was not occupied under operational conditions, but could be accessed within 30 minutes of reactor shut-down. The lower half of the containment vessel is shielded by a 4-foot (1.2 m) concrete barrier. The upper half is shielded by 6 in (15 cm) of lead and 6 in (15 cm) of polyethylene. A collision mat shields the sides of the vessel with alternating layers of 1-inch (2.5 cm) steel and 3 in (8 cm) of redwood in a 24-inch (61 cm) assembly.

The reactor was de-fuelled in 1975. It was removed and taken to Utah for disposal in November 2022. The reactor was 17 ft (5.2 m) high with a core 62 in (160 cm) in diameter and 66 in (170 cm) high, with 32 fuel elements. Each fuel element contains 164 fuel rods with a stainless steel cladding. Each fuel rod was 1/2 in (13 mm) in diameter and housed uranium oxide pellets enriched to an average of 4.4% U-235. The 16 center elements were enriched to 4.2%, and the outer 16 elements to 4.6%. The pellets were 0.4244 in (10.78 mm) in diameter, with pressurized helium gas in the annular space between the pellets and the element walls. Twenty-one control rods were provided, 66 in (170 cm) long, 8 in (20 cm) across and 3/8 in (9.5 mm) thick. The rods could be fully inserted in 1.6 seconds by electric drive.

=== Machinery ===
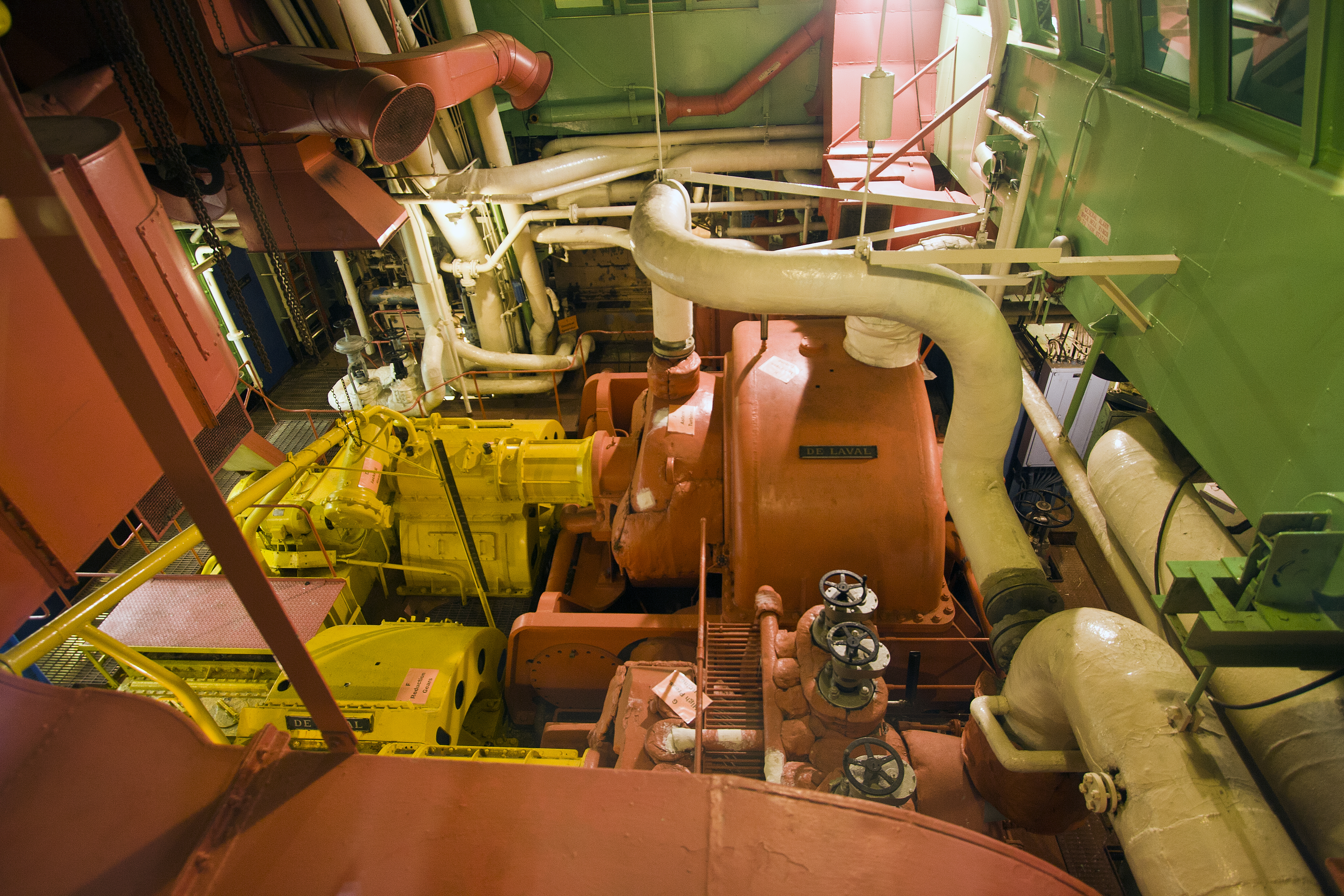
Main machinery room

The main machinery room measures 55 feet (17 meters) long by 78 ft (24 m) wide and 32 ft (10 m) high. The main control room is immediately aft of the machinery room, from which engineers controlled both the reactor and the steam propulsion plant. A window separates the control room from the machinery room. The control room is visible from the viewing gallery on "C" Deck above. The steam plant is a relatively standard steam plant in its general characteristics, with a nine-stage high-pressure turbine and a 7-stage low-pressure turbine driving a single propeller shaft. The steam and water chemistry program was set up and managed by the Bull & Roberts Company to match the systems it provided for US Navy nuclear-powered aircraft carriers and submarines. The turbines were specially adapted to use the saturated steam typically provided by a nuclear power source. It was also unusual in having a 750-horsepower (560-kilowatt) electric motor geared to the high-pressure turbine for use in an emergency. The motor was driven by either the ship's steam turbogenerators or the 750 kW emergency diesel generators located in the rear of the pilothouse. These generators could provide basic propulsion to the motor while running the reactor coolant pumps. The motor was upgraded to provide greater torque and reversibility to allow it to move the ship away from a pier in the event of a reactor accident.

The propulsion plant's designed capacity was 20,000 horsepower (15 MW) for a design speed of 20 knots (37 km/h). Actual performance yielded about 22,000 horsepower (16 MW) and a maximum speed of 24 kn (44 km/h).

== Economics of nuclear propulsion ==
Savannah was a demonstration of the technical feasibility of nuclear propulsion for merchant ships and was not expected to be commercially competitive. She was designed to be visually impressive, looking more like a luxury yacht than a bulk cargo vessel, and was equipped with thirty air-conditioned staterooms, each with an individual bathroom, a dining facility for 100 passengers, a lounge that could double as a movie theatre, a veranda, a swimming pool and a library. Even her cargo-handling equipment was designed to look good. By many measures, the ship was a success. She performed well at sea, her safety record was impressive, and her gleaming white paint was never smudged by exhaust smoke, except when running the diesel generator. From 1965 to 1971, the Maritime Administration leased Savannah to American Export-Isbrandtsen Lines for revenue cargo service.

However, Savannah's cargo space was limited to 8,500 short tons (7,700 tonnes) of freight in 652,000 cubic feet (18,500 m^{3}). Many of her competitors could accommodate several times as much. Her streamlined hull made loading the forward holds laborious, which became a significant disadvantage as ports became more and more automated. Her crew was a third larger than comparable oil-fired ships and received special training in addition to that required for conventional maritime licenses. Because of these special licensing requirements, the Maritime Administration established a Nuclear Engineer Program at the United States Merchant Marine Academy to provide officers specifically trained in nuclear marine engineering.

Additionally, labour disputes erupted over a disparity in pay scales between deck officers and nuclear engineering officers. The pay issue continued to be a problem, so the Maritime Administration canceled its contract with States Marine Lines and selected American Export-Isbrandtsen Lines as the new ship operator. A new crew was trained, delaying further use for almost a year.

As a result of her design handicaps, training requirements, and additional crew members, Savannah cost approximately US$2 million a year more in operating subsidies than a similarly sized Mariner-class ship with a conventional oil-fired steam plant. The Maritime Administration placed her out of service in 1971 to save costs, a decision that made sense when fuel oil cost US$20 per ton. In 1974, however, when fuel oil cost $80 per ton, Savannah's operating costs would have been no greater than a conventional cargo ship. This figure does not factor maintenance and eventual disposal of the ship's nuclear power plant. The ship's namesake, SS Savannah, which in 1819 became the first steam powered ship to cross the Atlantic Ocean, was also a commercial failure despite the innovation in marine propulsion technology.

== Nuclear refueling, waste disposal and decommissioning ==
During her initial year of operation, Savannah released over 115,000 U.S. gallons (440,000 liters) of very low-level radioactive waste at sea, having substantially exceeded her storage capacity of 10,000 US gallons (38,000 L). The Nuclear Servicing Vessel Atomic Servant was built to receive waste from Savannah. The unpowered barge featured a fuel storage pit for a replacement fuel and control rod assembly, lined by 12 inches (30 cm) of lead. Atomic Servant was made available to service Savannah anywhere in the world.

The radioactive primary coolant loop water was removed at the time of shut-down, as were some of the more radioactive components within the reactor system. The secondary loop water was removed at the same time. Residual radioactivity in 1976 was variously estimated as between 60,000 and 168,000 curies (2,200 and 6,200 terabecquerels), mostly iron 55 (2.4-year half-life) and cobalt 60 (5.2-year half-life). By 2005, the residual radioactivity had declined to 4,800 curies (180 terabecquerels). Residual radiation in 2011 was stated to be very low. The reactor and the ship will be regulated until 2031.

== Service history ==
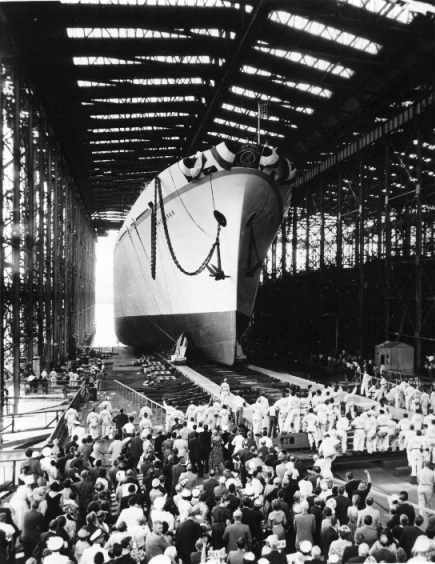
Launch of Savannah, July 21, 1959

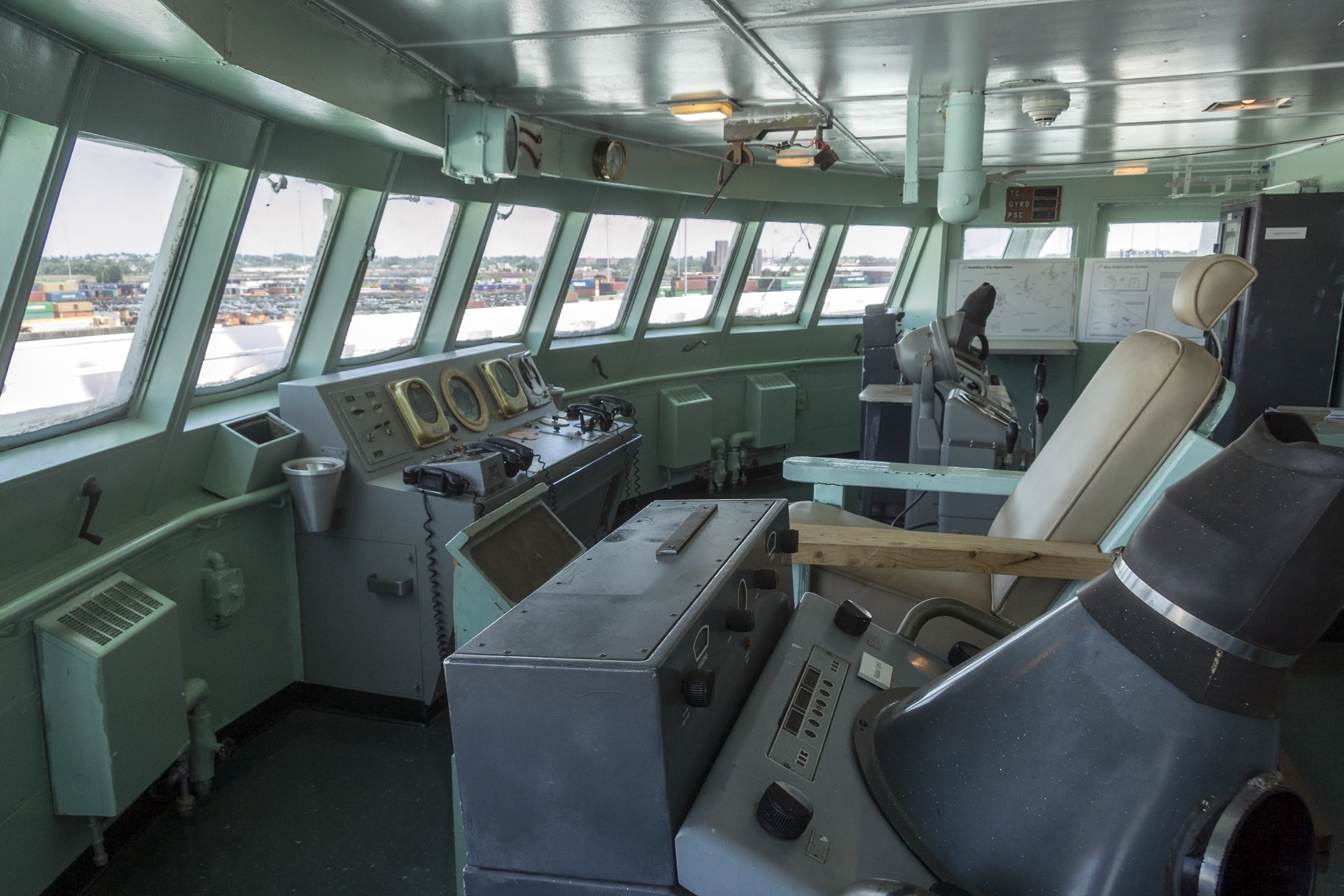
Navigation bridge

After christening on July 21, 1959, it took another 2 1/2 years to complete the reactor installation and initial trials before the ship was moved to Yorktown, Virginia, under temporary oil-fired power, where the reactor was started and tested. Full reactor power was achieved in April 1962. Savannah was delivered on May 1, 1962, to the Maritime Administration and turned over to her operators, the States Marine Lines. On her maiden voyage beginning on August 20, 1962, Savannah undertook demonstrations, first sailing to Savannah, her home port. During this trip a faulty instrument initiated a reactor shutdown, which was misreported as a major accident in the press. From there she passed through the Panama Canal and visited Hawaii and ports on the west coast of the United States, becoming a popular exhibit for three weeks at the Century 21 Exposition in Seattle. By early 1963, she arrived in Galveston, Texas, for repair and system checks. There, a dispute over the compensation of nuclear-qualified engineering officers led to a reactor shutdown and strike by the nuclear engineering crew. The contract with States Marine Lines was canceled and a new operator, American Export-Isbrandtsen Lines, was selected, requiring a new crew to be trained. This involved a switch to non-union crew, which became a lingering issue in the staffing of proposed future nuclear ships.

By 1964, Savannah started a tour of the US Gulf and east coast ports under the command of captain Gaston R. De Groote. During the summer she crossed the Atlantic for the first time, visiting Bremerhaven, Hamburg, Rotterdam, Dublin and Southampton. 150,000 people toured the ship during this tour.

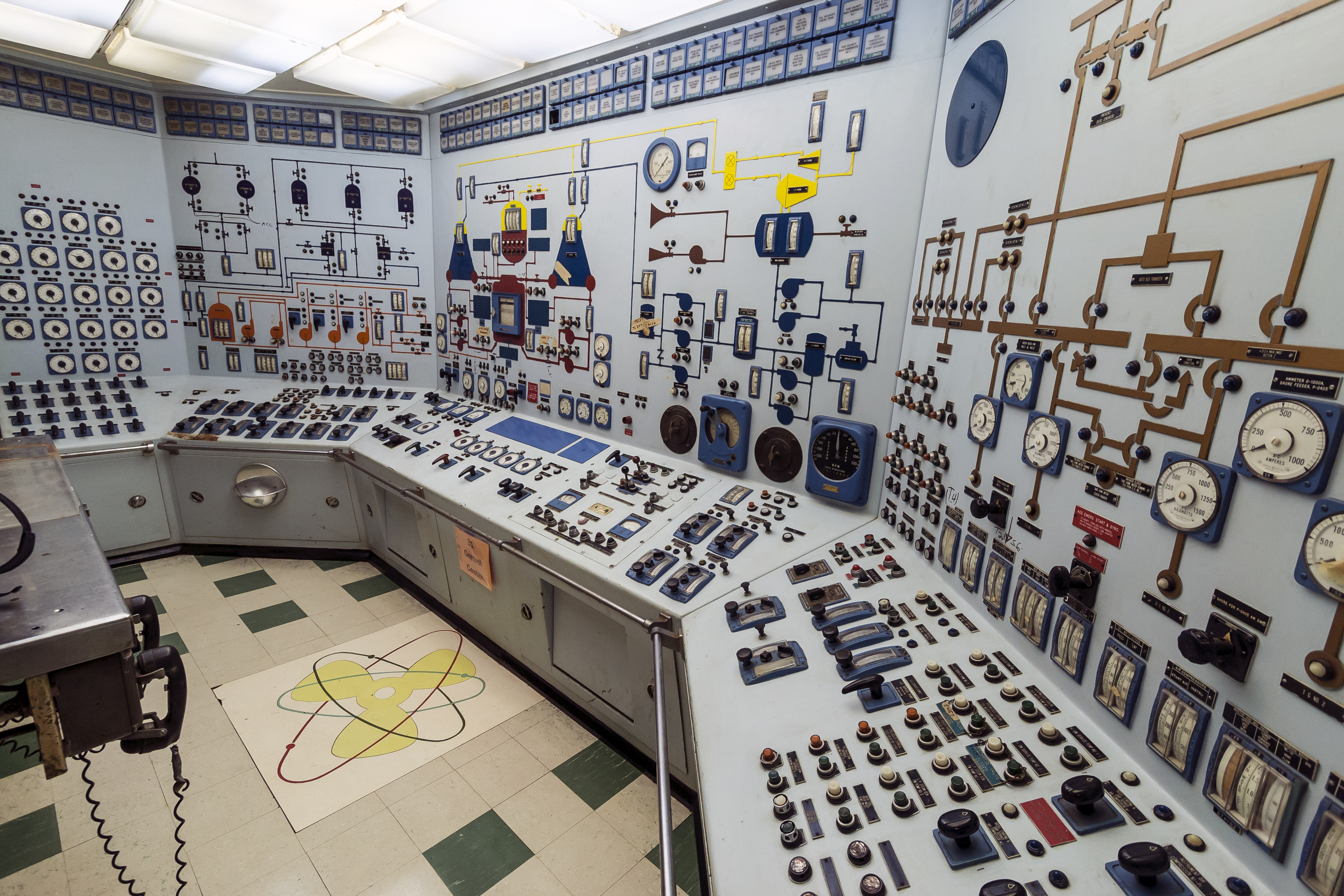
Savannah's control room

Savannah served as a passenger-cargo liner until 1965, when passenger service was discontinued. By this time a total of 848 passengers had been carried along with 4,800 short tons (4,400 tonnes) of cargo. The ship was converted to all-cargo use, with the removal of 1,800 tons of ballast. Passenger spaces were closed. Savannah operated for three years and traveled 350,000 nautical miles (650,000 km) before returning to Galveston for refueling. Four of the 32 fuel assemblies were replaced and the remaining units rearranged to even out fuel usage. She resumed service until the end of 1971, when she was deactivated.

During her active career, Savannah traveled 450,000 nautical miles (830,000 km), visiting 45 foreign and 32 domestic ports and was visited by 1.4 million people in her function as an Atoms for Peace project. Savannah's presence also eased access for nuclear-powered naval ships in foreign ports, though the ship was excluded from ports in Australia, New Zealand and Japan.

Following her removal from active service, Savannah was first obtained by the City of Savannah and was docked at the end of River Street (near the Talmadge Memorial Bridge), with plans for eventually making her a floating hotel. However, investors could not be found. For a short period of time during the late 1970s she was stored in Galveston, Texas, and was a familiar sight to many travelers on State Highway 87 as they crossed Bolivar Roads on the free ferry service operated by the Texas Department of Highways.

== Museum ship ==
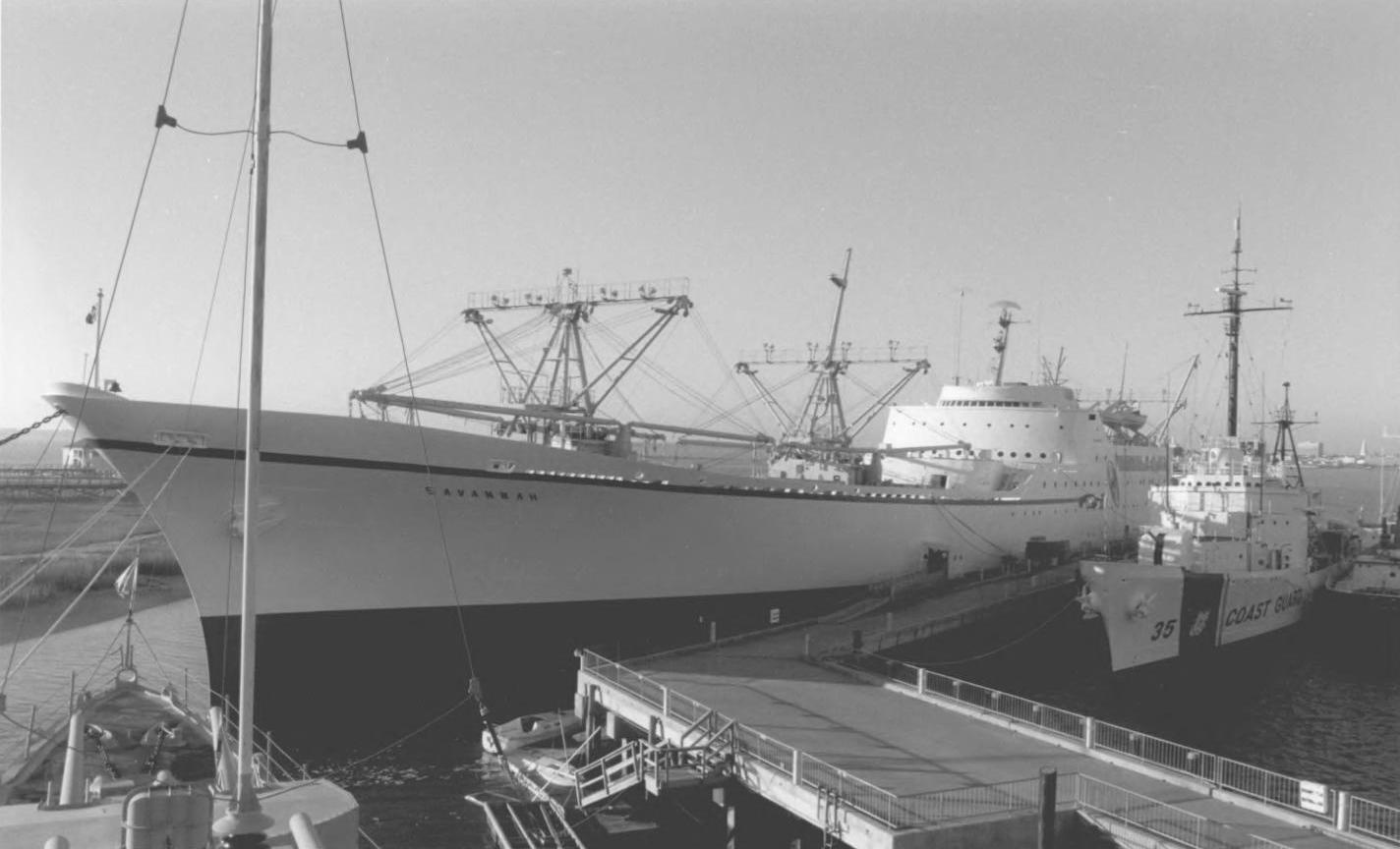
Savannah at Patriots Point Naval and Maritime Museum, South Carolina in 1990

In 1981, Savannah was obtained via bareboat charter for display at the Patriots Point Naval and Maritime Museum near Mount Pleasant, South Carolina. Although the museum had use of the vessel, ownership of Savannah remained with the Maritime Administration, and the Patriots Point Development Authority had to be designated a "co-licensee" for the ship's reactor. Periodic radiological inspections were also necessary to ensure the continued safety of the ship. Once Savannah was open for display, visitors could tour the ship's cargo holds, view the engine room from an observation area, look into staterooms and passenger areas, and walk the ship's decks.

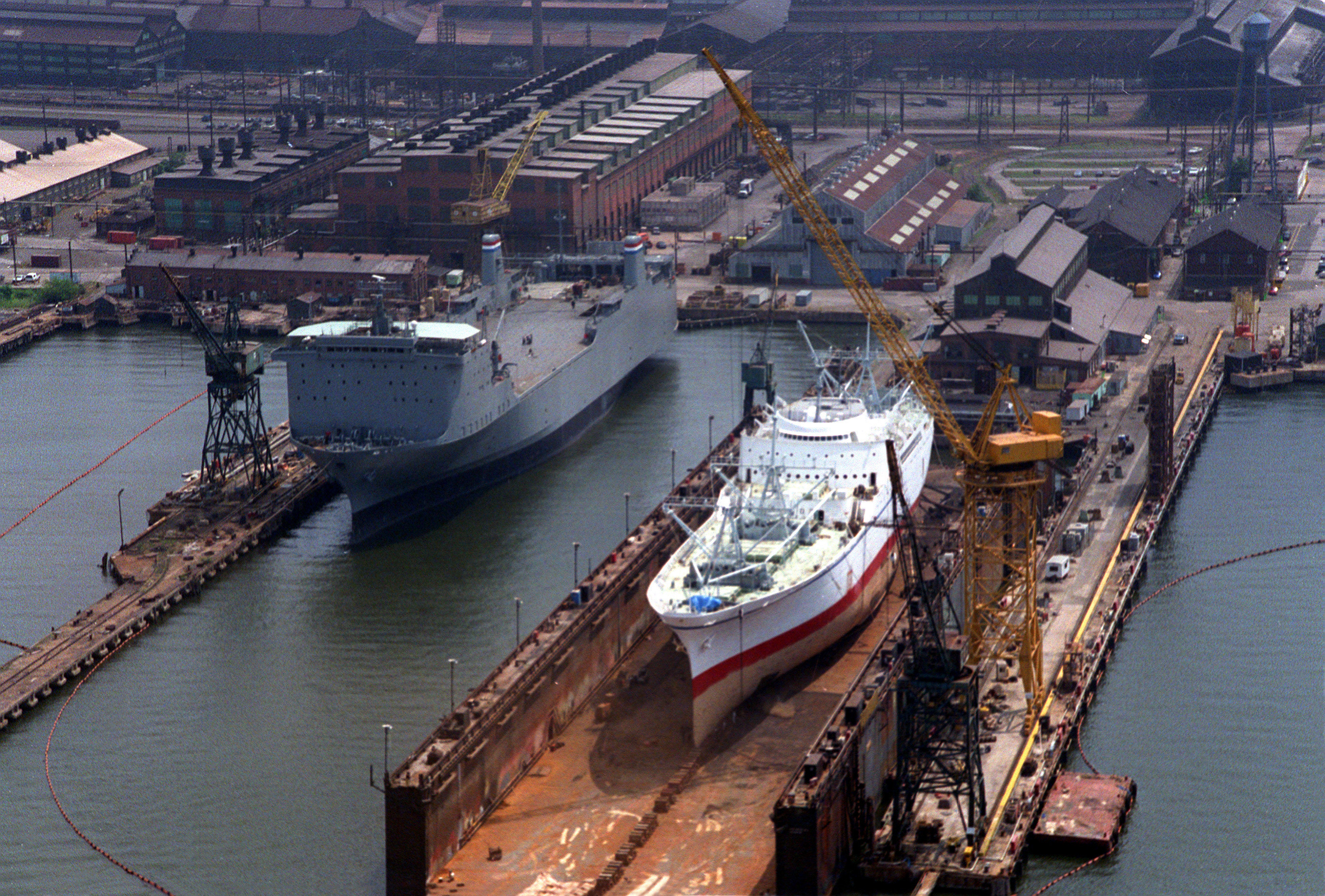
Savannah dry docked at Sparrows Point, Baltimore, July 1994

The museum had hoped to recondition and improve the ship's public spaces for visitors, but these plans never materialized. Savannah never drew the visitors that the museum's other ships, notably the aircraft carrier Yorktown, did. When a periodic MARAD inspection in 1993 indicated a need to dry dock Savannah, Patriots Point and the Maritime Administration agreed to terminate the ship's charter in 1994. The ship was moved from the museum and dry docked in Baltimore, Maryland, in 1994 for repairs, after which she was moved to the James River Merchant Marine Reserve Fleet near Newport News, Virginia.

The Maritime Administration had not yet funded decommissioning and removal of the ship's nuclear systems. Savannah had undergone work at Colonna's Shipyard of Norfolk, Virginia, beginning August 15, 2006. That $995,000 job included exterior structural and lighting repairs, removing shipboard cranes and wiring, refurbishing water-damaged interior spaces, and removing mold, mildew, and painting some of the interior. On January 30, 2007, she was towed to Pier 23, which is owned by the City of Newport News. On May 8, 2008, Savannah arrived in Baltimore under tow. Savannah remains in Baltimore through under a U.S. Maritime Administration contract with the Vane Brothers' Co. at the Canton Marine Terminal in the Canton section of Baltimore.

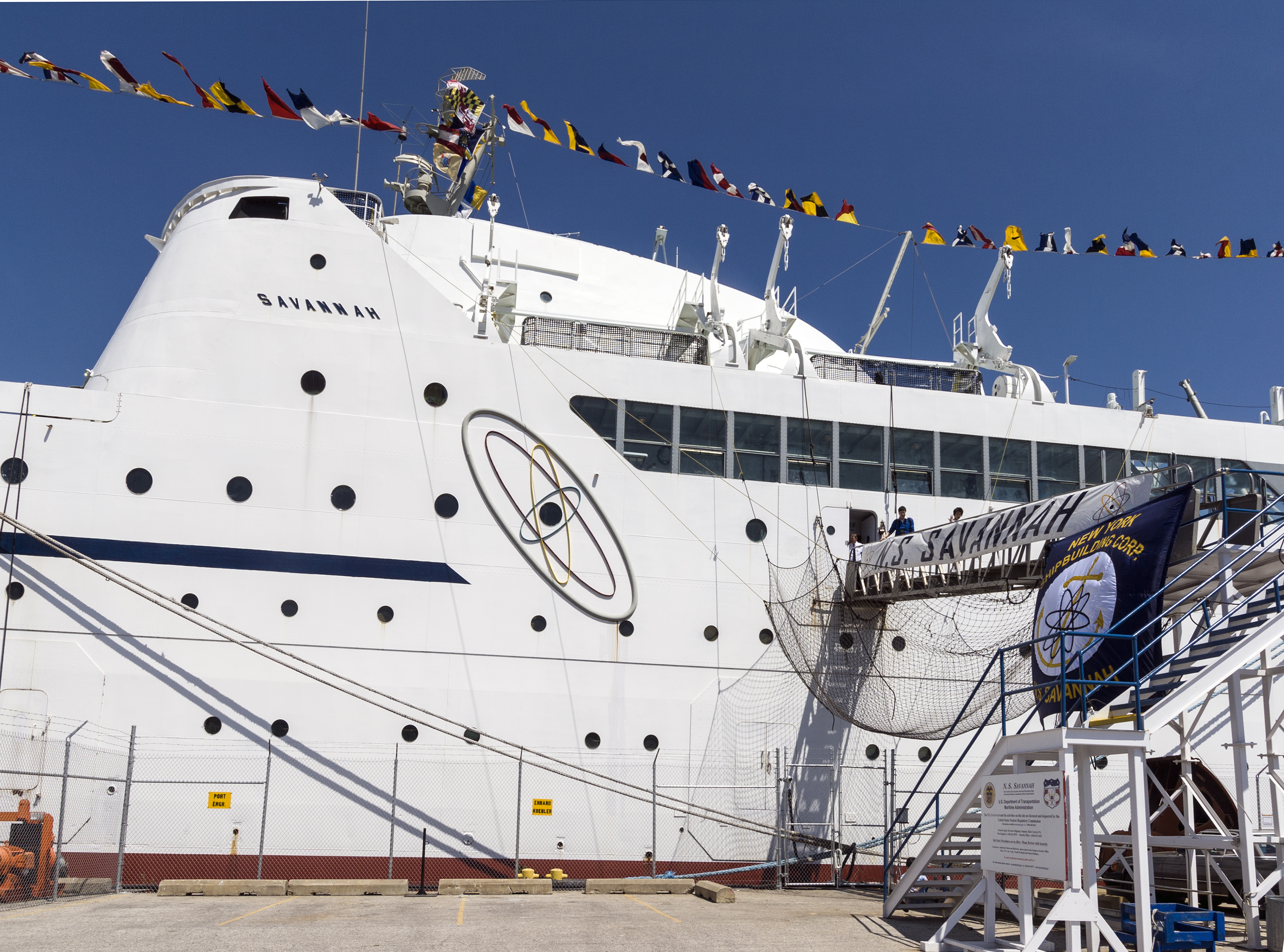
Savannah at Pier 13 in Baltimore in 2012

Since Savannah is historically significant and has been designated a National Historic Landmark, MARAD has expressed interest in offering the ship for preservation once Savannah's decommissioning, decontamination and radiological work is completed. A MARAD spokesman told The Baltimore Sun in May 2008 that the maritime agency envisions the ship's eventual conversion into a museum, but that no investors have yet offered to undertake the project.

While still under a long-term contract with Canton Marine Terminal, NS Savannah was towed via C&D canal to Philadelphia for drydock maintenance and pre-decommission work in early September 2019. She arrived to drydock at the Navy Yard in Philadelphia on September 10, 2019. Pre-decommission work is to include removal of nuclear support systems and other mechanical components leading up to the removal of the reactor. Decommissioning must be accomplished by 2031. By mid-February 2020, the ship had returned to Baltimore.

On December 4, 2023, the Maritime Administration of the Department of Transportation (MARAD) announced in the Federal Register that it is decommissioning the nuclear power plant of the Nuclear Ship Savannah (NSS), which would result in the termination of the ship's Nuclear Regulatory Commission (NRC) license, making the ship available for disposition, including potential conveyance or preservation. MARAD had announced a site visit to take place on December 16 and 17, 2023. The site visit was to provide interested parties an opportunity to learn more about the NSS to assist in determining if they may wish to consider acquiring the ship for preservation purposes, as prescribed in the recently executed Programmatic Agreement (PA) covering the decommissioning and disposition of the ship.

== Historic designation ==
Savannah was listed on the National Register of Historic Places on November 14, 1982. She was designated a National Historic Landmark on July 17, 1991, in advance of the customary fifty-year age requirement because of her exceptional national significance as one of the most visible and intact examples of the Atoms for Peace program.

== See also ==
- Nuclear marine propulsion § Civilian nuclear ships
- Nuclear power
- United States Merchant Marine Academy
