= Trip =

Trip may refer to:

== Arts and entertainment ==
=== Fictional characters ===
- Trip (Pokémon), a Pokémon character
- Trip (Power Rangers), in the American television series Time Force Power Rangers
- Trip, in the 2013 film Metallica Through the Never
- Trip, in the video game Enslaved: Odyssey to the West
- Trip the Sungazer, in the video game Sonic Superstars
- Trip Fontaine, in the novel The Virgin Suicides
- Trip Tucker, in the television series Star Trek: Enterprise

=== Film and television ===
==== Films ====
- The Trip (1967 film), an American film directed by Roger Corman
- The Trip (2002 film), an American gay romance film
- A Trip, a 2011 Slovenian film
- Trip (film), a 2021 Indian Tamil-language film
- The Trip (2021 film), a Norwegian action-comedy film

==== Television ====
===== Series =====
- The Trip (1999 TV series), a British documentary series
- The Trip (2010 TV series), a British sitcom
- Trip, a comedy program on Quibi

===== Episodes =====
- "The Trip" (The Middle)
- "The Trip" (Prodigal Son)
- "The Trip" (Seinfeld)
- "The Trip" (Six Feet Under)
- "The Trip" (This Is Us)

=== Music ===
==== Bands ====
- The Trip (Australian-Canadian band), a pop/rock band formed in 2007
- The Trip (British-Italian band), a 1970s progressive rock band

==== Albums ====
- Trip (Cause and Effect album), 1994
- Trip (Jhené Aiko album) or the title song, 2017
- Trip (Rina Aiuchi album) or the title song, 2008
- Trip (Rivermaya album), 1996
- Trip, by Cro, 2021
- Trip, by Lambchop, 2020
- Trip, by Mike Singer, or the title song, 2019
- T.R.I.P. (album), by the Lights Out, or the title song, 2017
- The Trip (Art Pepper album) or the title song, 1976
- The Trip (Djam Karet album) or the title song, 2013
- The Trip (Lætitia Sadier album), 2010
- The Trip: Created by Snow Patrol, compiled by Gary Lightbody, 2004
- Trips (Samiam album), 2011
- Trips, by Long Distance Calling, 2016

==== Songs ====
- "Trip" (Ella Mai song), 2018
- "Trip" (Hedley song), 2005
- "Trip", by Brockhampton from Saturation, 2017
- "Trip", by Hammerbox from Numb, 1993
- "Trip", by Kendrick Lamar from Kendrick Lamar, 2009
- "Trip (Siopao na Special)", by Parokya ni Edgar from Khangkhungkherrnitz, 1996
- "The Trip" (Kim Fowley song), 1965
- "The Trip", by Donovan from Sunshine Superman, 1966

=== Musicals ===
- Captain Louie, originally The Trip, a stage musical by Stephen Schwartz, adapted from the Keats book

=== In print ===
- The Trip, a 1978 children's book by Ezra Jack Keats
- Trip (book), a 2018 nonfiction book by Tao Lin about his drug addiction
- Trip (magazine), a Brazilian lifestyle magazine

== Acronyms ==
- Transportation, Remuneration, Incentive Program, a West Virginia public transit program
- Traveler Redress Inquiry Program, a U.S. Department of Homeland Security program
- TRIP steel ("transformation induced plasticity"), a kind of steel
- TRIPS Agreement (Agreement on Trade-Related Aspects of Intellectual Property Rights), an international trade agreement

== Business ==
- Trip (drink), a Finnish brand of juice
- Trip.com, an online travel agency
- Trip.com Group, an online travel agency conglomerate
- TRIP Linhas Aéreas, a former Brazilian airline
- TripAdvisor (NASDAQ symbol: TRIP)

== People ==
=== Nickname ===
- Trip Adler (born 1984), American entrepreneur
- S. Ward Casscells (1952–2012), American cardiologist, World War II officer and Assistant Secretary of Defense for Health Affairs
- Trip Hawkins (born 1953), American entrepreneur
- Trip Kuehne (born 1972), American golfer
- Trip MacCracken (born 1974), American football manager
- Trip Payne (born 1968), American puzzle designer

=== Given name or stage name ===
- Trip Gabriel (born 1955), American journalist
- Trip Lee, stage name of American rapper William Lee Barefield III (born 1987)

=== Surname ===
- Boy Trip (1921–1990), Dutch politician
- Don Trip (born 1985), American rapper
- Rob Trip (born 1960), Dutch journalist and presenter

== Other uses ==
- Butler Blue III, or "Trip", the 2013–2020 bulldog mascot of Butler University, Indianapolis, Indiana, US
- Trip (search engine), for searching evidence-based medical literature
- Trip, a village in Bixad, Satu Mare, Romania
- Trips formation, an American football formation
- Trip, a psychedelic experience induced by drugs
- Trip, an instance of travel
- Trip, a falling accident

== See also ==
- Tripe (disambiguation)
- Tripp (disambiguation)
- Trippe (disambiguation)
- Trippin' (disambiguation)
- Tripping (disambiguation)
