= Trippe =

Trippe may refer to:

== People with the surname ==
- Gavin Trippe (born 1940), English motorcycle racing promoter, journalist, and publisher
- Leo Trippe (1891–1964), Canadian hardware merchant, farm implement dealer, and political figure
- Juan Trippe (1899–1981), American airline entrepreneur and founder of Pan American Airlines
- John Trippe (1785–1810), officer in the United States Navy during the Quasi-War with France and the First Barbary War
- Robert Pleasant Trippe (1819–1900), American politician, lawyer, and jurist

== Other ==
- USS Trippe, various United States Navy ships
- Trippe Holly Grove Cemetery, near McGhee, Arkansas, USA
- Trippe, Arkansas, city in Desha County, Arkansas with its own junction on Arkansas Highway 159

== See also ==
- Trip (disambiguation)
