= Tripp =

Tripp may refer to:

== People ==
- Tripp (surname)
- Tripp (nickname)
- Tripp Howell, drummer of the American country music band LANCO
- Tripp Vinson, American film producer
- Tripp Eisen, stage name of American musician and convicted sex offender Tod Rex Salvador (born 1965)

== Places ==
=== United States ===
- Tripp, South Dakota, a city
- Tripp, Sunnyvale, Texas, a former town
- Tripp, West Virginia, an unincorporated community
- Tripp, Wisconsin, a town
- Tripp County, South Dakota
- Tripp Lake, in Minnesota
- Tripp Hill, a mountain in New York
- Tripp Pinnacle, a summit in New York

=== Asia ===
- TRIPP or Trump Route for International Peace and Prosperity, a proposed route connecting Azerbaijan and its Nakhchivan region through Armenia

=== Antarctica ===
- Mount Tripp, Ross Dependency
- Tripp Bay, Victoria Land
  - Tripp Ice Tongue, which occupies the northern half of Tripp Bay
- Tripp Island, Victoria Land

== Arts and entertainment ==
- The Tripp, a Canadian rock band active from 1966 to 1977
- Danny Tripp, a main character in the television series Studio 60 on the Sunset Strip
- Frank Tripp, a character in the crime series CSI: Miami
- Robin Tripp, a main character in the British sitcom Man About the House, the film spin-off of the same title, and the spin-off sitcom Robin's Nest
- Tripp Dalton, a character in the American soap opera Days of Our Lives

== Buildings ==
- Tripp Family Homestead, a historic house in Scranton, Pennsylvania
- Tripp House and Store Complex at Durham, New York
- Tripp Memorial Library and Hall, Prairie du Sac, Wisconsin, United States, a building on the National Register of Historic Places

== Luggage ==
- Tripp (luggage), a UK luggage brand

== See also ==
- Trip (disambiguation)
- Tripp Trapp, an adjustable wooden high chair for children
- Trippville, Wisconsin, an unincorporated community
