= Name suffix =

Naming tradition

A name suffix, in the Western English-language naming tradition, follows a person's surname (last name) and provides additional information about the person. Post-nominal letters indicate that the individual holds a position, educational degree, accreditation, office, or honor (e.g. "PhD", "CCNA", "OBE"). Other examples include generational designations like "Sr." and "Jr."; "I", "II", "III", etc.; and "the Elder" and "the Younger".

== Post-nominal letters ==
=== Academic ===
Academic suffixes indicate the degree earned at a college or university. These include bachelor's degrees (AB, BA, BS, BE, BFA, BTech, LLB, BSc, etc.), master's degrees (MA, MS, MFA, LLM, MLA, MBA, MSc, MEng etc.), professional doctorates (JD, MD, DO, PharmD, DMin, etc.), and academic doctorates (PhD, EdD, DPhil, DBA, LLD, EngD, etc). Primarily in Europe (via a process known as habilitation), academic doctorates senior to that of a PhD are administered; successful graduates use the terminal suffix "habil." – from the Latin Doctor habilitatus – or variations thereof.

In the case of doctorates, normally either the prefix (e.g. "Dr" or "Atty") or the suffix (see examples above) is used, but not both. In the United States, the suffix is the preferred format (thus allowing differentiation between types of doctorate) in written documentation.

Degree	Type	Suffix
Bachelor's	Bachelor of Arts	A.B. or B.A.
	Bachelor of Education	B.Ed
	Bachelor of Fine Arts	B.F.A.
	Bachelor of Science	B.S., B.Sc. , or B.E.
	Bachelor of Technology	B.Tech. or B.T
	Bachelor of Laws	L.L.B. or J.D.
Master's	Master of Arts	M.A.
	Master of Business Administration	M.B.A.
	Master of Fine Arts	M.F.A.
	Master of Liberal Arts	M.L.A.
	Master of Science	M.S. or M.Sc.
	Master of Social Work	M.S.W.
	Master of Laws	M.L. or LL.M.

=== Honorary ===
Such titles may be given by:

- a monarch (for example, KBE, a suffix granted to Knights Commander of the Order of the British Empire);
- a university (as in a LLD (Doctor of Laws) given in recognition of a person's life achievements rather than their academic standing);
- a church or seminary, who may offer an honorary Doctor of Divinity (DD) to outstanding ministers or teachers.

==== Esquire ====
The style Esq. or Esquire was once used to distinguish a man who was an apprentice to a knight and is used for a man of socially high ranking. In the United States, Esq. is used as a professional styling for a licensed attorney. In the United Kingdom, it is largely obsolete but occasionally used by untitled males in social and business contexts.

=== Professional ===
Professional titles include Esq., often used for an attorney (but not necessarily) in the United States who has passed a state bar examination, and CSA (casting) and ASCAP, which indicate membership in professional societies. The suffix CA is used for individuals who have completed the requirements to become a Chartered Accountant. The suffix CPA is also used for individuals who have completed the requirements to become a Certified Public Accountant. Similarly, Chartered Financial Analysts use the suffix CFA. Sommeliers (restaurant wine professionals) who have passed the Master Sommelier exam use the MS suffix. Engineers that are certified as a Professional Engineer in his or her state will use the suffix PE (PEng in Canada), Certified Professional Geologists use PG, Certified Professional Logisticians use CPL, and Chartered Engineers use CEng. Likewise, Registered Architects sometimes use the suffix RA, or more often a suffix such as AIA or RIBA that refers to their professional society. Examination Office personnel within the United Kingdom who are registered with the Examination Officers' Association use MEOA. In the United States, professional archaeologists registered with the Register of Professional Archaeologists use the suffix RPA.

Project managers that have obtained certification as Project Management Professionals from the Project Management Institute may use the suffix PMP after their name. Similarly, individuals who hold certifications in the field of information security—e.g. CISA, CISSP, and/or CISM—may use them as suffixes.

The suffix PT is used by Physical Therapists to denote their state certification, but not to be confused with DPT (Doctor of Physical Therapy) which is a qualifying degree. British physiotherapists prefer to use MCSP or SRP to denote membership to professional bodies. RN is used by qualified nurses as a suffix.

Officers and enlisted in the United States Military will add an abbreviation of the service frequently to disambiguate seniority, and reserve status. For example, Captain Smith, USN (O-6), outranks Captain Jones, USMC (O-3).

Red Seal certified trades people in Canada can use the Red Seal Endorsement (RSE) acronym.

=== Religious orders ===
Members of religious institutes commonly use their institute's initials as a suffix. For example, a Franciscan friar uses the post-nominal initials OFM, derived from the order's name in Latin, Ordo Fratrum Minorum (Order of Friars Minor). Equally, a Viatorian priest uses the suffix "CSV" from the name of his religious institute, Clerici Santi Viatori (Clerics of Saint Viator). These initials are not considered by members of religious institutes as an equivalent to academic or honorary post-nominial initials, but rather as a sign of membership in a particular religious lineage.

=== Ordering ===
In some English-speaking countries, the arrangement of post-nominal letters is governed by rules of precedence, and this list is sometimes called the "Order of Wear" (for the wearing of medals).

== Generational titles ==
Generational suffixes are used to distinguish persons who share the same legal name within a family. A generational suffix can be used informally (for disambiguation purposes or as nicknames) and is often incorporated in legal documents.

=== United States and continental Europe ===
In the United States the most common name suffixes are senior and junior, which are abbreviated as Sr. and Jr. with initial capital letters, with or without preceding commas. In Britain these are rarer, but when they are used the abbreviations are Snr and Jnr, respectively. The use of these social terms is governed by etiquette but not enshrined in law. According to The Emily Post Institute, an authority on etiquette, the term Jr. can be correctly used only if a male child's first, middle, and last names are identical to his father's (current) names. When a male child has the same name as his grandfather, uncle or male cousin, but not his father, he can use the II suffix, which is pronounced "the second". In rare cases, the II suffix may be used for a son, e.g. former American president Barack Hussein Obama II and his father, Barack Hussein Obama Sr. (The example of Obama Sr., born Baraka Obama, also shows that suffixes are based on the father's current legal name and not necessarily their birth name.) I and II may occasionally be used for a father and son, as was the case with Johann Baptist Strauss I and his son, Johann Baptist Strauss II; despite having a different middle name, the former's grandson (and latter's nephew) came to be known as Johann Strauss III. (Informally, each numeral suffix could have been shifted down by one place, based on their shared ancestor – Johann I's grandfather – who was named Johann Michael Strauss.)

An alternative to the usage of Sr. and Jr. (or I and II), primarily used in reference to non-Anglophone historical subjects, is the pairing of the Elder and the Younger. These alternate name suffixes, which do not have any standard English abbreviation, are evident in many cases including that of Johann Baptist von Lampi the Elder and his son, Johann Baptist von Lampi the Younger. A similar case is that of the historical figure Pliny the Elder and his nephew (whom he posthumously adopted as a son), Pliny the Younger.

When name suffixes are spelled out in full, they are not capitalized. Social name suffixes are far more frequently applied to men than to women. A child with a name that varies from a parent's name in middle name only may also be informally known as Jr. (e.g. Francis Wayne Sinatra, son of Francis Albert Sinatra), and his father may be known informally as Sr. (e.g., Paul John Teutul and his son, Paul Michael Teutul). Roman numeral suffixes can be used to name a child after another family member like an uncle, cousin, or ancestor (including grandfather or great-grandfather). For example, Quentin Roosevelt II was named for his late uncle, Quentin Roosevelt. Similarly, a grandson of Henry Ford was named Henry Ford II (the name again skipped a generation with the birth of Henry II's grandson, Henry Ford III).

Historically, when child mortality was high, a child could be named for its deceased sibling (a necronym), with or without a suffix (such was the case of Salvador Dalí). There is at least one known case of multiple siblings having the same name in modern times—that of George Foreman's five sons, including eldest George Jr. and youngest George VI.

The suffix III is used after either Jr. or II and, like subsequent numeric suffixes, does not need to be restricted to one family line. For example, if Randall and Patrick Dudley are brothers and if Randall has a son before Patrick, he may call his son Patrick II. If Patrick now has a son, his son is Patrick Jr. (or Patrick III; alternatively, Patrick II if Randall did not have a son named Patrick II). As time passes, the III suffix goes to the son of either Patrick Jr. or Patrick II, whoever is first to have a son named Patrick. This is one way it is possible and correct for a Junior to father a IV. Another example involves President Ulysses S. Grant and his sons Frederick, Ulysses Jr., and Jesse. When Frederick's son Ulysses was born in 1881, Ulysses Jr. did not yet have a son named after himself. Therefore, Frederick's son was Ulysses III. Ulysses Jr.'s son, born afterwards in 1893, was Ulysses IV. Jesse's son Chapman was the father of Ulysses V, as neither Ulysses III nor Ulysses IV had sons named for themselves.

There is no hard-and-fast rule over what happens to suffixes when the most senior of the name dies. Etiquette expert and humorist Judith Martin, for example, believes they should all move up (as Sr. and subsequent suffixes can be redistributed), but most agree that this is up to the individual families.

There are instances of daughters being named after their mothers and also using the suffix Jr. (such as Anna Eleanor Roosevelt Jr., Winifred Sackville Stoner Jr., and Carolina Herrera Jr.), or after their grandmothers or aunts with the suffix II; noting both scenarios are rare. Usually, the namesake is given a different middle name and so would not need a suffix for differentiation. Furthermore, once the woman marries, she would most commonly take the surname of her husband and thus do away with the generational suffix. The title Jr. is sometimes used in legal documents, particularly those pertaining to wills and estates, to distinguish among female family members of the same name.

A wife who uses the title Mrs. often would also use her husband's full name, including the suffix. In less formal situations, the suffix may be omitted: Mrs. Lon Chaney Jr. on a wedding invitation but Mrs. L. Chaney or simply Shannon Chaney for a friendly note. Widows are conventionally entitled to retain their late husband's full names and suffixes, but divorcées do not continue to style themselves with a former husband's full name and suffix even if they retain the surname.

Juniors sometimes go by their first initials and "J" for Jr. regardless of middle initial. Examples include former American football players Terrell Ray Ward Jr. (who goes by T. J. Ward) and Erick R. Manuel Jr., who is better known as EJ Manuel.

Former Major League Baseball player B. J. Upton, whose real name is Melvin Emanuel Upton Jr., is called B. J. due to his father's nickname being "Bossman"; B. J. stands for "Bossman Junior".

Common nicknames for a junior or II include "Chip" (as in "chip off the old block"); e.g., President James Earl Carter Jr.'s second son James Earl Carter III goes by "Chip". Another is "Bud" (predominantly in the American South); e.g., Marlon Brando Jr.'s childhood nickname was "Bud". Another alternative is "Skip"; e.g., Harry "Skip" Caray Jr. and Harry Christopher "Chip" Caray III, or "Skip" may imply that the name skips a generation. Common nicknames for a III are "Trip(p)", "Trace", and "Trey" which denote that the name carrier is the third person to carry the name. Notable examples include Green Day drummer Tré Cool (Frank Edwin Wright III), South Park co-creator Trey Parker (Randolph Severn Parker III), and Trey Smith (Willard Carroll Smith III), elder son of actor Will Smith (Willard Carroll Smith II).

=== United Kingdom ===
In the United Kingdom, the suffixes "Snr" and "Jnr" are rare, and not usually considered part of a person's name as such. Ordinal suffixes such as "III" are generally reserved for monarchs; however, the General Register Office has stated that, whereas it would normally reject a string of symbols or letters that "has no intrinsic sense of being a name" when registering a child, a suffix such as "III" would be accepted. Those who inherit a title of nobility do not use ordinal suffixes, but are distinguished from any ancestors with the same name by their position in the order of succession; for example Arthur Wellesley, 2nd Duke of Wellington, is thus distinguished from his father, Arthur Wellesley, 1st Duke of Wellington.

=== Other European countries ===
In French, the designations for a father and son with the same name are père (father) and fils (son), an example being Alexandre Dumas père and Alexandre Dumas fils. Le jeune (the young) may be used to distinguish between brothers.

In Portuguese, common designations are Júnior (junior), Filho (son), Neto (grandson), Bisneto (great-grandson), and Sobrinho (nephew).

In Dutch, "sr." and "jr." are used socially rather than legally, but the system is not extended to "III" and beyond. Instead, Piet de Vries jr. will become Piet de Vries sr. upon the death of his father if there is a grandson also named Piet to take on the junior title. Otherwise the suffix falls away.

In Swedish, den äldre (the elder) and den yngre (the younger), abbreviated d.ä. and d.y. respectively, are sometimes used to distinguish two people with the same name, often but not necessarily, father and son. An example is Gösta Ekman d.ä., actor and grandfather of actor Gösta Ekman d.y., cf. Pliny the Elder and Pliny the Younger which in Swedish are Plinius den äldre and Plinius den yngre.

In Irish, óg (young), sometimes anglicised as "oge", may be used to distinguish two related people who might otherwise have the same name. The suffix ach is used to mean 'of or relating to' a noun or an adjective e.g. Caomhánach or Laighneach.

== See also ==
- List of family name affixes (surname suffixes and prefixes)
- List of post-nominal letters
- Post-nominal letters
