= USS Trippe =

USS Trippe may refer to the following ships of the United States Navy:

- USS Trippe (1812), purchased in 1812, served in the War of 1812 and was burned by the British
- USS Trippe (DD-33), a Paulding-class destroyer launched in 1910 and served in World War I; and the United States Coast Guard from 1924 to 1930
- USS Trippe (DD-403), a Benham-class destroyer launched in 1938, served in World War II and was sunk as a result of her participation in Operation Crossroads
- USS Trippe (FF-1075), a Knox-class frigate launched in 1969 and decommissioned in 1991

== See also ==
- Trippe (disambiguation)
