= USS Platte (AO-186) =

Oiler of the United States Navy

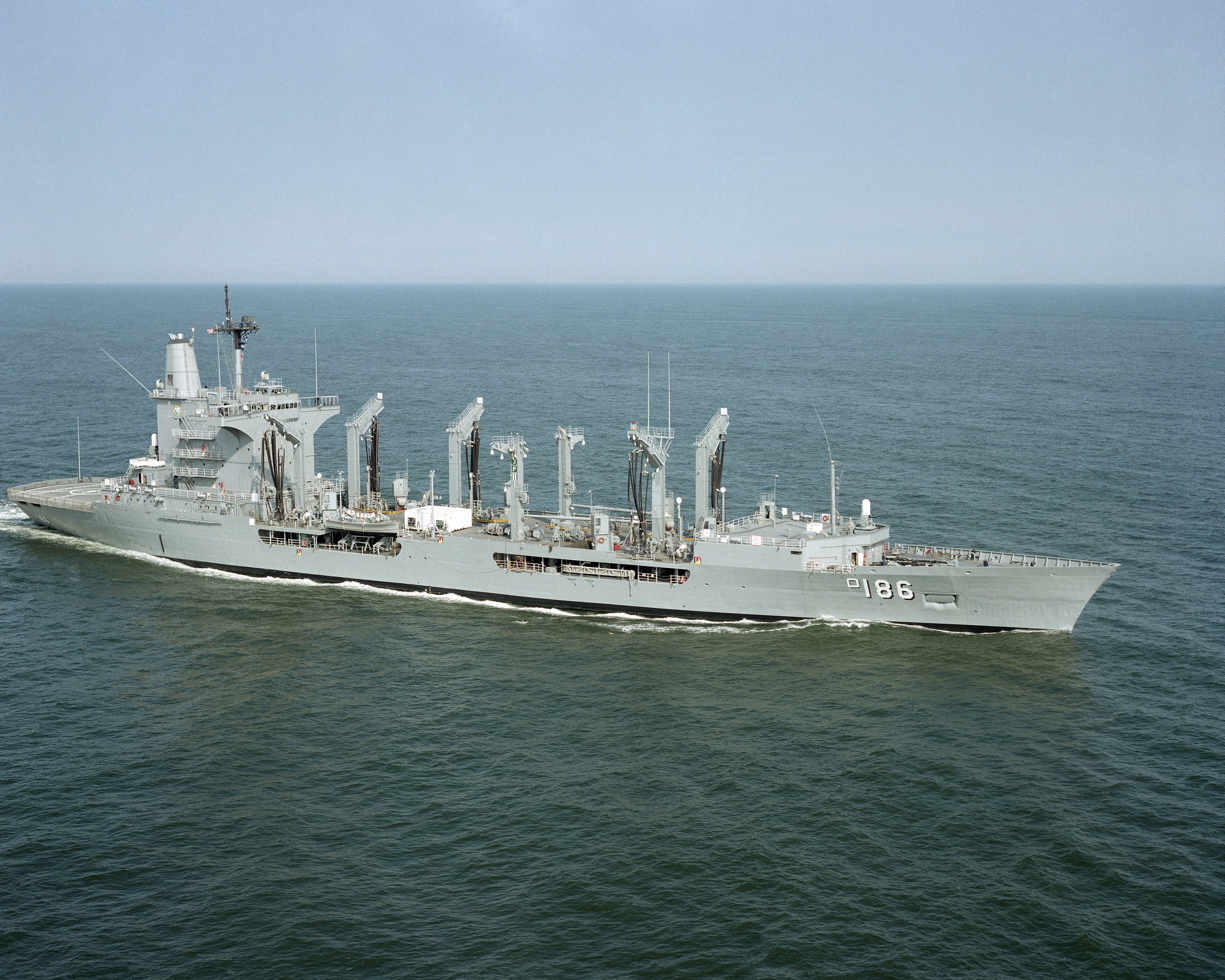
- USS Platte before the jumboization, 1984

History

United States
- Name: USS Platte (AO-186)
- Namesake: Platte River
- Awarded: 11 April 1978
- Builder: Avondale Shipyards
- Laid down: 2 February 1981
- Launched: 30 January 1982
- Acquired: 27 January 1983
- Commissioned: 29 January 1983
- Decommissioned: 30 June 1999
- Stricken: 30 June 1999
- Identification: IMO number: 7816575
- Motto: Excellence Through Quality
- Honors and awards: Joint Meritorious Unit Award, Meritorious Unit Commendation, Navy Battle "E" Ribbon (3), National Defense Service Medal, Southwest Asia Service Medal, Armed Forces Service Medal, Coast Guard Meritorious Unit Commendation, Coast Guard SOS Ribbon, Kuwait Liberation Medal (Kuwait)
- Fate: Scrapped December 2014
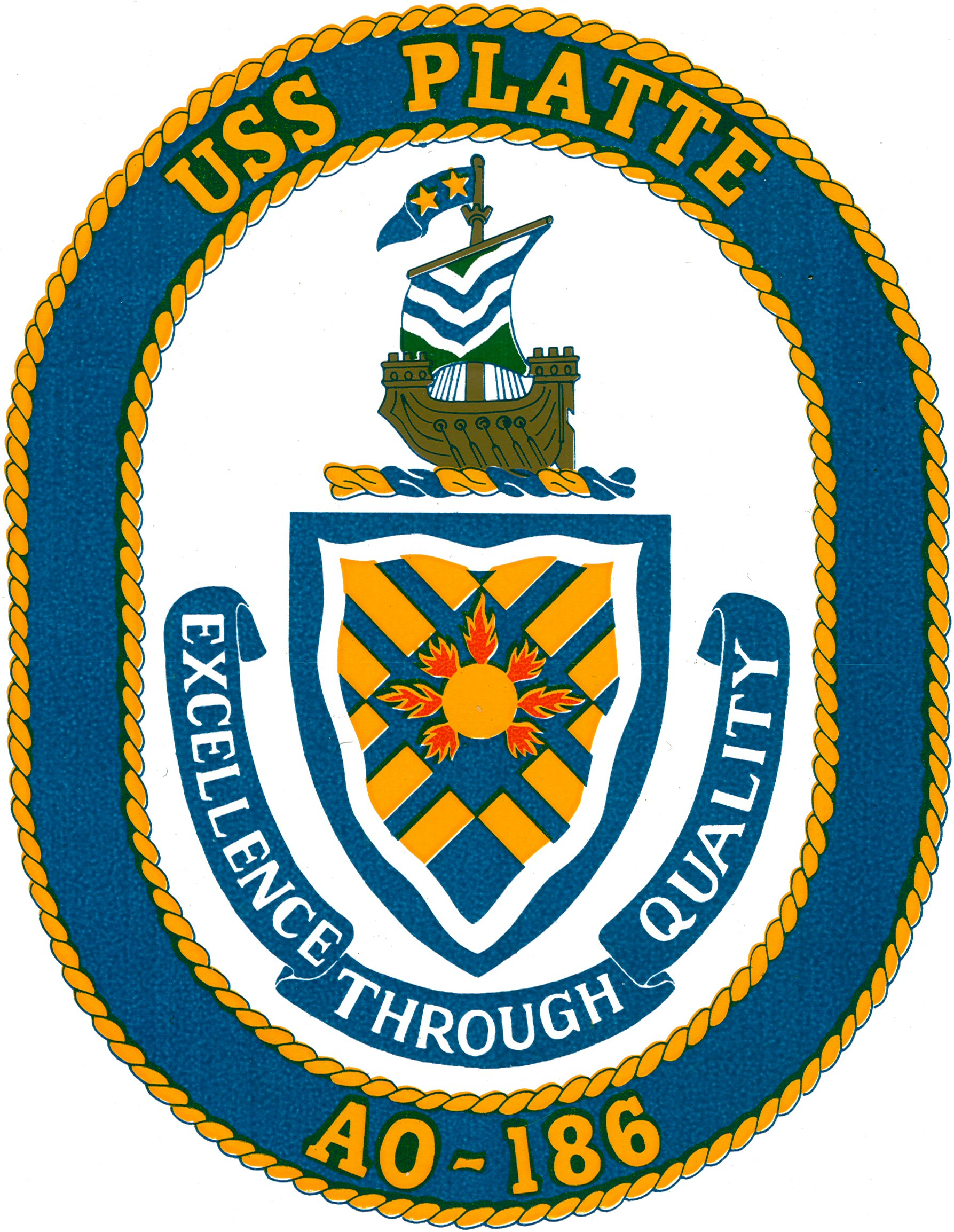
- Badge

General characteristics
- Class & type: Cimarron Class Fleet Oiler
- Displacement: 36,814 tons full load after modification
- Length: 598 ft 6 in (182.42 m) as built, 708 ft 6 in (215.95 m) after modification
- Beam: 88 ft (27 m)
- Draft: 32 ft (9.8 m) max
- Propulsion: two boilers, one steam turbine, single shaft, 24,000 shp
- Speed: 20 knots
- Complement: 135 (12 officers) plus 90 spare berths after modification
- Armament: 2 x 20mm Vulcan Phalanx Mk 15 (CIWS)
- Aircraft carried: Helicopter platform only
- Notes: These ships were sized to provide two complete refuelings of a fossil-fueled aircraft carrier and six to either accompanying destroyers. All five of the class were jumboized, increasing their capacities from 120,000 bbls to 180,000 bbls and improving underway replenishment capabilities. Platte was in New Orleans from February 1992-December 1992 for jumboization.

USS Platte (AO-186) was the fifth and last of the Cimarron-class ships built to carry cargo and bulk fuel to battle groups. She was homeported in Norfolk, Virginia and carried a crew of 180 -230 sailors as standard during her years of service.

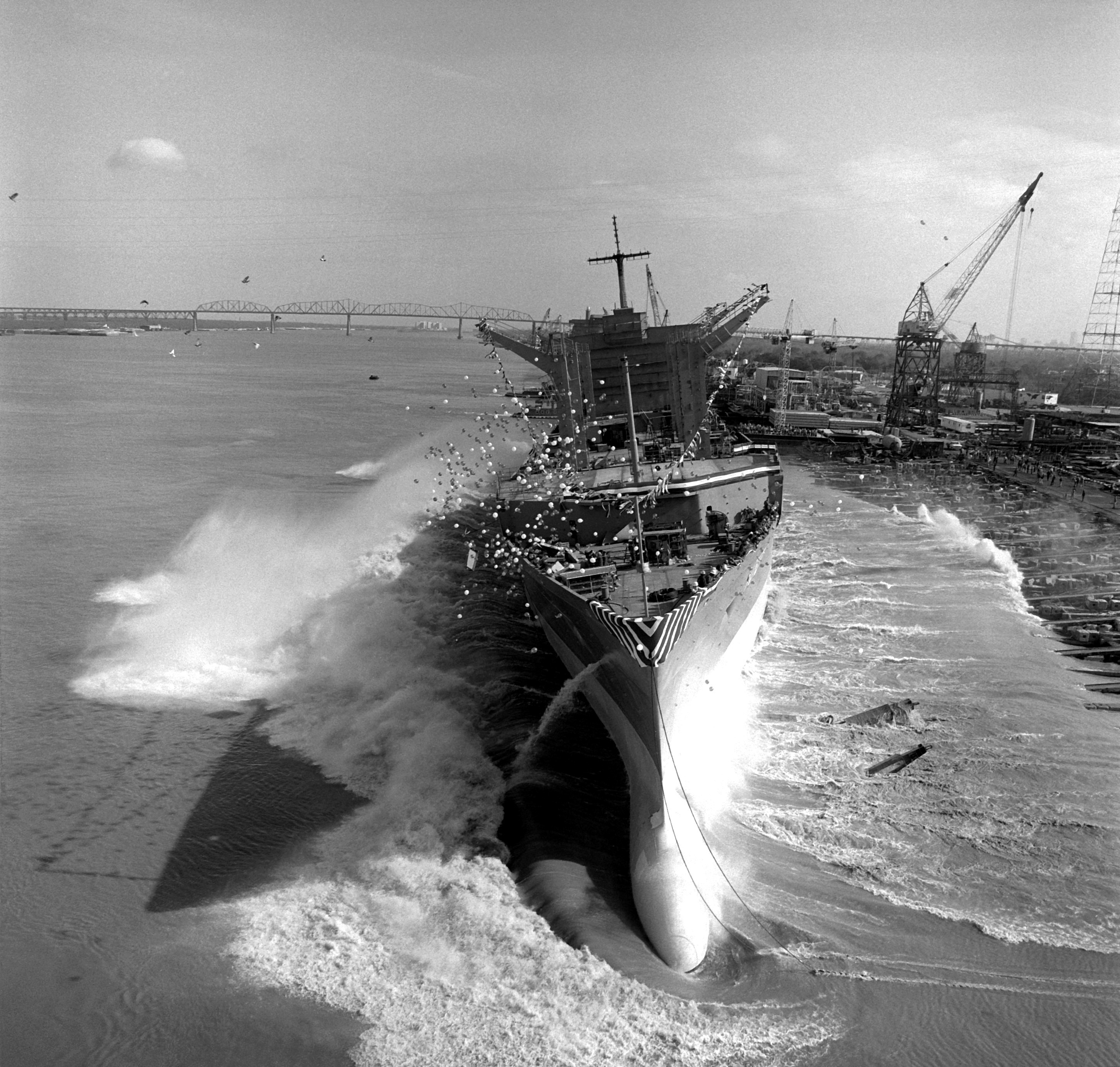
USS Platte launched at New Orleans on 30 January 1982.

Platte derived her name from the Platte River. Her contract was awarded 11 April 1978 and she was built at Avondale Shipyard in New Orleans. Her keel was laid 2 February 1981, and launched 30 January 1982. Platte was commissioned on 16 April 1983.

Her most notable historical event was the collision with the USS Trippe approximately 500 miles east of Jacksonville, Florida on 19 April 1989. This event was reported in the media, however it was overshadowed by a major naval disaster that occurred the same day. That was the day the USS Iowa (BB-61) turret 2 exploded killing 47 sailors off the coast of Puerto Rico.

Between May 1989 – May 1994 she transited the Panama Canal four times (three times west to east and once east to west.)

She departed Norfolk, Virginia 28 December 1990 en route to Desert Shield support. Before she made the turn into the Straits of Hormuz, the shield became a storm and she fueled ships as the "Fifth and Finest Fleet Oiler" before becoming the "Preferred Oiler of the Persian Gulf.". She returned to Norfolk 28 June 1991 from Desert Storm.

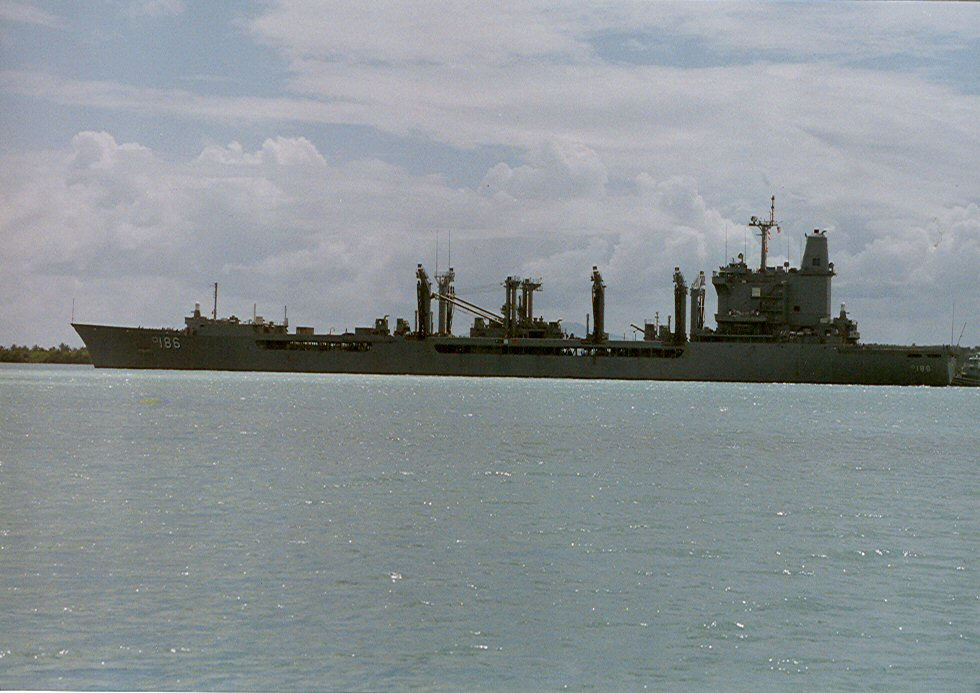
USS Platte off Puerto Rico after her jumboization, 1994.

In February 1992 she departed Norfolk, Virginia and returned to Avondale Shipyard. Between February and December Platte was "jumboized", meaning that, after cutting the ship into two sections, a 35.7 m long section was added to increase the fuel load. The new "mid-body" section included an ammunition elevator, a second Fairbanks Morse emergency diesel generator, additional a/c capabilities as well as several cargo holds. She departed Avondale Shipyard December 1992 being the last of the five ships to undergo this process and completing it in 10 months.

At commissioning she was 88 feet wide at her beam, 216 m (700 ft) long, displaced approx 37,000 tons at a speed of 19 knots. Propulsion was two 600 psi (4,100 kPa) steam boilers (automated steam) to one propeller. Her draft was 32 feet.

In 1991 she circumnavigated South America escorting the aircraft carrier Kitty Hawk to its west coast home port after leaving the shipyards in Norfolk, Va.

In September of 1994, the Platte embarked on a six month tour to the Mediterranean, making stops in Scotland, Spain, Italy, Sicily, Romania, Turkey, Greece and Israel.

She was decommissioned 30 June 1999 and placed in the James River Reserve Fleet (Ghost Fleet) near Fort Eustis, Virginia. Platte was slated for disposal at the earliest opportunity as of 7 August 2008.

She was scrapped by Southern Recycling at Brownsville in December 2014.

== Awards ==
- Joint Meritorious Unit Commendation
- Navy Meritorious Unit Commendation - x2
- Navy E Ribbon - x3
- Southwest Asia Service Medal
- Armed Forces Service Medal x2
- Coast Guard Meritorious Unit Commendation
- Coast Guard Special Operations Service Ribbon
- Kuwait Liberation Medal (Kuwait)
