= USS Trippe (DD-403) =

Benham-class destroyer

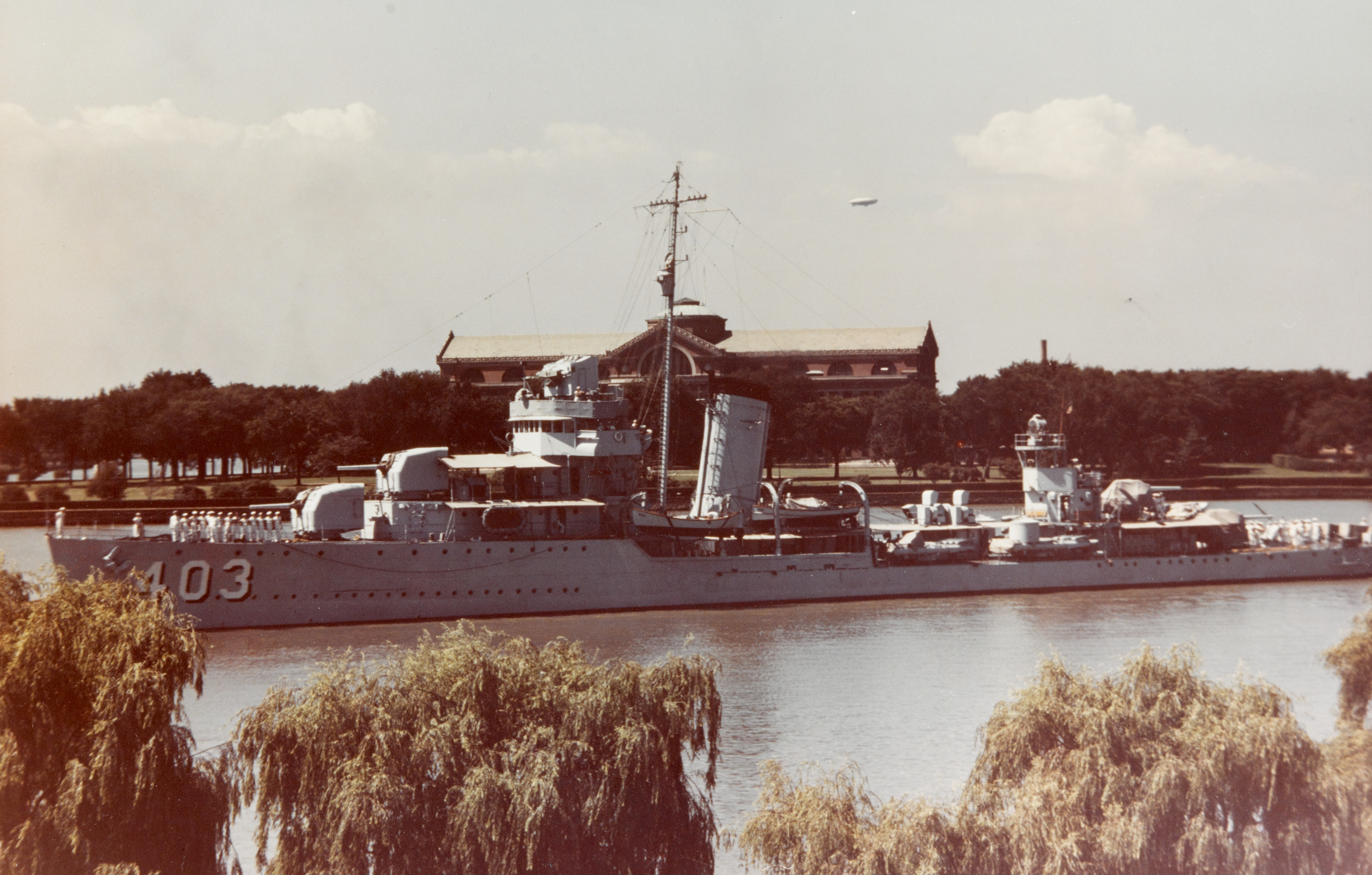
- USS Trippe (DD-403)

History

United States
- Namesake: John Trippe
- Builder: Boston Navy Yard
- Laid down: 15 April 1937
- Launched: 14 May 1938
- Commissioned: 1 November 1939
- Decommissioned: 28 August 1946
- Stricken: 19 February 1948
- Fate: Sunk as target 3 February 1948

General characteristics
- Class & type: Benham-class destroyer
- Displacement: 1,850 tons
- Length: 341 ft 1 in
- Beam: 35 ft 5 in
- Draft: 9 ft 10 in
- Speed: 38.5 knots
- Complement: 230 officers and enlisted
- Armament: 4 × 5 in (130 mm)/38 guns, 4 .50 cal (12.7 mm) guns. ma.16 21"

The third USS Trippe (DD-403) was a Benham-class destroyer in the United States Navy. She was named for John Trippe.

== Operational history ==
Trippe was laid down on 15 April 1937 by the Boston Navy Yard, launched on 14 May 1938; sponsored by Miss Betty S. Trippe and placed in commission on 1 November 1939.

Trippe spent the remainder of 1939 outfitting at Boston. In January 1940, she visited Newport, Rhode Island, to take on torpedoes and Yorktown, Virginia, to load depth charges before heading for the Gulf of Mexico. Following shakedown training in the Gulf of Mexico and the Caribbean, she returned to Boston on 20 March 1940. After completing her post-shakedown overhaul, Trippe departed Boston on 24 June ultimately to join the Caribbean portion of the Neutrality Patrol. She voyaged via Hampton Roads to San Juan, Puerto Rico, where she arrived early in July only to return north at mid-month for a two-day visit to Washington, D.C. On 26 July, Trippe entered San Juan once more to begin Neutrality Patrol duty in earnest.

For eight months, the destroyer roamed the warm waters of the West Indies to prevent the European belligerents from waging war in the Western Hemisphere. During that period, she escorted Tuscaloosa, with President Franklin Roosevelt embarked, upon a tour of bases in the Caribbean. She saw the President safely into Charleston, South Carolina, on 14 December and then headed for Philadelphia and quick repairs. After a two-day visit to Norfolk at the end of the first week in January 1941, Trippe steamed south to Guantánamo Bay, Cuba, where she conducted neutrality patrols until spring.

=== North Atlantic duty ===
On 21 March, the warship began a two-month overhaul at Boston. On 24 April, while Trippe continued repairs, President Roosevelt extended the Neutrality Patrol to the very edge of the German war zone. When Trippe emerged from her refit in May, she visited Norfolk and then trained out of Newport until early June. On 11 June, she joined the screen of USS Texas for her first extended patrol in the North Atlantic. On 29 June, Texas and her escorts passed through the periscope sights of a U-boat. The puzzled German captain almost perpetrated an incident by attacking; but, unable to match Task Force 1's speed, he gave up the chase late that afternoon. Blissfully unaware of the danger, the battleship steamed on with Trippe and her sister destroyers. The following day, they ended their patrol at Newport.

Trippe continued patrolling out of Newport, first with Texas and then with New York, through July and the first fortnight in August. On 15 August, the warship shifted her base to Boston and Provincetown. On 25 April, she cleared Boston to escort Mississippi to NS Argentia, Newfoundland. After more than a month of training and antisubmarine operations off Newfoundland, Trippe departed Argentia on 11 October in company with Yorktown, New Mexico, Quincy, Savannah, and seven other destroyers. After anchoring briefly at Casco Bay, Maine and patrolling the area between that port and Boston the warships headed for a mid-ocean rendezvous to relieve the Royal Navy escort of a westbound convoy. On her return voyage, Trippe parted company with the escort off Portland, Maine, and put into Casco Bay. On 9 November, she departed the Maine coast in the screen of Ranger, Vincennes, and Quincy to meet another westbound convoy and escort it to the United States.

=== World War II ===
In mid-November, Trippe escorted Ranger south to the West Indies and screened flight operations conducted from that carrier in the vicinity of Trinidad until early December. She was returning north with the carrier on 7 December when the Japanese attack on Pearl Harbor jolted the United States into World War II. America's entry into the war, however, did not change Trippe's assignment. She continued to escort transatlantic convoys and to hunt U-boats. She stopped at Norfolk for a week and then headed for Newport on 10 December. Just before dawn on 16 December, an Army bomber approached her from the north and after making several passes dropped a stick of bombs and reported sinking a German destroyer in Block Island Sound. Trippe emerged unscathed the bombs exploded some 200 yards off her bow and continued on to Newport where she arrived that same day.

Over the next 10 months, Trippe was all over the northwestern Atlantic. She escorted coastwise traffic between ports along the eastern seaboard. She relieved British warships in mid-ocean and escorted their convoys into American ports as well as screening eastbound convoys as far as mid-ocean where British warships took over. The destroyer patrolled off such diverse places as Argentia, Newfoundland and the North Carolina capes. Her escort duties took her as far south as the Panama Canal and the West Indies, as far north as Newfoundland, and on one occasion, as far east as Londonderry Port in Northern Ireland. Twice, Trippe searched for survivors of torpedoed merchantmen once off Hampton Roads early in February and again near Bermuda in June. She also made two fruitless attacks on what she believed to be submerged U-boats. Now and then, she even found time to conduct drills and gunnery training.

In October 1942, Trippe cleared the Chesapeake Bay area and steamed north to Newport where she arrived on the 7th. For the next two weeks, she operated with Massachusetts while the new battleship practiced shore bombardment for the upcoming invasion of French North Africa. During the pre-dawn hours of 19 October, she was steaming for Casco Bay when Benson struck Trippe on her starboard quarter, killing four Trippe crewmen and injuring three others. On 13 November, Trippe completed repairs at New York and got underway for antisubmarine warfare training at New London, Connecticut.

Following almost a month of training and escorting coastal convoys, Trippe departed New York in the screen of her first convoy bound for Casablanca. She returned to New York on 7 February 1943 and conducted more training. In April, the destroyer made another round-trip voyage to Morocco and escorted a coastal convoy to Norfolk before heading for the Mediterranean. On 10 May, the warship arrived at Oran, Algeria. She then screened convoys between that port and Bizerte, conducted patrols, and practiced shore bombardment in preparation to support the Allied landings on Sicily.

On 9 July, the destroyer left Oran in the screen of a Sicily-bound convoy and was still at sea when Allied troops clambered ashore the following day. She arrived off Gela on the 14th, the day following the landings at that port, and patrolled that area until the 20th when she returned to Oran. However, the destroyer arrived back at Sicily the same day this time at Palermo. Three days later, the Luftwaffe attacked the anchorage. To elude radar, the German medium bombers approached from the south, low over the Sicilian mountains, and circled the targets. As Trippe zigzagged to evade bombing and strafing planes, her 5-inch battery barked defiantly. When the raid was over, she claimed credit for one of the German eagles

Up north, while Lieutenant General George S. Patton's armored columns moved across the northern coast of Sicily and sidestepped heavy enemy formations with amphibious landings, the Navy supported his advance. Trippe left Palermo on 4 August in company with Savannah to support the advance with naval gunfire. On the 5th, she bombarded bridges at Terranova. During the next two days, the destroyer joined Philadelphia before supporting the landings at Sant Agato di Militello. Trippe's guns paved the way for the troops landing at Brolo on the 11th, and, on the 16th, her main battery supported the amphibious end-run at Spadafora. The following day, Sicily was declared secured, and Trippe headed north with three PT boats to accept the surrender of the Aeolian Islands of Lipari and Stromboli.

The Italian mainland was the destroyer's next target. In the early hours of 20 August, Trippe and Wainwright shelled a railroad bridge at Fiume Petrace, then turned south to Bizerte and escorted a convoy to Palermo. Trippe next returned to Bizerte and, on 31 August, proceeded to Oran.

British troops landed at Reggio, Italy, on 3 September to begin the long, bitter drive up the Italian peninsula. Two days later, Trippe put to sea to escort a convoy to the assault beaches at Salerno, just south of Naples. This attack, aimed at turning German defenses in the south of Italy, was launched on the morning of 9 September 1943. The troops ran into heavy enemy resistance. The Luftwaffe and heavy coastal batteries took a heavy toll of the landing force, but Trippe and other fire support ships brought their batteries to bear and helped the troops ashore consolidate their beachhead.

After several round-trip voyages between Salerno and Oran, she returned to the Bay of Naples on 10 October. Early on the morning of the 13th, while Trippe was escorting a convoy from Naples to Oran, the German submarine U-371 attacked the convoy and quickly sank Bristol. Trippe searched briefly for the attacker, but concentrated upon rescuing Bristol's survivors, so the U-boat escaped.

Trippe occupied the next month with convoy operations in the western Mediterranean and patrol work off Oran. On 18 November, she sailed from Gibraltar with Brooklyn and a screen of British and United States destroyers. Off Casablanca, they rendezvoused with battleship Iowa, which had just borne President Roosevelt on the first leg of his journey to the Allied conferences at Cairo and Tehran. Trippe escorted Iowa through the Straits of Gibraltar to Oran then screened the battleship as she steamed westward again through the Straits into the Atlantic and proceeded to Casablanca to await President Roosevelt's return. After shepherding her charge to that port, Trippe turned back to Algiers and resumed her patrol operations.

On the afternoon of 16 December, the destroyer put to sea in company with Edison and Woolsey to hunt for the survivors of a torpedoed merchantman. While searching for castaways, the three warships also sought the U-boat itself. Early that evening, they made radar contact on U-73 steaming on the surface. Woolsey switched on her searchlights, and Trippe's fire control radar locked onto the target. The two destroyers immediately opened up with their main batteries and pumped salvo after salvo of 5-inch shells into the German submarine. Six minutes after visual contact, U-73 went down for the last time all the way to the bottom. While Woolsey picked up the German submariners, Trippe made sure that U-73 had no colleagues lurking in the area. The destroyers then returned to Oran.

At the beginning of 1944, the destroyer was at Palermo, Sicily. On 21 January, she got underway to support the Allied landings at Anzio, located farther up the Italian peninsula near Rome. The next day, she took station with Brooklyn and Edison, and her guns supported the troops going ashore. Two days later, she fought off a Luftwaffe air attack. She returned to gunfire support on the 25th and bombarded enemy troops and vehicles. On 31 January, she pounded troop concentrations and vehicles and demolished an observation post. Trippe hit two German strong points on 5 February. She was relieved of duty on the gunline on 10 February and returned to Oran, rescuing two downed British flyers along the way.

On 23 February, Trippe steamed to Casablanca, where she joined a hunter-killer group built around Card and got underway for the United States. During the voyage, the escort carrier and the five destroyers in her screen conducted air, sound, and radar searches for German submarines. Trippe parted company with the task unit on 4 March and, after a stop at Bermuda, put into New York for a month of upkeep. Following refresher training, she conducted hunterkiller operations out of Casco Bay. Late in May, she escorted Hancock on the first leg of the new carrier's shakedown cruise before joining Cooper for electronics countermeasure experiments in Chesapeake Bay. She put into Norfolk on 3 June, but departed the next day with Ticonderoga for air operations off the Virginia capes. From 19 June until Independence Day 1944, Trippe conducted exercises in the Gulf of Paria near Trinidad. On 9 July, she returned to Boston with Hancock and began a 19-day availability. Between 28 July and 23 October, the destroyer made two round-trip voyages between the United States and southern Italy escorting convoys to and from that bitterly contested campaign. For the remainder of the year, she conducted training near Casco Bay and screened Shangri La during air operations near Trinidad. Late in February 1945, Trippe escorted another convoy to the Mediterranean, this time to Oran. She returned to New York during the first week in April and began a brief yard period.

Repairs complete, Trippe headed south with a convoy bound for the Canal Zone. She transited the canal, stopped at San Diego, and arrived in Pearl Harbor on 16 May. She spent several weeks in the Hawaiian Islands conducting shore bombardment drills in preparation for duty with the 5th Fleet in the Central Pacific. However, the landings for which she prepared never came to fruition. Instead, the ship headed west in mid June and escorted convoys between various islands in the Central Pacific, including Iwo Jima, Saipan, Ulithi, and Okinawa. The brevity of her stopovers protected her from the wrath of the kamikazes. She was en route to Okinawa with a convoy on 15 August, when she received word of the cessation of hostilities.

=== Post war ===
Trippe remained in the Far East participating in the surrender negotiations with Japanese garrisons remaining in the Marianas and Bonin Islands. On 5 November, she returned to Saipan and began a month of patrols, training, and air-sea rescue operations north of that island. On 16 December, she cleared Guam to return to the United States.

Her homecoming was brief, however, for on 16 January 1946, she steamed back to Pearl Harbor to prepare for Operation Crossroads, the atomic bomb tests conducted at Bikini Atoll. Four months later, the tests were ready to go forward. Trippe entered Bikini lagoon on 1 June. The destroyer missed the first explosion, an air-burst on 1 July; but the second test, an underwater detonation on the 26th, made her so radioactive that it was unsafe to approach her. Trippe's radioactive contamination forced the Navy to keep her at Bikini, where she was subjected to an intensive study. Trippe was decommissioned there on 28 August 1946. Over the next 18 months, her hull deteriorated to the point of making it almost impossible to keep her afloat. On 3 February 1948, she was towed to deep water off Kwajalein and sunk by gunfire. Her name was struck from the Navy List on 19 February 1948.

== Honors ==
Trippe earned six battle stars for World War II service.
