= Trippin' =

Trippin' or Trippin may refer to:

== Film and television ==
- Trippin' (film), a 1999 American comedy
- Trippin' (American TV series), a 2005 environmental documentary series
- Trippin (Malaysian TV series), a 2006–2007 infotainment programme

== Songs ==
- "Trippin" (Conro song), 2018
- "Trippin'" (Oris Jay song), 2001; covered by Cahill as "Trippin' on You", 2008
- "Trippin'" (Push Push song), 1991
- "Trippin'" (Total song), 1998
- "Trippin' (That's the Way Love Works)", by Toni Braxton, 2005
- "Trippin'", by Buddy from Harlan & Alondra, 2018
- "Trippin", by French Montana from Jungle Rules, 2017
- "Trippin'", by Godsmack from Awake, 2000
- "Trippin'", by Luciano, 2020
- "Trippin'", by Zion I from Mind over Matter, 2000

== See also ==
- Tripping (disambiguation)
- Trip (disambiguation)
