= Tripping =

Tripping may refer to:

- Psychedelic experience
- Tripping (ice hockey), a penalty infraction
- Tripping (pipe), the act of running or pulling drill pipe into or out of a wellbore on a drilling rig
- Tripping, an action of a protection device in an electrical grid
- "Tripping" (song), a 2005 single by Robbie Williams
- tripping.com, a metasearch engine for vacation homes
- Falling (accident), when it is due to unwanted interactions with other objects

== See also ==
- Trippin' (disambiguation)
- Trip (disambiguation)
