= USS Trippe (FF-1075) =

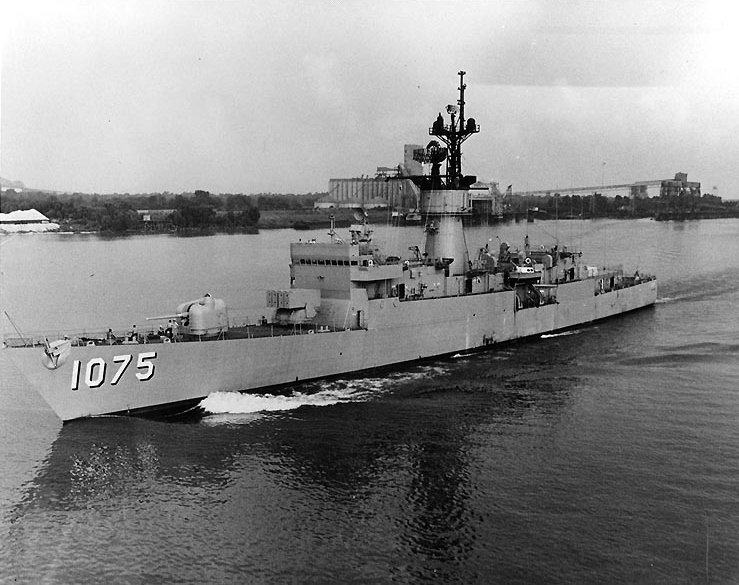
- USS Trippe (FF-1075) underway off New Orleans, Louisiana

History

United States
- Name: USS Trippe (DE-1075)
- Namesake: John Trippe
- Ordered: 22 July 1964
- Builder: Avondale Shipyard, Westwego, Louisiana
- Yard number: 1075
- Laid down: 29 July 1968
- Launched: 1 November 1969
- Sponsored by: Mrs. John S. Foster
- Acquired: 11 September 1970
- Commissioned: 19 September 1970
- Reclassified: FF-1075, 1 July 1975
- Decommissioned: 30 July 1992
- Stricken: 11 January 1995
- Fate: Transferred to Greece, July 1992

History

Greece
- Name: Thraki (F457)
- Acquired: July 1992
- Commissioned: April 1993
- Decommissioned: 6 March 2001
- Fate: Sunk as target

General characteristics
- Class & type: Knox-class frigate
- Displacement: 3,238 tons (4,218 full load)
- Length: 438 ft (133.5 m)
- Beam: 46 ft 9 in (14.25 m)
- Draft: 24 ft 9 in (7.6 m)
- Propulsion: 2 × CE 1200psi boilers; 1 Westinghouse geared turbine; 1 shaft, 35,000 shp (26 MW)
- Speed: over 27 knots (31 mph; 50 km/h)
- Range: 4,500 nautical miles (8,330 km)
- Complement: 18 officers, 267 enlisted
- Sensors & processing systems: AN/SPS-40 Air Search Radar; AN/SPS-10 Surface Search Radar; AN/SQS-26 Sonar; AN/SQR-18 Towed array sonar system; Mk68 Gun Fire Control System
- Electronic warfare & decoys: AN/SLQ-32 Electronics Warfare System
- Armament: one Mk-16 8 cell missile launcher for ASROC and Harpoon missiles; one Mk-42 5-inch/54 caliber gun; Mark 46 torpedoes from four single tube launchers); one Mk-25 BPDMS launcher for Sea Sparrow missiles, later replaced by Phalanx CIWS
- Aircraft carried: one SH-2 Seasprite (LAMPS I) helicopter

USS Trippe (FF-1075) was a Knox-class frigate of the US Navy, built at Westwego, Louisiana, was commissioned in mid-September 1970. In July 1971, following shakedown training in the Caribbean area and a surveillance mission off Haiti, she entered the Boston Naval Shipyard for overhaul and installation of the Basic Point Defense Missile System, which featured short-range "Sea Sparrow" guided missiles in an eight-round launcher on her afterdeck. Trippe was the Navy's first destroyer-type ship to receive this later-widespread contribution to shipboard protection against air and missile attack. The first months of 1972 were spent testing her new weapons and participating in exercises. In June the ship passed through the Panama Canal en route to Southeast Asian waters, where she provided Vietnam War aircraft carrier escort and naval gunfire support services during July and August. Trippe then went to the Indian Ocean and Persian Gulf areas, visiting many ports in a region that would see increasing U.S. Navy activity in the coming decades. She returned to the U.S. East Coast in December 1972, after a deployment that had taken her completely around the World.

During an overhaul in 1973, Trippe was refitted to allow her to operate the larger helicopters of the Light Airborne Multi-Purpose System (LAMPS). From August of that year into January 1974 she made her first tour with the Sixth Fleet in the Mediterranean. A second cruise to the Indian Ocean and Middle East followed in January–May 1975. Trippe and Joseph Hewes were the first USN ships to make an operational transit of the Suez Canal after it was reopened in 1975. Reclassified in mid-year as a frigate, with the new designation FF-1075, she spent the last three months of 1975 and the first five of 1976 in shipyard hands. Trippe returned to the Middle East Force in March–July 1977 and returned to the Mediterranean for her second Sixth Fleet deployment in April–October 1978. The next year she cruised around South American as part of exercise "Unitas XX" and operated off West Africa.

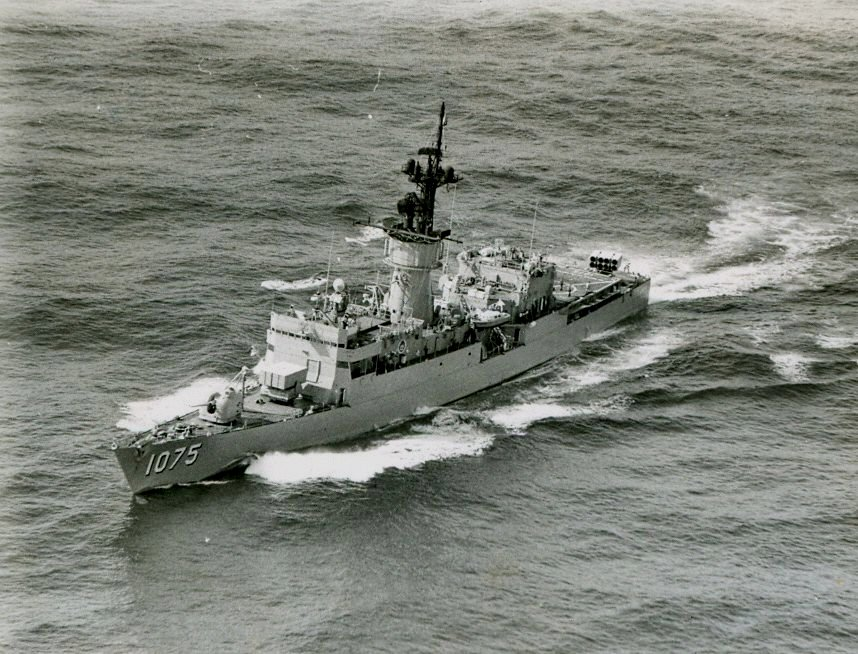

The busy frigate made four more Mediterranean deployments during the following decade, in 1982, 1983, 1985 and 1987. Some of her 1983 tour also involved visiting ports in West Africa, the southern Atlantic, and the Indian Ocean. In the mid-'80s she was also modernized, receiving a seakeeping-enhancing bulwark on her bow and the Close-In Weapons System. The latter's fast shooting radar-controlled 20 mm gun mount was installed on her afterdeck to improve her defenses against cruise missiles.

On 19 April 1989, Trippe collided with fleet oiler Platte off the coast of Jacksonville, Florida resulting in a below the waterline tear in the hull and the smashing of the auxiliary diesel generator's exhaust vent, which rendered the ship completely powerless. Trippe was towed to Charleston SC by an ocean going tug boat. This was the same day as the USS Iowa turret explosion, also part of FLEETEX 3-89.

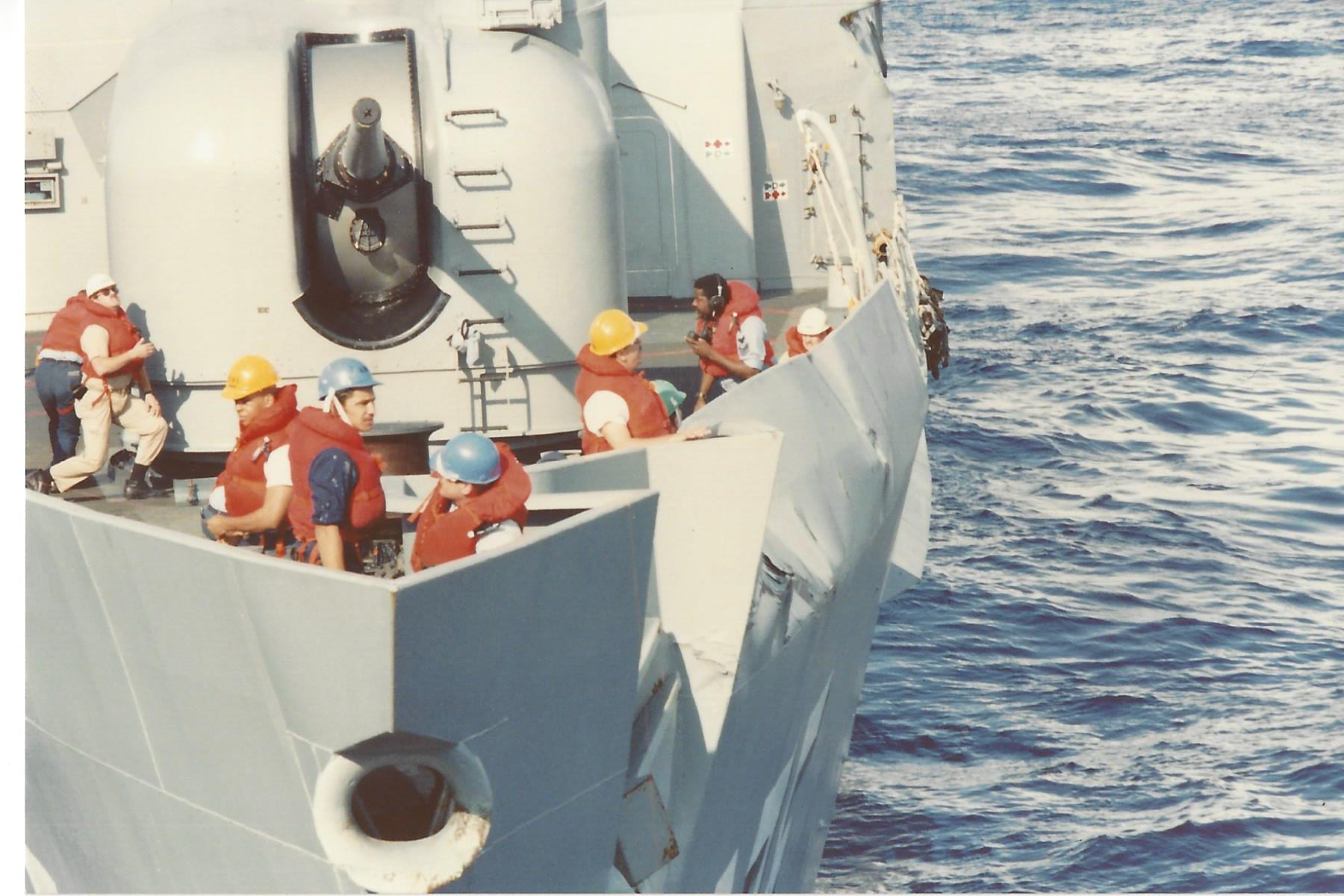
Shot from USS Stump DD 978 just prior to connecting tow line

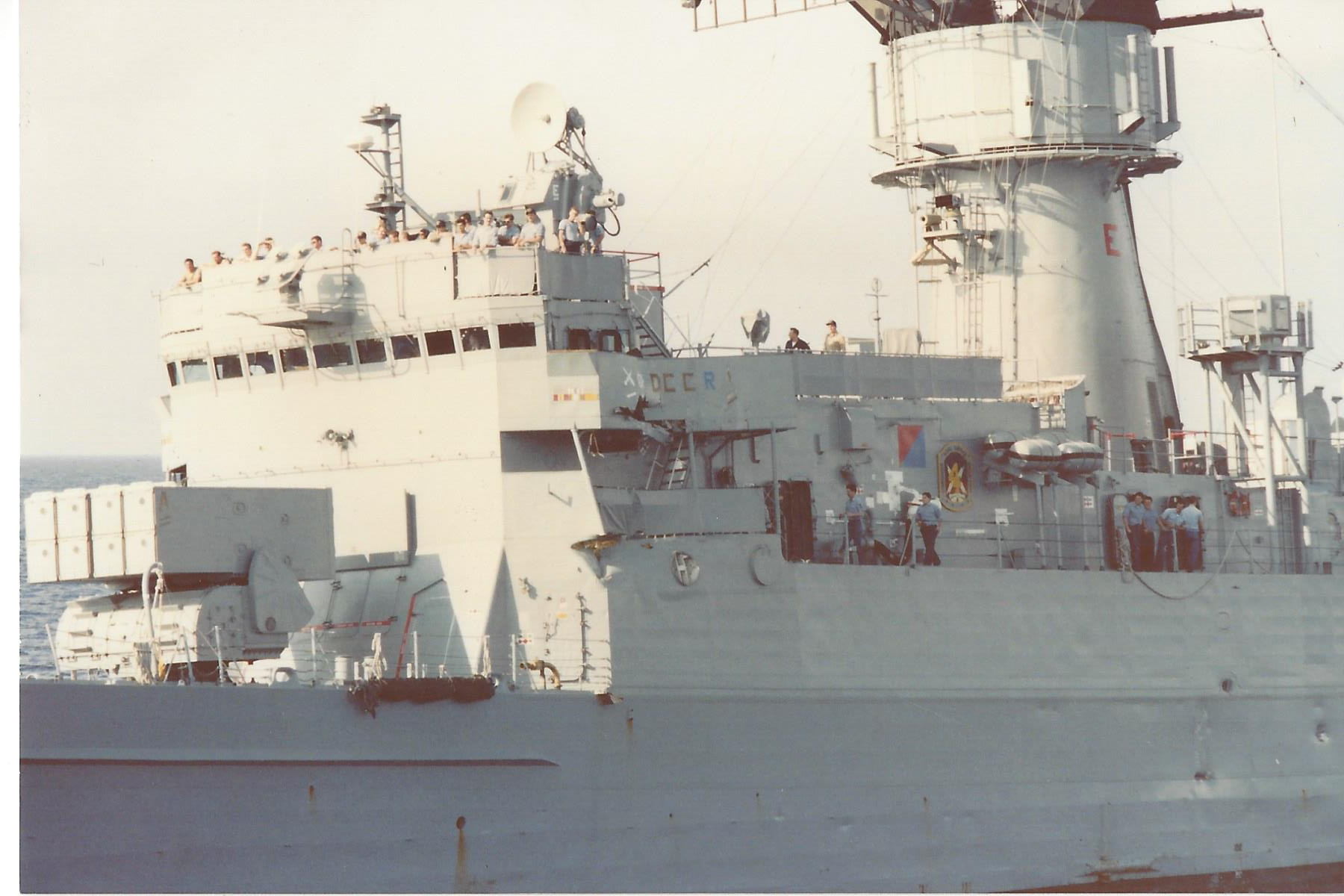
Damage to port bridge wing

She spent most of the late 1980s and the early 1990s operating in the Caribbean Sea area, with counter-narcotics service taking much of her effort. At the end of July 1992, Trippe was decommissioned and leased to Greece. The Hellenic Navy placed her in commission in April 1993 as Thraki, and she was formally sold to that nation in 2001. A major lube oil fire occurred while at Naval Dock Crete in 2003 melting the superstructure and destroying the interior of the ship.

USS Trippe was named in honor of Lieutenant John Trippe (1785–1810), a hero of the Tripolitan War.
