= Juan Trippe =

American aviation entrepreneur (1899–1981)

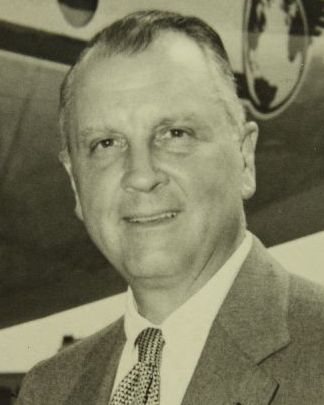
- Trippe in front of a Pan Am Stratocruiser
- Born: Juan Terry Trippe; June 27, 1899; Sea Bright, New Jersey, U.S.
- Died: April 3, 1981 (aged 81); New York City, U.S.
- Resting place: Green-Wood Cemetery
- Education: Yale University (BA)
- Occupations: Airline entrepreneur Founder of InterContinental Hotels & Resorts
- Spouse: Elizabeth "Betty" Stettinius (m. 1928)
- Children: 4
- Relatives: John Trippe (great-great-grandfather)
- Awards: Daniel Guggenheim Medal (1941); Wright Brothers Memorial Trophy (1966); Presidential Medal of Freedom (posthumous, 1985)

Juan Terry Trippe (June 27, 1899 – April 3, 1981) was an American commercial aviation pioneer, entrepreneur and the founder of Pan American World Airways, one of the iconic airlines of the 20th century. He was involved in the introduction of the Sikorsky S-42, which opened trans-Pacific airline travel; the Boeing 307 Stratoliner, which introduced cabin pressurization to airline operations; the Boeing 707, which started a new era in low-cost jet transportation; and the Boeing 747 jumbo jets. He also founded InterContinental Hotels & Resorts.

== Early life and education ==
Trippe was born in Sea Bright, New Jersey, on June 27, 1899, the great-great-grandson of Lieutenant John Trippe, captain of the USS Vixen.

Trippe had no Hispanic ancestry; his Spanish given name "Juan" is taken from his maternal grandmother's second husband, a wealthy Irish colonist from Venezuela named Juan Terry. Trippe's father's ancestors were Northern Europeans who settled in Maryland in 1664. Trippe used his unique name to his advantage when dealing with Latin American power players.

Trippe attended the Bovea School and graduated from The Hill School in 1917.

He enrolled at Yale University but left to apply for flight training with the United States Navy when the United States entered World War I. After completing training in June 1918, he was designated a Naval Aviator and was commissioned as an ensign in the United States Navy Reserve. The war ended before he saw combat. Demobilized from active duty, he returned to Yale. While there, he was a member of St. Anthony Hall and of the Skull and Bones society. Trippe was treasurer at the first meeting of the National Intercollegiate Flying Association in 1920. He graduated from Yale in 1921.

== Career ==
After graduation, Trippe began working on Wall Street, but soon became bored. In 1922, he raised money from his Yale classmates, selling them stock in his new airline: an air-taxi service for the rich and powerful called Long Island Airways. Again tapping his wealthy college friends, Trippe invested in an airline named Colonial Air Transport, which was awarded a new route and an airmail contract on October 7, 1925. Interested in operating to the Caribbean, Trippe created the Aviation Corporation of the Americas, based in Florida. The company would evolve into Pan American Airways—Pan Am for short—and eventually become the unofficial United States flag carrier.

Pan Am's first flight took off on October 19, 1927, from Key West, Florida, to Havana, Cuba, in a hired Fairchild FC-2 floatplane being delivered to West Indian Aerial Express in the Dominican Republic. The return flight from Havana to Key West, in a Pan Am Fokker F.VII, took place October 29, being delayed from October 28 by rain.

Later, Trippe bought the China National Aviation Corporation (CNAC) to provide domestic air service in the Republic of China, and became a partner in Panagra. In the 1930s. Pan Am became the first airline to cross the Pacific Ocean with the China Clipper.

Trippe was the of the airline for all but about two years between the founding of the company and World War II. "Sonny" Whitney, a stockholder, managed to seize this position. He later regretted his action and allowed Trippe to retake it. For a long time Trippe refused to pardon Whitney. At one point, he even agreed to meet Whitney for lunch for a reconciliation, but changed his mind and turned around shortly after departing from his office in the Chrysler Building.

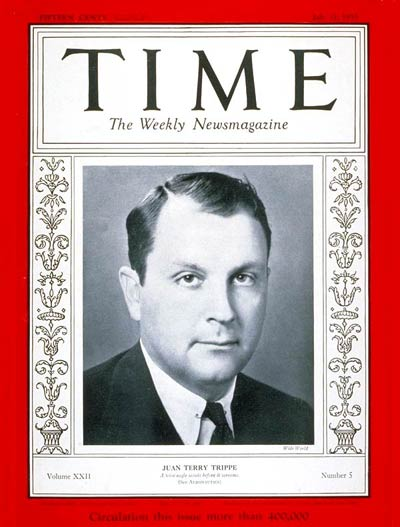
Trippe on the cover of Time magazine, July 1933

Pan Am continued to expand worldwide throughout World War II. Trippe is responsible for several innovations in the airline world. A firm believer in the idea of air travel for all, Trippe is credited as the father of the tourist class in the airline industry, and was the driving force behind Pan Am's formation of the InterContinental hotel group.

Trippe quickly recognized the opportunities presented by jet aircraft and ordered several Boeing 707 and Douglas DC-8 airplanes. Pan Am's first scheduled jet flight was operated on October 26, 1958, by 707 Clipper America from Idlewild International Airport (now JFK) to Le Bourget Airport, Paris. The new jets allowed Pan Am to cut the flight time nearly in half, introduce lower fares, and fly more passengers in total.

In 1965, Trippe asked his friend Bill Allen at Boeing to produce an airplane much larger than the 707. The result was the Boeing 747, and Pan Am was the first customer. Trippe signed the 747 contract on Boeing's 50th anniversary. Originally, Trippe believed the 747 would ultimately be destined to haul cargo only and would be replaced by faster, supersonic aircraft which were then being developed. The supersonic airliners failed to materialize, with the exception of the Concorde and Tupolev Tu-144, and the 747 became an iconic image of international travel. In 1965, Trippe received the Tony Jannus Award for his distinguished contributions to commercial aviation.

Trippe gave up the presidency of the airline in 1968. He continued to attend meetings of the board of directors and maintained an office in the company's Park Avenue office tower.

== Personal life ==
Trippe was a member of The Royal and Ancient Golf Club of St Andrews in Scotland and a member of Devon Yacht Club and president of the Maidstone Club in East Hampton, New York, from 1940 to 1944.

Trippe married Elizabeth "Betty" Stettinius Trippe (1904–1983), the sister of United States Secretary of State Edward R. Stettinius Jr., in 1928. They had four children. The couple remained married until Trippe's death in 1981.

== Death and legacy ==
Trippe suffered a stroke in September 1980, which forced him to cut back on his workload; he died after suffering a second stroke at his New York City home on April 3, 1981, at the age of 81. He is buried in Green-Wood Cemetery in Brooklyn.

In 1970, Juan Trippe was inducted into the National Aviation Hall of Fame in Dayton, Ohio.

In 1985, Trippe was posthumously awarded the Medal of Freedom by United States President Ronald Reagan. Trippe was inducted into the Junior Achievement U.S. Business Hall of Fame in 1990. An endowed chair at the Yale University School of Management is the "Juan Trippe Professor in the Practice of International Trade, Finance, and Business".

In 1982, Trippe was inducted into the International Air & Space Hall of Fame at the San Diego Air & Space Museum.

Trippe is widely regarded as the last of the great aviation pioneers, along with industry titans such as American Airlines' C. R. Smith, United Airlines' William A. "Pat" Patterson, Eastern Airlines' Eddie Rickenbacker, TWA's Howard Hughes, and Delta Air Lines' Collett E. Woolman. Under his control, Pan American World Airways became the premier international airline in the world. He is also credited with helping to develop intercontinental airliners, first urging Boeing to make a transatlantic version of the Boeing 707, which prompted Douglas to follow suit with the Douglas DC-8.

== In popular culture ==
A character based on Trippe was played by Pat O'Brien in Ray Enright's 1936 film The China Clipper. Trippe was played by Alec Baldwin in Martin Scorsese's 2004 film The Aviator.
