= Tripp Hill =

Mountain in New York, United States

- Location within New York Location within the United States

Highest point
- Elevation: 2,012 feet (613 m)
- Coordinates: 42°45′26″N 74°57′44″W

Geography
- Location: NNE of Fly Creek, New York, U.S.
- Topo map: USGS

Tripp Hill is a mountain located in Central New York region of New York north-northeast of Fly Creek.
