= Tripp Lake =

Lake in Minnesota, United States

- Location within Minnesota
- Location: Hubbard County, Minnesota
- Coordinates: 46°51′8″N 94°45′56″W
- Type: lake

Tripp Lake is a lake in Hubbard County, Minnesota.

Tripp Lake was named after Charles Tripp, a pioneer who settled there. The lake is 145 acres (59 hectares) in size, and reaches depths of up to 65 feet (20 m).

== See also ==
- List of lakes in Minnesota
