= The Trip: Created by Snow Patrol =

Compilation album by Snow Patrol
- Released: 1 November 2004
- Genre: Alternative rock, Indie rock, Electronic, House
- Length: 103:47
- Label: Family Recordings
- Compiler: Gary Lightbody

Snow Patrol chronology
Final Straw (2003)	The Trip: Created by Snow Patrol (2004)	Late Night Tales: Snow Patrol (2009)

The Trip: Created by Snow Patrol is a mix album compiled by alternative rock band Snow Patrol's vocalist Gary Lightbody and released through the Family Recordings label on 1 November 2004. Issued as a 2×CD and a 3×LP Vinyl, the album was the fifth in The Trip series. In the CD release, Disc I was called "Bert" and Disc II was "Ernie". Lightbody wished to compile his own Trip album after listening to the album compiled by Tom Middleton. Lightbody credits his DJ friend Roy Kerr, better known as The Freelance Hellraiser, for putting together most of the songs (which he then picked for the album), joking about directing Kerr "from the comfy chair". Lightbody also wishes to compile a similar album with Kerr in the future.

The compilation received generally positive reviews from music critics, with one calling it a "cohesive, nuanced listening experience". The general feeling among critics was that the album wasn't for a casual Snow Patrol fan. Lightbody's taste in music was praised, with one critic calling it "exquisitely eclectic". However, one critic felt that the selections were the same favored by "indieists everywhere".

== Track listing ==
Disc I: "Bert"
No.	Title	Artist(s)	Length
1.	"Way Behind"	Low & Spring Heel Jack	3:43
2.	"Expanding in Reproduction"	Emperor Machine	2:11
3.	"My Sex"	Sir Drew	2:44
4.	"Everywhere"	Machines	4:35
5.	"Staring at the Sun"	TV on the Radio	1:36
6.	"Submergible"	Swimming Pool Sound	1:58
7.	"Heartbeats" (Rex the Dog Remix)	The Knife	2:08
8.	"Everything in Alright"	Four Tet	2:16
9.	"Love Lost"	Alan Braxe & Fred Falke	2:44
10.	"You Can't Stop It"	Kojak	3:31
11.	"To our Disco Friends"	Smith n Hack	2:17
12.	"I Can See Clearly Now"	Seelenluft	2:59
13.	"Road Leads Where it's Led"	The Secret Machines	3:38
14.	"Drop the Pressure"	Mylo	4:05
15.	"Fear of Nothing"	Jacknife Lee	2:21
16.	"Everybody Deserves to Be Fucked" (Tomcats in Tokyo Remix)	Sex in Dallas	4:13
17.	"Mushaboom"	Feist	3:39

Disc II: "Ernie"
No.	Title	Artist(s)	Length
1.	"Weird Divide"	The Shins	1:55
2.	"By Your Side"	CocoRosie	3:46
3.	"Rainbow Flows"	Husky Rescue	4:31
4.	"Kissing My Love"	Bill Withers	3:19
5.	"Take Care"	Hot Chip	3:04
6.	"Bow Wow"	The Fiery Furnaces	2:49
7.	"Milking"	Deerhoof	3:31
8.	"Cuts Across the Land"	The Duke Spirit	3:07
9.	"With Arms Outstretched"	Rilo Kiley	3:42
10.	"Christmas Song"	Joy Zipper	3:37
11.	"Girl I'm Gonna Fuck You Up"	Republic of Loose	4:04
12.	"Sleaze"	Harco Pront	1:14
13.	"Green Grass of Tunnel"	múm	4:38
14.	"Does This Have a Name"	Iain Archer	4:37
15.	"Superstar"	Nina Nastasia	5:15

== Reception ==
Professional ratings
Review scores
Source	Rating
Allmusic	3.5/5 stars
Drowned in Sound	(6/10)
musicOMH	(favorable)
Pitchfork Media	(7.2/10)

Allmusic's Jason Ankeny reviewed the album positively and awarded it 3.5 stars out of 5. He felt that Lightbody's selections weren't too different from "Snow Patrol's own brand of shimmering guitar pop". According to him, this approach worked for, and both, against the album. He further explained: "while the decision to focus on music from the same spectral frequency results in a cohesive, nuanced listening experience, half the fun of past Trip collections is discovering songs from the farthest-flung corners of the vault juxtaposed in unexpected and often revelatory ways." He said that "adventurous listeners should find some compelling new music" on the album and felt that it was a "solid overview of the state of alternative rock circa 2004". He named "With Arms Outstretched," "Staring at the Sun," and "Green Green Grass of Tunnel" the highlights from the album.

musicOMH's John Murphy reviewed the album positively and called it "quite brilliant", but warned that album isn't what Snow Patrol fans might expect. He also said that "the hardcore dance sounds of the first disc in particular may well scare Snow Patrol's casual fan away." He felt the second disc is better than the first: "a more eclectic mix of songs which moves away from the hard dance of disc one". He felt that by the time a listener would reach the end of disc II, they'd be convinced that "Gary Lightbody is a man with some exquisitely eclectic taste in music". He, however advised fans against buying the album if they were expecting a Final Straw. Xfm also called the song selection "eclectic".

Pitchfork's Marc Hogan wrote that he didn't feel the compilation would be good, but he admitted he was "had" at "Everyone Deserves to Be Fucked". He felt that Lou Barlow, Coldplay and My Bloody Valentine were the most notable artists missing from the album. He felt that disc I was better than II. He called the selected tracks "illuminative if rarely breathtaking" and felt they'll "likely yield most listeners a discovery or two". He gave the album 7.2 out of 10. However, Drowned in Sound's Michaela Annot was lesser pleased, saying that the compilation "favours the sort of soft-house-electro simplicity favoured by indieists everywhere". She felt that though "it lacks conherency, flow and form", it made the album "even more endearing". She thought that, "overall, it's a little too anodyne and pleasant", yet had her qualms; "a sneaking suspicion too, that Snow Patrol don't listen to this stuff everyday [sic]" She graded the album 6 out of 10.

== Personnel ==
- Gary Lightbody – compiled by
- Roy Kerr – engineering
- Rex the Dog – remix (track 7 on disc I)
- Tomcats in Tokyo – remix (track 16 on disc I)

== Series ==
- This is part of a short-lived mix album series released by Family Records called "The Trip" and featured compiled albums by Saint Etienne, Tom Middleton, Dirty Vegas, among others, plus most notably Jarvis Cocker & Steve Mackey of Pulp
