= Tripe (disambiguation) =

Tripe is a type of edible offal from the stomachs of various domestic animals, and is also an informal term for nonsense or rubbish.

Tripe may also refer to:

- John Swete (1752–1821), born John Tripe, English clergyman, artist, antiquary, historian, topographer and author
- Linnaeus Tripe (1822–1902), British photographer
- Mollie Tripe (1870–1939), New Zealand artist and art teacher
- Robert Tripe (1973–2015), New Zealand actor
- A nickname of the Sopwith Triplane First World War fighter aircraft

== See also ==
- Rock tripe, a lichen
