= The Trip (Australian-Canadian band) =

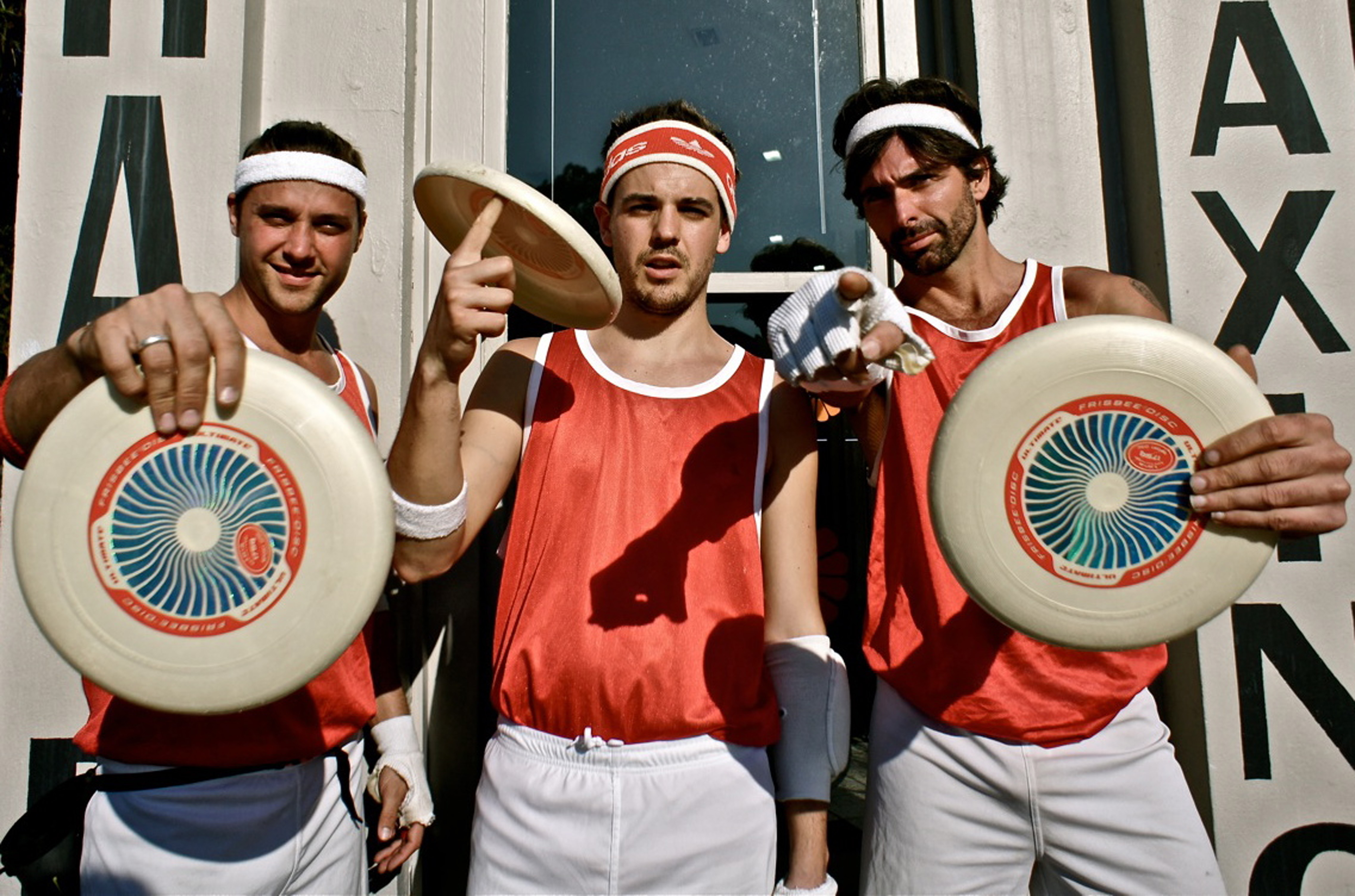
- The Trip with their frisbees from their viral music video

Background information
- Origin: Calgary, Alberta, Canada
- Genres: Funk, Indie Rock
- Years active: 2007–present
- Labels: JDog Records / MGM Distribution (Australia), Ok!Good Records / Sony Music Entertainment / RED Distribution (USA), Ok!Good Records / Universal Music Group (Canada)
- Members: Chad Kendrick; Marco Yellin
- Past members: Wez Roy
- Website: TheBandTheTrip.com

The Trip is an Australian-Canadian, alt-pop/rock band noted for their exciting live performances, and their infamous frisbee skills in the underground scene. The band consists of Chad Kendrick (guitar & vocals), and Marco Yellin (guitar & vocals), and frequently headlines along Australia's east coast, with roots in both Bondi and Manly beaches.

== History ==
Officially formed in late 2010, the members of The Trip had played in a variety of bands together since the early 2000s, having met in the thriving live music scene of Bondi Beach. In 2007, the band travelled to the US to work with Platinum-selling, Grammy nominated producer Sylvia Massy. After spending 8 weeks recording at Radiostar Studios in Northern California, the band returned to Australia in early 2008 with the finished 11-track record. After a brief management period with Martha Troup (manager of INXS frontman Michael Hutchence), the band's independent label JDog Records decided not to release the record in Australia, but to return to the US to promote the band and the record there.

Later in 2008, the band returned to LA to meet producers to continue work on the record. After meeting a range of producers The Trip eventually worked with multiple Grammy winner Thom Russo, Gavin MacKillop and newcomer Chad Gendason on several of the tracks recorded with Massy in 2007. Whilst in LA, the band played a handful of local shows in the South Bay area, and an industry showcase gig at the Viper Room in West Hollywood which saw an unusually packed room for a mid-week gig on a Tuesday night. On return to Australia in early 2009, The Trip had an EP's worth of tracks which would be released under JDog Records act ‘MOJADA’. The heavily produced commercial sound proved palatable with commercial radio with tracks from the EP scoring 3 sync deals including a major national TVC campaign for AAPT, and a Channel 10 promotional spot. A further track from the EP also scored the band (then Mojada) a win at the MusicOz Independent Music Awards for ‘Best Rock Artist’ 2010.

The band however were still not satisfied that their record was complete and ready for release, so during 2009 they had begun travelling to Adelaide, SA to begin the laborious task of re-recording their entire record from scratch with a new producer Michael Sinclair who one of the band members previously went to high school with. They spent the most part of the next 12 months travelling between Sydney and Adelaide to complete the record between side jobs and touring. Eventually, the record was completed again towards the end of 2010. At that time, satisfied at last with the finished product the band and their label JDog Records mutually agreed that the record should be released under a new name and band image. Later in 2010 JDog Records settled on ‘The Band The Trip’ as the new name and releasing act for the record.

In September 2011 after working with the artist development company A&R Worldwide based in Los Angeles, The Trip signed a Licence deal with Ok!Good Records for the US and Canada.

== Discography ==
=== EP – Volume 1 ===
Released on 1 April 2011 through MGM Distribution, Volume 1 is the debut release for The Trip. Containing 3 shortened edits from their debut record release: ‘On The First Time’, ‘Still Water’ and ‘Sweet Surrender’. EP Volume 1 includes additional remixes of ‘On The First Time’ by The Beat Live Project, and Dead Sexy (Paris). The exclusive ‘digital only’ release includes a bonus track from their 2009 US remix trip ‘Don’t Give Up’ recorded and co-written by Chad Gendason.

‘On The First Time’ was released as the single from Volume 1, gaining several regional and community radio adds. The track also received support from the Austereo digital radio station Radar. While Nova (radio network) also played the track, while featuring the band's Frisbee prowess in a challenge pitting the band against their radio presenters.

The quirky music video was played widely on Rage, Channel [V] and Music Max. The video, directed by Nicholas Livingston sees the band exploring their inner Frisbee fetish pulling of stunts and street tricks in an adapted Frisbee game known as ‘Street Freestyle’.

In North America, the track and music video were played and featured on various radio stations, and music blog sites in the US, and Canada.

=== Debut Record ===
The Trip's debut record is scheduled for release early in 2012 through Ok!Good Records in the US and Canada.

== Members ==
=== The Band ===
- Chad Kendrick
- Wesley Roy
- Marco Yellin

== More Info ==
=== Labels / Management ===
- JDog Records (Australia)
- Ok!Good Records (USA / Canada)

=== Associated acts ===
- Mojada
- Jada
- Superfew
