= John Trippe =

US Navy officer (1785–1810)

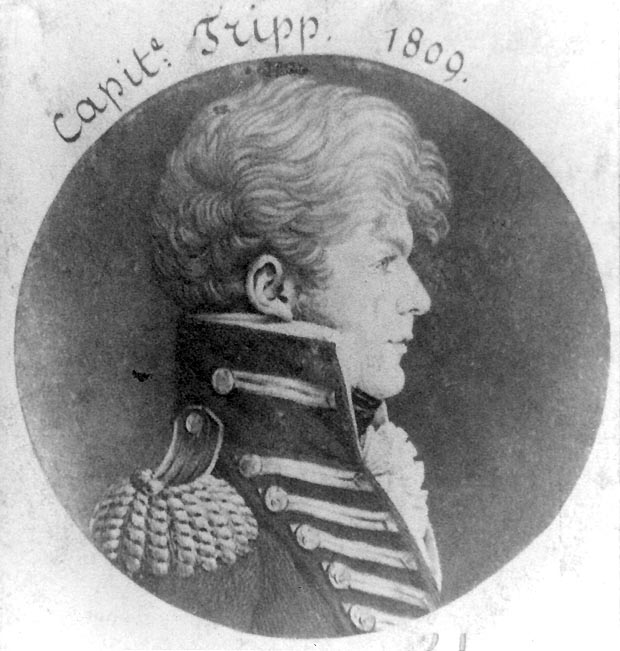
- Sketch of Trippe (1809)
- Born: 1785; Dorchester County, Maryland, U.S.
- Died: July 9, 1810 (aged 24–25); Gulf of Mexico
- Relatives: Juan Trippe (great-great-grandson)
- Military career
- Allegiance: USA
- Branch: Navy
- Service years: 1799–1810
- Rank: Lieutenant
- Commands: Enterprise, Vixen
- Conflicts: Quasi-War; First Barbary War

Signature
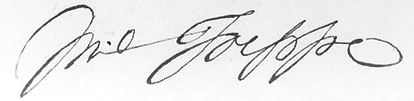

John Trippe (1785 – 9 July 1810) was an officer in the United States Navy during the Quasi-War with France and the First Barbary War.

== Biography ==
Born in Dorchester County, Maryland, Trippe was appointed a midshipman in the Navy on 5 April 1799. During the Quasi-War with France, he made his first cruise in the frigate Constitution and later served in the schooner Experiment. On 21 May, he was assigned to Commodore Richard Dale's flagship President, and he served in her until early 1802 in operations against the Tripolitan corsairs in the Mediterranean.

He returned to the United States in April 1802 and received a furlough to make a mercantile voyage. On 24 May 1803, the Navy Department ordered Trippe to Vixen as an acting lieutenant. The schooner sailed for the Mediterranean on 3 August and joined Commodore Edward Preble's squadron off Tripoli on 14 September 1803.

Lieutenant Trippe served with distinction in the Mediterranean until the fall of 1805. On 3 August 1804, he led his crew of Gunboat Number 6, manned by another midshipman and nine sailors, to victory over the 36-man crew of a large Tripolitan boat. Trippe and his men boarded the enemy, and Trippe himself grappled with the leader of the pirates. Though his adversary towered over him, Lt. Trippe used his own agility and tenacity to emerge victorious in a desperate hand-to-hand struggle. Seriously wounded, he was unable to participate in the next three of Preble's five attacks on Tripoli. However, by the beginning of September, he had recovered sufficiently to resume command of Gunboat No. 6 for the fifth and final assault carried out on the 3d. For his gallantry in action against the Barbary pirates, Lt. Trippe received a sword and a commendation from Congress.

Trippe returned to the United States in November 1805, but 1806 found him back on duty in the Mediterranean. In 1808, Trippe served at Charleston, South Carolina, enforcing the embargo legislation. He took command of Enterprise on 23 January 1809, departed New York on 24 June, and headed for the Netherlands. On 31 July, he reached Amsterdam, where he delivered official dispatches and conducted negotiations which helped cement commercial relations between the Netherlands and the United States. Having helped open Dutch ports to American shipping, he weighed anchor on 10 October and reentered New York harbor on 2 December.

On 26 April, Trippe transferred to the command of Vixen and, a month later, departed New Castle, Delaware, bound for New Orleans, Louisiana. Off Stirrup Key on 24 June, Vixen came under the fire of a British ship, HMS Moselle. When summoned on board the Britisher, Trippe refused, cleared Vixen for action, and demanded an explanation of Moselle's untoward action. Her captain responded with an apology, stating that he had mistaken the American man-of-war for a Frenchman. Vixen then continued peacefully on her way and put into Havana, Cuba, six days later. On 9 July 1810, while en route from Havana to New Orleans, Lt. Trippe died of yellow fever.

He was the great-great-grandfather of Juan T. Trippe, Pan Am's founder and Chairman, and great-great-great-grandfather of artist Jim Trippe.

== Namesakes ==
Four ships in the United States Navy have been named USS Trippe for him.
