= ROKS Gwangyang =

ROKS Gwangyang is the name of two Republic of Korea Navy warships:

- ROKS Gwangyang (ATS-28), a Edenton-class salvage and rescue ship from 1996 to 2015.
- ROKS Gwangyang (ATS-32), a Tongyeong-class salvage and rescue ship from 2016 to present.
