= USS Beaufort (ATS-2) =

Edenton-class salvage and rescue ship

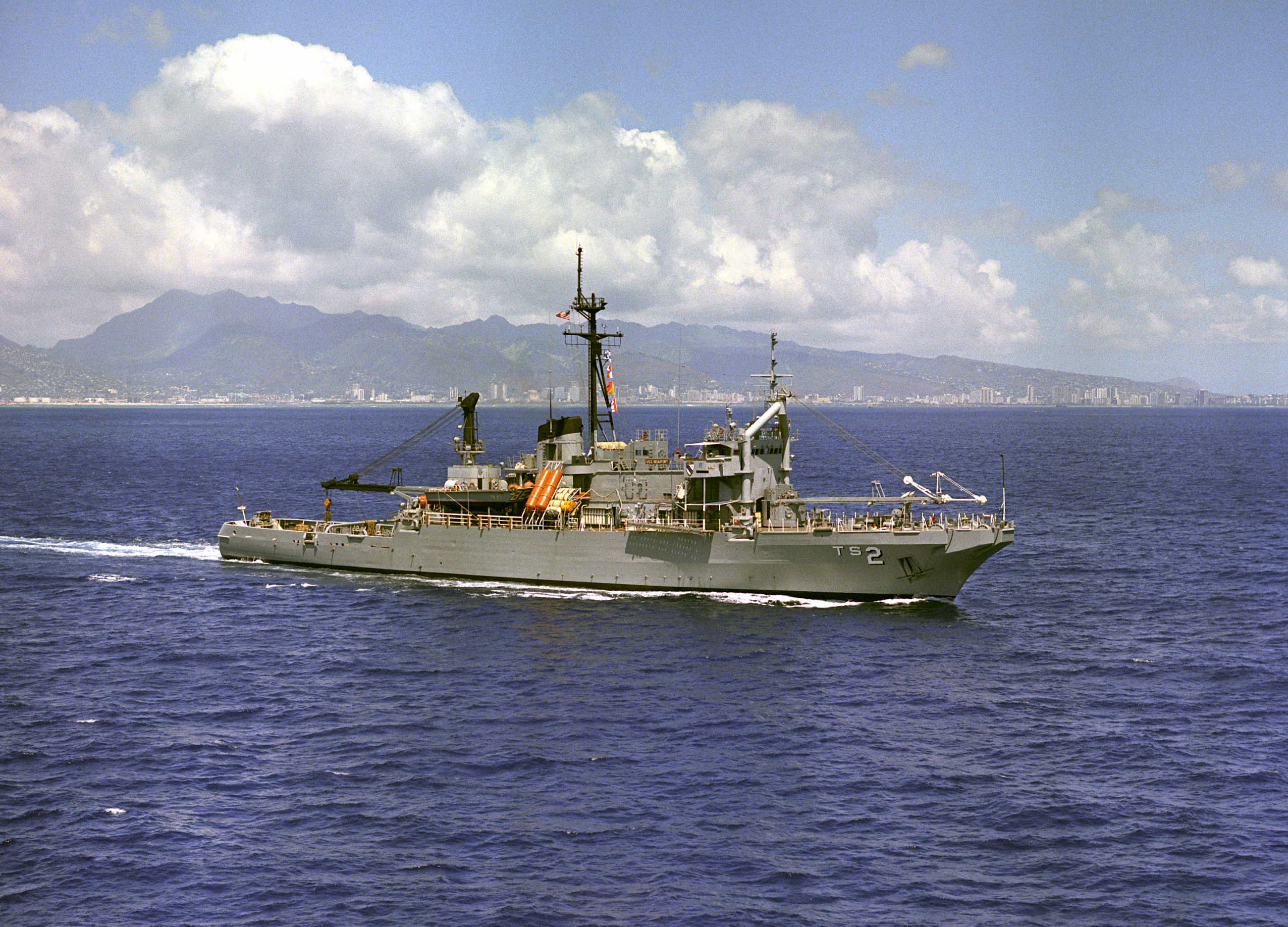
- USS Beaufort underway on 17 April 1985

History

United States
- Name: USS Beaufort
- Namesake: City of Beaufort, South Carolina
- Builder: Brooke Marine, Oulton Broad, Lowestoft, United Kingdom
- Laid down: 19 February 1968
- Launched: 1 December 1968
- Sponsored by: Mrs. Waldemar F. A. Wendt
- Commissioned: 22 January 1972 as USS Beaufort (ATS-2)
- Decommissioned: 8 March 1996
- Stricken: 12 December 1996
- Home port: Pearl Harbor, Hawaii
- Honors and awards: Navy Unit Commendation
- Fate: Sold and transferred under the Security Assistance Program to South Korea, 29 August 1996

General characteristics
- Class & type: Edenton-class salvage and rescue ship
- Tonnage: 3,484 tons
- Displacement: 2,592 tons
- Length: 283 feet (86 m)
- Beam: 59 feet (18 m)
- Draft: 17 ft (5.2 m), 18 ft (5.5 m)max
- Propulsion: Diesel, twin screws
- Complement: 9 Officers, 108 Enlisted
- Armament: 6 × 0.5 in (12.7 mm) mounts; 2 × 20 mm mounts; 2 × Phalanx CIWS turrets

USS Beaufort (ATS-2) was an Edenton-class salvage and rescue ship acquired by the U.S. Navy in 1972 and maintained in service until struck in 1996. Beaufort spent her entire career in the Pacific Ocean, based out of Pearl Harbor and then Sasebo, Japan, and provided salvage and rescue services where needed from the Western Pacific to the North Pacific.

== Construction ==
The fifth ship to be so named by the Navy, Beaufort (ATS-2) was laid down on 19 February 1968 at Lowestoft, England, by Brooke Marine Ltd.; launched on 20 December 1968; sponsored by Mrs. Waldemar F. A. Wendt; delivered to the Navy at the Norfolk Naval Shipyard on 5 January 1972; and commissioned there on 22 January 1972.

== Naval service ==
Beaufort completed outfitting at the Norfolk Naval Shipyard on 5 April 1972 and moved first to the Naval Operating Base, Norfolk, Virginia, for deperming and thence to Little Creek, Virginia, to load in preparation for the voyage to Pearl Harbor.

She made an overnight stop at one of her namesake cities, Beaufort, South Carolina, on 14 and 15 April and a two-day visit to Port Royal, South Carolina, from 15 to 17 April before resuming her voyage to Hawaii. The salvage tug transited the Panama Canal on 24 April and headed up the U.S. West Coast of North America to San Diego, arriving there on 3 May. Five days later, Beaufort put to sea on the last leg of her voyage.

She arrived in Pearl Harbor on 15 May and became a unit of Service Squadron (ServRon) 5. The ship remained in port until 5 June at which time she began shakedown training in the Hawaiian Islands operating area.

The salvage tug completed shakedown training on 23 June and soon began diver and salvage training. August brought final contract trials; and, in September, she resumed salvage training and capability evaluation. Between 13 October and 15 November, she towed the former Observation Island (AG-154) to San Francisco, and returned to Pearl Harbor. She arrived back in Pearl Harbor on 15 November and began post-shakedown availability.

== First Western Pacific Ocean deployment ==
That repair period occupied her for the rest of 1972 and ended on 15 March 1973. At that time, she resumed normal operations out of Pearl Harbor. Salvage training kept her busy until 16 May when she got underway for her first deployment to the western Pacific. Beaufort stopped at Midway Island and Guam before arriving in the Philippine Islands at Subic Bay on 8 June. She conducted operations in the vicinity of Subic Bay until the beginning of July. At that time, the salvage tug got underway for Vietnam. Between 8 and 22 July, she served as a support ship for the minesweepers engaged in Operation End Sweep, the removal of mines from Haiphong harbor in North Vietnam.

== Losing her tows in a storm ==
She returned to Subic Bay late in July for a short period of upkeep. From there, the salvage tug went to Naha, Okinawa, to pick up three pontoon barges for towing to Ream, Cambodia. Beaufort departed Naha on August first and shaped a course for Ream, however Beaufort encountered a storm and all three barges broke their tow lines so Beaufort's gunners mates sank all three barges so they were not floating around the open ocean. While in Ream Beaufort came under attack from the jungle and she returned fire with her 50 caliber machine guns. At the time there was a disabled Cambodian ship so the Captain of the Beaufort directed the Captain of the Cambodian ship, and a minor argument ensued the Captain of the Cambodian ship relented resulting in Beaufort towing the disabled Cambodian ship out of harms way.

While in Ream she picked up another tow, a Cambodian Landing Craft, Infantry (LCI), for the voyage back to Subic Bay. The salvage tug reached her destination on 19 August. On the 27th, she got underway for Hong Kong where she made a storm-induced, extended port visit. Beaufort departed Hong Kong on 8 September and headed back toward the Philippines. On the approach to Subic Bay, she took USS Tripoli (LPH-10) in tow and brought her into port on the 10th. After Beaufort reached port, the United States Marines bought the crew of the Beaufort all of the beer they could drink anywhere on the main street of Magsaysay Street in Olongapo, Subic Bay.

She put to sea again on 25 September to help to refloat the grounded USNS Sgt. Jack J. Pendleton (T-AKV-5) and returned to Subic Bay from that mission on 9 October. The crew of the Pendelton ran aground on the coral shoal off of North Vietnam. The Pendleton was 10 degrees off course during a storm. It was hauling ammunition to South Vietnam. The seas were heavy, with high waves being pushed by high winds. As the storm subsided, the Beaufort hooked its steel cables to the aft section of the Pendleton and attempted to tow her off of the white coral reef; there was no moving the ship. A barge was called from South Vietnam to unload the ammunition, and get it to U.S. Forces in South Vietnam, the unloading was completed by the sailors of the Pendleton. While the unloading was being completed, the crew of the Beaufort put its Navy divers both Scuba and hardhat into the water to recon the bottom hull of the Pendleton.

The Beaufort hull technician divers noticed a crack in the hull; it was a gap between four inches to twelve inches, and compartments were flooded, which added additional weight. The bow of the Pendleton was protruding approximately twenty feet up toward the sky. Additional ships were dispatched to the scene to assist in pulling the ship off the reef. During the same time, China sent a message stating it owned the island and to stop all procedures and depart the island; North Vietnam also stated it owned the coral reef and to make haste out of the area or it would send a warship to engage the Navy ships, both dispatches were taken seriously, however, no county was taking another operational naval vessel. All towing attempts failed, and a typhoon was closing in on the area. The Beaufort made on final attempt. Another ship rammed the starboard side of the Beaufort, nearly crushing a sailor, as the I-beam of the other ship crushed-in the side of the Beaufort. The ship was hit so hard, the mast began to shake violently, and the men on the bridge were on the deck waiting for it to crash. Beaufort removed all men from the Pendleton and loaded divers into a "Mike Boat" (LCM), landing craft. The divers took dive equipment, and demolitions to the Pendleton, and set charges to the hull. After retreating approximately 1,000 yards, the charges exploded, and the ship was there "for the duration". It was used as a Radar Beacon for aircraft. Beaufort's hull technicians shored its bulkhead with wood and steel until it could get back to port for major repairs.

During repairs, a U.S. Navy destroyer was docked starboard side to Beaufort. The Beaufort was under shipyard repairs. There was a 'wood camel', a floating dock between the ships, for which shipyard workers were painting the hull of the starboard side. The Beaufort was taking on fuel, which had an 'over flow', and dumped into the area between the ships, and surrounded the 'camel' with two men on it; the destroyer was flying a red Bravo flag, taking on ammunition. The Beaufort crew were securing from normal operation for the day, and as sailors were taking showers in the head (bathroom), the shipyard welders arc and metal slag fell into the fuel laden water. The fuel caught fire. The fire alarm sounded, and the 'In Port Scene Leader' hull technician who had the duty day, responded to the fire on the main deck starboard side, he was dressed in his boxer shorts and boots. He dragged out a fire hose, and began to fight the fire, he called for additional fire teams to direct water toward the men on the 'Camel' and for others to rescue the men. Then he directed his fire team to put water onto the destroyer three port side torpedo tubes, which had three live torpedoes; the type one would view on a World War II PT Boat, the Fire Scene Leader of the Beaufort was giving orders to a lieutenant, who refused to listen, so the Fire Scene Leader of Repair Party #3, hosed him to get the Officer away from the torpedoes, as flames were reaching the weapons. The Scene Leader received flash burns on his face, arms, and chest. The men on the camel were later rescued.

Three Fire Teams were on scene that day, and not one man ran from the danger of possible explosions, they stood their post and put the fire out. The Captain was at the fire scene to assist his men. Some of the men of the Fire Teams were Alegra, Allen, Master Chief Belk, Beltzek, Butler, Duke was burned, Kopitar led Team #2, Mecca, Miller, Rogers, Weirsma, Yost, and several others. On the 24th, the salvage tug shaped a course for Sasebo, Japan. She arrived in Sasebo on 29 October and remained there until 4 November. On the latter day, Beaufort took two tank landing ships in tow and began the voyage back to Pearl Harbor. She reentered her home port on 28 November and spent the rest of the year in post-deployment leave and upkeep.

== North Pacific operations ==
From 1 January to 20 May 1974, Beaufort underwent a restricted availability in the Pearl Harbor Naval Shipyard. Following that repair period, she resumed normal operations in the Hawaiian Islands. That employment lasted until 16 August when she stood out of Pearl Harbor in company with USNS Silas Bent (T-AGS-26) bound for Alaskan waters. She operated with Silas Bent until mid-September.

On the 18th, the salvage tug parted company with Silas Bent and laid in a course for Bremerton, Washington. She visited Bremerton from 25 September to 10 October and Vancouver, British Columbia, between 10 and 17 October. During the remainder of October, she made calls at Seattle, Washington; Astoria, Oregon; Longview, Washington; Portland, Oregon; and San Francisco, California. On 4 November, Beaufort departed San Francisco to return to Pearl Harbor. She reentered her home port on 10 November and remained there through the end of 1974.

== Return to the Far East ==
A restricted availability occupied her during most of January 1975. She resumed operations out of Pearl Harbor on the 27th. Type training, diving drills, and local tows kept her busy until 30 June when she entered the Dillingham Shipyard for a pre-deployment restricted availability. Beaufort resumed local operations on 23 August, and they lasted until 8 September when she got underway for the Far East.

The salvage tug stopped at Guam from 15 to 19 September and then continued on to the Philippines. She arrived in Subic Bay on the 24th and operated out of that port until 18 November when she set a course for Japan. Between 24 November and 4 December, Beaufort salvaged some amphibious equipment that had been blown to sea by a storm near Numazu, Japan. On 5 December, she put into Sasebo, Japan, for two days of upkeep. She returned to sea on the 7th, bound for Chinhae, Korea, where she spent the period between 9 and 19 December supporting Republic of Korea Navy salvage training operations. On 20 December, she returned to Sasebo and remained there through the end of the year.

Beaufort departed Sasebo on 3 January 1976 and shaped a course for Taiwan. After visits to Keelung and Tsoying, Taiwan, she conducted five days of salvage training with the Taiwanese Navy before heading back to Subic Bay on the 17th. She operated out of Subic Bay until 14 February when she departed the Philippines for Guam towing Kittaton. The salvage tug brought her charge into Apra Harbor on 22 February and, two days later, got underway with USS Tuscumbia in tow and headed for Midway Island. Beaufort dropped her tow off at Midway on 6 March and continued her voyage back to Pearl Harbor.

The ship arrived at Oahu on 9 March and began a month of post-deployment leave and upkeep. She underwent a restricted availability for the installation of firefighting equipment and new navigational lights during the latter part of April and most of May. She resumed operations out of Pearl Harbor on 27 May. Concluding those operations on 16 August, she reentered the Dillingham Shipyard for a regular overhaul.

The yard work took about a year, occupying the remainder of 1976 and the first eight months of 1977. During the final three months of the overhaul, however, Beaufort put to sea occasionally for tests and evaluations. After 24 May, additional repairs were made at the Pearl Harbor Naval Shipyard. She resumed normal operations in September, conducting refresher training in the local operating area between the 6th and the 25th. Normal operations—salvage training and diving drills—occupied her time until the end of the first week in November.

== Re-deployment to the Western Pacific ==
On the 7th, Beaufort stood out of Pearl Harbor on her way to the western Pacific. She arrived at Apra Harbor, Guam, on 18 November. For the next two weeks, she conducted special operations in the Mariana Islands operating area. On 2 December, she broke off the special operations to evade a typhoon at Buckner Bay, Okinawa. On 7 December, she resumed the special operations which lasted until the 14th.

The following day, the salvage tug reentered Apra Harbor. She departed Guam on the 22d bound for Korea. She reached Pusan on the 26th but departed again the next day for Chinhae. Beaufort provided support services for Swordfish from 28 to 31 December and then headed back to Pusan.

Following a visit to that port on 1 and 2 January 1978, the salvage tug weighed anchor for Japan. She arrived at Sasebo on 4 January once again and began a 15-day upkeep period. On 20 January, Beaufort put to sea for Korea once again. She stopped at Chinhae from the 21st to the 23d, then headed for Numazu, Japan, where she conducted salvage operations between 26 January and 9 February. After a stop at Yokosuka on 10 and 11 February, she towed the former Tensaw to sea for a sinking exercise. She completed that mission on the 17th and laid in a course for Hong Kong. At the end of a four-day call at the British colony, the salvage tug headed for Taiwan where she took part in salvage exercises with elements of the Taiwanese Navy early in March.

== Salvaging a downed F-14 ==
She returned to Hong Kong on 9 March for an 11-day visit before getting underway for Subic Bay. On her way there, however, she received orders diverting her to the Gulf of Thailand to salvage a downed F-14. From 25 to 31 March, conducted recovery operations on the fighter.

On 1 April, Beaufort put into Singapore for a week of liberty and upkeep. She returned to sea on the 9th, bound for surveillance duties in the Trust Territories of the Pacific Islands. That mission continued until 23 April when the ship entered Apra Harbor, Guam, for a two-day port call. On 26 April, she began her voyage home to Oahu. She reached Pearl Harbor on 5 May and began a month of post-deployment leave and upkeep.

On 5 June, Beaufort resumed normal operations with a visit to Lahaina Roads near the island of Maui. There, she conducted a bow-lift exercise on the former Bluegill. Similar duty elsewhere in the Hawaiian Islands and the mid-Pacific operating area occupied her for the rest of the year and into 1979.

== Return to the Western Pacific ==
At the end of January 1979, she entered the Pearl Harbor Naval Shipyard for a restricted availability. Beaufort completed repairs on 11 March and resumed local operations. On 1 April, the salvage tug began preparations for overseas movement and, on the 24th, departed Pearl Harbor for the western Pacific. The ship arrived in Apra Harbor, Guam, on 5 May and operated from that port until the 27th when she got underway for the Philippine Islands.

Beaufort stopped at Legaspi between 1 and 4 June before arriving in Subic Bay on the 6th. For the next four months, she performed the usual U.S. 7th Fleet duty visiting a number of ports, towing ships, and conducting salvage training. On 29 September, she departed Yokosuka, Japan, to return to Hawaii. Beaufort arrived in Pearl Harbor on 10 October and, after post-deployment standdown, resumed local operations on 13 November.

Duty out of Pearl Harbor occupied her time through the next nine months. On 25 August 1980, she got underway for the west coast of the United States. The ship reached Oakland, California, on 1 September and remained there until the 7th. Beaufort headed back to Hawaii on 8 September and arrived there on 15 September. Five days later, she got underway for the western Pacific. The salvage tug arrived in Apra Harbor, Guam, on 6 November. Following a nine-day stopover at Guam, Beaufort weighed anchor for the Philippines. En route, she conducted a surveillance mission in the Trust Territories of the Pacific Islands.

On 26 November, the salvage tug arrived in Subic Bay but remained only until the 30th when she embarked upon a voyage which took her to Thailand and Singapore. Beaufort returned to Subic Bay on 2 January 1981. She operated out of that port until 6 April when she got underway for home. The ship stopped at Guam on 12 April but continued her voyage east on the 13th. Beaufort reentered Pearl Harbor on 28 April and remained there until 8 June when she resumed operations in the Hawaiian Islands.

== Decommissioning ==
Beaufort was decommissioned on 8 March 1996 and was struck from the Navy List on 12 December 1996. She was disposed of through the Security Assistance Program, transfer and cash sale of the hull and transferred to the Republic of Korea Navy on 29 August 1996.

== Honors and awards ==
Qualified Beaufort personnel were authorized the following:

- Combat Action Ribbon
- Joint Meritorious Unit Award
- Navy Unit Commendation
- Navy Meritorious Unit Commendation (3)
- Battle "E" Ribbon (5)
- National Defense Service Medal (2)
- Vietnam Service Medal
- Southwest Asia Service Medal
- Humanitarian Service Medal (Boat People)
- Kuwait Liberation Medal (Kuwait)
