= Tensaw =

Tensaw may refer to:

- Taensa, sometimes spelled Tensaw, a Native American tribe
- Tensaw, Alabama, an unincorporated community in Baldwin County, Alabama, United States
- Tensaw River, a distributary of the Mobile River, in southern Alabama, United States
- USS Tensaw, a Sassaba-class district harbor tug that served the U.S. Navy during World War II
