= USCGC Alex Haley =

U.S. Coast Guard cutter

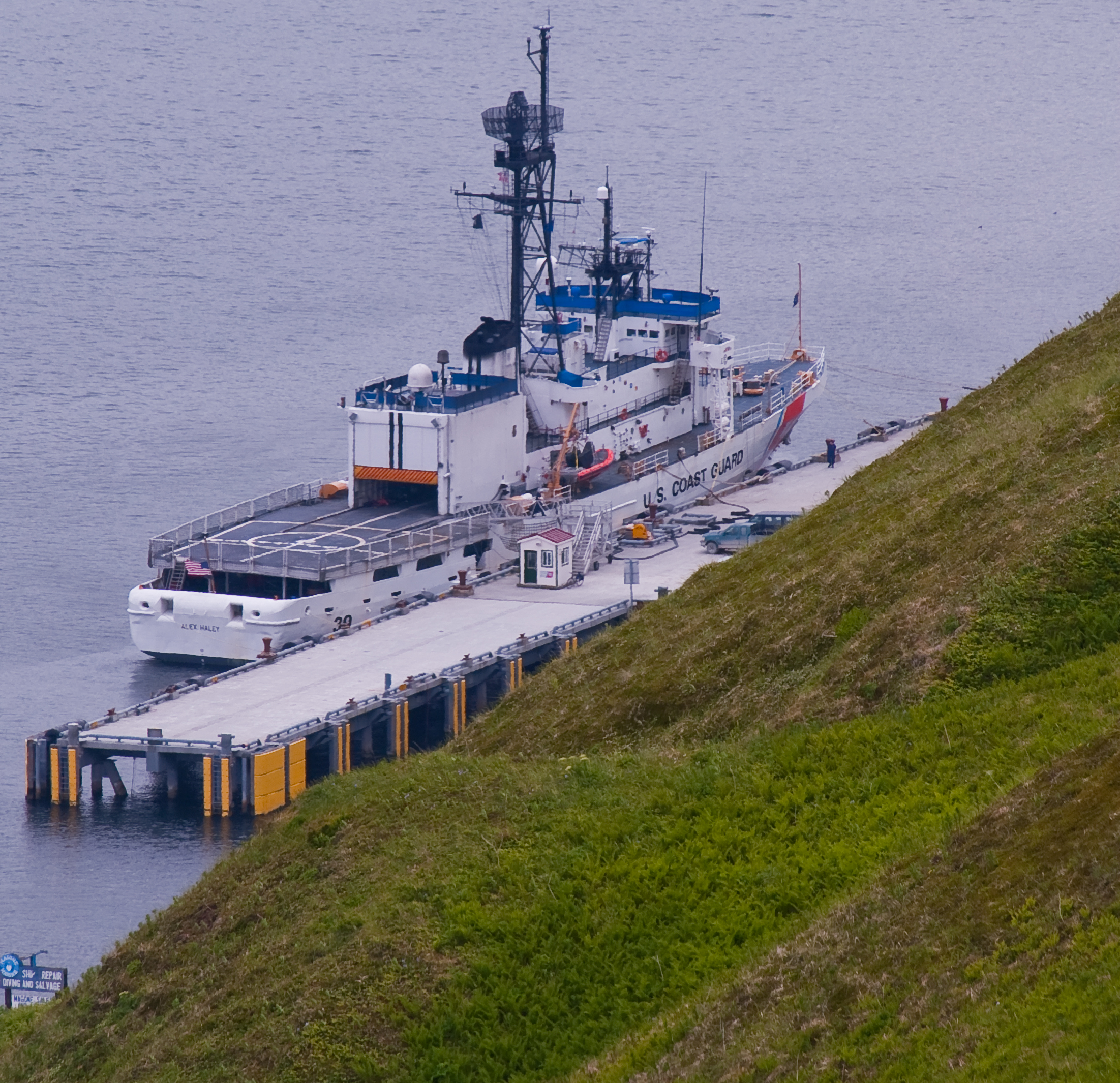

History

United States
- Name: Edenton
- Laid down: 28 March 1967
- Launched: 15 May 1968
- Commissioned: 23 March 1971
- Decommissioned: 29 March 1996
- Stricken: 29 December 1997
- Identification: MMSI number: 338945000; Callsign: NZPO; Hull number: ATS-1
- Fate: Transferred to USCG

United States
- Name: Alex Haley
- Namesake: Alex Haley
- Acquired: 10 July 1999
- Home port: Kodiak, Alaska
- Identification: Hull number: WMEC-39
- Motto: Find the good and praise it.
- Nickname(s): "The Bulldog of the Bering"
- Status: in active service

General characteristics
- Class & type: Edenton-class salvage and rescue ship
- Displacement: 2,592 tons (lt); 3,484 tons (fl)
- Length: 282.67 ft (86.16 m)
- Beam: 59 ft (18 m)
- Draft: 17 ft (5.2 m), 18 ft (5.5 m)max
- Propulsion: 4 Caterpillar diesel engines, twin screws, 6,800 shp (5,100 kW)
- Speed: 18 knots (33 km/h; 21 mph)
- Range: 10,000 miles
- Complement: 10 officers; 90 enlisted; 4 aircrew
- Armament: 2 × Mk 38 Mod 2 25 mm Machine Gun Systems; 2 × 0.5 in (12.7 mm) guns
- Aviation facilities: Flight deck and hangar

USCGC Alex Haley (WMEC-39) is a United States Coast Guard Cutter and former United States Navy vessel that was recommissioned for Coast Guard duty on 10 July 1999. It first entered service as USS Edenton (ATS-1), an Edenton-class salvage and rescue ship on 23 January 1971. In 1995, Edenton won the Marjorie Sterrett Battleship Fund Award for the Atlantic Fleet.

The conversion from a salvage ship to a Coast Guard cutter involved the removal of the stern towing machine, forward crane, and A-frame, and the installation of a flight deck, retractable hangar, and air-search radar. Additionally, her four aging Paxman diesel engines were replaced with four 16-cylinder Caterpillar diesels.

The cutter was named after author and journalist Alex Haley, the first chief journalist of the Coast Guard, the first African-American to reach the rank of chief petty officer, and the Pulitzer Prize-winning author of Roots: The Saga of an American Family. Haley served in the Coast Guard for 20 years.

The vessel's current home port is Kodiak, Alaska at the Coast Guard Base Kodiak from where she carries out her Fishery Law Enforcement and Search and Rescue primary missions.

== In fiction ==
In the 2007 novel Robert Ludlum's The Arctic Event by James H. Cobb, Alex Haley is the ship that takes the heroes out to the island where a Tu-4 laden with anthrax crashed during the Cold War.

In the 2016 novel Goliath by Shawn Corridan & Gary Waid, Alex Haley and USCGC Dauntless are the two Coast Guard cutters that respond to the fire aboard and subsequent stranding of a Russian ULCC.

In the 2026 novel The Sons of Zapata by Patrick Schoff, Alex Haley is the Coast Guard cutter tasked to rescue the Russian fishing trawler Anna Karenina.

== Photos ==
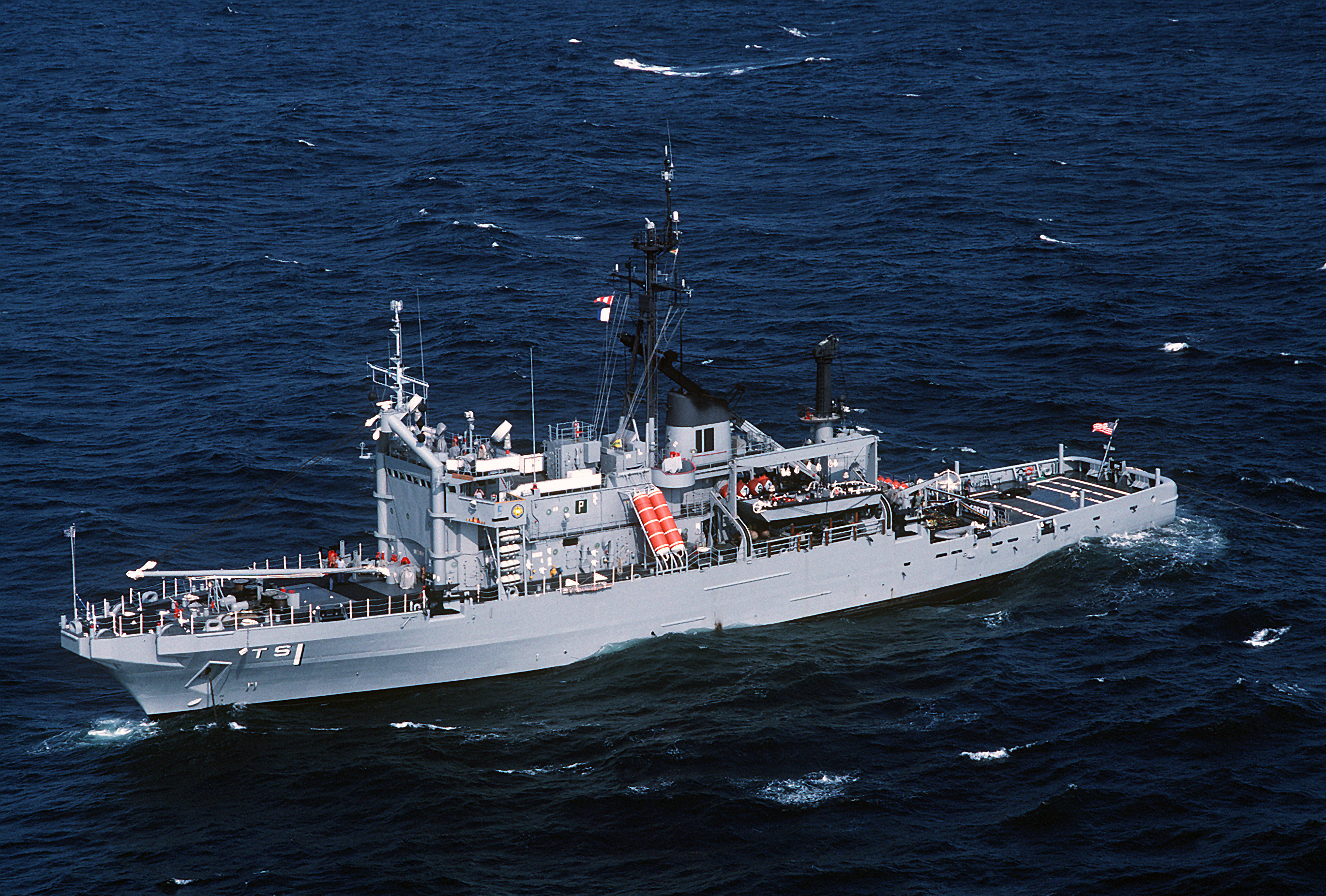
USS Edenton before becoming Alex Haley

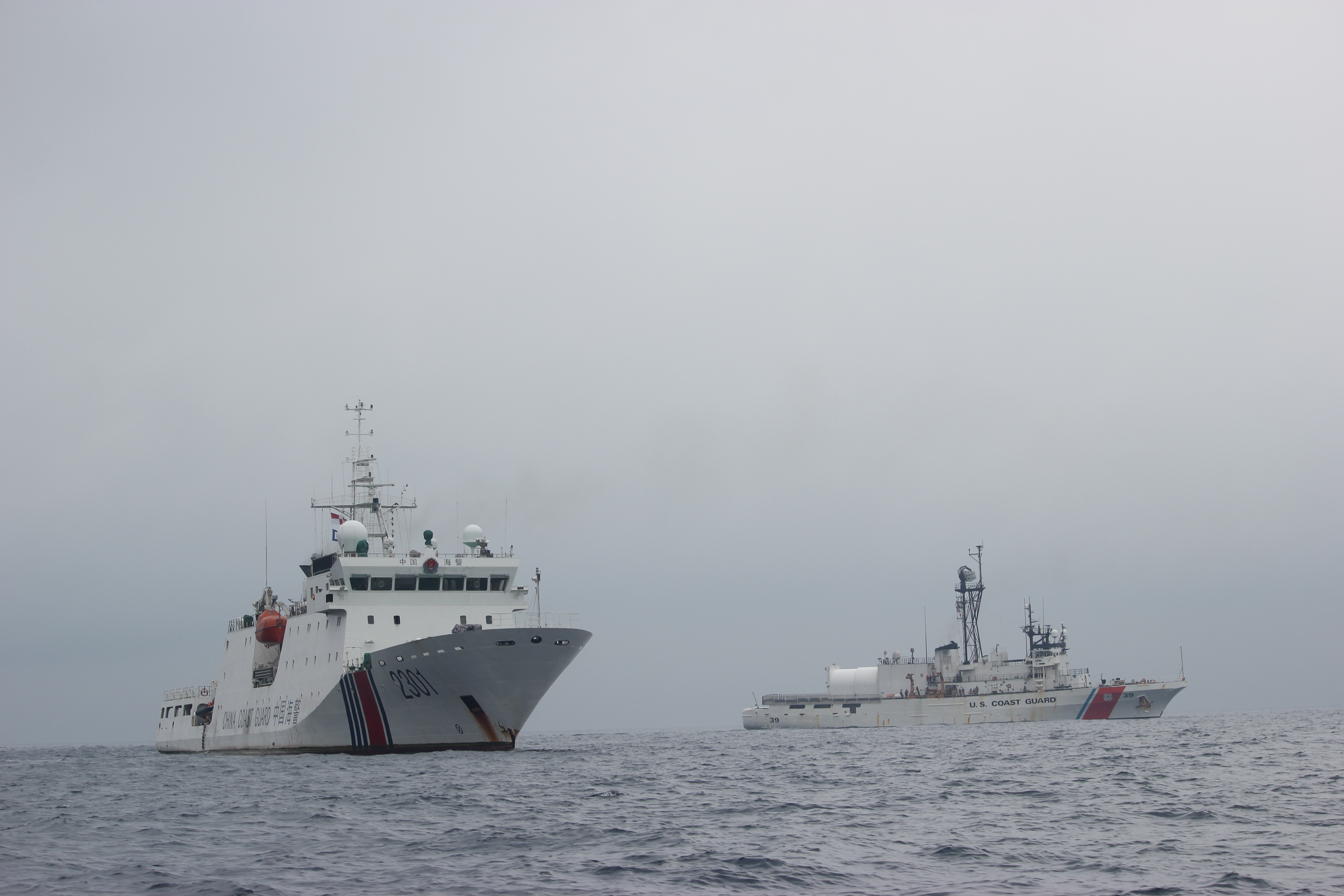
USCGC Alex Haley in Sea of Japan

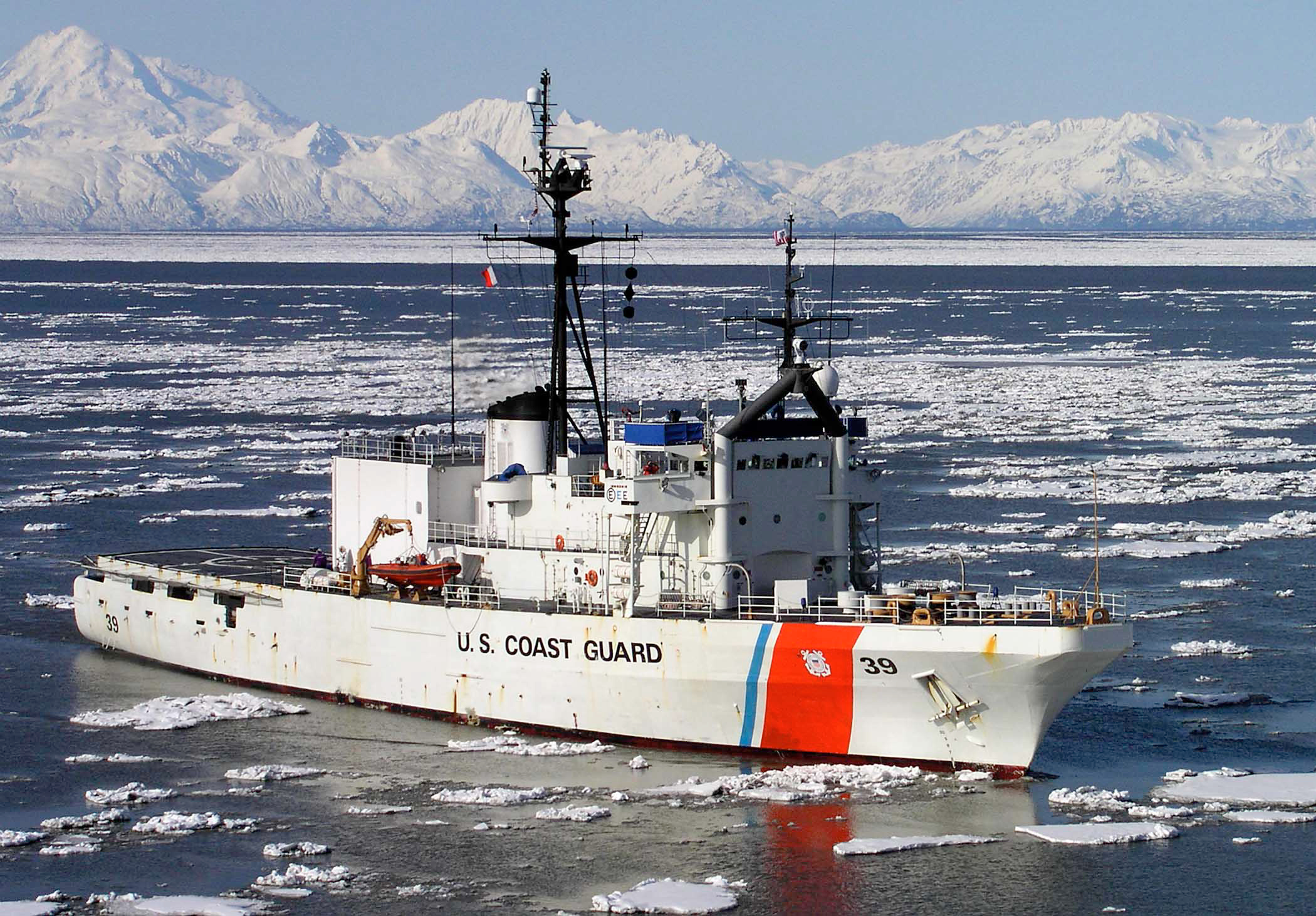
USCGC Alex Haley on Patrol in Cook Inlet, Alaska
