= USS Brunswick (ATS-3) =

Edenton-class salvage and rescue ship

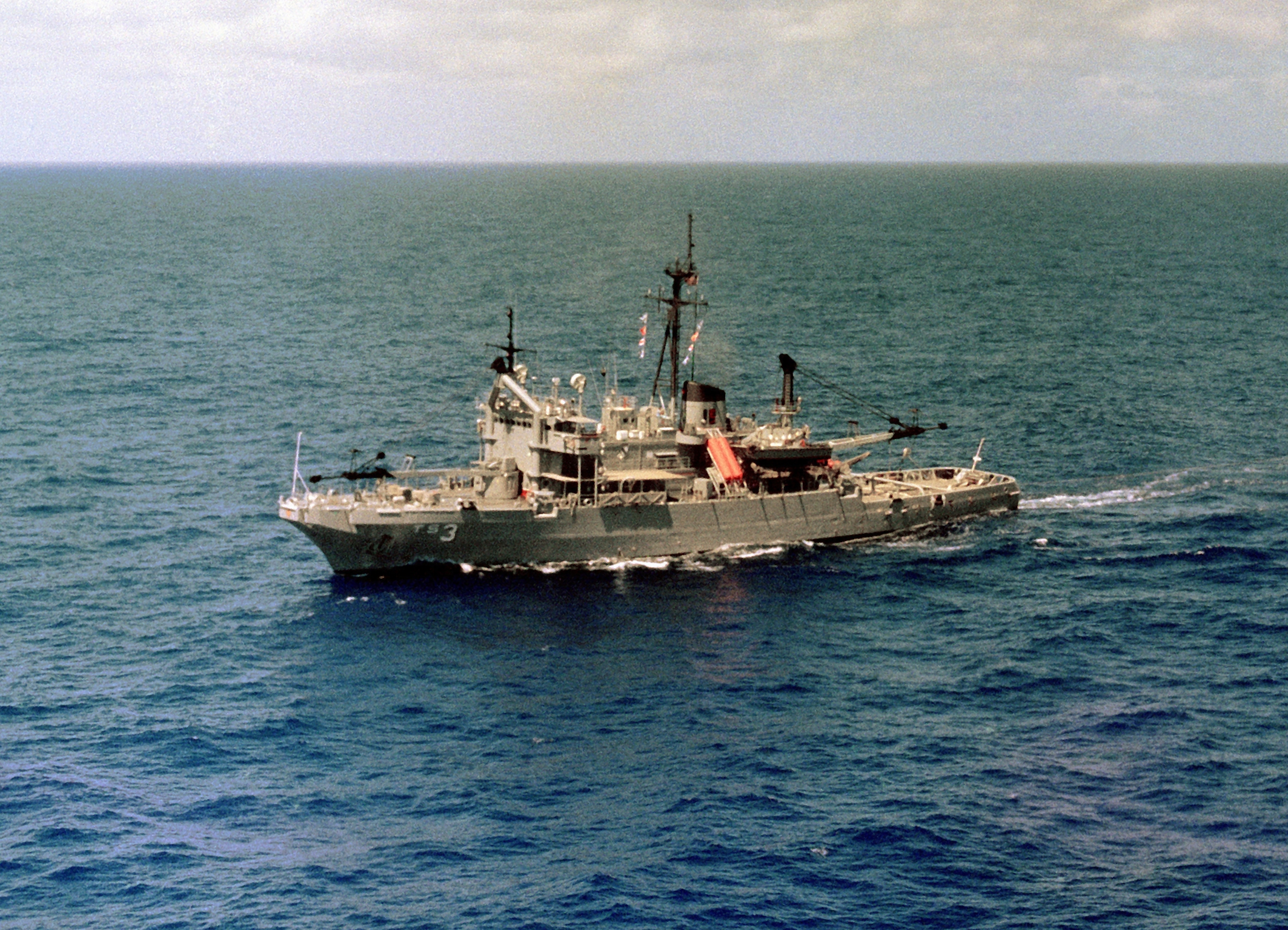
- USS Brunswick (ATS-3) in 1986

History

United States
- Name: USS Brunswick (ATS-3)
- Namesake: Brunswick, Georgia
- Ordered: 26 September 1967
- Builder: Brooke Marine
- Laid down: 27 May 1968
- Launched: 14 October 1969
- Commissioned: 19 December 1972
- Decommissioned: 8 March 1996
- Stricken: 12 December 1996
- Fate: Transferred to South Korea on 29 August 1996, scrapped 2016

General characteristics
- Class & type: Edenton-class salvage and rescue ship
- Displacement: 2,592 tons light; 3,063 tons full load
- Length: 283 feet (86 m)
- Beam: 59 feet (18 m)
- Draft: 17 ft (5.2 m), 18 ft (5.5 m)max
- Speed: 17 knots
- Complement: 106
- Armament: two 20 mm, four 0.5 in (12.7 mm)

USS Brunswick (ATS-3) was an Edenton-class salvage and rescue ship in the service of the United States Navy from 1972 until 1996. She was then transferred to South Korea and scrapped in 2016.

== Construction and commissioning ==
The third USS Brunswick, she was laid down on 27 May 1968 at Lowestoft, England by Brooke Marine Ltd.; launched on 14 October 1969; sponsored by the wife of Vice Admiral David C. Richardson, USN (Ret.); delivered to the Navy at the Norfolk Naval Shipyard on 21 November 1972; and commissioned there on 19 December 1972.

Brunswick finished out 1972 and began 1973 fitting out at Norfolk. On 13 March 1973, she got underway for the Pacific Ocean. Along the way she visited Brunswick, Georgia and Montego Bay, Jamaica. She transited the Panama Canal on 29 March and, after visits to Acapulco and a visit to Davy Jones Locker for Shellback duties off the coast of Costa Rica. The same day the captain designated the fantail not part of a US Navy ship, so all the off duty personnel were able to have a couple of beers. Then went to San Francisco, arrived in Pearl Harbor on 31 May. She conducted shakedown training during the month of July and, early in August, passed final contractor's trials. On 11 September, she began a three-month post-shakedown availability followed by a restricted availability at the Dillingham Shipyard. Brunswick completed repairs on 31 January 1974 and began normal operations in the Hawaiian Islands.

== Operational history ==
On 22 June she embarked upon her first deployment to the western Pacific. The ship arrived in Sasebo, Japan on 8 July. On the 10th, she got underway for salvage training near Chinhae, Korea. Sixteen days later, she completed that mission and shaped a course—via Subic Bay for fuel—to Singapore. The salvage tug arrived in Singapore on 6 August and remained there until the 30th, serving as standby salvage ship for a task force operating in the Indian Ocean. When Brunswick departed Singapore, she headed for the Malacca Strait where she rendezvoused with the task force leaving the Indian Ocean. After steaming with that unit for two days, the ship set off independently for Subic Bay. Between 8 and 11 September, she conducted salvage training in the Subic Bay operating area. Following that, she visited Hong Kong between 16 and 25 September. Brunswick returned to Subic Bay on the 28th and spent the next week engaged in target towing duty in the local operating area. She continued operations in the vicinity of Luzon until 22 November at which time she laid in a course for Oahu. Brunswick reentered Pearl Harbor on 6 December and commenced a leave and upkeep period that lasted through the end of the year and into 1975.

Standdown ended on 9 January when she put to sea to recover a downed helicopter near Maui. The salvage tug spent the last two weeks of January training in salvage operations near the island of Kauai. For the entire month of February, however, she remained in port at Pearl Harbor. Early in March, Brunswick returned to sea briefly for another round of training. Salvage training came at the end of the month. Late in April, the ship conducted surveillance operations on Soviet ships exercising nearby. Following a return to Pearl Harbor from 5 May to 2 June for upkeep, Brunswick resumed type training, salvage exercises, and diving drills out of Pearl Harbor. Such operations, as well as local tows, occupied the ship's time through the end of 1975 and for the first three months of 1976.

On 12 April 1976, she departed Pearl Harbor on her way to duty with the United States Seventh Fleet in the Far East. She stopped at Guam from 29 April to 7 May before continuing west to the Philippines. Brunswick entered Subic Bay on 15 May. She performed salvage missions and training duty in the Subic Bay area until late May. On 28 May, the ship stood out of Subic Bay for Taiwan. After a port visit at Kaohsiung from 30 May to 7 June, she continued on to Japan, arriving at Numazu on 12 June. She spent two days at Numazu conducting sea bottom surveys for amphibious landing mats before moving on to Yokosuka. Brunswick operated out of Yokosuka from 15 June to 2 August, conducting salvage operations in Suruga Wan. On the latter day, she shaped a course for Guam. The salvage tug arrived in Apra Harbor on 9 August and began a two-week availability.

On the 26th, she headed for Pearl Harbor. The ship entered her home port on 15 September but remained only a week. On 22 September, she embarked upon a voyage to the west coast of the United States. She arrived in San Francisco, California on the 28th and began preparations to tow the former USS Oriskany (CV-34) to Bremerton, Washington. She made the tow between 1 and 10 October and afterward made port visits to Bremerton and to Vancouver, British Columbia. She departed Vancouver for Oahu on 21 October and reentered Pearl Harbor on the 29th. Post-deployment leave and upkeep occupied the period from 30 October to 29 November. Two weeks of duty as standby salvage vessel in the Pearl Harbor area followed. On 13 December, Brunswick began a restricted availability that saw her through the end of the year.

The availability continued into 1977. She resumed normal operations on 17 January 1977 and continued so employed through the next three months. On 18 April, after 10 days of preparations in Pearl Harbor, the salvage tug embarked upon another voyage to the west coast of the United States. She arrived at Alameda, California on 25 April. On 3 May, Brunswick took the former USS Isle Royale (AD-29) in tow off Treasure Island and laid in a course for Hawaii. She pulled her charge into Pearl Harbor on 16 May and then resumed local operations. That occupation lasted until 1 July when she set off for Wake Island to salvage a Navy EC-130Q aircraft. The operation was completed on 18 August, and Brunswick returned to Pearl Harbor on the 26th. The ship spent the next month in port preparing for regular overhaul. On 26 September she entered drydock at the Dillingham Shipyard. Undocked on 14 November, the salvage tug moved to the Pearl Harbor Naval Shipyard to complete the overhaul.

Brunswick completed the repair period on 26 May 1978 but did not resume active service until 26 June. Salvage training, diver qualifications, and various general ship's drills constituted her activity until mid-October when she began preparing for another deployment to the western Pacific. She stood out of Pearl Harbor on the morning of 24 November and shaped a course westward. The first 17 days of December brought her surveillance duty in the Trust Territories of the Pacific Islands. On the 18th, Brunswick put into Apra Harbor, Guam, where she remained for the rest of 1978. She departed Guam for the Philippines on 3 January 1979. The salvage tug reached Subic Bay on the 8th and began a series of training evolutions out of that port. On 31 January, she steamed out of Subic Bay bound for Hong Kong. Her crew enjoyed a week of liberty in the British colony between 2 and 9 February before heading for a rendezvous with USS Davidson (FF-1045). The frigate had suffered an engineering casualty, and Brunswick took her in tow on 10 February. The salvage tug pulled Davidson into Subic Bay on 14 February, remained there for two days, and then got underway for Japan on the 16th.

Originally bound for Beppu, she was rerouted to Sasebo to pick up another tow. She took the barge in tow on 24 February and headed for Pohang, South Korea, and another salvage operation, which took up the period from 26 February to 7 March. Following that, she visited Chinhae and Pusan before returning to Subic Bay on the 24th. She remained only until the 26th when she departed the Philippines for a port visit to Kaohsiung, Taiwan. That visit was significant in that the United States had recently severed diplomatic ties with that country to establish relations with the Peking government. Brunswick was one of the first Navy ships to visit Taiwan since the rupture. Serving as a diplomatic barometer, she recorded fair weather as the Taiwanese greeted her and her crew warmly during the six-day call. On 2 April, Brunswick stood out of Kaohsiung and set course for Singapore. After three days at sea, she rendezvoused with USS Downes (FF-1070) and embarked 29 Vietnamese refugees whom the frigate had rescued at sea. The salvage tug arrived in Singapore on 7 April and disembarked the refugees. She stayed at Singapore for almost two weeks, heading back to Subic Bay on the 20th. The ship stopped at Subic Bay from 26 to 29 April and then began the voyage to Pearl Harbor with YC-1542 and YC-6568 in tow. She stopped at Guam and picked up an additional tow, USS Tuscumbia (YTB-762), at Midway Island before arriving back in Pearl Harbor on the afternoon of 24 May.

Following the usual post-deployment leave and upkeep period, Brunswick resumed normal operations out of Pearl Harbor in late June. For the next year, the salvage tug conducted training operations in the Hawaiian Islands and underwent the usual series of inspections and evaluations. Most frequently, she engaged in salvage training and diver qualifications and evaluations. On occasion, however, she towed targets for gunnery drills, served as a training platform for junior officer ship handling exercises, and conducted independent ship's drills. Early in June 1980, Brunswick began preparations to deploy to the western Pacific. On 21 June, the ship put to sea bound for the Philippines. On 4 July 1980, the salvage tug arrived in Apra Harbor, Guam, for what was to have been a short provisioning and fueling stop. A salvage and scuttling mission, however, kept her at Guam for over seven weeks. She finally resumed her voyage west on 25 August. Her first port of call was Hong Kong where she remained for the first 10 days in September. From there, she moved to Singapore, arriving on 15 September.

On 1 October, Brunswick shaped a course for the Philippines. On 3 October, she rescued 27 Vietnamese refugees on the high seas and brought them into Subic Bay with her on the 6th. On 20 October, the ship departed Subic Bay for Korea. She arrived in Chinhae on 26 October and spent the next two weeks engaged in training exercises with divers of the Republic of Korea Navy. She departed Chinhae on 9 October bound for Japan. After port visits to Sasebo, Numazu, and Yokosuka, Brunswick got underway from the latter port on 27 November and laid in a course for Hawaii. The salvage tug arrived in Pearl Harbor on 8 December and began the usual post-deployment leave and upkeep period.

The year 1981 opened with Brunswick still engaged in post-deployment and holiday standdown. She got underway again on 14 January 1981 for target towing duty. Her return to normal duty in the Hawaiian Islands lasted until 13 April when she began a two-month availability at pierside in Pearl Harbor. She completed repairs on 12 June and got underway to resume local operations on the 16th. That employment continued through September and into October. On 5 October the ship departed Pearl Harbor bound for the west coast with two floating drydocks (YRDMs) in tow. She arrived in San Francisco on 14 October and remained there until the 18th. She made port visits to Long Beach and San Diego before departing the latter port on 28 October to return to Oahu. Brunswick reentered Pearl Harbor on 4 November. For a month, the salvage tug took up local operations again. On 4 December 1981 she began preparations for overseas movement.

== Decommissioning ==
Brunswick was decommissioned on 8 March 1996. On 29 August 1996 she was transferred to South Korea through the Security Assistance Program. She was struck from the Naval Vessel Register on 12 December 1996, and became ATS-28 Gwangyang. In April 2010, Gwangyang participated in the salvage of the ROKS Cheonan (PCC-772). She was scrapped in 2016.
