= ROKS Gwangyang (ATS-32) =

Tongyeong-class salvage and rescue ship

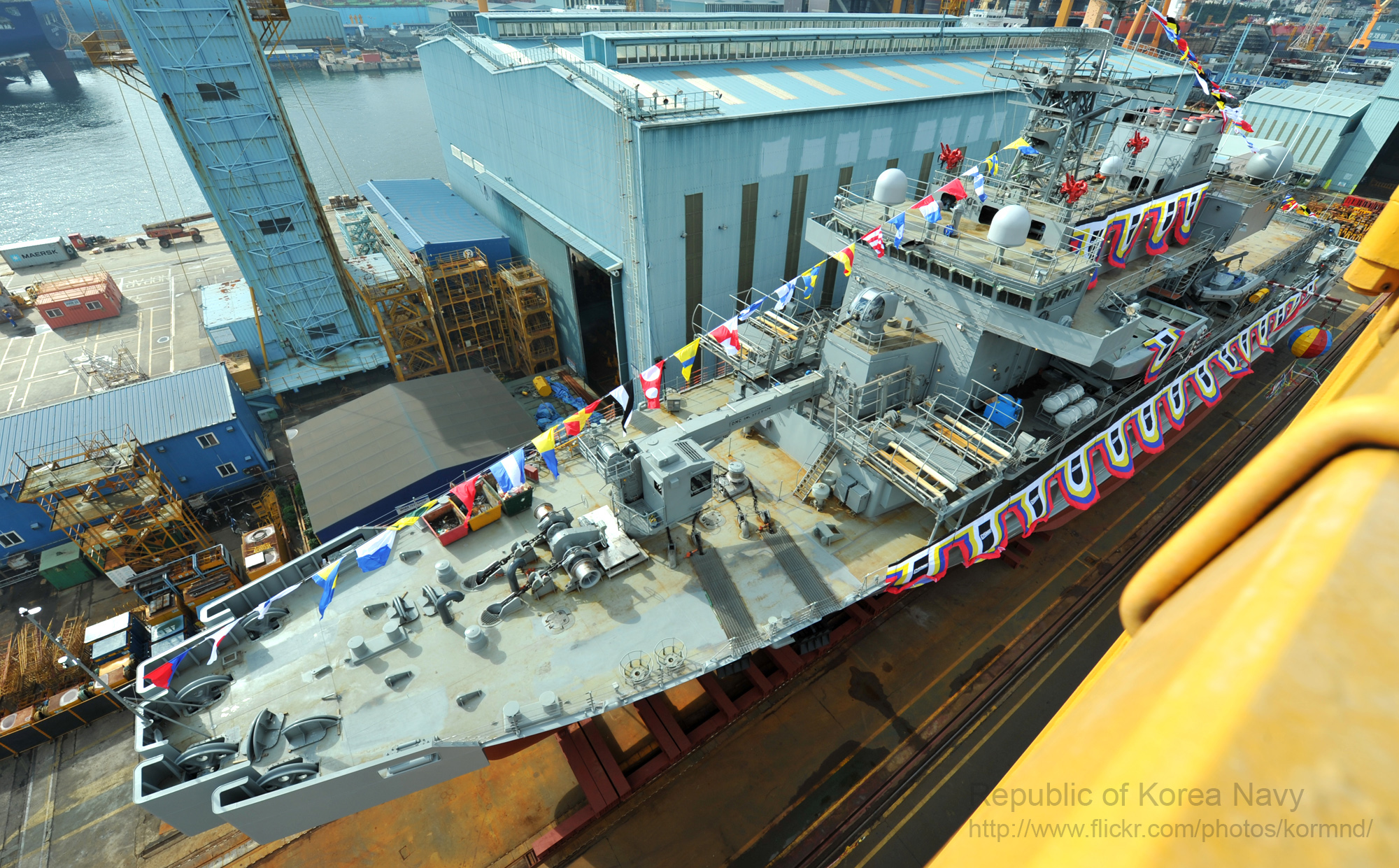
- ROKS Gwangyang on 4 September 2012

History

South Korea
- Name: Gwangyang; (광양)
- Namesake: Gwangyang
- Builder: Hanjin
- Launched: 30 June 2015
- Commissioned: 10 October 2016
- Identification: Callsign: HLEQ; Pennant number: ATS-32
- Status: Active

General characteristics
- Class & type: Tongyeong-class salvage and rescue ship
- Displacement: 3,500 tonnes (3,445 long tons)
- Length: 107.54 m (352 ft 10 in)
- Beam: 16.8 m (55 ft 1 in)
- Speed: 21 knots (39 km/h; 24 mph)
- Sensors & processing systems: Sonar
- Armament: 1 × M61 Vulcan
- Aviation facilities: Helipad

ROKS Gwangyang (ATS-32) is the second ship of the Tongyeong-class salvage and rescue ship in the Republic of Korea Navy. She is named after the city, Gwangyang.

== Design ==
The Tongyeong-class has a total tonnage of 3500 tons and a length of 107.5m with a width of 16.8m. Their maximum speed is up to 21 knots (about 39 km/h).

- Decompression chamber: 2 decompression chambers capable of accommodating up to 8 people (including surgeons) so that divers (SSUs) can perform rescue missions at a depth of 90m.
- Flight deck for take-off and landing of medium-sized helicopters.
- Equipped with automatic ship retaining device (thrust, propeller) on the bow and stern, it can rotate 360 degrees in place.
- ROV mounted - ROV, which was not present in the old Pyeongtaek-class salvage and rescue ships, was installed. It was decided to mount the same model, the Celling Robotics HD ROV, on the Gwangyang. The ROV of the Tongyeong is capable of operating up to 3 km below the sea floor, which is too deep for humans to bear, and is equipped with two robot arms, nine cameras, and a cutter. It weighs 3.5 tons, has a maximum speed of 3 knots, and has a lifting capacity of about 250 kg.
- 90 m divers support equipment - The air hose allows divers to perform long-term rescue operations at 90 m underwater.
- Crane - The 570-ton Yoon Youngha-class patrol vessels can be lifted with a crane.
- Towing - Ability to tow a Dokdo-class amphibious assault ship.
- Sonar: A fish finder was installed due to corruption in the defense industry.

== Construction and career ==
ROKS Gwangyang was launched on 30 June 2015 by Hanjin Heavy Industries and commissioned on 10 October 2016.

== Gallery ==
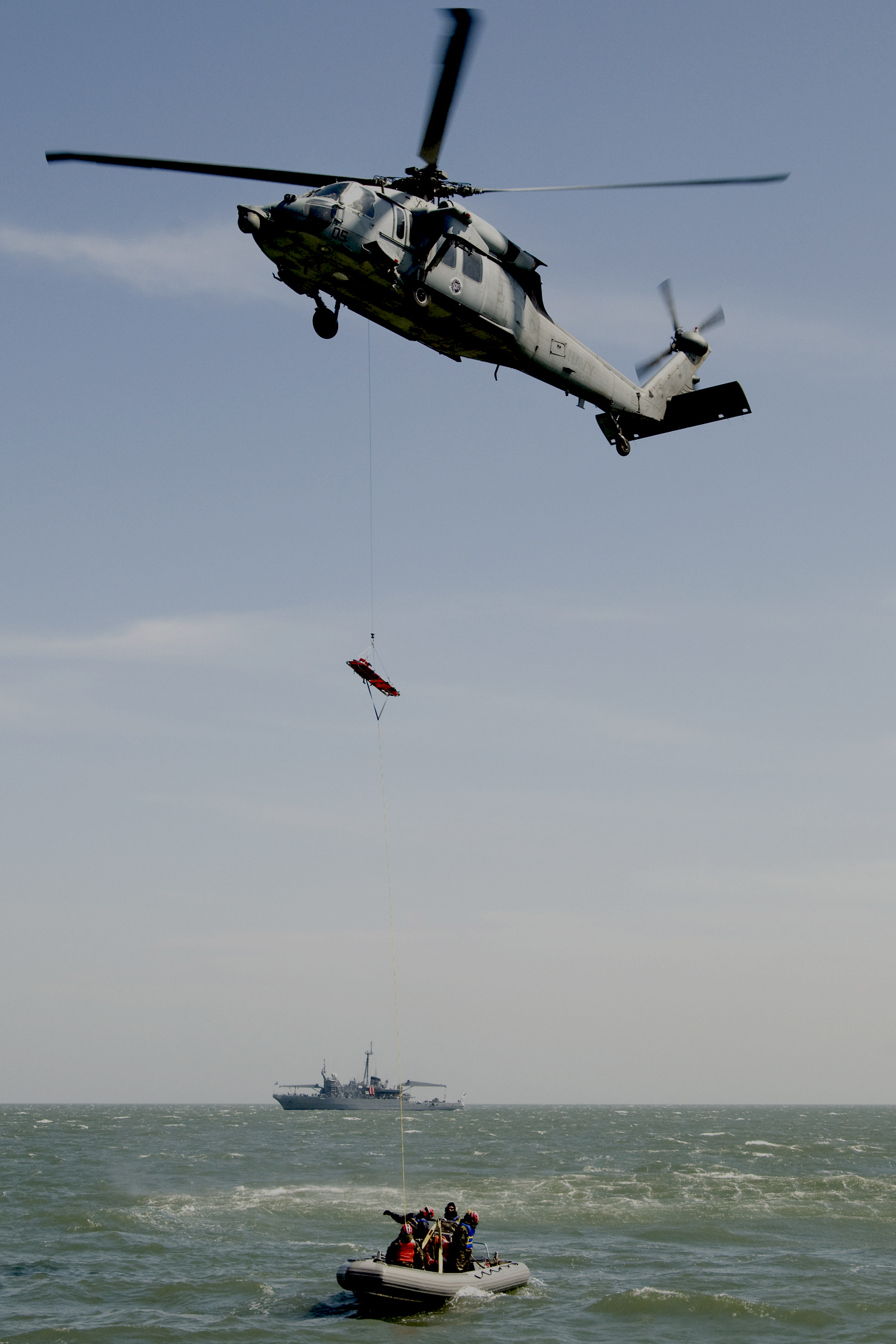
ROKS Gwangyang (ATS-28) on 6 April 2010

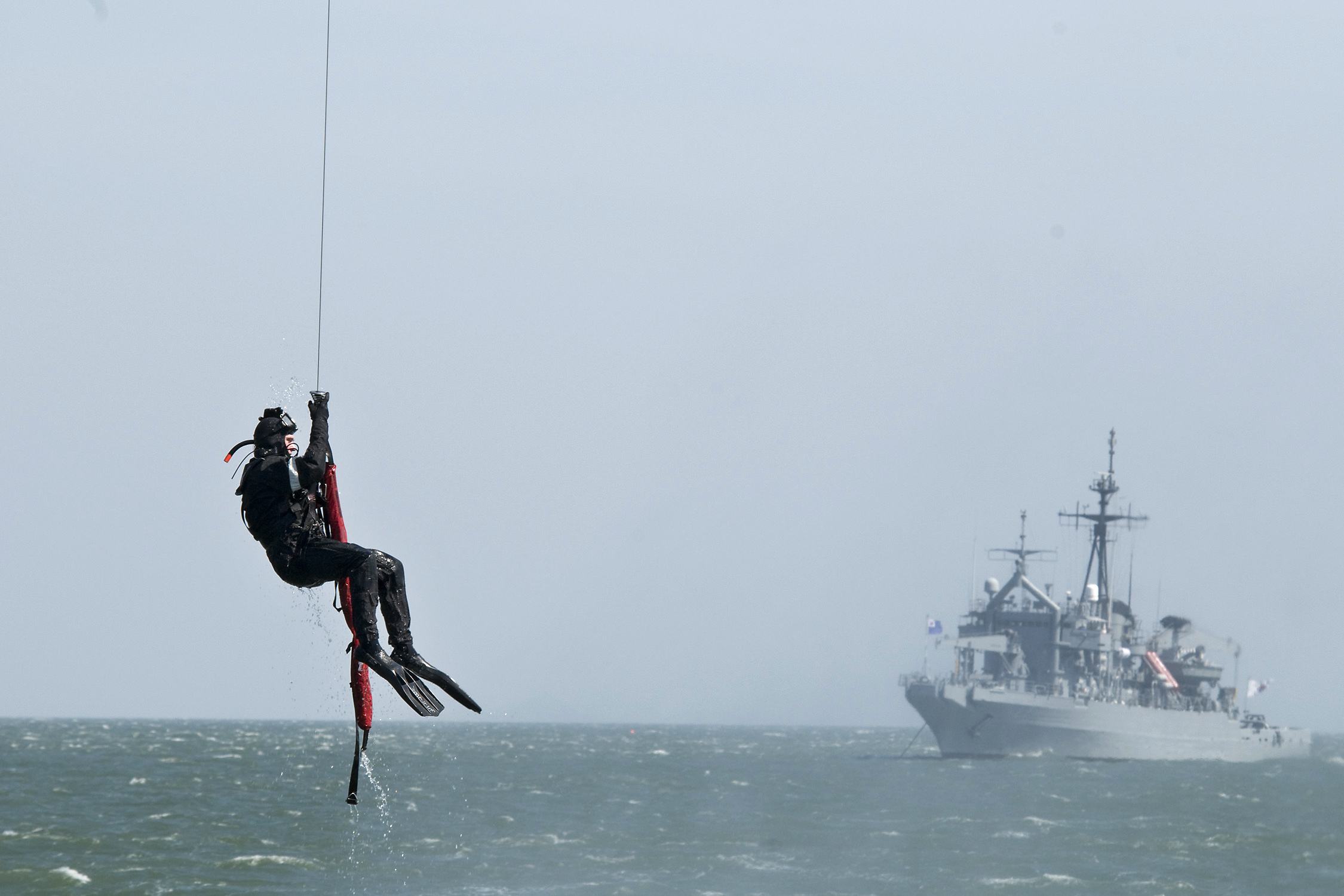

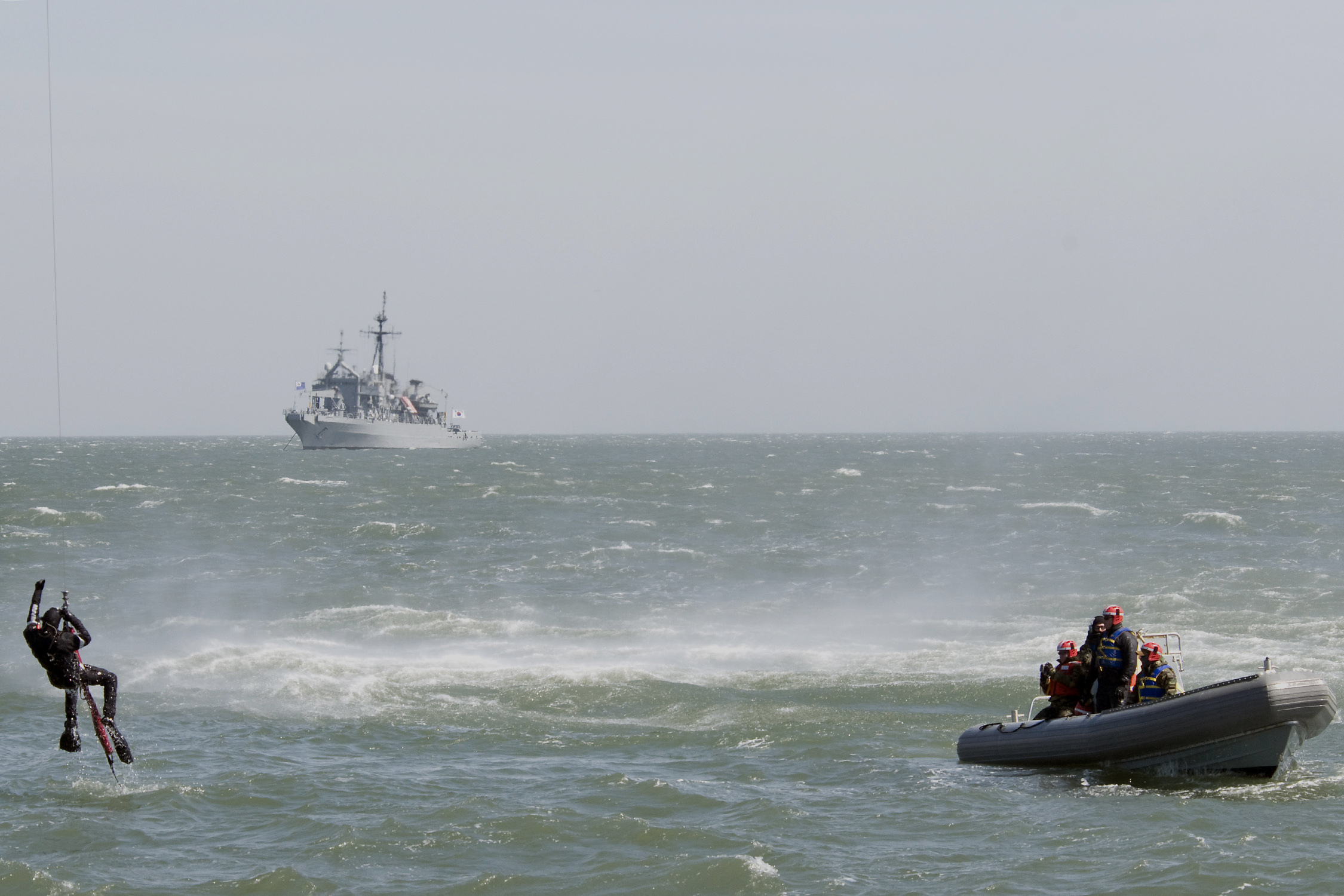
