= Edenton-class salvage and rescue ship =

Class of salvage and rescue ships of the United States Navy

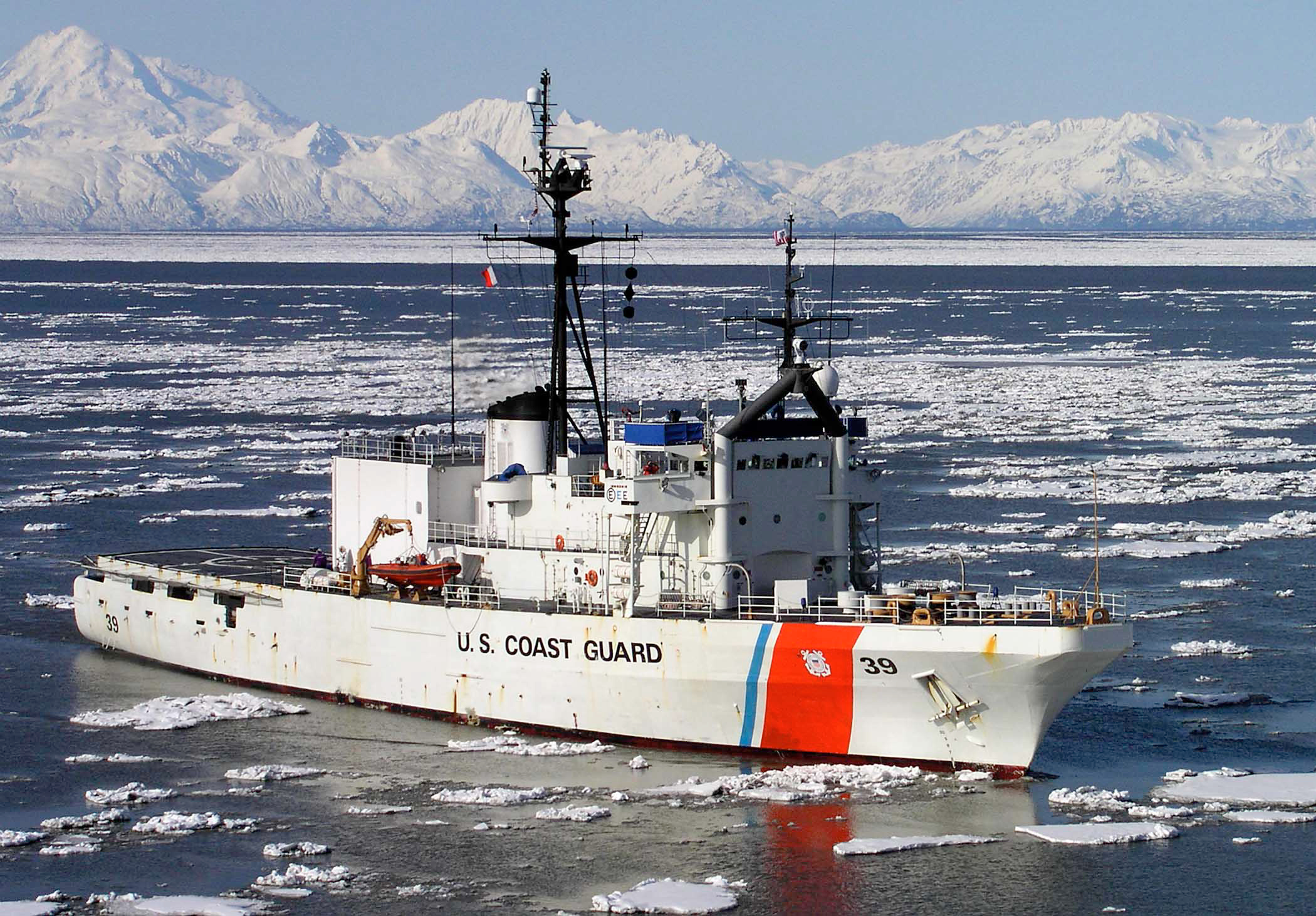
- USCGC Alex Haley

Class overview
- Name: Edenton class
- Builders: Brooke Marine
- Operators: United States Navy; United States Coast Guard; Republic of Korea Navy
- Succeeded by: Navajo class
- Built: 1967-1972
- In commission: 1971-present
- Planned: 3
- Completed: 3
- Active: 1
- Retired: 2

General characteristics
- Type: Salvage and rescue ship
- Displacement: 2,592 t (2,551 long tons), light; 3,484 t (3,429 long tons), full load
- Length: 283 ft (86 m)
- Beam: 59 ft (18 m)
- Draft: 17 ft (5.2 m), 18 ft (5.5 m)max
- Installed power: 6,800 shp (5,100 kW)
- Propulsion: 4 × Caterpillar diesel engines, 2 × shafts
- Speed: 18 knots (33 km/h; 21 mph)
- Range: 8,689 nmi (16,092 km; 9,999 mi)
- Complement: 10 officers, 90 enlisted
- Sensors & processing systems: AN/SPS-40 air-search radar (Edenton)
- Armament: 2 × M242 Bushmaster guns, 2 × 0.5 in (12.7 mm) guns
- Aviation facilities: Helipad (Edenton)

The Edenton-class salvage and rescue ship was a class of salvage and rescue ships that were operated by the United States Navy during the 1970s.

== Design ==
Edenton-class was a ship class consisting of three purpose built rescue ships, where they were brought into service in the 1970s. This class of ships were succeeded by the Navajo-class, as the designation ATS-4 and 5 were not used.

The ships were armed with two M242 Bushmaster 25-mm automatic cannons and two M2 Browning machine guns for self-defense.

== Ships in the class ==
Edenton class
Hull no.	Name	Callsign	Builder	Laid Down	Launched	Commissioned	Decommissioned	Fate
ATS-1	Edenton	NXSF	Brooke Marine	28 March 1967	15 May 1968	23 January 1971	29 March 1996	Transferred to the Coast Guard as USCGC Alex Haley (WMEC-39), 1999
ATS-2	Beaufort	NUOT	Brooke Marine	19 February 1968	1 December 1968	22 January 1972	8 March 1996	Sold to South Korea and renamed ROKS Pyeongtaek (ATS-27), 1997
ATS-3	Brunswick	NRCN	Brooke Marine	5 June 1968	14 October 1969	19 December 1972	8 March 1996	Sold to South Korea and renamed ROKS Gwangyang (ATS-28), 1997

== See also ==
- Salvage and rescue ship
- List of ships of the Republic of Korea Navy
- Brooke Marine
