= USS Tensaw =

Tugboat of the United States Navy

History

United States
- Name: Tensaw
- Namesake: A variant form of the name Tensas, a term derived from the Louisiana Native American tribe Taensa
- Ordered: as YT-418
- Builder: United States Coast Guard Yard, Curtis Bay, Maryland
- Laid down: 8 August 1944
- Launched: 11 October 1944
- Sponsored by: Mrs. Albert G. Mariner, Jr.
- In service: 8 March 1945
- Out of service: July 1967
- Reclassified: medium harbor tug – YTM – 1 February 1962
- Stricken: July 1967
- Honors and awards: data not available
- Fate: Disposed of in support of fleet training exercises, 1 February 1987

General characteristics
- Type: Sassaba-class district harbor tug
- Displacement: 260 long tons
- Length: 100 ft (30 m)
- Beam: 25 ft (7.6 m)
- Draft: 9 ft 7 in (2.92 m)
- Speed: 12 knots
- Complement: crew of 10
- Armament: two .50-cal machine guns

USS Tensaw (YT-418/YTB-418/YTM-418) was a Sassaba-class district harbor tug that served the United States Navy at the end of World War II. She remained in the Pacific Ocean to support the U.S. Pacific Fleet during the Korean War, and continued to serve until she was struck in 1967.

== Built by the Coast Guard in Maryland ==
Tensaw (YTB-418) ex-YT-418, was laid down on 8 August 1944 at the United States Coast Guard Yard, Curtis Bay, Maryland; launched on 11 October 1944; sponsored by Mrs. Albert G. Mariner Jr.; and placed in service on 8 March 1945.

== World War II-related service ==
Late that month, the new large harbor tug reported to the Commandant of the 5th Naval District at Norfolk, Virginia. In April, she proceeded via the Panama Canal to the Pacific Ocean and arrived at Pearl Harbor, Hawaii, on 14 May to begin duties in support of the U.S. Pacific Fleet.

In June 1945, she steamed, via the Marshall Islands, to the Mariana Islands where she operated through the end of World War II. After Japan capitulated, the tug continued to serve in the Marianas until the Korean War sent her, via the Philippine Islands, to Japan.

== Korean War support ==
Arriving at Yokosuka, Japan, on 7 February 1951, she supported United Nations Command forces through the signing of the Korean Armistice Agreement in the summer of 1953. After the Korean War she continued in the western Pacific through the 1950s and into the 1960s.

== Final disposition ==
Redesignated a medium harbor tug (YTM) on 1 February 1962, she remained with the Pacific Fleet until July 1967 when she was inactivated, and her name was struck from the Navy List. The tug was initially slated for disposal by sale but was instead sunk as a target during fleet training exercises, 1 February 1987.
