= Tuscumbia (YTB-762) =

Tugboat of the United States Navy

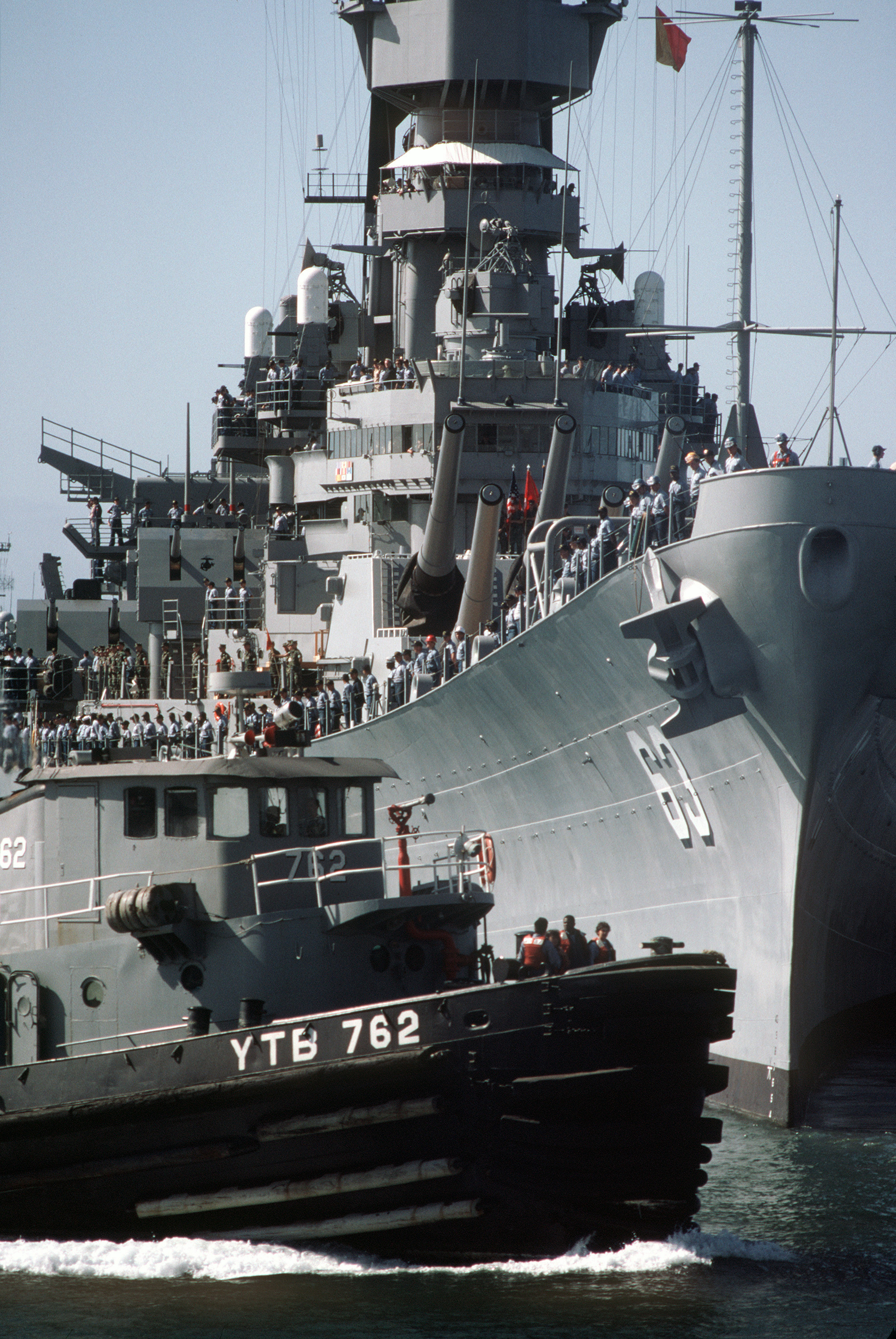
- Tuscumbia (YTB-762) assists USS Missouri (BB-63)

History

United States
- Namesake: Tuscumbia, Alabama
- Awarded: 14 October 1960
- Builder: Commercial Iron Works, Portland, Oregon
- Laid down: 16 February 1961
- Launched: 22 August 1961
- In service: December 1961
- Out of service: date unknown
- Stricken: Date unknown
- Homeport: San Diego, California; Pearl Harbor, Hawaii
- Fate: not known

General characteristics
- Class & type: Natick-class large harbor tug
- Displacement: 283 long tons (288 t) (light); 356 long tons (362 t) (full)
- Length: 109 feet (33 m)
- Beam: 31 feet (9.4 m)
- Draft: 14 feet (4.3 m)
- Propulsion: Fairbanks Morse Diesel
- Speed: 12 knots (14 mph; 22 km/h)
- Complement: 12
- Armament: not known

Tuscumbia (YTB-762) was a United States Navy Natick-class large harbor tug. The second ship to bear the name, Tuscumbia was named for the town of Tuscumbia, Alabama, which had been named for a Cherokee chief.

== Construction ==
The contract for Tuscumbia was awarded 14 October 1960. She was laid down on 16 February 1961 at Slidell, Louisiana by Southern Shipbuilding Corporation 22 August 1961.

== Operational history ==
Tuscumbia served in the Pacific Ocean, initially at San Diego, California, attached to the 11th Naval District, until shifted to Pearl Harbor, Hawaii, to operate in the 14th Naval District providing the necessary tug and tow services to support the U.S. Pacific Fleet from 1963 to and into 1978.

Tuscumbia is clearly visible in the closing scenes of the movie Down Periscope released in March 1996. According to IMDB, most of the harbor footage was shot in San Francisco, so there is a visual record of her in that location at that time.

Stricken from the Navy List, date unknown though likely sometime in 1995, ex-Tuscumbia was transferred to the Maritime Administration 11 September 1995. At some point, Atoll Institute was in negotiation with MARAD to acquire ex-Tuscumbia for conversion to R/V PERL.
