= CFS Shelburne =

Former Canadian Forces Station in Nova Scotia

Canadian Forces Station Shelburne probably 1980s with permanent buildings

Canadian Forces Station (CFS) Shelburne is a former Canadian Forces Station that was a shore terminus for the Sound Surveillance System (SOSUS) from 1955 to 1994. It was located in the Municipality of the District of Shelburne, Shelburne County, Nova Scotia.

The system, its name and purpose of the shore stations, in which output of the array at sea was processed and displayed by means of the Low Frequency Analyzer and Recorder (LOFAR), was classified until 1991 with "oceanographic research" given as the cover for the actual purpose of undersea surveillance. The shore stations were given the generic and vague name of Naval Facility (NAVFAC). The Canadian facilities were officially given other names reflecting joint Canadian forces and United States Navy operation but within U.S. Navy terminology may sometimes be seen as Naval Facility (NAVFAC) Shelburne and Naval Facility (NAVFAC) Argentia, the other Canadian Atlantic SOSUS shore terminal.

The SOSUS facility opened in 1955 during the Cold War adjacent to and including a part of what had been a World War II installation, HMCS Shelburne. That original installation was located on the eastern shore of Shelburne Harbour in the community of Sandy Point, immediately south of the boundary for the town of Shelburne and included a deepwater port and shore facilities including barracks and residences. That installation closed in 1946 becoming an industrial park.

The Cold War SOSUS shore terminal included some of the old installation and land located in the community of Lower Sandy Point, approximately 14 km (8.7 mi) south of the town of Shelburne, on Government Point at the southern tip of a peninsula separating Shelburne Harbour from Jordan Bay.

The Shelburne facility was one of the first phase SOSUS systems. The original order for six Atlantic systems in 1952 was expanded in 1954 to three more Atlantic systems for a total of nine and six more on the Pacific coast of the United States with one in Hawaii. A prototype array at Eleuthera, Bahamas had been joined by operational Naval Facilities at Ramey Air Force Base, Puerto Rico, Grand Turk, and San Salvador, Bahamas in 1954. The 1955 installations included Shelburne and Naval Facilities Bermuda, Nantucket and at Cape May, New Jersey. (Note: Naval Facility Cape May was damaged and at risk of flooding after a major storm in 1961. The array was re-terminated at a new facility, Naval Facility Lewes, at Fort Miles near Lewes, Delaware.) When decommissioned August 1, 1994, it was the oldest facility as the other original and later individual shore facilities had been consolidated or shut down.

The closed facility was put to civilian use in 1995.

== World War II bases (1941–1944) ==
=== HMCS Shelburne (1941–1946) ===
43.7430°N 65.3137°W

In December 1941 the Royal Canadian Navy opened a naval station in the community of Sandy Point named HMCS Shelburne on the eastern shore of Shelburne Harbour immediately south of the town of Shelburne. Located at the mouth of the Roseway River, this station consisted of a deepwater pier and associated shore facilities, including barracks and residences. It was connected by Canadian National Railways via a short spur from the government wharf spur off its Yarmouth to Halifax main line.

On May 13, 1945, the commanding officer of U-889, Kapitänleutnant Friedrich Braeucker formally surrendered to the RCN at HMCS Shelburne after being escorted there from Bay Bulls, Newfoundland, on May 10 by HMCS Buckingham and HMCS Inch Arran. On May 14 U-889 was taken by the RCN to Halifax.

HMCS Shelburne was closed in 1946 as part of the RCN's post–World War II budget cuts and force draw-down. The facility was converted into an industrial park with buildings sold for private use.

Approximately 200 acres (0.81 km^{2}) of the Sandy Point property was purchased by the Government of Nova Scotia in 1948 for construction of the "Nova Scotia School for Boys" – a modern penal facility to replace the "Halifax Industrial School for Boys", a penal facility that had closed in 1947. The Nova Scotia School for Boys (later called the Shelburne Youth Centre) would close in 1988 upon the opening of the Nova Scotia Youth Centre in Waterville, NS.

=== RCAF Station Shelburne (1942–1944) ===
Throughout the winter of 1942 during the months following the Attack on Pearl Harbor, the Royal Canadian Air Force constructed a seaplane base in Sandy Point, immediately south of HMCS Shelburne.

It was intended for operational use by the United States Navy for conducting anti-submarine patrols off southern Nova Scotia for the shipping lanes to Boston and the Gulf of Maine as part of the Battle of the Atlantic. The USN decided against using the facility prior to its completion, thus it was commissioned as RCAF Station Shelburne and opened in June 1942 as a training base that saw occasional operational use.

RCAF Station Shelburne hosted the No. 3 Operational Training Unit using the PBY-5A Canso with No. 116 Squadron RCAF being the first to train at the facility. In June 1943 No. 116 Squadron deployed to RCAF Station Botwood. Throughout the rest of 1943 the station was used occasionally by No. 117 Squadron RCAF and the No. 6 Coast Artillery Co-operation Detachment. In March 1944 the station was taken over by the Royal Canadian Navy and consolidated into the adjacent HMCS Shelburne.

== SOSUS (1955–1994) ==
The creation of NATO in 1949 coincided with the development of SOSUS by the United States Navy and later other NATO navies for monitoring submarines of Warsaw Pact navies. The research and development phase of SOSUS ended with success and it began to be operationally deployed in 1952, beginning with the creation of 6 arrays in the North Atlantic basin. The concept and rapid deployment of the system grew out of the World War II anti-submarine experience and the danger of snorkeling submarines. Research and development 1949 through 1950 showed passive sonar exploiting low frequencies and the deep sound channel could be effective for long range acoustic detection. The first phase stations were experimental to prove the concept but quickly became operational in tests with U.S. submarines. On June 26, 1962, Naval Facility Cape Hatteras detected the first Soviet diesel submarine.

The advent of nuclear submarines and strategic missile submarines made the system even more critical. On July 6, 1962, Naval Facility Barbados proved the system effective against nuclear submarines when it detected a Soviet nuclear submarine off Norway transiting the Greenland-Iceland-United Kingdom (GIUK) gap. CFS Shelburne remained operational into the era in which mobile towed arrays joined the fixed bottom SOSUS arrays and the renaming of SOSUS to the Integrated Undersea Surveillance System (IUSS) in 1985 and one of the few such individual array terminals remaining when the purpose was declassified in 1991.

=== HMCS Shelburne (1955–1968) ===
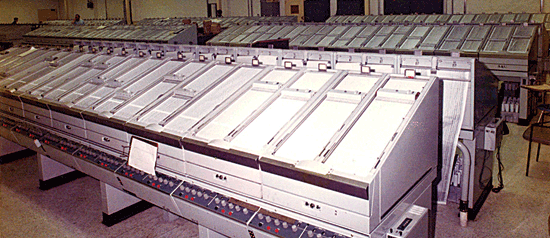
LOFARgram writers on a NAVFAC watch floor

Each array required a shore-based facility to be constructed, which the USN termed a "Naval Facility" (NAVFAC). The first NAVFAC built under the "Caesar Program" was commissioned in September 1954 at Ramey Air Force Base, Puerto Rico. Similar stations were established that year at Grand Turk Island (Turks and Caicos) and San Salvador Island (Bahamas).

One of the original six SOSUS arrays in the Atlantic basin was deployed off Nova Scotia and northern New England, requiring a NAVFAC to be constructed in southern Nova Scotia. As a result, the RCN reactivated HMCS Shelburne as a lodger unit on April 1, 1955.

The RCN reacquired 23 of its former buildings in the industrial park at the original HMCS Shelburne in Sandy Point and constructed several new buildings including residences. Additionally, a new property was acquired 14 km (8.7 mi) to the south in Lower Sandy Point on a headland named Government Point. where Facility was constructed and commissioned as "Joint RCN/USN Oceanographic Research Station" using the cover description for what would become the first SOSUS station in Canada.

HMCS Shelburne became operational on April 1, 1955, with the commanding officer of HMCS Shelburne being appointed the officer-in-charge of the Oceanographic Research Station (aka the NAVFAC). (Note: Commander, Undersea Surveillance web page has 1 April 1955 as commissioning date. Photographs of the commissioning on the IUSS/Caesar Alumni Association site have the actual ceremony date as 1 May 1955. A note on the photo Four of the "Original Five" WRENs at Shelburne 1955 (referenced below) that the fifth WREN, Lois, "was on watch" shows that the commissioning ceremony took place after operations began.) As such, HMCS Shelburne was also the first SOSUS station to not fall under direct command of the USN. The Canadian contingent included five women of the Women's Royal Canadian Naval Service preceding the 1972 assignment of women to SOSUS shore terminals in the U.S. Navy by seventeen years.

HMCS Shelburne would undergo numerous changes during the remainder of the 1950s and through the 1960s as the World War II–era quonset huts were replaced with modern facilities.

One of the most notable events involving HMCS Shelburne was a reported UFO crash on October 4, 1967, that was witnessed in the waters off Shag Harbour, Nova Scotia, a fishing community in western Shelburne County approximately 50 km (31 mi) southwest of the military facilities at Shelburne Harbour. What would come to be called the Shag Harbour UFO incident reportedly also involved a coordinated military operation by the RCN and USN in the waters off the Shelburne NAVFAC at Government Point in the days following this incident.

=== CFS Shelburne (1968–1995) ===
On February 1, 1968, the RCN merged with the RCAF and the Canadian Army to form the Canadian Armed Forces. As part of the unification, HMCS Shelburne was renamed to Canadian Forces Station Shelburne, or CFS Shelburne.

CFS Shelburne continued operations much as before, supporting the NAVFAC and the SOSUS array as part of IUSS; in fact CFS Shelburne was the smallest NAVFAC in the Atlantic basin. CFS Shelburne was placed under control of Maritime Command (MARCOM) which was the new name for naval forces in Canada. Operationally, CFS Shelburne was part of Maritime Forces Atlantic (MARLANT) which operated the Atlantic Fleet and associated support facilities.

The reunification of Germany and dissolution of the Soviet Union led to the end of the Cold War, resulting in numerous defense budget cutbacks in NATO nations, including Canada and the United States. This period also coincided with numerous technological changes that made remote operation of sensor systems such as SOSUS possible from further distances.

The IUSS underwent significant changes in 1994 when Commander Undersea Surveillance Atlantic and Pacific consolidated into a single command located in Dam Neck, Virginia, leading to remote operation of the SOSUS arrays and closure of associated NAVFACs.

In support of this process, the Canadian Forces established the Canadian Forces IUSS Centre or CFIC which was housed in a new lodger unit named HMCS Trinity located at CFB Halifax. CFIC was created to operate the two SOSUS arrays, one being the only curved array in the system, terminated at NAVFAC Shelburne (located at CFS Shelburne) and NAVFAC Argentia (located at Naval Station Argentia). NAVFAC Shelburne's monitoring operations for its SOSUS array was transferred to the CFIC/HMCS Trinity by remote operation in summer 1994 with NAVFAC Argentia following that fall.

On August 1, 1994, the NAVFAC at CFS Shelburne was disestablished with USN personnel departing. The station itself was decommissioned entirely as a military facility by the Canadian Forces on March 13, 1995. The last CF service member unofficially handed off the keys to main gate and all facility access keys March 31, 1995.

== Civilian use (1995–present) ==
After its decommissioning, the properties comprising the former CFS Shelburne were transferred by the Government of Canada to the Government of Nova Scotia which in turn transferred them to the Shelburne Park Development Agency, who operated them as Shelburne Park. In 1997, responding to plans of the Shelburne Park Development Agency to develop Shelburne Park as a land-based aquaculture park, Ocean Produce International Ltd. (OPI) purchased 8 acres of "Government Point" at the southern tip of the former CFS Shelburne from the Shelburne Park Development Agency. In May 1997, Ocean Produce International Ltd. constructed a land-based seaweed research and development facility for two dwarf seaweed mutations with a salt-water greenhouse, production and processing facilities, microbiology, wet and dry labs and refrigeration rooms as well as office facilities.

For the next ten years, OPI was involved in selling and winning culinary awards for their fresh and dried seaweed to culinary markets in Canada, the United States, Europe and Asia. OPI also developed raw materials for nutritional and cosmetics markets in North America. For its part, OPI also extracted a rare excitatory amino acid (kainic acid) and marketed it to some 300 neurological labs, universities and pharmaceutical companies in over 40 countries over the next decade. Shortly after the construction of OPI's facilities, the Shelburne Park Development Agency announced that it had abandoned its plans to develop the former base as a land-based aquaculture park adopting a plan to develop a sound stage instead.

Ocean Produce International Ltd. is today reviewing the potential for re-purposing and re-development of its 8-acre property at Government Point, which could include high volume saltwater wells and potential wind-turbines at the entrance to Shelburne Harbour and at the tip of the peninsula between the harbour and Jordan Bay.

The Shelburne Park Development Agency was made a subsidiary of the Shelburne Area Industrial Commission, which has since been merged with the Yarmouth Area Industrial Commission and Clare Area Industrial Commission to form the South West Shore Development Authority (SWSDA).

Shelburne Park is operated by SWSDA as a business park from the two former military facilities at Sandy Point and Lower Sandy Point. Several of the buildings at the Lower Sandy Point road location (the former NAVFAC) have been transformed into the Shelburne Film Production Centre, which opened on 9 July 2000. It was listed for sale by the SWSDA for $5 million and sold in 2008 to Seacoast Entertainment Arts Inc. for development as a film production studio.

In late November 2011, the facility was sold to Tri-County Construction, a marine construction contracting company, for $125,000, plus $48,442.58 in back taxes, as well as undisclosed sales taxes and a municipal deed transfer tax. Shortly after the purchase, the buyer said he had no immediate plans for the property.

Reportedly numerous buildings at the former NAVFAC sit in derelict condition open to the elements.
