= Naval Facility Centerville Beach =

Former U.S. military shore terminal

Coordinates: 40.564315°N 124.350642°W

Naval Facility Centerville Beach March 1958 – September 1993.

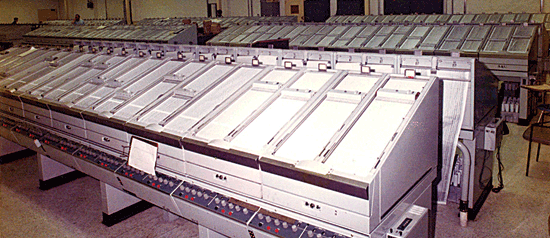
Lofargram writers on watch floor.

In 1958 Naval Facility (NAVFAC) Centerville Beach was the third Sound Surveillance System (SOSUS) shore terminal, in which output of the array at sea was processed and displayed by means of the Low Frequency Analyzer and Recorder (LOFAR), established on the Pacific coast. The previous year the last of the original Atlantic systems, Naval Facility Barbados, had become operational and the first of the Pacific systems had been installed at San Nicolas Island. Naval Facility Point Sur to the south had been commissioned on 8 January 1958. The SOSUS mission, as well as the name itself was classified until 1991. The facility was installed under the cover name Project Caesar and described as being engaged in "oceanographic research" with its actual role in undersea surveillance not revealed until two years before the facility closed.

NAVFAC Centerville Beach, formally commissioned on 25 March 1958, was located on 37 acres separated from the beach by a 320 ft (97.5 m) cliff. The original facility was 16 structures with a complement of about 95 that grew to 24 major structures with a complement of 280. The facility was near Centerville Beach. The closest town was Ferndale, California.

The facility was the first to be upgraded in September 1972 with a third generation coaxial cable, based on commercial developments at Bell Laboratories, designated SD-C. The new cable at Centerville, designated SD-C1 and the complete sea system officially designated AN/FQQ-11 (V), allowed a fourth generation of sonar sets, coupled with the new shore processing, was later retrofitted at other facilities.

Naval Facility Centerville Beach, which from 1978 to 1985 hosted the Readiness Training Facility, survived three earthquakes in 1992. Then its cables were re-terminated at Naval Ocean Processing Facility (NOPF), Whidbey Island. NAVFAC Centerville Beach was decommissioned on 30 September 1993.
