= Admiral Herbert =

Admiral Herbert may refer to:

- Arthur Herbert, 1st Earl of Torrington (c. 1648–1716), British Royal Navy admiral
- Gretchen S. Herbert (born 1962), U.S. Navy rear admiral
- Peter Herbert (Royal Navy officer) (1929–2019), British Royal Navy admiral
- Thomas Herbert (Royal Navy officer) (1793–1861), British Royal Navy vice admiral
- Thomas Herbert, 8th Earl of Pembroke (c. 1656–1733), Lord High Admiral of the United Kingdom
