= Naval Facility Nantucket =

Former naval facility

Naval Facility (NAVFAC) Nantucket
- Siasconset, Nantucket, Massachusetts
- NAVFAC Nantuckett ca. early 1960s after replacement of most Quonset buildings. Terminal building close to beach (center) in its own compound.

Site information
- Type: SOSUS shore terminus
- Controlled by: Commander, Oceanographic System Atlantic (COMOCEANSYSLANT)
- Open to the public: No (mission and purpose classified until 1991)

Location
- Coordinates: 41°14′28.31″N 70°0′25.32″W

Site history
- Built: 1954-1955
- Built by: United States Navy
- In use: 1955-1976

Garrison information
- Occupants: 8 officers, 89 enlisted; 10 officers, 94 enlisted by 1962

Naval Facility Nantucket Island or simply Naval Facility Nantucket (NAVFAC Nantucket) was a shore terminal of the Sound Surveillance System (SOSUS) active from 1955 to 1976. The true function of the system and the shore terminals, in which output of the array at sea was processed and displayed by means of the Low Frequency Analyzer and Recorder (LOFAR), was classified and the term "Naval Facility" was intentionally vague. Its function was described as oceanographic research.

The facility was built about twelve miles from the town of Nantucket on a part of a site that had been used in World War II as an ordnance site and practice bombing range. Locally the facility was sometimes known as the Tom Nevers Naval Facility for the area of Nantucket island where it stood. (Note: This was apparently the local name, predating the establishment of the SOSUS Naval Facility, applied to the leased ordnance site that was officially the Nantucket Ordnance Site.)

In 1980 the property was sold to the Town of Nantucket and is now a park managed by the Parks and Recreation Commission.

== History ==
Naval Facility (NAVFAC) Nantucket was among the first Atlantic systems ordered and installed with the shore facility commissioned 1 August 1955. The facility, along with the entire Atlantic system at the time, was experimental though it quickly became operational. The visible shore installations and obvious cable work done in connection with their construction required a cover story explaining them as oceanographic research facilities and that data gathered by oceanographic and acoustic surveys with ships could at times be collected "more expeditiously and more economically by means of shore stations. These are the U. S. Naval Facilities." The "oceanographic" cover included the entire span of the facility's existence and decommissioning on 30 June 1976 with the SOSUS mission being declassified in 1991.

The site, about twelve miles from the town of Nantucket on Tom Never's Head at the southernmost tip of the island, had been part of the Nantucket Ordnance Site. During World War II the land had been leased by the government from September 1943 through 30 June 1946 for use as the Nantucket Ordnance Site (also known as Tom Nevers Rocket Projectile Target), an aerial rocket range for pilots from the Quonset Naval Air Station.

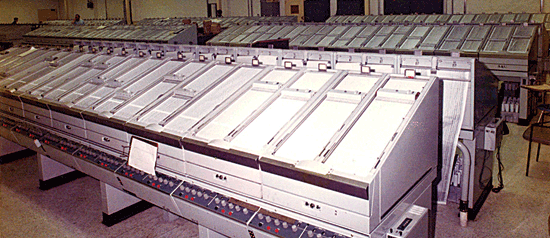
Lofargram writers on watch floor.

In 1958 the facility was still in Quonset huts housing both the sensitive electronic equipment and eight officers and eighty-nine enlisted men. Within five years the temporary buildings had deteriorated putting the terminal building electronics at risk. The complement had grown to ten officers and ninety-four enlisted men and new combination administration building and barracks was requested along with a mess hall and recreation facilities. It was evident that the classified details of the system and its shore terminal was not clear even to some high ranking Senators as the same request for replacement buildings was met by questions in the Senate Committee as to why it could not be moved to another location, including the Boston Navy Yard, and why its "oceanographic work" could not be done at Woods Hole. The Navy again requested funds in 1964 to upgrade facilities to permanent buildings. Fourteen units of family housing were authorized in 1967.

The surveillance system shore processing facilities underwent backfits during the late 1960s at the stations replacing original equipment with more modern equipment including moving from electromechanical spectrum analysis to digital.

A bomb shelter for President John F. Kennedy, to be used in the event of a nuclear attack while President Kennedy was in Hyannisport, was located under a mound built on the facility.

The first decommissioning of SOSUS shore stations came in 1976 when the first to be commissioned, Naval Facility Punta Borinquen (commissioned 18 September 1954 as NAVFAC Ramey), Puerto Rico, was closed on 30 April followed by Naval Facility Nantucket on 30 June.

== Return to civilian use ==
The Town of Nantucket purchased the property from the Navy in 1980 for US$525,000 (equivalent to $2,051,444 in 2025) with the intent it would be used as a recreation area. The approximately twenty-five acres included over 1,000 ft (304.8 m) of shoreline. Fifteen acres were transferred to the Nantucket Housing Authority and the Veterans of Foreign Wars (VFW) leased the recreation building and some three adjacent acres on which they sponsor an annual beach carnival. Many of the Navy buildings and some of the paved roads had been removed after decommissioning of the Naval Facility and the remaining stripped buildings were in poor condition. The Terminal Building was close to collapse onto the beach due to erosion and the VFW building was only 80 ft (24.4 m) from the point of erosion on the coastal bank.

The Nantucket Parks and Recreation Commission managed the property with the VFW managing its portion and holding public events there. The Nantucket Hunting Association obtained permission to use the bunker in 1995 but it was later used by Parks and Recreation as storage. By 2018 there was interest in restoring the bunker as a museum and attraction and there was some interest in obtaining objects that had been used in the West Palm Beach Kennedy bunker, which had closed, and associating with former management of that site.

As of 2020 the Town and County of Nantucket shows the Tom Nevers Park owned and managed by the Parks and Recreation Commission.

== Erosion ==
Beach erosion was a problem, clearly by 1969 and by closure was threatening the Terminal Building containing all the equipment. After closure the Terminal Building was in danger of toppling onto the beach and was eventually demolished.

== See also ==
- Naval Facility Bermuda
- Naval Facility Point Sur
- Wings (NBC TV series)
- List of military installations in Massachusetts
