= Gretchen S. Herbert =

US Navy admiral

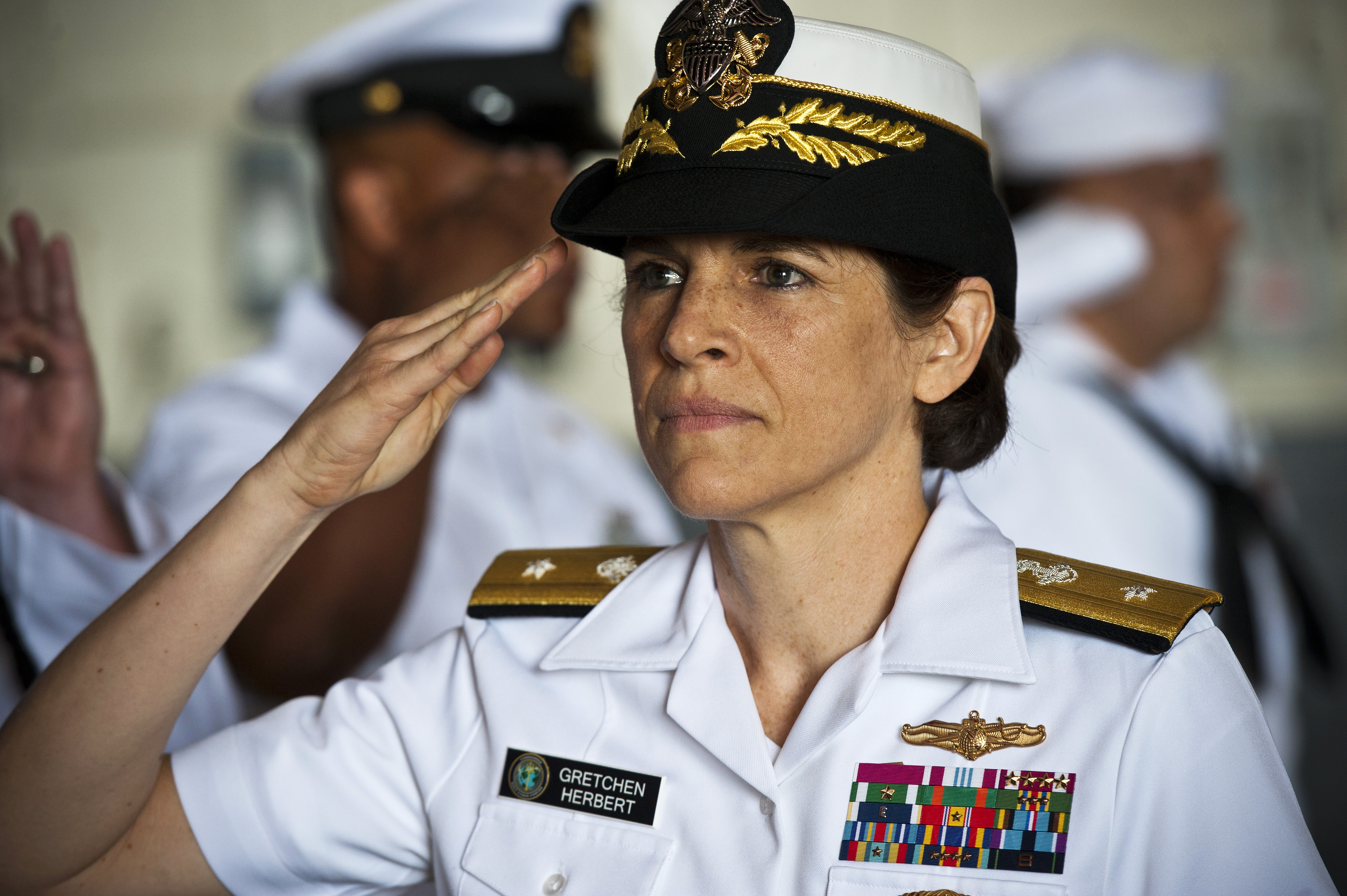
- RDML Gretchen S. Herbert, United States Navy
- Born: Gretchen Mary Specht; 1962 (age 63–64); Rochester, New York
- Military career
- Branch: United States Navy
- Service years: 1984–2014
- Rank: Rear admiral (RDML)

RDML Gretchen S. Herbert is a retired United States Navy officer who commanded the Navy Cyber Forces.

A native of Rochester, New York, Rear Admiral Herbert graduated from the University of Rochester in 1984, receiving her commission through the Naval Reserve Officers Training Corps program. She holds a master's degree in Systems Technology (Space Systems Operations) from the Naval Postgraduate School (1991) and a master's degree in military studies from the Marine Corps Command and Staff College (1998).

During her early assignments, Herbert served within the Integrated Undersea Surveillance System at Naval Facility Bermuda; at commander, Oceanographic Systems Atlantic; and at Naval Ocean Processing Facility, Dam Neck, Virginia.

Additional shore assignments include satellite communications officer at Headquarters, U.S. Naval Forces Europe; executive officer, Fleet Surveillance Support Command; Joint Command, Control, Communications, Computer, and Intelligence instructor at the Joint Forces Staff College; commanding officer, Naval Computer and Telecommunications Station Washington; branch head, Naval Networks for OPNAV N6; and assistant chief of Naval Operations for the Next Generation Enterprise Network.

She also served as director of the Communications, Networks and Chief Information Officer (CIO) Division on the staff of the Deputy Chief of Naval Operations for Information Dominance.

Fleet assignments include combat systems officer embarked in USS George Washington (CVN-73) where she deployed to the Persian Gulf in support of Operations Southern Watch, Enduring Freedom and Iraqi Freedom; and assistant chief of staff for Communications and Information Systems (N6) to commander, Carrier Strike Group 7 embarked in USS Ronald Reagan (CVN-76) where she deployed to the Western Pacific and the Persian Gulf with Ronald Reagan Strike Group.

In June, 2011, Herbert assumed command of Navy Cyber Forces at Joint Expeditionary Base Little Creek-Fort Story, Virginia Beach, Virginia. She retired from active duty in January 2014.

== Awards and decorations ==
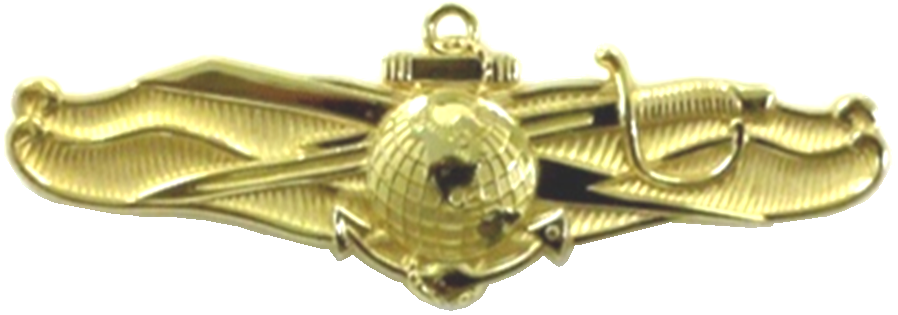

| Badge | Information Dominance Warfare Officer Device | | |
| 1st row | Legion of Merit | Defense Meritorious Service Medal | Meritorious Service Medal with 4 Gold 5/16-inch stars (five awards) |
| 2nd row | Navy and Marine Corps Commendation Medal with 1 Gold 5/16-inch star (two awards) | Navy and Marine Corps Achievement Medal | Navy Meritorious Unit Commendation with 3 Gold 5/16-inch stars (four awards) |
| 3rd row | Battle Efficiency Award | National Defense Service Medal with 1 Service star (two awards) | Armed Forces Expeditionary Medal |
| 4th row | Global War on Terrorism Expeditionary Medal | Global War on Terrorism Service Medal | Humanitarian Service Medal |
| 5th row | Navy and Marine Corps Sea Service Deployment Ribbon with 1 Service star (two awards) | Navy and Marine Corps Overseas Service Ribbon with 4 Service stars (five awards) | Pistol Marksmanship Medal with Sharpshooter Device |
| Badge | Integrated Undersea Surveillance System Insignia | | |
