= Gordon Martin =

Gordon Martin may refer to:

- Cyril Gordon Martin, English soldier
- Gordon Beattie Martin, Saskatchewan legislator
- Gordon Eugene Martin, American physicist
