= Cape Hatteras =

Cape in North Carolina, United States

- Cape
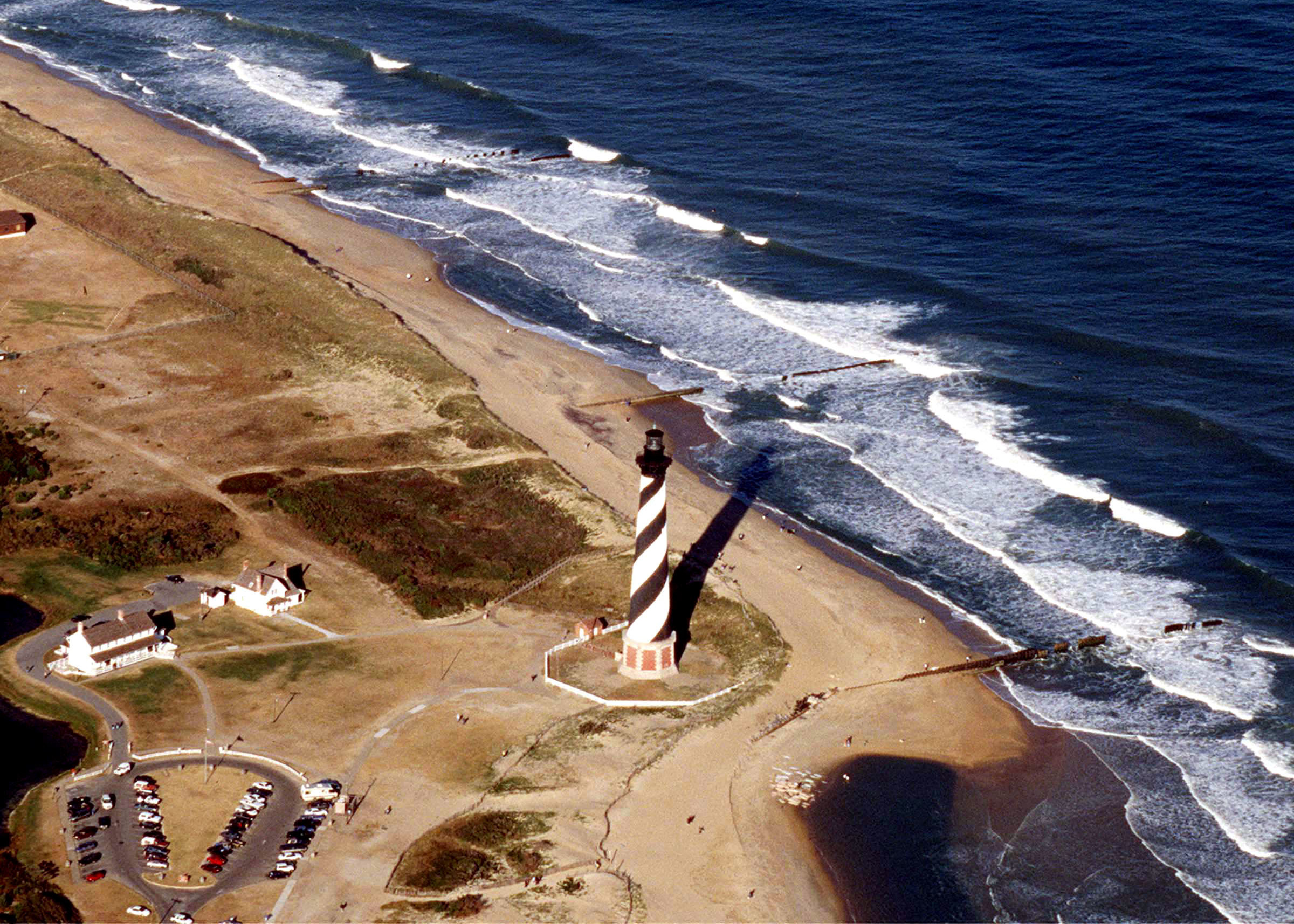
- An aerial view of the Cape Hatteras Lighthouse prior to its 1999 relocation
- Interactive map of Cape Hatteras
- Coordinates: 35°13′21″N 75°31′48″W
- Location: Hatteras Island, Dare County, North Carolina, United States

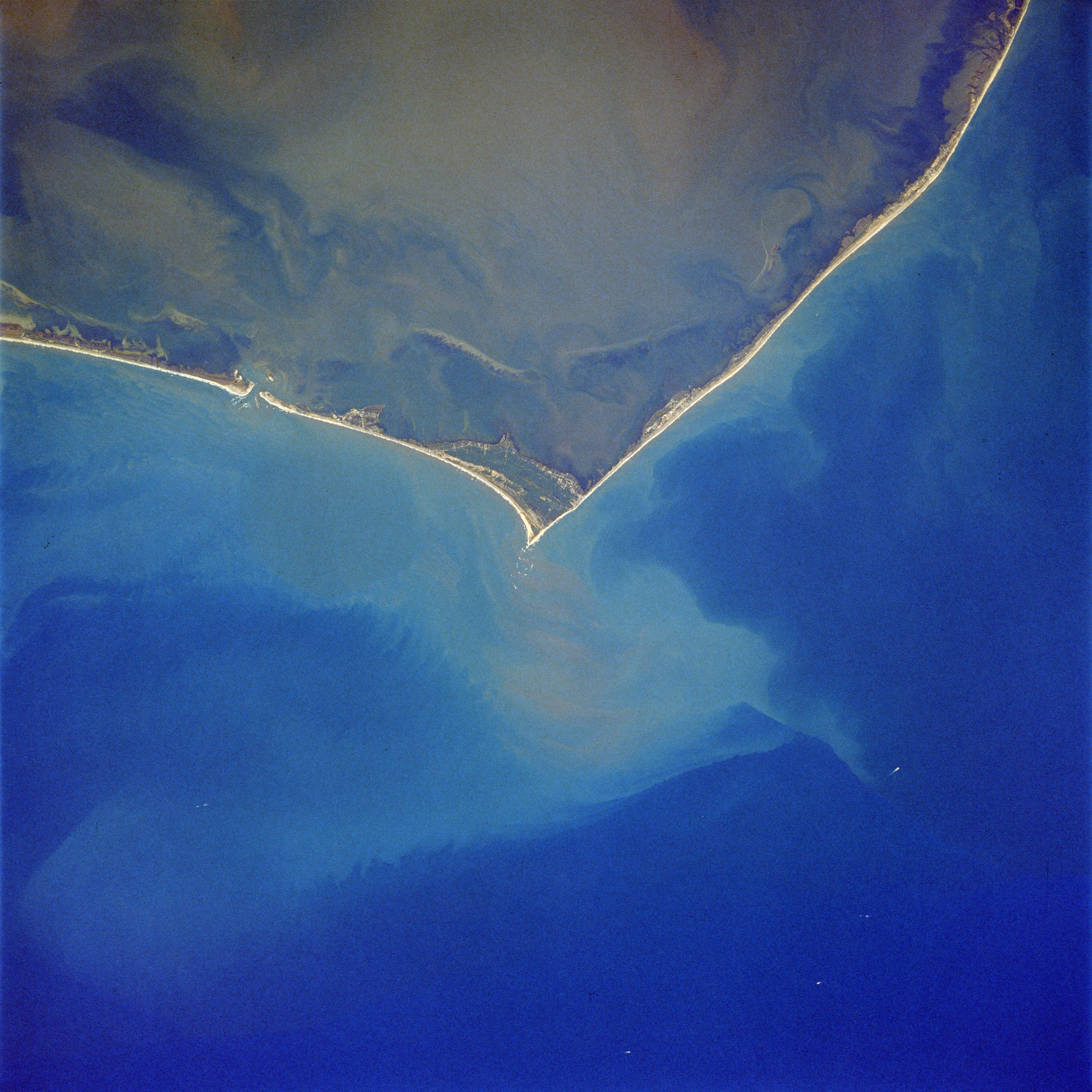
Cape Hatteras from space, still displaying sediment displaced by Hurricane Hugo, October 1989.

Cape Hatteras /ˈhætərəs/ is a cape located at a pronounced bend in Hatteras Island, one of the barrier islands of North Carolina.

As a temperate barrier island, the landscape has been shaped by wind, waves, and storms. There are long stretches of beach, sand dunes, marshes, and maritime forests in the area. A large area of the Outer Banks is part of a National Park, called the Cape Hatteras National Seashore. It is also the nearest landmass on the North American mainland to Bermuda, which is about 563 nautical miles (648 mi; 1,043 km) to the east-southeast.

The treacherous waters off the coast of the Outer Banks are known as the Graveyard of the Atlantic. Over 600 ships wrecked here as victims of shallow shoals, storms, and war. Diamond Shoals, a bank of shifting sand ridges hidden beneath the turbulent sea off Cape Hatteras, has never promised safe passage for ships. In the past 400 years, the graveyard has claimed many lives, but island villagers saved many. As early as the 1870s, villagers served in the United States Life-Saving Service. Others staffed lighthouses built to guide mariners. Few ships wreck today, but storms still uncover the ruins of the old wrecks that lie along the beaches of the Outer Banks.

Cape Hatteras National Seashore protects parts of three barrier islands: Bodie Island, Hatteras Island, and Ocracoke Island. Beach and sound access ramps, campgrounds, nature trails, and lighthouses can be found and explored on all three islands.

The community of Buxton lies on the inland side of the Cape itself, at the widest part of Hatteras Island. It is the largest community on the island, and is home to the governmental offices and schools for the island.

== Geography ==
Cape Hatteras lies in the chain of long, thin barrier islands of the Outer Banks, which arch out into the Atlantic Ocean away from the U.S. mainland, then back toward the mainland, creating lagoons and estuaries sheltered from the Atlantic Ocean. It is the site where the two great basins of the East Coast meet. The cape's shoals are collectively known as Diamond Shoals.

=== Climate ===
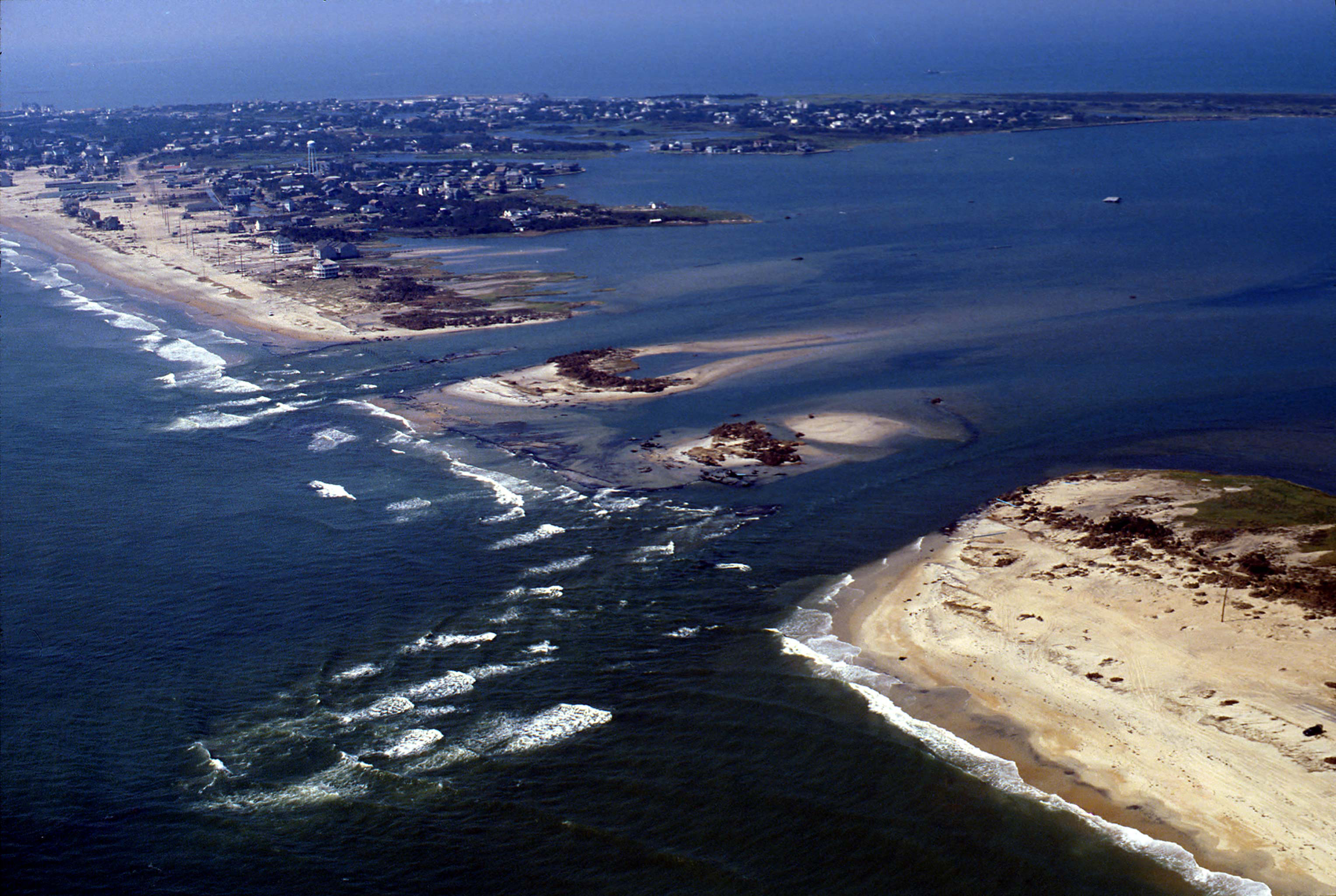
An aerial view of where Hurricane Isabel cut inlets into Hatteras Island

Cape Hatteras has a humid subtropical climate (Köppen: Cfa), with long, hot summers, and short, mild winters. Most of the area falls into USDA Plant Hardiness Zone 9. Cape Hatteras is surrounded by water, with Pamlico Sound to the west and the Atlantic Ocean to the east. The proximity to water moderates conditions throughout the year, producing cooler summers and warmer winters than inland areas of North Carolina. The cape is the northern limit of tropical fauna.

For all narrative below, consult the climate table, showing climate data for the 1991–2020 period. During the summer, average daily highs are in the 86–87 °F (30–31 °C) range, and occasional intense (but usually brief) thundershowers occur. As a result of its proximity to water, temperatures above 90 °F (32 °C) are rare, with an average of only 2.3 days annually above 90 °F (32 °C); one or two years out of each decade will not see any 90 °F readings. The coolest month, January, has a daily high of 55.4 °F (13.0 °C), with lows normally well above freezing at 40.6 °F (4.8 °C). The average window for freezing temperatures is from December 15 to March 6 (allowing a growing season of 283 days), between which there is an average of 16 nights with lows at or below the freezing mark. Extremes in temperature range from 6 °F (−14 °C) on January 21, 1985 up to 97 °F (36 °C) on June 27, 1952.

Climate chart for Cape Hatteras

Snowfall is observed only occasionally, and usually very light, with a median amount of 0. Precipitation, mostly in the form of rain, is over 61 inches (1,500 mm) per year, making Cape Hatteras the wettest coastal location in North Carolina. Precipitation is fairly evenly distributed throughout the year. However, April represents a slightly drier month than all others, while August to October are the wettest months. On average, September is the wettest month, owing to lingering summer thunderstorms and maximum frequency of tropical weather systems (hurricanes, tropical storms and tropical depressions) that affect the area with often-heavy to torrential rains, mostly from August to early October.

Due to its exposed position, Cape Hatteras is virtually the highest-risk area for hurricanes and tropical storms along the entire U.S. eastern seaboard. Cape Hatteras can experience significant wind and/or water damage from tropical systems moving (usually northward or northeastward) near or over North Carolina's Outer Banks, while other areas (i.e. Wilmington, NC or Myrtle Beach and Charleston, SC to the south and Norfolk, VA and Maryland's Eastern Shore to the north) experience much less, minimal or no damage. The Cape Hatteras area is infamous for being frequently struck by hurricanes that move up the East Coast of the United States. (Note: See for instance P. G. Wodehouse in Over Seventy (1956): "A thing about hurricanes I can never understand is why Cape Hatteras affects them so emotionally. Everything is fine up to there--wind at five miles an hour, practically a dead calm--but the moment a hurricane sees Caper Hatteras it shies like a startled horse and stars blowing a steady 125 m.p.h. hysteria of course, but why?")

The strike of Hurricane Isabel in 2003 was particularly devastating for the area. Isabel devastated the entire Outer Banks and also split Hatteras Island between the two small towns of Frisco and Hatteras. NC 12, which provides a direct route from Nags Head to Hatteras Island, was washed out when the hurricane created a new inlet. Students had to use a ferry to get to school. The inlet was filled in with sand by the Army Corps of Engineers, in a process which took nearly two months to complete. The road, electrical and water lines were quickly rebuilt when the inlet was filled. On September 6, 2019, Hurricane Dorian made landfall at Cape Hatteras.

Climate data for Cape Hatteras (Billy Mitchell Airport), 1991–2020 normals, (Note: Mean monthly maxima and minima (i.e. the expected highest and lowest temperature readings at any point during the year or given month) calculated based on data at said location from 1991 to 2020.) extremes 1893–present (Note: Official temperature and precipitation records for Cape Hatteras were kept at Hatteras from January 1893 to February 1957, and at Billy Mitchell Airport since March 1957. Snowfall and snow depth records date to 1 January 1908 and 1 January 1948 respectively. For more information, see ThreadEx.)
Month	Jan	Feb	Mar	Apr	May	Jun	Jul	Aug	Sep	Oct	Nov	Dec	Year
Record high °F (°C)	75 (24)	76 (24)	82 (28)	89 (32)	91 (33)	97 (36)	96 (36)	94 (34)	92 (33)	89 (32)	81 (27)	78 (26)	97 (36)
Mean maximum °F (°C)	68.8 (20.4)	68.5 (20.3)	72.6 (22.6)	77.7 (25.4)	83.9 (28.8)	89.1 (31.7)	90.6 (32.6)	90.2 (32.3)	87.9 (31.1)	82.8 (28.2)	76.4 (24.7)	71.1 (21.7)	91.5 (33.1)
Mean daily maximum °F (°C)	55.4 (13.0)	56.7 (13.7)	61.4 (16.3)	69.4 (20.8)	76.7 (24.8)	84.0 (28.9)	87.3 (30.7)	87.0 (30.6)	83.0 (28.3)	75.0 (23.9)	66.8 (19.3)	59.3 (15.2)	71.8 (22.1)
Daily mean °F (°C)	48.0 (8.9)	49.1 (9.5)	53.8 (12.1)	61.8 (16.6)	69.7 (20.9)	77.5 (25.3)	81.3 (27.4)	80.7 (27.1)	76.9 (24.9)	68.2 (20.1)	58.7 (14.8)	52.1 (11.2)	64.8 (18.2)
Mean daily minimum °F (°C)	40.6 (4.8)	41.5 (5.3)	46.2 (7.9)	54.1 (12.3)	62.7 (17.1)	70.9 (21.6)	75.3 (24.1)	74.4 (23.6)	70.8 (21.6)	61.3 (16.3)	51.5 (10.8)	44.9 (7.2)	57.8 (14.3)
Mean minimum °F (°C)	24.2 (−4.3)	27.4 (−2.6)	31.7 (−0.2)	40.6 (4.8)	49.2 (9.6)	59.3 (15.2)	67.0 (19.4)	65.3 (18.5)	59.3 (15.2)	46.2 (7.9)	36.6 (2.6)	30.6 (−0.8)	22.6 (−5.2)
Record low °F (°C)	6 (−14)	11 (−12)	19 (−7)	26 (−3)	39 (4)	44 (7)	52 (11)	56 (13)	45 (7)	32 (0)	22 (−6)	12 (−11)	6 (−14)
Average precipitation inches (mm)	4.91 (125)	4.34 (110)	4.43 (113)	3.92 (100)	4.37 (111)	4.41 (112)	5.39 (137)	6.73 (171)	7.63 (194)	5.59 (142)	4.76 (121)	4.73 (120)	61.21 (1,555)
Average snowfall inches (cm)	0.3 (0.76)	0.1 (0.25)	0.0 (0.0)	0.0 (0.0)	0.0 (0.0)	0.0 (0.0)	0.0 (0.0)	0.0 (0.0)	0.0 (0.0)	0.0 (0.0)	0.0 (0.0)	1.3 (3.3)	1.7 (4.3)
Average precipitation days (≥ 0.01 in)	10.9	10.5	10.7	8.9	9.1	10.1	11.5	11.8	11.2	9.5	9.8	11.2	125.2
Average snowy days (≥ 0.1 in)	0.4	0.3	0.0	0.0	0.0	0.0	0.0	0.0	0.0	0.0	0.0	0.3	1.0
Average relative humidity (%)	75.3	74.3	74.1	72.3	77.3	79.0	80.9	80.6	78.5	75.8	75.1	75.1	76.5
Average dew point °F (°C)	36.9 (2.7)	37.4 (3.0)	43.0 (6.1)	49.5 (9.7)	59.2 (15.1)	66.9 (19.4)	71.8 (22.1)	71.4 (21.9)	66.6 (19.2)	57.0 (13.9)	48.7 (9.3)	41.2 (5.1)	54.1 (12.3)
Mean monthly sunshine hours	153.7	162.8	224.8	261.3	278.3	272.4	282.9	267.1	233.0	207.2	170.8	142.8	2,657.1
Percentage possible sunshine	49	53	61	66	64	63	64	64	63	59	55	47	60
Source: NOAA (snowfall 1981–2010, relative humidity and sun 1961–1990)

See or edit raw graph data.

== History ==
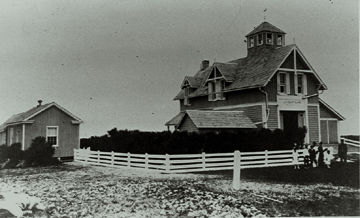
The Cape Hatteras Life Guard Station, which later became part of the Durant Motel, and was upended by Hurricane Isabel in 2003

The name Hatteras is the sixth oldest surviving English place-name in the U.S. An inlet north of the cape was named "Hatrask" in 1585 by Sir Richard Grenville, the admiral leading the Roanoke Colony expedition sent by Sir Walter Raleigh. It was later applied to the island and cape as well, and modified to "Hatteras". Hatteras is the name of the Hatteras Indians.

Because mariners use ocean currents to speed their journey, many ships venture close to Cape Hatteras when traveling along the eastern seaboard, risking the perils of sailing close to the shoals amid turbulent water and the frequent storms occurring in the area. So many ships have been lost off Cape Hatteras that the area is known as the "Graveyard of the Atlantic".

The first lighthouse at the cape was built in 1803; it was replaced by the current Cape Hatteras Lighthouse in 1870, which at 198.48 feet (60.50 m) from the ground to the tip of its lightning rod is the tallest lighthouse in the United States and one of the tallest brick lighthouses in the world. In 1999, as the receding shoreline had come dangerously close to Cape Hatteras Lighthouse, the 4830-ton lighthouse was lifted and moved inland a distance of 2,900 feet (880 m). Its distance from the seashore is now 1,500 feet (460 m), about the same as when it was originally built.

SS Dixie Arrow (shipwreck and remains), SS E.M. Clark (shipwreck and remains), SS Empire Gem (shipwreck and remains), and USS Monitor are listed on the National Register of Historic Places.

In 1956 the Naval Facility Cape Hatteras, adjacent to the lighthouse, became the eighth of nine shore terminals of the Atlantic Sound Surveillance System (SOSUS) operational for over twenty-six years. The antisubmarine ocean surveillance purpose was classified and covered under "oceanographic research" until well after its decommissioning in June 1982. By 1963 there were 122 Navy personnel and 180 dependents resident at the facility.

== Awards and recognition ==
Cape Hatteras has received the following awards:

- Top 10 U.S. Beaches, Travel Channel
- Top 10 U.S. Beaches for 2016, CNN
- America's Top 10 Beaches of 2015, Forbes

== Education ==
Residents are zoned to Dare County Schools. Zoned schools are Cape Hatteras Elementary School and Cape Hatteras Secondary School.

== Notes ==
Preceded by Buxton	Beaches of The Outer Banks	Succeeded by Frisco
