= Naval Facility Cape Hatteras =

US military installation, 1956–1982

Coordinates: 35°15′29.4″N 75°31′19.4″W

U.S. Naval Facility Cape Hatteras, probably mid 1960s.

Naval Facility Cape Hatteras (NAVFAC Cape Hatteras) was a Sound Surveillance System (SOSUS) shore terminal, during the Cold and located on Cape Hatteras near Buxton, North Carolina and adjacent to the old location of the Cape Hatteras lighthouse. NAVFAC Cape Hatteras, eighth of the initial nine Atlantic systems to be activated, was in commission 11 January 1956 to 30 June 1982.

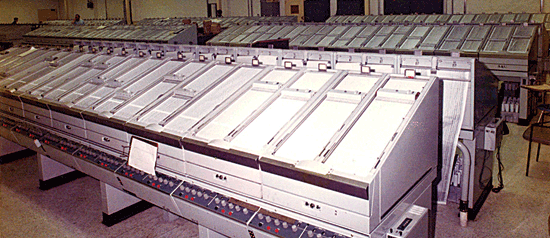
Lofargram writers on watch floor.

The system and shore facilities, in which output of the array at sea was processed and displayed by means of the Low Frequency Analyzer and Recorder (LOFAR), were officially described as being engaged in oceanographic research. The actual function of undersea surveillance was declassified in 1991 long after the facility had closed. In military construction hearings during 1964 before the Senate Committee on Armed Services the request for funding of recreational and other support buildings for the Naval Facility the Navy noted it was part of a program supporting continental air and missile defense forces without mention of its role in tracking Soviet missile submarines. On 26 June 1962 NAVFAC Cape Hatteras made the first SOSUS detection of a Soviet diesel submarine.

== Geography ==
Naval Facility Cape Hatteras was located on Cape Hatteras near Buxton, about 240-miles southeast from Raleigh; when the facility initially opened, it was only accessibly via ferry from the Oregon Inlet. The ferry discontinued service at night during winter months and there were frequent interruptions due to weather and sea conditions. By 1963 there were 122 Navy personnel and 180 dependents resident at the facility.

== History ==
The Sound Surveillance System (SOSUS) was one of the nine initial systems installed during the Cold War from 1956 to June 1982.

United States Coast Guard "Group Cape Hatteras" occupied some of the facility buildings from 1981 to 2005. The Coast Guard demolished remaining buildings and as of 2013, the site was desirable as beach access and possible construction of changing and rest rooms, but contaminated soil required environmental clean up.

As of 2026, the US Corps of Engineers removed 19,285 tons of petroleum impacted soil, 315 linear feet of asbestos pipes, and 3,050,000 pounds of concrete, abandoned utilities, fencing and asphalt. In 2026, after three years they found the origin of soil contamination in eight buried drums.
