= USNS Flyer =

Cargo ship launched in 1944

History

United States
- Name: Water Witch (1944–1946); American Flyer (1946–1965); Flyer (1965–1975)
- Builder: Moore Dry Dock Company, Oakland, California
- Yard number: 296
- Laid down: 30 October 1944
- Launched: 20 December 1944
- In service: 9 February 1965
- Out of service: 17 July 1975
- Identification: Official number: 247417; Signal: ANQN
- Fate: Sold for scrapping, 27 April 1976

General characteristics
- Tonnage: 6,214 GRT 1944 as built; 8,327 GRT 1964 as American Flyer; 9,250 DWT 1944 as built; 10,520 DWT 1964 as American Flyer
- Displacement: 7,300 long tons (7,417 t) light; 11,000 long tons (11,177 t) full
- Length: 459 ft (140 m)
- Beam: 63.1 ft (19.2 m)
- Draft: 28.8 ft (8.8 m)
- Propulsion: 2 boilers, steam turbine, single shaft, 6,000 shp (4,474 kW)
- Speed: 15.5 kn (17.8 mph; 28.7 km/h)
- Capacity: 6 passengers as American Flyer
- Crew: 54

USNS Flyer (T-AG-178), was a type C2-S-B1 cargo ship built for the Maritime Commission (MC) as Water Witch in service under charter by the commission to several lines until purchased in 1946 by United States Lines and renamed American Flyer. After being placed in the Reserve Fleet 14 December 1964 the title was transferred to the United States Navy for use as a deep ocean bathymetric survey ship supporting installation of the Sound Surveillance System (SOSUS). The Navy placed the ship in service 9 February 1965 with the name Flyer given on 22 March. The ship operated in that role until 1975.

== Construction ==
Water Witch was built under Maritime Commission] contract for MC hull 1209 by the Moore Dry Dock Company of Oakland, California, yard number 296. The keel was laid on 30 October 1944, and the ship launched on 20 December 1944, sponsored by Miss. Margaret Helen Finnel.

On registration the ship was assigned Official Number 247417 and signal ANQN. Registry information for American Flyer shows a crew of 54.

== Service history ==
=== Commercial ===
The ship was completed 14 March 1945 and placed in service under Maritime Commission agreement with McCormick Steamship Company. On 6 July 1946 Water Witch was bareboat chartered by American South African Lines until 22 October 1946 when United States Lines acquired the ship under the MC agreement until purchasing the ship from the Maritime Commission on 8 November 1946 for $960,642.42. On 27 December 1946 the ship was renamed American Flyer.

On 10 October 1962 the title to American Flyer was surrendered to the Maritime Administration as trade in credit with the line operating the ship under a bareboat charter until delivery to the James River Reserve Fleet on 14 December 1964.

=== Navy auxiliary ===
The ship was acquired by the US Navy from the Maritime Administration (MARAD) in a permanent transfer and placed in service on 9 February 1965, with the name Flyer assigned on 22 March 1965.

Flyer was converted for Naval service as a Miscellaneous Auxiliary, bathymetric survey ship, designated T-AG-178, to perform deep ocean surveys for Project Caesar, the unclassified cover name for installation of the Sound Surveillance System (SOSUS). USNS Flyer was operated by the Military Sea Transportation Service (MSTS) (current Military Sealift Command) for Project Caesar. The ship had a civilian MSTS crew of fourteen officers and thirty-seven seamen. A complement of civilian specialist would compose the survey party.

== Fate ==
Flyer was struck from the Naval Vessel Register on 17 July 1975 and delivered to the custody of the Maritime Administration in the Suisun Bay Reserve Fleet on 22 July 1975. On 27 April Flyer was sold for scrapping to American Ship Dismantlers, Inc.
