= USNS Zeus =

United States Navy cable ship built in 1984

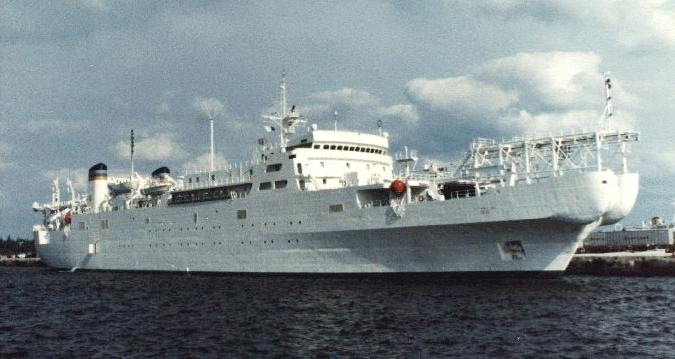
- USNS Zeus

History

United States
- Name: USNS Zeus
- Builder: National Steel and Shipbuilding, San Diego, California
- Laid down: 1 June 1981
- Launched: 30 October 1982
- In service: 19 March 1984
- Identification: IMO number: 7932408; MMSI number: 367212000; Callsign: NVTM
- Status: In service as of 2024

General characteristics
- Type: Cable Repair Ship (ARC)
- Displacement: 14,394 long tons (14,625 t)
- Length: 513 ft 6 in (156.51 m)
- Beam: 73 ft 4 in (22.35 m)
- Draft: 26 ft (7.9 m)
- Installed power: 5 x 3,600 bhp GM diesels each driving a 2,500 kVA, 60 Hz, 600 v GE alternator powering propulsion, cable, auxiliary and hotel services
- Propulsion: 2 × diesel-electric, two shafts; 10,200 bhp (7,600 kW); Fore and aft tunnel thrusters
- Speed: 15 knots (28 km/h; 17 mph)
- Complement: 51 civilian mariners, 6 Navy, 32 scientists
- Armament: None

USNS Zeus (T-ARC-7) is the first cable ship specifically built for the United States Navy. Though planned to be the first of two ships of her class, the second ship was not built, leaving Zeus as the only ship of her class. She is capable of laying 1,000 miles (1,600 km) of cable at depths of up to 9,000 feet (2,700 m).

== Function and Equipment ==
One of twenty-six ships in the Military Sealift Command's Special Mission Ships Program, Zeus's primary mission was to support the Sound Surveillance System (SOSUS) that was renamed a year after the ship's commissioning as the Integrated Undersea Surveillance System (IUSS) in 1985. The ship's function was to transport, deploy, retrieve and repair submarine cables and test underwater sound devices, with a secondary mission of conducting acoustic, hydrographic, and bathymetric surveys.

Zeus is equipped with a SIMRAD EM 121 sonar, and can also operate towed sidescan sonars and deploy data buoys to assist in oceanographic surveys. She is fitted with an extensive suite of equipment for the handling and deploying of undersea cable, including five cable tanks, tension machines, and other devices. She can also be fitted with the Heavy Overboarding System (HOS), a 72,000-pound (33 t) A-frame capable of deploying remotely operated vehicles (ROVs).

Five 3,600 brake horsepower General Motors diesels each driving a General Electric 2,500 kVA, 60 Hz, 600 v alternator provided power through a main alternating current bus for all ship power. Fourteen rectifiers from the bus supplied 750 v direct current for the two General Electric 5,000 brake horsepower propulsion motors. All engines could be on line providing maximum propulsion power for transit speeds while some engines might be shut down for lower speed work with cable. In port one engine could provide hotel service power.

Port quarter view showing stern overboarding structures

Structures at the stern formed a Heavy Overboarding System capable of deploying heavy equipment including free swimming heavy Cable Repair Systems, a 250 hp Sea Tractor for cable burial and deployment from either ship or a beach, and a 14,000 kilograms (31,000 lb) Sea Plow for cable burial.

== Operations ==
USNS Zeus is operated by the Military Sealift Command, part of the U.S. Transportation Command and the operator of the majority of the U.S. Navy's replenishment, transport and auxiliary ships. Assigned to the MSC Atlantic Special Mission Support Force, she is operated by a majority civilian crew, and is assigned no permanent homeport.

Zeus underwent an overhaul period at Norfolk, Virginia in 2008. In 2012, Zeus was assigned on a mission to lay an underwater fiber optic cable from the U.S. Naval station in Guantanamo Bay, Cuba to South Florida as part of a larger effort to upgrade the naval facility.

== Future ==
In June 2020, the Navy released a draft request for proposals for companies to compete to build a replacement for USNS Zeus known as the T-ARC(X), to be outfitted with cable handling equipment including cable tanks, cable transporters, cable tension machines, over-boarding sheaves and dynamometer cable fairleader. It will also be equipped with a moon pool and a variety of hull mounted sonar systems to support the primary and secondary missions. The government intended to award the contract by October 2020.
