= Integrated Undersea Surveillance System insignia =

Ocean Captivatism

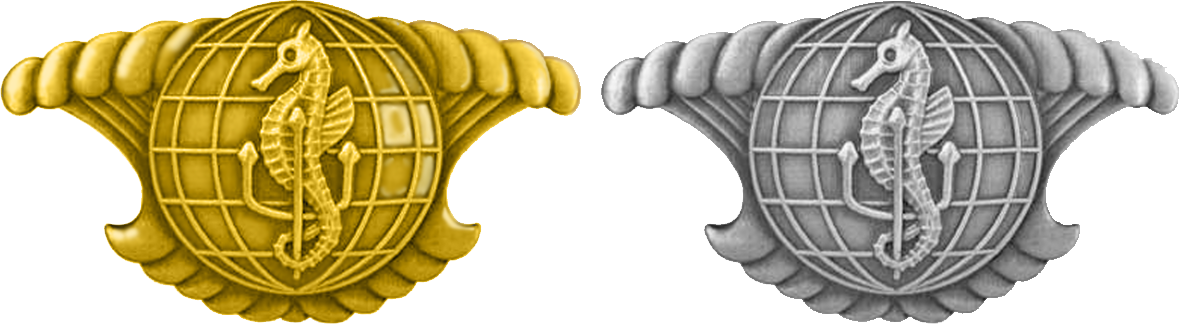
Integrated Undersea Surveillance System badges for officers and enlisted sailors, left and right respectively.

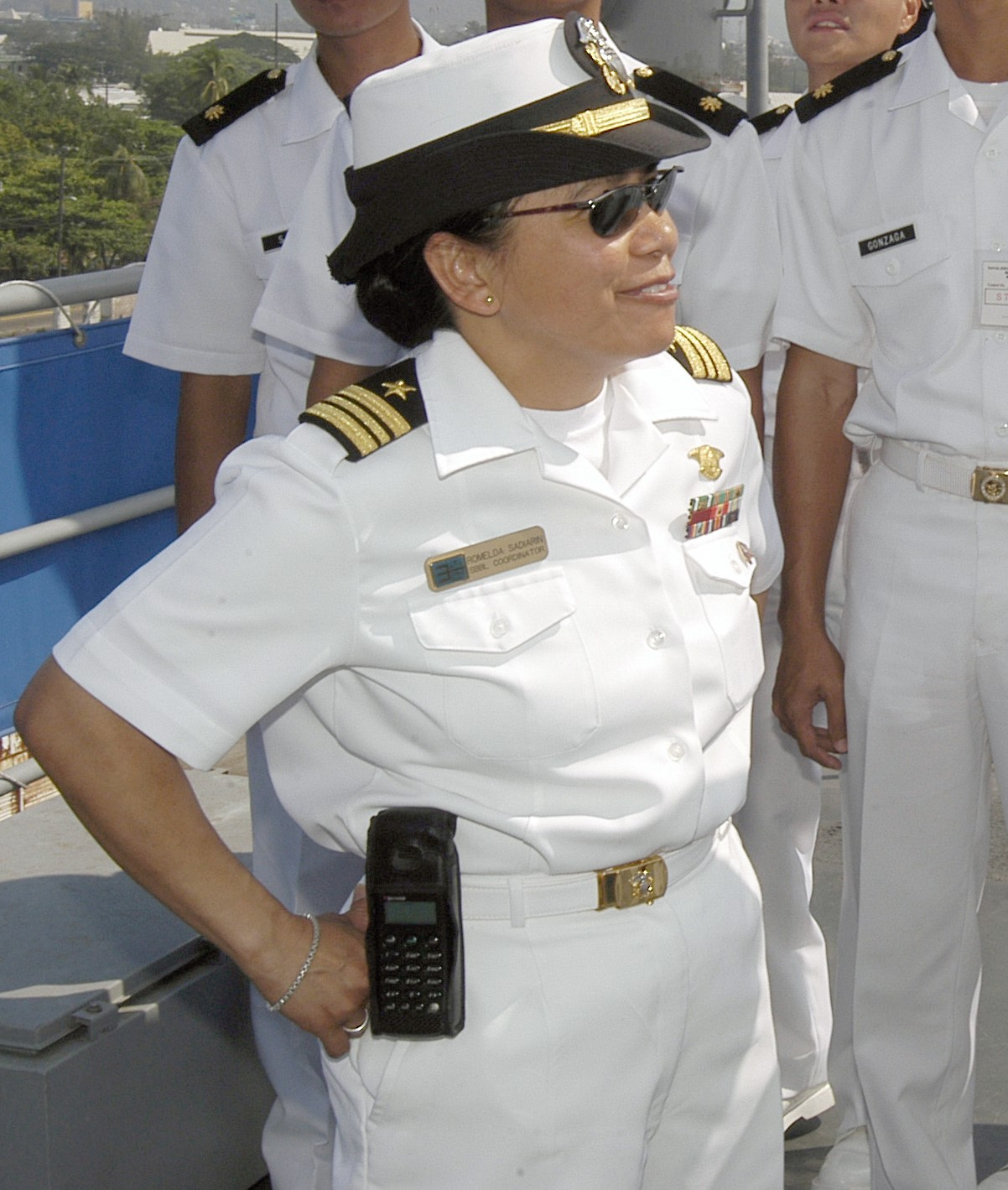
A U.S. Navy officer in 2004 wearing an IUSS badge

The Integrated Undersea Surveillance System breast insignia is a military badge of the United States Navy which was officially created by OPNAVINST 1020.5 on 24 December 1990. The insignia is awarded to those personnel who have been trained and qualified in naval sonar and undersea surveillance technology.

== History ==
Originally, formal designation as an IUSS specialist signified that eligible officer or enlisted personnel acquired specific IUSS knowledge, skill, and experience and had demonstrated proficiency at the professional level of competence required for satisfactory performance of assigned duties. Designated IUSS specialists were authorized to wear the IUSS breast insignia.

Currently, in order to be awarded the Integrated Undersea Surveillance System breast insignia, a service member must:

1. be permanently assigned to an IUSS command
2. be fully qualified in their assigned billet
3. be recommended by the chain of command, with approval of the Commanding Officer
4. complete 24 months of military service and also 12 months at an IUSS command
5. achieve the rank of E-4 or above
6. have no trait grades below 3.0 for two consecutive reporting periods prior to starting qualifications
7. complete the qualification program within 18 months

The IUSS Qualification Guide is used in completing all knowledge-based prerequisites.

The insignia, itself, consists of a gold or silver colored metal pin with a trident and seahorse twined on a globe superimposed on a breaking wave. The insignia is issued in two degrees: silver for enlisted personnel and gold for officers.

Enlisted sailors who are awarded the Integrated Undersea Surveillance System Specialist breast device are NOT authorized to place the designator (IUSS) after their rate. The now cancelled instruction OPNAVINST 1020.5A only authorized the wearing of the insignia, but not the addition of (IUSS) after the sailor's rate. Other warfare programs, such as ESWS authorize both the wearing of insignia and the addition of designation after the rate; however, the IUSS insignia was only ever authorized for wear.

The IUSS badge is one of a number of foreign badges authorized to be worn on Canadian Armed Forces uniform.

== See also ==
- Badges of the United States Navy
- Obsolete badges of the United States military
- Uniforms of the United States Navy
