= Naval Facility Point Sur =

- Location within California Location within the United States
- Location: Monterey County, California, United States
- Nearest city: Carmel, California
- Coordinates: 36°18′15″N 121°53′18″W
- Area: 92 acres (37 ha)
- Established: 1957
- Governing body: California State Park
Naval Facility Point Sur
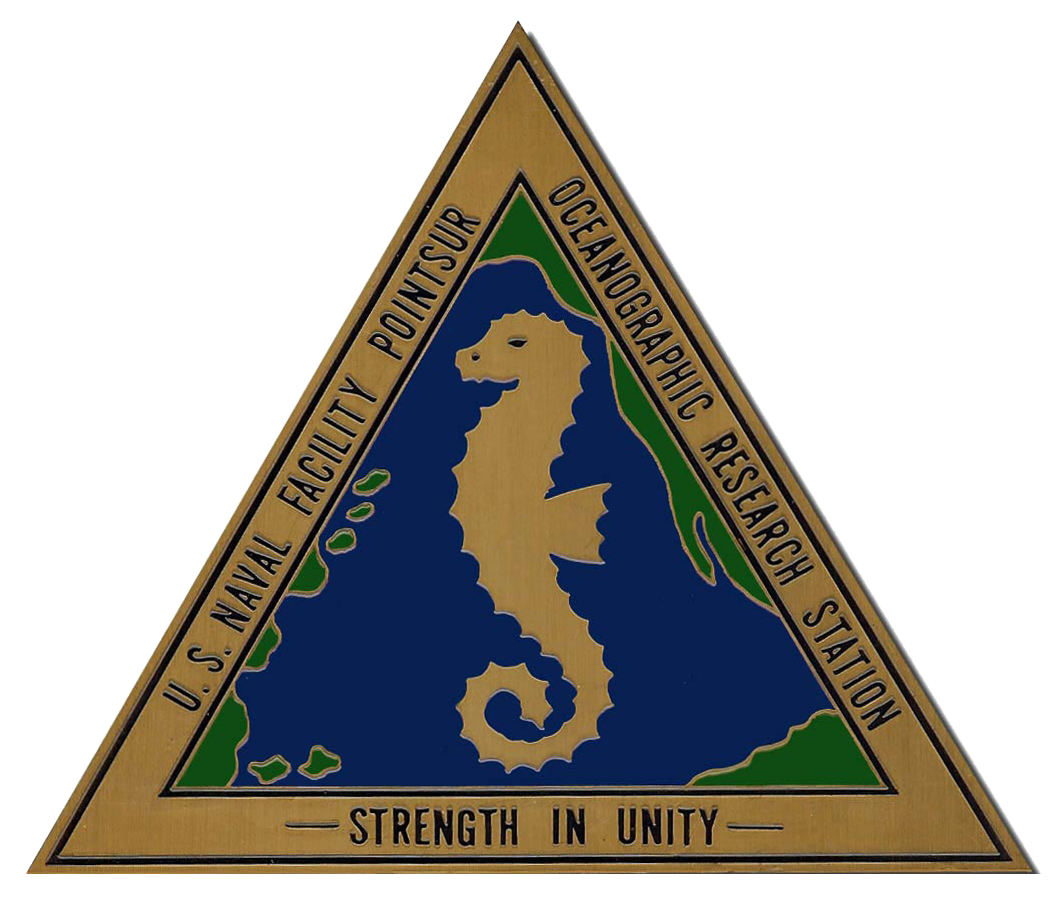
- NAVFAC Point Sur logo
- Active: January 1958 - October 1984
- Disbanded: Operations computerized and data transmitted to NAVFAC
- Country: United States of America
- Allegiance: (United States) U.S.
- Branch: U.S. Navy (Sound Surveillance System)
- Size: 10 officers, 96 enlisted personnel, and 18 civilians
- Part of: Oceanographic System Pacific (after 1964)

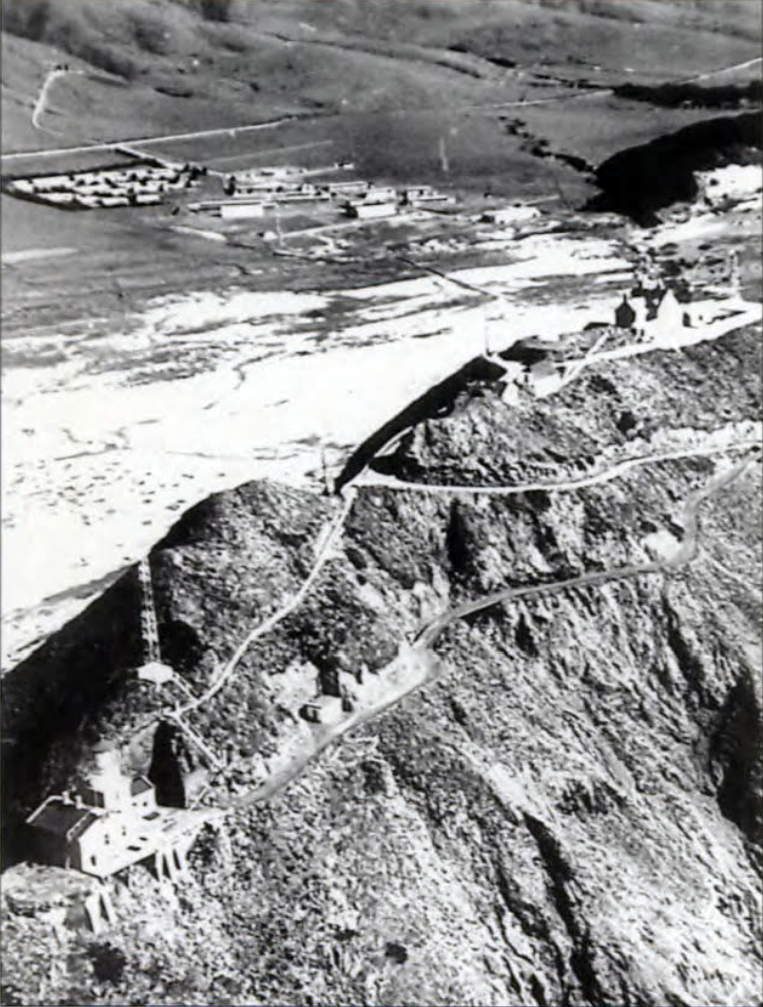
Aerial view of the Point Sur Lightstation with the Naval Facility Point Sur in the background in 1969.

Naval Facility Point Sur was one of 30 secret sites worldwide that were built during the Cold War to detect Soviet submarines. In 1958, the U.S. Navy built a Naval Facility ½ mile south of Point Sur on the Big Sur coast to provide submarine surveillance using the classified SOund SUrveillance System (SOSUS). The public was told the station was engaged in oceanographic research.

Long-range acoustic listening was first tested and partially developed at Point Sur light station with an associated SOFAR station. The facility was one of the stand-alone SOSUS stations around the world. NAVFAC Point Sur played a key role in identifying the location of the wrecked Soviet submarine Soviet submarine K-129, a portion of which was eventually raised in a significant intelligence coup. The NAVFAC was closed in 1984, when its operations were computerized and its data transmitted to another location.

All but one building was donated to California State Parks in 2000, which used some of the buildings for housing for a period of time. The facility is now open to the public for tours on weekends.

== History ==
During World War II, naval personnel stationed at Point Sur, California conducted experiments with early sonar and radar systems. In 1949, while conducting research into the use of sound to detect submarines, the U.S. Naval Research Laboratory reported it was able to detect submarines at ranges of 10 to 15 nautical miles (19 to 28 km; 12 to 17 mi) using SOFAR hydrophones off Point Sur. By the end of that year, they had expanded that range to several hundred miles. During the early period of the Cold War, the Soviet submarine fleet became the largest in the world.

=== Construction and operation ===
The U.S. Navy placed arrays of hydrophones on the ocean floor connected by underwater cables to shore terminals generically called "Naval Facilities" (NAVFACs) within which the low frequency signals were processed and analyzed by means of a Low Frequency Analyzer and Recorder (LOFAR) system. The early SOSUS arrays were positioned at the edge of the continental shelf at a depth of about 650 feet (200 meters) pointed into the deep ocean. At the time, cable lengths were limited to less than 150 miles (240 kilometers) so that NAVFACs had to be placed at coastal sites where the shelf break was close to land allowing access to the deep sound channel close to shore. Point Sur was chosen in part because of its proximity to a deep submarine canyon that cuts into the shelf near the Big Sur coast. The Sur Submarine Canyon reaches a depth of 3,000 ft (910 m) just 8 mi (13 km) south of Point Sur.

NAVFAC Point Sur, constructed in 1957 and commissioned on 8 January 1958, was located adjacent to the Point Sur Lighthouse 25 miles (40 km) south of Monterey, California along Highway 1. Point Sur was established as a stand-alone, self-sufficient base as were many of the Naval Facilities. (Note: Almost all NAVFACs were isolated from Naval bases. The first operational array was installed at Eleuthera, Bahamas that was considered an isolated location with few amenities at the time. NAVFAC Nantucket was far from bases.)

The antisubmarine surveillance mission of SOSUS, its facilities and name itself was classified until 1991 covering the facility's entire operational span. Construction and maintenance was done under the unclassified name Project Caesar. An official cover story was written that described their mission of oceanographic research. Locally, the sign at the NAVFAC Point Sur entrance indicated the station was engaged in oceanographic research.

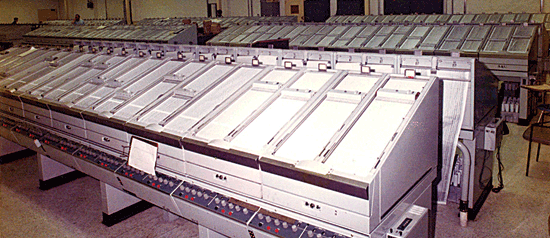
LOFARgram writers on watch floor.

NAVFAC Point Sur was part of a worldwide network of shore stations connected to undersea hydrophone arrays that tracked the movement of Soviet submarines. When Commander, Oceanographic System Pacific was established in 1964 the facility became part of that command. The facility provided continuous support to undersea surveillance and was staffed by ten officers, 96 enlisted personnel, and 18 civilians. The personnel at the station had the mission to "support antisubmarine warfare command and tactical forces by detecting, classifying, and providing timely reporting" of Soviet submarines.

=== Facilities ===
Base facilities, aside from the Terminal Building where the cable terminated and operations were conducted, included an administration building, gym, bowling alley, enlisted men's club, theater, wardroom, Navy Exchange, Chief Petty Officers' club, family and single-men's housing, and operations facilities.

=== Awards ===
During its twenty-six years of operation, The command was awarded the Meritorious Unit Commendation in 1969, the Efficiency "E" in both 1977 and 1983, and was also rated as the top Naval Facility in 1983 by Commander Oceanographic Systems Pacific (COSP), achieving the system's first "clean sweep" of operations, maintenance, and efficiency awards given by the task group commander.

=== Recovery of K-129 ===
The Point Sur facility played a key role in locating the wreck of Soviet submarine K-129. On March 8, 1968, the boat sank without a trace in the ocean northwest of Hawaii. After months of searching, the Soviet navy was unable to locate the wreck. Naval Facility Point Sur was asked to review its acoustic data. The staff was able to isolate a sonic signature on its LOFAR recordings of an implosion event on that date. Using NAVFAC Point Sur's date and time of the event, NAVFAC Adak and the U.S. West Coast NAVFAC were also able to isolate the acoustic event, making it possible to triangulate the ship's position. This led to a top-secret recovery program and eventually to Project Azorian, which resulted in the United States Central Intelligence Agency recovering a portion of the submarine. The CIA considered the project to be one of the greatest intelligence coups of the Cold War.

=== SOSUS consolidation ===
NAVFAC Point Sur was decommissioned on 1 October 1984, when its operations were computerized and the data received there transmitted to NAVFAC Centerville Beach on the California coast 260 miles (420 km) north of San Francisco. In 1993, data from the Centerville Beach location was transmitted to NAVFAC Whidbey Island, Washington.

By the 1980s cable and other technology had advanced so that the shore stations were being consolidated with their array data either being "remoted" or redirected to central processing facilities in the Atlantic at Naval Ocean Processing Facility in Dam Neck, Virginia and in the Pacific at Ford Island, Hawaii. The consolidation saved money, particularly in personnel costs, as well as allowing centralized processing. In 1984 the mobile Surveillance Towed Array Sensor System (SURTASS) entered the surveillance equation and in 1985, after Point Sur had been decommissioned, the system itself was renamed Integrated Undersea Surveillance System (IUSS) to reflect that change.

The US Navy Chief Warrant Officer and communications specialist John Anthony Walker began spying for the Soviet Union in 1968. Before he was arrested in 1985, he gave them SOSUS operational information which compromised its effectiveness.

== Possible research use ==
When the Cold War gradually ended, the U.S. Navy allowed scientists increased access to the SOSUS system for basic research. In 2007, oceanographers at the Naval Postgraduate School attempted to persuade the Navy that commanders would benefit from the ability to train on the SOSUS system at Point Sur. The Naval Postgraduate School staff believed commanders' knowledge of the ocean environment, underwater acoustics, and active and passive sonar would help them make effective decisions during combat. The oceanographers also believed geologists could benefit from their ability to research underwater earthquakes and volcanic eruptions. Marine biologists could listen to whales and other sea mammals as they migrate, and determine environmental conditions in their habitat. They estimated the cost to build new labs and renew use of the SOSUS system at $10 million, but the U.S. Navy did not accept their recommendation.

== Current disposition ==
Except for one building retained by the U. S. Navy, the entire facility was transferred to the California State Park system in 2000. It became part of Point Sur State Historic Park. The state park is no longer using the facility's housing. As of October 2019, the facility is open to the public for limited, guided tours on Saturdays and Sundays.

On February 3, 2017, the California Historical Resources Commission nominated Naval Facility Point Sur for the National Register of Historic Places. It was chosen in part because Point Sur NAVFAC is one of the last remaining Sound Surveillance System (SOSUS) facilities, and the only one remaining on the West Coast. (Note: The reference, news piece, on preservation and the park, contains inexpert speculation by a State Park volunteer regarding SOSUS technical matters, impact of Walker and that "a unique submarine canyon just south of the light station that allows sound to travel great distances" — the deep sound channel was the mechanism.)
