= Gordon Eugene Martin =

American physicist (born 1925)

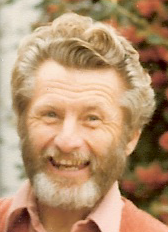
- Born: August 22, 1925 (age 101); San Diego, California, U.S.
- Education: University of California, Berkeley; University of California, Los Angeles; San Diego State University; University of Texas at Austin
- Scientific career
- Fields: piezoelectricity linear algebra
- Workplaces: Navy Electronics Laboratory; Martin Acoustic Software Technology

Gordon Eugene Martin (born August 22, 1925) is an American physicist and author in the field of piezoelectric materials for underwater sound transducers. He wrote early computer software automating iterative evaluation of direct computer models through a Jacobian matrix of complex numbers. His software enabled the Navy Electronics Laboratory (NEL) to accelerate design of sonar arrays for tracking Soviet Navy submarines during the Cold War.

== Early years ==
Gordon was born 22 August 1925 in San Diego. He was the third of five sons of Carl Martin and Ruth (Fountain) Martin. His older brother Harold enlisted in the Army National Guard and was serving on Oahu in 1941. Gordon communicated with his brother's anti-aircraft facility by amateur radio prior to the attack on Pearl Harbor, and relayed information to and from other San Diego families with National Guard members on Oahu.

== United States Navy ==
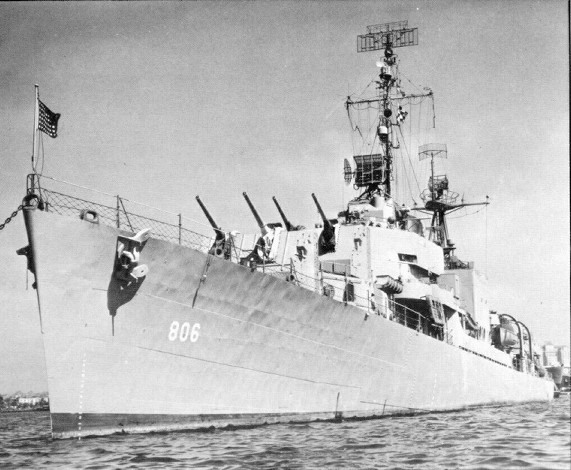
Photo of USS Higbee (DD-806) while Martin was cryptography officer.

Martin enlisted in the V-12 Navy College Training Program at Kansas State Teachers College in 1943 and transferred to the University of Texas Naval Reserve Officer Training Corps. Following commissioning in 1945, Ensign Martin served as cryptography officer aboard the destroyer USS Higbee (DD-806). Following release to reserve status after World War II, he completed electrical engineering degree requirements at University of California, Berkeley and in 1947 joined the NEL team in San Diego continuing underwater sound research begun in 1942 by Glen Camp at the University of California, San Diego campus. His early work involved measurement of piezoelectric characteristics of ammonium dihydrogen phosphate (ADP) and Rochelle salt. Lieutenant (junior grade) Martin was recalled to active duty during the Korean War as the first executive officer of the prototype SOSUS station on the island of Eleuthera. As the SOSUS network expanded Lieutenant Martin moved to the United States Navy Underwater Sound Laboratory in New London, Connecticut. Martin's 1954 publication describing relationships of circuit coefficients and critical frequencies of maximum and minimum admittance in piezoelectric materials was later cited in the Institute of Electrical and Electronics Engineers (IEEE) standard on piezoelectricity. From 1954 to 1960 he led the NEL development team for a variable magnetic reluctance transducer intended for a low-frequency array.

== Software development ==
Early sonar transducers had been developed from simplistic design assumptions followed by a trial and error design modification if the transducer failed to meet performance goals. That design approach became impractical for the large number of variables involved in optimized electrical coupling of array elements coupled acoustically by the physics of fluid water. NEL explored transducer theory with tensor analysis and continuum mechanics to determine viscous and hysteretic dissipative effects of transducer materials and radiation impedance of transducers in the water medium. NEL's mathematical models for mutual radiation impedance of transducer elements overwhelmed mechanical calculators and taxed capabilities of contemporary electronic computers.

In 1961, the United States and United Kingdom undertook a joint effort to develop digital computer software for analysis and design using the ALGOL-based Navy Electronics Laboratory International Algorithmic Compiler (NELIAC). Early software used direct models to determine critical resonance and antiresonance frequencies of piezoelectric materials and immitances at those frequencies. Results were graphed and solutions were determined to the desired accuracy by visual comparison of successive runs of the direct model software. Martin developed "find parameters" software evaluating capacitance, dissipation, resonance, and antiresonance with a Jacobian matrix and its inverse to determine losses separately for dielectric, elastic, and piezoelectric properties of individual barium titanate ceramic components. He completed the software in the summer of 1964 and it was announced at the September, 1964, seminar of the Office of Naval Research. His software was translated from NELIAC to Fortran and distributed in 1965. His automated approach to inverse modeling was subsequently presented at the 1974 IEEE Ultrasonic Manufacturers Association conference and the 1980 meeting of the Acoustical Society of America.

Martin completed a doctoral dissertation on lateral effects in piezoelectric systems at the University of Texas from 1964 to 1966; and continued working at NEL until his retirement in 1980. Shortly before retirement, he was awarded a patent (assigned to the United States Navy) for discrete amplitude shading for lobe-suppression in a discrete transducer array.

Martin founded Martin Analysis Software Technology Company following retirement; and contracted with the Navy for high-resolution beamforming with generalized eigenvector/eigenvalue (GEVEV) digital signal processing from 1985 through 1987 and for personal computer aided engineering (PC CAE) of underwater transducers and arrays from 1986 through 1989. Martin published an expanded theory of matrices in 2012 entitled A New Approach to Matrix Analysis, Complex Symmetric Matrices, and Physically Realizable Systems.

== Publications ==
- Variable-frequency Oscillator Circuits Possessing Exceptional Stability (1951)
- Determination of Equivalent‐Circuit Constants of Piezoelectric Resonators of Moderately Low Q by Absolute‐Admittance Measurements (1954)
- Directional Properties of Continuous Plane Radiators with Bizonal Amplitude Shading (1955 with Hickman)
- Broad-Band, High-Power, Low-Frequency Variable-Reluctance Projector Array (1956 with Byrnes & Hickman)
- Magnetic Materials for Electromagnetic Transducer Applications (1958)
- An Investigation of Electroacoustic Reciprocity in the Near Field (1961)
- Reciprocity Calibration in the Near Field (1961)
- Near Field of a Shaded Radiator (1961)
- Vibrations of Longitudinally Polarized Ferroelectric Cylindrical Tubes (1963)
- New Standard for Measurements of Certain Piezoelectric Ceramics (1963)
- Radiation Impedances of Plane‐Array Elements (1963)
- Velocity Control of Transducer Arrays (1963)
- On the Properties of Segmented Ferroelectric Ceramic Systems (1964)
- On the Theory of Segmented Electromechanical Systems (1964)
- Vibrations of Coaxially Segmented, Longitudinally Polarized Ferroelectric Tubes (1964)
- Computer Design of Transducers (1964)
- Measurement of the Gross Properties of Large Segmented Ceramic Tubes (1965)
- Effects of Static Stress on the Dielectric, Elastic, and Piezoelectric Properties of Ceramics (1965)
- Dielectric, Piezoelectric, and Elastic Losses in Longitudinally Polarized Segmented Ceramic Tubes (1965)
- On the propagation of longitudinal stress waves in finite solid elastic horns (1967)
- Comments on the Possible Resurgence of Magnetostriction Transducers for Large Ship Sonars (1967 with Berlincourt, Schenck & Smith)
- Near‐Field and Far‐Field Radiation from an Experimental Electrically Steered Planar Array (1967)
- Dielectric, Elastic and Piezoelectric Losses in Piezoelectric Materials (1974)
- Vibrations of plates and cylindrical shells in an acoustic medium (1976)
- Thirty years' progress in transducer source and receive arrays (1977)
- Economical computation of array gain of large lattice acoustic arrays in anisotropic sea noise (1977)
- Effects of dissipation in piezoelectric materials: Reminiscence (1980)
- Discrete amplitude shading for lobe‐suppression in discrete array (1982)
- The 3‐3 parameters for piezoelectric ceramics: New parameter‐measurement relations and transducer design implications (1982 with Johnson)
- Analysis of intermodal coupling in piezoelectric ceramic rings (1983 with Benthien)
- Degradation of angular resolution for eigenvector-eigenvalue (EVEV) high-resolution processors with inadequate estimation of noise coherence (1984)
- Analyses of large arrays: Brief theory and some techniques used in 1954–1985 (1985)
- Transducer longitudinal‐vibrator equivalent circuits and related topics (1990)
- Limits of dissipative coefficients in piezoelectric transverse isotropic materials (2011)
- A New Approach to Matrix Analysis, Complex Symmetric Matrices, and Physically Realizable Systems (2012)
