= SOSUS =

Cold War-era passive, fixed array undersea surveillance system

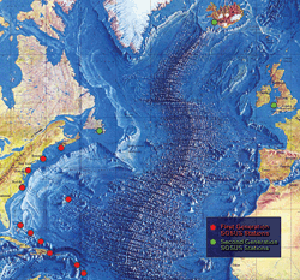
First SOSUS stations

Sound Surveillance System (SOSUS) was the original name for a submarine detection system based on passive sonar developed by the United States Navy to track Soviet submarines. The system's true nature was classified with the name and acronym SOSUS classified as well. The unclassified name Project Caesar was used to cover the installation of the system and a cover story developed regarding the shore stations, identified only as a Naval Facility (NAVFAC), being for oceanographic research. The name changed to Integrated Undersea Surveillance System (IUSS) in 1985, as the fixed bottom arrays were supplemented by the mobile Surveillance Towed Array Sensor System (SURTASS) and other new systems. The commands and personnel were covered by the "oceanographic" term until 1991 when the mission was declassified. As a result, the commands, Oceanographic System Atlantic and Oceanographic System Pacific became Undersea Surveillance Atlantic and Undersea Surveillance Pacific, and personnel were able to wear insignia reflecting the mission.

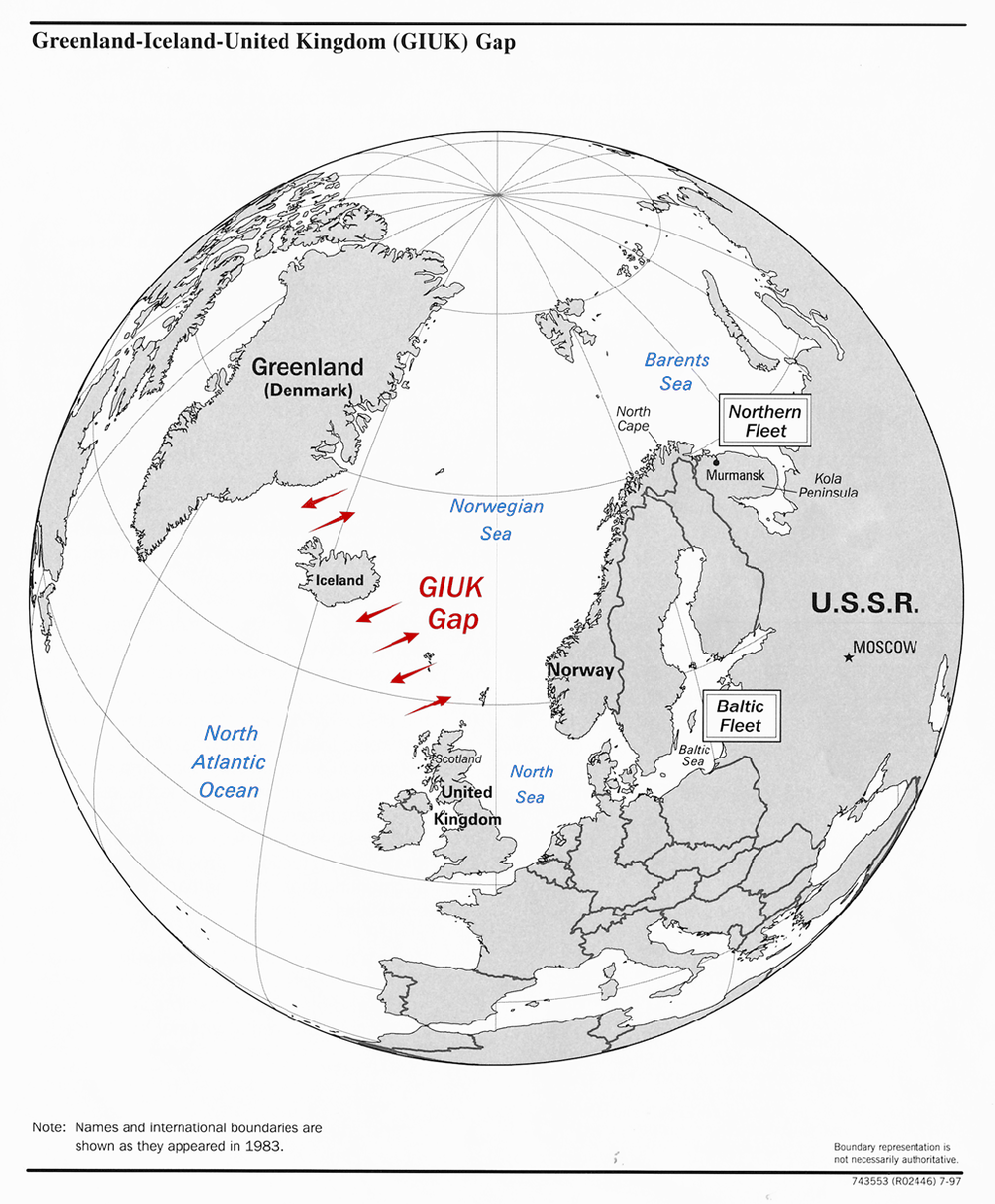
The GIUK gap

The original system was capable of oceanic surveillance with the long ranges made possible by exploiting the deep sound channel (SOFAR channel). An indication of ranges is the first detection, recognition and reporting of a Soviet nuclear submarine coming into the Atlantic through the Greenland-Iceland-United Kingdom (GIUK) gap by an array terminating at NAVFAC Barbados on 6 July 1962. The linear arrays with hydrophones placed on slopes within the sound channel enabled beamforming processing at the shore facilities to form azimuthal beams. When two or more arrays held a contact, triangulation provided approximate positions for air or surface assets to localize. (Note: Before the nature of the arrays became known, many writers assumed SOSUS was a barrier system, rather than arrays giving surveillance of entire ocean basins. An associated program, Colossus, was such a system intended to be installed across straits.)

SOSUS grew out of tasking in 1949 to scientists and engineers to study the problem of antisubmarine warfare. It was implemented as a chain of underwater hydrophone arrays linked by cable, based on commercial telephone technology, to shore stations located around the western Atlantic Ocean from Nova Scotia to Barbados. The first experimental array was a six-element test array laid at Eleuthera in the Bahamas in 1951, followed, after successful experiments with a target submarine, in 1952 by a fully-functional 1,000 ft (304.8 m), forty-hydrophone array. At that time the order for stations was increased from six to nine. The then-secret 1960 Navy film Watch in the Sea describes the production arrays as being 1,800 ft (548.6 m) long. In 1954, the order was increased by three more Atlantic stations and an extension into the Pacific, with six stations on the West Coast and one in Hawaii.

In September 1954, Naval Facility Ramey was commissioned in Puerto Rico. Others of the first Atlantic phase followed, and in 1957 the original operational array at Eleuthera got an operational shore facility as the last of the first phase of Atlantic systems. The same year, the Pacific systems began to be installed and activated. Over the next three decades, more systems were added; NAVFAC Keflavik, Iceland in 1966 and NAVFAC Guam in 1968 being examples of expansion beyond the western Atlantic and eastern Pacific. Shore upgrades and new cable technology allowed system consolidation until by 1980 that process had resulted in many closures of the NAVFACs with centralized processing at a new type facility, Naval Ocean Processing Facility (NOPF), that by 1981 saw one for each ocean and mass closing of the NAVFACs.

As the new mobile systems came on line, the original arrays were deactivated and some turned over for scientific research. The surveillance aspect continues with new systems under Commander, Undersea Surveillance.

== History ==
SOSUS history began in 1949 when the US Navy approached the Committee for Undersea Warfare, an academic advisory group formed in 1946 under the National Academy of Sciences, to research antisubmarine warfare. As a result, the Navy formed a study group designated Project Hartwell, named for the University of Pennsylvania's G.P. Hartwell who was the Deputy Chairman of the Committee for Undersea Warfare, (Note: An alternative story is that it was named for a local bar popular with MIT faculty.) under Massachusetts Institute of Technology (MIT) leadership. The Hartwell panel recommended spending of US$10,000,000 (equivalent to $135,310,000 in 2025) annually to develop systems to counter the Soviet submarine threat consisting primarily of a large fleet of diesel submarines.

That group also recommended a system to monitor low-frequency sound in the SOFAR channel using multiple listening sites equipped with hydrophones and a processing facility that could calculate submarine positions over hundreds of miles. (Note: The cited Project HARTWELL report first links arrays with fleet type submarines towing such an array in the GIUK then refers to potential exploitation of the deep sound channel low frequency sounds.)

=== Research ===
As a result of the Hartwell group's recommendations, the Office of Naval Research (ONR) contracted with American Telephone and Telegraph Company (AT&T), with its Bell Laboratories research and Western Electric manufacturing elements, to develop a long range, passive detection system, based on bottom arrays of hydrophones. The system, using equipment termed Low Frequency Analyzer and Recorder and a process termed Low Frequency Analysis and Recording, both with the acronym LOFAR, was to be based on AT&T's sound spectrograph, developed for speech analysis and modified to analyze low-frequency underwater sounds. This research and development effort was given the name Project Jezebel. The origin of the project name was explained by Robert Frosch to Senator Stennis during a 1968 hearing. It was because of the low frequencies, "about the A below middle C on the piano" (about 100–150 cycles) and "Jezebel" being chosen because "she was of low character." (Note: This frequency would be approximately A2 on the musical scale, which is two As below middle C)

Jezebel and LOFAR branched into the localization of submarines with the AN/SSQ-28 passive omnidirectional Jezebel-LOFAR sonobuoy introduced in 1956 for use by the air antisubmarine forces. That sonobuoy gave the aircraft cued by SOSUS access to the same low frequency and LOFAR capability as SOSUS. Bell Telephone Laboratories time delay correlation was used to fix target position with two or more sonobuoys in a technique named COrrelation Detection And Ranging (CODAR). This, and later specialized, sonobuoys equipped with a small explosive charge could be used in an active mode to detect the echo off the target. The active mode was named by engineers developing the technique "Julie" after a burlesque dancer whose "performance could turn passive buoys active."

Related research, based at Columbia University's Hudson Laboratory, was designated Project Michael. Woods Hole Oceanographic Institution and Scripps Institution of Oceanography were also tasked to develop an understanding of long-range sound transmission under Project Michael. The need to better understand the acoustic environment drove much of the oceanographic research by both the Navy and institutions with Navy funding for oceanography. A major, long-term research program spanning over 25 years, the Long Range Acoustic Propagation Program (LRAPP), made significant progress in such understanding and influenced decisions in SOSUS, significantly the SOSUS expansion into the eastern Atlantic. (Note: The sometimes mentioned Sea Spider "system" was simply a complex and unsuccessful experiment with a very large suspended array in the Pacific. It was part of LRAPP as noted on page 181 of the reference. The experiment was part of the Pacific Acoustic Research Kaneohe — Alaska (PARKA) II experiment in 1969. Parts of Sea Spider ended up off Bermuda, designated Testbed for more experiments until that installation also failed. That array was installed by the unusual cable and installation vessel Naubuc. Details of the Sea Spider platform itself may be found in Project Pacific Sea Spider - Technology Used In Developing a Deep-Ocean Ultrastable Platform.)

=== Development and installation ===
The hardware technology was largely that of the commercial telephone system and oil exploration. Cable laying was a capability AT&T and other entities had developed for decades for commercial communications cables. The understanding of the ocean acoustic environment made the system possible rather than development of new technology. SOSUS was a case of new understanding of the environment and then application of largely existing technology and even equipment to the problem.

The forty hydrophones spaced on the array provided the aperture for signal processing to form horizontal azimuthal beams of two to five degrees wide, each beam with a LOFAR analyzer and capability to do narrow-band frequency analysis to discriminate signal from ocean noise and to identify specific frequencies associated with rotating machinery. The NAVFAC watch floor had banks of displays using electrostatic paper, similar to that used for echograms in depth finders.

LOFARgram

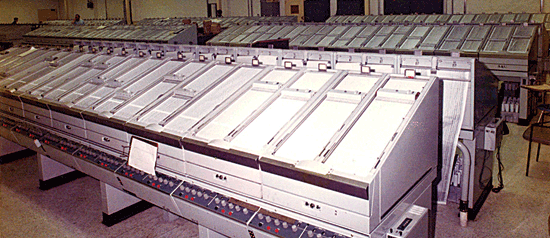
LOFARgram writers on NAVFAC watch floor

The product of these displays was the LOFARgram which graphically represented acoustic energy and frequency against time. Those were examined by the personnel trained to identify submarine signatures. When two or more arrays held a target the bearings from each array gave an estimated target position by triangulation. The system could provide cuing information on the presence of the submarines and an approximate location for air or surface antisubmarine warfare assets to localize the target. The first Atlantic stations, ranging from Nova Scotia to Barbados, formed a long line semicircle looking into the Western Atlantic basin with geographic separation for contact correlation and triangulation.

=== Security ===
The combination of research and engineering under Jezebel and Michael into an actual broad area surveillance system as seen by Project Hartwell's Frederick V. Hunt became the Sound Surveillance System with the acronym SOSUS. Both the full name and acronym were classified. There were occasional slips. A contractor for the Office of Naval Research, Fleet Analysis and Support Division published an unclassified report with "SOSUS" in association with the system acronym "SOSS", defined as "Sound Search Station", and a capability to display data from sonobuoys side by side on either aircraft or SOSS displays in contact classification as either friendly or unfriendly targets. The unclassified name Project Caesar was given to cover development and installation of the resulting system.

A cover story was developed to explain the visible shore installations, the Naval Facilities, and the commands under which they fell. The cover explained that data gathered by oceanographic and acoustic surveys with ships could at times be collected "more expeditiously and more economically by means of shore stations. These are the U. S. Naval Facilities." The cover extended to the names of the commands and training of personnel with overall commands designated Ocean Systems Atlantic and Ocean Systems Pacific, and terms such as Ocean Technician [OT] and Oceanographic Research Watch Officer given to Naval Facility personnel. Despite being qualified for a warfare specialty and its symbols, the Navy personnel in the small SOSUS community could not do so for the sake of secrecy until the mission became public in 1991. The Ocean System commands, COMOCEANSYSLANT (COSL) and COMOCEANSYSPAC (COSP), then began to reflect their true nature as Undersea Surveillance commands COMUNDERSEASURVLANT (CUSL) and COMUNDERSEASURVPAC (CUSP) under the Integrated Undersea Surveillance System (IUSS) name that had come into effect in 1985 as systems other than fixed emerged.

SOSUS was closely held on a strict need-to-know basis that was close to Sensitive Compartmented Information even though it was classified at the Secret level. Even the Fleet had little knowledge of the system or its function. Contact data reaching the fleet was in a strictly formatted message designated RAINFORM, hiding the source, that the fleet often did not understand without reference to publications to understand the form's fields and codes. As a result, people in the fleet often did not know of the system's dedicated antisubmarine mission. Even when they knew they often did not know of its actual performance or exact role. This later had implications as the Cold War ended and budgets became an issue. In the late 1980s and early 1990s, the system was opened to tactical use and the fleet began to see the contact information in other formats readily understandable by fleet antisubmarine forces. In 1997 the RAINFORM was abandoned and replaced.

For much of the system's operation, direct action based on SOSUS contacts was avoided. An example was subject to a box piece in the January 5, 1981 issue of Newsweek titled "A Soviet War of Nerves" concerning an incident from August 1978. An alert to Atlantic Fleet, Strategic Air Command (SAC) and the Pentagon came from "underwater listening devices at several secret Navy installations" that two Yankee class nuclear-armed submarines had left their usual patrol areas 1,200 miles out in the Atlantic and were getting dangerously close. That approach raised the threat level to several SAC bases along the coast. Rather than prosecute the contacts and reveal how closely the system could track the submarines, the SAC bases put more bombers on ready alert assuming the Soviets would notice. The submarines did not withdraw so SAC dispersed the bombers to bases as far away as Texas. Though there is no positive proof that action was the cause, the Yankees moved back to their usual areas and had not moved close to the U.S. coast again at the time of the piece.

NAVFAC Nantucket showing Terminal building as internal security area

The original Naval Facilities and later, consolidated, processing centers were high security installations characterized by an outer security fence and gate checkpoint. The terminal buildings within were double fenced with separate entry security. Not all personnel assigned to the facility had access to the operational part of the installations. The early arrangement can be seen in the vertical photograph of Naval Facility Nantucket and later in the photograph of Naval Facility Brawdy below. Equipment in the terminal buildings was installed by specially cleared Western Electric Company personnel.

=== Initial installations ===
Western Electric and ONR representatives met on 29 October 1950 to draft a contract that was signed as a letter contract on 13 November to build a demonstration system. The contract was managed by Bureau of Ships (BuShips) with then Ensign Joseph P. Kelly, later Captain and termed "Father of SOSUS," assigned. An experimental six-element hydrophone array was installed on the island of Eleuthera in the Bahamas during 1951. Meanwhile, Project Jezebel and Project Michael focused on studying long range acoustics in the ocean.

From 2–19 January 1952 the British cable layer Alert installed the first full sized, 1,000 ft (304.8 m) long, forty transducer element operational array in 240 fathoms (1,440.0 ft; 438.9 m) off Eleuthera in the Bahamas. (Note: Her Majesty's Telegraph Ship, H.M.T.S. Alert, was a British General Post Office cable layer built in 1915.) Successful tests with a target submarine resulted in the order to install a total of nine arrays along the coast of the Western North Atlantic. The 1960 secret, limited distribution Navy film Watch in the Sea, contains a segment at about 9:22 minutes into the film concerning the search for a suitable array location and laying the array. It describes the operational arrays as being 1,800 ft (548.6 m) long. In 1954 ten additional arrays were ordered with three more in the Atlantic, six on the Pacific coast and one in Hawaii.

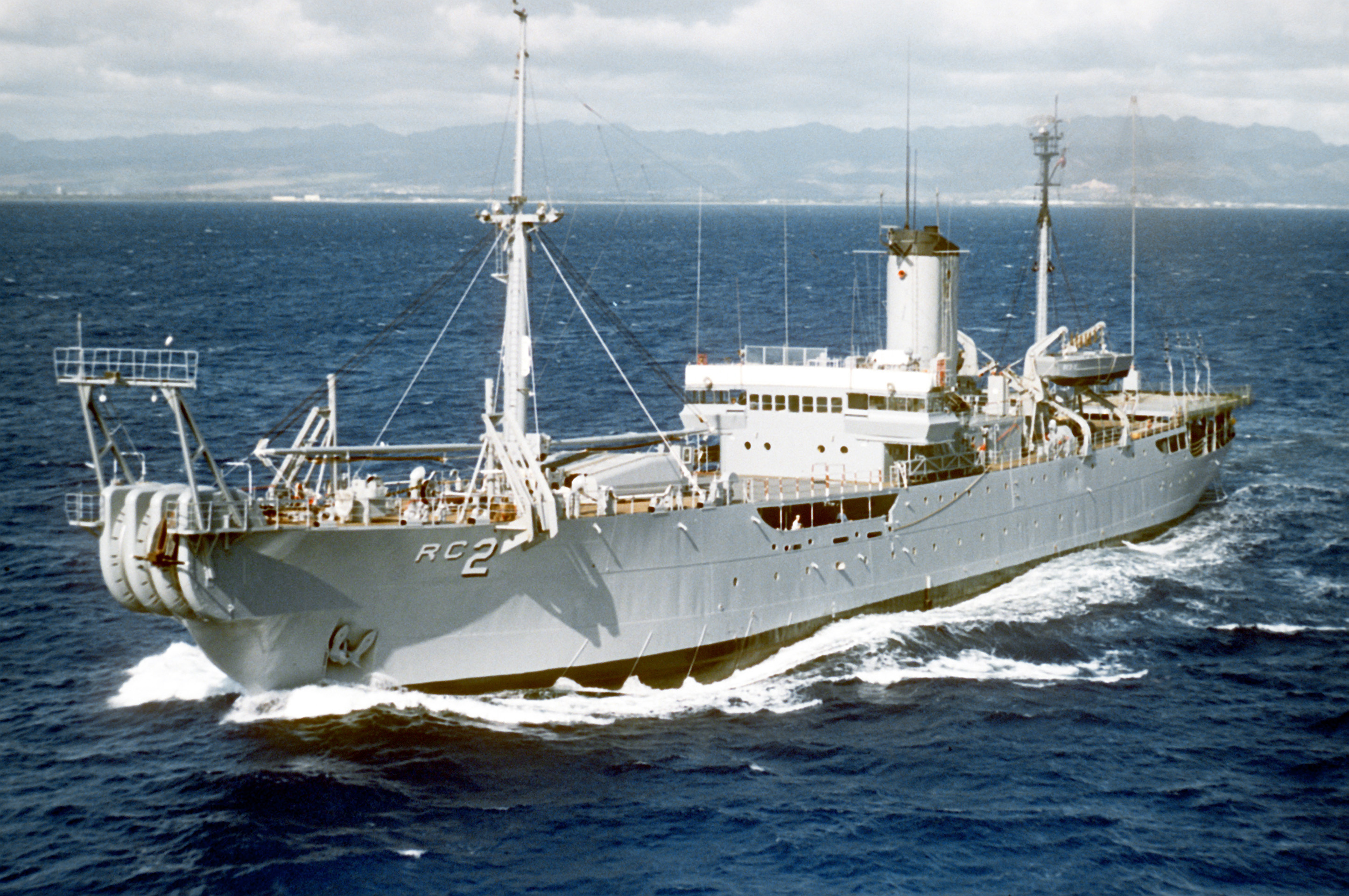
USNS Neptune (ARC-2), first cable repair ship formally assigned to Project Caesar

The cable ships Neptune and Albert J. Myer were acquired to support Project Caesar with later addition of the cable ships Aeolus and Thor. Other ships were added for acoustic and bathymetric surveys and cable support.

== Operational systems ==
SOSUS systems consisted of bottom-mounted hydrophone arrays connected by underwater cables to facilities ashore. The individual arrays were installed primarily on continental slopes and seamounts at the axis of the deep sound channel and normal to the direction in which they were to cover. The combination of location within the ocean and the sensitivity of arrays allowed the system to detect acoustic power of less than a single watt at ranges of several hundred kilometres. SOSUS shore terminal processing stations were designated with the vague, generic name of Naval Facility (NAVFAC). By the 1980s improved communications technology allowed the array data once processed in individual Naval Facilities to be sent to central processing centers (Naval Ocean Processing Facility (NOPF)) for centralized processing of multiple fixed and mobile array information.

The first systems were limited by the commercial telephone cable technology for the application requiring a shore facility within about 150 nmi (170 mi; 280 km) from the array and thus within that distance from the continental shelf locations suitable for the array. The cable of the time consisted of multi-pair wire connected to the forty hydrophones of the array. New coaxial multiplexed commercial telephone system cable, designated SB, using a single wire for all hydrophones allowed major changes with the prototype installed in 1962 at Eleuthera. (Note: The Hampton Roads Naval Museum has a photo of Project Caesar cables].) The upgrades made possible by the multiplexed coaxial cable were designated Caesar Phase III. Caesar Phase IV was associated with major upgrades in shore processing with Digital Spectrum Analysis (DSA) backfits at the stations replacing original equipment during the late 1960s. In September 1972 a third generation coaxial cable, again based on commercial developments at Bell Labs and designated SD-C, was installed for the system terminating at Naval Facility Centerville Beach, California. The SD-C cable was the basis for a fourth generation of sonar sets with installation of the Lightweight Undersea Components (LUSC) involving new shore equipment in 1984. In June 1994 an entirely new cable system was introduced with fiber optic cable.

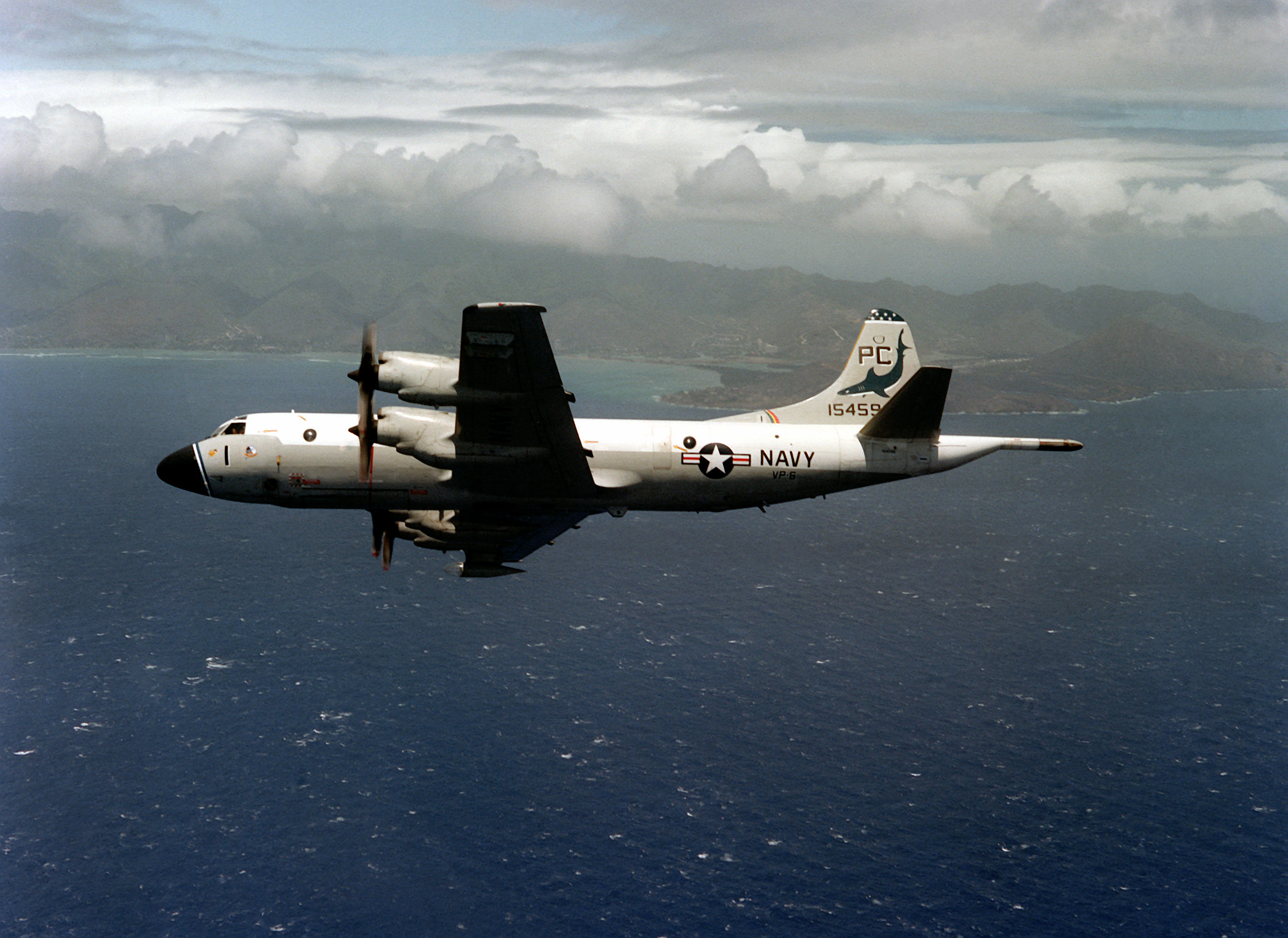
Lockheed P-3B of Patrol Squadron 6 (VP-6)

Cable technology and signal processing improved and upgrades were made to the original installations. Cable technology made it possible to site arrays further from shore into the ocean basins. New signal processing capabilities allowed for innovations such as the split array in which a single line array was divided into segments, each separately processed, then electronically recombined to form narrower beams for better bearing and cross fixes between arrays. Augmenting these local improvements was the increased central processing in centers that eventually became the Naval Oceanographic Processing Facilities. There the contacts of multiple arrays were correlated with other intelligence sources in order to cue and provide the search area for air and surface antisubmarine assets to localize and prosecute.

The system was considered a strategic, not tactical, system at the time and part of continental defense. In military construction hearings during 1964 before the Senate Committee on Armed Services the request for funding of recreational and other support buildings for the Naval Facility Cape Hatteras the Navy noted it was part of a program supporting continental air and missile defense forces without mention of its role in tracking Soviet missile submarines.

=== Chronology ===
==== 1950s ====
In 1954 the Fleet Sonar School at Key West established a Sound Search Course for training personnel. The highly classified program was behind the "Green Door" which became a name for the program itself as well as being seen as a term for the secrecy.

NAVFAC Cape May (1955-1962) Terminal Building on WWII Coast Artillery bunker before storm damage forced move to Fort Miles in Delaware where it became NAVFAC Lewes.

In 1954 three full systems to include a NAVFAC terminus were installed with arrays terminating at NAVFACs at Ramey Air Force Base, Puerto Rico in September, Grand Turk in October, and San Salvador in December. (Note: For details on locations, including photographs, see "Past IUSS Sites") Systems terminating at Naval Facility Bermuda, Canadian Forces Station (CFS) Shelburne, Nova Scotia, Nantucket, and Cape May were installed during 1955. Systems terminating at Naval Facility Cape Hatteras and Naval Facility Antigua and two Evaluation Centers, forerunners of NOPFs, were established in New York and Norfolk during 1956. The initial array at Eleuthera got a fully functioning NAVFAC with an additional system for the Atlantic at Barbados and the first of the Pacific systems at San Nicolas Island came in 1957. During 1958 the remainder of the Pacific stations at Naval Facility Point Sur and Centerville Beach in California and Pacific Beach, Washington, and Coos Head near Coos Bay, Oregon were installed.

Six Pacific coast systems had been planned but only five Naval Facilities were constructed. The northernmost system off Vancouver Island was to terminate in Canada but a change in government there precluded a facility in Canada at the time. The sixth array, requiring redesign of the cable and repeater system, was thus terminated at Naval Facility Pacific Beach, making it a dual array facility.

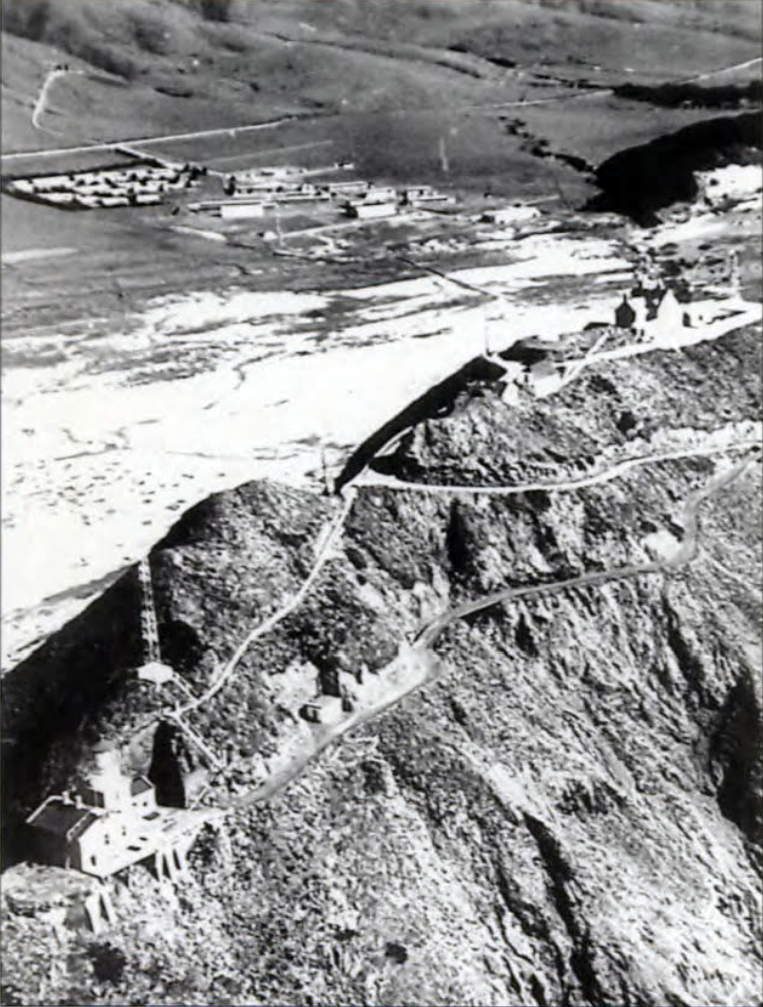
Point Sur Lightstation and in background NAVFAC Point Sur (1969)

From 1958 to 1960 Project Caesar assets began work installing the Missile Impact Location System (MILS), based on technology and installation methods similar to those for SOSUS, in support of Air Force ICBM tests. The survey and installation focus in that period was on installation of MILS in the Atlantic and Pacific test ranges. (Note: The similarity is seen in the 1962 Bell Telephone System advertisement "How the ocean grew 'ears' to pinpoint missile shots".) Arrays of hydrophones placed around the target area located the missile warhead by means of measuring arrival times of the explosion at the various hydrophones of a SOFAR charge in the test warhead. During that period an atypical SOSUS system was installed in 1959 at Argentia, Newfoundland to provide surveillance for approaches to Hudson Bay. It was a shallow water, curved array with ten eight-element arrays installed on two cables with each cable having the capacity for the usual forty elements.

==== 1960s ====
In 1962 a new system was installed terminating at Naval Facility Adak in the Aleutians. The system terminating at Cape May was rerouted to a new Naval Facility Lewes, Delaware, with upgraded processing, after the NAVFAC Cape May had been destroyed in the "Ash Wednesday" Storm. (Note: The web page A Century of Service: The U.S. Navy on Cape Henlopen has a detailed description with photos and illustrations of this NAVFAC and the cable and array locations. The original phonetic name for the system was GEORGE. The photo of a cross section of the old 21 quad cable is of particular interest.)

NAVFAC Argentia got a 2X20 element array in 1963. A 1965 decision to deploy systems to the Norwegian Sea was followed in 1966 with a system terminating at Keflavik, Iceland with the first 3X16 array system while Western Electric installed data links by land line to OCEANSYSLANT and OCEANSYSPAC. New systems were installed during 1968 at Midway Island and Guam. COMOCEANSYSPAC relocated to Ford Island, Hawaii from Treasure Island, California. The shallow water system at Argentia was deactivated.

In 1965 Flyer was acquired as a bathymetric survey ship. The satellite communications ship Kingsport joined the project in 1967 for acoustic and bathymetric work.

==== 1970s ====
The first NAVFAC decommissioning took place with the isolated duty station at NAVFAC San Salvador, Bahamas shut down on 31 January 1970. The old station is now home of the Gerace Research Center. NAVFAC Barbers Point is commissioned. A system wide modernization began in 1972. Argentia became a joint Canadian Forces and U.S. Navy facility. NAVFAC Ramey becomes NAVFAC Punta Borinquen in 1974. Further NAVFACs shut down in 1976 with NAVFACs Punta Borinquen and Nantucket decommissioned. NAVFAC Barbados was decommissioned in 1979.

Naval Facility Brawdy, Wales, the first "super NAVFAC" to be established

In 1974 Naval Facility Brawdy, Wales was established as the terminus of new arrays covering the eastern Atlantic. NAVFAC Brawdy became the first "super NAVFAC" with some four hundred U.S. and U.K. military and civilian personnel assigned. (Note: The Naval Ocean Processing Facility (NOPF) appears to be a "super NAVFAC" with processing of multiple array data, often by joint allied forces. Naval Ocean Processing Facility (NOPF), Dam Neck, Virginia, in 1980 with Western Atlantic consolidation was the first of the NOPFs to be so named. With closure of NAVFAC Brawdy and its array data remoted to Joint Maritime Facility (JMF), St Mawgan the later Integrated Undersea Surveillance System character of the consolidated, joint centers was achieved. Ultimately that JMF itself was "remoted" across the Atlantic to Dam Neck.) The facility (51°52′15.3″N 005°08′13.8″W) was adjacent to the Royal Air Force Station Brawdy which had returned to RAF control during February 1974 after closure in 1971.

In 1975 Mizar left Naval Research Laboratory service and joined Project Caesar. In April 1974 the ship was reported as already being funded by Naval Electronics Systems Command (NAVELEX), where the project program management resided, and no longer funded as an oceanographic ship. By 1979 it was the most recently built ship of the five project ships that then included cable repair ships Albert J. Myer and Neptune due for modernization and the larger repair ship Aeolus that was uneconomical to repair and marginal as a cable ship. (Note: Both Aeolus and Thor had been conversions from Artemis class AKA types of unusually shallow draft. Cable ships were designed for deep draft with high capacity cable tank storage and ability to maintain station during stopped or low speed repair operations in poor weather. The AKA conversions could not carry a full cable load and full fuel load without exceeding maximum draft. A major deficiency for a modern cable laying ship, rather than dedicated repair ship, was lack of stern laying capability. Neither of the larger repair ships could be modified for that. On some operations, they had to be towed from astern by a tug in order to lay cable over the bow sheaves using cable machinery forward. They even had dual sets of running lights installed so the stern could be the bow and show proper lights.) Kingsport was still with the project. The Navy was requesting four fully functional cable ships, the modernized Albert J. Myer and Neptune and two large new ships. The two new ships were to be designed as modern cable ships, fully capable of cable and survey work.

==== 1980s ====
In 1980 consolidation and elimination of expensive individual facilities was made possible by the Wideband Acoustic Data Relay (WADR) first installed at Midway Island in January 1982 so that the two Midway arrays could eventually be remoted directly to NOPF Ford Island. This first generation WADR was used to consolidate array data from the California facilities at San Nicolas Island and Point Sur in 1984. Those were followed by remoting Hawaii's Barber's Point in 1985, the Pacific Northwest arrays at Pacific Beach and Coos Head in 1987, and Bermuda in the Atlantic in 1992. A second generation WADR allowed the consolidation of the Aleutian station at Adak in 1993, the North Atlantic's Argentia in 1995, and those termed "Special Projects" in 1997 and 1998.

The western Atlantic system consolidation was centered on the establishment of the Naval Ocean Processing Facility (NOPF) at Dam Neck, Virginia beginning with closure of NAVFACs Eleuthera and Grand Turk. During 1981 Naval Ocean Processing Facility (NOPF), Ford Island became operational and the decommissioning of NAVFAC Midway with that system's data routed to NAVFAC Barbers Point was completed. NAVFAC Lewes, Delaware closed that year. NAVFAC Cape Hatteras closed in 1982 and in 1983 Midway acoustic data was rerouted directly to Naval Ocean Processing Facility, Ford Island.

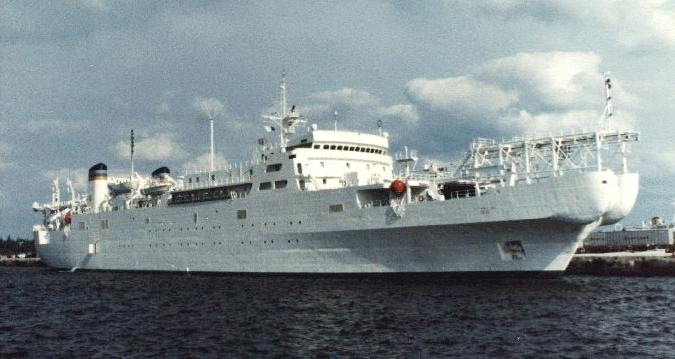
USNS Zeus

In 1984 the first SURTASS vessel, USNS Stalwart (T-AGOS-1) arrives at Little Creek, Virginia. USNS Zeus (T-ARC-7), the one new cable ship of the requested two, enters the "Caesar fleet" for operations. Atlantic NAVFAC Antigua and Pacific NAVFACs at San Nicolas Island and Point Sur in California closed. Point Sur acoustic data was routed to NAVFAC Centerville. Consolidation and new systems brought further change in 1985. NAVFAC Barbers Point closes with acoustic data directed to NOPF, Ford Island. The Fixed Distributed System (FDS) test array, a new type of fixed bottom system, terminus was made at NAVFAC Brawdy, Wales. Stalwart makes first SURTASS operational patrol and system name is changed from SOSUS to Integrated Undersea Surveillance System (IUSS). Consolidation continued in 1987 with NAVFAC Whidbey Island, Washington, established with NAVFAC Pacific Beach's acoustic data routed to that facility. During 1991 NAVFAC Guam, Mariana Islands closed.

==== 1990s ====
USNS Stalwart and USNS Worthy (T-AGOS-14) monohull SURTASS ships were withdrawn with SWATH hull USNS Victorious (T-AGOS-19) accepted by the Navy during 1992. That year the system got Chief of Naval Operations tasking to report whale detections.

More original NAVFACs closed during 1993 with NAVFACs Centerville Beach, California and Adak, Alaska closing with their acoustic data routed to NAVFAC Whidbey Island. The facility at Whidbey, with multiple systems terminating there became Naval Ocean Processing Facility (NOPF) Whidbey. During 1994 Canadian Forces Shelburne, Nova Scotia closes as does NAVFAC Argentia with HMCS Trinity established at Halifax Nova Scotia with operation as Canadian Forces IUSS Centre (CFIC). NAVFAC Bermuda data is routed to Naval Ocean Processing Facility (NOPF) at Dam Neck. The new Advanced Deployable System enters as a part of IUSS and NAVFAC Brawdy, Wales closes with equipment and operation transferred to Joint Maritime Facility St Mawgan during 1995. During 1996 NAVFAC Keflavik Iceland closes and the new Fixed Distributed System Initial Operational Capability is accomplished. In 1997 the Adak system reverts to "wet storage."

==== 2000 to 2010 ====
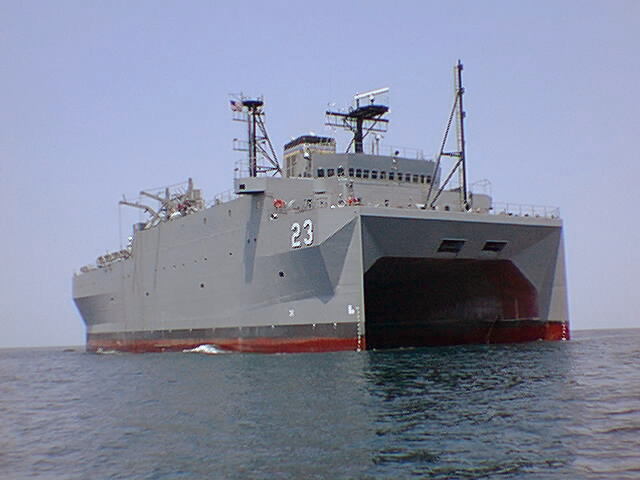
USNS Impeccable, a SWATH design, for SURTASS/LFA operations

USNS Impeccable (T-AGOS-23) is commissioned as the first SURTASS/Low Frequency Active (LFA) surveillance ship in 2000. In 2003 the new Advanced Deployable System (ADS) completes dual array testing. Extensive changes both with shore and sea assets take place over the following years as post Cold War missions change and systems are applied in new ways. Further consolidation takes place such as in 2009 when Joint Maritime Facility, St. Mawgan in the U.K. has data remoted directly to NOPF Dam Neck and is decommissioned. British and US Forces then begin joint, combined operations at NOPF Dam Neck.

=== Management and commands ===
Project Caesar, from initial bathymetric and acoustical surveys through cable installation and turnover to operations, was managed by Bureau of Ships (BuShips) from 1951 until 1964. All the direct support through contracts with Western Electric, Bell Labs and ship schedules was under this management. In 1964 the project was placed under Industrial Manager, Potomac River Command and then Naval District Washington in 1965. In 1966 the project came under Naval Electronics Systems Command (NAVELEX PME-124) where it remained through the name change in 1986 to Space and Naval Warfare Systems Command (SPAWARSYSCOM PMW 180) (Note: PME-124 and PMW-180 were the program manager's office designations. Name changed in June 2019 to Naval Information Warfare Systems Command.) and a move from Arlington to San Diego in 1997.

The Navy operational side, taking over when the systems were accepted and turned over for operation, came under Commander, Oceanographic System Atlantic (COMOCEANSYSLANT) in 1954. Commander, Oceanographic System Pacific (COMOCEANSYSPAC) was established for the Pacific systems in 1964. Within the Office of Chief of Naval Operations the Director ASW Programs OP-95 was established in 1964. In 1970 COMOCEANSYSLANT and COMOCEANSYSPAC were designated as major commands by the Chief of Naval Operations.

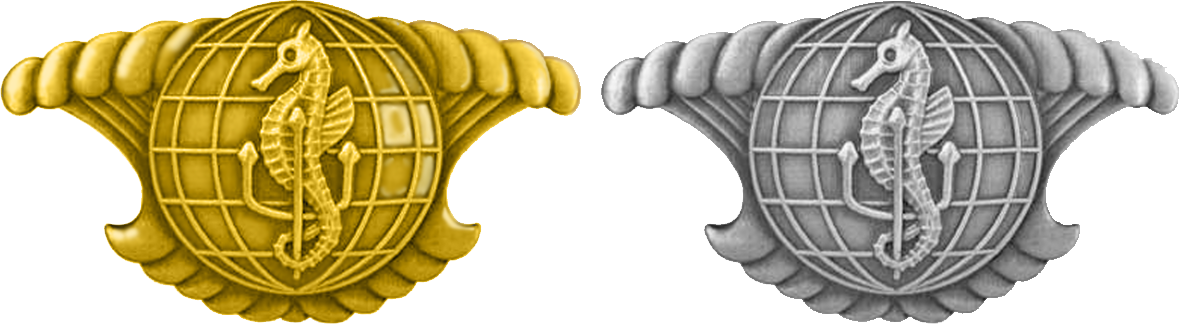
Officer and enlisted IUSS insignia

With the new, mobile systems Towed Array Sensor System (TASS) and the Surveillance Towed Array Sensor System (SURTASS) entering the system, the SOSUS name was changed in 1984 to Integrated Undersea Surveillance System (IUSS) to reflect the change from bottom fixed systems alone. In 1990 officers were authorized to wear IUSS insignia. Finally, with "undersea surveillance" so openly displayed, the mission is declassified in 1991 and the commands reflect that with replacement of the "oceanographic systems" with the accurate "under sea surveillance," the commands renamed as Commander, Undersea Surveillance Atlantic and Commander, Undersea Surveillance Pacific. In 1994 the Atlantic and Pacific commands were merged into Commander Undersea Surveillance at Dam Neck, Virginia. In 1998 that command was placed under Commander, Submarine Force, U.S. Atlantic Fleet.

The LOFARgram representation of acoustics in black, gray and white with an operator trained and adapted to interpreting that display was the critical link in the system. Experienced operators that could detect subtle differences and with practice could detect faint signatures of targets were vital to detection. It was even found that color blindness could be an advantage. It was soon apparent that the Navy's practice of short term tours and transfer out of the system was a problem. Commander Ocean Systems Atlantic launched an effort in 1964 to create a rating peculiar to SOSUS and allow personnel to remain within the community. It took five years for Bureau of Personnel to create the rating of Ocean Technician [OT]. That bureau did not do the same for officers thus forcing those with experience to either leave for new duties or leave the Navy. Some did so and remained in the system as civil service or contractor personnel.

The first women were assigned to NAVFAC Eleuthera when an officer and ten enlisted women were assigned in 1972. Due to the fact that the SOSUS community departed from the usual Navy cultural routine, with repeat assignments within the small community, women were able to serve in a warfare specialty without shipboard duty that was still being denied. That opened a new field for women outside the usual medical, education, or administrative specialties. SOSUS assignment qualified as important as sea duty on a Cold War front line.

=== Events ===
In 1961 the system proved its effectiveness when it tracked USS George Washington on her first North Atlantic transit to the United Kingdom. The first detection of a Soviet nuclear submarine occurred on 6 July 1962 when NAVFAC Barbados recognized and reported contact #27103, a Soviet nuclear submarine west of Norway coming into the Atlantic through the Greenland-Iceland-United Kingdom (GIUK) gap.

When USS Thresher sank in 1963, SOSUS helped determine its location.

In 1968, the first detections of Victor and Charlie class Soviet submarines were made, while in 1974 the first Delta-class submarine was observed.

Also in 1968, SOSUS played a key role in locating the wreckage of the American nuclear attack submarine USS Scorpion, lost near the Azores in May.

Moreover, SOSUS data from March 1968 facilitated the discovery, and clandestine retrieval six years later, of parts of the Soviet Golf II-class ballistic missile submarine K-129, that foundered that month north of Hawaii.

=== Operational issues ===
The secrecy of the system meant that it did not have the widespread fleet support of successful tactical systems despite its actual success. It was the primary cuing system that antisubmarine forces used to localize and potentially destroy targets for over forty years, but secrecy largely kept that fact from the fleet. The lack of strong fleet support was a factor when budget cuts after the Cold War fell heavily on the surveillance program.

The system's first station came on line before there was any signature library of Soviet submarine acoustic characteristics while submerged. The operators had no information on which to identify a hostile submerged submarine's unique signature while snorkeling on the LOFARgram. The signatures available were of surfaced submarines from other sources. It was not until the Cuban Missile Crisis in 1962, when the quarantine reduced other shipping noises, that operators recognized unusual signatures that were confirmed to be Soviet snorkeling submarines when aircraft sighted snorkels and sonobuoys confirmed the unusual acoustics as being from that submarine. Even then, others had doubts until 1963–1964 Norwegian data on submarines deploying or returning collected correlated signatures. SOSUS then became the major collector of Soviet submarine signatures and "bootstrapped" itself to becoming the primary signature library for itself and becoming the major intelligence source for all other Navy acoustic sensor systems.

Both undersea surveillance and the operation of U.S. submarines were tightly held secrets within the communities. That secrecy led to misunderstandings and even potential breaches of security. Despite periods of realization both communities fell back into assumptions as a result of secrecy. On the submarine force side, there was a recurrent idea that SOSUS/IUSS could not detect U.S. submarines, despite early SOSUS having tracked USS George Washington across the Atlantic. The realization that SOSUS could detect U.S. nuclear submarines led to the Navy's quieting program for those submarines and the assumption returned.

The opposite occurred when the surveillance community did not have information on U.S. submarine operations, and assumed they held a Soviet or unknown contact. In 1962 and 1973, U.S. submarines conducting covert operations off of the Soviet submarine base at Petropavlovsk were detected by NAVFAC Adak. In 1962, the detections were published at the secret level by Commander, Alaskan Sea Frontier, and these reports were pushed up the chain of command. Commander, Submarine Force, U.S. Pacific Fleet (COMSUBPAC) recognized the contacts as U.S. submarines engaged in highly classified operations, and immediate changes were ordered for the reporting procedures. In 1973 such contacts were again almost published, but were stopped only when information was identified by a visiting civilian expert who recognized the acoustic signatures as that of a U.S. submarine. When that submarine put into Adak for a medical emergency the detection events were matched to the submarine's logs, ending the disbelief the "Soviet" contact was actually a U.S. submarine.

== "Caesar fleet" ==
Other ships are mentioned as having "cameo" appearances and the project apparently made use of other Navy survey and civilian cable ships on occasion. The core fleet appears to be those listed below.

Cable ships:

- Aeolus
- Albert J. Myer
- Neptune
- Thor
- Zeus

Other:

- Flyer
- Arthur M. Huddell
- Kingsport
- Mizar

== Espionage ==
In 1988, Stephen Joseph Ratkai, a Hungarian-Canadian recruited by Soviet Intelligence, was arrested, charged and convicted in St. John's, Newfoundland for attempting to obtain information on the SOSUS site at Naval Station Argentia. John Anthony Walker, a US Navy Chief Warrant Officer and communications specialist, divulged SOSUS operational information to the Soviet Union during the Cold War which compromised its effectiveness.

== Post-Cold War ==
By 1998 cable technology and shore processing allowed consolidation of shore stations to a few central processing facilities. Changes in Soviet operations, few hostile nuclear submarines at sea and the ending of the Cold War in the 1990s meant the need to maintain IUSS/SOSUS at full capability decreased. The focus of the US Navy also turned toward a new fixed system, the Fixed Distributed System, and systems deployable on a theater basis such as the Surveillance Towed Array Sensor System and Advanced Deployable System. Although officially declassified in 1991, by that time IUSS and SOSUS had long been an open secret.

=== Civilian science applications ===
Alternate or dual-use partnerships exist with a number of agencies and institutions. The Applied Physics Laboratory, University of Washington has used the system for Ocean Acoustic Tomography.

National Oceanic and Atmospheric Administration (NOAA) Vents program at its Pacific Marine Environmental Laboratory was granted access to the system at the Naval Ocean Processing Facility at Whidbey Island in October 1990 to combine raw analog data from specific hydrophones with NOAA systems for continuous monitoring of the northeast Pacific Ocean for low-level seismic activity and detection of volcanic activity along the northeast Pacific spreading centers.

Woods Hole Oceanographic Institution detected and tracked a lone whale with a unique call over a period of years in the Pacific.

Texas Applied Research Laboratories, and several other organizations have used the system for research.

== Associated systems ==
=== Colossus ===
Jezebel research had developed an additional short range, high frequency, upward-looking system using active transducers for direct plotting of ships passing over the array. Colossus was intended to be installed in narrows and straits.

=== Artemis ===
Artemis was an experiment with a large active source. It was not a part of the SOSUS development. The system used very large towers and unwieldy components while SOSUS provided more than adequate warning and coverage and thus the system did not come into operation. The word Artemis had been used as a code word in the first days before Jezebel, Michael and Caesar as an unclassified name. Artemis, goddess of the hunt, stood for those cleared for Frederick V. Hunt and his idea of a passive system like SOSUS in his May 1950 report. That old application of Artemis caused some confusion.

== See also ==
- Communication with submarines
- Integrated Undersea Surveillance System insignia
- SOFAR channel
- Missile Impact Location System
- Project Artemis
- Gordon Eugene Martin, Navy physicist and executive officer of the prototype SOSUS station
