= Low Frequency Analyzer and Recorder =

Lofargram produced by SOSUS LOFAR equipment.

Low Frequency Analyzer and Recorder and Low Frequency Analysis and Recording (LOFAR) are the equipment and process respectively for presenting a visual spectrum representation of low frequency sounds in a time–frequency analysis. The process was originally applied to fixed surveillance passive antisubmarine sonar systems and later to sonobuoy and other systems. Originally the analysis was electromechanical and the display was produced on electrostatic recording paper, a Lofargram, with stronger frequencies presented as lines against background noise. The analysis migrated to digital and both analysis and display were digital after a major system consolidation into centralized processing centers during the 1990s.

Both the equipment and process had specific and classified application to fixed surveillance sonar systems and was the basis for the United States Navy's ocean wide Sound Surveillance System (SOSUS) established in the early 1950s. The research and development of systems utilizing LOFAR was given the code name Project Jezebel. The installation and maintenance of SOSUS was under the unclassified code name Project Caesar. The principle was later applied to air, surface and submarine tactical sonar systems with some incorporating the name "Jezebel".

== Origin ==
In 1949 when the US Navy approached the Committee for Undersea Warfare, an academic advisory group formed in 1946 under the National Academy of Sciences, to research antisubmarine warfare. As a result, the Navy formed a study group designated Project Hartwell under Massachusetts Institute of Technology (MIT) leadership. The Hartwell panel recommended that spending of US$10,000,000 (equivalent to $135,310,000 in 2025) annually to develop systems to counter the Soviet submarine threat consisting primarily of a large fleet of diesel submarines. One recommendation was a system to monitor low-frequency sound in the SOFAR channel using multiple listening sites equipped with hydrophones and a processing facility that could calculate submarine positions over hundreds of miles. (Note: The cited Project HARTWELL report first links arrays with fleet type submarines towing such an array in the Greenland-Iceland-UK Gap then refers to potential exploitation of the deep sound channel low frequency sounds.)

The Office of Naval Research (ONR) then contracted with American Telephone and Telegraph Company (AT&T), with its Bell Laboratories research and Western Electric manufacturing elements, to develop a long range, passive detection system, based on bottom arrays of hydrophones. The proposed development was based on AT&T's sound spectrograph, which converted sound into a visual spectrogram representing a time–frequency analysis of sound that was developed for speech analysis and modified to analyze low-frequency underwater sounds. The proposed system offered such promise of long-range submarine detection that the Navy ordered immediate moves for implementation.

== Application to undersea surveillance ==
A working model of the Low Frequency Analyzer and Recorder was delivered in May 1951 which operated with real time analysis of a frequency band of 1 to 1/2 Hz. Along with the working model was a proposal for hydrophones, cables, processing systems and beamforming so that a hydrophone array could present multiple azimuthal beams to be displayed.

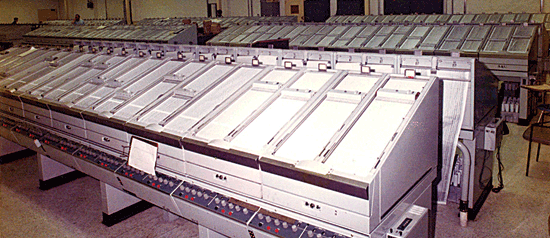
Lofargram writers, one for each array beam, on a NAVFAC watch floor.

Each system, from shore facility to the transducer array was a sonar set with the signal processing beginning as the array's signals were amplified, processed into beams by time delay and each beam processed by an electromechanical spectrum analyzer with the display being a sweep of the frequency spectrum's intensity burned across electrostatic recording paper moving on the time axis.

The sweeps of the stylus recording the intensity of sound along the frequency axis formed a time record of background noise and specific frequency receptions that formed lines. When representing frequencies generated by propeller blades or machinery those could form a submarine or surface ship signature that could be recognized and used to locate and identify the source. The frequency against time line can show frequency variations from a specific source and thus changes in behavior of the source. With regard to vessels that could be speed or other changes, including a Doppler shift indicating direction changes, having an effect of frequencies received. (Note: The lofargram illustration at the top illustrates such a distinctive frequency shift in a line.)

After successful tests with a U.S. submarine using a test array at Eleuthera the Navy ordered six LOFAR systems for installation. The shore stations where the operational array and cable, composing a surveillance sonar set, terminated, were given the generic and non revealing term Naval Facilitity (NAVFAC). The watch floor of a NAVFAC had banks of displays, one for each beam of the array.

The first phase of installations was largely complete during the years 1954 and 1958. A system wide signal processing upgrade began in September 1963 in which the electromechanical analyzer was replaced by digital spectrum analysis with an upgrade of the display recorders. The spectrum analysis system was further upgraded with systems retrofitted between 1966 and 1967. A new system installed in 1973 began a general upgrade to full digital signal analysis that continued into 1981. That system, using a high capacity digital computer, fully digitized the spectrum analysis and had some automatic detection of acoustic signatures. The system of electrostatic displays was not replaced by digital displays until the 1990s consolidation of the array systems terminating at individual Naval Facilities being routed into central processing facilities.

== Other antisubmarine warfare applications ==
A parallel research and development effort to explore applications was given the name Project Jezebel. The origin of the project name was explained by Dr. Robert Frosch to Senator Stennis during a 1968 hearing. It was because of the low frequencies, "about the A below middle C on the piano" (about 100-150 cycles) and "Jezebel" being chosen because "she was of low character."

Jezebel and LOFAR branched into the localization of submarines with the AN/SSQ-28 passive omnidirectional Jezebel-LOFAR sonobuoy introduced in 1956 for use by the air antisubmarine forces. That sonobuoy gave the aircraft cued by SOSUS access to the same low frequency and LOFAR capability as SOSUS. Bell Telephone Laboratories time delay correlation was used to fix target position with two or more sonobuoys in a technique named COrrelation Detection And Ranging (CODAR). This, and later specialized, sonobuoys equipped with a small explosive charge could be used in an active mode to detect the echo off the target. The active mode was named by engineers developing the technique "Julie" after a burlesque dancer whose "performance could turn passive buoys active."
