= Alaska Communications System =

Communications network in Alaska, 1900s-1960s

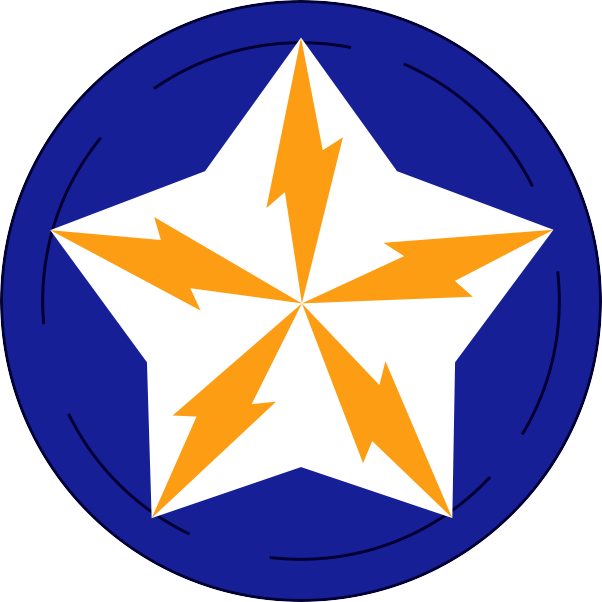
Alaska Communications Systems (US Army Signal Corps) SSI 1954-1963

The Alaska Communication System (ACS), also known as the Washington-Alaska Military Cable and Telegraph System (WAMCATS), was a system of cables and telegraph lines authorized by the U.S. Congress in 1900 and constructed by the U.S. Army Signal Corps. The communications lines were to serve both military and civilian needs in the territory of Alaska. By 1904, ACS comprised some 2,100 miles (3,400 km) of undersea cable, over 1,400 miles (2,300 km) of land lines, and a wireless segment across at least 107 miles (172 km). On 15 May 1936 WAMCATS was renamed the U.S. Army Alaska Communication System. The Alaska Communication System remained under the control of the Army Signal Corps until 1962 when it was taken over by the U.S. Air Force. The ACS handled the radioteletype, radio telephone, 500 kHz ship-to-shore frequencies, collected communications intelligence, and other services for more than half a century in Alaska.

The Army Signal Corps (which develops, tests, provides, and manages communications and information systems support for the command and control of all the U.S. armed forces) connected military posts with each other and with the rest of the continental United States. This system of thousands of miles of suspended landlines and submarine cable included the first successful long-distance radio operation in the world. The telegraph was also the first major contribution to Alaskan infrastructure provided by the U.S. federal government, marking the beginning of the government's central role in the development of Alaska.

At the start of the 20th century, when the United States was committing American troops to military engagements around the world, the Signal Corps in Alaska worked to make sure military communications could flow. An important message, such as General MacArthur's World War II demand for the surrender of the Japanese, was received, automatically recorded as printed text and parallel punched holes on paper tape, and could then be relayed on to other stations.

The ACS also provided a vital lifeline to the many remote and almost inaccessible communities across Alaska: it enabled the icebound city of Nome to alert the outside world about a diphtheria outbreak which led to the successful 1925 serum run to Nome.

== History ==
At the beginning of the 20th century, Alaska was a cold and inhospitable place where travel, let alone news, took a month or more to happen. In 1870, Alaska had just recently been sold to America by the Russian Empire. In the U.S. that year, the U.S. Army Signal Corps began to establish isolated forts (meteorological stations) throughout the Western territories. These stations were usually not much more than cold, lonely huts occupied by a single telegraph operator or soldier.

In 1900 the Congress appropriated nearly a half a million dollars for the purpose of establishing a land and underwater communications system connecting the various military posts in Alaska with the rest of the United States.

The communications system was operated by signal soldiers assigned to the depot companies at the various forts around Alaska. WAMCATS soldiers reported directly to the Chief Signal Officer of the United States Army.

Wired telephone poles eventually were put in place in Alaska, however, they were not reliable. One of the problems was that the heavy snow and ice typical in Alaska would cause the telephone poles to fall over, breaking the connections. During the winter there might be six feet of frozen snow that could topple poles. Laying cable underwater would solve part of that problem, and would also help the military with ship to shore communications.

The first submarine telegraph cable laid by the United States Signal Corps was in the Philippines in 1899. Soon thereafter, underwater cable was first laid in Alaska in 1900, when the vessel CS Orizaba connected Unalakik to St. Michael and St. Michael to Safety Island, Cape Nome.

Between 1900 and 1905, Army soldiers of the 59th Signal Battalion (also known as the "Voice of the Arctic") constructed a telegraph line linking the U.S. Army posts across Alaska with each other, including a 107-mile (172 km) wireless system crossing Norton Sound on the west coast of Alaska. In 1903 an underwater cable between Sitka, Alaska and Seattle, Washington was laid by USAT Burnside, allowing rapid communication between Alaska and the lower continental U.S.

By 1918, the 1st Signal Service Company was activated at Valdez, Alaska and 2nd Signal Service Company at Fort Gibbon to operate WAMCATS in Alaska. The 2nd Signal Service Company was not formally inactivated until 1927.

The vessel CS Dellwood undertook the laying of a new submarine cable in 1924 between Seattle and Alaska with a post at Ketchikan.

In 1930 the Army built WVD radio station in west Seattle (Pigeon point), to communicate by wireless with Alaska stations as well as others in the Pacific.

From 1931 the Army Signal Corps did not own a cable ship and so the system deteriorated until the beginning of World War II in 1941.

The first submarine telephone cables were laid in 1956 with the Army cable ships Albert J. Myer and Basil O. Lenoir undertaking the work. The cable came ashore at around 40-mile (64 km) intervals.

The ACS was transferred to the Air Force in July 1962. RCA purchased ACS for $31.5 million in 1970.

== U.S. Army cable ships ==
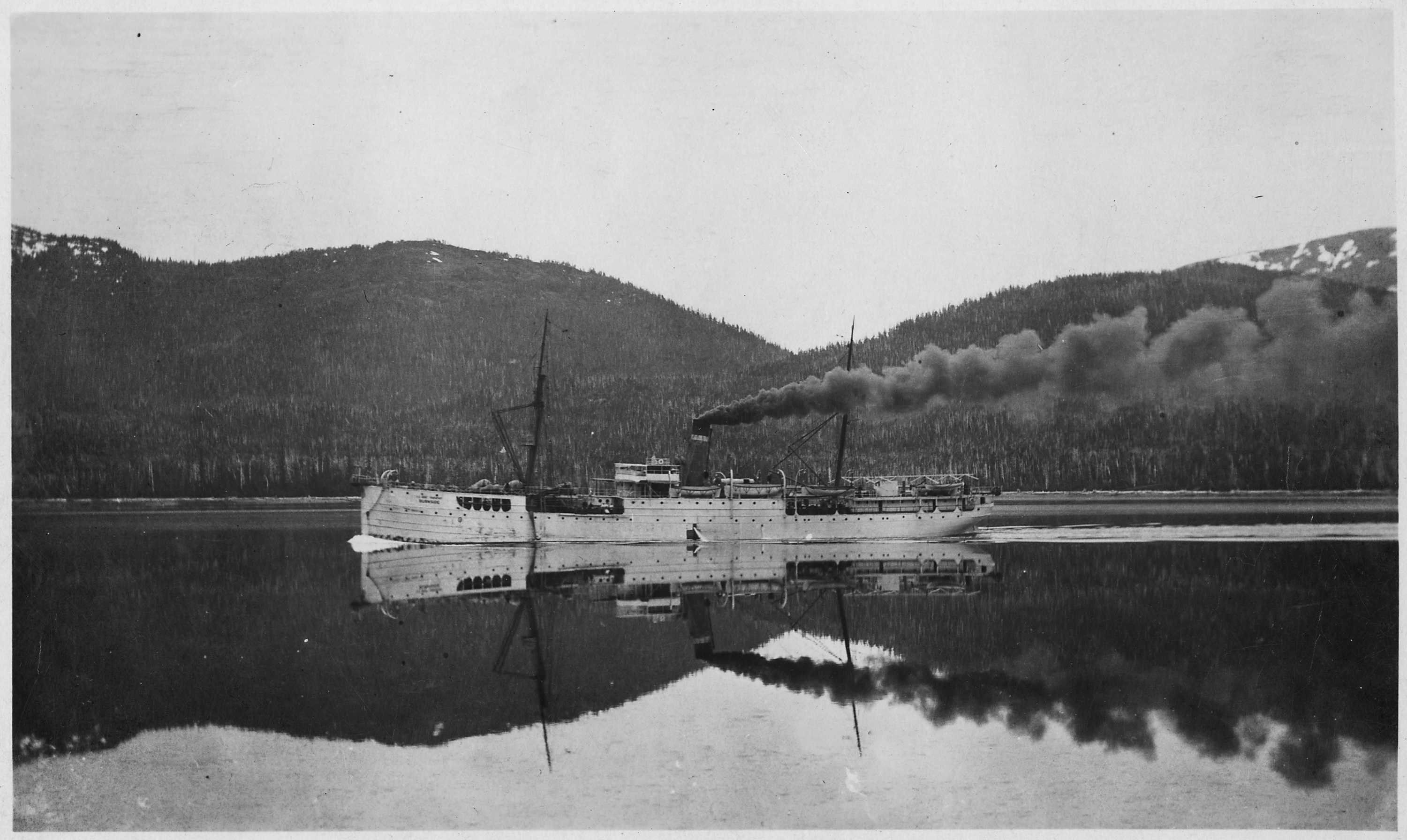
U.S. cable ship Burnside in Wright Sound

- CS Orizaba
- CS Hooker
- CS Romulus
- CS Burnside
- CS Liscum
- CS Cyrus W. Field
- CS Samuel Mills
- CS Joseph Henry
- CS Dellwood
- CS Silverado
- Col. William. A. Glassford (Note: The "prefix" USASPB associated with the vessel is an error. The Army's designation of self propelled barges was Barge, Self Propelled (BSP). Smaller vessels simply had the designation "U.S. Army" and a number without being named. Some vessels were named but also bore the usual Army identification. The use can be seen in this photo of Col. William. A. Glassford in which "U.S. Army" is followed by "B.S.P. 2008" with Glassford underneath on the hull.)
- CS Basil O. Lenoir
- CS Albert J. Myer
- USACS William H. G. Bullard
- CS Ellery W. Niles

== U.S. Navy cable ships ==
- USS Aeolus
- USS Thor
- USS Portunus
- USS Yamacraw
- SS Arthur M. Huddell

== Alaska call signs as of 1914 ==
- WVA- Circle city
- WVB- Fairbanks
- WVC- Fort Egbert
- WVD- Fort Gibbon
- WVE- Fort St, Michael
- WVF- Kotlik
- WVG- Nome
- WVH- Nulato
- WVI- Petersburg
- WVJ- Wrangell
- WVK- unassigned (later holy cross)

== See also ==
- Mount Billy Mitchell (Chugach Mountains)
