= USS Indianapolis =

Four ships of the United States Navy have been named USS Indianapolis:

- USS Indianapolis (ID-3865) was a cargo ship commissioned 12 December 1918 and decommissioned 9 July 1919.
- USS Indianapolis (CA-35) was a heavy cruiser commissioned in 1932 and sunk in July 1945.
- USS Indianapolis (SSN-697) was a Los Angeles-class attack submarine in service from 1980 to 1998.
- USS Indianapolis (LCS-17) is a Freedom-class littoral combat ship, commissioned in 2019.

== Quick notes ==
At Indianapolis Fire Department's station 35, they honor the legacy of the USS Indianapolis ships of World War ll, by making a logo that stands out differently from other IFD station logos. IFD's Ladder 35 is also dedicated to the crews of the USS Indianapolis ships.

For info about IFD Station 35 press the cite link

== See also ==
- USS Indianapolis: Men of Courage, a 2016 film starring Nicolas Cage.
