= Nashawena =

Nashawena may refer to:

- Nashawena Island, one of the Elizabeth Islands in Gosnold, Massachusetts
- USS Nashawena (AG-142), a U.S. Navy cable ship
