= USS Thor =

Cargo ship of the United States Navy

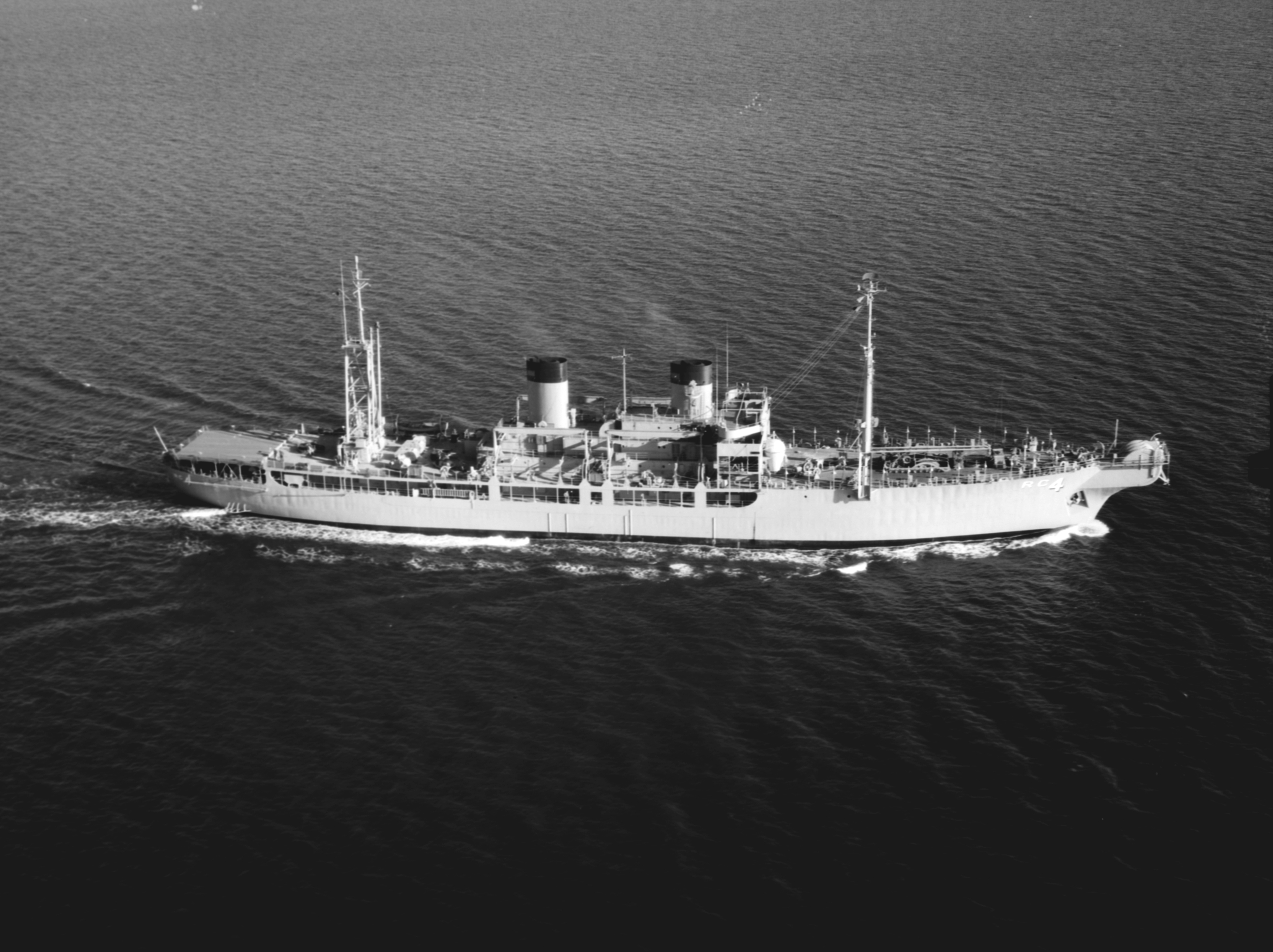
- USS Thor as a cable repair ship

History

United States
- Name: Vanadis
- Namesake: The asteroid Vanadis or Freia
- Builder: Walsh-Kaiser Company, Providence, Rhode Island
- Laid down: 18 April 1945
- Launched: 8 June 1945
- Commissioned: 9 July 1945
- Decommissioned: 27 March 1946
- Stricken: 5 June 1946
- Fate: Transferred to the Maritime Commission, 2 July 1946
- Name: Thor
- Namesake: Thor, the Norse god of thunder
- Acquired: 14 April 1955
- Recommissioned: 3 January 1956
- Decommissioned: 2 July 1973
- In service: 2 July 1973 (Military Sealift Command)
- Out of service: April 1974
- Fate: Sold for scrapping 22 September 1977

General characteristics
- Class & type: Artemis-class attack cargo ship
- Type: S4–SE2–BE1
- Displacement: 4,087 long tons (4,153 t) light; 7,080 long tons (7,194 t) full
- Length: 426 ft (130 m)
- Beam: 58 ft (18 m)
- Draft: 16 ft (4.9 m)
- Speed: 16.9 knots (31.3 km/h; 19.4 mph)
- Complement: 303 officers and enlisted
- Armament: 1 × 5"/38 caliber gun mount; 4 × twin Bofors 40 mm L/60 gun mounts; 10 × Oerlikon 20 mm cannon mounts

USS Thor was a cable repair ship that supported Project Caesar, the unclassified name for installation of the Sound Surveillance System (SOSUS). Originally the Artemis-class attack cargo ship Vanadis (AKA-49) which was briefly in commission from 9 July 1945 to 27 March 1946, it was converted in 1955 after nine years in the reserve fleet.

Thor, named after the Germanic god of thunder, was commissioned on 3 January 1956 and served in that capacity until 2 July 1973 when transferred to the Military Sealift Command (MSC) for brief operation as USNS Thor (T-ARC-4) until April 1974 when the ship was returned to the Maritime Administration for disposal. After removal of cable machinery the ship was eventually sold for scrap on 22 September 1977.

Thor was one of four Navy cable ships supporting military cable projects from the 1950s until 1984 with construction of Zeus. The others were Aeolus, the other transport conversion, and the two Army designed cable ships, the only ships in the Navy designed and built as cable ships, Albert J. Myer and Neptune which were modernized in the 1980s.

== USS Vanadis, 1945–1946 ==
Vanadis (AKA-49) was laid down on 18 April 1945 under a Maritime Commission contract (MC hull 1910) at Providence, Rhode Island, by the Walsh-Kaiser Co., Inc. and launched on 8 June 1945 sponsored by Mrs. J. Henry Gill. Like most ships of its class, the ship was named for a minor planet (asteroid), 240 Vanadis or 76 Freia (Vanadis is an alternative poetic name for Freia, the Germanic goddess of love and beauty). The Navy acquired the ship on 9 July 1945 with commissioning the same day.

Following shakedown out of Hampton Roads, Vanadis arrived at Newport, Rhode Island, on 4 August and began shuttling back and forth between that port and Hampton Roads. In mid-December, the attack cargo ship headed for the Gulf of Mexico. After visiting Mobile, Alabama; Gulfport, Mississippi; and Jacksonville, Florida, she arrived at Boston. On 6 February, she reported to the Commandant, 1st Naval District, for inactivation. Vanadis was placed out of commission on 27 March 1946. Her name was struck from the Navy List on 5 June 1946; and, on 2 July, she was transferred to the Maritime Commission.

== USS Thor ==
After almost nine years of inactivity — berthed with the National Defense Reserve Fleet at James River, Virginia — Vanadis was reacquired by the Navy on 14 April 1955 and reinstated on the Navy List as AKA-49. On 30 June, she entered the Bethlehem Steel Co.'s yard at Baltimore, Maryland, for conversion to a cable repair ship. She was redesignated ARC-4 and renamed Thor on 14 November 1955. On 3 January 1956, Thor completed her conversion and was recommissioned. Thor was converted to support the installation of the Sound Surveillance System and other defense cable projects. The system and name were at the time classified with the unclassified name Project Caesar being given to the installation and support of the system.

=== Function ===
Navy cable repair ship cable control as installed mid 1950s seen aboard Thor.

The ship was principally used to transport, deploy, retrieve and repair cables and to conduct acoustic, hydrographic, and bathymetric surveys under Project Caesar. Civilian specialists are involved during cable or surveying operations for the technical work. (Note: SOSUS and both operations and actual linkage of Project Caesar to SOSUS was at the time classified and tightly controlled. The system was covered as "oceanographic research" and the cable operations were not associated with undersea surveillance systems. Thus any public information, such as the referenced All Hands articles, did not describe the true nature of the operations. The All Hands January 1964 article emphasizes the cover story with the purpose being to connect remote ocean observation centers with shore stations.)

The Thor and Aeolus had three 34 ft (10.4 m) diameter cable tanks each with a capacity of about 20 nmi (23 mi; 37 km) of five inch armored cable or 250 nmi (290 mi; 460 km) of coaxial cable. (Note: See USS Aeolus Association's photo of Caesar cable types.) Cable being laid was under constant test by civilian experts in the ships cable test room. Cable ships with bow sheaves only required towing astern for some long runs of cable resulting in the unusual feature of two sets of running lights suitable for the stern becoming the effective bow.

By the late 1970s the two Artemis class transports converted to cable ships were in need of modernization or replacement. Some shortcomings in design worked against modernization even though two other ships of the same age were slated for major modernization. The class had been designed with a relatively shallow draft of 16 ft (4.9 m), least draft of the attack transports that had drafts from 26 ft (7.9 m) to 28 ft (8.5 m). (Note: A 10 ft (3.0 m) lesser draft might have some advantages in an attack transport allowing closer approach to beaches.) Compared to the 25 ft (7.6 m) draft of the smaller Albert J. Myer and Neptune, designed as an Army cable layers late in World War II and the only Navy ships designed as cable ships, this was a disadvantage in a cable ship's loading and operations. Both of those ships, built the same year and as old, were essentially rebuilt to extend their service life but the two larger ships were not going to be modernized. The shallow draft, which also hindered bathymetric survey work due to shallow transducer depth, and large sail area of the exposed hull and superstructure made stopped or very low speed cable operations hazardous. Thrusters could not be built into the shallow draft hulls and tugs had to be used for some operations. The ships had no stern cable capability and could not effectively be modernized for that capability. Finally, the ships could not carry a full load of cable and a full load of fuel without exceeding maximum draft limits and modernization would only add to that limitation by adding weight.

== Service history ==
=== 1956–1961 ===
The cable repair ship operated in the Atlantic through 1956. In February 1957, she reported to the Pacific Fleet and, until the fall of 1958, operated out of San Francisco repairing and laying cables. She returned to the Atlantic in September 1958 and served there until the summer of 1961, when she was temporarily assigned to the Pacific again. The cable repair ship returned to operations in the Atlantic in December.

=== 1962–1969 ===
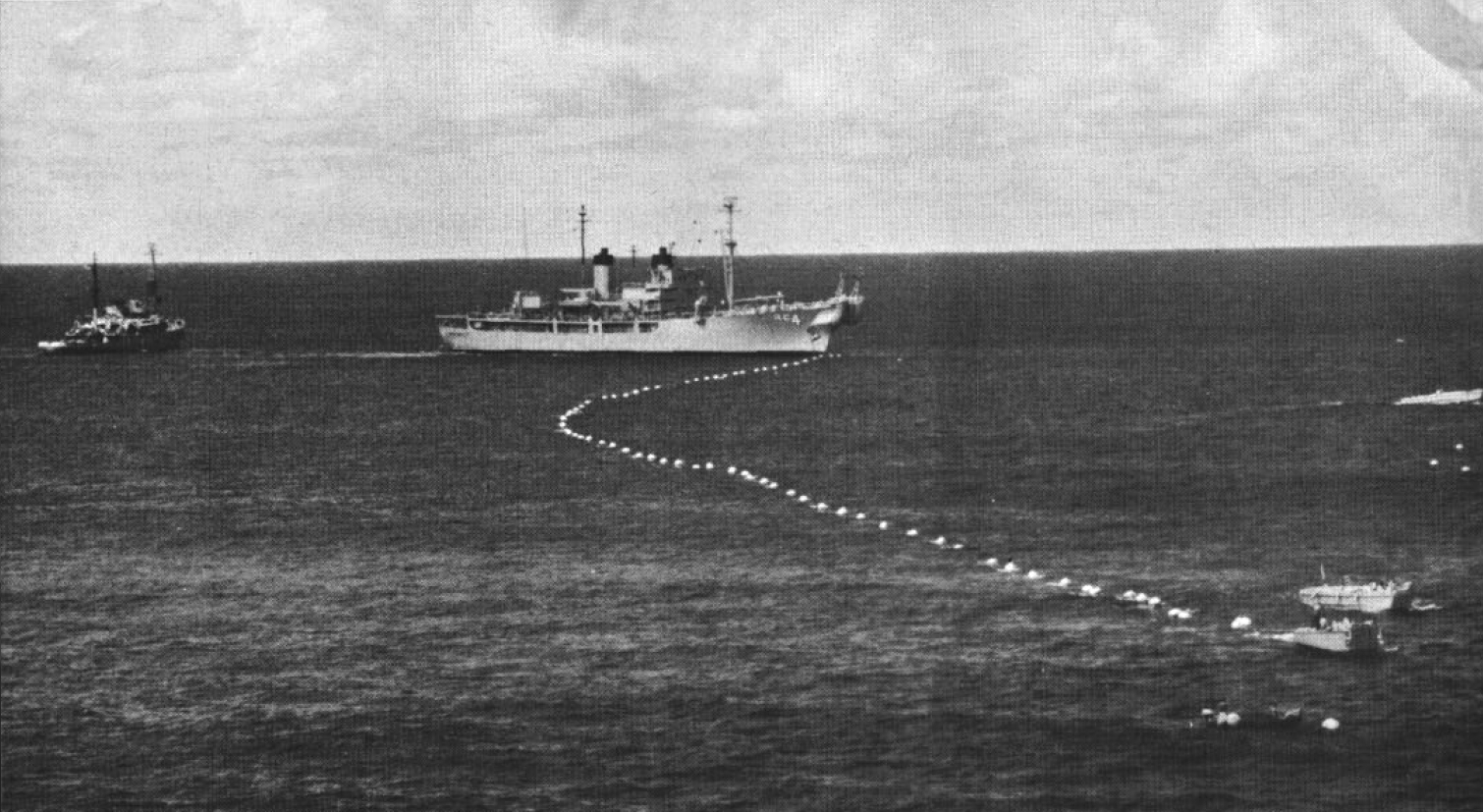
USS Thor (ARC-4) lays the shore end of a cable, circa 1963. Floats hold the cable in position for sinking.

Following an overhaul at Boston in the spring of 1962, Thor deployed to the Pacific once more for cable repair operations in the northern reaches of that ocean. In October, she returned to the eastern side of the Isthmus of Panama and busied herself with cable repair duties and oceanographic projects in the Caribbean. For the next five and one-half years, Thor continued to repair and lay cables in the western Atlantic and in the West Indies. Occasionally, she also participated in more oceanographic projects. During that half decade, she ranged as far north as Nova Scotia and as far south as the Caribbean. Periodically, she also conducted operations in the Gulf of Mexico.

On 20 April 1968, the ship departed Norfolk and steamed, via the Panama Canal and San Diego, for the Central Pacific. She conducted special operations in the vicinity of Midway Island and returned to Hawaii on 16 June for several days before departing Pearl Harbor on the 24th for the Marianas. She reached Guam on 5 July and spent the next month repairing cable around that island. She returned to Pearl Harbor on 13 August and operated in the Hawaiian Islands until she headed back toward the mainland on 7 November. Following a brief stop at Long Beach, California, Thor returned to Norfolk on 6 December.

Over the next four years, Thor deployed to the Pacific three times. In August 1969, after seven months of operations along the east coast, she headed, via the Panama Canal and San Diego, to Pearl Harbor. Through November, she conducted operations near Midway Island and then returned to the Atlantic via Pearl Harbor, Long Beach, and the Panama Canal.

=== 1970–1974 ===
In February 1970, she entered the Bethlehem Steel Shipyard in Boston to begin a year-long overhaul and repair period. In mid-February 1971, the cable repair ship resumed normal operations until late June when she deployed to the Pacific once more. She reached Hawaii on 29 July and departed again on 9 August for cable operations in the northernmost reaches of the Pacific, near the Aleutians chain. She completed those repairs late in the month and, after visits to Esquimalt, British Columbia, and San Diego, transited the canal on 20 September and arrived in Portsmouth, New Hampshire, eight days later. During the first seven months of 1972, the cable repair ship operated along the eastern seaboard again. On 24 July, Thor departed Norfolk for her last assignment in the Pacific Ocean. She arrived at Alameda, California, on 11 August and conducted cable laying operations from there into late November. On the 24th, the ship cleared Alameda. She passed through the Panama Canal on 4 December and arrived back at Portsmouth on the 12th.

On 17 January 1973, Thor embarked upon her last overseas cruise as a commissioned ship in the Navy. She arrived in Swansea, Wales, 10 days later and, after two days in port, put to sea for cable operations. From 14 February to 18 February, she visited the Submarine Base at Holy Loch, Scotland, before resuming cable operations near the Arctic Circle. She completed her assignment at the end of the month and, after another visit to Holy Loch during the first week in March, headed back to the United States. On 17 March, she returned to the Portsmouth Naval Shipyard to begin preparations for decommissioning incident to her transfer to the Military Sealift Command.

Thor was decommissioned at Portsmouth on 2 July 1973 and simultaneously transferred to the custody of the Military Sealift Command. USNS Thor (T-ARC-4) operated with the Military Sealift Command, primarily in the Pacific, until April 1974.

== Disposal ==
Thor was returned to the Maritime Administration to be placed in reserve. Berthed with the National Defense Reserve Fleet at Suisun Bay, California 31 July 1975. The ship was withdrawn 2 May 1977 for removal of cable machinery and returned to the reserve fleet on 1 June 1977. The ship was sold to National Metal & Steel Corporation for scrapping on 22 September 1977 as one of four ships sold for a total of $565,183.92.
