= USS Acontius =

Tender of the United States Navy

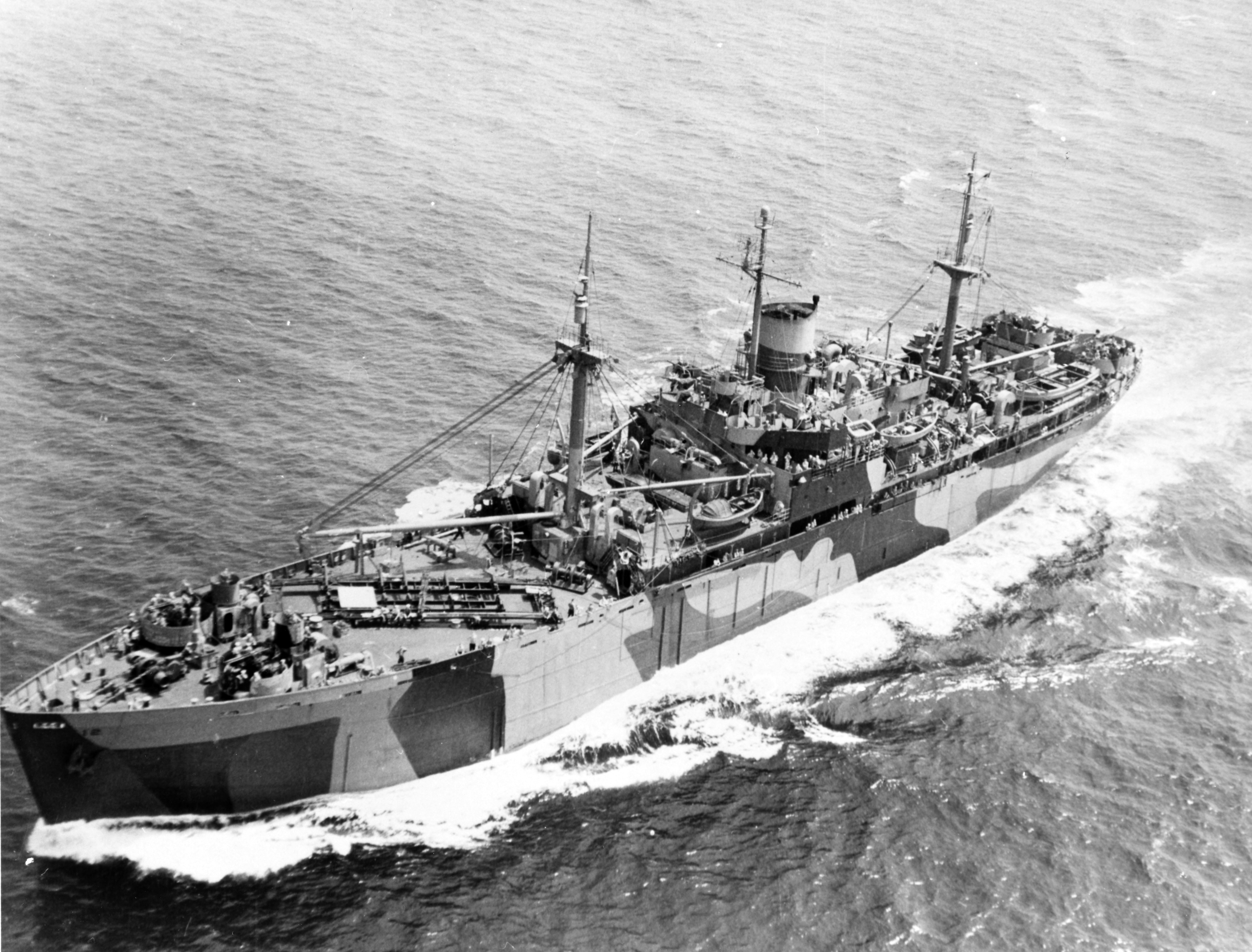
- USS Acontius (AGP-12) underway off the eastern seaboard, 12 August 1944, in Measure 31, design 2F camouflage

History
- Name: USS Acontius
- Namesake: Acontius a mythological Greek youth who lived on the island of Ceos and tricked the beautiful girl Cydippe into marrying him.
- Builder: Pusey & Jones Co, Wilmington, Delaware
- Laid down: 5 June 1943 as Cape Carthage
- Launched: 12 October 1943
- Sponsored by: Mrs. J. H. Deinlein
- Acquired: 22 December 1943
- Commissioned: 23 June 1944

General characteristics
- Displacement: 5,236t.(lt) 10,590 t.(fl)
- Length: 413 ft (126 m)
- Beam: 60 ft (18 m)
- Draft: 22 ft 6 in (6.86 m)
- Propulsion: one Allis Chalmers geared turbine engine; two Babcock & Wilcox header-type boilers, 450 psi 750°; double Falk Main Reduction Gears; three 300 kW 120 V/240 V DC Ship's Service Generators; single propeller, 4,000 shp.
- Speed: 14 knots (26 km/h)
- Crew: Officers 37; Enlisted 252
- Armament: one single 5 in (130 mm) cal dual purpose gun mount; four twin 40 mm AA gun mounts; twelve single 20 mm AA gun mounts

USS Acontius (AGP-12) was a motor torpedo boat tender in service with the United States Navy from 1944 to 1946. She was scrapped in 1965.

== History ==
Cape Carthage was laid down under a Maritime Commission contract (MC hull 304) on 5 June 1943 by Pusey & Jones Corp., Wilmington, Del.; launched on 12 October 1943; sponsored by Mrs. J. H. Deinlein; acquired by the Navy on 22 December 1943; renamed Acontius and designated AGP-12; converted for naval service at Baltimore, Md., by the Maryland Drydock Co.; and commissioned on 23 June 1944, Lt. Comdr. R. G. Heppard in command.

=== Pacific War ===
Following shakedown out of Guantanamo Bay, Cuba, Acontius steamed to the coast of Panama, transited the canal, and arrived at Tulagi, Solomon Islands, on 18 September. Except for a brief run to the Russell Islands in October, Acontius remained anchored in Tulagi harbor tending boats of Motor Torpedo Boat Squadron (MTBRon) 31 until 3 November. On that day, she moved to Blanche Harbor, Treasury Islands, and resumed her tender duties.

On 1 December, Acontius got underway for the Palau Islands in company with boats of MTBRons 20 and 31; reached Pelelieu on the 21st; and served there until 28 February 1945. Acontius then sailed for the Philippines, dropped anchor in San Pedro Bay on 3 March, and provided services to MTBRons 31 and 69. In August, the tender became the flagship for Commander, Motor Torpedo Boat Squadrons, Pacific Fleet, Commodore Richard W. Bates.

After Japan formally surrendered on 2 September, Acontius moved to Guinan anchorage, Samar, and there became involved in the inactivation of PT boats. This task was completed in December; and the tender got underway for San Francisco, Calif., on the 29th.

=== Decommissioning and fate ===
Acontius reached the west coast on 19 January 1946, was decommissioned at San Francisco on 22 March, and returned to the Maritime Commission. Her name was struck from the Naval Vessel Register on 17 April 1946. In the hands of the Maritime Commission, she resumed the name Cape Carthage and carried it until disappearing from the register of merchant ships in the mid-1960s.

== Awards ==
Acontius earned one battle star for her World War II service.
