= Pusey and Jones =

Shipbuilder and industrial equipment manufacturer in Wilmington, Delaware, USA

The Pusey and Jones Corporation was a major shipbuilder and industrial-equipment manufacturer. Based in Wilmington, Delaware, it operated from 1848 to 1959.

Shipbuilding was its primary focus from 1853 until the end of World War II, when the company converted the shipyard to produce machinery for paper manufacturing. The yard built more than 500 ships, from large cargo vessels to small warships and yachts, including Volunteer, the winner of the 1887 America's Cup.

== History ==
The company began in 1848, when Joshua L. Pusey and John Jones formed a partnership in Wilmington, Delaware, to run a machine shop in space rented from a whaling company. The shipyard sat between the Christina River and the main line of the Pennsylvania Railroad.

In 1851, Edward Betts and Joshua Seal, who were operating an iron foundry in Wilmington, purchased an interest in the business. The name of the company became Betts, Pusey, Jones & Seal.

In 1854, Pusey and Jones built the first U.S. iron-hulled sailing vessel: a schooner named Mahlon Betts after Edward's father, who had built the foundry.

At the beginning of the Civil War the company began building vessels for the U.S. military. The first was a sloop of war, which required immediate expansion of the workforce. The company also built engines and boilers for other shipbuilding firms.

In 1887, the company built the first steel-hulled yacht to win the America's Cup, "Volunteer".

During World War I, the firm grew to more than 2,000 employees. It established the Pennsylvania Shipbuilding Corporation shipyard in Gloucester City, New Jersey, with four ways capable of launching ships up to 12,500 tons and two ways of up to 7,000 tons. Shortly thereafter, the New Jersey Shipbuilding Corporation was formed and their shipyard, which was virtually an addition to the Pennsylvania S.B. yard, was planned to have six slipways for building 5,000-ton cargo steam ships. The keel of the first 7,000dwt tanker was laid on 9 September 1916.

These two yards delivered 20 ships to the United States Shipping Board, all requisitions:

- 6 tankers of 7,000dwt
- 11 cargo ships of 12,500dwt
  - Yard#7, War Serpent, launched as Indianapolis
- 3 cargo ships of 5,000dwt

The Wilmington yard delivered 14 vessels, all requisitions, and two minesweepers for the United States Navy:

- 6 cargo, 2,600t
- 8 cargo, 3,000t
- 2 of 49 Lapwing-class minesweepers
  - Eider (AM-17), Thrush (AM-18)

After the business slump of the early 1920s, the company reorganized in 1927 under businessman Clement C. Smith, becoming Pusey and Jones Corporation. The company focused on building large luxury steam and motor yachts for wealthy patrons.

As World War II approached, military orders increased. The highest employment was reached during World War II, when more than 3,600 employees worked in the shipyards, plants and offices of the company. Pusey and Jones built 19 Type C1 ships for the U.S. Maritime Commission.

Other craft such as minesweepers were built, along with specialty and smaller vessels. Many commercial and private vessels originally built by the company were also converted to military use.

On Liberty Fleet Day — September 27, 1941 — the yard launched the SS Adabelle Lykes.

After World War II, Pusey and Jones converted the shipyard's facilities to manufacture papermaking machinery.

The company closed in 1959.

== Notable vessels ==
- Cangarda
- CSS Beaufort
- Gay Head, engines only
- SS Exodus
- SS Tarpon
- State of Pennsylvania and her identical sister ship, the State of Delaware
- T.J. Potter, engines only
- Volunteer, launched 1887. Successful defender of the 1887 America's Cup
- United States lightship Nantucket (LV-112)
- United States lightship Portsmouth (LV-101)
- USAMP General E. O. C. Ord
- USCGC Mohawk (WPG-78), museum
- USC&GS Explorer (1904)
- USFC Fish Hawk (1880), the first large vessel purpose-built for the promotion of fisheries
- USNS Albert J. Myer (T-ARC-6)
- USS Acontius
- USS Alacrity (SP-206)
- USS Albatross (1882)
- USS Anacapa (AG-49)
- USS Aquamarine (PYc-7)
- USS Crystal (PY-25)
- USS Cyrene (AGP-13)
- USS Eider (AM-17)
- USS Galatea (SP-714)
- USS Galaxy (IX-54)
- USS General Putnam (SP-2284)
- USS Indianapolis (ID-3865)
- USS Jamestown (PG-55)
- Lotosland
- USS Lydonia (SP-700)
- USS Miantonomah (CMc-5)
- USS Monadnock (ACM-10)
- USNS Neptune (ARC-2)
- USS Nokomis (SP-609)
- USS Thrush (AM-18)
- Nakhoda
- Tugs Jane and Marion 1939, for Curtis Bay Towing Company, the first U.S.-built vessels with the patented Yourkevitch hull form and specifically designed to use the Kort nozzle in propulsion.

== See also ==
- Category:Ships built by Pusey and Jones
- Harlan and Hollingsworth: Nearby shipyard in Wilmington, Delaware
- Jackson and Sharp Company: Nearby shipyard in Wilmington, Delaware
