= State of Pennsylvania (steamboat) =

1923 steamboat built in Wilmington, Delaware

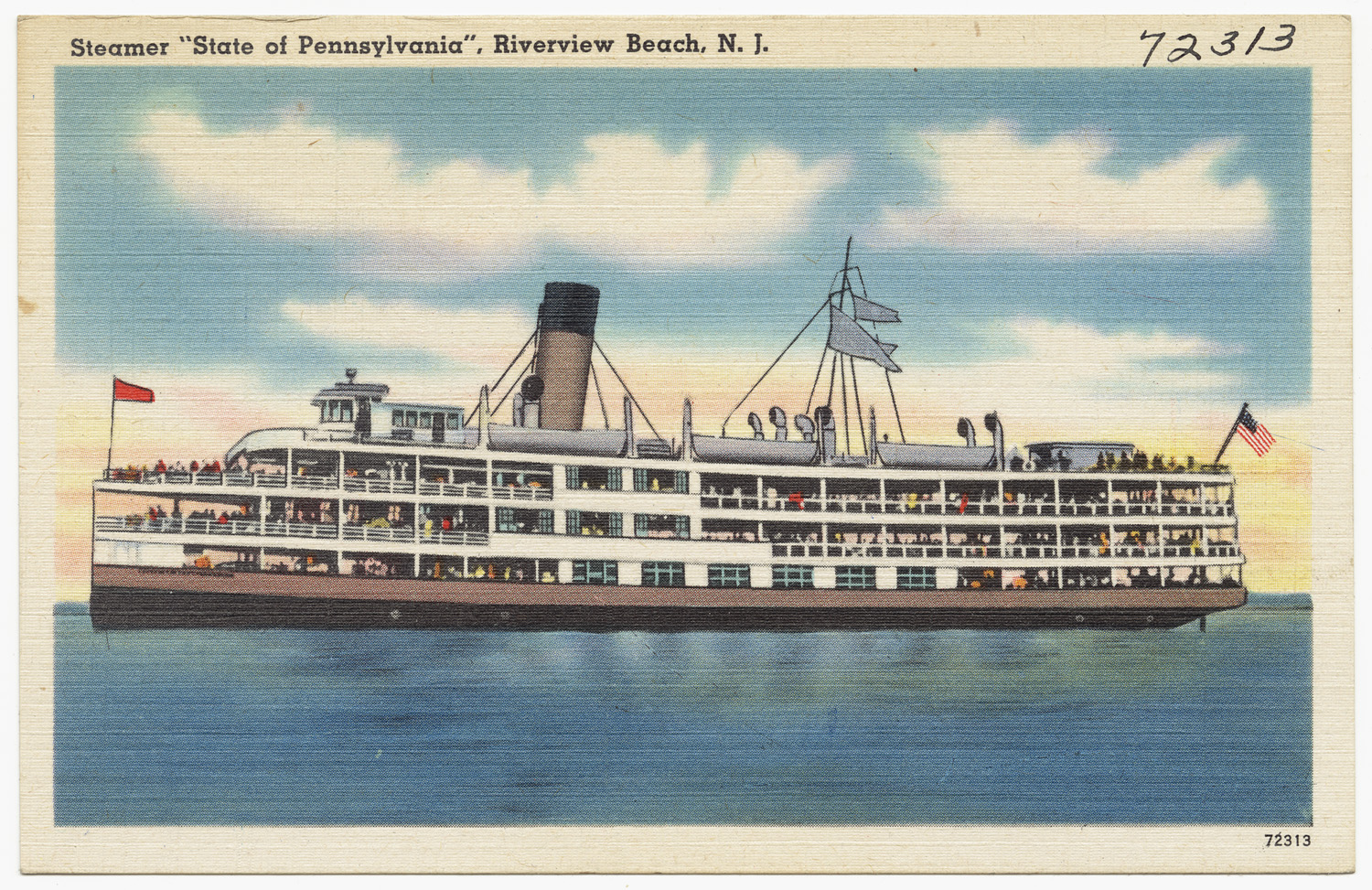
- Postcard c. 1935

History

United States
- Name: State of Pennsylvania
- Namesake: U.S. state of Pennsylvania
- Owner: Wilson Line
- Builder: Pusey and Jones
- Completed: 1923
- Home port: Wilmington, Delaware
- Fate: Sank 1970; Scrapped 2005

General characteristics
- Type: Streamlined steamboat
- Length: 219 ft (67 m); 236 ft (72 m) LAO
- Beam: 48.9 ft (14.9 m)
- Draft: 10.5 ft (3.2 m)
- Decks: 4
- Installed power: 2,900 hp (2,200 kW) triple expansion steam engine
- Speed: 18 mph (29 km/h; 16 kn)
- Capacity: 3,500 passengers; 4,000 passengers with special permit
- State of Pennsylvania (steamboat)
- U.S. National Register of Historic Places
- Location within Delaware
- Location: Christina River, Wilmington, Delaware
- Coordinates: 39°43′53″N 75°33′39″W
- NRHP reference No.: 79000637
- Added to NRHP: 20 April 1979

State of Pennsylvania was a steamboat that was built in Wilmington, Delaware in 1923, along with her identical sister ship State of Delaware. The steamboat operated on the Delaware River between her homeport of Wilmington and the cities of Chester and Philadelphia in Pennsylvania, as well as Riverview Park in Pennsville, New Jersey. Regular service on these routes was stopped in 1960. The boat foundered near her dock on the Christina River in 1970. In 1979, she was listed on the National Register of Historic Places. In 1988, the upper decks were destroyed by a deliberately set fire, and in 2005 the hull was removed and scrapped as a hazard to navigation, all without the ship being raised.

== Design ==
State of Pennsylvania and State of Delaware were "the most powerful...the widest and tallest single screw propeller riverboats on the East Coast." The two vessels were 219 feet (67 m) long with an overall length of 226 feet (69 m), with four decks. Approximately 80% of each ship was constructed of steel to help fireproof them. They drew 10.5 feet (3.2 m).

State of Pennsylvania was later extended by 10 feet (3.0 m) to an overall length of 236 feet (72 m) with the addition of a "raked bow" in 1944. Both ships were equipped with a 2,900-horsepower (2,200 kW) triple expansion steam engine, which gave them an operating speed of 18 miles per hour (29 kilometres per hour; 16 knots). State of Pennsylvania was the first riverboat to have a "coordinated whistle-light assembly" installed; the mechanism caused two lights on either side of the whistle to flash in sync with the signaling of the whistle.

The hull was occupied by the engine room, fuel oil tanks, crew's mess, and crew quarters. The purser's office, boatswain's lockers, a soda fountain, lounges and rest rooms were located on the first or Main deck. The second or Saloon deck included the ballroom and bandstand and an open observation area. The third and fourth decks were terraced observation decks, with two raised steps allowing passengers in the middle of the deck to see over passengers nearer the railings. The top deck also included the pilot house, officer's quarters, life rafts and six life boats.

== History ==
The ship and her identical sister were designed by George G. Sharp in a "streamlined" style. They were built on the Christina River by the Pusey & Jones Corporation in 1923. State of Pennsylvania was commissioned by Joseph S. Wilson, owner of the Wilson Line and son of Captain Horace Wilson, who were the only father and son to both serve as mayors of Wilmington.

The ship "entertained and transported" an estimated 20 to 25 million passengers from 1923 to 1960. Movie screens and projectors were added to the top deck in the 1930s. State of Pennsylvania and State of Delaware were the first steamboats to screen movies, as well as to broadcast radio live. The Art Deco ballroom and bandstand decorated by Philadelphia's John Wanamaker were popular and featured the "Pennsylvania Polka" as the ship's unofficial theme song.

On 27 June 1938, during the 300th anniversary celebration of the arrival of the first Swedish and Finnish settlers in America, President Franklin D. Roosevelt and Swedish Crown Prince (later King) Gustaf Adolf and the Crown Princess witnessed the special arrival in Wilmington of State of Pennsylvania and its guests.

The ship operated mostly on summer excursion routes on the Delaware River and Delaware Bay, but during World War II transported shipyard workers in Baltimore and in 1948 re-inaugurated the Wilson Line's route to New York. During the 1950s she sailed out of Philadelphia on educational trips as a "Little Red Floating School House." City Investing Corporation bought the Wilson Line in the 1950s and terminated the Philadelphia-Chester-Wilmington-Riverview Park excursion routes in September 1960, thus ending State of Pennsylvania's career.

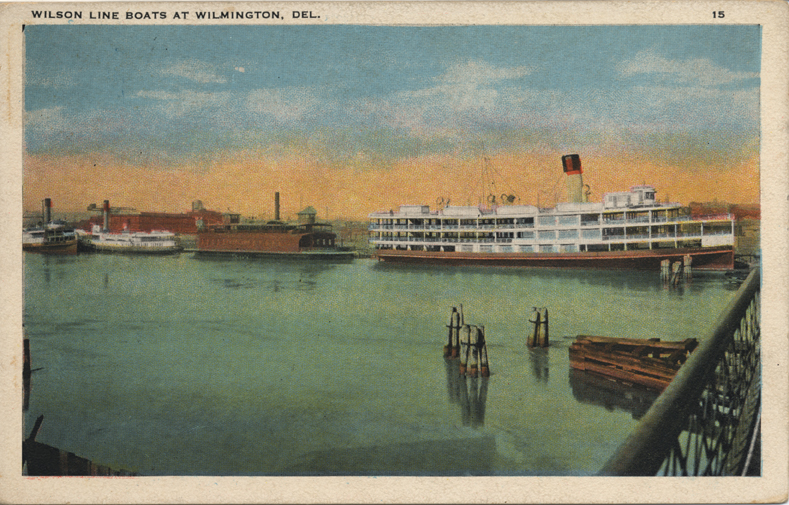
Postcard depicting Wilson Line boats on the Christina River. The State of Pennsylvania or her identical sister ship State of Delaware on the right

== See also ==
- National Register of Historic Places listings in Wilmington, Delaware

== Sources ==
- Elliott, Richard; Athan, Jean (October 1978). "National Register of Historic Places Inventory—Nomination Form / State of Pennsylvania (steamboat)" (pdf). National Park Service.
