= USS General Putnam (SP-2284) =

History

United States
- Launched: 1902 at Wilmington, Delaware
- Acquired: 6 February 1918
- In service: 29 July 1919
- Out of service: 2 October 1919
- Stricken: 1919 (est.)
- Fate: Returned to owner, 2 October 1919

General characteristics
- Displacement: 205 tons
- Length: 122 ft 6 in (37.34 m)
- Beam: 28 ft (8.5 m)
- Draught: 9 ft (2.7 m)
- Propulsion: Steam engine
- Speed: 12 knots
- Complement: Crew of 13
- Armament: none

USS General Putnam (SP-2284) was a ferry boat acquired by the U.S. Navy for local service for a short period of time during World War I. She was returned to her owner at the close of the war.

== Construction ==
General Putnam (SP-2284), a ferry boat, was built in 1902 by Pusey & Jones, Wilmington, Delaware. She was 122 feet 6 inches (37.34 m) long, 28 feet (8.5 m) wide, had a draft of 9 feet (2.7 m), and displaced 205 tonnes (202 long tons; 226 short tons). She had a top speed of 12 knots (22 km/h; 14 mph), and a complement of 13 men. She was propelled by a 325 indicated horsepower (242 kW) steam engine, which had one shaft.

== Service history ==
She was acquired under charter by the U.S. Navy on 6 February 1918, from her owner John E. Moore & Co. She was taken over on 16 July 1918; and placed in service at New York City on 29 July 1919. She was assigned to the 3d Naval District. General Putnam was manned by the owner's civilian crew and was used as a ferry boat between New York Navy Yard and Ellis Island. After the Armistice, she was returned to her owner on 2 October 1919.
