= USS Siren (PY-13) =

Patrol vessel of the United States Navy

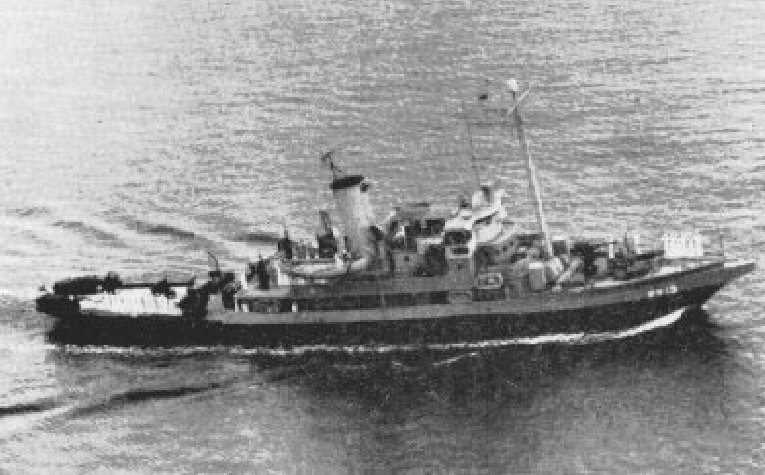
- USS Siren (PY-13), July 1943.

History

United States
- Name: Lotosland (1929–1940)
- Owner: Colonel Edward A. Deeds
- Builder: Pusey and Jones, Wilmington, Delaware
- Yard number: 408
- Laid down: 13 June 1929
- Launched: 15 November 1929
- Completed: 14 June 1930 (delivered)
- Identification: U.S. Official Number: 229875; Signal: Code letters MHWN:

History

United States
- Name: Siren (1940–1945)
- Namesake: Siren
- Cost: $140,000
- Acquired: 16 October 1940
- Commissioned: 19 July 1940
- Decommissioned: 2 May 1944
- Renamed: Siren, 12 November 1940
- Reclassified: Patrol Yacht, PY-13, 15 November 1940
- Refit: 31 October 1940, General Ship and Engine Works, East Boston, Massachusetts
- In service: 2 May 1944, Naval Training School (Salvage), Pier 88, New York
- Out of service: 23 October 1945
- Stricken: 3 November 1945
- Identification: Hull symbol:CMc-1; Hull symbol:PY-13; Code letters:NURS (CMc-1); Code letters:NCHC (PY-13)
- Fate: Sold, 31 December 1946, sold foreign, Colombian flag, by 1950

General characteristics
- Type: Yacht (1929–1940); Coastal Minelayer (1940); Patrol Yacht (1940–1945)
- Tonnage: 662 GRT, 337 Net
- Displacement: 720 long tons (732 t)
- Length: 196 ft 5 in (59.87 m) (overall); 185 ft (56 m) (registry)
- Beam: 26.1 ft (8.0 m) (registered); 28 ft 2 in (8.59 m) (DANFS) (Note: Difference in measurement basis probably accounts for beam difference.)
- Draft: 11 ft (3.4 m)
- Depth: 14.2 ft (4.3 m)
- Installed power: 2 × Winton 158 diesel engine; 1,000 shp (750 kW)
- Propulsion: 2 × screw
- Speed: 12.5 knots (23.2 km/h; 14.4 mph)
- Range: 12,000 nmi (14,000 mi; 22,000 km)
- Crew: 35 (yacht); 89 (Navy)
- Armament: 2 × 3 in (76 mm)/50 caliber guns; 2 × depth charge tracks; 2 × .30-caliber (7.62-millimeter) Lewis machine guns

USS Siren (PY-13), briefly CMc-1, was built by Pusey and Jones, Wilmington, Delaware and launched 15 November 1929 as the yacht Lotosland. The yacht was acquired by the United States Navy in October 1940 and placed in commission as a Patrol Yacht from 1940 to 1946.

== Construction ==
Lotosland, a yacht designed by the yacht design firm of Cox & Stevens and built in 1929 by Pusey and Jones of Wilmington, Delaware for Edward A. Deeds. (Note: Deeds was an electrical engineer and industrialist. His industrial connectins included the National Cash Register Company, the Dayton Engineering Laboratories (DELCO), a founder along with Orville Wright of the Dayton-Wright Airplane Company, Pratt & Whitney, and the U.S. Army as Chief of Aircraft Production.) The yacht's keel was laid 13 June 1929 as yard hull 408, contract 1043, and launched 15 November 1929. Deed's friend Orville Wright attended the launch ceremony. On 14 June 1930 the yacht was delivered to be registered with U.S. Official Number 229875 and signal MHWN.

== Yacht Lotosland ==
Lotosland was constructed of steel with clipper bow and transom stern with two pole masts and stack placed approximately amidships. A continuous deck house on the main deck contained a dining room forward with an inside passage running through the pantry to the library and a music and living room. Aft of the deck house a clear deck 40 ft (12.2 m) in length by 20 ft (6.1 m) wide suitable for dancing and other entertainment. Above was an unusually large bridge deck housing in which there were two staterooms with private baths for the owner and his wife designed for use in tropical cruising. Seven staterooms were on the berth deck, accessed from the main deck living room above by stairs. In addition to the two for the owner were five for guests. The spaces were air conditioned by early devices called Room Coolers hidden behind decorative grill work. Woodwork was teak and black walnut. Fireplaces were marble. Lotosland, even as a civilian yacht, was armed. In addition to trap shooting facilities on the stern the yacht was equipped with a one-pounder gun and a machine gun.

The steel yacht was unusual in that an organ, specially designed to resist dampness, was installed. The nine ranks of 549 pipes were installed in a special compartment on the berth deck, an area normally used for a stateroom, and the organ was installed above in the living room aft on the main deck.

An even more unusual feature for the time was capability to carry and handle an amphibious aircraft. The plane was carried on deck on the top of the after deck house and handled by a boom on the main mast. The references note the aircraft as a Loening; however, the actual aircraft was a Sikorsky S-39A four place amphibian. The original airplane was dropped as it was being lifted aboard and destroyed. It was replaced the next day by the Sikorsky.

Two six cylinder, 500 horsepower Winton diesel engines capable of a cruising speed of 12.5 kn (14.4 mph; 23.2 km/h) and a top speed of 14 kn (16 mph; 26 km/h) with fuel capacity for 12,000 nmi (14,000 mi; 22,000 km) at cruising speed.

== Navy acquisition ==
Lotosland was purchased from Col. Edward A. Deeds on 16 October 1940 for use as a coastal minesweeper and was renamed Siren (CMc-1). On 15 November 1940, she was commissioned and redesignated a patrol yacht, PY-13.

Siren was converted for military use at the General Engineering & Ship Works yards in Neponset, Mass. Her conversion completed by mid-March. Siren reported on the 18th for duty to the Commandant of the 1st Naval District.

=== Service history ===
From her home yard, Boston, she patrolled the New England coast from Eastport, Maine, to Block Island, Rhode Island. For almost a year, from March 1941 until February 1942, Siren served with the Inshore Patrol, at first on Neutrality Patrol and then, after Japan's attack on Pearl Harbor on 7 December 1941 and Germany's declaration of war on the following day, in the actual defense of the United States shoreline.

On 10 February 1942, Siren was reassigned to the Eastern Sea Frontier. This change was part of the Navy's response to the German submarine offensive of 1942 which was centered in the Caribbean Sea and the Gulf of Mexico. During this and her next assignment-to the Commander, Atlantic Fleet-from December 1942 until April 1944, Siren patrolled and escorted convoys along the southeastern coast of the United States and between the islands of the Caribbean. Her duties during these two assignments carried her to such places as Trinidad, Jamaica, Cuba, and Key West. On one occasion, she even ventured as far south as Recife, Brazil. During this period, Siren rescued survivors of a U-boat sunk by a Navy PBY patrol plane.

After a short period assigned to the 7th Naval District at Key West, Florida, in April 1944, she was transferred to the 3d Naval District at New York City for duty at the Naval Training School (Salvage). Siren was decommissioned at New York on 2 May 1944 and was placed in service. She served at the Naval Training School (Salvage) until 3 March 1945, when she sailed for temporary duty in the 8th Naval District at Orange, Texas. On 3 October 1945, she arrived at Tompkinsville, New York, to begin preparing for lay-up; and she was placed out of service there on 23 October 1945. Siren was struck from the Navy list on 13 November 1945 and turned over to the War Shipping Administration for disposal. She was sold on 13 August 1946.

== Sale ==
The vessel was sold 31 December 1946 for $12,100 and in 1950 is shown as sold foreign with flag being Colombian.
