= USNS Albert J. Myer =

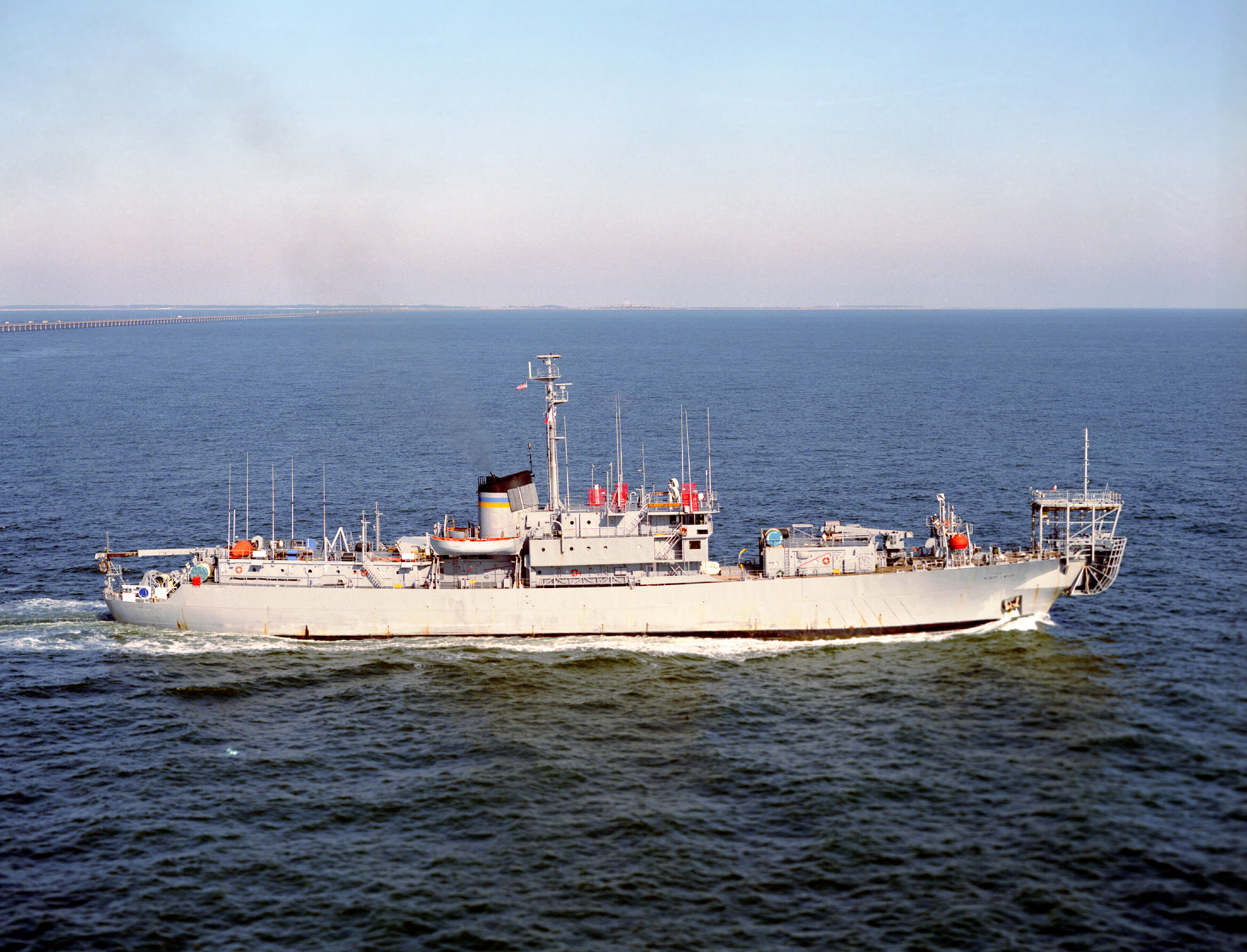

History

United States
- Name: Albert J. Myer
- Namesake: Brig. Gen. Albert J. Myer
- Builder: Pusey & Jones Corp.
- Yard number: MC hull 2558; yard hull 1109
- Laid down: 14 April 1945
- Launched: 7 November 1945
- In service: 7 February 1952 — 13 May 1966 Army; 13 May 1966 — 31 March 1994 Navy
- Stricken: 7 November 1994
- Identification: IMO number: 8832552
- Honors and awards: Meritorious Unit Commendation (1974), four Navy "E" Ribbons (1981, 1982, 1984, and 1985)
- Fate: Recycled in late 2005
- Notes: Ship underwent modifications as USNS Albert J. Myer and a major modernization in 1982 with resulting changes in specifications.

General characteristics (Note: Specifications below from DANFS entry. Navy altered Neptune while Albert J. Myer retained Army form. Both ships underwent modifications causing divergence from each other and specifications. Length overall changed with bow sheave modifications as can be seen in photos. Ships became alike in major rebuild completed in early 1980s.)
- Class & type: Neptune
- Type: S3-S2-BP1; Army cable ship, later USN Cable Repair Ship (ARC)
- Displacement: 7815 tons
- Length: 334 ft (101.8 m)
- Beam: 47.1 ft (14.4 m)
- Draft: 25.75 ft (7.8 m)
- Propulsion: 2 Skinner Uniflow Reciprocating Steam Engines; changed to diesel-electric in 1980; twin shafts
- Speed: 14 knots
- Complement: 71 civilians, 6 Navy, 25 cable/survey party
- Armament: none

USNS Albert J. Myer (T-ARC-6) was the second of only two Maritime Commission type S3-S2-BP1 ships built for the US Army near the end of World War II intended to support Army Signal Corps communications cables. She is named for Brig. Gen. Albert J. Myer, the founder of the Signal Corps. The other ship was the William H. G. Bullard, later USS Neptune, which Myer later joined in naval service.

The new ship was laid up in 1946 until reactivated by the Army in 1952 for service out of Seattle, Washington maintaining the Alaska Communications System that served civilian as well as military needs. USACS Albert J. Myer also saw service on other defense and civilian cables and supported the Navy's Project Caesar, the unclassified name for building and maintaining the Sound Surveillance System (SOSUS) that tracked Soviet submarines.

The ship was transferred on 13 June 1966 to the Navy for service as USNS Albert J. Myer (T-ARC-6) assigned to Project Caesar, though supporting other military systems on occasion. Albert J. Myer, along with sister ship Neptune, were the only ships in the Navy designed and built as cable ships. Unlike Neptune, which had been commissioned by the Navy, Albert J. Myer was never commissioned serving entirely as a civil service crewed ship under the Military Sea Transportation Service (MSTS)/Military Sealift Command (MSC). (Note: USACS William H. G. Bullard had also been laid up shortly after launch but was not activated by the Army. The Navy designated that ship for Project Caesar support in 1952 and withdrew the ship from reserve 17 February 1953. The Navy intended the ship for commissioned service renaming it Neptune designated ARC-2. USS Portunus (ARC-1) was the first designated Navy cable repair ship.) Both underwent modifications and a major rebuild in the early 1980s. Albert J. Myer was deactivated in 1994.

== Construction ==
Maritime Commission hull 2558 was laid down on 14 April 1945 by Pusey & Jones Corp. of Wilmington, Delaware as the yard's hull number 1109. (Note: Shipbuilding History has the erroneous spelling "Meyer" found in a few references.) Albert J. Myer was launched on 7 November 1945, and sponsored by Mrs. Grace Salisbury Ingles, the wife of Major General Harry C. Ingles, commanding officer of the Army Signal Corps.

== Function ==
The ship's assignments were typically to transport, deploy, retrieve and repair submarine cables. In later Naval service functions specified were towing a cable plow, a large device used to bury cable in coastal areas to protect it from damage from trawls and other hazards. Additional functions not directly related to cable work were towing acoustic projectors and conducting acoustic, hydrographic, and bathymetric surveys.

== Career ==
=== U.S. Army ===
Since World War II ended some eight months before her completion, the Albert J. Myer was delivered to the Maritime Commission on 17 May 1946 and placed in the National Defense Reserve Fleet, James River Group, Lee Hall, Virginia. The ship was again taken in by the US Army on 7 February 1952. The ship was reactivated at Baltimore, Maryland with a crew recruited from Seattle, Washington where the ship would be based and put into service as USACS Albert J. Myer operated by the U.S. Army Transportation Corps for the U.S. Army Signal Corps.

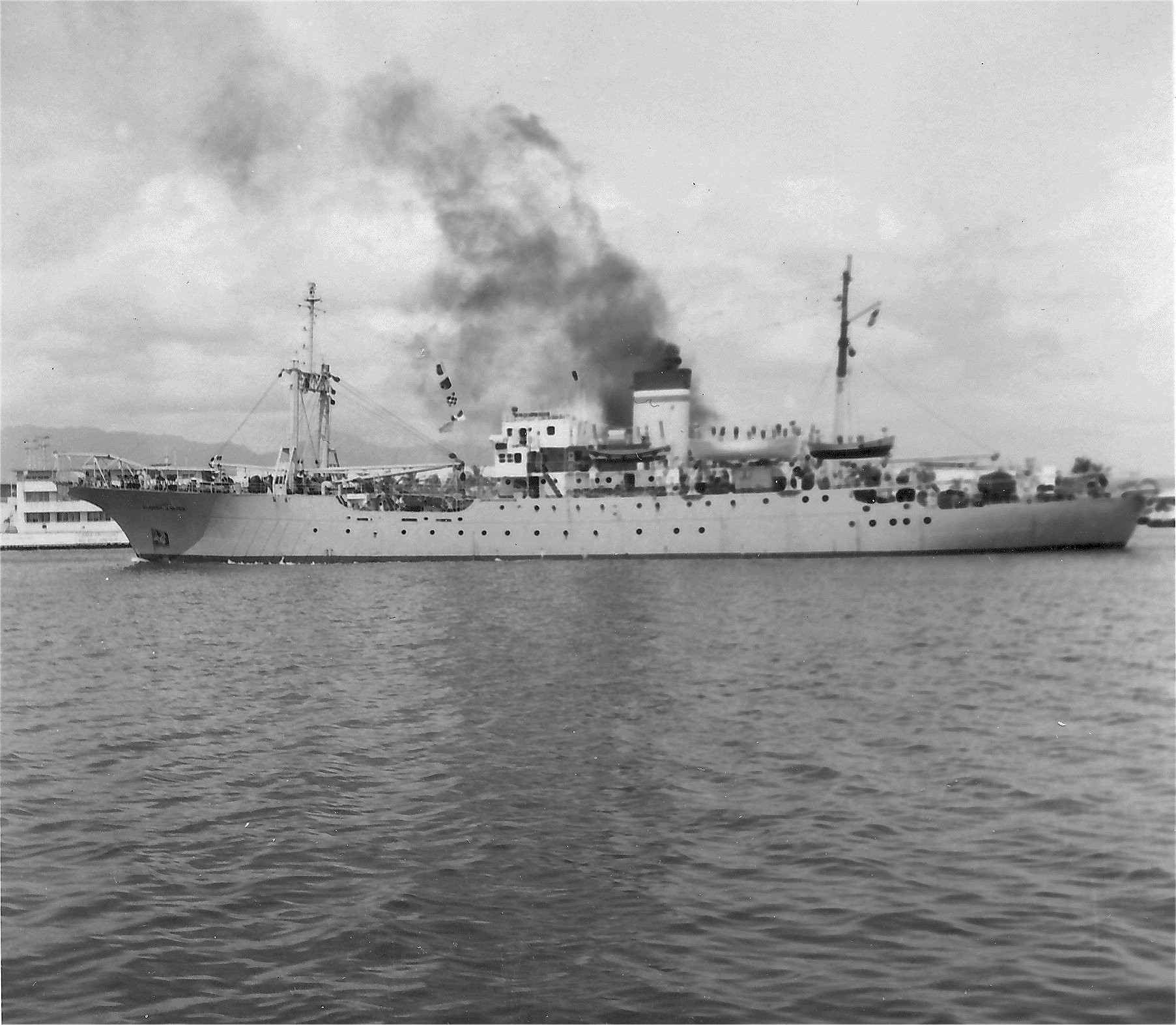
Army Cable Ship Albert J. Myer 1952 — 1966.

Albert J. Myer's primary mission at the time was maintenance of the Alaska Communications System which handled both military and commercial traffic to Alaska. Two cables linking Port Angeles, Washington and Ketchikan, Alaska with forty-eight circuits were laid in 1956. The ship also worked on projects for the Air Force and the Navy, including substantial assignment to Project Caesar in support of the Sound Surveillance System. During 1957 the ship laid cable for the U.S. Air Force between Thule, Greenland and Baffin Island with a landing at Cape Dyer. The Cape Dyer landing, subject to damage by grounding icebergs, was bypassed by the ship in 1964.

In 1961 the ship laid communications cable connecting the Pacific islands of Kwajalein, Ennylabegan (one of the islands in the Kwajalein atoll), Gugeegue, Eniwetok and Roi-Namur supporting the Army's then Kwajalein Missile Range, now the Ronald Reagan Ballistic Missile Defense Test Site for Nike Zeus tests. The first phase was laying thirty miles (Note: Submarine cable is usually measured in nautical miles, but the source does not specify and is for public consumption.) of entrenched cable connecting the islands in the Kwajalein group and then another fifty-five miles of coaxial ocean cable connecting Eniwetok and Roi-Namur to the Kwajalein network. The entrenched cable path had to be first cleared of World War II era ordinance and the trench prepared by Navy underwater demolition team.

To preserve communications the ship was also available for emergency repairs to commercial cables. For example, the cable ship repaired a break in the Cable and Wireless cable between Fanning Island and Bamfield, Vancouver Island, British Columbia that was a British around the world link. The only other cable ship available in the northwest Pacific was also an Army ship. Albert J. Myer laid the shore ends of the Hampden, Newfoundland terminus of CANTAT-1 (CANadian TransAtlantic Telephone cable).

During March and April 1964 the ship conducted an extensive, detailed magnetic survey for the U.S. Naval Oceanographic Office northeast of Hispanola.

=== U.S. Navy ===
The cable layer was returned to the Maritime Administration (MARAD), 13 June 1966, and simultaneously transferred to the Navy where she served as the cable repair ship operated by the Military Sea Transportation Service as USNS Albert J. Myer (T-ARC-6) permanently assigned to Project Caesar.

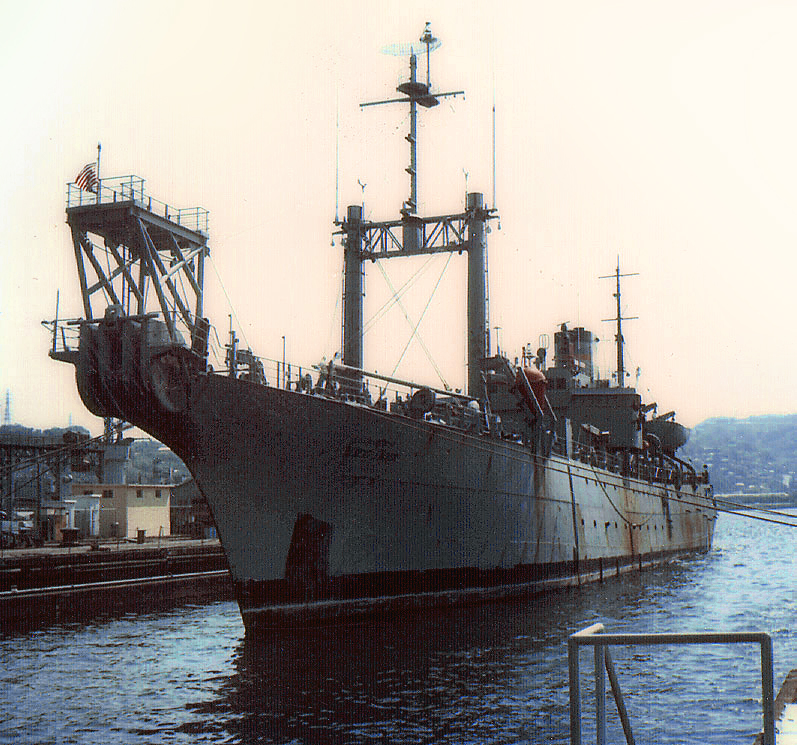
USNS Albert J. Myer (T-ARC-6) circa May 1976 before modernization.

Only two of the four cable ships available for Project Caesar had been designed and built as cable ships, the others being conversions and lacking some critical features needed for cable operations. The larger Aeolus and Thor were not suitable for modernization while Albert J. Myer and Neptune had cable ship features, including deeper draft than the larger ships, that made them suitable candidates for modernization. Albert J. Myer and Neptune were extensively modernized in 1980 by Bethlehem Steel in Baltimore, Maryland. This included new turbo-electric engines replacing two Skinner Uniflow Reciprocating Steam Engines and modern cable machinery. The two ships had been the last ships in the Navy to operate using reciprocating steam engines.

The ship performed cable repair duties all over the world until 1994, when she'd been in active service for nearly 42 years. During her career, she received a Meritorious Unit Commendation (1974), and four Navy E ribbons (1981, 1982, 1984, and 1985).

Albert J. Myer was deactivated in 1994 entering the James River Reserve Fleet at Lee Hall, Virginia on 31 March 1994. On 1 April 1998 the Navy transferred title to the Maritime Administration for disposal. The ship was dismantled and recycled by International Shipbreaking Ltd of Brownsville, TX in 2005.
