= USS Alacrity (SP-206) =

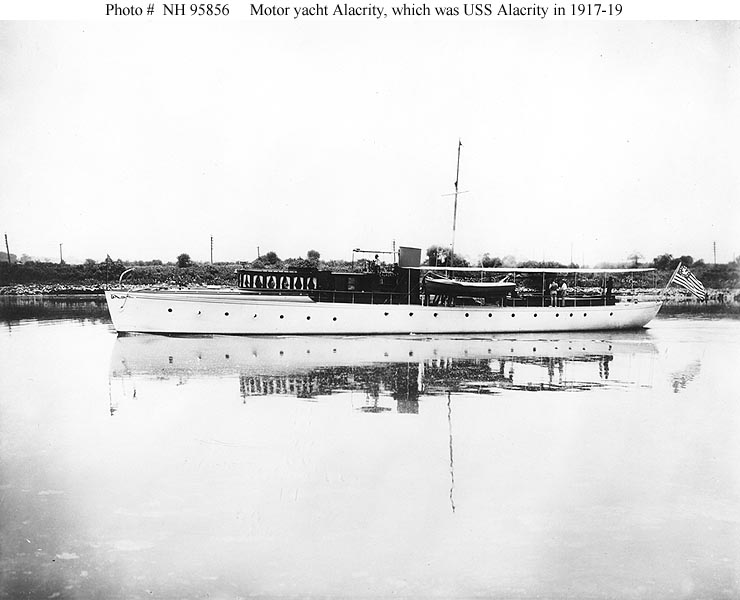
- Alacrity (U.S. Motor Yacht, 1910) Photographed by her builders, Pusey & Jones of Wilmington, Delaware, circa 1910. This craft was leased by the Navy on 28 April 1917 and commissioned on 30 May 1917 as USS Alacrity (SP-206). She was returned to her owner on 28 April 1919.

History

United States
- Name: Alacrity; Nedra B.; Blanchard
- Builder: Pusey & Jones, Wilmington, Delaware
- Laid down: 1910
- Launched: 1910
- Acquired: 28 April 1917
- Commissioned: 30 May 1917
- Decommissioned: 28 April 1919
- Stricken: 28 April 1919
- Identification: United States O/N: 207597
- Fate: Returned to owner

General characteristics
- Tonnage: 69 GRT
- Displacement: 101 tons
- Length: 118 ft (36.0 m) LOA 109 ft 9 in (33.5 m) WL; 118 ft 0 in (36.0 m)
- Beam: 15 ft 6 in (4.7 m); 15 ft 0 in (4.6 m)
- Draft: 5 ft 6 in (1.7 m); 5 ft 1 in (1.5 m) (mean)
- Depth of hold: 9 feet 4 inches (2.8 m)
- Speed: 14 knots
- Complement: 16
- Armament: one 3-pounder, one 1-pounder, 2 machine guns, one depth charge track, (Y gun))

USS Alacrity (SP-206) was a steel cruising yacht that served in the US Navy as a section patrol craft. It was built by Pusey & Jones at Wilmington, Delaware for W. A. Bradford in 1910 then sold to John H. Blodgett of Boston.

== Yacht Alacrity ==
It was designed by Cox and Stevens and built for W. A. Bradford at Pusey & Jones of Wilmington, Delaware in 1910. The vessel had the United States official number 207597 with the call letters LBNR, 69 GRT, 101 tons net, with over all 118 feet (36.0 m) length, 109 feet 9 inches (33.5 m) waterline length, 15 feet 6 inches (4.7 m) beam, 5 feet 6 inches (1.7 m) draft and 9 feet 4 inches (2.8 m) depth.

The yacht was sold to John H. Blodgett of Boston.

== World War I service ==
The yacht Alacrity was acquired by the Navy on 28 April 1917 under a free lease from Mr. John H. Blodgett and was placed in commission on 30 May 1917 at Boston, Massachusetts. Designated hull number SP-206 the vessel was assigned to the 1st Naval District for the duration of World War I conducting patrols from the Boston and Provincetown, Massachusetts, section bases. Following the armistice in November 1918, the motorboat continued naval service until she was finally returned to her owner on 28 April 1919, the second anniversary of her acquisition. Her name was struck from the Navy list that same day.

== Return to yachting ==
After return from the Navy the yacht was sold to Kenneth B. Van Ripper of New York who refurbished the vessel's propulsion. The original six cylinder Craig engines were replaced by six cylinder Winton gasoline engines each rated at 225 horsepower. At some point the yacht was renamed Nedra B..

== World War II Coast Guard service ==
The yacht was acquired at a cost of $1 and converted at a cost of $2,390 into the Coast Guard's Blanchard commissioned 20 August 1942 during the U-boat blitz along the eastern seaboard then underway to augment coastal patrols. Blanchard, designated first CGR-106 and later WPYc-369, was assigned to the Gulf Sea Frontier serving out of Key West conducting anti-submarine and escort duties until decommissioned on 25 November 1943 and returned to her owners.

== Bibliography ==
- Colton, T. (September 12, 2014). "Pusey & Jones, Wilmington DE". Shipbuilding History. T. Colton. Archived from the original on 25 December 2013.
- Day, Thomas Fleming, ed. (1912). "New Engines for Alacrity". The Rudder. 36 (January 1920). Fawcett Publications: 25.
- Lloyd's Register of Shipping (1917). Lloyd's Register of American Yachts. New York: Lloyd's Register of Shipping. p. 136.
- Naval History And Heritage Command. "Alacrity I (SP-206)". Dictionary of American Naval Fighting Ships. Naval History And Heritage Command.
- NavSource Online. "USCGC Blanchard (WPYc 369), ex-USCGC Blanchard (CGR 106), ex-USS Alacrity (SP 206)". NavSource.
- United States Coast Guard Historian's Office (November 17, 2014). "Blanchard, 1942". United States Coast Guard.
