= USS Nashawena =

History

United States
- Name: Col. William. A. Glassford (1943—1947); Nashawena (1947—1959); Omega (1959—?)
- Namesake: Army officer Col. William A. Glassford (1853–1931); Nashawena Island, Massachusetts
- Owner: U.S. Army (1943—1947); U.S. Navy (1947—1959); Commercial (1959—1975?)
- Builder: Seattle Shipbuilding and Dry Dock Corporation, Seattle, Washington
- Laid down: 1943
- Acquired: from the United States Army, 20 June 1947
- Commissioned: 20 June 1947 as USS Nashawena (AG-142)
- Decommissioned: 17 August 1953, at Mare Island Naval Shipyard, Vallejo, California
- Reclassified: YAG-35, 9 September 1947
- Home port: Mare Island, California
- Fate: Sold, 1 June 1960, renamed Omega, scrapped 1975?
- Notes: Official number: 285876 (after commercial sale)

General characteristics
- Type: cable layer
- Tonnage: 602 tons
- Length: 154 ft (46.9 m)
- Beam: 36 ft (11.0 m)
- Draft: 6 ft (1.8 m)
- Propulsion: 3 x diesel, 3 screw
- Speed: 10 knots
- Complement: 29 officers and enlisted
- Armament: none
- Notes: Flat bottomed barge, capable of beaching.

USS Nashawena (AG-142/YAG-35) was a United States Navy cable layer constructed during World War II for the Army as the wooden-hulled self-propelled barge BSP 2008. The barge was completed converted to cable work for U.S. Army Signal Corps as the cable ship Col. William. A. Glassford supporting the Alaska Communications System in the shallow island waters of Alaska. (Note: The "prefix" USASPB associated with the vessel is an error. The Army's designation of self propelled barges was Barge, Self Propelled (BSP). Smaller vessels simply had the designation "U.S. Army" and a number without being named. Some vessels were named but also bore the usual Army identification. The use can be seen in this photo of Col. William. A. Glassford in which "U.S. Army" is followed by "B.S.P. 2008" with Glassford underneath on the hull.) She was transferred to the United States Navy in 1947 as a miscellaneous auxiliary and assigned to cable-laying duties for the U.S. Pacific Fleet.

The ship was sold to commercial interests in 1960 becoming United States Underseas Cable Corporation's Omega in 1961. Omega did cable work in the Navy's Atlantic Undersea Test and Evaluation Center (AUTEC) and laid shore ends for part of the Air Force's Atlantic Missile Range and the Vietnam Coastal Network connecting coastal centers in Vietnam and a terminus in Thailand. In 1971 the ship, along with the company's larger cable layer were sold to a Liberian registered company set up to buy the two ships. Omega ceased cable operations after the sale and may have been scrapped in 1975.

== Construction ==
The vessel built in 1943 as the Army self propelled barge BSP-2098 by the Seattle Shipbuilding and Dry Dock Corp., Seattle, Washington. The barge was one of two converted to a cable ship to be operated for the U.S. Army Signal Corps as Col. William A. Glassford. (Note: BSP 2009 was converted to the cable ship Col. Basil O. Lenoir.) (Note: Col. William A. Glassford was a career Army Signal Corps officer, father of Vice Admiral William A. Glassford.) The two barges were completed as vessels suited to shallow water work in Alaska with triple screws, two cable tanks capable of holding 400 tons of cable, three 4 ft 6 in (1.4 m) bow sheaves, and a Sundfelt combined paying out-picking up cable machine.

== U.S. Army ==
Col. William A. Glassford and Col. Basil O. Lenoir specialized in cable work in extreme shallow waters in the Alaskan islands. The ships supported the Alaska Communications System for the U.S. Air Force. (Note: Col. Basil O. Lenoir would remain in Alaska after the U.S. Air Force took over the cable system becoming an Air Force vessel until sold to RCA in 1973.) The wartime cable work in Alaska was so urgent that cable machinery originally intended for the vessel was diverted to equip the cable ship Silverado which Col. William A. Glassford joined in Alaska on completion.

After an overhaul at Mare Island Naval Shipyard the vessel left on 4 March 1947 to begin work installing the first of two west coast SOFAR stations at Monterey, California. Three hydrophones were planted in Monterey Canyon at 350 fathoms (2,100 ft; 640 m) fathoms and connected to the already built shore facility by 14 nmi (16 mi; 26 km) of cable. Another hydrophone was planted at 400 fathoms (2,400 ft; 732 m) connected to shore by 14 nmi (16 mi; 26 km) of cable. The plan for Monterey was for a total of seven hydrophones but tests showed the canyon walls interfered with accuracy so that relocation was required. That and a fire in Glassford's engine room effectively ended cable work for 1947.

== U.S. Navy ==
The ship was transferred to the U.S. Navy 20 June 1947; and commissioned as Nashawena (AG–142) the same day.

Nashawena soon commenced cable laying and tending services in the 12th Naval District and in the 14th Naval District for the U.S. Naval Electronics Laboratory. The vessel was reclassified YAG–35, 9 September 1947. The vessel continued the SOFAR station relocation to Point Sur from Monterey and installing the second station at Point Arena. Nashawena continued to provide communications maintenance until decommissioned at Mare Island, her homeport 17 August 1953. She was then turned over to the Naval Station, Treasure Island, California, where she operated briefly with the status "in service" before entering the Pacific Reserve Fleet at the end of the year.

== Commercial service ==
Nashawena was sold to Anthony Zahardis, 1 June 1960 and towed from Treasure Island, 3 July, and subsequently struck from the Naval Register. In 1961 ship was owned by United States Underseas Cable Corporation, registered commercially with official number 285876 renamed Omega, and made available for charter.

CS Omega was used for cable work in the Atlantic Undersea Test and Evaluation Center. In 1962 the United States Underseas Cable Corporation won an Air Force contract to lay cable supporting the Atlantic Missile Range. Western Electric Company was responsible for the main range but Underseas Cable Corporation was to lay cable connecting Grand Turk to Ramey Air Force Base, Puerto Rico with 336 nmi (387 mi; 622 km) of cable with nineteen repeaters and a second stage 377 nmi (434 mi; 698 km) of cable with twenty-one repeaters connecting Ramey with Coolidge Air Force Base, Antigua. Omega laid all the shore ends of these segments.

Omega laid the shore ends of the Air Force Vietnam Coastal Network system in 1967 at Da Nang, Qui Nhon, Nha Trang, Cam Ranh Bay, Vung Tau, in Vietnam and then at Ban Sattahip, Thailand.

In 1971 the ship was sold to International Marine Operations Inc., registered in Liberia, set up for the purchase of the two Underseas Cable Corporation vessels Neptun (Note: Built 1962 by Lubecker Flenderwerke A.G., as bulk carrier. Converted to cable work, renamed Cable Venture 18 April 1977.) and Omega. Omega ceased cable work and may have been scrapped in 1975.

== See also ==
- Alaska Communications System
- USNS Albert J. Myer
