= USS Galatea (SP-714) =

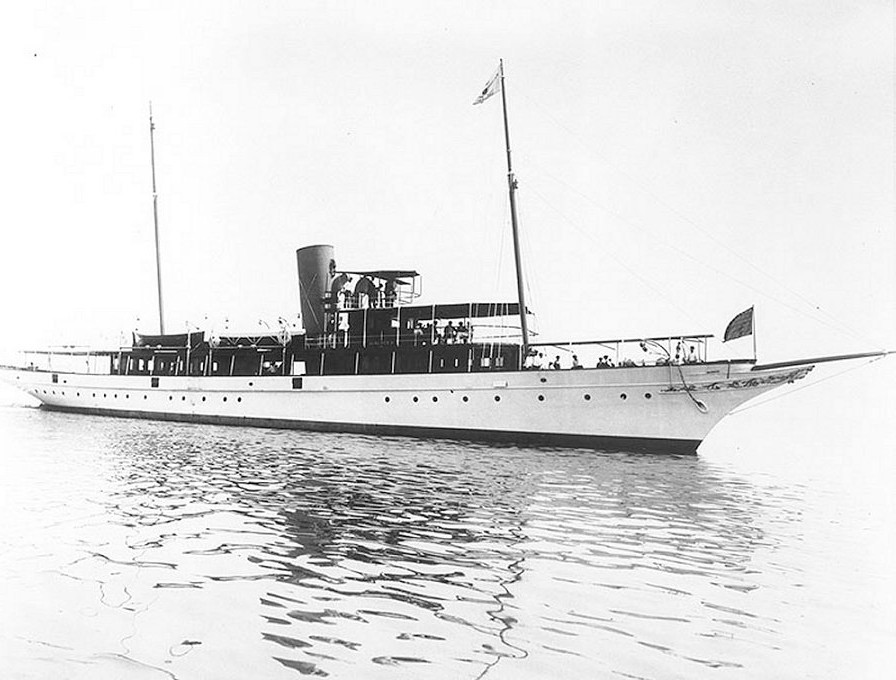
- Galatea, probably photographed upon completion by her builder, Pusey and Jones of Wilmington, Delaware.

History

United States
- Name: Galatea
- Namesake: A Greek mythological sea nymph
- Owner: E.L. Ford, Grosse Pointe Farms, Michigan
- Port of registry: Detroit
- Builder: Pusey and Jones, Wilmington, Delaware
- Completed: 1914
- Acquired: by the Navy 14 July 1917
- Commissioned: 25 August 1917
- Decommissioned: 26 September 1917
- In service: 16 November 1917
- Out of service: 15 July 1919 at Boston, Massachusetts
- Reclassified: District Patrol Craft, USS Galatea (YP-714)
- Fate: Sold 20 December 1921; fate unknown
- Notes: as YP-714, she served as a receiving ship for submarine crews

General characteristics
- Type: steam yacht
- Tonnage: 367 GRT, 195 NRT
- Length: 192 ft (59 m) overall; 159.6 ft (48.6 m) registered
- Beam: 24.8 ft (7.6 m)
- Draft: 9 ft (2.7 m)
- Depth: 14.1 ft (4.3 m)
- Installed power: 49 NHP
- Propulsion: 1 × triple-expansion engine; 1 × screw
- Sail plan: schooner
- Speed: 14 knots (26 km/h)
- Complement: 57 officers and enlisted
- Armament: 3 × 3-inch guns

USS Galatea (SP-714/YP-714) was a steam yacht acquired by the U.S. Navy during World War I. She was outfitted as an armed patrol craft and served in the North Atlantic Ocean. At war's end she was used as a receiving ship in Portsmouth, New Hampshire, for submariners before being sold in 1921.

== A yacht built in Wilmington, Delaware ==
The second ship to be so named by the U.S. Navy, Galatea was a fresh water yacht built in 1914 by Pusey and Jones of Wilmington, Delaware; purchased by the Navy 14 July 1917 at Detroit, Michigan, from E. L. Ford, Grosse Pointe Farms, Michigan, and commissioned at Detroit 25 August 1917.

== World War I service ==
Galatea departed Detroit 25 August 1917 for the Boston Navy Yard where she decommissioned 26 September for conversion to an armed patrol craft. She recommissioned 16 November 1917. Next proceeding to Philadelphia, Pennsylvania, she sailed from there for the Azores 15 December 1917 with French Submarine Chaser 314 in tow.

Proceeding by way of Bermuda, Galatea arrived Ponta Delgada, Azores, 22 January 1918, racked and strained by the towing of the submarine chaser. Damage required repairs until May 1919 when she began service as an interisland transport in the Azores.

She carried the American Consul from Ponta Delgada for official calls on the governors of Horta, Fayal and Angra, Terceira, returning to her base in time to honor Navy Seaplane NC-3 on 19 May, and Navy Seaplane NC-4 on 20 May, as they arrived in Ponta Delgada on the historic first transoceanic flight.

== Decommissioning and disposal ==
Galatea departed Ponta Delgada 7 June 1919 for Boston, Massachusetts, where she decommissioned 15 July. The following year she was towed to the Portsmouth Navy Yard in Kittery, Maine, to serve as receiving ship for submarine crews. She was sold at Portsmouth, New Hampshire, 20 December 1921 to Captain A. A. Tanos of New York City.
