= USS Galaxy =

History

United States
- Name: USS Galaxy
- Builder: Pusey and Jones, Wilmington, Delaware
- Launched: 1930
- Acquired: by purchase, 8 September 1941
- Commissioned: 20 September 1941
- Decommissioned: 2 August 1945
- In service: 2 August 1945
- Out of service: 25 March 1946
- Stricken: 1 May 1946
- Home port: East Boston
- Fate: Transferred to Maritime Commission for disposal, 20 May 1946
- Notes: Hull #410

General characteristics
- Type: Research ship
- Displacement: 320 long tons (325 t)
- Length: 130 ft (40 m)
- Beam: 21 ft 4 in (6.50 m)
- Draft: 7 ft 3 in (2.21 m)
- Propulsion: Diesel engines
- Speed: 11.4 knots (21.1 km/h; 13.1 mph)
- Complement: 27
- Armament: None

USS Galaxy (IX-54), was a diesel motor yacht built in 1930 by Pusey and Jones Company, in Wilmington, Delaware for Mr. Bernard W. Doyle, of Leominster, Massachusetts. Purchased by the United States Navy on 8 September 1941 and commissioned at East Boston, Massachusetts, on 20 September 1941. The Galaxy was the only ship of the Navy to hold this name.

== Service history ==
Galaxy was acquired for the express purpose of research in underwater sound. Based at East Boston throughout her entire career, as a unit of the 1st Naval District, she completed a variety of assignments for the Underwater Sound Laboratory, Fort Trumbull, New London, Connecticut; experimental underwater sound work for the Bureau of Ships and the Harvard Underwater Sound Laboratory. These operations were carried out at Boston and off New London; and for a brief time off the Delaware breakwaters and in the Chesapeake Bay.

She was decommissioned and was placed "in service" on 2 August 1945, to continue her experimental assignments until placed out of service at Boston on 25 March 1946. Her name was struck from the Navy List on 1 May 1946 and she was transferred to the Maritime Commission on 20 May 1946 for disposal.

== Awards ==
- American Defense Service Medal
- American Campaign Medal
- World War II Victory Medal
