= USS Thrush (AM-18) =

Minesweeper of the United States Navy

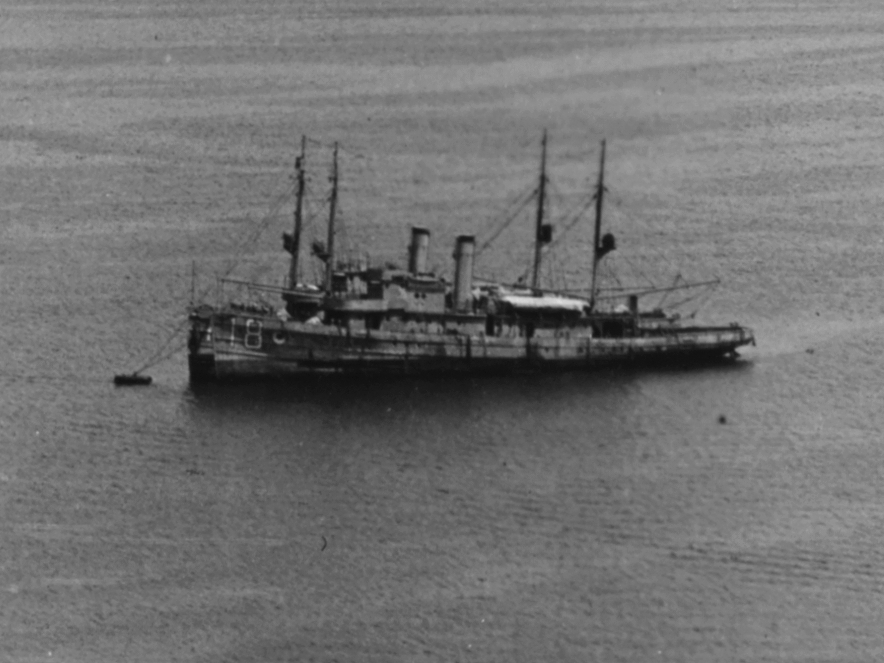

History

United States
- Name: USS Thrush
- Builder: Pusey and Jones Co., Wilmington, Delaware
- Laid down: 27 May 1918
- Launched: 15 September 1918
- Commissioned: 25 April 1919, as Minesweeper No.18
- Decommissioned: 3 April 1922
- Reclassified: AM-18, 17 July 1920
- Recommissioned: 31 October 1935
- Decommissioned: 13 December 1945
- Reclassified: AVP-3, 22 January 1936
- Stricken: 8 January 1946
- Fate: Sold, 21 August 1946

General characteristics
- Class & type: Lapwing-class minesweeper
- Displacement: 840 long tons (853 t)
- Length: 187 ft 10 in (57.25 m)
- Beam: 35 ft 6 in (10.82 m)
- Draft: 8 ft 10 in (2.69 m)
- Speed: 14 knots (26 km/h; 16 mph)
- Complement: 85
- Armament: 2 × 3 in (76 mm) guns

USS Thrush (AM-18) was a Lapwing-class minesweeper acquired by the United States Navy for the dangerous task of removing mines from minefields laid in the water to prevent ships from passing.

Thrush (Minesweeper No. 18) was laid down on 27 May 1918 at Wilmington, Delaware, by Pusey and Jones Co.; launched on 15 September 1918; sponsored by Mrs. J. E. Taylor; and commissioned on 25 April 1919.

== World War I mine clearance ==
Following shakedown, Thrush arrived in Kirkwall, Scotland, on 5 June and served with Squadron 3 of the Minesweeping Detachment which was busy clearing the North Sea Mine Barrage which had effectively contained the German Navy during World War I. Detached on 25 November, the minesweeper called at Brest, France, before returning to the United States.

== Assigned to Pacific operations ==
Subsequently, assigned to Mine Division 3, Mine Squadron 4, the ship was designated AM-18 on 17 July 1920. Thrush joined the U.S. Pacific Fleet and was based at San Pedro, Los Angeles, before her base of operations was shifted to Pearl Harbor. Engaging in peacetime exercises and maneuvers in the Hawaiian Islands into the early spring of 1922, the minesweeper was decommissioned at Pearl Harbor on 3 April and placed on the inactive list.

== Converted to seaplane tender ==
After over 13 years in reserve, the minesweeper was recommissioned at Pearl Harbor on 31 October 1935 and refitted at the Mare Island Navy Yard, Vallejo, California. There she was converted to a small seaplane tender and redesignated AVP-3 on 22 January 1936. The tender operated out of Seattle, Washington, with Aircraft Base Force through April 1937. She then proceeded to Coco Solo, Panama Canal Zone, in October, to tend planes attached to Patrol Wing (PatWing) 3.

== East Coast operations ==
Operating with Aircraft Scouting Force through 1939, the seaplane tender was attached to PatWing 5 tending a brood of planes at San Juan, Puerto Rico, when World War II began in Europe. In January 1940, she moved to the Virgin Islands and worked out of St. Thomas until March. She then returned to San Juan and remained there through December, continuing her operations in support of the Neutrality Patrol.

Anchoring off the mouth of the St. Johns River, near Jacksonville, Florida, Thrush stood plane-guard duty while tending a covey of Martin PBM Mariners through January and February 1941. Switched to Tucker's Island, near Hamilton, Bermuda, Thrush continued her plane-tending duties through March, on occasion serving as a small cargo vessel to transport supplies from ships to docks and depots on shore.

The seaplane tender then performed similar duties at San Juan, Puerto Rico, and in the British West Indies until she departed Trinidad on 28 November, bound for Brazil. She arrived at Pará on 7 December 1941, the day Japanese planes swept down on the American base at Pearl Harbor in a devastating raid which plunged the United States into World War II.

== World War II Atlantic operations ==
Thrush conducted wartime patrols out of Pará before moving her base of operations to Natal, Brazil, on 20 December. Refuelling planes, carrying supplies, and serving as a seagoing "jack-of-all-trades" – even as a floating radio station upon occasion – Thrush continued operations off the Brazilian coast through the early spring of 1942.

On 18 May, Brazilian Lloyd steamer SS Commandante Lyra fell victim to a German U-boat's torpedoes off Cape San Roque, Brazil. Thrush responded to the merchantman's signal requesting assistance. When she reached the burning ship, she sent over a salvage party to fight both the flames which blazed in two holds and the flooding which had already entered several compartments. The seaplane tender passed a towline to the stricken merchantman and towed her 200 miles to Fortaleza Bay.

The ship continued operations out of Natal and Recife, Brazil, through October 1942. She departed Fortaleza Bay on 14 October, bound, via Trinidad and San Juan, for Norfolk, Virginia. Arriving at Hampton Roads on 1 November, the ship underwent an overhaul and upkeep period at the Norfolk Navy Yard before 12 days of gunnery training and other exercises in Chesapeake Bay through 26 December. The ship then called at Mayport, Florida and Jacksonville, Florida, before arriving at San Juan on 8 January 1943. Pressing on to Trinidad, Thrush spent one week at the British West Indian port before heading for Brazil and arriving at Belém on the 25th. She then operated off the coast of Brazil escorting coastal convoys until 4 April, when she departed Belém and proceeded homeward—via Trinidad, San Juan, Guantanamo Bay, Cuba, and the Windward passage—and reached Norfolk on 22 April.

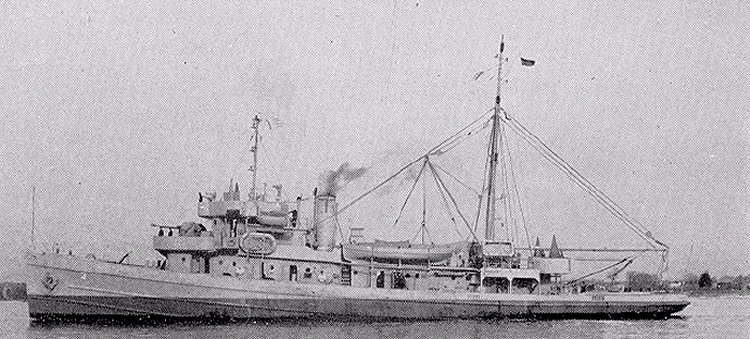
USS Thrush in 1943.

On 2 May, Thrush arrived at Quonset Point, Rhode Island, to begin training operations which lasted through the summer. Engaged in antisubmarine drills, the seaplane tender towed targets for dive-bomber practices; retrieved practice torpedoes; and acted as an escort for R class submarines engaged in training exercises with aircraft. Upon completion of this duty, the ship moved south and made port at Norfolk on 9 August for availability which lasted through 11 September.

Heading further south, Thrush took part in the dismantling of naval air bases at Almirante Bay, Panama, and at Moneypenny Anchorage, Nicaragua. She then deployed to Baltra Island in the Galápagos group during November and returned to Panamanian waters in December.

Operating in the Panama Canal Zone through January 1944, Thrush subsequently carried a U.S. Army surveying party to the Cocos Islands and to the Honduran coast in March before towing a Navy oil barge back to Panama. From April through September, the ship participated in submarine training exercises off Key West, Florida, and towed targets for submarines and aircraft before putting into the Norfolk Navy Yard for availability.

Following repairs, she headed south, via Trinidad, to Surinam and arrived at Paramaribo on 19 November. She anchored off the mouth of the Surinam River and commenced tending Martin PBM's—a duty which lasted through March 1945, punctuated briefly by an inspection at Trinidad. Subsequently, Thrush returned to the routine operations of beaching and repairing aircraft, fueling them, and feeding their crews. Acting also as a floating radio station, the seaplane tender continued these duties from her return from Trinidad on 24 March to 4 June.

== Transit to the Pacific Ocean ==
After making port at San Juan on 12 June, Thrush commenced a month-long repair period before getting underway for the Hawaiian Islands. She transited the Panama Canal and called at Manzanillo, Colima, Mexico, and San Diego, en route, and reached Pearl Harbor on 26 August. The tender remained in Hawaiian waters through 20 September and then returned to the U.S. West Coast at San Pedro, California, on 30 September. She next returned to the Atlantic—via Manzanillo, Colima, and the Panama Canal—and arrived at Norfolk on 1 November.

The following day, she set out for Massachusetts waters, via New York City and the Cape Cod Canal, and arrived in Boston, Massachusetts, on 4 November 1945. There, the Navy decided that the venerable seaplane tender was beyond economical repair.

== Decommissioning ==
Thrush was decommissioned on 13 December 1945 and struck from the Navy List on 8 January 1946. Transferred to the Maritime Commission on 19 August, she was sold to John A. Pohl, of Haworth, New Jersey, on 21 August.
