= USNS Neptune =

US Navy cable repair ship

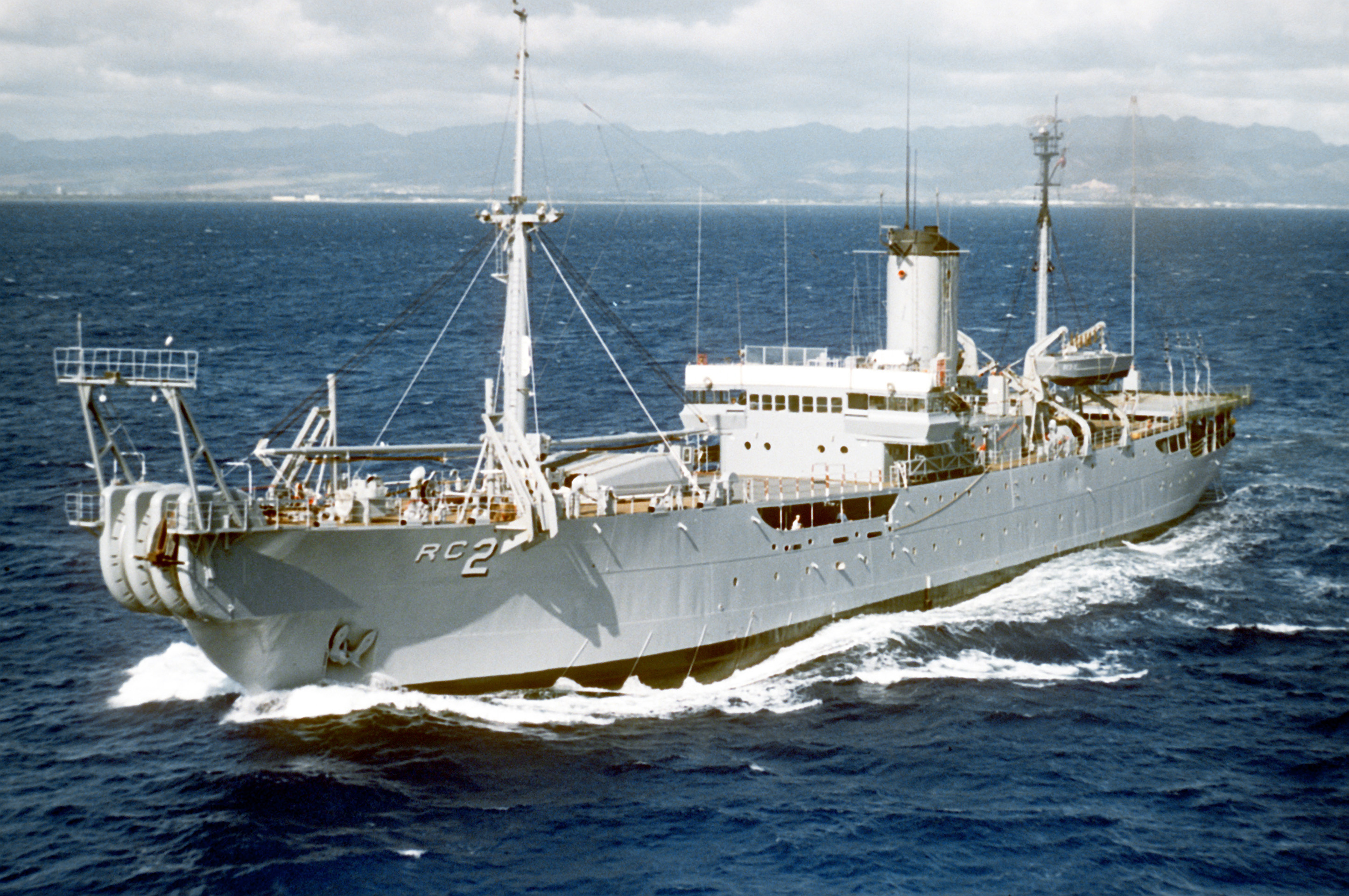
- USNS Neptune, near Hawaii

History

United States
- Name: William H. G. Bullard (1945–1953); Neptune (1953–1991)
- Builder: Pusey & Jones Corp., Wilmington, Delaware
- Launched: 22 August 1945
- Commissioned: 1 June 1953
- Decommissioned: 1973
- In service: 1973
- Out of service: 1 January 1991
- Stricken: 20 August 1992
- Identification: IMO number: 8834897
- Motto: Find it, Fix it, Hide it.
- Fate: Recycled in late 2005
- Notes: Ship underwent modifications as USS Neptune and a major modernization in 1982 with resulting changes in specifications.

General characteristics
- Type: S3-S2-BP1; Army cable ship, later USN Cable Repair Ship (ARC)
- Displacement: 7,400 long tons (7,519 t)
- Length: 362 ft 0 in (110.34 m)
- Beam: 47 ft 0 in (14.33 m)
- Draft: 25 ft (7.6 m)
- Propulsion: 2 × Skinner Uniflow Reciprocating Steam Engines; changed to turbo-electric in 1982; twin shafts
- Speed: 14 knots (26 km/h; 16 mph)
- Complement: Navy: 9 officers, 142 enlisted, civilian specialists; MSC: 71 civilians, 6 Navy, 25 technicians
- Armament: None

USNS Neptune (ARC-2), was the lead ship in her class of cable repair ships in U.S. Naval service. The ship was built by Pusey & Jones Corp. of Wilmington, Delaware, Hull Number 1108, as the William H. G. Bullard named for Rear Adm. William H. G. Bullard. She was the first of two Maritime Commission type S3-S2-BP1 ships built for the US Army Signal Corps near the end of World War II. The other ship was the Albert J. Myer, which later joined her sister ship in naval service as the USNS Albert J. Myer (T-ARC-6). (Note: Albert J. Myer was completed, placed in the reserve fleet but withdrawn 7 February 1952 and transferred to U.S. Army custody for operation as U.S. Army Cable Ship Albert J. Myer until transfer to Navy 13 May 1966.)

The ship was assigned to and largely worked on installation of the Sound Surveillance System (SOSUS) under its unclassified name for installation, Project Caesar.

== Function ==
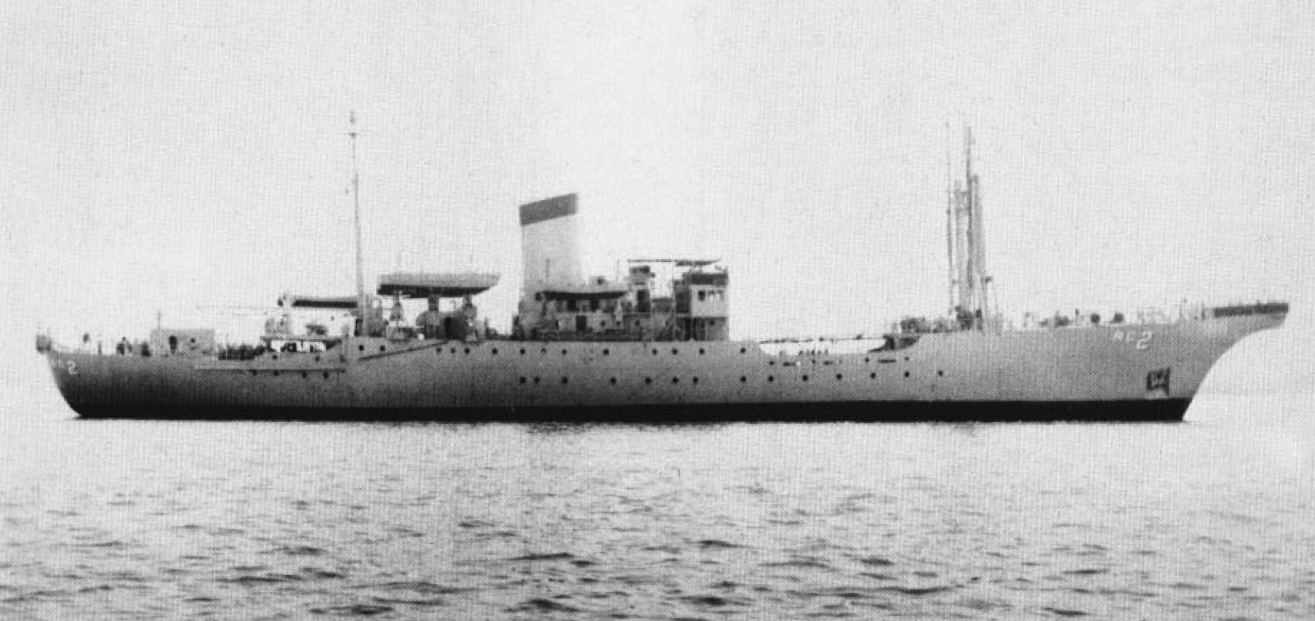
Neptune before substantial modifications. Note almost original bow sheaves and absence of helicopter deck.

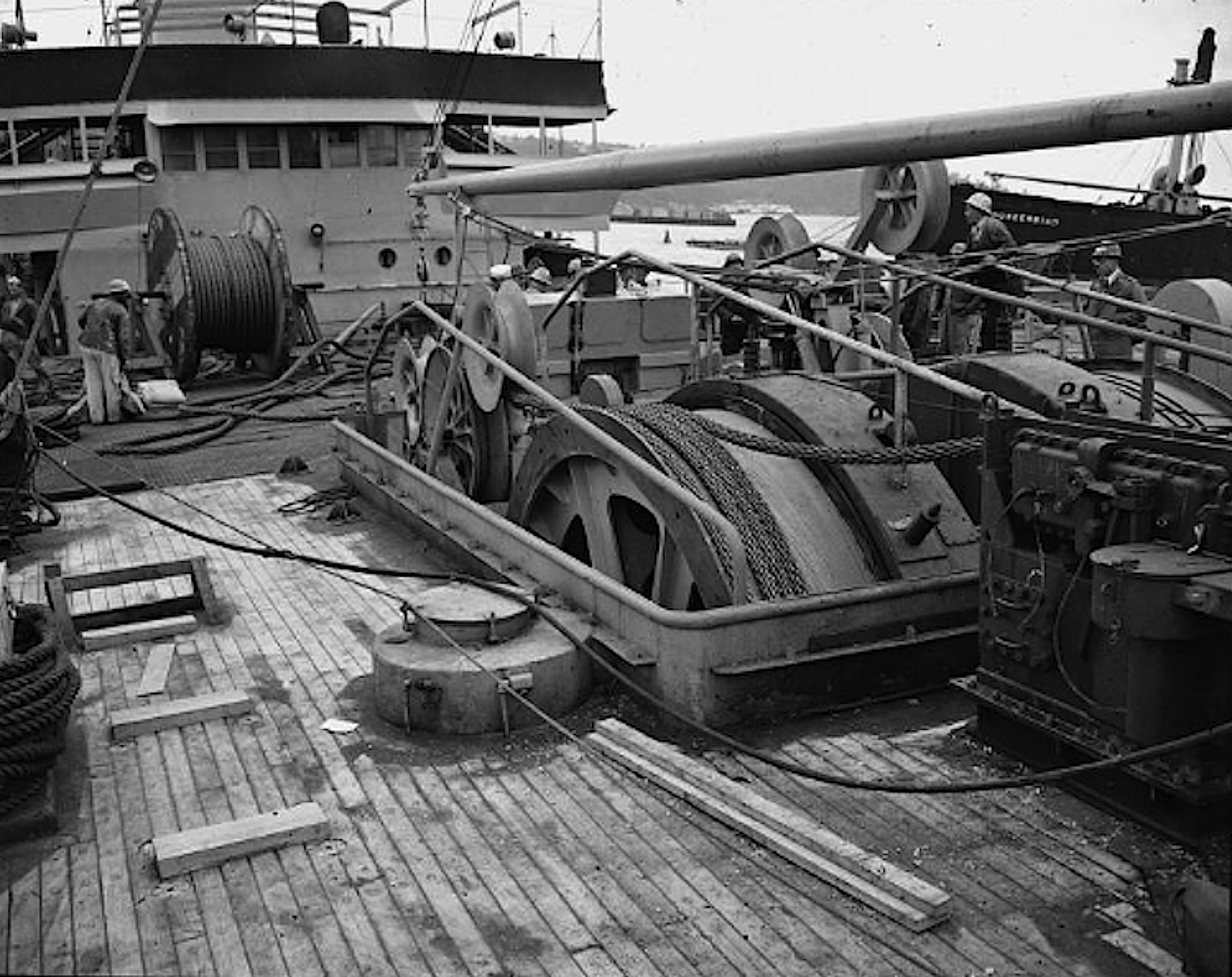
Cable drums from foredeck.

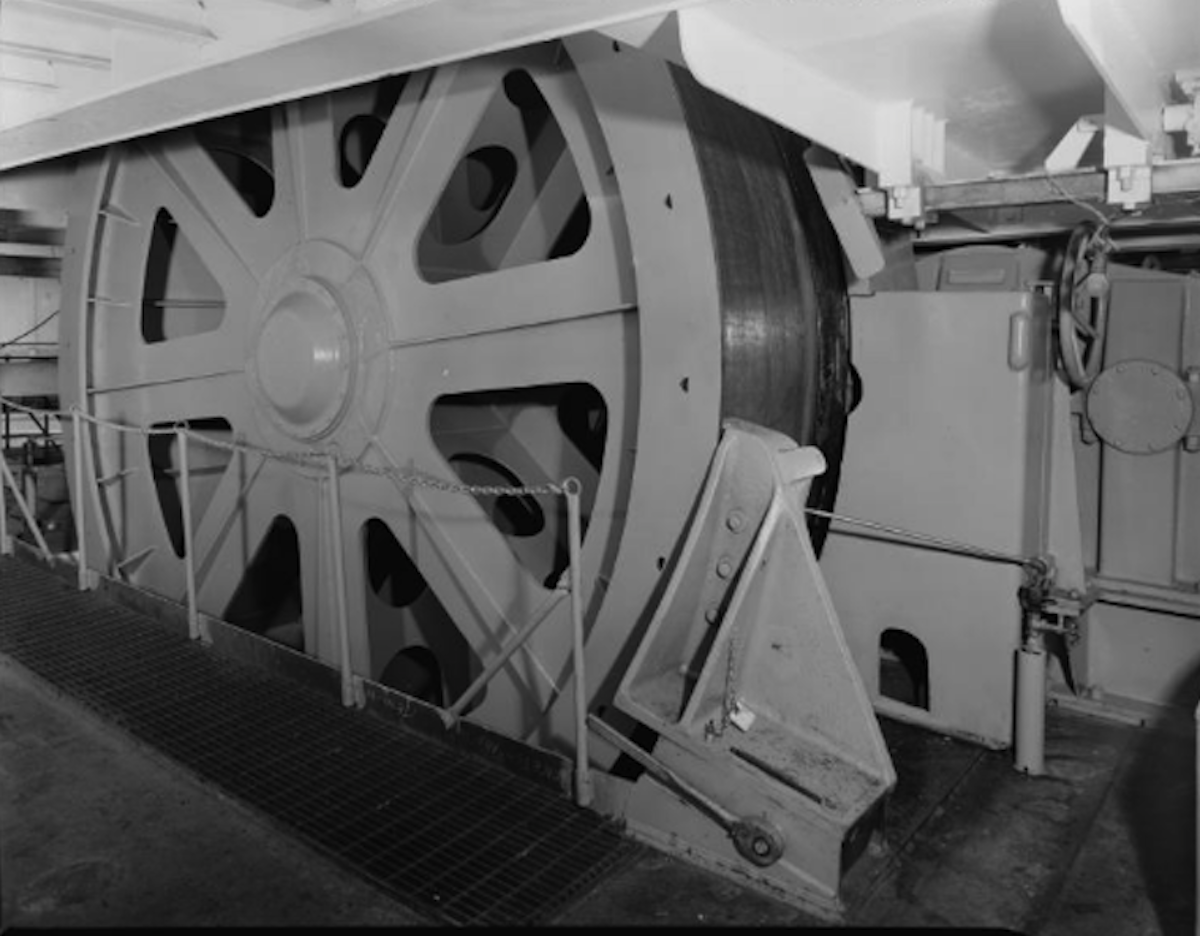
Cable drums from below.

Neptune's assignments were typically to transport, deploy, retrieve and repair submarine cables, tow cable plow (Note: Large devices used to bury cable in coastal areas to protect from damage from trawls and other hazards.) and acoustic projectors, and conduct acoustic, hydrographic, and bathymetric surveys. Civilian cable engineers and specialist were involved during cable or surveying operations in addition to a Navy crew of nine officers and 142 enlisted personnel. (Note: SOSUS and both operations and actual linkage of Project Caesar to SOSUS was at the time classified and tightly controlled. The system was covered as "oceanographic research" and the cable operations were not associated with undersea surveillance systems. Thus any public information, such as the referenced All Hands article, did not describe the true nature of the operations. The All Hands article "Underseas Cable Layer" emphasizes the cover story with the purpose being to connect remote ocean observation centers with shore stations.) In addition to cable operations and surveys for Project Caesar the ship supported experimental efforts and other projects.

== Career ==
After completion for the US Army Signal Corps on 26 February 1946, William H. G. Bullard was delivered to the Maritime Commission and placed in the James River reserve fleet on 2 March 1946.

In 1952 the cable ship was required by the Navy for Project Caesar, the unclassified name for the installation phase of SOSUS. The system's mission was declassified in 1991. On 17 February 1953 the ship was withdrawn from the reserve fleet, transferred to Navy custody and named Neptune. The ship then went to the Bethlehem Steel Co. in Baltimore, Maryland for a number of modifications: e.g., electric cable machinery (in place of steam), precision navigation instrumentation, and a helicopter platform over the fantail. Cable drums 15 ft (4.6 m) in diameter and bow sheaves spanning 12 ft (3.7 m) were among the more visible modifications. On 1 June 1953 the ship was commissioned USS Neptune (ARC-2).

The ship's operations were classified so few specific ones are public. One was the 1962 connection of the array once terminating at Naval Facility Cape May to Naval Facility Lewes necessitated by destruction of the Cape May shore station in the "Ash Wednesday" Storm. (Note: To preserve secrecy the shore terminals operated under the cover of "oceanographic research" and were designated by the generic term "Naval Facility" until most had been decommissioned in system consolidation and before declassification. See SOSUS.)

From December 1965 through March 1966 Neptune was overhauled in Boston. In 1973, Neptune transferred to the Military Sealift Command (MSC), was re-designated T-ARC-2, and continued operations with an MSC civil service crew.

Only two of the four cable ships available for Project Caesar had been designed and built as cable ships, the others being conversions and lacking some critical features needed for cable operations. The larger Aeolus and Thor were not suitable for modernization while Albert J. Myer and Neptune had cable ship features, including deeper draft than the larger ships, that made them suitable candidates for modernization. In hearings for the 1980 appropriations the Navy requested an increase of $9.6 million over an original estimate of $14.5 million in Neptune conversion budget for a total of $24.1 million. The revised estimate was based on actual Myer conversion costs. In particular the Navy was questioned about conversion of merchant type hulls to cable ships and answered that conversion would be more expensive. Further, charter of commercial cable ships was done when needed, but expensive and those ships were not always available when required. The AT&T CS Long Lines was used on occasion to lay trunk cable at a daily cost of $30,000 vice Neptune's $19,200. Scheduled Project Caesar work required a minimum of three Navy cable ships.

Neptune was extensively modernized in 1982 by General Dynamics Corporation in Quincy, Massachusetts. (Note: See photos before and after modernization.) That work included new turbo-electric engines. Neptune and sister ship Albert J. Myer, with Skinner Uniflow Reciprocating Steam Engines, were the last ships in the Navy to operate using reciprocating steam engines.

Neptune performed cable repair duties all over the world until 1991, when she'd been in service for some 38 years. During her career, she received a Navy E ribbon in 1988.

Inactivated in 1991, the same year in which the SOSUS mission was declassified, she was placed in the James River reserve fleet near Ft. Eustis, VA on 24 September 1991. The ex-Neptune was removed from the fleet 6 December 1994 to stripped. The ship was dismantled and recycled by International Shipbreaking Ltd. of Brownsville, TX in late 2005.
