= 240 Vanadis =

Main-belt asteroid

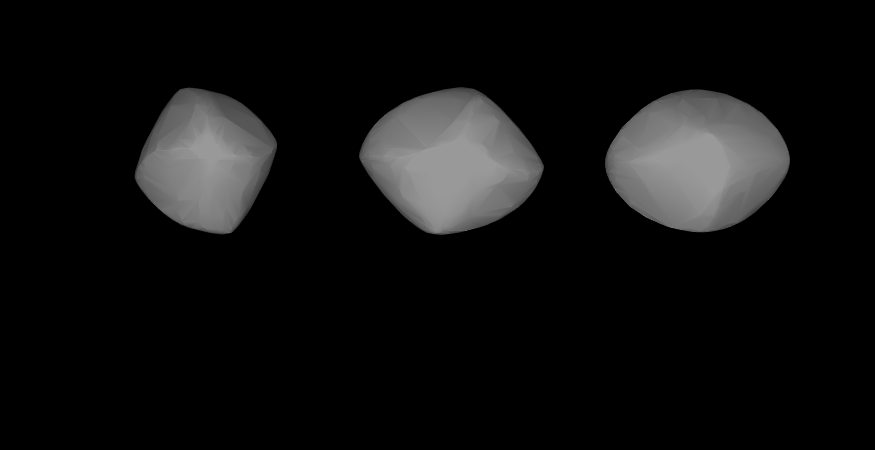
- Lightcurve-based 3D model of 240 Vanadis

Discovery
- Discovered by: Alphonse Borrelly
- Discovery date: 27 August 1884

Designations
- Pronunciation: /ˈvɑːnə.dɪs/
- Named after: Freyja
- Alternative designations: A884 QB
- Minor planet category: Main belt

Orbital characteristics
- Epoch 31 July 2016 (JD 2457600.5)
- Uncertainty parameter 0
- Observation arc: 131.61 yr (48072 d)
- Aphelion: 3.2134 AU (480.72 Gm)
- Perihelion: 2.1178 AU (316.82 Gm)
- Semi-major axis: 2.6656 AU (398.77 Gm)
- Eccentricity: 0.20551
- Orbital period (sidereal): 4.35 yr (1,589.6 d)
- Average orbital speed: 18.25 km/s
- Mean anomaly: 60.5202°
- Mean motion: 0° 13^{m} 35.292^{s} / day
- Inclination: 2.1043°
- Longitude of ascending node: 115.191°
- Argument of perihelion: 300.174°

Physical characteristics
- Dimensions: 94.03±5.37 km (composite estimate); 103.90±2.5 km
- Mass: (6.7±1.6)×10^{17} kg (Note: Calculated from its standard gravitational parameter GM = 0.045±0.011 km^{3}/s^{2}.)
- Mean density: 1.88 g/cm^{3} (Note: Assuming a diameter of 87.9 km.)
- Synodic rotation period: 10.64 h (0.443 d)
- Geometric albedo: 0.0411±0.002
- Spectral type: C
- Absolute magnitude (H): 9.00

240 Vanadis is a fairly large main-belt asteroid with a diameter of around 100 km. It was discovered by Alphonse Borrelly on August 27, 1884, in Marseille and was named after Freyja (Vanadis), the Norse fertility goddess. The asteroid is orbiting the Sun at a distance of 2.67 AU with a period of 4.35 yr and an orbital eccentricity of 0.206. The orbital plane is inclined at an angle of 2.10° to the plane of the ecliptic.

Photometric observations of the asteroid made during 2022 were used to produce a light curve that showed a rotation period of 10.565±0.002 h with a brightness variation of 0.07±0.01 in magnitude. This is consistent with earlier estimates. It is very dark and is classified as a C-type asteroid, probably composed of primitive carbonaceous material.
