= USS Indianapolis (ID-3865) =

Cargo ship that served in the United States Navy

History

United States
- Name: USS Indianapolis
- Namesake: The city of Indianapolis, Indiana (previous name retained)
- Builder: Pusey and Jones, Gloucester City, Camden County, New Jersey
- Launched: 4 July 1918
- Completed: 1918
- Acquired: 12 December 1918
- Commissioned: 12 December 1918
- Decommissioned: 9 July 1919
- Stricken: 9 July 1919
- Fate: Returned to United States Shipping Board, 9 July 1919
- Notes: Built for United States Shipping Board as SS Indianapolis in 1918; in Shipping Board custody as SS Indianapolis from 1919

General characteristics
- Type: Cargo ship
- Displacement: 16,900 tons
- Length: 439 ft 6 in (133.96 m)
- Beam: 60 ft 0 in (18.29 m)
- Draft: 28 ft 0.5 in (8.547 m)
- Speed: 11 knots
- Complement: 70

The first USS Indianapolis was a cargo ship that served in the United States Navy from 1918 to 1919.

SS Indianapolis was launched on 4 July 1918 by Pusey and Jones, Gloucester City, Camden County, New Jersey, for the United States Shipping Board. She was delivered to the U.S. Department of the Navy on 12 December 1918 and was commissioned into the U.S. Navy as USS Indianapolis the same day at the Philadelphia Navy Yard, Philadelphia, Pennsylvania.

Attached to the Naval Overseas Transportation Service, Indianapolis departed Philadelphia on 28 December 1918 to carry cargo to England and the Netherlands. She returned to the United States at Norfolk, Virginia, on 23 February 1919. She departed Norfolk on 31 March 1919, carried cargo to France, and returned to Norfolk on 22 June 1919.

Indianapolis decommissioned on 9 July 1919. She was returned to the United States Shipping Board at Norfolk the same day, once again becoming SS Indianapolis.

1918 Photo the "Indianapolis" can be seen under construction from Pusey and Jones Corporation photograph collection Hagley Museum and Library, Wilmington, DE 19807.
