= USS Aeolus (ARC-3) =

Attack cargo ship converted into a cable repair ship

Coordinates: 34°16.685′N 76°38.659′W

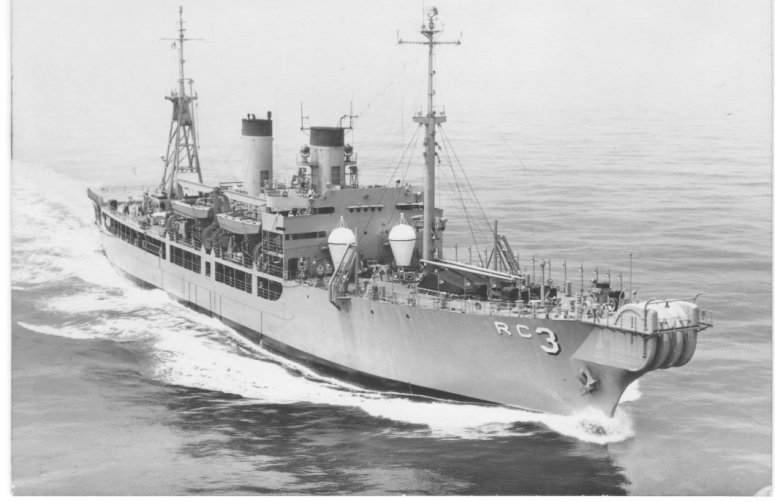
- Aeolus

History
- Name: Aeolus
- Namesake: Aeolus, Greek god of winds
- Builder: Walsh-Kaiser Company, Providence, Rhode Island
- Laid down: 29 March 1945
- Launched: 20 May 1945
- Recommissioned: 14 March 1955
- Decommissioned: 1 October 1973
- In service: 1 October 1973
- Out of service: May 1985
- Reclassified: T-ARC-3 1973
- Stricken: 28 March 1985
- Motto: Ubique (Latin: "Everywhere")
- Fate: Sunk as artificial reef 29 July 1988

General characteristics
- Class & type: Artemis-class attack cargo ship
- Type: S4–SE2–BE1
- Displacement: 4,087 long tons (4,153 t) light; 7,080 long tons (7,194 t) full
- Length: 438 ft (134 m)
- Beam: 58 ft (18 m)
- Draft: 19 ft (5.8 m)
- Propulsion: Turbo-electric, two shafts
- Speed: 16.9 knots (31.3 km/h; 19.4 mph)
- Complement: Navy: 205; MSC: 80 civilians, 2 navy; Navy or MSC: Civilian cable & survey personnel as required

USS Aeolus (ARC-3) began service as USS Turandot (AKA-47), an Artemis-class attack cargo ship built by the Walsh-Kaiser Co., Inc. of Providence, Rhode Island. In 1954 she was converted into a cable repair ship to support Project Caesar, the unclassified name for installation of the Sound Surveillance System SOSUS. Aeolus was the first of two ships, the other being USS Thor (ARC-4), to be converted into cable ships. Aeolus performed cable duties for nearly thirty years, from 1955 to 1973 as a commissioned ship and from 1973 until 1985 as the civilian crewed USNS Aeolus (T-ARC-3) of the Military Sealift Command (MSC). The ship was retired in 1985 and sunk as an artificial reef in 1988.

== USS Turandot (AKA-47) ==
USS Turandot was decommissioned on 21 March 1946, struck from the Navy list on 17 April 1947, and placed in the reserve fleet on 25 June.

== USS Aeolus (ARC-3) ==
On 4 November 1954 the ship was removed from the reserve fleet for conversion to a cable repair ship. The conversion was performed at the Key Highway yard of the Bethlehem Steel Co. in Baltimore, Maryland. The ship was renamed Aeolus, designated ARC-3, on 17 March 1955 and commissioned on 14 May 1955. The Navy crew consisted of nine officers and 196 enlisted personnel with civilian cable or survey personnel as required.

== Function ==
Aeolus was converted to support the installation of the Sound Surveillance System and other defense cable projects. The system and name were at the time classified with the unclassified name Project Caesar being given to the installation and support of the system. The ship was principally used to transport, deploy, retrieve and repair cables and to conduct acoustic, hydrographic, and bathymetric surveys under Project Caesar. Civilian specialists were involved during cable or surveying operations for the technical work. (Note: SOSUS and both operations and actual linkage of Project Caesar to SOSUS was at the time classified and tightly controlled. The system was covered as "oceanographic research" and the cable operations were not associated with undersea surveillance systems. Thus any public information, such as the referenced All Hands articles, did not describe the true nature of the operations. The All Hands January 1964 article emphasizes the cover story with the purpose being to connect remote ocean observation centers with shore stations.)

Aeolus cable tank, 1953.}

The Aeolus and Thor had three 34 ft (10.4 m) diameter cable tanks each with a capacity of about 20 nmi (23 mi; 37 km) of five-inch armored cable or 250 nmi (290 mi; 460 km) of coaxial cable. (Note: See USS Aeolus Association's photo of Caesar cable types.) Cable being laid was under constant test by civilian experts in the ships cable test room. Cable ships with bow sheaves only required towing astern for some long runs of cable resulting in the unusual feature of two sets of running lights suitable for the stern becoming the effective bow.

By the late 1970s the two Artemis class transports converted to cable ships were in need of modernization or replacement. Some shortcomings in design worked against modernization even though two other ships of the same age were slated for major modernization. The class had been designed with a relatively shallow draft of 16 ft (4.9 m), least draft of the attack transports that had drafts from 26 ft (7.9 m) to 28 ft (8.5 m). (Note: A 10 ft (3.0 m) lesser draft might have some advantages in an attack transport allowing closer approach to beaches.) Compared to the 25 ft (7.6 m) draft of the smaller Albert J. Myer and Neptune, designed as an Army cable layers late in World War II and the only Navy ships designed as cable ships, this was a disadvantage in a cable ship's loading and operations. Both of those ships, built the same year and as old, were essentially rebuilt to extend their service life but the two larger ships were not going to be modernized. The shallow draft, which also hindered bathymetric survey work due to shallow transducer depth, and large sail area of the exposed hull and superstructure made stopped or very low speed cable operations hazardous. Thrusters could not be built into the shallow draft hulls and tugs had to be used for some operations. The ships had no stern cable capability and could not effectively be modernized for that capability. Finally, the ships could not carry a full load of cable and a full load of fuel without exceeding maximum draft limits and modernization would only add to that limitation by adding weight.

== Service history ==
Aeolus viewed from bow sheaves.

Aeolus worked in the Atlantic and Caribbean during 1955–56; in the Pacific during 1956–59; and returned to the Atlantic and Caribbean during 1959–62. During 1962–73 she worked principally in the Atlantic, with occasional temporary assignments to the Pacific.

In early 1973 the ship underwent a ten-month refit at the Boston Naval Shipyard in anticipation of transfer to the Military Sealift Command (MSC) later that year. new, up to date, cable machinery along with ship's service generators and auxiliary equipment was installed. The distilling plant was replaced by a new, larger capacity, system. The engineering plant and boilers were overhauled. Changes to both ship's work and habitable spaces addressed work and habitability issues.

On 23 November 1969 the ship began recovering the SNAP-7E nuclear power source off Bermuda. The ship had deployed the nuclear powered acoustic source, built for the Navy by the United States Atomic Energy Commission (AEC), in 1964 in 16,000 ft (4,876.8 m) of water with two anchors (one 6,000 pounds (2,700 kg) the other 2,000 pounds (910 kg)) connected to the device by 4 nmi (4.6 mi; 7.4 km) of line. SNAP-7E had failed prematurely and the AEC had requested recovery for examination to identify the failure. Aeolus, on the third pass over the line connecting the lighter anchor to the device, began retrieval. The heavy lift was successful with a maximum tension of 104,000 pounds (47,000 kg). The device was checked for radiation leaks before being secured on board for transport to a facility in Rhode Island.

After returning from European waters on 21 September 1973 the ship was prepared for decommissioning and turn over to the MSC. On 1 October 1973 Aeolus was transferred to MSC operating with a civilian crew as USNS Aeolus (T-ARC-3) until May 1985 when deactivated for lay up in the Maritime Administration's National Defense Reserve Fleet in the James River near Ft. Eustis, Virginia.

During her career, Aeolus received three Meritorious Unit Commendations (in 1970, 1971, and 1973).

== Artificial reef ==
On 28 January 1987 the ship was transferred to the State of North Carolina for sinking as an artificial reef. On 29 July 1988 the ex-Aeolus was sunk to form an artificial reef located about 22 miles from Beaufort Inlet in 110 feet (30 m) of water, is often visited by divers. The ship was intact lying on its starboard side until Hurricane Fran in 1996 when the wreck was shifted and broken into three major pieces with scattered wreckage.

== See also ==
SOSUS
