= USS Portunus (ARC-1) =

1944 LSM-1-class landing ship medium

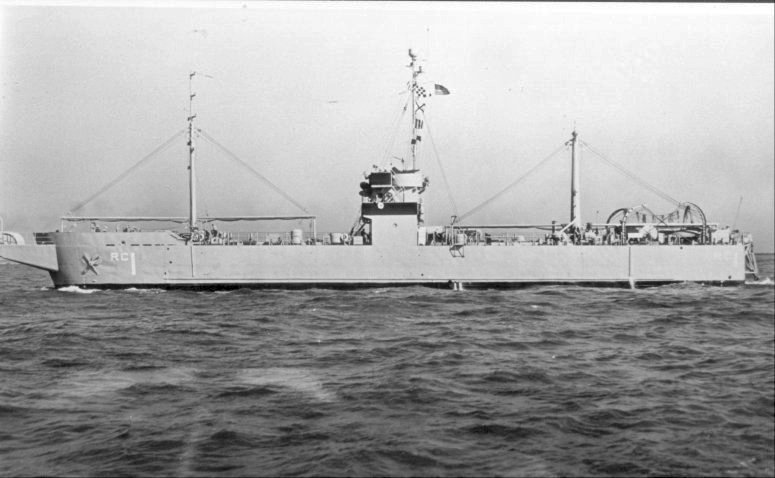

History

United States
- Name: LSM–275 (1944—1953); Portunus (1953—1959)
- Laid down: 1 August 1944
- Launched: 11 September 1944
- Commissioned: 6 October 1944
- Decommissioned: 30 April 1959
- Stricken: 1 May 1959
- Fate: Transferred to Portugal, 16 November 1959.

Portugal
- Name: Medusa (1959—1969); São Rafael (1969—1976)
- Acquired: 16 November 1959
- Renamed: July 1969
- Reclassified: "Albacora" class submarine support ship July 1969
- Fate: disarmed, disposed of 1976

General characteristics
- Class & type: LSM-1-class landing ship medium
- Displacement: 1,095 tons (f.)
- Length: 203 ft 6 in (62.03 m)
- Beam: 34 ft 6 in (10.52 m)
- Draft: 7 ft 4 in (2.24 m)
- Speed: 12 knots (22 km/h; 14 mph)
- Complement: 59
- Armament: 1 × 40 mm gun; 4 × 20 mm guns

USS Portunus (ARC-1) was an LSM-1-class landing ship medium acquired by the U.S. Navy for use during World War II as a landing craft for troops, and later, as a cable repair ship.

On 16 November 1959, the ship was transferred to Portugal to become the NRP Medusa until modified during 1964 into a Marine Support Ship and assigned to the Guinea-Bissau Maritime Defense Command. In July 1969, the ship was renamed São Rafael and redesignated as an Albacora-class submarine support ship. São Rafael was disarmed and disposed of in 1976.

== U.S. Navy ==
Portunus was laid down by the Federal Shipbuilding and Drydock Co., Kearny, New Jersey, as LSM–275 1 August 1944; launched 11 September 1944; and commissioned 6 October 1944.

=== World War II ===
After shakedown off Norfolk, Virginia, LSM–275 steamed for Key West, Florida, the Panama Canal, and San Diego, California, before reaching Pearl Harbor on 28 January 1945.

After a trip to Guam, she steamed from Pearl Harbor in task unit TU 51.13.4 via Eniwetok and Saipan to Okinawa to land troops and supplies on the "last stepping stone" to Japan. Departing in TU 51.29.22, 25 April while the battle for Okinawa was still going on, she steamed via Saipan to Ulithi, arriving 5 May. Departing 28 June, she then put into Tulagi, the Russells, Eniwetok, Guam, and Saipan, before reaching Pearl Harbor 19 August, 5 days after the war's end.

On 4 December, she departed Pearl Harbor for San Diego. She steamed between San Diego, San Pedro, and San Francisco during the first half of 1946, then reported to Com 19th Fleet at San Diego 18 September, underwent inactivation overhaul, and decommissioned 21 April 1947 at San Pedro.

=== Recommissioned as a cable-laying ship ===
Ordered activated in 1951, LSM–275 was redesignated as a cable-laying and repair ship ARC–1 on 14 December, and recommissioned 2 July 1952. She operated off California ports for the next 11 months, then, on 1 June 1953, got underway for the U.S. East Coast. The ship was named Portunus 13 July 1953. Attached to the 3rd Naval District, she laid cable off Cape May, New Jersey, and off Bermuda before conducting ocean-bottom surveys and cable operations off Colombia's Atlantic and Pacific coasts, 13 October to 31 October.

Returning to New York City, Portunus underwent overhaul, and on 8 March 1954, resumed cable operations, first in the approaches to New York, off Sandy Hook, New Jersey, then off Bermuda. From 1955 to 1959, she continued to lay cable, off Key West, Sandy Hook, Bermuda, Wood Island, Maine, and Nantucket Island, and in the Narragansett area, and off Little Creek, Virginia. During this time, she continued to base at the New York Shipyard, Brooklyn, and to periodically pick up cable at Newington, New Hampshire.

=== Decommissioning ===
She was decommissioned at New York City on 30 April 1959, and her name was struck from the Navy List on 1 May 1959. Portunus earned one battle star for World War II service.

== Portuguese Navy ==
The cable-repair vessel was transferred to Portugal under the Military Assistance Program, with delivery on 16 November 1959. The ship was commissioned in the Portuguese Navy 18 November 1959 as Medusa with designation A 5214. On 24 September 1964, the ship was transferred to the Arsenal do Alfeite to be modified into a marine support ship. After modification, she was assigned to the Guinea-Bissau Maritime Defense Command. In July 1969, the ship was renamed São Rafael and reclassified as an Albacora-class submarine support ship. The ship was disarmed and disposed of by the Portuguese Navy in 1976.
