= SV Mandalay =

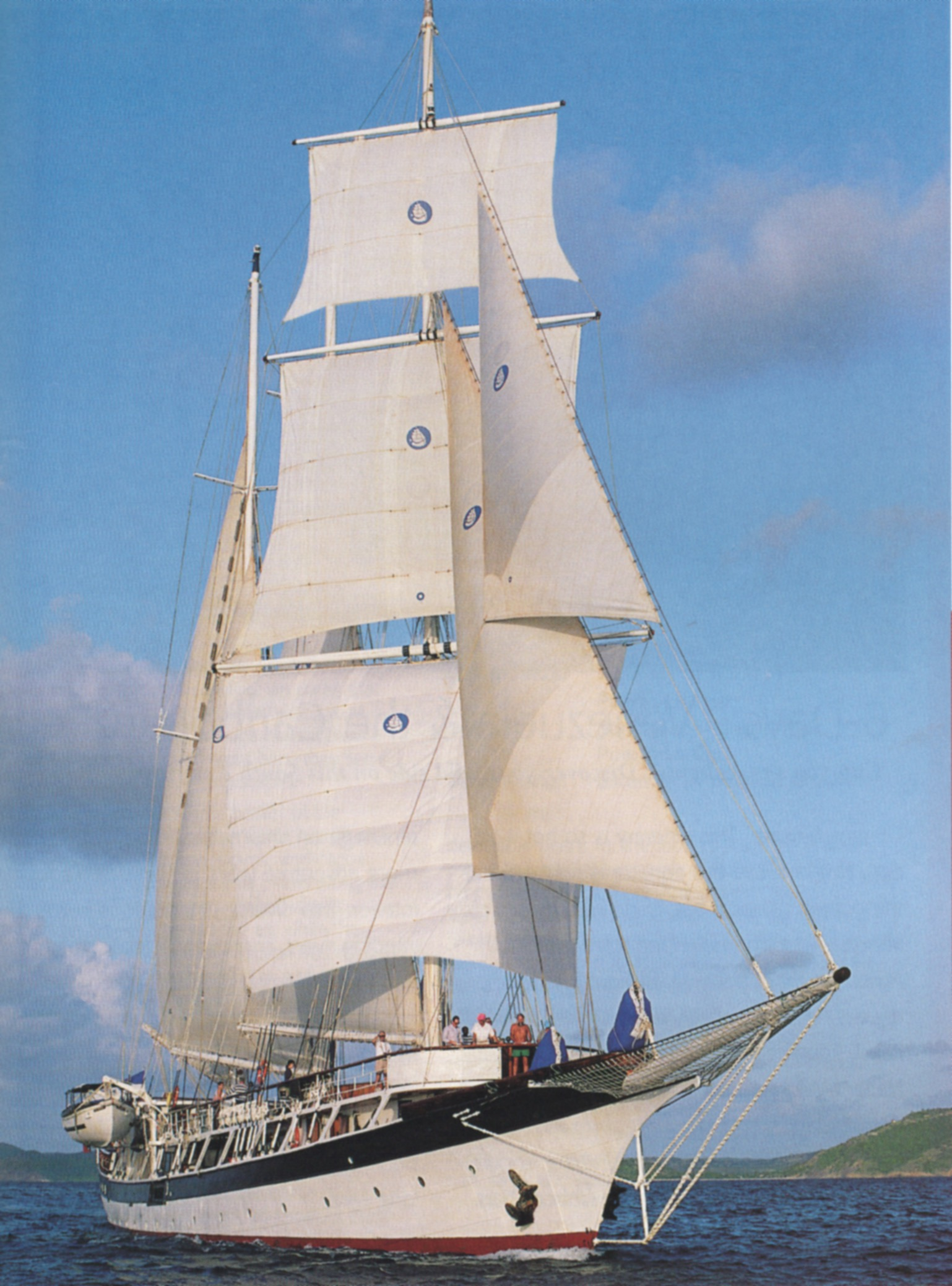

History
- Name: 1923 Hussar; 1934: Vema; 1953: Vema; 1982: Mandalay
- Owner: 1923: Edward Francis Hutton; 1934: Georg Ungar Vettlesen; 1953: Columbia University; 1982: Windjammer Barefoot Cruises; 2013: Mandalay Maritime, SA
- Operator: 1953–1981: Lamont–Doherty Earth Observatory
- Builder: Burmeister & Wain, Copenhagen, Denmark
- Launched: February 2, 1923
- Completed: March 1923, rebuilt 1942 (USN), 1952 (Louis Kenedy, NS Canada), 196? (Lamont Geological Observatory), 1981 (Mike Burke, Windjammer Barefoot Cruises), 2010 (Angermeyer Cruises, Ecuador)
- Identification: IMO number: 7738383; MMSI number: 677057200; Callsign: 5IM672
- Status: Laid up

General characteristics
- Type: schooner
- Tonnage: 585 GRT
- Length: 49.9 m (163 ft 9 in) (pp)
- Beam: 10.1 m (33 ft 2 in)
- Depth: 15 m (49 ft 3 in)
- Decks: three
- Propulsion: 900 bhp (670 kW) V12 GM diesel circa 1942
- Speed: 16 knots (30 km/h; 18 mph) under full sail
- Capacity: 72 passengers (as Mandalay)
- Crew: about 28 (as Mandalay)

SV Mandalay is a three-masted schooner measuring 163.75 ft (49.91 m) pp, with a wrought iron hull. It was built as the private yacht Hussar (IV), and would later become the research vessel Vema, one of the world's most productive oceanographic research vessels. The ship currently sails as the cruising yacht Mandalay in the Caribbean.

== E.F. Hutton's luxury yacht, Hussar IV ==
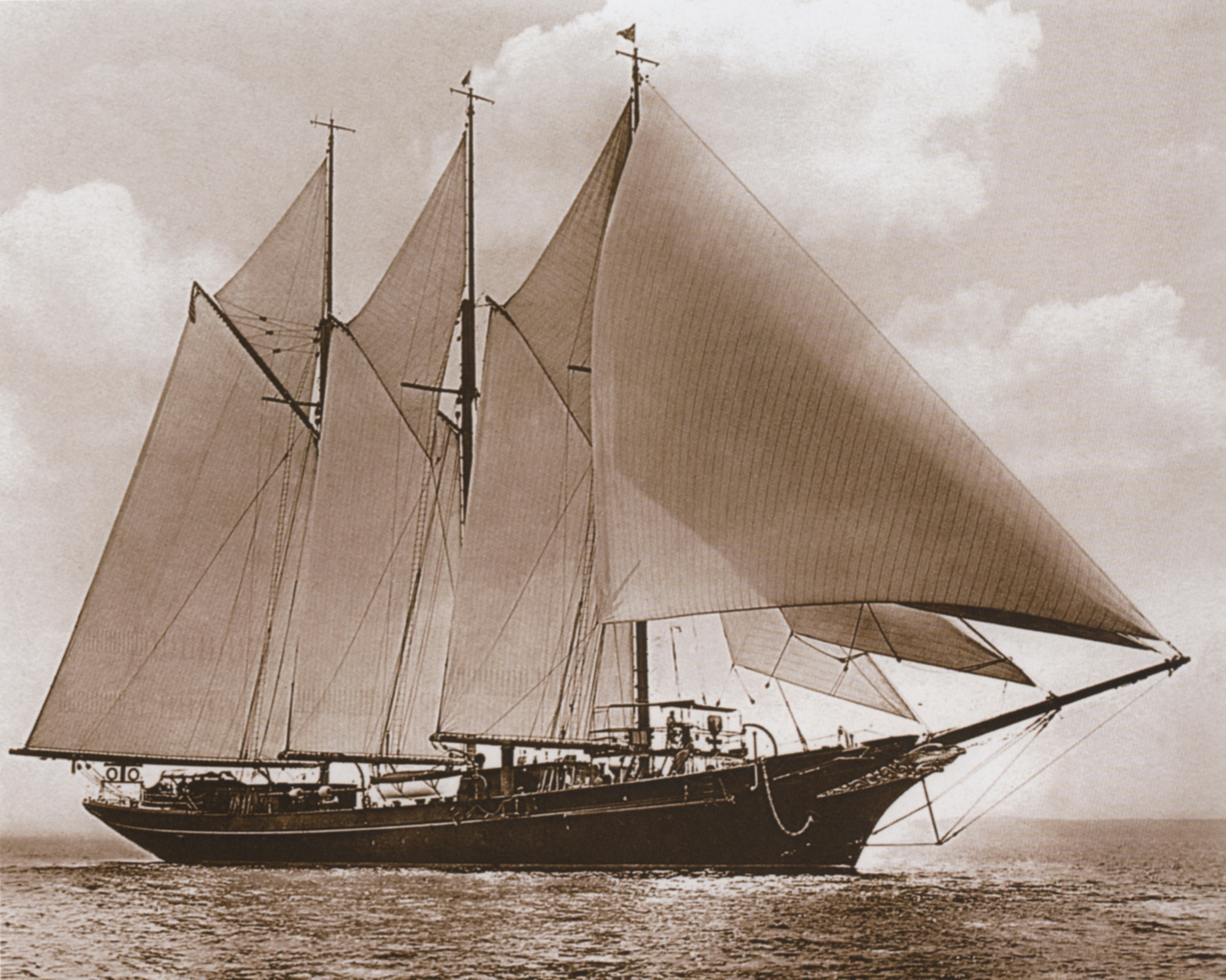
Yacht Hussar IV in the 1920s

Hussar (IV) was designed by Cox & Stevens and built in 1923 by Burmeister & Wain in Copenhagen for E. F. Hutton and his wife Marjorie Merriweather Post. The 585-ton luxury yacht had an iron-hull and represented the epitome of maritime luxury and glamour in her class. Interiors were designed by William Baumgarten & Co of New York, the first American firm to do the interior decoration of a ship abroad. Upon her completion in Denmark King Christian X was invited to inspect the ship prior to its maiden crossing to New York. It was one of the fastest yachts, breaking the transatlantic record in 10 days, 21 hours. The yacht was affiliated with the New York Yacht Club, and spent the winters in the Florida Keys with frequent guests such as actress Billie Burke and Broadway impresario Florenz Ziegfeld, a fellow New Yorker whom Hutton liked to deep sea fish with.

Parlor circa 1923

Dining Room circa 1923

Deck plan circa 1923

Profile of Hussar IV

== Norwegian yacht, Vema ==
In the late 1920s the Huttons decided they wanted a larger yacht, so they commissioned the construction of Hussar (V) (later Sea Cloud). Hussar IV was put up for sale in September 1930, and eventually sold to Norwegian shipping magnate, G. Unger Vetlesen and his wife Maude Monell and renamed Vema, a combination of Vetlesen and Maude.

== U.S. WWII Service ==
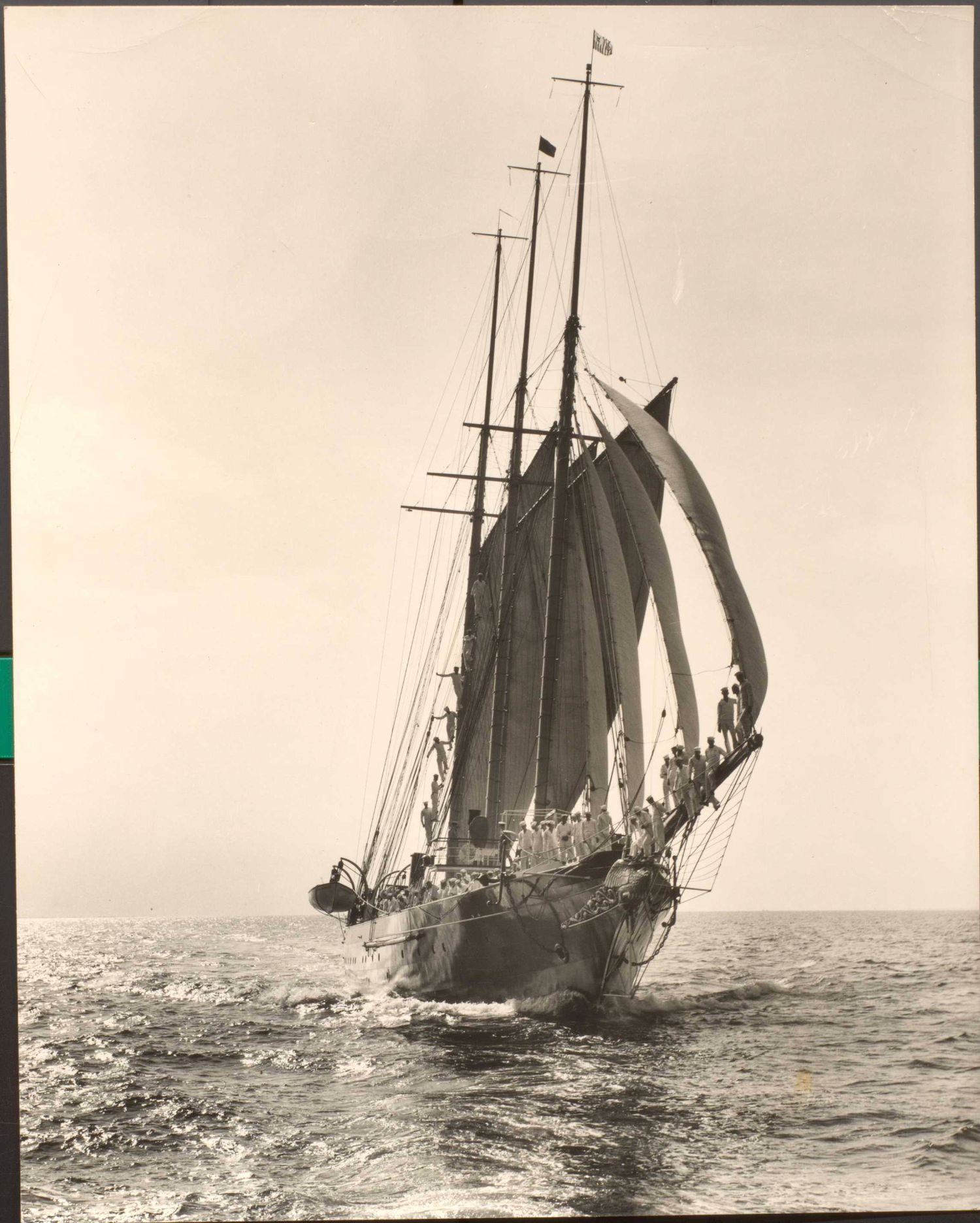
Vema during World War II with Merchant Marine trainees

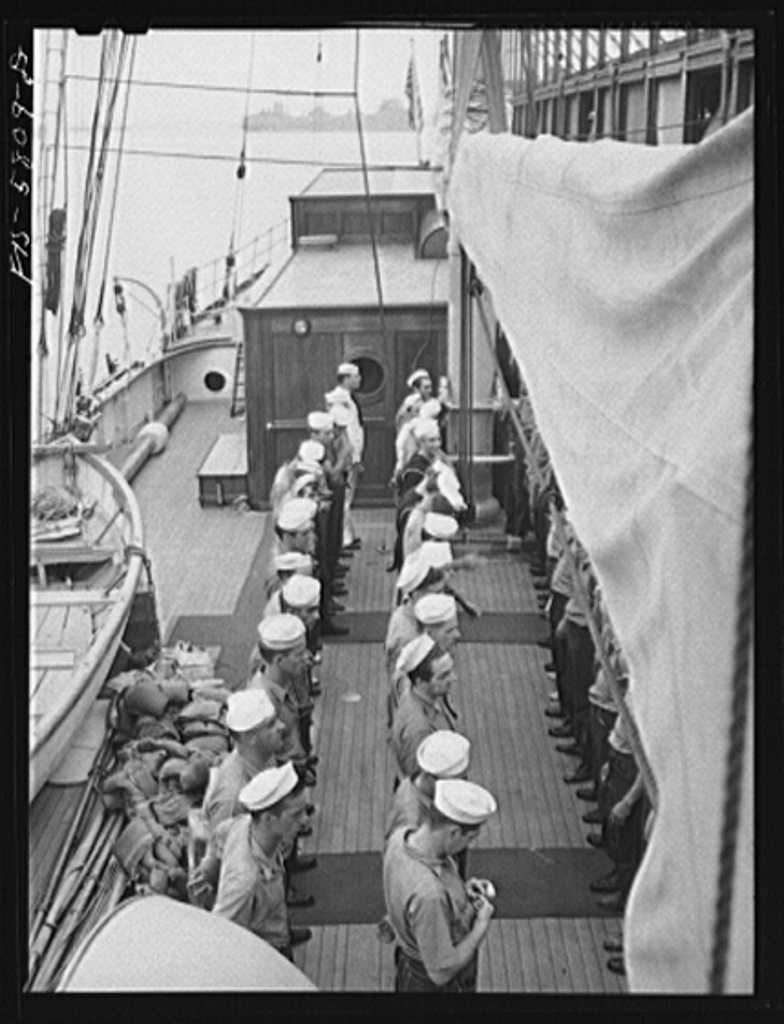
Trainees aboard Vema, July 1942

During World War II, Maude Monell donated Vema to the American war effort. The vessel was put into service as a barracks and training ship for United States Merchant Marine cadets, deployed patrolling coastal waters for the United States Coast Guard. Assigned to the US Maritime Service Training Station on Hoffman Island, her sailing area was listed as 14,000 sqf. After the war she was abandoned off Staten Island until Louis Kenedy, a captain from Nova Scotia, salvaged the vessel. LDEO leased the vessel in 1953 and soon bought her for $100,000.

== Research vessel Vema ==
Vema fracture zone

Vema started circling the globe as the first of the Lamont Geological Observatory research vessels (now the Lamont–Doherty Earth Observatory [LDEO]), a research unit of Columbia University. Displaying a black hull, she was used to collect samples of seawater and sediment cores, measure currents and heat flows, perform underwater photography and seismic studies, and map out ocean floors. The work on the ship helped to confirm the continental drift theory. By the time of her retirement in 1981, the Vema had collected data on a record track of 1,225,000 nautical miles (2,269,000 km). Notable scientists who worked aboard the Vema include Maurice Ewing, Bruce C. Heezen, Ralph (Ralphy) Roessler, J. Lamar Worzel, Jack Nafe, Frank Press, and Walter Pitman, all of whose work was greatly facilitated by Marine Technical Coordinator Robert Gerard, who was responsible for the fitting and refitting of LDEO marine research vessels from the Vema through her successors, the Conrad, Eltanin, and RV Maurice Ewing, including the design and installation of numerous pieces of customized scientific measurement equipment critical to their research.

=== Seafloor features ===
- The Vema was instrumental in the exploration of the Mid-Atlantic Ridge. The Vema fracture zone, crossing the Mid-Atlantic Ridge at 10.726°N 42.333°W, was named for her. G.R. Hamilton aboard RV Vema discovered this feature in 1956.
- Vema Trench in the Indian Ocean is in fact a fracture zone named trench to avoid confusion with the Vema Fracture Zone in the Atlantic Ocean mentioned above. Vema Trench crosses the Central Indian Ridge at 8.98°S 67.57°E. RV Vema discovered it in 1958.
- During the seafloor explorations the Vema Seamount was discovered in 1959; the seamount rises from a depth of almost 5,000 meters to just 11 meters below sea level, and is located in the South Atlantic about 1,000 km west-north-west of Cape Town, at 31°38′S 8°20′E.
- Vema Knoll at 23°40′N 66°58′W and Vema Gap at 23°30′N 67°00′W are located adjacent to each other, 500 km north of Puerto Rico.
- The Vema Channel is a deep trough in the Rio Grande Rise of the South Atlantic at 31.3°S 39.4°W. Discovered during one of Vema's journeys, it has a depth of 4,646 m and a width of 18 km, serving as a conduit for the Antarctic Bottom Water and Weddell Sea bottom water.

==== Other research vessels of the LDEO ====
- USNS Robert D. Conrad, 1962–1989
- USNS Eltanin, 1962–1974
- RV Maurice Ewing, 1988–2005
- RV Marcus G. Langseth, from 2004

== Cruising yacht Mandalay ==
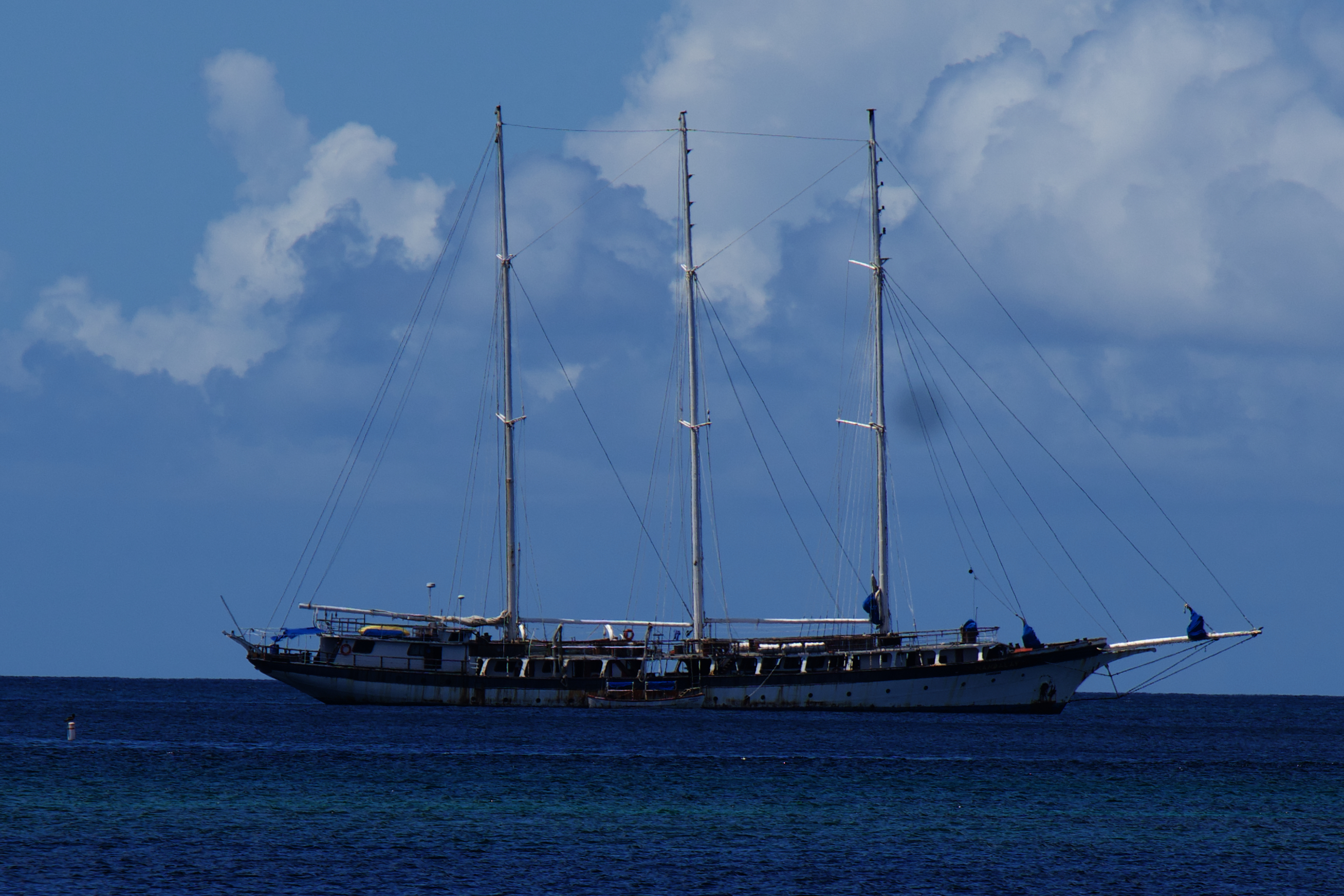
Out of commission in Grenada, St George Anchorage

The ship was refitted again as a cruising yacht for the Caribbean under the name SV Mandalay (also Mandalay of Tortola) with a sail area of > 20,000 square feet (1,900 m^{2}). The ship was operated by Windjammer Barefoot Cruises from 1982 until the operator went out of business in 2008. Mandalay subsequently was purchased at auction, refurbished, and used as specialty cruise ship in the Galapagos islands off Ecuador by Angermeyer Cruises.

The Mandalay later sailed weekly out of Grenada for one and two-week cruises in the Grenadines for Sail Windjammer, Inc. However, Sail Windjammer announced in early 2021 that the company would be ceasing operations due to the financial impact of the COVID-19 pandemic and damage to Mandalay.
