= Missile Impact Location System =

Underwater acoustic positioning system for US Air Force missile testing ranges

The Missile Impact Location System or Missile Impact Locating System (MILS) (Note: Both full names are found in references.) is an ocean acoustic detection system designed to locate the impact position of test missile nose cones at the ocean's surface and then the position of the cone itself for recovery from the ocean bottom. The systems were installed in the missile test ranges managed by the U.S. Air Force.

The systems were first installed in the Eastern Range, at the time the Atlantic Missile Range, and secondly in the Pacific, then known as the Pacific Missile Range. The Atlantic Missile Impact Location System and Pacific Missile Impact Location System were installed from 1958 through 1960. Design and development was by American Telephone and Telegraph Company (AT&T), with its Bell Laboratories research and Western Electric manufacturing elements and was to an extent based on the company's technology and experience developing and deploying the Navy's then-classified Sound Surveillance System (SOSUS). Early studies at Bell Laboratories' Underwater Systems Development Department examined the problem then the Bell System's other organizations began implementation. The company and Navy assets that had installed the first phase of SOSUS, starting in 1951, were engaged in MILS installation and activation.

MILS took several forms, and each had a unique configuration based on purpose and local water column and bottom conditions. The target arrays were bottom-fixed hydrophones connected by cable to the shore stations. A variant, Sonobuoy MILS (SMILS), was composed of bottom mounted hydrophones augmented by air dropped sonobuoys when in use. The third covered wide ocean areas with fixed hydrophones at distant shore sites was termed broad ocean area (BOA) MILS. All systems exploited the SOFAR channel, also known as the deep sound channel, for long range sound propagation in the ocean. (Note: An earlier system for location of downed aircraft had established SOFAR stations to detect and localize the explosion of a Sofar bomb. The Navy's Mark 22/0 SOFAR bomb had about four pounds of explosive, to be detonated by downed air crews. Those were very important in early studies of long range ocean acoustics. The classified Sound Surveillance System applied the effect to long range detection of submarine and surface targets.)

== Target arrays ==
The target arrays received the acoustic effect of an object's impact with the ocean surface then by the effect of an explosive charge with location calculated by the difference in arrival times at the hydrophones arranged to form a rough pentagon with a sixth hydrophone at the center. A particular advantage of the pentagon configuration was that a rapid approximate position could be calculated on simple time sequence of the acoustic wave at the hydrophones, with detailed analysis producing a more exact location. The effectiveness depended on placement of the hydrophone in the deep sound channel. Since the downrange islands did not offer ocean bottom at that depth in the required configuration a system of suspended hydrophones was used. (Note: See referenced page for a diagram.) The difficulty of computing the calibration results for the Atlantic systems led to development of computer programs that became the standard for MILS operational data solutions. The distant placement of the systems revealed the limitations of the existing world geodetic system, with various datum systems based on the local geoid, something that would be solved by satellite systems that would develop the means to tie everything together. Target arrays were high-accuracy systems usually covering a target area of about 10 nmi (12 mi; 19 km) radius.

The Atlantic MILS target arrays were located down range from Cape Canaveral about 700 nmi (810 mi; 1,300 km) at Grand Turk Island, 1,300 nmi (1,500 mi; 2,400 km) at Antigua and 4,400 nmi (5,100 mi; 8,100 km) at Ascension Island.

The Pacific Missile Range (PMR), then Navy-managed as a complex of ranges, was one of the three national missile ranges. PMR began installation of a Pacific MILS to support Intermediate Range Ballistic Missile (IRBM) tests with impact areas northeast of Hawaii. That system terminated at the Marine Corps Air Station Kaneohe Bay. The IRBM array was operational November 1958. Tests of the Intercontinental Ballistic Missile (ICBM) required MILS monitoring impacts between Midway Island and Wake Island and between Wake Island and Eniwetok. The ICBM range was operational in May 1959 with two target arrays. One was located about 70 nmi (81 mi; 130 km) northeast of Wake and another in the corridor between Wake and Eniwetok. Shore facilities were at Kaneohe and each of the islands.

== Broad ocean area (BOA MILS) ==
Ascension MILS BOA hydrophones.

This system has less accuracy but extensive coverage area including whole ocean basins. It would cover test vehicles not making the target or other events not directly related to the accuracy tests. Accuracy was improved by pre test calibration by a ship precisely located by a fixed transponder field releasing SOFAR bombs. The BOA hydrophones were located near the deep sound channel axis and were located at Cape Hatteras, Bermuda, Eleuthera (Bahamas), Grand Turk, Puerto Rico, Antigua, Barbados and Ascension. (Note: The locations correlate to early SOFAR stations, many later engaged in research, and SOSUS shore sites (sometimes also located near earlier SOFAR station/research sites).) In the Pacific a BOA system was installed to cover the Wake—Eniwetok—Midway impact area.

=== Experimental and other uses ===
The BOA MILS sites were involved in events beyond missile testing. Those included both intentional experiments and acoustic incidents in which they were tasked after the fact to examine records. In some experiments MILS was a major participant while in others participation was mainly monitoring and contributing data.

An example of that monitoring role is the nuclear shot "Sword Fish" in Operation Dominic in which both MILS and SOSUS operated normally simply making recordings and strip charts for a period before the detonation until several hours after. Data has also been provided to support research and support for the International Monitoring System monitoring for nuclear weapons tests. That effort also monitors earthquakes.

==== Acoustic propagation research ====
PARKA I track: Sound channel axis and bottom at critical depth with ocean bottom profile between Kaneohe and Alaska.

The Kaneohe BOA array, then part of the Pacific Missile Range, was used in the Long Range Acoustic Propagation Project (LRAPP) series of experiments designated Pacific Acoustics Research Kaneohe—Alaska (PARKA). The experiment was required to develop improved models for predicting performance of antisubmarine detection systems and explain the long detection ranges of two to three thousand miles being observed by SOSUS.

The Kaneohe shore facility was the operational control center for PARKA I with a hydrophone, bottom sited at 2,070 ft (630.9 m), serving as the secondary receiving site. The main receiving site was the research platform FLIP with hydrophones suspended at 300 ft (91.4 m), 2,500 ft (762.0 m) and 10,800 ft (3,291.8 m). The MILS hydrophones at Midway and the SOSUS array at Point Sur were also used in the experiment.

A suspended array designated Sea Spider was to be a part of the PARKA I experiment. The intention was to place an ultra stable three point mooring 350 nmi (400 mi; 650 km) north of Hawaii in 19,000 ft (5,791.2 m) deep water with a strong current. A subsurface buoy would contain three 25-watt thermoelectric isotope generators and communications. The legs were 2/3-inch coaxial cables buoyed with 3400 glass buoyancy floats along which acoustic devices and ocean sensors would be spaced. The installation was pushing existing technology and additional late stage requirements combined to be given as causes for a failure to implant the array. (Note: Erroneous reports of a Sea Spider "system" associated with surveillance likely originate with unclassified mentions of this array.)

==== Heard Island Feasibility Test ====
Bathymetry profile with SOFAR channel axis depth, Heard Island to Ascension Island.

The Ascension BOA site had twelve hydrophones in six pairs cabled to the island. All but two pairs were suspended near the deep sound channel. After amplification the signals were fed into a signal processing system.

Ascension was one of the observing sites for the Heard Island Feasibility Test conducted to observe both the strength and quality of signals traveling at inter-ocean distances and whether those signals were capable of being used in ocean acoustic tomography. A source ship, Cory Chouest, near Heard Island in the Indian Ocean generated signals that were received at Ascension at some 9,200 km (5,700 mi; 5,000 nmi) distance after passing around Africa. Those signals were received as far away as receiving sites and ships on the east and west coasts of North America.

==== Vela incident ====
The Ascension array was one of the systems involved in the Vela incident acoustic signal. Three hydrophones correlated acoustic arrivals with the time and estimated location of the double flash detected by the Vela satellite. The detailed study of the Naval Research Laboratory that was based on models from French nuclear testing in the Pacific concluded the acoustic detection was of a near surface nuclear explosion in the vicinity of the Prince Edward Islands.

== Sonobuoy MILS (SMILS) ==
SMILS was exclusively used to support the Navy's fleet ballistic missile programs under the Strategic Systems Project Office with much of the information classified. The range supported the fixed transponder arrays of ten transponders each on a reimbursable basis. The Atlantic range had seven transponder arrays located from 550 nmi (630 mi; 1,020 km) to 4,700 nmi (5,400 mi; 8,700 km) down range.

The sonobuoy type impact area used a sonobuoy field, typically four rings 3 nmi (3.5 mi; 5.6 km) apart with outside diameter of 20 nmi (23 mi; 37 km), sowed by aircraft and the reference transponder field for geodetic position. SMILS was not dependent on an island downrange and intended for use in remote ocean areas. The transponders were fixed with the sonobuoy field deployed as needed. The specially equipped aircraft did immediate processing with detailed analysis performed later ashore. A special sonobuoy interrogated the transponder field for position of the sonobuoy pattern to the geodetic referenced transponders and another special sonobuoy established the relative of the sonobuoys within the pattern. Before the sonobuoy deployment a special buoy gathered the data to determine actual sound velocity at various depths at deployment time. Data could be collected by specially modified Navy P-3 aircraft or an Advanced Range Instrumentation Aircraft. The P-3 aircraft, flown from Naval Air Station Patuxent River by Air Test and Evaluation Squadron One, were modified to receive and record more sonobuoys, a special timing system and a monitoring and quick look capability. The sonobuoys were modified standard types, in particular with additional battery life and frequencies.

== Bibliography ==
- Baker, H. H. (June 1961). "Missile Impact Locating System" (PDF). Bell Laboratories Record. Vol. 39, no. 6.
- Bell Telephone System (July 1961). "How the ocean grew "ears" to pinpoint missile shots (advertisement)". Air Force and Space Digest. Vol. 44, no. 7.
- Cone, Bruce E. (1 July 1976). The United States Air Force Eastern Test Range — Range Instrumentation Handbook (PDF). Patrick Air Force Base, Florida: Eastern Test Range, Directorate of Range Operations. Archived (PDF) from the original on 27 February 2021.
- De Geer, Lars-Erik; Wright, Christopher (22 September 2019). "From Sheep to Sound Waves, the Data Confirms a Nuclear Test". Foreign Policy. Washington, DC: FP Group, Graham Holdings Company.
- Hanson, J. A.; Given, H. K. (May 1998). Performance of an Island Seismic Station for Recording T-Phases (Report). Lawrence Livermore National Laboratory.
- ICAA (2010). "Integrated Undersea Surveillance System (IUSS) History 1950 - 2010". IUSS/CAESAR Alumni Association.
- Maury Center for Ocean Science (November 1969). Long Range Acoustic Propagation Project — The PARKA I Experiment (PDF) (Report). Washington, D.C.: Department of the Navy, Maury Center for Ocean Science. CiteSeerX 10.1.1.737.5743.
- McIntyre, John W. (1991). "The Advanced Range Instrumentation Aircraft/Sonobuoy Missile Impact Locating System" (PDF). Johns Hopkins APL Technical Digest. 12 (4).
- Munk, Walter H.; Spindel, Robert C.; Baggeroer, Arthur; Birdsall, Theodore G. (20 May 1994). "The Heard Island Feasibility Test" (PDF). Journal of the Acoustical Society of America. 96 (4). Acoustical Society of America: 2330–2342. Bibcode:1994ASAJ...96.2330M. doi:10.1121/1.410105.
- Navy Electronics Laboratory (1985). Operation Dominic, Shot Sword Fish (Extracted, declassified 1985 from project officer's reports of 1962 tests) (PDF) (Report). San Diego, CA: Navy Electronics Laboratory. Archived (PDF) from the original on 10 July 2020.
- NOAA AOML (February 1993). "Reception At Ascension Island, South Atlantic, of the Transmissions From The Heard Island Feasibility Test (NOAA Technical Memorandum ERL AOML-73)" (PDF). National Oceanic and Atmospheric Administration, Atlantic Oceanographic and Meteorological Laboratory (FTP). Miami, Florida. (To view documents see Help:FTP)
- Solomon, Louis P. (April 2011). "Memoir of the Long Range Acoustic Propagation Project (LRAPP)" (PDF). U.S. Navy Journal of Underwater Acoustics. 61 (2). Washington, D.C.: Naval Research Laboratory. Archived (PDF) from the original on 5 August 2021.
- Subcommittee on Military Construction (March–April) (29 April 1959). Military Construction Appropriations for 1960: Hearings.
- Subcommittee on Military Construction (May) (20 May 1959). Military Construction Appropriations for 1960: Hearings.
