= Vema =

Vema may refer to:

- Prolaya Vema Reddy, the first king of the Reddy dynasty in Andhra Pradesh, India
- A Greek pace (unit of length)
- Research Vessel Vema, a research ship of the Lamont–Doherty Earth Observatory and some ocean phenomena discovered using it:
  - Vema (mollusc), a genus of monoplacophoran molluscs
  - The Vema Seamount, a seamount in the South Atlantic Ocean at 31°38' S 8°20' E.
  - The Vema hotspot, a geological hotspot
  - The Vema fracture zone, a fracture zone in the equatorial Atlantic Ocean

== See also ==
- To Vima, Greek daily newspaper
