= Charles L. Drake =

American academic

Charles Lum Drake (July 13, 1924 – July 8, 1997) was an American geologist who was Professor of Geology at Dartmouth College, New Hampshire.

== Biography ==
He was born in Ridgewood, New Jersey, the son of Ervin Thayer Drake and his wife Elizabeth Lum. He graduated from Chatham High School in 1941. Drake enlisted in the U.S. Army during World War II and served in the South Pacific. At the end of the war he enrolled at Princeton University and in 1948 was awarded a Bachelor of Science degree in Engineering. After a few years in the U.S. Navy making gravity measurements in submarines he joined the Lamont-Doherty Geological Observatory of Columbia University, where he was awarded a Ph.D in geophysics in 1958.

He remained at Lamont-Doherty as a member of the faculty until 1969, when he moved to Dartmouth College in New Hampshire, remaining there until his retirement in 1992. He was chair of the department in 1978–79 and associate dean of the science faculty from 1979 to 1985.

He was a leading expert on the geology of continental margins which he studied by geophysical techniques and the results of ocean drilling programs. He pioneered the use of seismic reflection study of the ocean sediments and with Jack Nafe established a relationship between the density of the deposits and the speed at which seismic waves traveled through them known as the Nafe-Drake curve. He particularly studied the Red Sea and the Atlantic Ocean, contributing to the development of the Continental Drift theory.

With his Dartmouth colleague Charles B. Officer, Drake fueled a long-running debate when he suggested that the dinosaurs were killed off by volcanic eruptions rather than by a meteorite.

He was very active in public committee work. From 1990 to 1992 he served as a member of President George H.W.Bush's Council of Advisers on Science and Technology. He sat on numerous committees of the National Academy of Sciences and the National Science Foundation.

== Honors and awards ==
- 1977: President of the Geological Society of America
- 1984–86: President of the American Geophysical Union
- 1989: President of the International Geological Congress
- G.P. Woollard Award of the Geological Society of America

== Private life ==
He married Martha Ann Churchill in 1950 and had four daughters Mary Aiken Drake, Caroline Elizabeth Drake, Sara Ruth Drake, Susannah Churchill Drake. He died in 1997 and is buried in Union Village Vermont.
