= Heard Island feasibility test =

1991 oceanic experiment using low-frequency acoustics

Heard Island Feasibility Test
- The MV Cory Chouest, the vessel fitted with the low-frequency transmitters used in the test

Information
- Country: United States
- Test site: Heard Island, Australia
- Date: January 1991 (35 years ago)
- Number of tests: 35

The Heard Island feasibility test was an experiment conducted by the United States Navy to determine if man-made acoustic signals could be transmitted over antipodal distances to measure the ocean's climate. The experiment was the brainchild of Walter Munk, who hypothesized that due to the ocean's absorption of the majority of the heat in Earth's atmosphere, change in the temperature of the ocean would be the most reliable metric to determine if the Earth was heating.

== Background ==
Munk had a history of collaboration with the US Navy. He spent World War II using analog methods to track waves and aid in weather predictions before Allied amphibious landings, notably forecasting a break in an Atlantic storm that allowed Allied forces to land at Normandy on D day in 1944. After the war, Munk remained a contractor of the Navy and continued to conduct research on its behalf throughout the Cold War, developing a method for using low-frequency sound waves to map the ocean floor called ocean acoustic tomography.

After being asked by the US Department of Energy to forecast the effects of carbon dioxide production on the warming of the Earth, Munk faced the challenge of measuring the Earth's temperature scientifically. Although he concluded that measuring the ocean's temperature would be an excellent starting point, he still faced the issue of myriad variations across the oceans, such as differences in salinity, seasons, weather phenomena, and geography, which would make ascertaining one overall measurement very difficult. To remedy this he devised a system in which low-frequency, acoustic signals would be transmitted and recorded across vast oceanic distances. Because the speed of sound in saltwater varies based on the temperature of the water, the time it took for a transmission to reach a receiver could be converted into an ocean-wide temperature measurement.

== Preparation ==
Heard Island was quickly selected as the location to transmit the signals from, as it lay nearly equidistant from the East and West Coasts of the United States and would allow the acoustic signals to reach every major ocean basin in the world. The island is additionally a territory of Australia, and the US–Australian military relationship remained strong long after the signing of the ANZUS treaty in 1951. With the cooperation of the US Navy, the experiment team procured the vessel MV Cory Chouest, chosen for its array of acoustic transmitters capable of very powerful transmission at very low frequency and its moon pool from which the transmitter could be lowered. Existing SOSUS infrastructure was planned to be used for receiving the transmissions and as the notoriety of the experiment grew, scientists in various other countries offered to operate receivers as well.

== Controversy ==
Before the experiment could proceed the Navy required approval from the National Marine Fisheries Service, whose oversight of certain Navy activities with potential to affect sea life was mandated by the Marine Mammal Protection Act. With only a few weeks until the planned execution of the test, the Marine Mammal Commission contacted NOAA to express concern over the potential sea life impacts of transmitting high-energy, low-frequency acoustics in the Heard Island area. The Marine Mammal Commission expressed particular concern with respect to whales, who use low-frequency sounds to communicate, navigate, and hunt. With little time to conduct a full evaluation, NOAA, which was a lead sponsor of the experiment, mandated that a marine mammal survey take place in preparation for and during the test, as well as marine mammal experts being present during the test. Accordingly, the Navy procured the Cory Chouest's sister ship, Amy Chouest to conduct the survey and house marine mammal experts.

== Experiment ==
With both ships on station and permits issued, the test was scheduled to begin January 26, 1991. The night of January 25th, during what were supposed to be the final low energy tests of the transmission equipment aboard Cory Chouest, transmissions were received at listening stations in Bermuda off the US Eastern Seaboard and in Washington State, on the West Coast of the United States. With the reception of signals on opposite sides of the United States the main question of the experiment was answered, albeit before the experiment had even begun.

On January 26th the experiment formally began though it was not run for the planned ten days due to a combination of unfavorable weather and above-normal stress on the transmission equipment operating at such low frequencies. By January 30th, all but three transmitters had been decommissioned, and the final transmission was made the next day.

== Aftermath ==
Although a success—man-made sound was transmitted and received across antipodal distances—the test failed to reveal much information about the temperature and warming or cooling trends of the ocean. The 1996–2006 Acoustic Thermometry of Ocean Climate (ATOC) project in the Pacific Ocean sought to conduct a similar experiment over a much longer term and on an ocean basin scale.

The experiment resulted in no known instances of marine mammal distress.

== See also ==
- Whale biosonar
- Marine Mammal Protection Act
