= Sofar =

Sofar may refer to:

- Sofar bomb (SOund Fixing And Ranging bomb), a long-range position-fixing system that uses explosive sounds in the deep sound channel of the ocean
- SOFAR channel (SOund Fixing And Ranging channel), a horizontal layer of water in the ocean centered on the depth at which the speed of sound is minimum
- Sofar Sounds, music events company

== See also ==
- Shofar, a musical instrument
- Sawfar, a village in Lebanon
