= LDEO =

LDEO may refer to:

- Lamont–Doherty Earth Observatory, at Columbia University in New York, U.S.
- Lunar distance Earth orbit
