= J. Lamar Worzel =

American geophysicist and underwater photographer

Joe Worzel

J. Lamar Worzel (February 21, 1919 – December 26, 2008) was an American geophysicist known for his important contributions to underwater acoustics, underwater photography, and gravity measurements at sea.

== Life ==
Worzel was born on February 21, 1919, in Staten Island, New York. His father was a real-estate lawyer.

Worzel, was a graduate of Lehigh University. There he met Dr. Maurice Ewing with whom he had a forty-year working relationship. He had a long and notable career as a research scientist and professor of oceanography at Woods Hole Oceanographic Institution before following Ewing to the new Lamont Geological Observatory at Columbia University. He conducted annual research on many ships, including the Vema, which set the stage for the rapid advances in marine geology and geophysics in the late 1940s and 1950s. Along with Ewing and Alan Vine, he built the first camera designed to go to a depth of 3000 fathoms (5.5 km), in 1939.

Together with Ewing, he discovered "shadow zones" in the oceans that were not accessible to sonar detection as well as "deep sound channels" that transmit low frequency sounds for long distances. Such discoveries were of military significance and the basis for the development of the Sofar channel program of the US Navy. Other achievements included the precise measurement of the earth's gravity field from surface ships, previously hampered by the inherent instability of ship platforms.

In 1963 he led a team conducting an acoustic investigation which later found the remains of the nuclear powered submarine USS Thresher (SSN 593), lost after deep diving trials.

He was a Gravity Specialist and Co-Chief Scientist and eventually Associate Director at Lamont Geological Observatory (now known as Lamont–Doherty Earth Observatory), director of the Marine Science Institute Geophysical Laboratory at Galveston, Texas, from 1975–79, vice-president of Society of Exploration Geophysicists (1978–79), and principal investigator of the drilling program on the Blake plateau region off Jacksonville, Florida, in 1965. Worzel is a cofounder of the Palisades Geophysical Institute and served as its president from 1974 until 2002 when he disbanded it as he felt the research was too focused on weaponry. Worzel was a fellow of the American Geophysical Union.

His work had both military and peaceful implications. With Ewing he established that the sea floor is not a former sunken continent but an original ocean basin. Today, the J. Lamar Worzel Assistant Scientist Fund is a US$1 million fund that supports young scientists pursuing careers in geophysical oceanography at Woods Hole. Additionally, the Maurice Ewing and J. Lamar Worzel Professorship of Geophysics at Columbia University in New York is named in his honor.

He was married to the former Dorothy Crary.

== Publications ==
- Propagation of Sound in the Ocean. [Three papers.] with Maurice Ewing & Chaim L. Pekeris
- Gravity and Geodesy: 1. Gravity Investigations of the Subduction Zone
- Pendulum Gravity Measurements at Sea
- Tertiary Tectonics of Central Hispaniola and the Adjacent Caribbean Sea with John W. Ladd
- New Concepts of Sea Floor Evolution Part 1 and 2 with Edward Bullard
