= Sound speed profile =

A sound speed profile shows the speed of sound in water at different vertical levels. It has two general representations:

1. tabular form, with pairs of columns corresponding to ocean depth and the speed of sound at that depth, respectively.
2. a plot of the speed of sound in the ocean as a function of depth, where the vertical axis corresponds to the depth and the horizontal axis corresponds to the sound speed. By convention, the horizontal axis is placed at the top of the plot, and the vertical axis is labeled with values that increase from top to bottom, thus reproducing visually the ocean from its surface downward.

Table 1 shows an example of the first representation; figure 1 shows the same information using the second representation.

Table 1. A sound speed profile in tabular form.
Depth (m)	Sound speed (m/s)	Depth (m)	Sound speed (m/s)
0	1540.4	500	1517.2
10	1540.5	600	1518.2
20	1540.7	700	1519.5
30	1534.4	800	1521.0
50	1523.3	900	1522.6
75	1519.6	1000	1524.1
100	1518.5	1100	1525.7
125	1517.9	1200	1527.3
150	1517.3	1300	1529.0
200	1516.6	1400	1530.7
250	1516.5	1500	1532.4
300	1516.2	1750	1536.7
400	1516.4	2000	1541.0

Figure 1. Table 1's data in graphical format.

Although given as a function of depth (Note: Technically, depth isn't the physical variable which influences the sound speed. Rather, it is pressure. However, given the near linear relationship between the two, depth is used more often when presenting sound speed profiles.), the speed of sound in the ocean does not depend solely on depth. Rather, for a given depth, the speed of sound depends on the temperature at that depth, the depth itself, and the salinity at that depth, in that order.

The speed of sound in the ocean at different depths can be measured directly, e.g., by using a velocimeter, or, using measurements of temperature and salinity at different depths, it can be calculated using a number of different sound speed formulae which have been developed. Examples of such formulae include those by Wilson, Chen and Millero, and Mackenzie. Each such formulation applies within specific limits of the independent variables. There are software solutions that ease the adoption of such formulas, e.g., the open-source Sound Speed Manager.

From the shape of the sound speed profile in figure 1, one can see the effect of the order of importance of temperature and depth on sound speed. Near the surface, where temperatures are generally highest, the sound speed is often highest because the effect of temperature on sound speed dominates. Further down the water column, sound speed also decreases as temperature decreases in the ocean thermocline, and sound speed also decreases. At a certain point, however, the effect of depth, i.e., pressure, begins to dominate, and the sound speed increases to the ocean floor. Also visible in figure 1 is a common feature in sound speed profiles: the SOFAR channel. The axis of this channel is found at the depth of minimum sound speed. Sounds emitted at or near the axis of this channel propagate for very long horizontal distances, owing to the refraction of the sound back to the channel's center.

Sound speed profile data are necessary for underwater acoustic propagation models, especially those based on ray tracing theory.
