= A. Park Williams =

Academic background
- Education: University of California, Irvine (BS); University of California, Santa Barbara (MA) (PhD)
- Thesis: Tree Rings, Climate Variability, and Coastal Summer Stratus Clouds in the Western United States. (2009)

Academic work
- Discipline: Oceanography, climate science
- Sub-discipline: Hydroclimatology
- Institutions: University of California, Santa Barbara; Los Alamos National Laboratory; Lamont-Doherty Earth Observatory; University of California, Los Angeles

A. Park Williams (born 1980 or 1981) is a hydroclimatologist and associate professor in the Department of Geography at the University of California, Los Angeles. His research focuses on how terrestrial water systems are affected by the climate, with an emphasis on wildfires and drought. In October 2023, he was named a MacArthur Fellow.

== Biography ==
In 2003, Williams graduated from the University of California, Irvine with a B.S. in Earth Systems Science. He received his M.A. and PhD from the University of California, Santa Barbara, in 2003 and 2009, respectively. He continued at UCSB as a post-doctoral researcher until 2011, when he joined the Los Alamos National Laboratory. He became a research professor at the Lamont-Doherty Earth Observatory of Columbia University in 2013, where he remained until 2021. He is currently an associate professor in the Department of Geography at the University of California, Los Angeles.

== Selected Publications ==
- Park Williams, A., Allen, C., Macalady, A. et al., Temperature as a potent driver of regional forest drought stress and tree mortality. Nature Climate Change, 3, 292–297. (2013). https://doi.org/10.1038/nclimate1693
- W.R.L. Anderegg et al., Pervasive drought legacies in forest ecosystems and their implications for carbon cycle models. Science, 349, 528-532 (2015). https://doi.org/10.1126/science.aab1833
- Park Williams, A., Abatzoglou, J., Gershunov, A., et al., Observed impacts of anthropogenic climate change on wildfire in California. Earth's Future, 7(8), 892-910 (2019). https://doi.org/10.1029/2019EF001210
- Williams, A.P., et al., Large contribution from anthropogenic warming to an emerging North American megadrought. Science 368, 314-318 (2020). https://doi.org/10.1126/science.aaz9600
- Williams, A.P., Cook, B.I. & Smerdon, J.E. Rapid intensification of the emerging southwestern North American megadrought in 2020–2021. Nature Climate Change, 12, 232–234 (2022). https://doi.org/10.1038/s41558-022-01290-z
