= Vema Seamount =

Atlantic seamount west of Cape Town, South Africa

- Bathymetric map
- Summit depth: 26 metres (14 fathoms)
- Summit area: 13 square kilometres (5 mi^{2})

Location
- Coordinates: 31°38′S 8°20′E

Geology
- Type: Guyot
- Age of rock: 11.00 ± 0.3 million years old

History
- Discovery date: 1959
- Discovered by: RV Vema

Vema Seamount is a seamount in the South Atlantic Ocean. Discovered in 1959 by a ship with the same name, it lies 1,600 kilometres (1,000 mi) from Tristan da Cunha and 1,000 kilometres (620 mi) northwest of Cape Town. The seamount has a flat top at a mean depth of 73 metres (40 fathoms) which was eroded into the seamount at a time when sea levels were lower; the shallowest point lies at 26 metres (14 fathoms) depth. The seamount was formed between 15 and 11 million years ago, possibly by a hotspot.

The seamount rises high enough that its summit is at shallow depth, allowing sunlight to reach it and thus permitting the growth of kelp and algae. A number of sea animals and fish are encountered on the seamount; active fisheries existed at Vema Seamount and caused the disappearance of some animal species.

== History ==
Vema Seamount was discovered by the research ship RV Vema of the Lamont–Doherty Earth Observatory in 1959. Vema was one of the first seamounts to be the subject of scientific study, and the first seamount investigated by scuba divers without special equipment. It lies in international waters and its summit is so shallow that it is a navigation hazard to ships.

== Geomorphology and geography ==
Vema Seamount lies in the South Atlantic Ocean, 1,600 kilometres (1,000 mi) from Tristan da Cunha. The cities of Cape Town and Lüderitz lie east-southeast and northeast of Vema, respectively; the distance from Cape Town is about 1,000 kilometres (620 mi). An unrelated seamount with the same name lies in the North Atlantic, close to the Mid-Atlantic Ridge.

The seamount has a conical shape with a flat top; the shallowest point rises to an elevation of 26 metres (14 fathoms) below sea level – later determined to be 21.5 metres (71 ft) deep – and is called Collins Point. At least one source gives a minimum depth of 11 metres (36 ft) for the seamount, while bathymetric surveys in 2015 have found a minimum depth of 21.5 metres (71 ft). The flat top is a summit plateau with a width of 8.0 kilometres (5 mi) and according to a 2019 publication 11 by 8.5 kilometres (6.8 mi × 5.3 mi) at a mean depth of 73 metres (40 fathoms) and has been named Emerson Plateau; it has a vaguely triangular shape pointing west, and Collins Point lies close to the western margin of the Emerson Plateau. Other points on the Plateau also rise to depths of less than 55 metres (30 fathoms). The summit plateau mostly consists of hard rock, like the upper slopes, with rocky outcrops separated by sandy plains. The plateau appears to be a wave-cut platform of Pleistocene age, when sea levels were lower, and is swept by strong ocean currents.

The seamount rises from a depth of 4,600 metres (2,500 fathoms), where it occupies a breadth of 56 kilometres (35 mi) and forms an isolated conical feature. The seafloor from which Vema rises is part of the abyssal plain of the Cape Basin. From there, the slopes of Vema first rise steeply and feature subsidiary summits; above 130 metres (70 fathoms) depth, the slopes flatten.

== Geology ==
Volcanic rocks such as tuff as well as calcareous aggregates are found on the plateau. Collins Point is composed of phonolite, which contains aegirine, alkali feldspar, augite, and nepheline. Olivine-containing basalt has also been found. A minimum age of 11.0 ± 0.3 million years has been obtained from samples taken at Collins Point by potassium-argon dating, with another age estimate being 15 million years. Older ages have been obtained deeper on the seamount; a sample from 3,000 metres (9,800 ft) depth gave an age of 18 million years. Light-coloured rocks on the summit platform may constitute a former carbonate platform.

Vema is an intraplate volcano. It is considered to be the present-day location of a hotspot, the Vema hotspot, although the hotspot itself may have moved farther south or west (by about 200 kilometres (120 mi)) since it created the Vema Seamount and may not be active anymore. Earlier volcanism (Note: Including the Gibeon kimberlites and carbonatites (79–72 million years old), the 77 ± 2 million years old Gross Brukkaros, the 49 ± 1 million years old Dicker Willem carbonatites (and associated Tsirub nephelinites), the 46 million years old Klinghardt phonolites, the 37 million years old Swartkop phonolite and the 36 million years old Schwarzeberg nephelinite. Other potential correlates are the melilites close to the mouth of the Orange River, which are 37 million years old, or even the Karoo-Ferrar large igneous province.) caused by the Vema hotspot may have manifested itself in southern Namibia in the form of alkaline volcanics that define a HIMU (Note: HIMU is a suite of mantle melts with high uranium-non-wiktionary:radiogenic lead ratios and a high ratio of radiogenic to non-radiogenic lead.) suite.

Seismic tomography has shown what may be a mantle plume underneath Vema, while another theory considers the Vema hotspot is a consequence of the Tristan hotspot shedding a secondary diapir. The hotspot origin of the Vema Seamount is not universally agreed upon.

== Water conditions ==
Water temperatures at Vema range between 18–21 °C (64–70 °F), and decrease with increasing depth. The cold Benguela Current does not reach the seamount, which is instead influenced by the South Atlantic oceanic gyre. The movement and strength of ocean eddies are altered when they interact with Vema Seamount, with Agulhas eddies often splitting apart at the seamount. During the ice ages, sea level drop may have exposed part of the summit platform.

== Biology ==
The seamount features both shallow-water and deep-water life. Its summit is shallow enough that sunlight can reach it, resulting in the growth of various types of algae and seaweeds such as Ecklonia kelp. Such kelp covers large parts of the seamount, and a coral framework makes up much of the summit platform.

A number of animals inhabit Vema, usually hidden or encrusting animals. Ascidians, black corals, non-reef-building corals including gorgonia and scleractinia, crayfish such as the rock lobster (Jasus tristani), and other decapods, holothurians, hydroids, polyzoa, sea fans, and sponges live on the seamount. Other animals such as bryozoans, echinoderms, gastropods, oysters, pelecypods, serpulids, and other worms have also left their traces on Vema. Rock lobsters propagate from Gough Island and Tristan da Cunha to Vema Seamount, while other species appear to originate from South Africa.

Several species appear to be endemic to Vema Seamount, including the sea-snail species Austromitra rosenbergi discovered in 2015 and the sponge Strongylodesma areolata described in 1969; it is estimated that about 22–36% of all species at Vema are endemic, similar to the proportion of endemic species at other seamounts of the world. The holothurian Holothuria vemae is named after the seamount, where it was discovered in 1965–1966, as is the sea snail Trivia vemacola. Vema Seamount is the type locality for the deepwater sponge Desmacidon clavata.

A number of fish have been encountered at Vema, although most fish species appear to be pelagic species that are not directly bound to the seamount environment. Fishing operations have attracted seabirds to Vema Seamount. Humpback whales have been detected through their sounds, and baleen whales feed at Vema. Euphausiids and copepods are also found in the waters, including at least one copepod that parasitizes fish. Among the fish species encountered at Vema Seamount are:

- Acantholatris monodactylus (St. Paul's fingerfin)
- Decapterus longimanus
- Decapterus macarellus (Mackerel scad)
- Emmelichthys nitidus
- Kentrocapros rosapinto (an Indopacific species)
- Meganthias sp.
- Nelabrichthys ornatus
- Polyprion americanus (Atlantic wreckfish)
- Pristipomoides sieboldii
- Schedophilus ovalis (Imperial blackfish)
- Seriola lalandi (Yellowtail amberjack)
- Sphoeroides pachygaster (Blunthead puffer)
- Thunnus albacares (Yellowfin tuna)
- Thunnus obesus (Bigeye tuna)
- Wreckfish
- Yellowtail

Fish on the seamount were commercially fished. (Note: In the late 1970s, Mackerel scad fishing commenced at Vema, followed in the 1980s by tuna.) Rock lobsters in particular were heavily exploited; they disappeared from Vema Seamount after overfishing in the 1960s, briefly recovered, and then disappeared again by 1981 due to renewed overfishing. The collapse of this fishery is one of the first instances of a seamount fishery collapsing, and has been cited as an example of how fisheries outside of exclusive economic zones end up ungoverned and abused. Vema Seamount was closed to fishery in 2007 by the South East Atlantic Fisheries Organisation, and man-made debris such as crab traps and ropes can be found there. The ecosystem is classified as "threatened" by the Food and Agriculture Organization.
