= G. Michael Purdy =

British geophysicist and oceanographer

Graham Michael "Mike" Purdy is a British geophysicist and oceanographer who specializes in marine seismology. He retired as the Executive Vice President for Research at Columbia University on 1 January 2020. Previously, he was the Director of Columbia's Lamont–Doherty Earth Observatory (LDEO). Currently, he is a Professor Emeritus of Earth and Environmental Sciences.

== Education ==
Purdy received a B.S. with honors in 1969 and an M.S. in 1970 from Imperial College of the University of London, then received a PhD in marine geophysics from the University of Cambridge in 1974.

== Woods Hole Oceanographic Institution ==
After leaving Cambridge, Purdy joined WHOI in 1974 as a Post Doctoral Scholar. In 1991, he became Chairman of the Department of Geology and Geophysics (G&G), a position he held until leaving WHOI in 1995 for the NSF.

== National Science Foundation ==
From 1995 to 2000, Purdy served as the Director of the Division of Ocean Sciences in the Geosciences Directorate of the NSF. He oversaw a breadth of research activities, including the international Ocean Drilling Program and the foundation-wide Life in Extreme Environments (LExEn) initiative, which he established in 1997 .

== Lamont–Doherty Earth Observatory ==
At LDEO, Purdy has worked to further the department's role in The Earth Institute at Columbia University, an inter-departmental research institute founded in 1995 to address the complex social, economic, and environmental implications of the earth sciences. LDEO is the largest component of this alliance, and Purdy has taken an interest in interdisciplinary approaches to the traditional earth science work of the department. For example, he began the Director’s Series on the Science of Diversity, bringing researchers in the social sciences to LDEO to speak on issues such as gender differences in scientific research productivity. He has dedicated particular attention to the problem of climate change, particularly as highlighted by the work of fellow LDEO scientist Wally Broecker.

== Awards and honors ==
- Maurice Ewing Medal (American Geophysical Union, U.S. Navy), 2006
