= Dorsa Ewing =

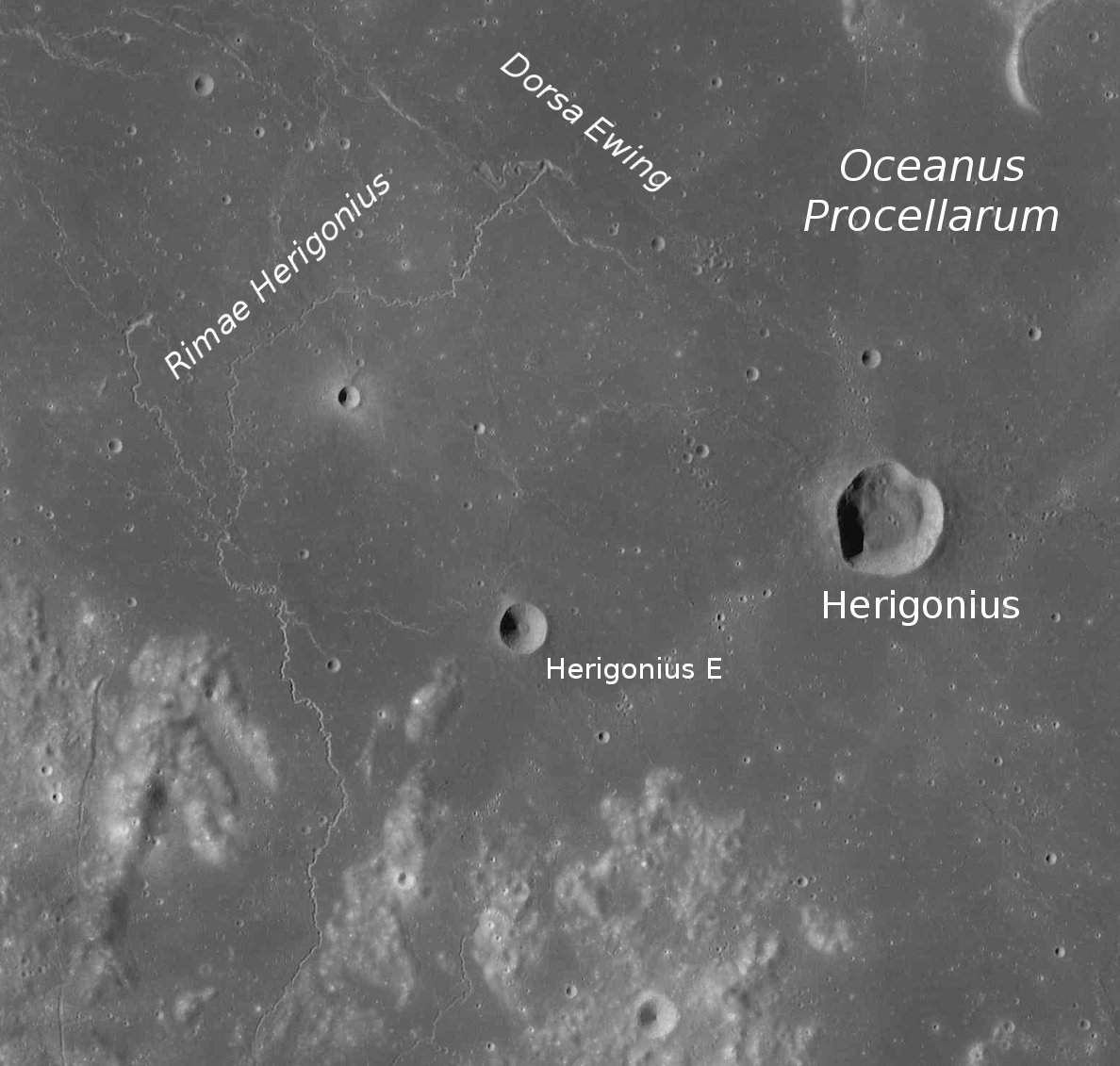
Dorsa Ewing is on the top of the photo

Dorsa Ewing is a wrinkle ridge at 10.2°S 39.4°W in Oceanus Procellarum on the Moon. It is 262 km long and was named after American geophysicist William Maurice Ewing.
