= Maurice Ewing =

American geophysicist and oceanographer (1906–1974)

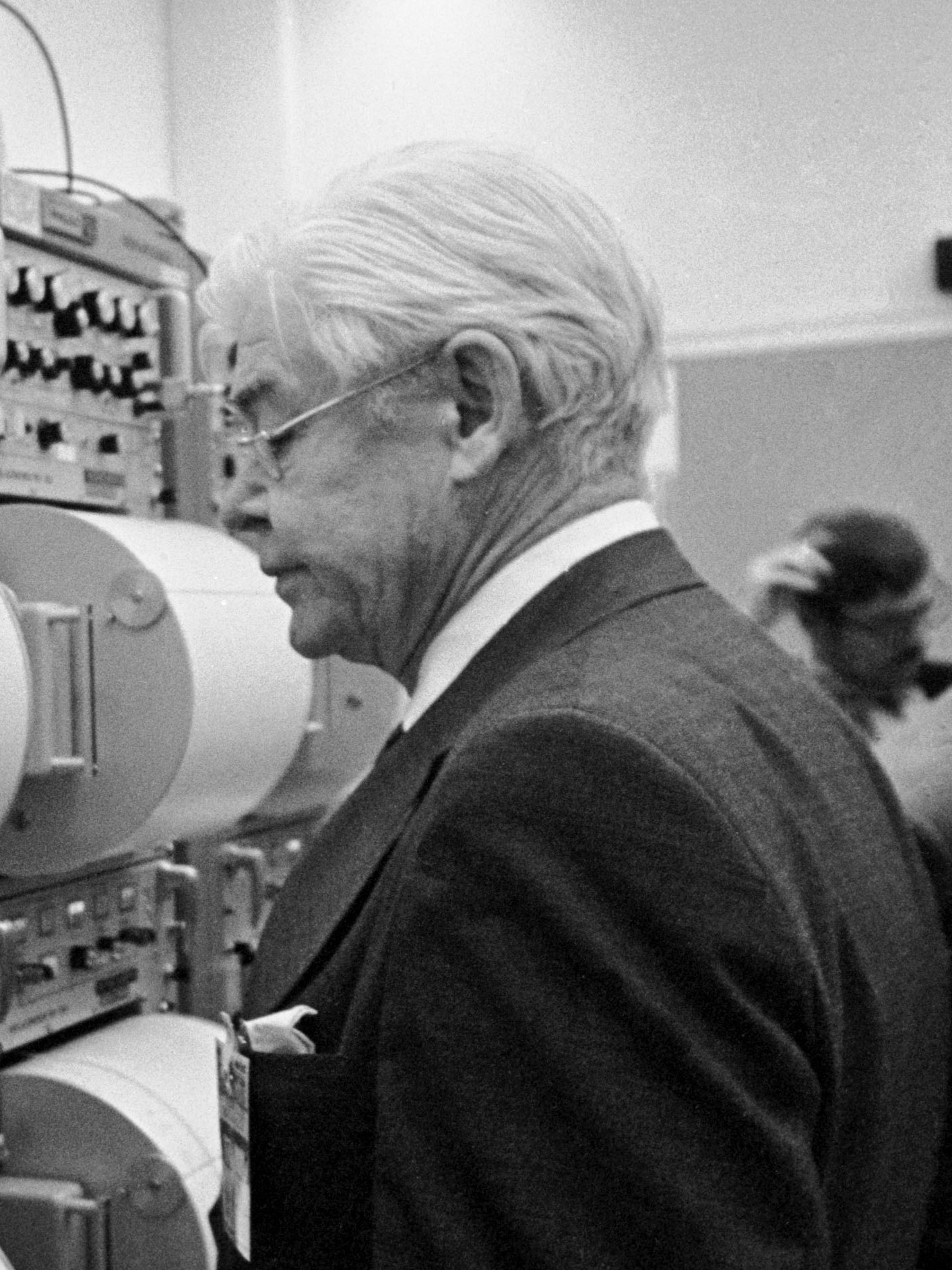
- Ewing in 1972
- Born: William Maurice Ewing; May 12, 1906; Lockney, Texas, US
- Died: May 4, 1974 (aged 67); Galveston, Texas, US
- Education: Rice University
- Awards: Alexander Agassiz Medal (1954); William Bowie Medal (1957); Cullum Geographical Medal (1961); John J. Carty Award (1963); Wollaston Medal (1969); National Medal of Science (1973); Vetlesen Prize (1960); Fellow of the Royal Society (1972); Walter H. Bucher Medal (1974); Penrose Medal (1974)
- Scientific career
- Fields: geophysics underwater acoustics oceanography
- Workplaces: Lehigh University; Columbia University; University of Texas
- Thesis: Calculation of ray paths from seismic travel-time curves (1931)
- Doctoral advisor: Harold A. Wilson

William Maurice "Doc" Ewing (May 12, 1906 – May 4, 1974) was an American geophysicist and oceanographer.

Ewing has been described as a pioneering geophysicist who worked on the research of seismic reflection and refraction in ocean basins, ocean bottom photography, submarine sound transmission (including the SOFAR channel), deep sea core samples of the ocean bottom, theory and observation of earthquake surface waves, fluidity of the Earth's core, generation and propagation of microseisms, submarine explosion seismology, marine gravity surveys, bathymetry and sedimentation, natural radioactivity of ocean waters and sediments, study of abyssal plains and submarine canyons.

== Biography ==
Ewing was born in Lockney, Texas, where he was the eldest surviving child of a large farm family. He won a scholarship to attend Rice University, earning a BA with honors in 1926. He completed his graduate studies at the same institution, earning an MA in 1927 and being awarded his PhD in 1931. In 1928 he was married to Avarilla Hildenbrand, and the couple had a son. The couple divorced in 1941.

Ewing worked as an instructor at the Rice Institute while pursuing his PhD before joining the faculty at Lehigh University in 1930, where he served until 1944. While at Lehigh, he was instrumental in initiating a program in geophysics. In 1944 he married Margaret Sloan Kidder, with whom he had four children.

He moved to Columbia University, becoming a professor of geology in 1947. In 1959 he was named the Higgins Professor of Geology at Columbia. Dr. Ewing (often simply called 'Doc' by those who worked with him) was the founder (established in 1949) and first director of Lamont Geological Observatory (now known as Lamont–Doherty Earth Observatory (LDEO) in Palisades, New York) where he worked with J. Lamar Worzel (gravity specialist), Dr. Frank Press (seismologist), Jack Nafe, Jack Oliver, and geologists and oceanographic cartographers Dr. Bruce Heezen and Marie Tharp.

The former LDEO research vessel R/V Maurice Ewing was named in his honor.

He divorced a second time, and married his third wife Harriet Greene Bassett in 1965. In 1972 he joined the University of Texas Medical Branch at Galveston, and was named the head of the Division of Earth and Planetary Sciences of the Marine Biomedical Institute.

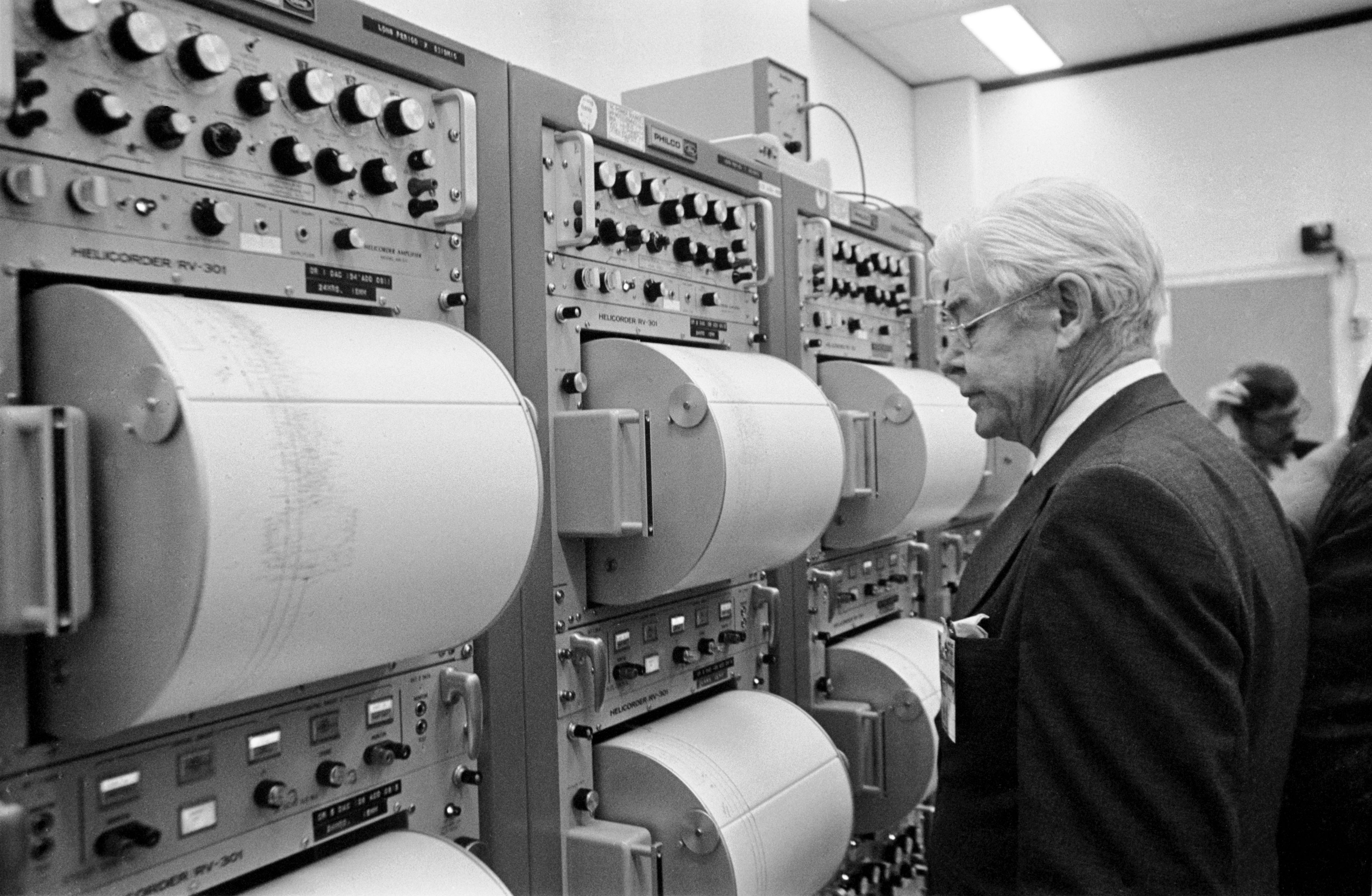
The seismometer readings from the impact made by the Apollo 17 Saturn S-IVB stage when it struck the lunar surface are viewed in the ALSEP room in the Mission Control Center at Houston by Maurice Ewing, 1972

During his career he published over 340 scientific papers. He served as president of the American Geophysical Union and the Seismological Society of America. He led over 50 oceanic expeditions. He made many contributions to oceanography, including the discovery of the SOFAR Channel, the invention of the sofar bomb, and did much fundamental work on plate tectonics. While he was working on SOFAR, Ewing engaged in deep water photography, partly as a hobby and partly to help the government identify lost ships destroyed by U-boats. He was the chief scientist on board the Glomar Challenger. He originated Project Mogul, an early program to detect Soviet nuclear weapons tests.

Ewing suffered a fatal stroke in 1974 in Galveston, Texas.

== Awards and honors ==
- Penrose Medal, 1974 (posthumously)
- Walter H. Bucher Medal, 1974
- William Bowie Medal, 1957
- Arthur L. Day Medal, 1949
- John J. Carty Award of the National Academy of Sciences, 1963
- Navy Distinguished Public Service Award, 1955
- Sidney Powers Memorial Medal, 1968
- Robert Earl McConnell Award, 1973
- National Medal of Science, 1973
- Vega Medal of the Swedish Society for Anthropology and Geography, 1965
- Cullum Geographical Medal of the American Geographical Society, 1961
- Gold Medal of the Royal Astronomical Society, 1964
- Elected to the National Academy of Sciences, 1948
- Elected a Foreign Member of the Royal Netherlands Academy of Arts and Sciences, 1956
- Elected a Foreign Member of the Royal Society (1972)
- Elected a Fellow of the American Association for the Advancement of Science, 1938
- Elected a Fellow of the American Physical Society, 1938
- Elected to the American Academy of Arts and Sciences, 1951
- Elected to the American Philosophical Society, 1959
- Foreign Member of the Geological Society of London, 1964
- Guggenheim Fellow, 1938, 1953, 1955
- Vetlesen Prize, 1960
- Eleven honorary degrees
- Geophysics Laboratory at the University of Texas Medical Branch Marine Science Institute was renamed Maurice Ewing Hall.
- The Maurice Ewing Medals of the Society of Exploration Geophysicists and American Geophysical Union were named after him.
- The lunar wrinkle ridge Dorsa Ewing was named after him.

== See also ==
- List of geophysicists
- Research Vessel Maurice Ewing
