= Vema fracture zone =

Fracture zone in the equatorial Atlantic which offsets the Mid-Atlantic Ridge to the left

Coordinates: 10.726°N 42.333°W

Vema fracture zone, full extent

Vema transform fault

The Vema fracture zone is a fracture zone in the equatorial Atlantic Ocean. It offsets the Mid-Atlantic Ridge by 320 km to the left. Its transform valley has a depth of 5000m. The fracture zone can be traced for over 2500 km east to west.

== Exploration history ==
From temperature data gathered from the deep ocean on the German Meteor expedition (1925–1927) Georg Wüst already suspected that there should be a passage through the Mid-Atlantic Ridge around latitude 9 North. The Vema fracture zone was then discovered in 1956 by G.R. Hamilton on board RV Vema, with additional surveying taking place in the years 1959–1960. In the 1960s research was done by USNS Thomas Washington (T-AGOR-10), RV Atlantis II, RV Chain, RV Argo and USNS Robert D. Conrad (T-AGOR-3). The fault was subsequently explored by the French research vessel Jean Charcot in 1977 using its SeaBeam Classic multibeam echosounder, the French submersible Nautile and its mothership RV Nadir in 1989, the US RV Maurice Ewing in 1993, and the Russian RV Akademik Nikolay Strakhov in 1998, making it one of the world's best surveyed seafloor features.

== Transverse ridge ==
The southern wall of the transform valley is crowned by one of the longest and highest transverse ridges of the entire mid-ocean ridge system. This narrow ridge must have risen as a single vertical slab 6.6 million years ago. Up to three million years ago the ridge was at or even above sealevel. Later it subsided to its present depth of 450 meters.

== Lema fracture zone ==
While the transform valley of the Vema fracture zone has a V-shaped profile, the next fracture zone to the south has a steep vertical wall on its southern side rising from a horizontal valley bottom. As an L would fit in well here, this fracture zone is nicknamed Lema fracture zone. The north–south distance between the Vema and Lema fracture zones is 70 km.

=== Ridge jump ===
Up to 2.2 million years ago the Vema transform fault was 40 km shorter than today, and the Lema fracture zone had a leftward offset of 40 km. Then the old spreading valley between Lema and Vema died, and spreading started from an axis 40 km to the east. The Vema transform was thus extended by 40 km, while the Lema fracture zone was reduced to zero offset. Spreading from the new axis has meanwhile increased the distance between the old and the new axis to 80 km.
