= VX-1 =

Air Test and Evaluation Squadron 1
- VX-1 Insignia
- Active: 1943 - Present
- Country: United States
- Branch: United States Navy
- Type: Special flight test aircraft squadron
- Garrison/HQ: NAS Patuxent River
- Nickname: Pioneers
- Motto: Does it First

VX-1, Air Test and Evaluation Squadron One, (AIRTEVRON ONE) is a United States Navy air test and evaluation squadron based at Naval Air Station Patuxent River, Maryland.

== Operations ==
Operational aircraft are assigned to VX-1 including the P-8A Poseidon, E-2D Advanced Hawkeye, MH-60R and MH-60S. Additionally, VX-1 provides test and evaluation support for aircraft such as the KC-130J Hercules, E-6B Mercury, MQ-8B Fire Scout, and MQ-4C Triton Unmanned Aerial Vehicles.

The squadron operated two specially equipped P-3 aircraft that were equipped to collect data from the large sonobuoy fields used by the Sonobuoy Missile Impact Location System (SMILS) which supported the Navy's fleet ballistic missile program testing. The aircraft modifications enabled the aircraft to receive and record more sonobuoys, had a special timing system and a data monitoring and quick look capability. The Air Force Advanced Range Instrumentation Aircraft could also operate with SMILS.

== Mission statement ==
The principal mission of VX-1 is to test and evaluate airborne anti-submarine warfare (ASW) and maritime anti-surface warfare (SUW) weapon systems, airborne strategic weapon systems, as well as support systems, equipment and materials in an operational environment. The squadron also develops, reviews and disseminates new ASW/SUW tactics and procedures for fleet use.

== History ==
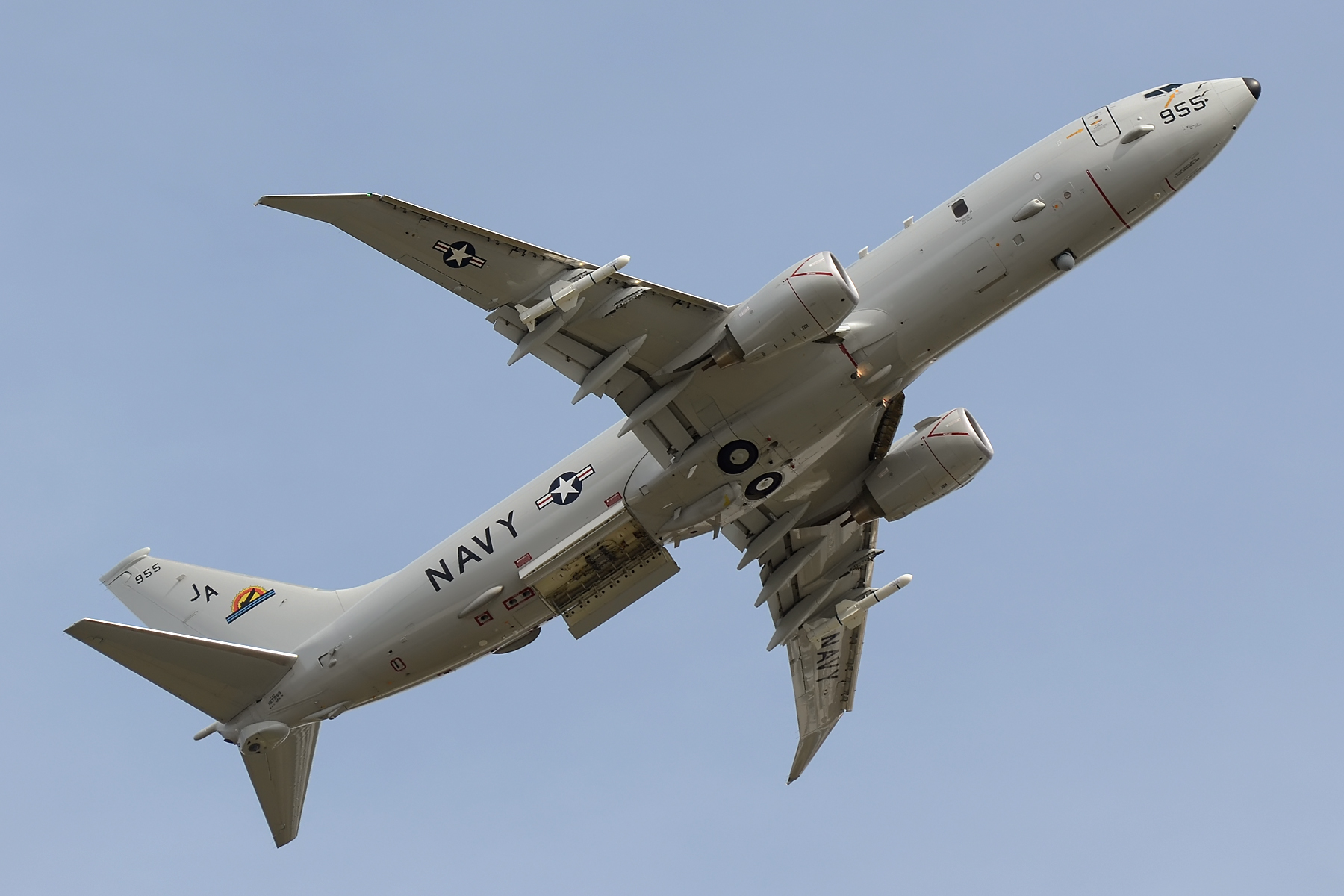
A VX-1 P-8A Poseidon

VX-1 formed during WWII in response to the German submarines threat. The response by the United States was the commissioning of the Air Antisubmarine Commander Air Force, Atlantic Fleet, on 1 April 1943 at Quonset Point, Rhode Island.

The squadron left NAS Key West, Florida on or about 1 July 1973 when the squadron moved to its current home at NAS Patuxent River, Maryland.

== Commanding officer ==
Current Commanding Officer of VX-1 is Captain John Riley, an E-2D Naval Flight Officer and Carrier Airborne Early Warning Weapons School (CAEWWS) graduate.

== See also ==
- History of the United States Navy
- List of United States Navy aircraft squadrons
