= G. Unger Vetlesen =

Norwegian philanthropist

- Born: Georg Unger Vetlesen; January 31, 1889; Oslo, Norway
- Died: March 22, 1955 (aged 66); Queens, New York, US
- Occupation: Philanthropist

Georg Unger Vetlesen (January 31, 1889 – March 22, 1955) was a Norwegian-American shipbuilder and philanthropist.

== Background ==
Vetlesen was born in Oslo, Norway, the son of a well-known Norwegian surgeon. At age eleven, he became a crew member on a ship bound for Copenhagen. He earned degrees in naval architecture and mechanical engineering from the Imperial Institute of London, and went on to work for a British shipbuilding firm. In 1913, Vetlesen migrated to Canada where he worked as a miner. In 1916 he migrated to the United States and worked in the shipbuilding industry.

== Career ==
During World War II, Vetlesen worked to rebuild the Royal Norwegian Air Force. In 1943 he joined the United States Navy, as a Commander in the Special Forces headquarters in London to work with the Norwegian resistance. After the war, Vetlesen led the United States company representing the Norwegian America Line, and was a founder and chairman of the board of Scandinavian Airlines System.

== Personal life ==
In 1932, Vetlesen married Maude Monell (1877-1958), widow of Ambrose Monell (1873-1921), the former Chairman of International Nickel Company, Ltd. who had died in 1921. G. Unger Vetlesen died in Queens County, New York on March 22, 1955.

== G. Unger Vetlesen Foundation ==
G. Unger Vetlesen established the foundation which bears his name shortly before his death in 1955. In addition to the Vetlesen Prize, the foundation provides support in the Earth sciences for institutions of excellence. The prize is awarded for scientific achievement resulting in a clearer understanding of the Earth, its history, or its relations to the universe. The prize is awarded on average once every two years if the jury selects at least one worthy candidate during this period.

== See also ==
- Vetlesen Prize
- RV Vema

== Other Reading ==
- Smith, Richard Harris (2005) OSS. The Secret History of America's First Central Intelligence Agency (The Lyons Press) ISBN 978-1592287291
