= Robin Bell (scientist) =

American geophysicist

Robin E. Bell
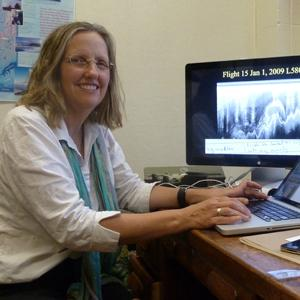
- Education: Columbia University
- Awards: Fellow of the American Geophysical Union
- Scientific career
- Fields: Geophysics
- Workplaces: Lamont–Doherty Earth Observatory, Columbia University
- Website: www.ldeo.columbia.edu/user/robinb

Robin Elizabeth Bell is an American geophysicist. She taught at Columbia University's Lamont–Doherty Earth Observatory and served as president of the American Geophysical Union from 2019 to 2021. Bell was co-ordinated the 2007 International Polar Year and was the first woman to chair the National Academy of Sciences Polar Research Board. She has made numerous discoveries with regard to subglacial lakes and ice sheet dynamics. She had a ridge, called Bell Buttress, in Antarctica named after her.

== Early life and education ==
Bell received her undergraduate degree in Geology from Middlebury College in Vermont; her MPhil from Columbia University in 1980; and her PhD in geophysics from Columbia University in 1989. She received an honorary degree from Middlebury College in 2006. Bell is a passionate sailor: with her husband and two children, she has sailed across the Atlantic several times, as well as the coasts of Newfoundland and Nova Scotia and the Labrador Sea.

== Career and impact ==
Bell is a scientist who has produced research on polar ice. Since 1989, she has led research at Columbia University's Lamont–Doherty Earth Observatory (LDEO) on ice sheets, tectonics, rivers and mid-ocean ridges. As LDEO's Palisades Geophysical Institute Lamont Research Professor, she directs research programs in Antarctica and Greenland and focuses on developing technology to monitor our changing planet.

Bell has played roles in coordinating international polar science initiatives, including the 2007 International Polar Year, which brought together 60,000 scientists from over 63 different nations to study rapidly changing elements of our planet; and the 2007 International Symposium on Antarctic Earth Sciences. She also was the first woman to chair the National Academy of Sciences Polar Research Board.

The Polar Regions are among the main geographical focuses of Bell's research. She has led, co-led, or coordinated nine major aero-geophysical expeditions to Antarctica and Greenland primarily investigating ice sheet dynamics and mass balance and continental dynamics with bearing on present and future climate. Her polar research has led to a number of important scientific discoveries. She discovered a volcano beneath the West Antarctic ice sheet as well as several large lakes locked beneath two miles of ice. During the International Polar Year, Bell lead a major expedition the Antarctica to explore the last unknown mountain range on Earth the completely ice-covered Gamburtsev Mountains. Her research in the Gamburtsev Mountains demonstrated that water hidden beneath the ice sheet runs uphill and that ice sheets can thicken from below, overturning long-held assumptions about ice sheets. Bell also is the lead Primary Investigator on the ROSETTA-Ice geophysical investigation of the Ross Ice Shelf the continent's largest ice shelf.

Bell's contributions to polar science also include the initiation of major technological developments: for example, Bell co-founded the first aerogeophysical research facility and conducted the first academic experimental demonstration of gravity with a small aircraft. Together with LDEO Polar Geophysics engineers, Bell developed IcePod, a bracket-mounted instrumentation suite that can be flown by LC130 aircraft operated in Greenland and Antarctica.

Bell also has initiated and led major research programs on the Hudson River for Columbia University. One of her major projects has been to assemble and lead Lamont's Hudson Valley Estuary Project team to map the Hudson River from Staten Island to Albany. The team defined crucial habitats and contaminated deposits and also discovered dozens of sunken ships and artifacts dating back to the Revolutionary War.

Bell also has contributed to the enhancement of diversity in science & engineering, and in particular, to the advancement of women in science. She was Director of ADVANCE at The Earth Institute of Columbia University a National Science Foundation (USA)-funded program intended to Expand Opportunities for Women in Science & Engineering; and she led an experiment in institutional transformation at Columbia University and affiliates in the Northeastern USA. She also is an advocate of education, integrating outreach, public education, and higher education through initiatives such as the Earth2Class education resource for teachers and Polar Explorer: Sea Level, an app released by the LDEO Polar exploration group.

In total Bell has contributed to over 100 peer-reviewed publications, as well as US Senate testimonies, National Academy reports and popular media publications. She is a Fellow of the American Geophysical Union, and has held a number of advisory committee memberships and directorships. She is currently Co-Chair of the US National Academy of Sciences Committee on the Development of a Strategic Vision for the U.S. Antarctic Program, Past President of AGU Crysphere Science Division, and AGU President-Elect, 2017–2019.

== Awards and honors ==
- 2019–2021: President of the American Geophysical Union
- 2017: President-Elect of the American Geophysical Union
- 2011: Elected Fellow of the American Geophysical Union
- 2006: Honorary Doctorate of Science, Middlebury College
- 2005: National Academy of Sciences's Polar Research Board named a mile-long Antarctic ridge, Bell Buttress, after Bell in honor of her two terms as head of the board
- 1996: Emma Willard School Young Alumnae Award
- 1992: Stroke Doherty Junior Scientist Award
- 1988: Outstanding Student Paper, Geodesy – Fall AGU
