= Amy Chouest =

American research vessel

History

United States
- Name: Amy Chouest
- Owner: Edison Chouest Offshore
- Completed: 1993
- Identification: IMO number: 7805239
- Fate: Scrapped in 2016

General characteristics
- Type: Offshore support vessel
- Length: 265 feet (81 m)
- Capacity: 33 researchers
- Crew: 16

Amy Chouest was an offshore supply vessel. She was chartered, for a time, by the United States Government, which used her as a research vessel. She was struck by an explosion, in 1992, that killed two researchers.

The Amy Chouest was chartered to supplement the MV Cory Chouest, a similar vessel on a long-term charter to conduct research that used very loud underwater noises. Sounds in the range 10,000,000 joules were used. The Amy Chouest was chartered to research the impact of the massive noise on marine life. Ian Anderson, writing in New Scientist, reported that environmental activists were concerned the loud noises would deafen marine animals.

Two deaths occurred on March 11, 1992. The two men worked for Marine Specialty, a firm hired to carry out some of the research. A depth charge accidentally exploded on deck, killing the men, but without causing significant damage to the ship. United Press International speculated that the deaths occurred during an experiment that included the covert involvement of Trident submarines, based on initial United States Navy reports that said that submarines had not surfaced, or fired any weapons, at the time of the explosion.
