= RV Marcus G. Langseth =

American research vessel

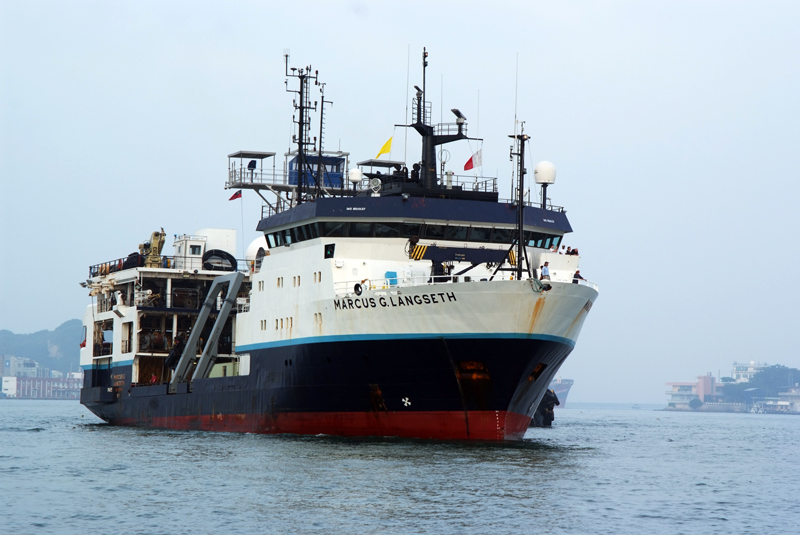
- RV Marcus G. Langseth, operated by the Lamont–Doherty Earth Observatory

History
- Owner: National Science Foundation
- Operator: Columbia Climate School, Lamont–Doherty Earth Observatory
- Builder: Ulstein (Norway)
- Launched: 15 June 1991
- Completed: 1991
- Acquired: 2004
- Identification: IMO number: 9010137; MMSI number: 367059880; Callsign: WDC6698
- Status: Active
- Notes: Originally constructed as a seismic vessel the Marcus G. Langseth was modified and outfitted to perform the tasks required of a general purpose research vessel.

General characteristics
- Tonnage: 3,834 GT
- Displacement: 2578.4
- Length: 71.5 m (234 ft 7 in)
- Beam: 17.0 m (55 ft 9 in)
- Draft: 5.9 m (19 ft 4 in)
- Ice class: Baltic IA
- Installed power: 2 x shaft generators 1665 KVA each
- Propulsion: 2 x Bergen BRG-6 2650 kW/3550 hp (each); 1 x Tunnel 590 kW/800 hp bow thruster
- Speed: 13 knots (24 km/h; 15 mph) max
- Crew: 20 crew, 35 scientific

RV Marcus Langseth is a research vessel operated by the Lamont–Doherty Earth Observatory (LDEO) of Columbia University as a part of the University-National Oceanographic Laboratory System (UNOLS) fleet. The Marcus G. Langseth was dedicated on December 4, 2007, came into service in early 2008, replacing the RV Maurice Ewing.

Marcus G. Langseth is intended primarily to collect multichannel seismic data, including 3D surveys. The ship was purchased from the geophysical survey company WesternGeco in 2004, having previously been named Western Legend. The Marcus G. Langseth was named for Marcus G. Langseth, a Lamont scientist.

In March 2009, Chinese authorities denied the vessel permission to pass between Taiwan and China. In August 2009, Marcus G. Langseth was named in a Canadian lawsuit seeking to halt its seismic tomography experiment. The lawsuit was dismissed, diplomatic clearance was issued and the ship sailed after a delay of a day.
