= SOFAR channel =

Water layer used in ocean surveillance

Underwater sound speed as a function of depth. Data derived from readings taken north of Hawaii in the Pacific Ocean and sourced from the World Ocean Atlas, 2005 edition. Note the SOFAR channel axis at ca. 750 m depth, where sound speed is shown at its lowest.

The SOFAR channel (short for sound fixing and ranging channel), or deep sound channel (DSC), is a horizontal layer of water in the ocean at which depth the speed of sound is at its minimum. The SOFAR channel acts as a waveguide for sound, and low frequency sound waves within the channel may travel thousands of miles before dissipating. An example was reception of coded signals generated by the US Navy-chartered ocean surveillance vessel Cory Chouest off Heard Island, located in the southern Indian Ocean (between Africa, Australia and Antarctica), by hydrophones in portions of all five major ocean basins and as distant as the North Atlantic and North Pacific. (Note: Figure 1 of the reference "The Heard Island Feasibility Test" (Munk) shows ray paths to receiving locations. Table 1 lists the sites with one being a Canadian research vessel with a towed array off Cape Cod.)

This phenomenon is an important factor in ocean surveillance. The deep sound channel was discovered and described independently by Maurice Ewing and J. Lamar Worzel at Columbia University and Leonid Brekhovskikh at the Lebedev Physics Institute in the 1940s. In testing the concept in 1944 Ewing and Worzel hung a hydrophone from Saluda, a sailing vessel assigned to the Underwater Sound Laboratory, with a second ship setting off explosive charges up to 900 nmi (1,000 mi; 1,700 km) away.

== Principle ==
Acoustic pulses travel great distances in the ocean because they are trapped in an acoustic wave guide. This means that as acoustic pulses approach the surface they are turned back towards the bottom, and as they approach the ocean bottom they are turned back towards the surface. The ocean conducts sound very efficiently, particularly sound at low frequencies, i.e., less than a few hundred Hz

Temperature is the dominant factor in determining the speed of sound in the ocean. In areas of higher temperatures (e.g. near the ocean surface), there is higher sound speed. Temperature decreases with depth, with sound speed decreasing accordingly until temperature becomes stable and pressure becomes the dominant factor. The axis of the SOFAR channel lies at the point of minimum sound speed at a depth where pressure begins dominating temperature and sound speed increases. This point is at the bottom of the thermocline and the top of the deep isothermal layer and thus has some seasonal variance. Other acoustic ducts exist, particularly in the upper mixed layer, but the ray paths lose energy with either surface or bottom reflections. In the SOFAR channel, low frequencies, in particular, are refracted back into the duct so that energy loss is small and the sound travels thousands of miles. Analysis of Heard Island Feasibility Test data received by the Ascension Island Missile Impact Locating System hydrophones at an intermediate range of 9,200 km (5,700 mi; 5,000 nmi) from the source found "surprisingly high" signal-to-noise ratios, ranging from 19 to 30 dB, with unexpected phase stability and amplitude variability after a travel time of about 1 hour, 44 minutes and 17 seconds.

Profile showing sound channel axis and bottom at critical depth. Where bottom profile intrudes into the sound channel propagation is bottom limited.

Within the duct sound waves trace a path that oscillates across the SOFAR channel axis so that a single signal will have multiple arrival times with a signature of multiple pulses climaxing in a sharply defined end. (Note: The "History of the SOFAR Channel" reference has a recording and sonogram of the effect.) That sharply defined end representing a near axial arrival path is sometimes termed the SOFAR finale and the earlier ones the SOFAR symphony. Those effects are due to the larger sound channel in which ray paths are contained between the surface and critical depth. (Note: The term also has a biological oceanography application.) Critical depth is the point below the sound speed minimum axis where sound speed increases to equal the maximum speed above the axis. Where the bottom lies above critical depth the sound is attenuated, as is any ray path intersecting the surface or bottom. (Note: Figure 2 on page three of the Williams/Stephen/Smith reference is helpful in understanding critical depth, the SOFAR channel, the entire channel and the ray paths involved.)

Bathymetry profile with SOFAR channel axis depth, Heard Island to Ascension Island.

The channel axis varies most with its location reaching the surface and disappearing at high latitudes (above about 60°N or below 60°S) but with sound then traveling in a surface duct. A 1980 report by Naval Ocean Systems Center gives examples in a study of a great circle acoustic path between Perth, Australia and Bermuda with data at eight locations along the path. At both Perth and Bermuda the sound channel axis occurs at a depth of around 1,200 m (3,937 ft). Where the path meets the Antarctic Convergence at 52º south there is no deep sound channel but a 30 m (98 ft) in depth surface duct and a shallow sound channel at 200 m (656 ft). As the path turns northward, a station at 43º south, 16º east showed the profile reverting to the SOFAR type at 800 m (2,625 ft).

== Applications ==
The first practical application began development during World War II when the United States Navy began experimenting and implementing the capability to locate the explosion of a SOFAR bomb used as a distress signal by downed pilots. The difference in arrival times of the source at an unknown location and known locations allowed computation of the source's general location. The arrival times form hyperbolic lines of position similar to LORAN. The reverse, detection of timed signals from known shore positions at an unknown point, allowed calculation of the position at that point. That technique was given the name of SOFAR backwards: RAFOS. RAFOS is defined in the 1962 edition of The American Practical Navigator among the hyperbolic navigation systems.

The early applications relied on fixed shore stations, often termed SOFAR stations. An operational eastern Pacific system was begun in 1947 with planned stations at Monterey and Point Arena in California and one at Kaneohe in Hawaii. In California three hydrophones were planted in Monterey Canyon at 350 fathoms (2,100 ft; 640 m) and connected to the already built shore facility by 14 nmi (16 mi; 26 km) of cable. Another hydrophone was planted at 400 fathoms (2,400 ft; 732 m) connected to shore by 14 nmi (16 mi; 26 km) of cable. The plan for Monterey was for a total of seven hydrophones but tests showed the effects of the canyon walls interfered with timing accuracy so that relocation was required. That station was relocated to Point Sur with the work continuing in 1948.

On September 18, 1952 the two California, but not the Kaneohe station, recorded intense, unusual signals. The fact Kaneohe did not pick up the signal indicated the source was west of 180º longitude and the line of position of the California stations passed south of Tokyo. That acoustic event was being investigated when news of the Myōjin-shō eruption in seas south of Japan solved the mystery. The Japanese Maritime Safety Agency ship Kaiyo Maru No. 5 had gone silent after a transmission, destroyed in the eruption. Later analysis of the SOFAR recordings were correlated to the stages of that eruption including the quiet period with sudden eruption at the time the vessel went missing. That event was the first correlated SOFAR and volcanic event. Other earthquake events were correlated in the same period leading to consideration of SOFAR as a seismic detection system.

Several of the stations became acoustic research facilities as did the Bermuda SOFAR Station which was involved in the Perth to Bermuda experiment. The records of the Bermuda station are maintained by the Woods Hole Oceanographic Institute (WHOI). In the recent past SOFAR sources were deployed for special purposes in the RAFOS application. One such system deployed bottom moored sources off Cape Hatteras, off Bermuda and one on a seamount to send three precisely timed signals a day to provide approximately five-kilometre (3.1 mi; 2.7 nmi) accuracy.

The first application quickly became of intense interest to the Navy for reasons other than locating downed air crews. A Navy decision in 1949 led to studies by 1950 recommending the passive sonar potential of the SOFAR channel be exploited for the Navy's Anti-Submarine Warfare (ASW) effort. The recommendation included that $10 million a year be spent on research and development of the system. By 1951 a test array had proven the concept and by 1952 additional stations were ordered for the Atlantic. The first major exploitation of the SOFAR channel was for ocean surveillance in a classified program that led to the Sound Surveillance System (SOSUS). That system remained classified from inception until the fixed systems were augmented by mobile arrays to become the Integrated Undersea Surveillance System with the mission and nature of the system declassified in 1991. (Note: It is not entirely coincidental that some of the SOSUS shore facilities, termed Naval Facilities (NAVFAC), were located in the vicinity of older SOFAR stations. For example Naval Facility Bermuda and Naval Facility Point Sur. The local acoustics were already well known.)

Earthquake monitoring through the use of SOSUS after limited civilian access was granted to the Pacific Marine Environmental Laboratory (PMEL) of the National Oceanic and Atmospheric Administration in 1991 revealed ten times the number of offshore earthquakes with better localization than with land-based sensors. The SOSUS detection could sense earthquakes at about magnitude two rather than magnitude four. The system detected seafloor spreading and magma events in the Juan de Fuca Ridge in time for research vessels to investigate. As a result of that success, PMEL developed its own hydrophones for deployment worldwide to be suspended in the SOFAR channel by a float and anchor system.

=== Other applications ===
- Comprehensive Nuclear-Test-Ban Treaty Organization (CTBTO) - International Monitoring System (IMS)
- Missile Impact Location System (MILS): System to localize impact and location of test missile nose cones
- Ocean acoustic tomography: A technique to measure ocean temperatures and currents by the time delay of sounds between two distant instruments
- Project Mogul, based on the conjectured existence of a similar channel in the upper atmosphere
- Search for Malaysia Airlines Flight 370: Sounds carried by the SOFAR channel were analyzed to determine if they detected a possible ocean impact of a passenger jet that disappeared in the Southern Indian Ocean

== In nature ==
Mysterious low-frequency sounds, attributed to fin whales (Balaenoptera physalus), are a common occurrence in the channel. Scientists believe fin whales may dive down to this channel and sing to communicate with other fin whales many kilometers away.

== Popular culture ==
The novel The Hunt for Red October describes the use of the SOFAR channel in submarine detection.

== See also ==
- Bathythermograph
- RAFOS float
- Sofar bomb
- Sound Surveillance System (SOSUS)
- Underwater acoustics
