= RV Maurice Ewing =

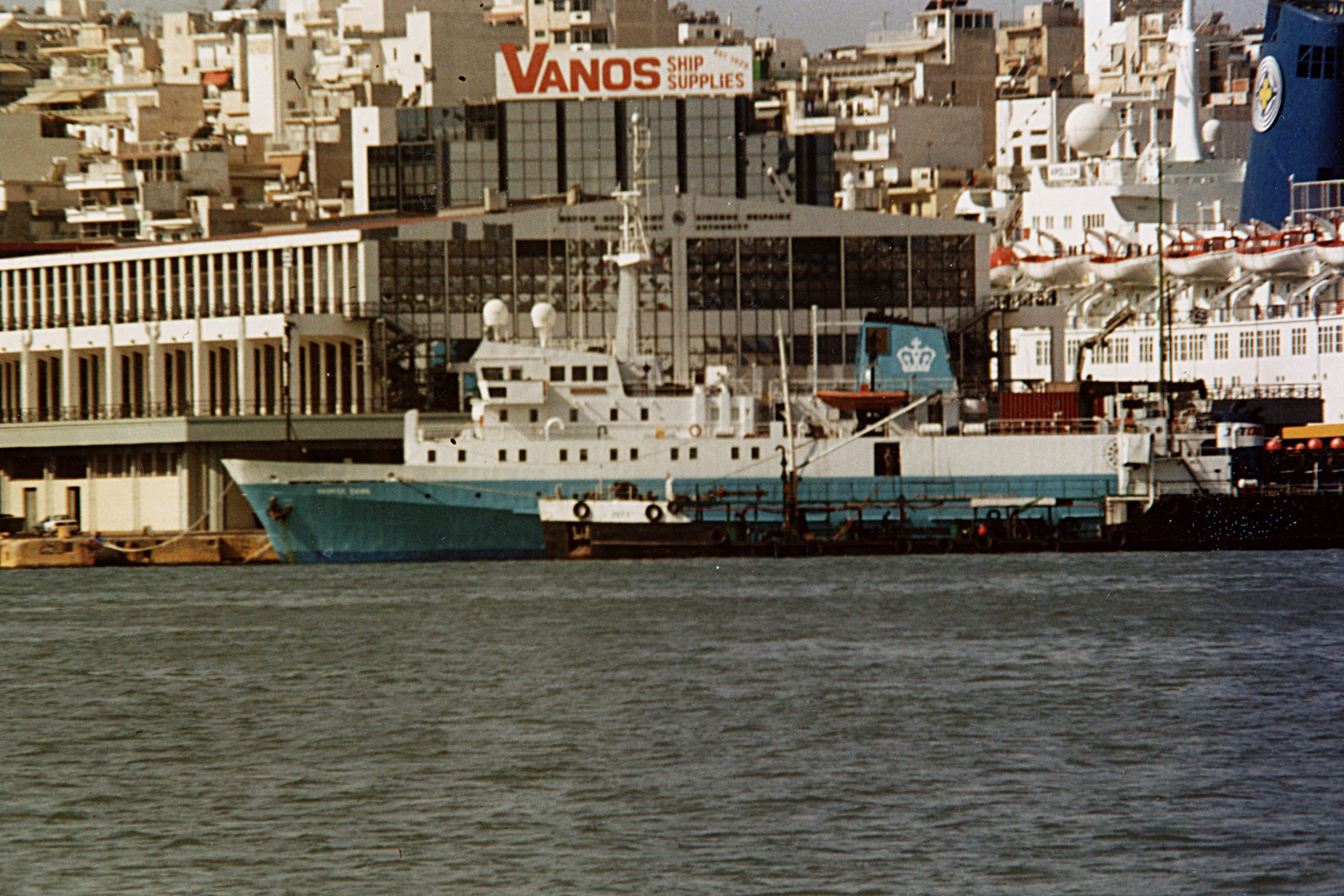
- R/V Maurice Ewing in Piraeus Port, Greece, August 2001

History
- Name: Bernier (1983–1988); Maurice Ewing (1988–)
- Namesake: William Maurice "Doc" Ewing
- Owner: Petro Canada (1983–1988); Columbia University (1988–)
- Operator: Lamont–Doherty Earth Observatory
- Identification: IMO number: 8203153; MMSI number: 525024131; Callsign: JZJF
- Fate: Retired 2005

General characteristics
- Type: Research vessel
- Tonnage: 1,976 GT
- Length: 230 ft (70 m)
- Speed: 11 knots (20 km/h; 13 mph)
- Endurance: 60 days

RV Maurice Ewing was a research vessel operated by the Lamont–Doherty Earth Observatory of Columbia University. It was retired in 2005 and replaced by RV Marcus Langseth in 2008. Although a multipurpose vessel, Maurice Ewing's notable capability was to collect multichannel seismic data.

Maurice Ewing was named for William Maurice "Doc" Ewing, geophysicist and first director of Lamont Geological Observatory (now known as Lamont–Doherty Earth Observatory).

The vessel was later renamed several times: - Scan Resolution, Bergan Resolution, the Reflect Resolution, and the NORDIC BAHARI. Still to this day the vessel operates as a multi-streamer seismic research vessel.
