= Sofar bomb =

Underwater position-fixing system

In oceanography, a sofar bomb (Sound Fixing And Ranging bomb), occasionally referred to as a sofar disc, is a long-range position-fixing system that uses impulsive sounds in the deep sound channel (SOFAR channel) of the ocean to enable pinpointing of the location of ships or crashed planes. The deep sound channel is ideal for the device, as the minimum speed of sound at that depth improves the signal's traveling ability. A position is determined from the differences in arrival times at receiving stations of known geographic locations. The useful range from the signal sources to the receiver can exceed 3,000 miles (4,800 km).

== Design ==
For this device to work as intended, it must have several qualities. Firstly, the bomb needs to detonate at the correct depth, so that it can take full advantage of the deep sound channel. The sofar bomb has to sink fast enough so that it reaches the required depth within a reasonable amount of time (usually about 5 minutes).

To determine the position of a sofar bomb that has been detonated, three or more naval stations combine their reports of when they received the signal.

== Benefits of the deep sound channel ==
Detonating the sofar bomb in the deep sound channel gives it huge benefits. The channel itself helps keep the sound waves contained within the same depth, as the rays of sound that have an upward or downward velocity are pushed back towards the deep sound channel because of refraction. Because the sound waves do not spread out vertically, the horizontal sound rays maintain far more strength than they would otherwise. This makes it far easier for the stations on shore to pick up and analyze the signal. Usually, the blasts use frequencies between 30 and 150 Hz, which also helps stop the signal from weakening too much. A side effect of this is that the slightly higher frequencies of sound waves emitted move a bit faster than the lower frequencies, making the signal that the naval stations hear have a longer duration.

== History ==
Dr. Maurice Ewing, a pioneer of oceanography and geophysics, first suggested putting small hollow metal spheres in pilots' emergency kits during World War II. The spheres would implode when they sank to the sofar channel, acting as a secret homing beacon to be received by microphones on coastlines that could pinpoint downed pilots' positions. This technology proved to be useful for the naval conflicts during World War II by providing a method for ships to accurately report their position without use of radio, or to find crashed planes and ships. During the war, the primary model of sofar bomb used by the United States was the Mk-22. It worked exceptionally well, and had an adjustable fuse for different depth detonations. The bomb was used with a chart that detailed the depth of the deep sound channel, so that the 4 pounds (1.8 kg) of TNT would explode at the correct time for its location (as the deep sound channel's actual depth varies with areas of the ocean). Its main safety mechanism was the detonator that could not trigger without a water pressure that corresponded to at least 750 feet (230 m).
