= Ocean acoustic tomography =

Technique used to measure temperatures and currents over large regions of the ocean

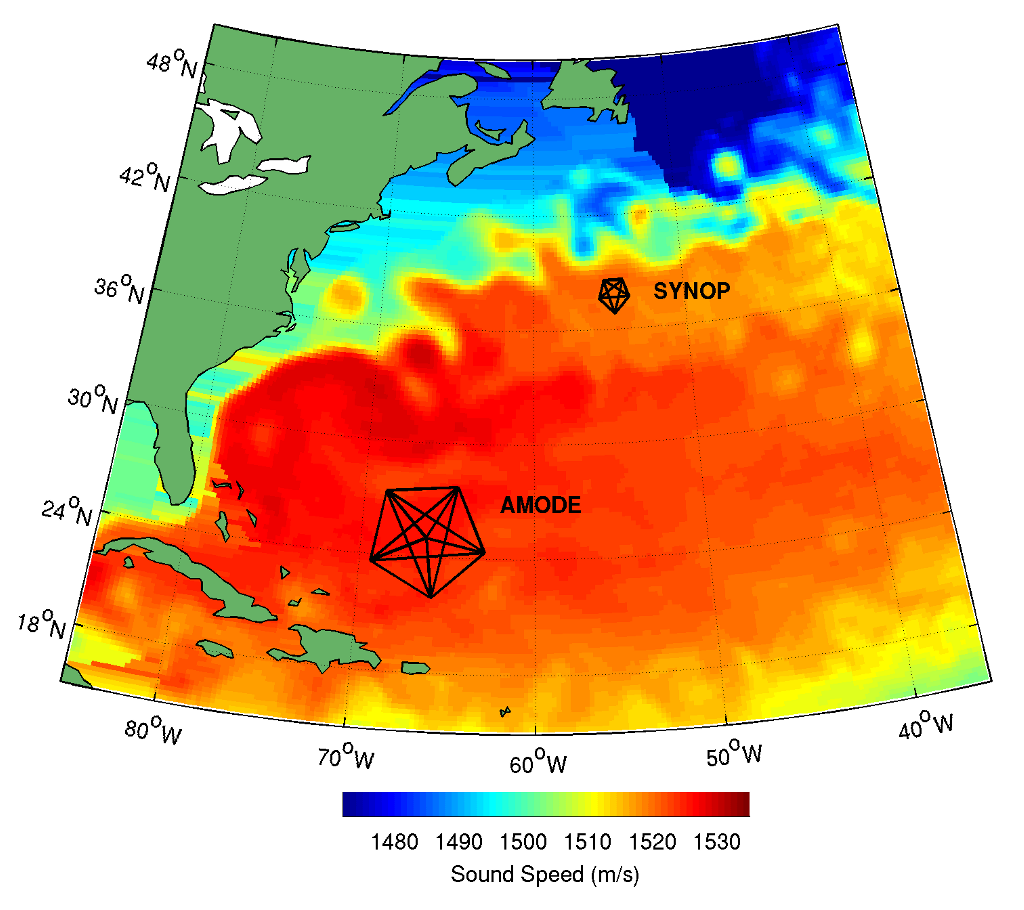
The western North Atlantic showing the locations of two experiments that employed ocean acoustic tomography. AMODE, the "Acoustic Mid-Ocean Dynamics Experiment" (1990-1), was designed to study ocean dynamics in an area away from the Gulf Stream, and SYNOP (1988-9) was designed to synoptically measure aspects of the Gulf Stream. The colors show a snapshot of sound speed at 300 metres (980 ft) depth derived from a high-resolution numerical ocean model. One of the key motivations for employing tomography is that the measurements give averages over the turbulent ocean.

Ocean acoustic tomography is a technique used to measure temperatures and currents over large regions of the ocean. On ocean basin scales, this technique is also known as acoustic thermometry. The technique relies on precisely measuring the time it takes sound signals to travel between two instruments, one an acoustic source and one a receiver, separated by ranges of 100–5,000 kilometres (54–2,700 nmi). If the locations of the instruments are known precisely, the measurement of time-of-flight can be used to infer the speed of sound, averaged over the acoustic path. Changes in the speed of sound are primarily caused by changes in the temperature of the ocean, hence the measurement of the travel times is equivalent to a measurement of temperature. A 1 °C (1.8 °F) change in temperature corresponds to about 4 metres per second (13 ft/s) change in sound speed. An oceanographic experiment employing tomography typically uses several source-receiver pairs in a moored array that measures an area of ocean.

== Motivation ==
Seawater is an electrical conductor, so the oceans are opaque to electromagnetic energy (e.g., light or radar). The oceans are fairly transparent to low-frequency acoustics, however. The oceans conduct sound very efficiently, particularly sound at low frequencies, i.e., less than a few hundred hertz. These properties motivated Walter Munk and Carl Wunsch to suggest "acoustic tomography" for ocean measurement in the late 1970s. The advantages of the acoustical approach to measuring temperature are twofold. First, large areas of the ocean's interior can be measured by remote sensing. Second, the technique naturally averages over the small scale fluctuations of temperature (i.e., noise) that dominate ocean variability.

From its beginning, the idea of observations of the ocean by acoustics was married to estimation of the ocean's state using modern numerical ocean models and the techniques assimilating data into numerical models. As the observational technique has matured, so too have the methods of data assimilation and the computing power required to perform those calculations.

== Multipath arrivals and tomography ==
Propagation of acoustic ray paths through the ocean. From the acoustic source at left, the paths are refracted by faster sound speed above and below the SOFAR channel, hence they oscillate about the channel axis. Tomography exploits these "multipaths" to infer information about temperature variations as a function of depth. Note that the aspect ratio of the figure has been greatly skewed to better illustrate the rays; the maximum depth of the figure is only 4.5 km, while the maximum range is 500 km.

One of the intriguing aspects of tomography is that it exploits the fact that acoustic signals travel along a set of generally stable ray paths. From a single transmitted acoustic signal, this set of rays gives rise to multiple arrivals at the receiver, the travel time of each arrival corresponding to a particular ray path. The earliest arrivals correspond to the deeper-traveling rays, since these rays travel where sound speed is greatest. The ray paths are easily calculated using computers ("ray tracing"), and each ray path can generally be identified with a particular travel time. The multiple travel times measure the sound speed averaged over each of the multiple acoustic paths. These measurements make it possible to infer aspects of the structure of temperature or current variations as a function of depth. The solution for sound speed, hence temperature, from the acoustic travel times is an inverse problem.

== The integrating property of long-range acoustic measurements ==
Ocean acoustic tomography integrates temperature variations over large distances, that is, the measured travel times result from the accumulated effects of all the temperature variations along the acoustic path, hence measurements by the technique are inherently averaging. This is an important, unique property, since the ubiquitous small-scale turbulent and internal-wave features of the ocean usually dominate the signals in measurements at single points. For example, measurements by thermometers (i.e., moored thermistors or Argo drifting floats) have to contend with this 1-2 °C noise, so that large numbers of instruments are required to obtain an accurate measure of average temperature. For measuring the average temperature of ocean basins, therefore, the acoustic measurement is quite cost effective. Tomographic measurements also average variability over depth as well, since the ray paths cycle throughout the water column.

== Reciprocal tomography ==
"Reciprocal tomography" employs the simultaneous transmissions between two acoustic transceivers. A "transceiver" is an instrument incorporating both an acoustic source and a receiver. The slight differences in travel time between the reciprocally traveling signals are used to measure ocean currents, since the reciprocal signals travel with and against the current. The average of these reciprocal travel times is the measure of temperature, with the small effects from ocean currents entirely removed. Ocean temperatures are inferred from the sum of reciprocal travel times, while the currents are inferred from the difference of reciprocal travel times. Generally, ocean currents (typically 10 cm/s (3.9 in/s)) have a much smaller effect on travel times than sound speed variations (typically 5 m/s (16 ft/s)), so "one-way" tomography measures temperature to good approximation.

== Applications ==
In the ocean, large-scale temperature changes can occur over time intervals from minutes (internal waves) to decades (oceanic climate change). Tomography has been employed to measure variability over this wide range of temporal scales and over a wide range of spatial scales. Indeed, tomography has been contemplated as a measurement of ocean climate using transmissions over antipodal distances.

Tomography has come to be a valuable method of ocean observation, exploiting the characteristics of long-range acoustic propagation to obtain synoptic measurements of average ocean temperature or current. One of the earliest applications of tomography in ocean observation occurred in 1988-9. A collaboration between groups at the Scripps Institution of Oceanography and the Woods Hole Oceanographic Institution deployed a six-element tomographic array in the abyssal plain of the Greenland Sea gyre to study deep water formation and the gyre circulation. Other applications include the measurement of ocean tides, and the estimation of ocean mesoscale dynamics by combining tomography, satellite altimetry, and in situ data with ocean dynamical models. In addition to the decade-long measurements obtained in the North Pacific, acoustic thermometry has been employed to measure temperature changes of the upper layers of the Arctic Ocean basins, which continues to be an area of active interest. Acoustic thermometry was also recently been used to determine changes to global-scale ocean temperatures using data from acoustic pulses sent from one end of the Earth to the other.

== Acoustic thermometry ==
Acoustic thermometry is an idea to observe the world's ocean basins, and the ocean climate in particular, using trans-basin acoustic transmissions. "Thermometry", rather than "tomography", has been used to indicate basin-scale or global scale measurements. Prototype measurements of temperature have been made in the North Pacific Basin and across the Arctic Basin.

Starting in 1983, John Spiesberger of the Woods Hole Oceanographic Institution, and Ted Birdsall and Kurt Metzger of the University of Michigan developed the use of sound to infer information about the ocean's large-scale temperatures, and in particular to attempt the detection of global warming in the ocean. This group transmitted sounds from Oahu that were recorded at about ten receivers stationed around the rim of the Pacific Ocean over distances of 4,000 km (2,500 mi). These experiments demonstrated that changes in temperature could be measured with an accuracy of about 20 millidegrees. Spiesberger et al. did not detect global warming. Instead they discovered that other natural climatic fluctuations, such as El Nino, were responsible in part for substantial fluctuations in temperature that may have masked any slower and smaller trends that may have occurred from global warming.

The Acoustic Thermometry of Ocean Climate (ATOC) program was implemented in the North Pacific Ocean, with acoustic transmissions from 1996 through fall 2006. The measurements terminated when agreed-upon environmental protocols ended. The decade-long deployment of the acoustic source showed that the observations are sustainable on even a modest budget. The transmissions have been verified to provide an accurate measurement of ocean temperature on the acoustic paths, with uncertainties that are far smaller than any other approach to ocean temperature measurement.

Repeating earthquakes acting as naturally occurring acoustic sources have also been used in acoustic thermometry, which may be particularly useful for inferring temperature variability in the deep ocean which is presently poorly sampled by in-situ instruments.

The ATOC prototype array was an acoustic source located just north of Kauai, Hawaii, and transmissions were made to receivers of opportunity in the North Pacific Basin. The source signals were broadband with frequencies centered on 75 Hz and a source level of 195 dB re 1 micropascal at 1 m, or about 250 watts. Six transmissions of 20-minute duration were made on every fourth day.

== Acoustic transmissions and marine mammals ==
The ATOC project was embroiled in issues concerning the effects of acoustics on marine mammals (e.g. whales, porpoises, sea lions, etc.). Public discussion was complicated by technical issues from a variety of disciplines (physical oceanography, acoustics, marine mammal biology, etc.) that makes understanding the effects of acoustics on marine mammals difficult for the experts, let alone the general public. Many of the issues concerning acoustics in the ocean and their effects on marine mammals were unknown. Finally, there were a variety of public misconceptions initially, such as a confusion of the definition of sound levels in air vs. sound levels in water. If a given number of decibels in water are interpreted as decibels in air, the sound level will seem to be orders of magnitude larger than it really is - at one point the ATOC sound levels were erroneously interpreted as so loud the signals would kill 500,000 animals. The sound power employed, 250 W, was comparable those made by blue or fin whales, although those whales vocalize at much lower frequencies. The ocean carries sound so efficiently that sounds do not have to be that loud to cross ocean basins. Other factors in the controversy were the extensive history of activism where marine mammals are concerned, stemming from the ongoing whaling conflict, and the sympathy that much of the public feels toward marine mammals.

As a result of this controversy, the ATOC program conducted a $6 million study of the effects of the acoustic transmissions on a variety of marine mammals. The acoustic source was mounted on the bottom about a half mile deep, hence marine mammals, which are bound to the surface, were generally further than a half mile from the source. The source level was modest, less than the sound level of large whales, and the duty cycle was 2% (i.e., the sound is on only 2% of the day). After six years of study the official, formal conclusion from this study was that the ATOC transmissions have "no biologically significant effects".

Other acoustics activities in the ocean may not be so benign insofar as marine mammals are concerned. Various types of man-made sounds have been studied as potential threats to marine mammals, such as airgun shots for geophysical surveys, or transmissions by the U.S. Navy for various purposes. The actual threat depends on a variety of factors beyond noise levels: sound frequency, frequency and duration of transmissions, the nature of the acoustic signal (e.g., a sudden pulse, or coded sequence), depth of the sound source, directionality of the sound source, water depth and local topography, reverberation, etc.

== Types of transmitted acoustic signals ==
Tomographic transmissions consist of long coded signals (e.g., "m-sequences") lasting 30 seconds or more. The frequencies employed range from 50 to 1000 Hz and source powers range from 100 to 250 W, depending on the particular goals of the measurements. With precise timing such as from GPS, travel times can be measured to a nominal accuracy of 1 millisecond. While these transmissions are audible near the source, beyond a range of several kilometers the signals are usually below ambient noise levels, requiring sophisticated spread-spectrum signal processing techniques to recover them.

== See also ==
- Acoustical oceanography
- Ray tracing
- SOFAR channel
- SOSUS
- Speed of sound
- TOPEX/Poseidon satellite altimetry
- Underwater acoustics
