= John Elliott Nafe =

American oceanographer and geophysicist

John Elliott (Jack) Nafe (July 22, 1914 in Seattle – April 6, 1996) was an American oceanographer and geophysicist best known for his work on acoustic propagation in the oceans and solid earth.

Born in Seattle, Nafe received his bachelor's degree from the University of Michigan in 1938. He then served in the United States Merchant Marine, leaving to begin graduate studies at Washington University in St. Louis. He obtained an MS degree in 1940 and then joined the Navy during World War II, during which he taught physics and engineering at the U.S. Naval Academy.

Returning to graduate studies at Columbia University after the war, he worked with I.I. Rabi on a celebrated experiment that determined the magnetic moment of the hydrogen atom. He received his Ph.D. in 1948.

Nafe was for three years a faculty member at the University of Minnesota, after which he returned to Columbia's Lamont Geological Observatory, where he began to study the acoustic properties of the oceans as they are affected by temperature, salinity, and pressure. For the U.S. Navy, he worked on a listening system for detecting submerged submarines at long distances.

Nafe's acoustical research later turned to the solid earth, where he was among the first to develop an accurate relation between density and seismic velocity, allowing inferences about the structure of the Earth.

Nafe was chair of Columbia's geology department from 1962 to 1965. He suffered a severe stroke in 1976 and retired to Vancouver in 1980.
