= MV Cory Chouest =

US Navy research and surveillance ship

- MV Cory Chouest

History

United States
- Name: Cory Chouest
- Owner: Edison Chouest Offshore
- Launched: 6 April 1974
- Acquired: leased for 5 years by the U.S. Navy, date unknown
- In service: as MV Cory Chouest in 1989
- Identification: IMO number: 7382536; MMSI number: 303401000; Callsign: WRYF
- Fate: Returned to Louisiana for redelivery to the owners

General characteristics
- Type: ocean surveillance ship
- Tonnage: 2,667 DWT
- Length: 265 ft (81 m)
- Beam: 60 ft (18 m)
- Draft: 14 ft (4.3 m)
- Propulsion: two diesels, two shafts, 4,000bhp
- Speed: 11 knots
- Complement: 16 civilian mariners, 41 military and sponsors
- Sensors & processing systems: both passive and active low frequency sonar arrays
- Armament: none

MV Cory Chouest is an ocean surveillance ship leased by the U.S. Navy in 1989 and assigned to the Navy’s Special Missions Program. Cory Chouest had all SURTASS equipment removed and was returned to her original owners in 2008 completing nearly 20 years of service.

== Construction ==
Cory Chouest was acquired and modified by Edison Chouest Offshore for use by the U.S. Navy as a modified TAGOS vessel. Originally used as a research platform in conjunction with the Amy Chouest, the Cory was later modified to carry an active and passive sonar system. The vessel served until October 2008 when it went off charter.

== Mission ==
The mission of Cory Chouest is to directly support the Navy by using both passive and active low frequency sonar arrays to detect and track undersea threats.

== Operational history ==
In January 1991, the Cory Chouest and Amy Chouest were used as part of the Heard Island feasibility test, an experiment to transmit low frequency sound through the ocean from Heard Island in the Southern Indian Ocean as far as both ocean coasts of the US and Canada. The Cory Chouest was chosen because of its central moon pool and because it was already equipped with an array of low frequency transmitters. A phase-modulated 57Hz signal was used. The experiment was successful and demonstrated that such sound waves could travel as far as the antipodes. Planned transmissions had been for ten days, although owing to the bad weather conditions and the high failure rate of the transmitter elements, used at a frequency below their design frequency, the transmissions were terminated on the sixth day, when only two of the original ten transducers were still working.

== Note ==
There is no journal entry on Cory Chouest at DANFS.
