= Lamont–Doherty Earth Observatory =

Scientific observatory in the United States

Coordinates: 41.004°N 73.907°W

Lamont-Doherty Earth Observatory
- Type: Non-profit research institute
- Founded: 1948
- Headquarters: Palisades, New York
- Key people: Steven L. Goldstein, Interim Director
- Parent: Columbia University
- Website: www.ldeo.columbia.edu

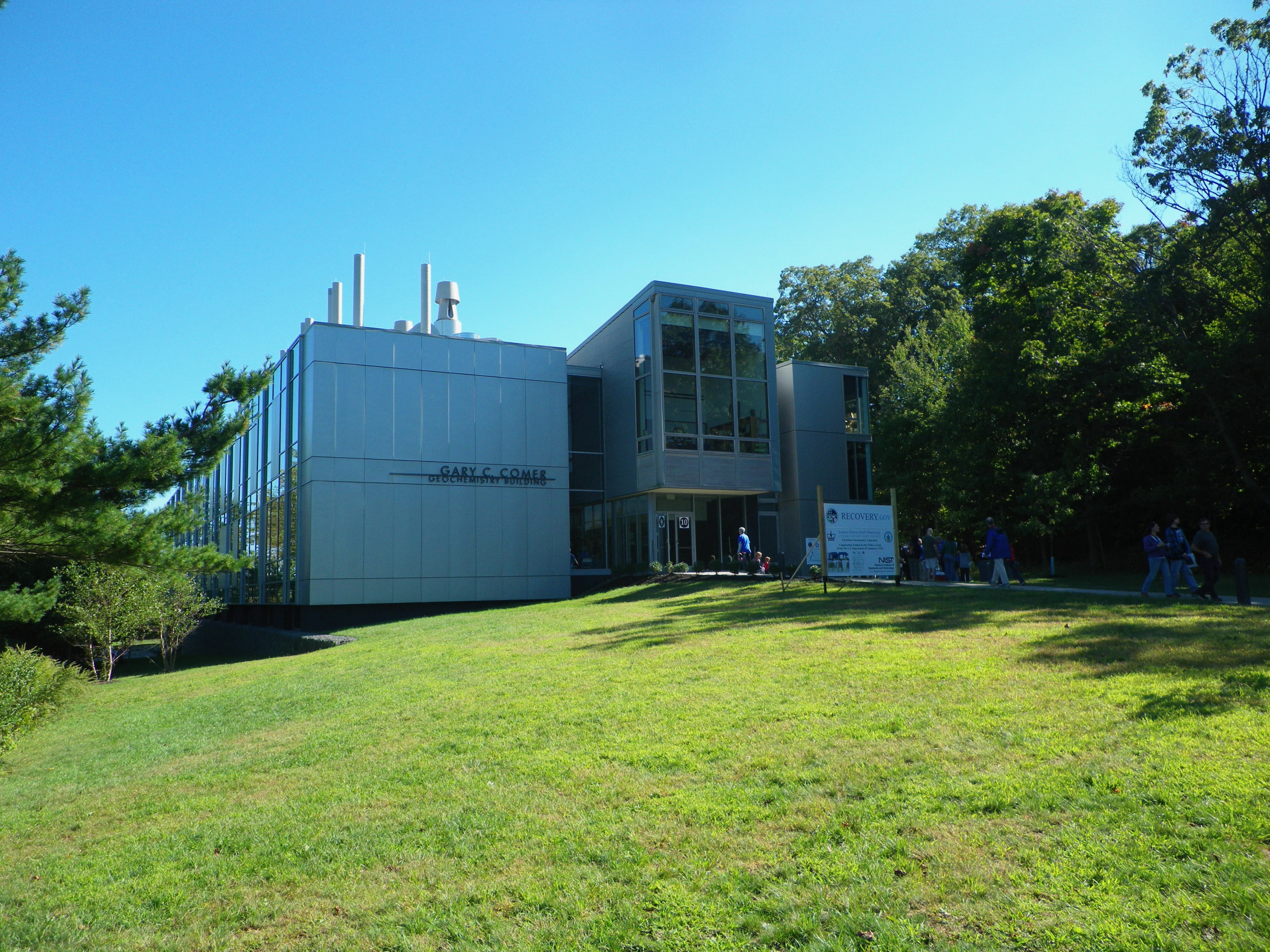
Gary C. Comer Building Geochemistry Building on the Lamont-Doherty (LDEO) campus

The Lamont–Doherty Earth Observatory (LDEO) is a research institution of Columbia University specializing in the Earth system science. It is located on its own campus north of Manhattan in Palisades, New York.

The observatory was one of the centers of research that led to the development of the theory of plate tectonics as well as many other notable scientific developments.

== Campus ==
LDEO is located in Palisades, New York, on a property overlooking the Hudson River which was once the weekend residence of banker Thomas W. Lamont. It was donated to the university in 1948 by his widow, Florence Lamont. In 1969, the Observatory was renamed "Lamont-Doherty" following a gift from the Henry L. and Grace Doherty Charitable Foundation.

== Research ==
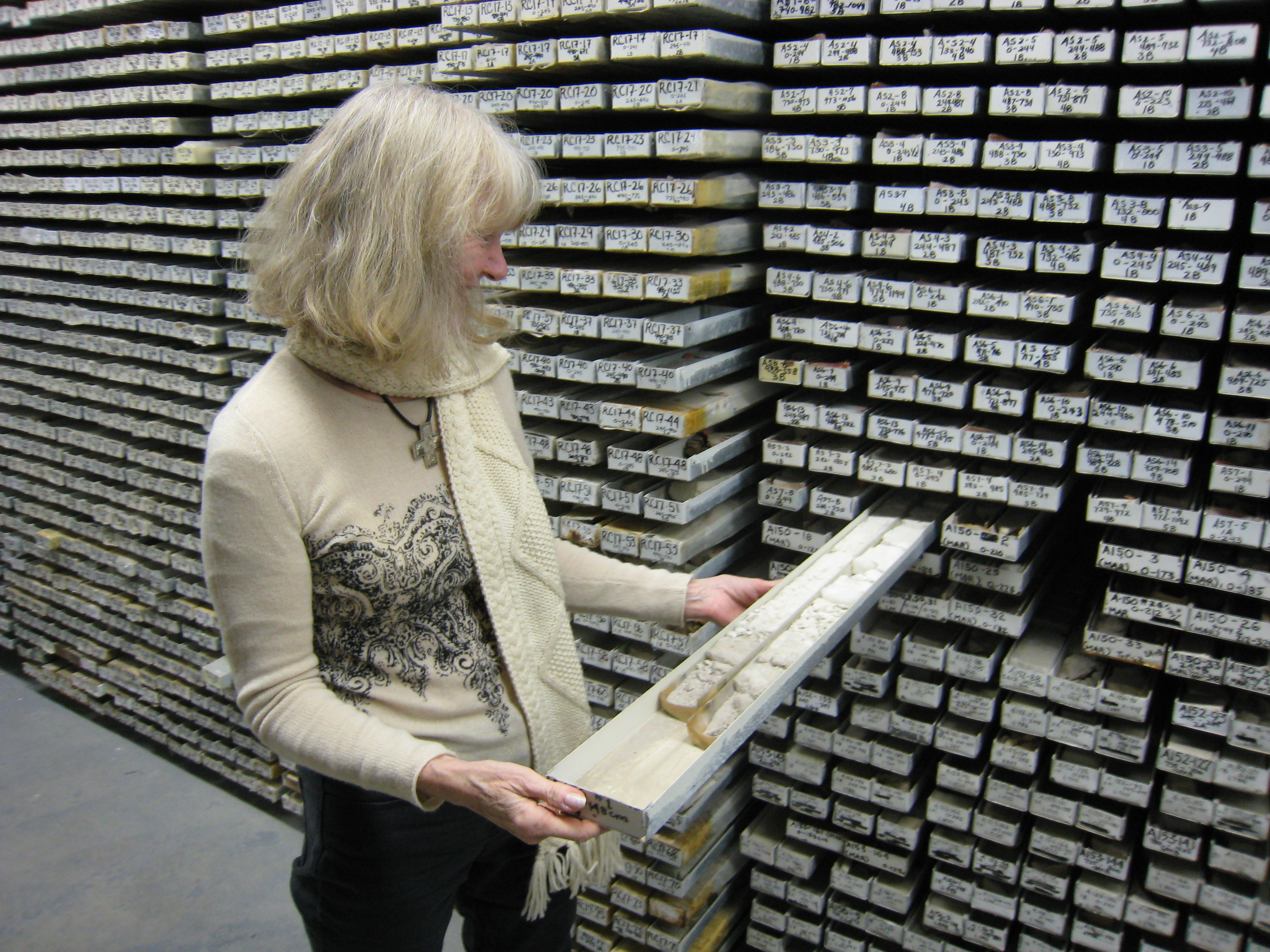
A part of the Core Repository

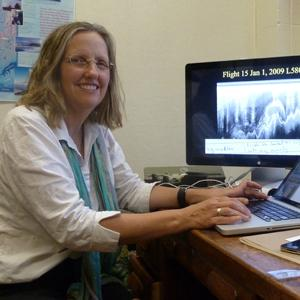
LDEO researcher Robin Bell

=== Climate change ===
The LDEO is a substantial source of data for the US government in relation to climate change. Faculty at the LDEO have been noted for giving climate change testimony to Congress in relation to melting ice sheets. NOAA has also noted the LDEO's Global Ocean Surface Water Partial Pressure of CO2 Database as being an instrumental source of partial pressure carbon dioxide data (pCO_{2}), which can, in turn, detail the amount of carbon dioxide dissolved in the earth's oceans. Many versions of the LDEO database have been published over the years, dating back to 2006.

==== Tree rings ====
The tree-ring lab at the LDEO studies the effects on climate and climate change on trees. In an interview, Nicole Davi from the LDEO noted findings like the formation of tree-rings during extended dry seasons, as well as work being done to carbon-date trees to verify tree ring data.

==== Core repository ====
The core repository at the LDEO stores various drilled sediment samples from the earth's oceans. The samples have been used to detail climate changes between glaciation periods, in context of dissolved elements and gases, like calcium (from shells) and carbon dioxide.

=== Earthquakes ===
A major source of past earthquake data comes from the Lamont–Doherty Earth Observatory/National Center for Earthquake Engineering Research (NCEER) Earthquake Strong Motion Database.

=== Antarctic mapping ===
In 2012, Voice of America documented the work done by LDEO researcher Robin Bell, and others, in mapping the land underneath the Antarctica ice sheet. Several notable findings included the discovery of hidden rivers, hidden mountain ranges, and significant geothermal energy below the ice.

=== Other ===
Other examples of LDEO's research are:

- Seismic activity following nuclear weapons testing.
- Continental drift: in the North Atlantic, and, separately, their effects on the magnetic field.
- The "ocean-atmosphere system."
- Future weather in El Niño events.
- The relationship between weather and yields.
- The relationship between rotation of the core and seismic activity.
- The sea floor.
- Ice ages.
- Solar weather.
- Seismic activity on the moon.

== Research vessels ==
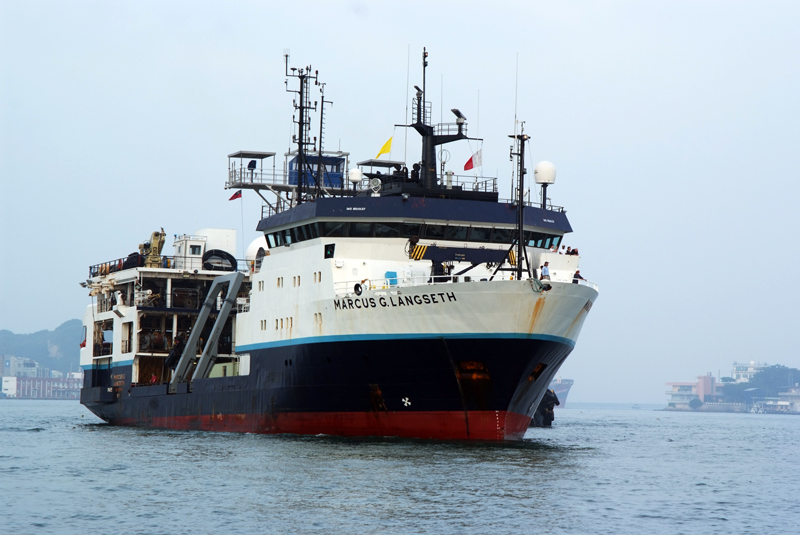
The RV Marcus G. Langseth

RV Marcus Langseth is a research vessel operated by the Lamont–Doherty Earth Observatory (LDEO) of Columbia University as a part of the University-National Oceanographic Laboratory System (UNOLS) fleet. The Marcus G. Langseth was dedicated on December 4, 2007, came into service in early 2008, replacing the RV Maurice Ewing.

== Directors ==
1. Maurice Ewing (1949–1972)
2. Manik Talwani (1972–1980)
3. Neil Opdyke (1981; interim)
4. C. Barry Raleigh (1981–1989)
5. Dennis V. Kent (1989–1990; interim)
6. Gordon Eaton (1990–1994)
7. John C. Mutter (1994–1996; interim)
8. Peter M. Eisenberger (1996–1999)
9. John C. Mutter (1999–2000; interim)
10. G. Michael Purdy (2000–2011)
11. Arthur L. Lerner-Lam (2011–2012; interim)
12. Sean Solomon (2012–2020)
13. Maureen Raymo (2020–2023)
14. Stephen L. Goldstein (2023–present; interim)

== Notable people ==
- Robin Bell
- Wallace Smith Broecker - popularized the term global warming
- Bruce C. Heezen - mapped the Mid-Atlantic Ridge in the 1950s
- Terry Plank
- Marie Tharp - oceanic cartographer whose work led to the consensus on the plate tectonics and continental drift theories.
