= Thomas Thompson =

Thomas, Tommy or Tom Thompson may refer to:

== Politics ==
- Thomas Thompson (banker) (1754–1828), Hull banker, British MP for Midhurst, Wesleyan, father of Thomas Perronet Thompson
- Thomas W. Thompson (1766–1821), U.S. representative and senator from New Hampshire
- Thomas Perronet Thompson (1783–1869), British politician and reformer
- Thomas Charles Thompson (1821–1892), British MP for City of Durham, 1874 and 1880–1885
- Thomas Thompson (New Zealand politician) (1832–1919), New Zealand politician
- Thomas Larkin Thompson (1838–1898), U.S. representative from California, ambassador to Brazil
- Thomas Henry Thompson (1866–1925), Ontario merchant, undertaker and political figure
- Thomas Thompson (Australian politician) (1867–1947), Australian politician
- Thomas Alfred Thompson (1868–1953), Ontario farmer and political figure
- Thomas Josiah Thompson, Sierra Leonean lawyer and politician
- Tommy Thompson (born 1941), U.S. politician and governor of Wisconsin
- Tommy Thompson (Kentucky politician) (born 1948), U.S. politician and state legislator in Kentucky
- Tommy Thompson (Arkansas politician) (fl. 2010–2015), U.S. member of the Arkansas House of Representatives (D-AR)
- T. P. Thompson (Arizona politician)

== Sports ==
=== American football ===
- Tom Thompson (American football), American college football kicker and coach
- Tommy Thompson (quarterback) (1916–1989), American pro football quarterback in 1940s
- Tommy Thompson (linebacker) (1927–1990), American pro football linebacker
- Tommy Thompson (punter) (born 1972), American pro football punter

=== Association football (soccer) ===
- Thomas Thompson (footballer) (1879–1939), English footballer for Small Heath
- Tom Thompson (footballer, born 1894) (1894–?), English footballer
- Tom Thompson (Australian soccer), Australian soccer player
- Tommy Thompson (footballer, born 1928) (1928–2015), English footballer, Aston Villa and Preston North End
- Tommy Thompson (footballer, born 1938), English footballer, Blackpool and York City
- Tommy Thompson (soccer) (born 1995), American soccer player

=== Baseball ===
- Tommy Thompson (pitcher) (1889–1963), American baseball player
- Tommy Thompson (outfielder) (1910–1971), American baseball player
- Tommy Thompson (baseball, born 1947) (1947–2019), American minor league baseball player and manager

=== Other sports ===
- Thomas E. Thompson (1885–?), American college basketball coach
- Thomas Thompson (cricketer) (born 1934), English cricketer
- Tommy Thompson (NASCAR racing driver) (1922–1986), American stock car racing driver
- Tommy Thompson (racing driver, born 1943) (1943–1978), Formula Super Vee racing driver
- Tommy Thompson (rugby union) (1886–1916), or Gerald Thompson, South Africa rugby player
- Tommy Thompson (rugby league) (fl. 1920–1930s), rugby league player for England and Warrington

== Other ==
- Thomas Thompson (Master of Christ's College, Cambridge) (died 1540), Master of Christ's 1508–1517
- Thomas Thompson (herald) (died 1641), Rouge Dragon Pursuivant in the reign of James VI and I
- Thomas Thompson (priest) (1756–1799), Anglican priest in Ireland
- Sir Thomas Thompson, 1st Baronet (1766–1828), Royal Navy admiral
- Thomas Thompson (songwriter) (1773–1816), Tyneside poet
- Thomas Clement Thompson (1780–1857), Irish artist
- Thomas Thompson (businessman) (1797-1869), American businessman and art collector
- Thomas W. Thompson (Medal of Honor) (1839–1927), American Medal of Honor recipient
- Thomas Phillips Thompson (1843–1933), English-born journalist and humorist
- Thomas Thompson (writer) (1880-1951), Lancashire author and broadcaster (1880-1951)
- Thomas Gordon Thompson (1888–1961), American chemist and oceanographer
  - RV Thomas G. Thompson (T-AGOR-23), an oceanographic research ship
  - USNS Thomas G. Thompson (T-AGOR-9), an oceanographic research ship
- T. W. Thompson (1888–1968), English folklorist
- Thomas Thompson (American author) (1933–1982), American journalist and author
- Thomas Everett Thompson (1933–1990), British malacologist and embryologist
- Thomas L. Thompson (born 1939), American biblical scholar
- Thomas Martin Thompson (1955–1998), executed for rape and murder
- Thomas J. Thompson (fl. from 1981), American television director
- Tommy Thompson (Royal Navy officer) (1894–1966), World War II British naval officer
- Llewellyn Thompson (1904–1972), known as Tommy, United States ambassador to the Soviet Union and to Austria
- Tommy Thompson (type designer) (1906–1967), American calligrapher, graphic artist and typeface designer
- Tommy Thompson (parks commissioner) (1913–1985), Toronto's first Commissioner of Parks
- Tommy Thompson, birth name Willoughby Harry Thompson (1919–2018), British colonial administrator
- Tommy Gregory Thompson (born 1952), known for his leading role in the rediscovery of SS Central America

== Characters ==
- Tommy Thompson, fictional character in The Adventures of Smilin' Jack

== See also ==
- Thomson and Thompson, fictional characters in the comics series The Adventures of Tintin
- Thomas Thomson (disambiguation)
