= RV Roger Revelle =

Oceanographic Research Ship

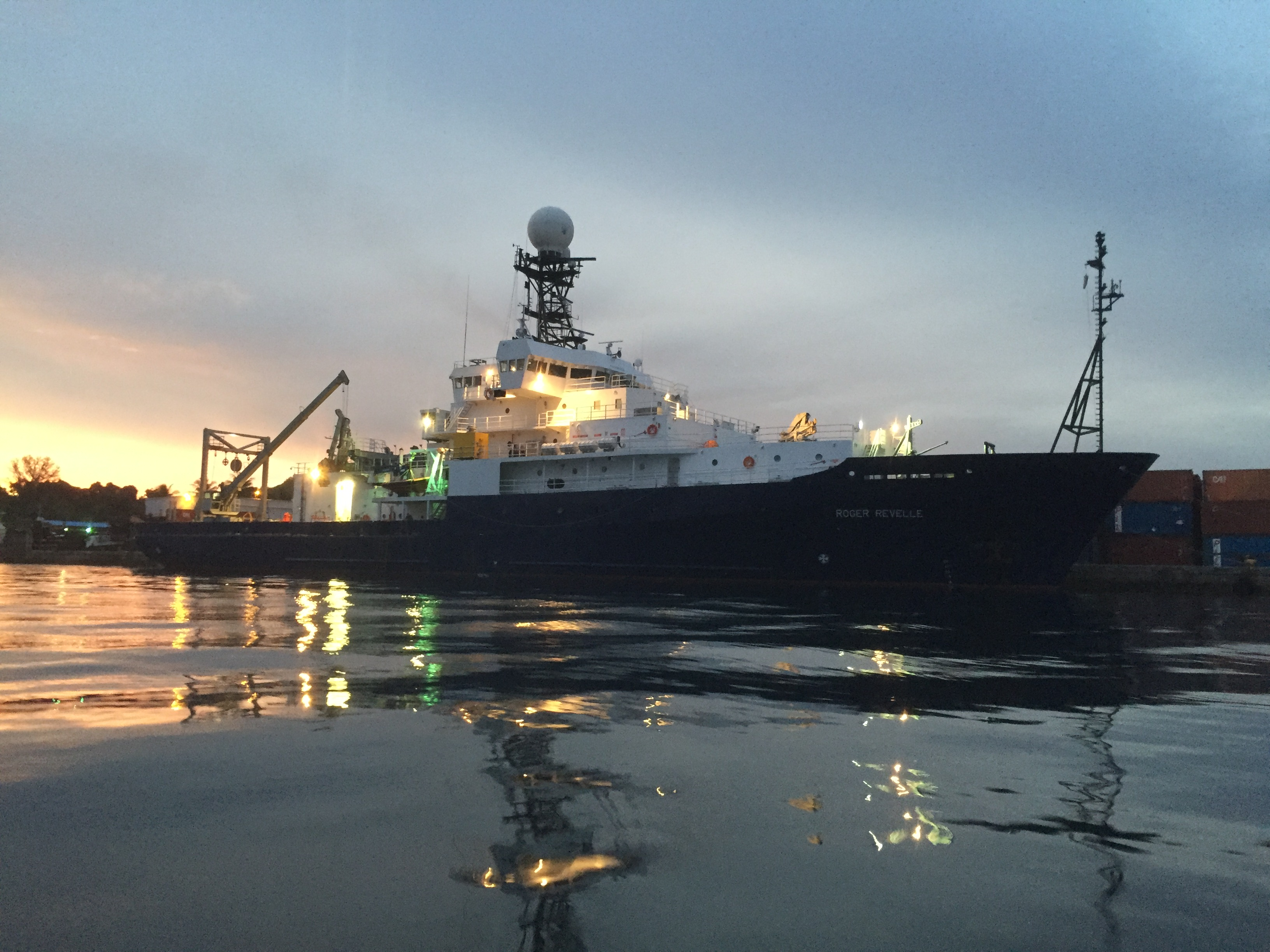
- RV Roger Revelle in Koror, Palau in 2016

History

United States
- Name: Roger Revelle
- Namesake: Roger Randall Dougan Revelle, a scientist, Naval officer, and scholar of the University of California, San Diego, founder of Office of Naval Research, and was one of the first scientists to study global warming and the movement of Earth's tectonic plates
- Owner: U.S. Navy
- Operator: Scripps Institution of Oceanography, University of California, San Diego under agreement with Office of Naval Research
- Builder: Halter Marine Inc., Gulfport, Mississippi
- Laid down: 9 December 1993
- Launched: 20 April 1995
- Acquired: by the U.S. Navy, 11 June 1996, as RV Roger Revelle (T-AGOR-24)
- Maiden voyage: Mississippi to San Diego, California, in July 1996
- In service: leased to Scripps Institution of Oceanography, University of California, San Diego, June 1996
- Home port: Point Loma, San Diego, California
- Identification: IMO number: 9075228; MMSI number: 367800100; Callsign: KAOU; State I.D#: CF6354XF

General characteristics
- Class & type: Thomas G Thompson-class oceanographic research ship
- Tonnage: 3,180 GT; 954 ITC Net Tonnage
- Displacement: 3,512 long tons
- Length: 277 ft (84.4 m)
- Beam: 52 ft 5 in (16.0 m)
- Draft: 17 ft (5.2 m)
- Propulsion: diesel-electric, two 3,000 hp (2,200 kW) z-drives; 1,180 hp (880 kW) Azimuthing jet
- Speed: 11.7 knots (21.7 km/h; 13.5 mph)
- Range: 15,000 nmi (28,000 km; 17,000 mi) at 12 knots (22 km/h; 14 mph) (fuel)
- Endurance: 52 days at 12 kn (fuel)
- Capacity: Fuel: 227,500 (planning); 4,000 sq ft (370 m^{2}) lab space; Provision for at least six 20 ft (6.1 m) lab vans
- Crew: 22 civilian mariners; 37 scientific party

RV Roger Revelle is a Thomas G. Thompson-class oceanographic research ship operated by Scripps Institution of Oceanography under charter agreement with Office of Naval Research as part of the University-National Oceanographic Laboratory System (UNOLS) fleet. The ship is named after Roger Randall Dougan Revelle, who was essential to the incorporation of Scripps into the University of California San Diego.

== Construction and characteristics ==
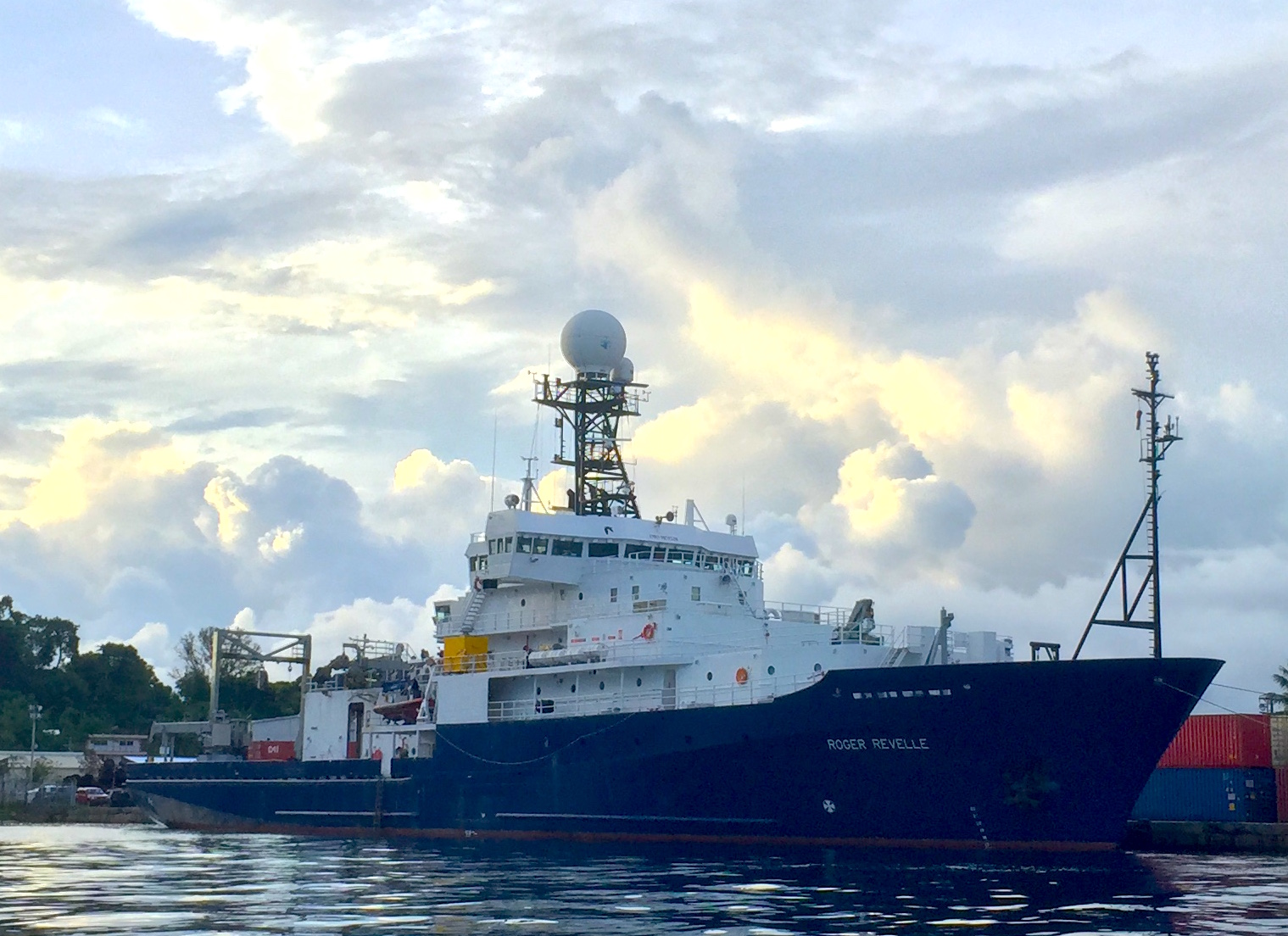
Roger Revelle, berthed in Palau in 2016

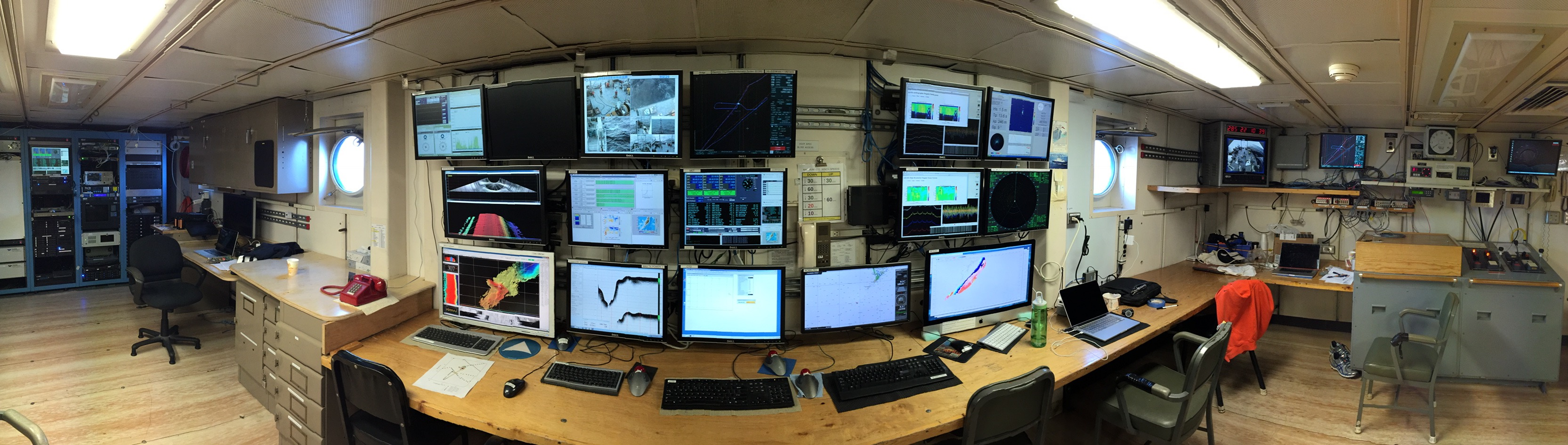
Computer lab

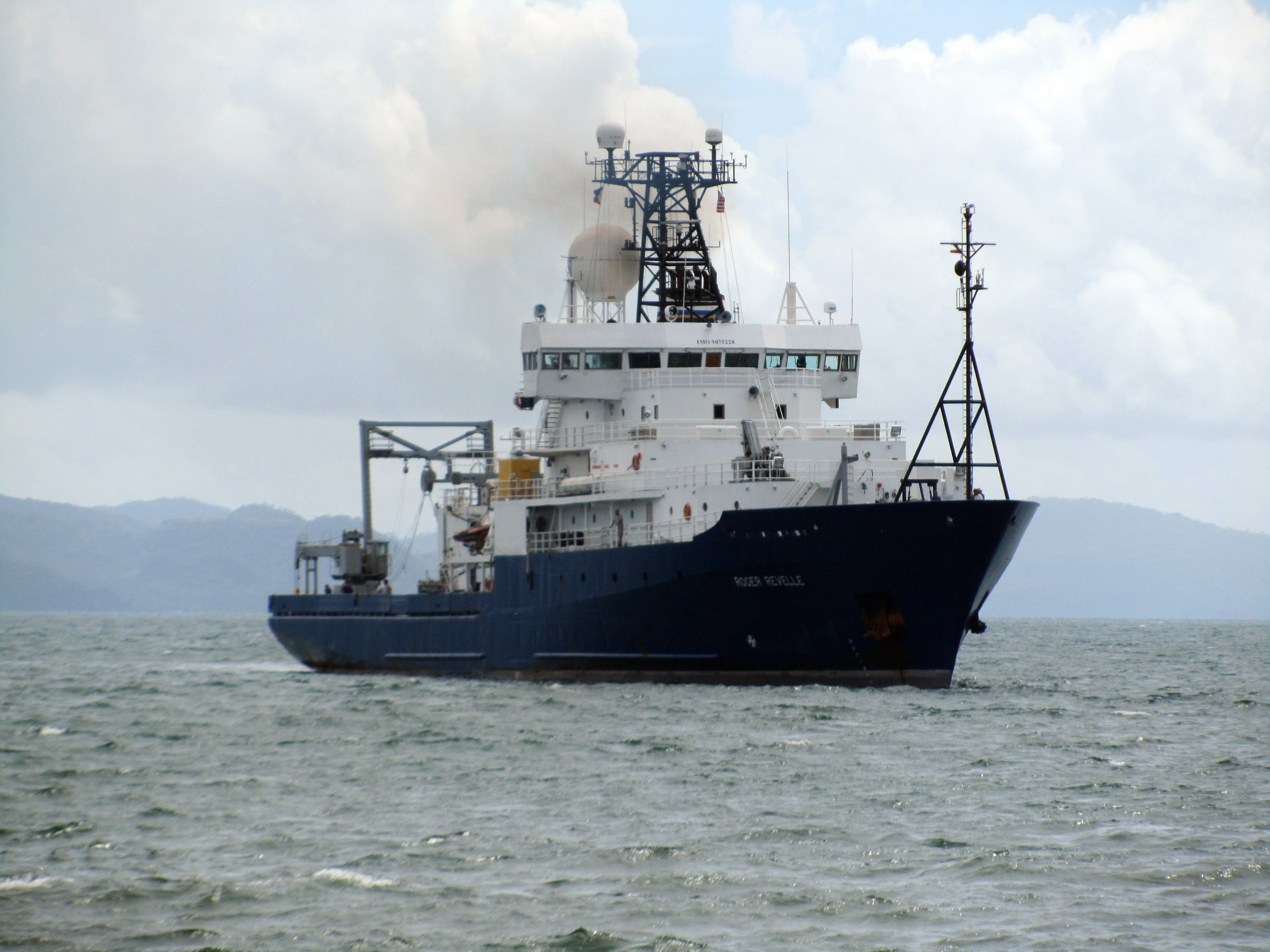
Legazpi, Philippines, 2012

Roger Revelle was built by Halter Marine Inc., Gulfport, Mississippi. She was laid down on 9 December 1993 and launched on 20 April 1995. She was delivered to the U.S. Navy 11 June 1996, as RV Roger Revelle (T-AGOR-24), a Thomas G. Thompson-class oceanographic research ship. Her maiden voyage was from Gulfport to San Diego, California, the following month. She is a sister ship to the RV Thomas G. Thompson (UW), NOAAS Ronald H. Brown (NOAA) and RV Atlantis (Woods Hole), all built upon the same design.

The Roger Revelle underwent a $60 million refit between 2019 and 2020, where over six miles of cable were replaced. The refit overhauled the power systems, ballast management, bow thruster (to a new retractable ZF thruster), refurbished the A-frame, and added a scientific gondola. The refit is estimated to add 15 years of operational life to the ship (until 2035).

=== Navigational capabilities ===
- GPS Furuno GP150 (2)
- ADU GPS Ashtech Attitude-sensing System
- RADAR Sperry 3 cm, 10 cm
- Acoustic Positioning System Nautronix 916 SBL/LBL
- Fathometer Furuno FV 700 50 kHz
- Doppler Speed Log – ODEC 200 kHz
- Doppler Speed Log – EDO 600 kHz
- Dynamic Positioning - Kongsberg DP-System
- ADF - Kongsberg-Simrad Taiyo
- Gyro - Sperry MK 37 (2)

=== Data acquisition sensors and processing systems ===
As of 2014, the ship comes standard with these set of Oceanographic sensors; with provisions, space, and modularity to add a variety of other scientific sensors and equipment.

- Furuno FAR2117 X-Band Radar coupled to a WAMOS wave and surface current monitoring system. Configured to 1.5 nm range, with antenna rotation speed at 42 rpm.
- RD Instruments 75 & 150 kHz broadband Acoustic Doppler Currents Profiler (ADCP), running University of Hawaii SOEST's UHDAS software.
- UCSD Ocean Physics Group 50 and 140 kHz High-Resolution Hydrographic Doppler Sonar System (HDSS), using UCSD-OPG's HDSS software (similar in function to the ADCP).
- Bell BGM-3 Gravimeter, with LaCoste & Romberg portable gravimeter for gravity tie and calibration.
- Turo Quoll Fast Deep XBT system
- Kongsberg EM122 multibeam echosounder sonar (bathymetry)
- Knudsen Engineering 3260 and 320B/R 3.5 & 12 kHz singlebeam echosounder sub-bottom profiler.
- iXBlue Hydrins, and Phins-III are the main Motion Reference Units (Gyro's) used by the ship's standard Oceanographic sensors, with feeds available throughout the ship in UDP or Serial formats.
- Trimble SPS351, Furuno GP150, and Ashtech ADU3 GPS' provide redundant and accurate GPS and attitude information at various frequencies for the science equipment. These feeds can be accessed throughout the vessel by science teams via either UDP or Serial.
- Trimble GPS and End Run time servers that provides NTP GPS-derived time, IRIG-B and 1 PPS synronization along with other time measurements
- UCSD-SIO MET; a comprehensive meteorological system and software suite developed by Scripps Institution of Oceanography, providing wind speed/direction, relative humidity, barometric pressure, long and shortwave radiation, air temperature, sea surface temperature, and precipitation. The software also provides a winch load data during towing, dredging, and CTD operations.
- SeaBird scientific CTD, sampling rosette frame, and auxiliary oceanographic sensors.

=== Winches ===
- Markey DUTW-9-11 traction-drum winch with dual storage drums. Normally 15,000 m of 9/16" 3 x 19 trawl wire is on one storage drum and 10,000 m of 0.680" electromechanical cable on the other. Wires over the side lead to A-frame or main deck crane. Capable of fiber optic cable through A-frame.
- Markey DESH 5 hydrographic winch, with 10,000 m of 1/4" 3 x 19 hydrographic wire, or 10,000 m of 0.322" three-conductor electromechanical CTD cable on Lebus grooving. Wire drums are interchangeable, one is stowed while the other is in use. Wires lead over starboard side via retractable hydroboom.
- CAST-6/Allied Crane CTD Handling System with 10,000 m of 0.322" three-conductor electromechanical CTD cable on Lebus grooving. Wire leads over starboard side via Allied crane articulating boom.
- Assorted portable winch and wire combinations available for cruise-specific requirements.

=== Support equipment ===
- Primary, North American cranes (3) on starboard quarter, main deck and on port side, 02 level.
- Morgan Marine cranes (2), normally on foredeck and at other locations to suit mission.
- Fritz-Culver A-frame at stern, retractable hydroboom on starboard side by staging bay door.
- Blue Extension crane on starboard 01 aft of rescue boat davit.
- Extensive (~3,000) bolt down fittings for securing removable equipment on all decks and inside laboratories (2' X 2' pattern). 1" sockets outside, 1/2" sockets inside.
- Uncontaminated seawater supply to all labs (except computer lab).
- Through-hull instrument well in staging bay, nominal 24" diam. tube.
- Two installed Price A300 compressors provide 1850 psi air for seismic work.

=== Computing environment ===
Shipboard computer systems consists of a cluster of Linux (CentOS) servers capable of up to 20 Terabytes of available and expandable cruise data storage in RAID6 configuration. The cluster provides email, intranet, NAS, DHCP, proxy, SAMBA, Active Directory, data processing, and data procurement services. Internet is provided using a combination of UNOLS-designed proprietary satellite system (C-Band), shore cellular network (3G, 4G/LTE), and/or Inmarsat FleetBroadband (L-Band). In addition to the cluster, there is a wide array of data acquisition computers hooked up to a modular display array. All live processed data from the ship's standard set of acquisition systems is displayed on the array, and provide live feedback of the ship's underway data. There are repeating displays in the main lab, and hydro lab that shows MET and navigation data.

The various Windows, Linux, and Mac acquisition machines perform data acquisition, archiving and processing functions on many of the permanently installed data collection systems. All data is centralized in the cluster.

== Associated cruises ==
The Roger Revelle's first research cruise was for the 1996 CalCOFI cruise, which she commonly undertakes on an annual basis.

Roger Revelle and her sister ships are required for maintenance on the OOI Regional Cabled Array off the west coast of the United States. The Revelle is capable of deploying a 36-niskin rosette and has participated in several sections of the NSF GO-SHIP and GEOTRACES hydrography programs. She is large enough to accommodate for an ROV and associated equipment, thereby also making her capable of engineering cruises and exploration for hydrothermal vents. This included portions of the NOAA vents program (1980 - 2013).

With a large operational range, she is used to deploy floats (ARGO, GO-BGC, SOCCOM, etc.) in remote areas.

In December 2006, Roger Revelle departed from SIO's Nimitz Marine Facility in Point Loma and embarked on a six-year journey around the globe, stringing together 86 distinct missions. When finally returning to its home port, an estimated $300,000 was spent on upkeep maintenance.

In 2018, the Roger Revelle and Sally Ride were used to research zooplankton responses to phytoplankton blooms (and associated impacts on the biological pump), particularly in relation to Salps and climate change. The Roger Revelle was used to deploy the large MOCNESS net system, collecting biological samples from multiple depths.
