= Multibeam echosounder =

Type of sonar used to map the seabed

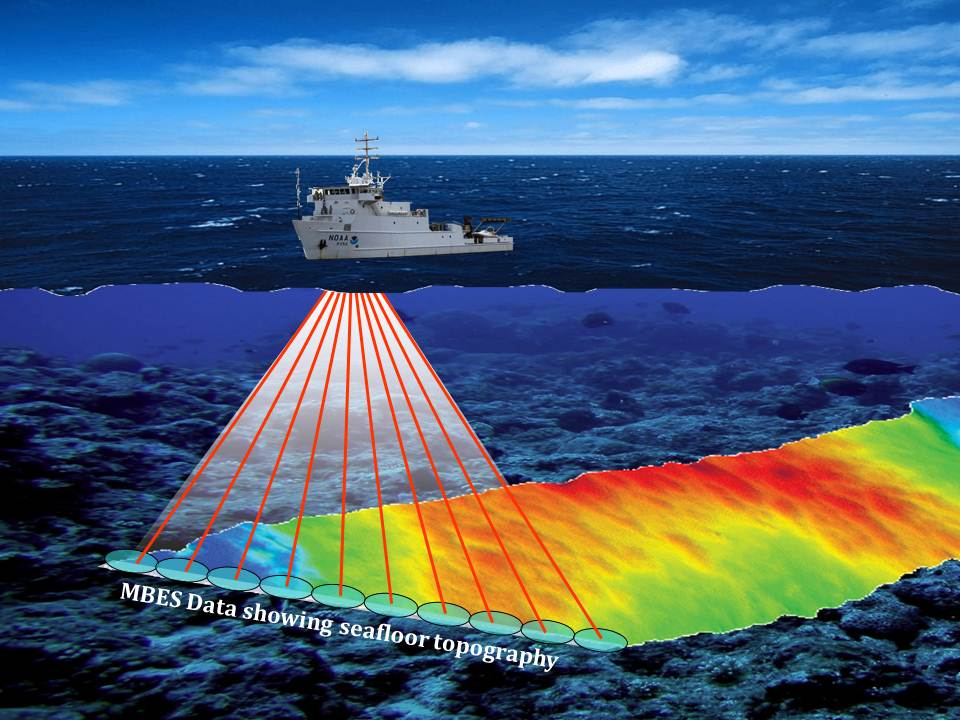
Multibeam sonar is used to map the ocean floor

A multibeam echosounder (MBES) is a type of sonar that is used to map the seabed. It emits acoustic waves in a fan shape beneath its transceiver. The time it takes for the sound waves to reflect off the seabed and return to the receiver is used to calculate the water depth. Unlike other sonars and echo sounders, MBES uses beamforming to extract directional information from the returning soundwaves, producing a swathe of depth soundings from a single ping.

== History and progression ==
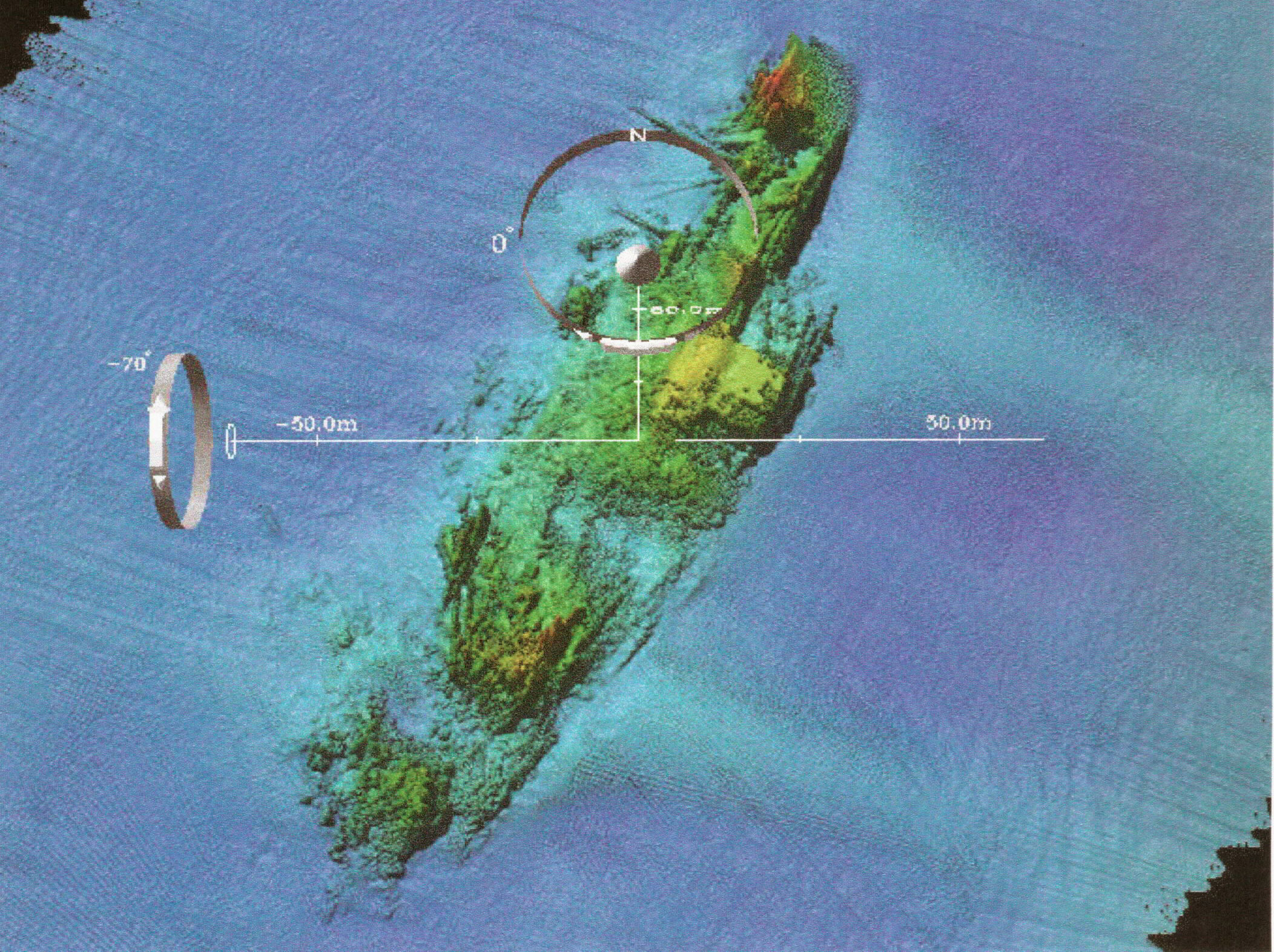
A multibeam image of the USS Susan B. Anthony (AP-72) shipwreck off the coast of France.

Multibeam sonar sounding systems, also known as swathe (British English) or swath (American English), originated for military applications. The concept originated in a radar system that was intended for the Lockheed U-2 high altitude reconnaissance aircraft, but the project was derailed when the aircraft flown by Gary Powers was brought down by a Soviet missile in May 1960. A proposal for using the "Mills Cross" beamforming technique adapted for use with bottom mapping sonar was made to the US Navy. Data from each ping of the sonar would be automatically processed, making corrections for ship motion and transducer depth sound velocity and refraction effects, but at the time there was insufficient digital data storage capacity, so the data would be converted into a depth contour strip map and stored on continuous film. The Sonar Array Sounding System (SASS) was developed in the early 1960s by the US Navy, in conjunction with General Instrument to map large swathes of the ocean floor to assist the underwater navigation of its submarine force. SASS was tested aboard the USS Compass Island (AG-153). The final array system, composed of sixty-one one degree beams with a swathe width of approximately 1.15 times water depth, was then installed on the USNS Bowditch (T-AGS-21), USNS Dutton (T-AGS-22) and USNS Michelson (T-AGS-23).

At the same time, a Narrow Beam Echo Sounder (NBES) using 16 narrow beams was also developed by Harris ASW and installed on the Survey Ships Surveyor, Discoverer and Researcher. This technology would eventually become Sea Beam Only the vertical centre beam data was recorded during surveying operations.

Starting in the 1970s, companies such as General Instrument (now SeaBeam Instruments, part of L3 Klein) in the United States, Krupp Atlas (now Atlas Hydrographic) and Elac Nautik (now part of the Wärtsilä Corporation) in Germany, Simrad (now Kongsberg Discovery) in Norway and RESON now Teledyne RESON A/S in Denmark developed systems that could be mounted to the hull of large ships, as well as on small boats (as technology improved, multibeam echosounders became more compact and lighter, and operating frequencies increased).

The first commercial multibeam is now known as the SeaBeam Classic and was put in service in May 1977 on the Australian survey vessel HMAS Cook. This system produced up to 16 beams across a 45-degree arc. The (retronym) term "SeaBeam Classic" was coined after the manufacturer developed newer systems such as the SeaBeam 2000 and the SeaBeam 2112 in the late 1980s.

The second SeaBeam Classic installation was on the French Research Vessel Jean Charcot. The SB Classic arrays on the Charcot were damaged in a grounding and the SeaBeam was replaced with an EM120 in 1991. Although it seems that the original SeaBeam Classic installation was not used much, the others were widely used, and subsequent installations were made on many vessels.

SeaBeam Classic systems were subsequently installed on the US academic research vessels USNS Thomas Washington (T-AGOR-10) (Scripps Institution of Oceanography, University of California), the USNS Robert D. Conrad (Lamont–Doherty Earth Observatory of Columbia University) and the RV Atlantis II (Woods Hole Oceanographic Institution).

In 1989, Atlas Electronics (Bremen, Germany) installed a second-generation deep-sea multibeam called Hydrosweep DS on the German research vessel Meteor. The Hydrosweep DS (HS-DS) produced up to 59 beams across a 90-degree swath, which was a vast improvement and was inherently ice-strengthened. Early HS-DS systems were installed on the RV Meteor (1986) (Germany), the RV Polarstern (Germany), the RV Maurice Ewing (US) and the ORV Sagar Kanya (India) in 1989 and 1990 and subsequently on a number of other vessels including the RV Thomas G. Thompson (US) and RV Hakurei Maru (Japan).

As multibeam acoustic frequencies have increased and the cost of components has decreased, the worldwide number of multibeam swathe systems in operation has increased significantly. The required physical size of an acoustic transducer used to develop multiple high-resolution beams, decreases as the multibeam acoustic frequency increases. Consequently, increases in the operating frequencies of multibeam sonars have resulted in significant decreases in their weight, size and volume characteristics. The older and larger, lower-frequency multibeam sonar systems, that required considerable time and effort mounting them onto a ship's hull, used conventional tonpilz-type transducer elements, which provided a usable bandwidth of approximately 1/3 octave. The newer and smaller, higher-frequency multibeam sonar systems can easily be attached to a survey launch or to a tender vessel. Shallow water multibeam echosounders, like those from Teledyne Odom, R2Sonic and Norbit, which can incorporate sensors for measuring transducer motion and sound speed local to the transducer, are allowing many smaller hydrographic survey companies to move from traditional single beam echosounders to multibeam echosounders. Small low-power multibeam swathe systems are also now suitable for mounting on an Autonomous Underwater Vehicle (AUV) and on an Autonomous Surface Vessel (ASV).

Multibeam echosounder data may include bathymetry, acoustic backscatter, and water column data. (Gas plumes now commonly identified in midwater multibeam data are termed flares.)

Type 1-3 piezo-composite transducer elements, are being employed in a multispectral multibeam echosounder to provide a usable bandwidth that is in excess of 3 octaves. Consequently, multispectral multibeam echosounder surveys are possible with a single sonar system, which during every ping cycle, collects multispectral bathymetry data, multispectral backscatter data, and multispectral water column data in each swathe.

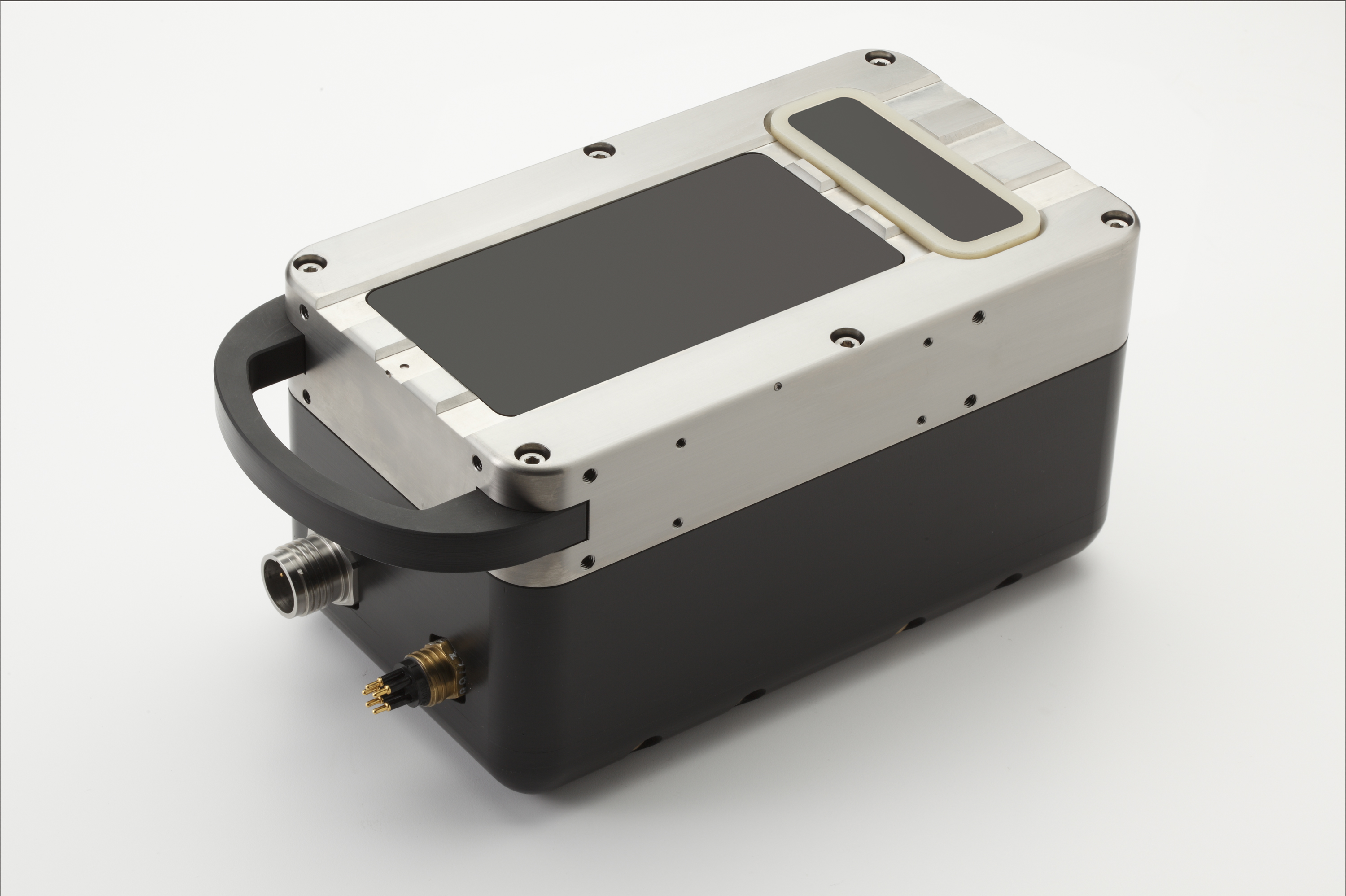
A multibeam echosounder showing the transmit array (larger black rectangle) and receive array (narrower rectangle) - Odom MB1

== Modern scientific uses ==
As technology improved in the 1980s and 1990s, higher-frequency systems which provided higher resolution mapping in shallow water were developed, and today such systems are widely used for shallow-water hydrographic surveying in support of navigational charting. Multibeam echosounders are also commonly used for geological and oceanographic research, and since the 1990s for offshore oil and gas exploration and seafloor cable routing. More recently, multibeam echsounders are also used in the renewable energy sector such as offshore windfarms.

Multibeam has allowed oceanographers to work much faster in mapping the seafloor, we've reached a total mapping of 26.1% of the sea floor. This increase in speed has led to a much greater understanding of a wide variety of subjects, mainly climate science and marine biology, also leading to the creation of the seabed 2030 initiative, which is hoping to have the entire seafloor mapped out by 2030

== Theory of operation ==
A multibeam echosounder is a device typically used by hydrographic surveyors to determine the depth of water and the nature of the seabed. Most modern systems work by transmitting a broad acoustic fan shaped pulse from a specially designed transducer across the full swathe acrosstrack with a narrow alongtrack then forming multiple receive beams (beamforming) that are much narrower in the acrosstrack (around 1 degree depending on the system). From this narrow beam, a two way travel time of the acoustic pulse is then established utilizing a bottom detection algorithm. If the speed of sound in water is known for the full water column profile, the depth and position of the return signal can be determined from the receive angle and the two-way travel time.

In order to determine the transmit and receive angle of each beam, a multibeam echosounder requires accurate measurement of the motion of the sonar relative to a cartesian coordinate system. The measured values are typically heave, pitch, roll, yaw, and heading.

To compensate for signal loss due to spreading and absorption a time-varied gain circuit is designed into the receiver.

For deep water systems, a steerable transmit beam is required to compensate for pitch. This can also be accomplished with beamforming.
