= McConnell Island =

One of the San Juan Islands, US

- Location within Washington (state)

Geography
- Location: San Juan County, Washington
- Coordinates: 48°35′47″N 123°01′21″W
- Archipelago: San Juan
- Area: 0.05 sq mi (0.13 km^{2})

Administration
- United States

McConnell Island is one of the San Juan Islands in San Juan County, Washington, United States. It is located less than 1 mile (1,600 m) from the southwest end of Orcas Island. The island was the former private reserve of Thomas Gordon Thompson. A portion of it is currently a nature preserve.

== Geography ==
The island has a land area of 12.83 ha (31.7 acres) with the southern part of the island rocky and elevated and the northern part covered by bigleaf maple and Western redcedar trees. It is the largest of the Wasp Island group, which includes Yellow Island, Reef Island, and others.

== History ==
The island was originally known as Brown Island, named by Charles Wilkes for fourteen members of his United States Exploring Expedition crew who shared the same surname. It was later acquired by Victor McConnell, its first settler, who claimed squatters' rights.

McConnell Island was purchased at the end of World War II by Thomas Gordon Thompson, a University of Washington professor and U.S. Army chemical warfare researcher who was later the namesake of the USNS Thomas Thompson and R/V Thomas Thompson. Thompson financed the purchase of the island through the sale of his valuable stamp collection and later built a home on it from native stone and driftwood. During his proprietorship of the remote island, Thompson used it to entertain friends and guests from the nearby Friday Harbor Laboratories. In one summer alone he received more than 700 visitors.

In 1997 a 9-acre (3.6 ha) portion of the island was transferred to the San Juan Preservation Trust, a private conservation organization, to be used as a nature preserve. What is known as the Thompson Preserve includes 985 feet (300 m) of protected shoreline as well as the original Thomas Thompson home. The rest of the island remains under private ownership.
