= USNS Thomas Washington =

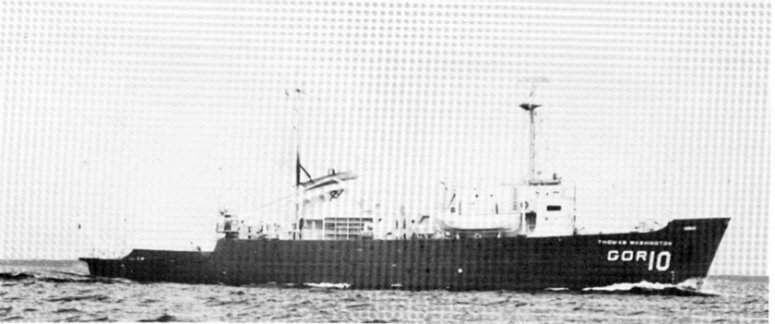

History

United States
- Name: Thomas Washington
- Namesake: Admiral Thomas Washington
- Owner: United States Navy
- Operator: Scripps Institute of Oceanography
- Builder: Marinette Marine Corp., Marinette, Wisconsin
- Laid down: 12 September 1963
- Launched: 1 August 1964
- Sponsored by: Misses Barbara E. and Ann H. Washington, granddaughters of Admiral Washington
- Acquired: 17 September 1965
- In service: Assigned to and operated by the Scripps Institute of Oceanography.
- Stricken: 1 August 1992
- Fate: Transferred to Chile 22 September 1992 and renamed Vidal Gormaz (AGOR 60).
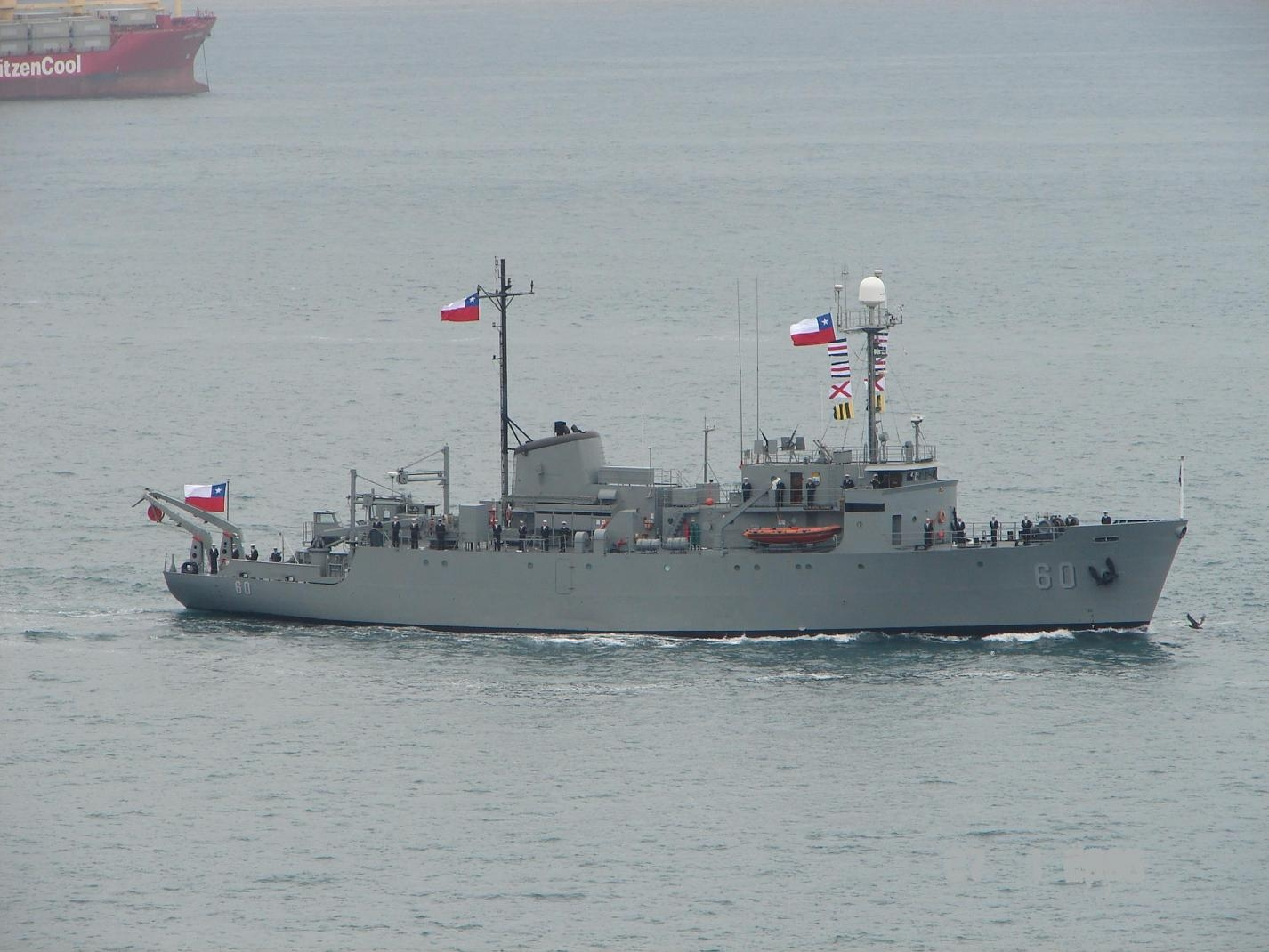
- Vidal Gormaz (AGOR 60)

History

Chile
- Name: Vidal Gormaz (AGOR-60)
- Namesake: Commodore Francisco Vidal Gormaz (1837 - 1907)
- Commissioned: 28 September 1992
- Decommissioned: 30 August 2010
- Identification: IMO number: 7742164
- Fate: Scrapped in Puerto Montt Bay, Chile 2012.

General characteristics
- Type: Robert D. Conrad-class oceanographic research ship
- Tonnage: 1,151 GRT
- Displacement: 1,490
- Length: 209 ft (63.7 m)
- Beam: 39.5 ft (12.0 m)
- Draft: 16.7 ft (5.1 m)
- Propulsion: Diesel-electric, single propeller, 2,500shp, retractable, trainable, 360 degree bow thruster
- Speed: 10 kn (12 mph; 19 km/h) cruise, 11.5 kn (13.2 mph; 21.3 km/h) maximum
- Range: 8,200 nmi (9,400 mi; 15,200 km) at cruising speed
- Complement: 22 scientific complement
- Crew: 8 officers, 15 men

Thomas Washington (T-AGOR-10) was a Robert D. Conrad-class oceanographic research ship delivered to the U.S. Navy in 1965. The ship was owned by the Navy but assigned to the Scripps Institute of Oceanography, University of California, La Jolla, California and operated as R/VThomas Washington from delivery to inactivation. (Note: The ship was part of the national academic research fleet and unlike the Navy operated ships of the type was not commonly referred to as a U.S. Naval Ship (USNS).)

In September 1992 the ship was sold to Chile and operated by the Chilean Navy as Vidal Gormaz until decommissioned in August 2010 and broken up in 2012.

== Construction ==
Thomas Washington was laid down on 12 September 1963 at Marinette, Wisconsin, by the Marinette Marine Corp.; launched on 1 August 1964; sponsored jointly by Misses Barbara E. and Ann H. Washington, granddaughters of Admiral Thomas Washington; and delivered to the Navy on 17 September 1965.

The ship was 209 ft (63.7 m) length overall, 39.5 ft (12.0 m) beam, 16.7 ft (5.1 m) draft, 1,151 GRT with a displacement tonnage of 1,490. The diesel-electric engine drove a single propeller for a cruising speed of 10 kn (12 mph; 19 km/h) and a maximum speed of 11.5 kn (13.2 mph; 21.3 km/h). With a capacity of 66,000 US gallons (250,000 L) of diesel oil the ship had a range of 8,200 nmi (9,400 mi; 15,200 km) at cruising speed. In addition to the main engine the ship had a retractable, trainable, 360 degree bow thruster. The ship was operated with eight officers and fifteen crew with a scientific complement of twenty-two.

In addition to a wet laboratory and a dry laboratory the ship had the capability to accommodate two 8 ft (2.4 m) by 8 ft (2.4 m) by 20 ft (6.1 m) vans on deck for extra berthing or instruments. For equipment handling and operation there was an "A" frame of 10,000 pounds (4,500 kg) capacity, crane with 16,000 pounds (7,300 kg) capacity and three oceanographic/hydrographic winches.

In 1967 an IBM 1800 computer, the first of its kind installed in a research vessel, for data acquisition and control was installed allowing data processing at sea rather than after operations with land-based computers. By retirement Thomas Washington had been equipped with a Furuno shallow water sounding system and for deep sounding both EDO narrow beam and a SeaBeam swath system. The ship had a capability for seismic profiling.

== Operation ==
The ship was assigned to the Scripps Institute of Oceanography, of the University of California as one of three such ships operated by academic institutions as parts of the national academic research fleet; the others being R/V Robert D. Conrad operated by the Lamont–Doherty Earth Observatory of Columbia University and R/V Thomas G. Thompson operated by the University of Washington. The Navy owned ships operated under the general control of the Oceanographer of the Navy, but were managed by the institutions, with civilian crews, conducting research experiments in support of the national oceanographic programs of the United States.

The ship's operation schedule for 1991, its last full operation year, shows the ship operated for a variety of purposes with numerous sponsors.

== Inactivation ==
Thomas Washington, reaching the 1992 end of life projection, was inactivated and struck by the Navy 1 August 1992.

== Chilean service ==
The ship was sold to Chile for operation by the Chilean Navy, renamed Vidal Gormaz for the founder of the Chilean Hydrographic Office, Commodore Francisco Vidal Gormaz (1837 - 1907), and commissioned at San Diego, California on 28 September 1992. Vidal Gormaz arrived at Valparaíso on 3 December 1992. The vessel participated in such research operations as Tropical Ocean Global Atmosphere, World Ocean Circulation Experiment, El Niño–Southern Oscillation and national Marine Scientific Research Voyages in National Fiords and Oceanic Islands and other Chilean scientific data collection.

The ship, designated AGOR-60, was decommissioned by the Chilean Navy on 30 August 2010. She was broken up at Chinquique, Puerto Montt in 2012.
