= Captain Robert Dexter Conrad Award =

Naval research and development award

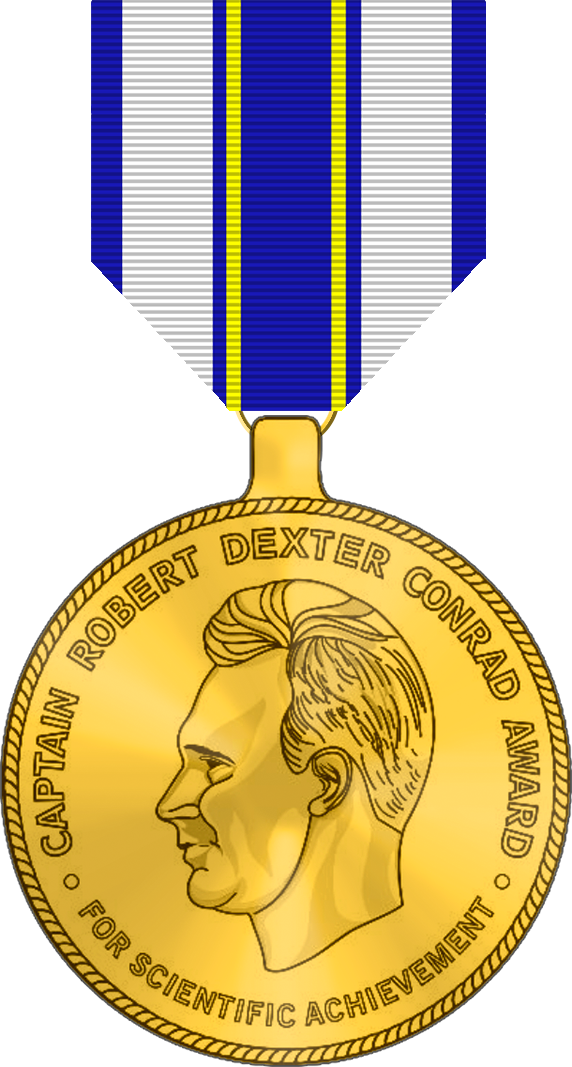
- Awarded for: Naval Research
- Sponsored by: Department of the Navy; Office of Naval Research
- Ribbon

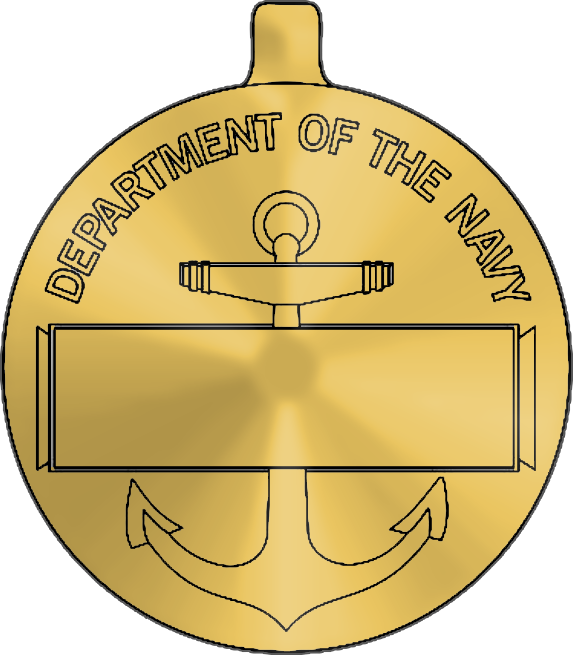
- Reverse
- Established: 1957

The Captain Robert Dexter Conrad Award is an award presented annually to the individual making an outstanding contribution in naval research and development.

== Background ==
The award is named in honor of Captain Robert Dexter Conrad, who was the primary architect of the Navy's basic research program, and the head of the Planning Division of the Office of Naval Research at the time of its establishment. It is designed to recognize and to reward outstanding technical and scientific achievement in research and development for the Department of the Navy (DON).

== Description ==
The Captain Robert Dexter Conrad award consists of a gold medal and a citation signed by the Secretary of the Navy.

== Criteria ==
The Captain Robert Dexter Conrad award will be granted, on an annual basis, to an individual who has made an outstanding contribution in the field of research and development for the DON. Such contribution shall be so outstanding as to be widely recognized, not only by the cognizant personnel within the DON, but also by the civilian scientific and engineering community of the Nation. While no time limitation is intended to be imposed in selecting a candidate for the award, it is recommended that only accomplishments of recent years be considered. Award considerations will be given to achievements in any of the following:

- Planning and administration of scientific research and development.
- Individual achievement or series of achievements which contribute to the progress of science or technology in fields of significance to the Department of the Navy.

== Eligibility ==
At the time of the achievement or contribution cited as a basis for the award, nominees must have been in one of the following categories:

- a civilian employee in an active employment status in the Department of Navy
- an employee of a Department of Navy contractor
- a member of the military service on active duty.

== Nominating responsibilities ==
The Chief of Naval Research (CNR) is responsible for obtaining and forwarding, with comments, a nomination to the Secretary of the Navy via the Assistant Secretary of the Navy (Research, Engineering and System) annually.

If none of the nominees submitted in a given year meet the established standards, the CNR will recommend to the Secretary that no award be granted for that year. To avoid possible embarrassment, nominations should be designated “FOR OFFICIAL USE ONLY” and safeguarded until final action has been taken.

== Nomination procedure ==
The Chief of Naval Research will establish a Nomination Review Committee. The committee will consist of nine representatives from Navy activities, which have significant research and development programs. The committee will be responsible for ensuring that the widest possible consideration of potential nominees and for making an appropriate recommendation to the CNR.

Award nominations should be in the correct format and be favorably endorsed by the headquarters command. The CNR will issue a notice concerning the nomination due date and general information on the Committee meeting. Prior to this meeting, Committee members will receive a copy of each nomination to be considered.

When the Committee meets, each representative should be prepared to provide supporting information on the potential candidate(s) submitted by his or her organization. After each nomination has been discussed, ballots will be completed and a recommendation will be formulated and forwarded to the CNR.

== Award presentation ==
Awards approved by the Secretary of the Navy will be presented by the CNR or the CNR's designated representative at a special ceremony which is mutually convenient to the recipient, his or her employing organization, and the CNR.

== Recipients ==
List of recipients and year supplied by the Office of Naval Research; affiliation gleaned from a web search.

1. 1957 Alan Tower Waterman, Office of Naval Research
2. 1958 Charles Lauritsen, California Institute of Technology
3. 1959 Robert M. Page, Naval Research Laboratory
4. 1960 Ralph Edward Gibson, Johns Hopkins University Applied Physics Laboratory
5. 1961 Howard T. Karsner, Bureau of Medicine and Surgery
6. 1962 John T. Hayward, United States Navy
7. 1963 Gerald M. Clemence, Naval Observatory
8. 1964 Herbert Friedman, Naval Research Laboratory
9. 1965 Ashton Graybiel, Navy School of Aviation Medicine Pensacola
10. 1966 Levering Smith, United States Navy
11. 1967 William Markowitz, Marquette University
12. 1968 William A. Zisman, Naval Research Laboratory
13. 1969 George R. Irwin, Naval Research Laboratory
14. 1970 Haskell G. Wilson, Naval Weapons Center China Lake
15. 1971 Harry Hoogstraal, Naval Medical Research Unit No 3 Cairo Egypt
16. 1972 Howard O. Lorenzen, Naval Research Laboratory
17. 1973 William S. Pellini, Naval Research Laboratory
18. 1974 Fred N. Spiess, Scripps Institution of Oceanography
19. 1975 John A. Pierce, Harvard University
20. 1976 Jerome Karle, Naval Research Laboratory
21. 1977 Charles E. Brodine, Navy Medical Research and Development Command
22. 1978 Walter H. Munk, Scripps Institution of Oceanography
23. 1979 Harold E. Bennett, Naval Weapons Center China Lake
24. 1980 Isabella L. Karle, Naval Research Laboratory
25. 1981 Victor L. Granatstein, Naval Research Laboratory
26. 1982 Alan Berman, Naval Research Laboratory
27. 1983 Alan Powell, Naval Surface Warfare Center Carderock
28. 1984 Thomas G. Giallorenzi, Naval Research Laboratory
29. 1985 Larry J. Argiro, Naval Surface Warfare Center Annapolis
30. 1986 Peter G. Wilhelm, Naval Research Laboratory
31. 1987 C. Robert Valeri, Navy Blood Research Laboratory Plymouth
32. 1988 Fred E. Saalfeld, Naval Research Laboratory and Office of Naval Research
33. 1989 Jay Paul Boris, Naval Research Laboratory
34. 1990 Homer W. Carhart, Naval Research Laboratory
35. 1991 Robert D. Ballard, Woods Hole Oceanographic Institute
36. 1992 William B. Morgan, Naval Surface Warfare Center Carderock
37. 1993 Carver A. Mead, California Institute of Technology
38. 1994 Carl O. Bostrom, Johns Hopkins University Applied Physics Laboratory
39. 1995 Maurice M. Sevik, Naval Surface Warfare Center Carderock
40. 1996 Carl H. June, Uniformed Services University of Health Sciences Bethesda
41. 1997 Norman L. Owsley, Naval Undersea Warfare Center Newport
42. 1998 Stephen L. Hoffman, Navy Medical Research Center Forest Glen
43. 1998 Ming Chiang Lin, Naval Research Laboratory
44. 1999 Timothy P. Coffey, Naval Research Laboratory
45. 2005 Rolf G. Kasper, Naval Undersea Warfare Center Newport
46. 2007 Baruch Levush, Naval Research Laboratory
47. 2008 Josko Catipovic, Naval Undersea Warfare Center Newport
48. 2009 Robert M. Koch, Naval Undersea Warfare Center Newport
49. 2010 Ted R. Clem, Naval Surface Warfare Center Panama City
50. 2011 Keith Lucas, Naval Research Laboratory
51. 2012 Kazhikathra Kailasanath, Naval Research Laboratory
52. 2014 Wallace Arden Smith, Office of Naval Research
53. 2015 Jerry Meyer, Naval Research Laboratory
54. 2016 Thomas L. Reinecke, Naval Research Laboratory
