= RV Atlantis (AGOR-25) =

American oceanographic research ship

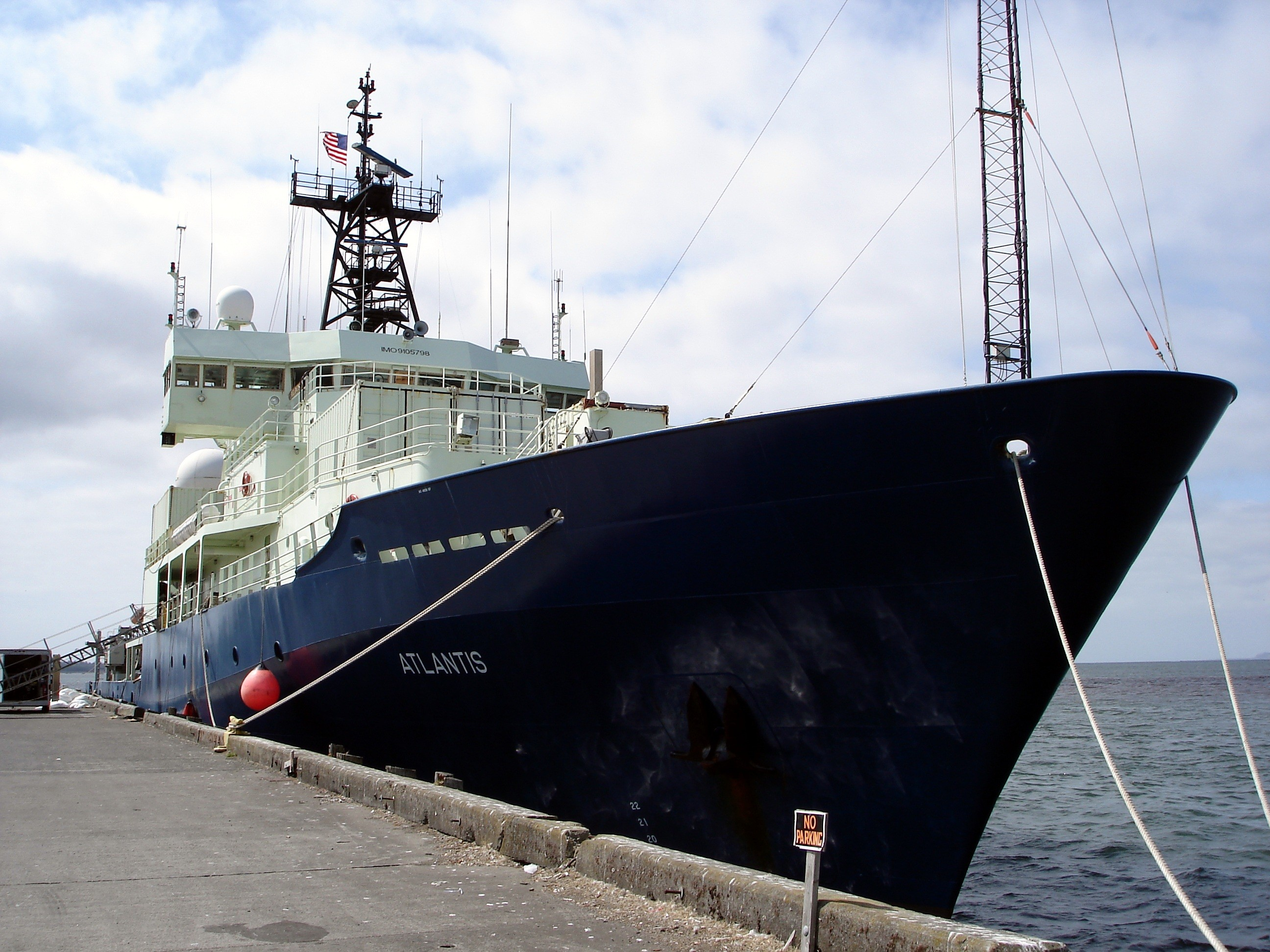

History

United States
- Name: Atlantis
- Owner: Leased to Woods Hole Oceanographic Institution
- Builder: Halter Marine Inc., Gulfport, Mississippi
- Laid down: 16 August 1994
- Launched: 1 February 1996
- Acquired: By the U.S. Navy, 25 February 1998, as RV Atlantis (AGOR-25)
- In service: February 1998 by Woods Hole Oceanographic Institution under charter for the Office of Naval Research
- Refit: In 1997, as a support ship for the U.S. Navy Deep Submergence Vehicle Alvin
- Identification: IMO number: 9105798; MMSI number: 367241000; Callsign: KAQP
- Notes: In service

General characteristics
- Type: Thomas G. Thompson-class oceanographic research ship
- Tonnage: 3,180 gt; 1,332 dwt
- Length: 273.2 ft. 9 in. (83.2 m)
- Beam: 52.5 ft. (16 m)
- Draft: 19 feet (5.8 m)
- Installed power: Diesel generators: three 1500 kW, three 715 kW 600 VAC.
- Propulsion: Diesel-electric, azimuthing stern thrusters - 3000 HP per thruster, bow thruster: azimuthing jet 1,180 SHP
- Speed: 11 knots (20 km/h)
- Range: 17,280 NM
- Endurance: 60 days
- Boats & landing craft carried: Two rigid-hull inflatable rescue/work boats
- Capacity: Fuel capacity: 267,540 US gallons (1,012,700 L)
- Complement: 22 civilian mariners; 24 scientists; 12 Deep Submergence Operations Group (Alvin); 2 SSSG techs.
- Sensors & processing systems: As installed on Atlantis, the SeaBeam 2100/12 system consists of underhull projectors and diver-replaceable hydrophones, a single 19" electronics rack, an operator's workstation and peripherals.

RV Atlantis is a Thomas G. Thompson-class oceanographic research ship, owned by the US Navy and operated by the Woods Hole Oceanographic Institution as part of the University-National Oceanographic Laboratory System (UNOLS) fleet. She is the host vessel of DSV Alvin. She is named for the first research vessel operated by WHOI, the sailboat RV Atlantis, for which the Space Shuttle Atlantis is also named.

== Construction ==
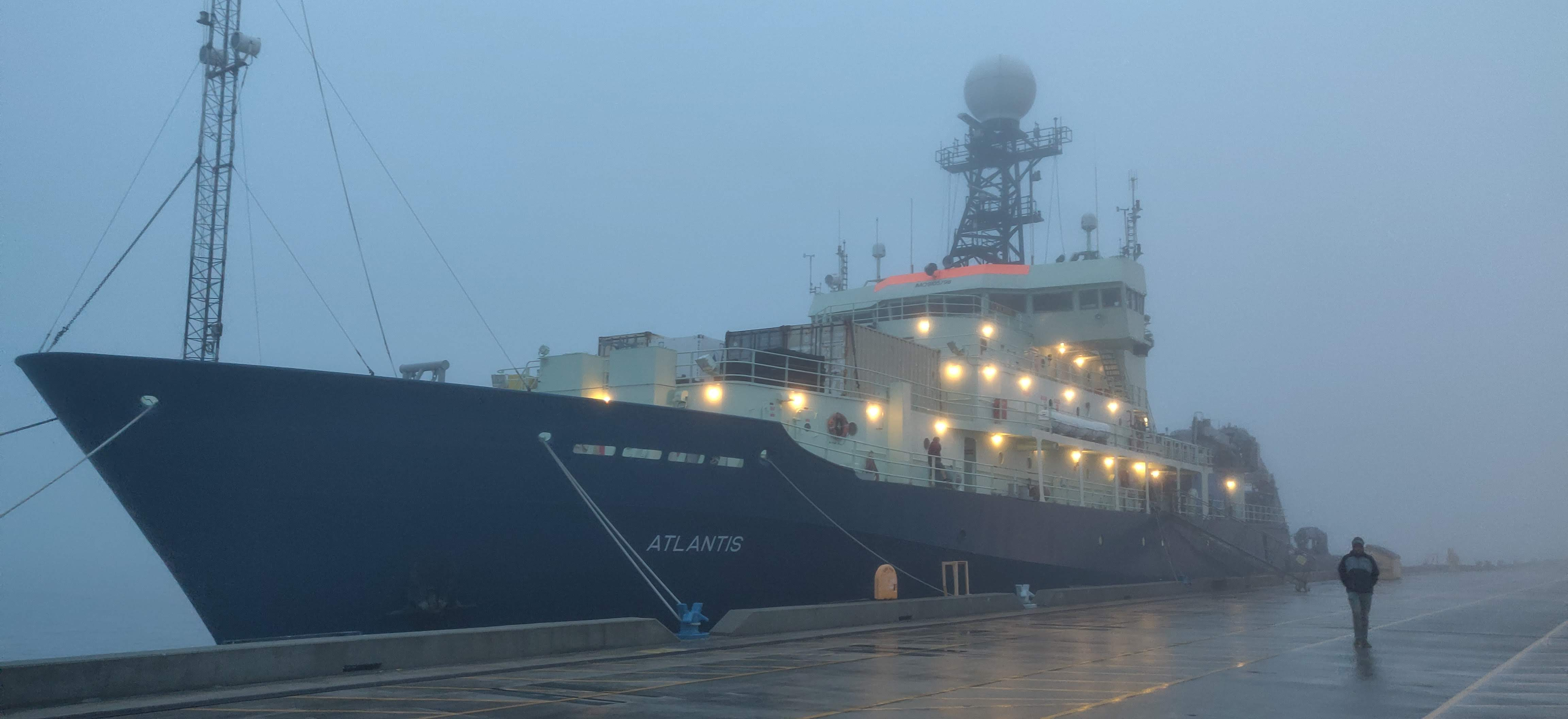
RV Atlantis docked in Gulfport, Mississippi on a foggy winter day in 2020

Atlantis was built by Halter Marine Inc., Gulfport, Mississippi. She was laid down in August 1994 and launched in February 1996. She was delivered to the U.S. Navy on 25 February 1998, as RV Atlantis (AGOR-25) a Thomas G. Thompson-class oceanographic research ship.

Atlantis completed a year-long midlife maintenance and refit at Dakota Creek Shipyard in July 2021.

== Deck equipment ==
- Winches
  - Traction – 30,000' .68" EM or 9/16" wire
  - Hydro – 33,000' 3-cond. EM or 1/4" wire
- Heavy equipment
  - Cranes – two @ 42,000 lbs. cap
  - HIAB cranes (2)
  - Midships hydro boom

== Miscellaneous on-board equipment ==
- Laboratories: 3,517 square feet (326.7 m^{2})
- Portable Van Space: At least six 20 ft (6.1 m). vans
- Sewage System: Envirovac flushing system

== Sister ships ==
The Atlantis and three other research ships were all built to the same basic design. The three sister ships are RV Thomas G. Thompson (UW), RV Roger Revelle (Scripps) and NOAAS Ronald H. Brown (NOAA).

== Notable expeditions and events ==
In 2022, Atlantis was involved in the rescue of 13 people off the coast of North Carolina. The fishing vessel Tremont sent a mayday at 0200 on October 28 following the collision with the container ship MSC Rita. Atlantis as well as the motor vessel Drystan and assistance from the United States Coast Guard rescued the crew later that morning.
