= Robert Dexter Conrad =

United States Navy officer

- Born: March 20, 1905; Orange, Massachusetts, U.S.
- Died: July 26, 1949 (aged 44); New York City, New York, U.S.
- Military career
- Allegiance: United States of America
- Branch: United States Navy
- Service years: 1927–1947
- Rank: Captain
- Units: Director of the Planning Division, Office of Research and Inventions
- Awards: Legion of Merit; Navy Distinguished Service Medal

Robert Dexter Conrad (March 20, 1905 – July 26, 1949) was a United States Navy officer. He graduated from the United States Naval Academy and was commissioned as an ensign in June 1927.

== Naval career ==
Following duty onboard USS Florida (BB-30), he attended the Postgraduate School at Annapolis, Maryland, and earned a Master of Science degree in naval architecture at Massachusetts Institute of Technology in June 1932.

Then ordered to the Portsmouth Navy Yard (New Hampshire), he served there until the fall of 1933 when he took a leave of absence to study at Cambridge University, England.

Returning to the United States, he served in the Design and Construction Division and in the Research and Information Section of the Bureau of Construction and Repair; then, from August 1937 to June 1939, at the Experimental Model Basin at Washington, D.C. Duty at Mare Island followed and in November 1940 he was appointed Assistant Naval Attaché, later Special Naval Observer, at the American Embassy, London.

== World War II service ==
In January 1942 he returned to Washington, D.C. Initially in the Bureau of Ships, he became Head of the Progress and Planning Section in the Office of the Coordinator of Research and Development, Office of the Secretary of the Navy in April and remained in that post until May 1945.

He was awarded the Legion of Merit for his work during that period. After the end of the war in Europe, Captain Conrad continued his research work through many organizational changes, and was eventually designated Director of the Planning Division, Office of Research and Inventions, later the Office of Naval Research. He was awarded the Navy Distinguished Service Medal for his work both during and after the Second World War.

== Retirement ==
Captain Conrad retired in 1947 and died in New York City on July 26, 1949.

== Award named in his honor ==
The Navy's top scientific award, an annual award to the individual making an outstanding contribution in naval research and development bears Captain Conrad's name: the Captain Robert Dexter Conrad Award.

== Ship naming ==
The USNS Robert D. Conrad (T-AGOR-3), a research ship operated by Columbia University, was named in his honor.
