= RV Thomas G. Thompson =

Two ships of the United States Navy have borne the name Thomas G. Thompson, in honor of oceanographer Thomas G. Thompson (1888–1961).

- USNS Thomas G. Thompson (T-AGOR-9), was a Robert D. Conrad-class oceanographic research ship, launched in 1964, and leased to the University of Washington (UW) in 1965. Renamed and redesignated MV Pacific Escort (IX-517), and RV Gosport in 1995, the ship was struck from the Naval Vessel Register in 2004, and sunk as part of a NATO exercise.
- RV Thomas G. Thompson (T-AGOR-23), is a Thomas G. Thompson-class oceanographic research ship, launched in 1990 and leased to the University of Washington School of Oceanography in 1991.
