= USNS Robert D. Conrad =

Oceanographic research ship that served the U.S. Navy from 1962 to 1989

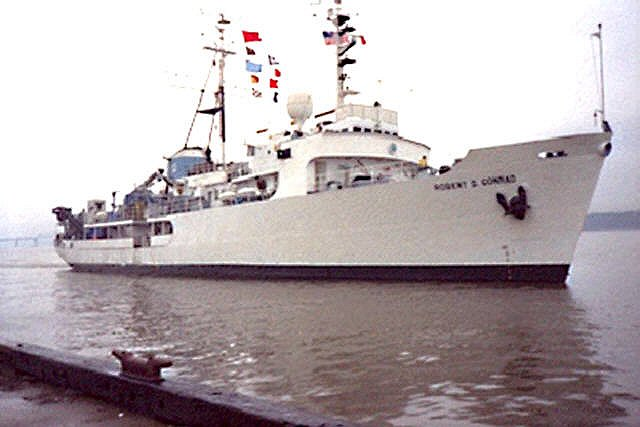

History

United States
- Name: Robert D. Conrad
- Namesake: Robert Dexter Conrad, graduate of the U.S. Naval Academy, born on 20 March 1905 in Orange, Massachusetts
- Owner: United States Navy
- Operator: Lamont–Doherty Earth Observatory, Columbia University
- Builder: Gibbs Systems Inc., Jacksonville, Florida
- Laid down: 19 January 1961
- Launched: 26 May 1962
- Sponsored by: Mrs. Edmund B. Taylor
- Acquired: 29 November 1962
- In service: 29 November 1962
- Out of service: 4 October 1989
- Stricken: 4 October 1989
- Identification: IMO number: 7742140
- Fate: Scrapped, 27 April 2004

General characteristics
- Type: Robert D. Conrad-class oceanographic research ship
- Tonnage: 1,200 tons
- Tons burthen: 1,370 tons
- Length: 209 ft (64 m)
- Beam: 40 ft (12 m)
- Draft: 16 ft (4.9 m)
- Propulsion: diesel-electric, single propeller, 2,500shp, retractable azimuth-correcting bow thruster
- Speed: 12 knots
- Complement: 23 civilian mariners, 38 scientists
- Armament: none

Robert D. Conrad (T-AGOR-3) was a Robert D. Conrad-class oceanographic research ship that operated from 1962 to 1989. The ship, while Navy owned, was operated as the R/V Robert D. Conrad by the Lamont–Doherty Earth Observatory of Columbia University from delivery to inactivation. (Note: The ship was part of the national academic research fleet and unlike the Navy operated ships of the type was not commonly referred to as a U.S. Naval Ship (USNS).) The ship provided valuable ocean-bottom, particularly seismic profile, information and underwater test data to the U.S. Navy and other U.S. agencies.

== Construction ==
Robert D. Conrad (AGOR-3) was laid down in January 1961 by Gibbs Shipyards, Inc., Jacksonville, Florida; launched on 26 May 1962; sponsored by Mrs. Edmund B. Taylor; and completed and delivered to the Navy in November 1962.

== Assigned to Columbia University ==
After delivery, the single screw, diesel-electric, oceanographic research ship, Robert D. Conrad, was assigned to the then Lamont Geological Observatory, Columbia University, for operation. The ship was one of three such ships operated by academic institutions as parts of the national academic research fleet; the others being R/V Thomas G. Thompson and R/V Thomas Washington. Complete with wet and dry laboratories, scientific and chart room, photo laboratory, scientific drafting room, a machine shop, two 24" diameter tubes along the centerline for lowering instruments, and a retractable propeller in the bow to maintain position while working with equipment over the side, Robert D. Conrad worked for the Observatory (renamed the Lamont–Doherty Earth Observatory in 1993) for her entire career.

Much of her work has been in cooperation with the Office of Naval Research. The ship collected gravity and magnetics data on the seafloor; created seismic images of rock layers below the ocean floor; dredged rock samples; took ocean-floor sediment cores (creating what is now a collection of over 13,000 cores); mapped the ocean floor with sonar; and collected water samples to explore ocean currents, temperature, salinity, marine life and other data for a wide range of oceanographic research. During the spring and summer of 1963 the ship worked with Submarine Development Group 2 as that group searched the ocean floor for traces of the submarine Thresher. In 1974 the ship was equipped with four airguns and a 2,400 m (7,900 ft) 24-channel hydrophone array for multichannel seismic surveying with upgrades to ten airguns and a 4,000 m (13,000 ft), 160-channel hydrophone array by retirement in 1989 at which time the ship had logged over one million nautical research miles.

A primary mission of the ship was collection of seismic profiles showing geological features below the ocean floor sediments as part of the laboratory's Marine Geology and Geophysics program initiated by Maurice Ewing with the R/V Vema in 1949. The data supported the early definition of seafloor spreading with Robert D. Conrad becoming the second ship, after Vema, to collect over one million nautical miles of oceanographic research.

== Inactivation ==
Robert D. Conrad went out of service and was struck from the Navy List on 4 October 1989. The ship was laid up in the National Defense Reserve Fleet, James River on 26 July 1989. The ship was scrapped 27 April 2004.
