= Thomas Thomson =

Thomas Thomson may refer to:

- Tom Thomson (1877–1917), Canadian painter
- Thomas Thomson (apothecary) (died 1572), Scottish apothecary
- Thomas Thomson (advocate) (1768–1852), Scottish lawyer
- Thomas Thomson (botanist) (1817–1878), Scottish botanist
- Thomas Thomson (chemist) (1773–1852), Scottish chemist
- Thomas Inkerman Thomson (1855–1919), hardware merchant and political figure in Ontario, Canada
- Thomas Napier Thomson (1798–1869), Scottish minister and writer
- T. R. H. Thomson (Thomas Richard Heywood Thomson), English explorer and naturalist.

== See also ==
- Tom Thomson (judoka) (born 1947), Canadian judoka and head coach of the Canadian Paralympic judo team
- Tom Thomson (Canadian football), Canadian football player
- Earl Thomson (1895–1971), Canadian-American Olympic champion hurdler, known as Tommy Thomson
- Thomas Thompson (disambiguation)
