= NOAAS Ronald H. Brown =

U.S. NOAA research ship

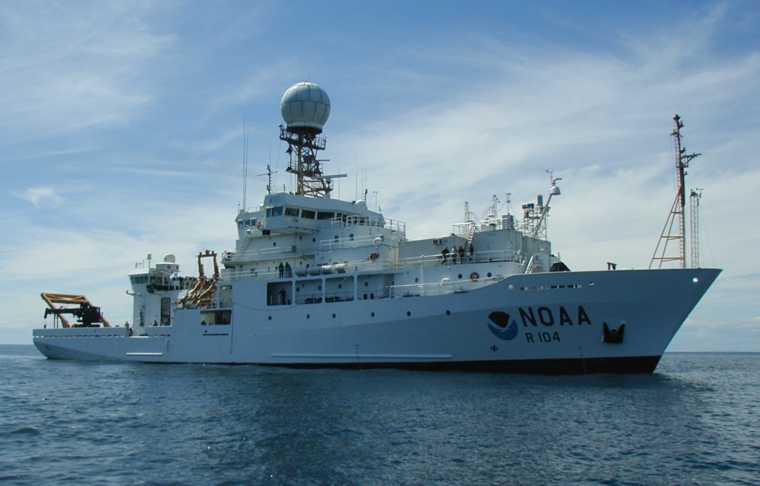

History

United States
- Name: Ronald H. Brown
- Namesake: Ronald H. Brown (1941–1996), U.S. Secretary of Commerce (1993–1996)
- Operator: NOAA
- Builder: Halter Marine, Pascagoula
- Laid down: February 1995
- Launched: May 30, 1996
- Completed: April 25, 1997
- Home port: Charleston, South Carolina
- Identification: IMO number: 9105786; MMSI number: 368996000; Callsign: WTEC
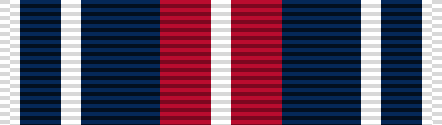
- Honors and awards: Department of Commerce Gold Medal
- Status: Active NOAA fleet

General characteristics
- Tonnage: 3,180 GT; 1,332 DWT
- Displacement: 3,250 tons
- Length: 274 ft (84 m)
- Beam: 52.5 ft (16.0 m)
- Draft: 17.0 ft (5.2 m)
- Propulsion: 3 × 1,500 kW diesel generators; 2 × 3,000 hp (2,200 kW) z-drive; 1,180 hp bow thruster
- Speed: 15 knots (28 km/h; 17 mph) max
- Capacity: 32 passengers
- Crew: 6 officers + 20 crew

NOAAS Ronald H. Brown (R 104) is a Thomas G. Thompson-class blue-water research vessel of the U.S. National Oceanic and Atmospheric Administration. She is NOAA's only Global-Class research ship.

The ship is named for United States Secretary of Commerce Ron Brown, who was killed while in office in a plane crash on 3 April 1996 while on a trade mission to Bosnia and Herzegovina.

== Construction and commissioning ==
Ronald H. Brown's keel was laid at VT Halter Marine's Moss Point shipyard in Pascagoula, Mississippi, in February 1995, and she was launched on 30 May 1996. NOAA commissioned her on 19 July 1997 at her home port, Charleston, South Carolina. She was NOAA's first newly built oceanographic research vessel in 17 years.

== Technical characteristics ==
At 274 feet (84 m) in length, Ronald H. Brown is the largest vessel in the NOAA fleet. Her hull is hardened against ice to allow for Arctic and Antarctic research. The ship has a total of 59 bunk spaces and can seat 30 at a time in her mess room. The ship also includes a two-bed hospital facility. She carries a complement of six NOAA Corps commissioned officers, one commissioned U.S. Public Health Service medical officer, 22 crew and a maximum of 31 scientists.

The deck equipment features three winches, two fixed cranes, a portable crane, a hydrographic boom, and an A-frame. This equipment gives Ronald H. Brown a lifting capacity of up to 42,000 pounds (19,000 kg) as well as up to 10,000 metres (33,000 ft) of cable that can pull up to 8,100 pounds (3,700 kg). One of the winches is specifically for use with specialty cables such as optical fiber cables or coaxial EM Cable.

As a research vessel, a substantial amount of the ship is dedicated to laboratories. Included in the 4,100 square feet (380 m^{2}) of laboratory space are a computer/electronics laboratory, a biochemical laboratory, and a wet laboratory.

In addition to her state-of-the-art oceanographic sampling capabilities, the Ronald H. Brown has instrumentation to study the atmosphere, including a Doppler weather radar for a better understanding of storm dynamics at sea. This combined atmospheric and oceanographic sampling capability makes the ship unique in the world's research fleet. Scientists aboard the vessel can study critical environmental issues across the world's oceans.

Ronald H. Brown and three other research ships were all built to the same basic design. Her three sister ships, all owned by the US Navy, are RV Thomas G. Thompson, operated by the University of Washington, RV Roger Revelle, operated by the Scripps Institute of Oceanography, and RV Atlantis, operated by the Woods Hole Oceanographic Institution.

=== Operational history ===
Ronald H. Brown has participated in many national and international projects.

On 18 July 2013, Ronald H. Brown departed Charleston; by the time she returned on 25 March 2017, she had spent 1,347 days deployed, the longest deployment by a NOAA ship in history. During her deployment, she spent almost 800 days at sea and traveled 130,000 nautical miles (240,000 km; 150,000 mi), conducting scientific research and servicing more than 80 buoys that collect environmental data on ocean and weather conditions in the tropical ocean. Her scientific activities included the study of ocean acidification and of atmospheric rivers over the Pacific Ocean off the United States West Coast; participation in a first-of-its-kind multi-agency rapid response mission to observe the El Niño of 2015–2016; the taking of more than 1,600 water measurements in the Atlantic Ocean between Iceland and Antarctica and in the Pacific Ocean between Alaska and Antarctica in support of efforts to improve the understanding of the long-term physical properties of the ocean and how they are changing; bathymetric surveys of 353,975 square miles (916,792 square kilometers) of the ocean bottom to map the U.S. Extended Continental Shelf, including surveys conducted near Kingman Reef and Palmyra Atoll in the Pacific Ocean; assessments of the ecology of bays along the Alaska North Slope; and studies of the fisheries and oceanography of the Arctic Ocean off the coast of Alaska.

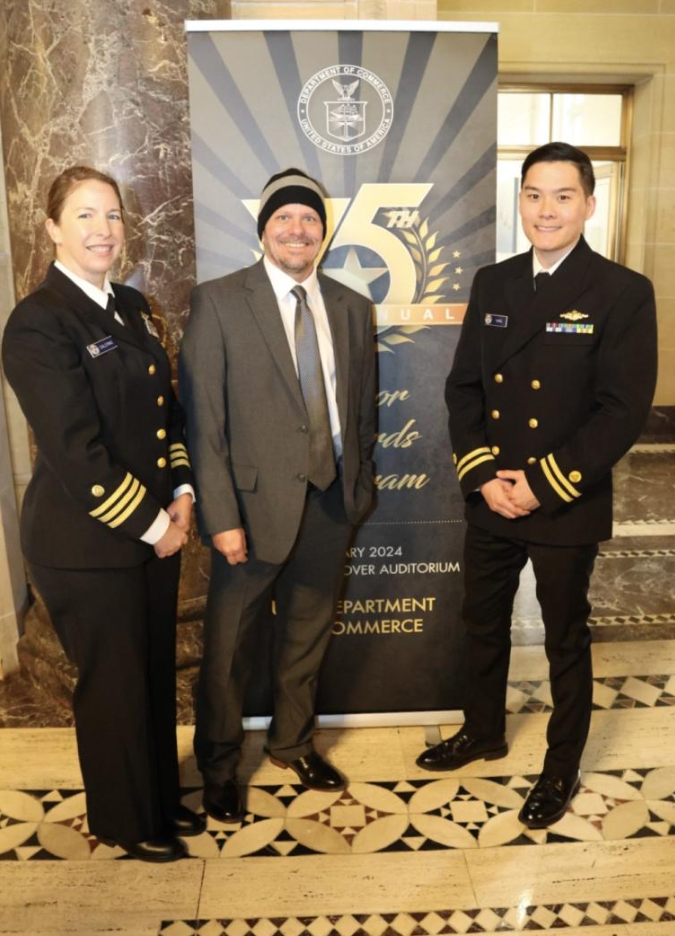
Crew members of Ronald H. Brown, NOAAS Oregon II (R 332), and NOAAS Thomas Jefferson (S 222) at a ceremony on 6 February 2024 at United States Department of Commerce headquarters in Washington, D.C., to accept the Department of Commerce Gold Medal on behalf of their ships for lifesaving achievements.

Ronald H. Brown was on a 40-day mission to service meteorological buoys in the Atlantic Ocean when she came to the assistance of a disabled sailing vessel several hundred miles off Cape Verde on 28 November 2022. After transiting 200 nautical miles (370 km; 230 mi) to reach the sailboat, Ronald H. Brown used a small boat in rough seas to bring aboard three people from the sailboat, one of whom had been injured by a falling mast. Other people aboard the sailboat decided not to evacuate, so Ronald H. Brown′s provided them with fuel so they could reach port using the sailboat's motor. The three people who came aboard Ronald H. Brown remained aboard her for several days until she reached Newport, Rhode Island. For their role in assisting the disabled sailing vessel, Ronald H. Brown and her crew received the Department of Commerce Gold Medal in a ceremony at United States Department of Commerce headquarters in Washington, D.C., on 6 February 2024.

== Honors and awards ==
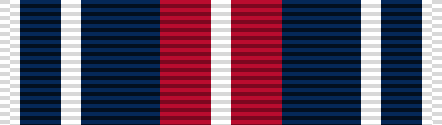
- Department of Commerce Gold Medal

== See also ==
- NOAA ships and aircraft
