= Jay P. Boris =

American physicist

Jay Paul Boris is an American physicist and chief scientist at the Naval Research Laboratory.

Boris was elected a fellow of the American Physical Society in 1976. In 2009, he was elected a member of the National Academy of Engineering.
