= USNS Thomas G. Thompson (T-AGOR-9) =

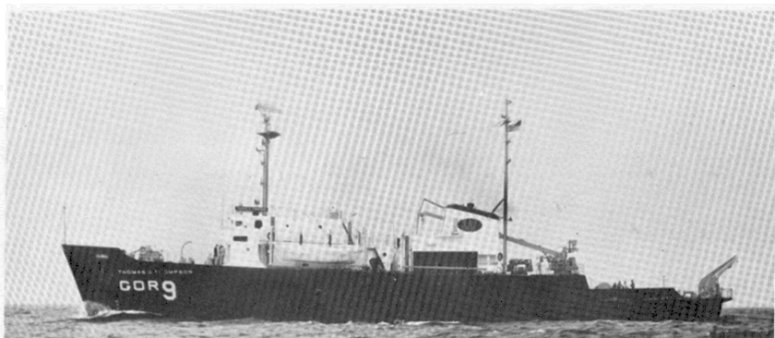

History

United States
- Name: Thomas G. Thompson
- Namesake: Thomas Gordon Thompson
- Builder: Marinette Marine, Marinette, Wisconsin
- Laid down: 12 September 1963
- Launched: 18 July 1964
- Sponsored by: Mrs. Isabel Thompson, the widow of Professor Thompson
- Acquired: By the Navy, 1 August 1965, as R/V Thomas G. Thompson (AGOR-9)
- In service: On lease to the University of Washington, 21 September 1965
- Out of service: date not known
- Renamed: R/V Gosport (IX-517), 7 May 1997, a multi-purpose research vessel
- Reclassified: Unclassified Miscellaneous, 11 December 1989; R/V Pacific Escort (II) (IX-517) a general research (date unknown);
- Stricken: 27 February 2004
- Identification: IMO number: 7742152
- Fate: Sunk, 14 November 2004 as part of a NATO exercise

General characteristics
- Type: Robert D. Conrad-class oceanographic research ship
- Displacement: 1,200 tons light, 1,370 tons full load
- Length: 209 ft (64 m)
- Beam: 40 ft (12 m)
- Draft: 16 ft (4.9 m)
- Propulsion: diesel-electric, three propeller shafts, (low speed diesel engine driving cycloidal propellers, fwd & aft), 2,500shp
- Speed: 12 knots
- Complement: 14 civilian mariners; up to 30 scientific party
- Armament: none

Thomas G. Thompson (T-AGOR-9) was a Robert D. Conrad-class oceanographic research ship acquired by the U.S. Navy in 1965. The ship was transferred to the University of Washington for operation as part of the University-National Oceanographic Laboratory System (UNOLS) fleet on 21 September 1965. In 1988 the ship went out of UNOLS service. The ship, retaining the previous name, was designated by the Navy as IX-517 assigned to the Mare Island Naval Shipyard for general naval research. Thomas G. Thompson was later renamed Pacific Escort II with the same designation. On 7 May 1997 the Navy renamed the ship Gosport and transferred the ship to the Norfolk Naval Shipyard available for hire as a multi purpose platform from the shipyard. The ship, placed out of service and struck from the register on 27 February 2004, was sunk as part of a NATO exercise 14 November 2004.

== Construction ==
Thomas G. Thompson (AGOR-9), specially designed for oceanographic research work, was laid down on 12 September 1963 at Marinette, Wisconsin, by the Marinette Marine Corp.; launched on 18 July 1964; sponsored by Mrs. Isabel Thompson, the widow of Professor Thompson; and delivered to the Navy on 4 September 1965.

== University of Washington service ==
From the ceremonial transfer to the University of Washington at the Boston Naval Shipyard on 21 September 1965 until 1988 the ship was assigned to the university as part of the University-National Oceanographic Laboratory System (UNOLS) fleet of Navy owned ships. Thomas G. Thompson was one of three such ships operated by academic institutions as parts of the academic fleet; the others being R/V obert D. Conrad operated by the Lamont–Doherty Earth Observatory of Columbia University and R/V Thomas Washington operated by the Scripps Institution of Oceanography. The Navy owned ships operated under the general control of the Oceanographer of the Navy, but were managed by the institutions, with civilian crews, conducting research experiments in support of the national oceanographic programs of the United States.

On 5 June 1987 the Office of Naval Research (ONR) solicited bids from UNOLS institutions for operation of a new, more capable, class of research vessels. The initial vessel to be designated AGOR-23 was to "replace at least one existing AGOR 3 class ship in the Navy portion of the UNOLS academic fleet" with a part of the requirement being "a practical plan for return to the Navy of at least one AGOR 3 Class ship now chartered from ONR must be included in the proposal." Operator representatives observed that only three such ships existed at three institutions thus seemingly limiting bidding to those institutions. The University of Washington's bid resulted in the old Thomas Washington being returned to the Navy in 1991 to be replaced by the new AGOR-23 to also be named Thomas G. Thompson operated by the university on 8 July 1991.

== Naval designations and further use ==
After retirement from the UNOLS service with the University of Washington the ship was placed in service at the Mare Island Naval Shipyard under the designation (IX-517) available for general research. The ship was renamed Pacific Escort II in 1990. Renamed Gosport and transferred to the Atlantic and the Norfolk Naval Shipyard the ship operated as a multi-purpose research ship available for hire from the shipyard. Gosport was retired, struck from the register 27 February 2004, and sunk in a NATO exercise on 14 November 2004.
