= William Zisman =

American chemist and geophysicist

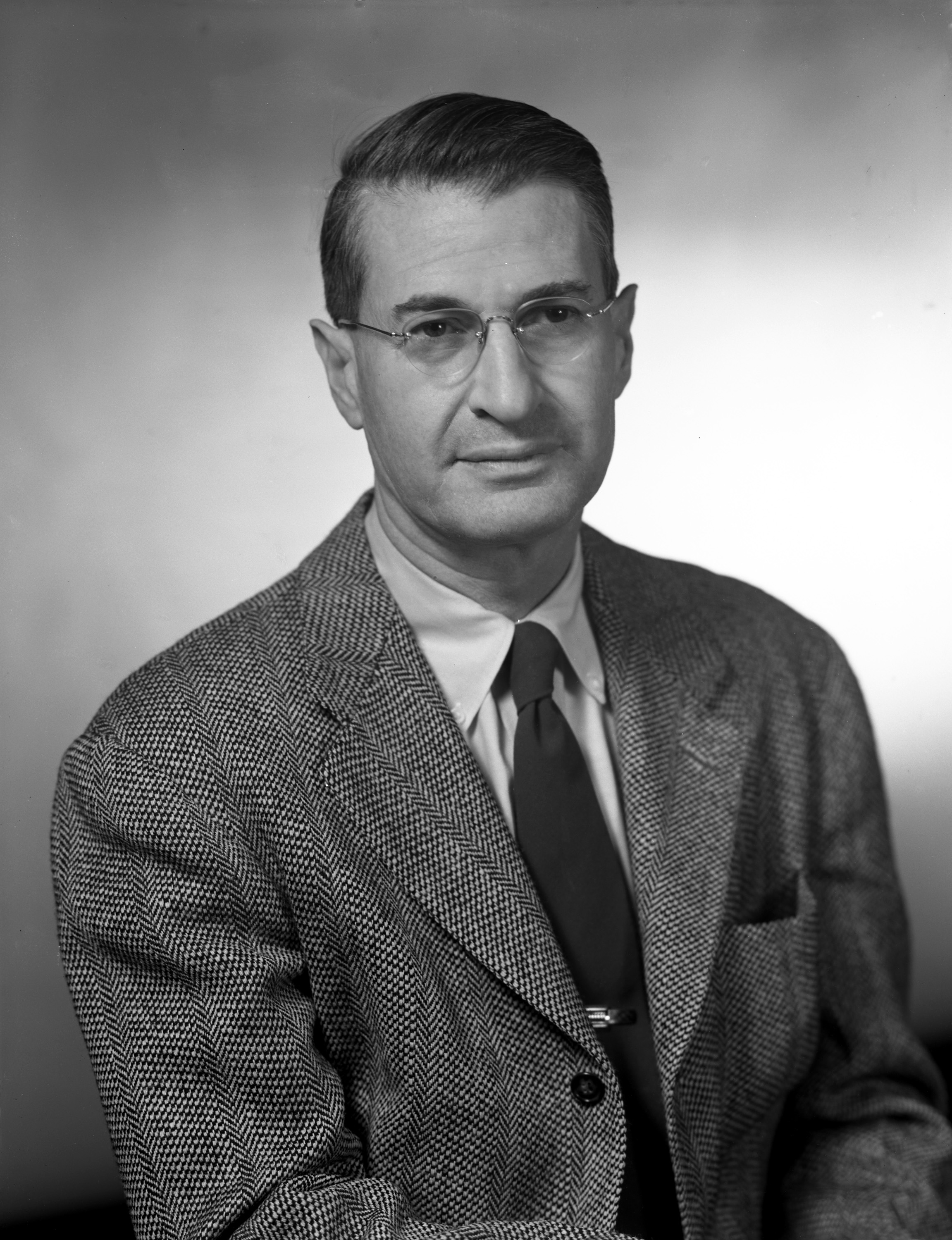
William Zisman

Dr. William Albert Zisman (1905–1986) was an American chemist and geophysicist.

== Life and career ==
He was born in Albany, New York, and spent his youth in Providence, Rhode Island, up to the age of 14 when his family moved to Washington, D.C. He earned his BS and MS degrees in physics from Massachusetts Institute of Technology. He began his career working as a research assistant to Nobel Prize winner P. W. Bridgman at Harvard University. He earned his PhD while at Harvard in 1932 and continued on as a post-doc studying high pressure problems relating to the Earth's core. During this point in his career he began to follow in the footsteps of Langmuir, Rideal, and Harkins. Research funds were limited during the Great Depression and so Zisman returned to Washington, D.C., and held various administrative jobs for government agencies that were born during the New Deal era.

Zisman returned to science in 1938 when he quit his job in Washington for a year and personally financed a year of study in the laboratory of the late Dr. Roy Goranson at the Carnegie Geophysical Laboratory. The following year he successfully lobbied for a research program in surface chemistry and was hired to steer that program at the Naval Research Lab, later heading up the entire Chemistry Division. "Surface Chemistry was his abiding interest and everyone in the division was trained to be aware of the various interactions that can be involved in diverse natural systems." said Patrick J. Hannan, who worked under Zisman in the Chemistry Division.

While at NRL, Zisman developed the vibrating condenser method of measuring contact potential, a method that has been widely used since then. In fact, he did his master's thesis on this topic at MIT. He also did significant work on oils and during the war he made many important observations that led to the development of synthetic lubricants and additives. Perhaps no one of his era made greater contributions to the vast collection of excellent data on contact angle, wettability, surface tension, and adhesion. In 1954 he was awarded the Navy Distinguished Civilian Service Award. In 1961, Zisman received the International Award from the Society of Tribologists and Lubrication Engineers. In 1963, he received the Kendall Award from the American Chemical Society for his vast contributions to surface science. In 1964 he was awarded the Department of Defense Distinguished Civilian Service Award from the Secretary of Defense. In 1965 Clarkson College of Technology awarded Zisman with an Honorary Doctor of Science degree. In 1968 he was awarded the Office of Naval Research's Captain Robert Dexter Conrad Award. In 1969, he was awarded the Mayo D. Hersey Award from the American Society of Mechanical Engineers.

He was the author of over 100 publications and held 39 patents, 10 of which are held by the US Navy. He also authored Zisman's Plot method which is incorporated in ramé-hart DROPimage software. Among his greatest inventions is the NRL Contact Angle Goniometer which has been manufactured by ramé-hart instrument co., Succasunna, NJ, for over 50 years.
