= Thomas Thompson (priest) =

- Dean of Killala
- Church: Church of Ireland
- In office: 1791–1796

Personal details
- Born: July 8, 1756 County Mayo, Ireland
- Died: November 10, 1799 (aged 43)
- Denomination: Anglican
- Education: Trinity College Dublin

Thomas Thompson (8 July 1756 – 10 November 1799) was an Anglican priest in Ireland during the 18th century.

Thompson was born in County Mayo; and educated at Trinity College, Dublin. He was Dean of Killala from 1791-1796 until his death.
