= Thomas Gordon Thompson =

American oceanographer (1888–1961)

Thomas Gordon Thompson (November 28, 1888 – August 10, 1961) was an American chemist and oceanographer.

== Early life and education ==
Thompson was born on November 28, 1888, at Rose Bank, Staten Island, New York. He received his bachelor's degree from Clark University at Worcester, Massachusetts, in 1914. With the support of a scholarship from the British Iron and Steel Institute, he then began graduate studies at the University of Washington, in Seattle, Washington. He was admitted to a doctorate in chemistry from this institution in 1918.

== Career ==
During World War I, Thompson served in the United States Army in the Ordnance and Chemical Warfare Branch, rising to the rank of captain. Returning to the university in 1919, Dr. Thompson was promoted to associate professor in 1923 and to full professor in 1929.

Thompson — the first American chemist to devote his major efforts to investigating the chemistry of sea water — founded the University of Washington's oceanographic laboratories in 1930. This was an interdepartmental institution that drew its staff from the university's departments of physics, chemistry, bacteriology, botany and zoology. Two years later, as a result of Thompson's guidance, the university placed a small research vessel, Catalyst, in service to perform inshore oceanographic work in the Pacific Northwest.

Over the ensuing years, Thompson developed methods for the quantitative determination of many elements and ions in sea water e.g. aluminum, boron, copper, iron, manganese, nickel, strontium, silicon, bromine, iodine, phosphates, and nitrates. His main interest lay in determining the relationship between the chemical and physical properties of sea water — notably the specific gravity, refractivity and electrical conductivity.

Thompson participated actively in international geographic and oceanographic ventures, serving on or chairing committees and co-authoring studies of specific oceanographic matters. During World War II, he again served in the United States Army, eventually rising to the rank of colonel.

In 1945, Thompson purchased McConnell Island off Washington State, financed through the sale of his valuable stamp collection.

In 1951, Thompson's efforts in the field of oceanography were rewarded when the University of Washington established a department of oceanography. Thompson was recognized as one of the world's leading oceanographers and one of the pioneers of our understanding of the chemistry of the sea. Late in his life he was promoted to professor emeritus. He died in Seattle, Washington, on August 10, 1961.

== Namesakes ==
Two oceanographic research ships have been named Thomas G. Thompson in his honor. As of 2013, R/V Thomas G. Thompson (T-AGOR-23) is under lease to the UW School of Oceanography.
