= RV Thomas G. Thompson (T-AGOR-23) =

American oceanographic research vessel

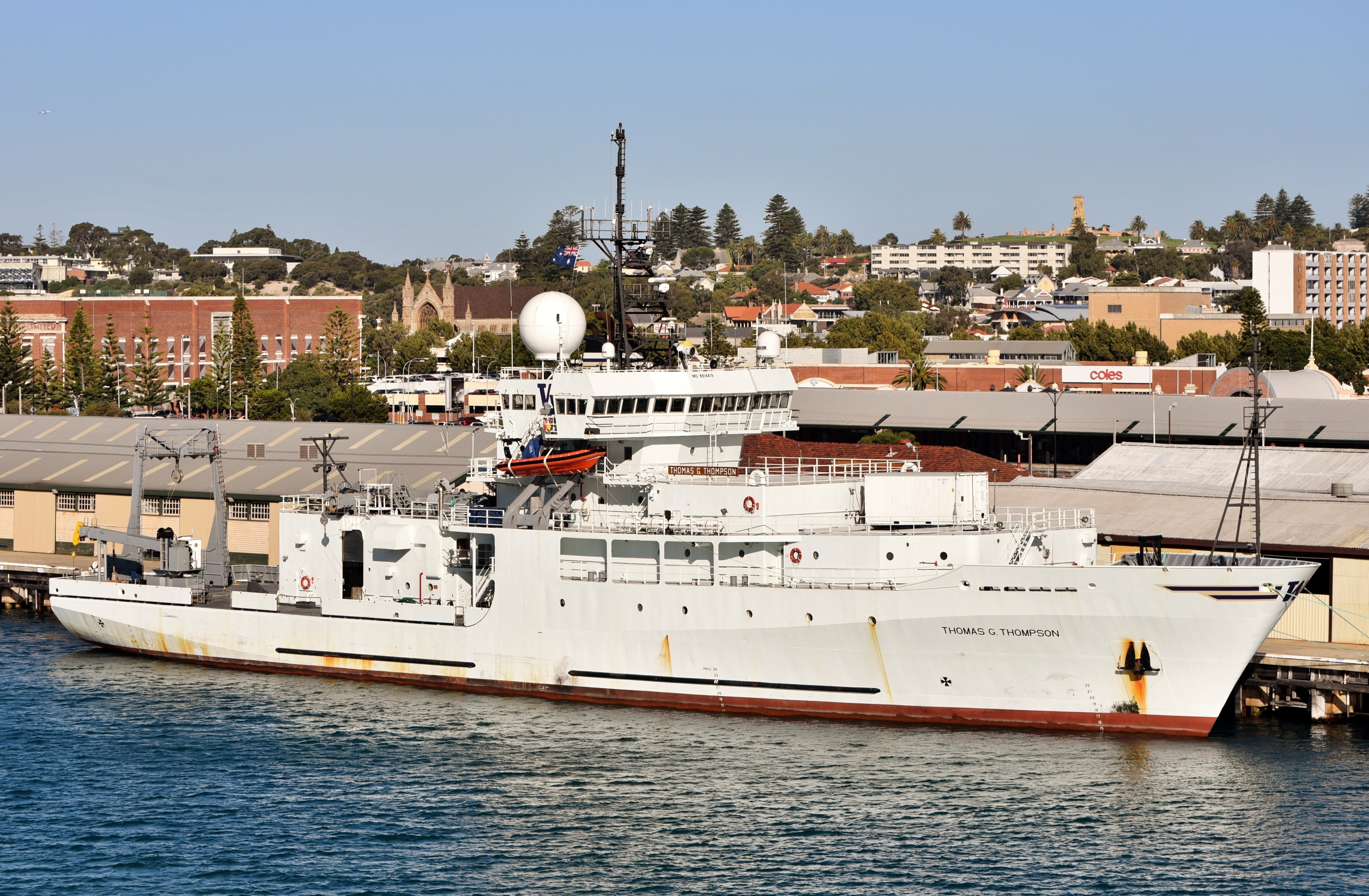
- Thomas G. Thompson in Fremantle, Australia

History

United States
- Name: Thomas G. Thompson
- Namesake: Thomas Thompson, Oceanographer
- Operator: University of Washington
- Builder: Halter Marine Inc.
- Cost: $20.9 million
- Laid down: March 29, 1989
- Launched: July 27, 1990
- Completed: July 8, 1991
- Home port: Seattle, Washington
- Identification: IMO number: 8814419; MMSI number: 366345000; Callsign: KTDQ; Official Number: 976826
- Status: Active

General characteristics
- Tonnage: 3,095 GT
- Displacement: 2,155 tons light; 3,051 full load
- Length: 274 ft (84 m)
- Beam: 52.5 ft (16.0 m)
- Draft: 19 ft (5.8 m)
- Propulsion: diesel-electric, two 3,000 hp (2,200 kW) z-drives
- Speed: 12 knots (22 km/h; 14 mph)
- Crew: 23, up to 36 scientists

RV Thomas G. Thompson (AGOR-23) is an oceanographic research vessel and lead ship of her class, owned by the United States Office of Naval Research and operated under a bareboat charterparty agreement by the University of Washington as part of the University-National Oceanographic Laboratory System (UNOLS) fleet.

== Construction and characteristics ==
The United States Navy issued bid solicitations to the shipbuilding industry for a new oceanographic research vessel on May 27, 1987. Halter Marine, Inc. won the contract for the construction of Thomas G. Thompson in June 1988. Her original contract price was $20.9 million. She was built in Moss Point, Mississippi. Her keel was laid down on March 29, 1989, and she was launched on July 27, 1990. Thomas G. Thompson was christened by Dr. Dora Henry, Oceanography Professor Emeritus at the University of Washington. The ship was completed and delivered to the Office of Naval Research on July 8, 1991.

Thomas G. Thompson is 274 feet (84 m) long, with a beam of 52.5 feet (16.0 m) and a full-load draft of 19 feet (5.8 m). The hull is of welded steel plate construction. She displaces 3,051 long tons (3,100 t) at full load. Her gross tonnage is calculated at 3,095 and her net tonnage is 928. She is classed by the American Bureau of Shipping.

She has a cruising speed of 12 knots (22 km/h; 14 mph) and a maximum speed of 15 knots (28 km/h; 17 mph). She has six diesel generators, three 1,500 kW and three 750 kW, which provide electrical and propulsion power to the ship. The generators, in turn, power two 3,000 hp DC electric motors which provide the ship's main propulsion. The DC motors power two 360-degree azimuth z-drives with four-bladed fixed-pitch propellers. The ship also has a 360-degree azimuth Tees White Gill water jet bow thruster driven by a separate 1,100 hp DC motor. Controls are installed to integrate the z-drives and bow thruster into a dynamic positioning system. Engineers can select fuel-efficient combinations of generators to power the ship whether she is towing an instrument at 1 knot, transiting at 15 knots, or anywhere in between. Her fuel tanks can hold up to 280,000 US gallons (1,100,000 L) giving her an unrefueled range of 12,000 nautical miles (22,000 km; 14,000 mi) at 15 knots.

Thomas G. Thompson normally sails with 21 civilian officers and crew, 2 marine technicians, and up to 36 scientists. The crew is unionized, represented by the Inland Boatmen's Union of the Pacific.

To support her research activities she has 4,000 square feet (370 m^{2}) of wet and dry laboratory space, multi-beam mapping sonar and other sensors, and a number of cranes and winches to lower and tow various instruments. The A-frame on her stern, the largest crane aboard, is rated for a 15-ton static load.

The University of Washington won the right to operate Thomas G. Thompson through a competitive bidding process. Invitations to bid were issued on June 5, 1987. Among the qualifications for bidders specified by the Office of Naval Research was the return of an earlier generation AGOR-3-class oceanographic vessel that the Navy could retire when the new ship was delivered. As a practical matter, this limited bidding to the University of Washington, the Scripps Institution of Oceanography, and the Lamont-Doherty Geological Observatory of Columbia University. The Office of Naval Research announced in November 1987 that it had selected the University of Washington to operate the then unnamed AGOR-23. Contracts were signed with the Navy in June 1988.

The ship is named for Thomas Gordon Thompson, who founded the University of Washington's Oceanographic Laboratories in 1930. The ship is designated by the Navy as an AGOR or "Auxiliary General-purpose Oceanographic Research" ship. She is the second research vessel named after Dr. Thompson. The first, USNS Thomas G. Thompson (T-AGOR-9), also operated by the University of Washington, was launched in 1963.

== Sister ships ==
Thomas G. Thompson is the lead ship in her class which also includes RV Roger Revelle, operated by the Scripps Institution of Oceanography, RV Atlantis, operated by the Woods Hole Oceanographic Institution and NOAAS Ronald H. Brown, operated by National Oceanic and Atmospheric Administration (NOAA). The first three are owned by the US Navy while the last ship is a NOAA-owned vessel.

== Operating history ==
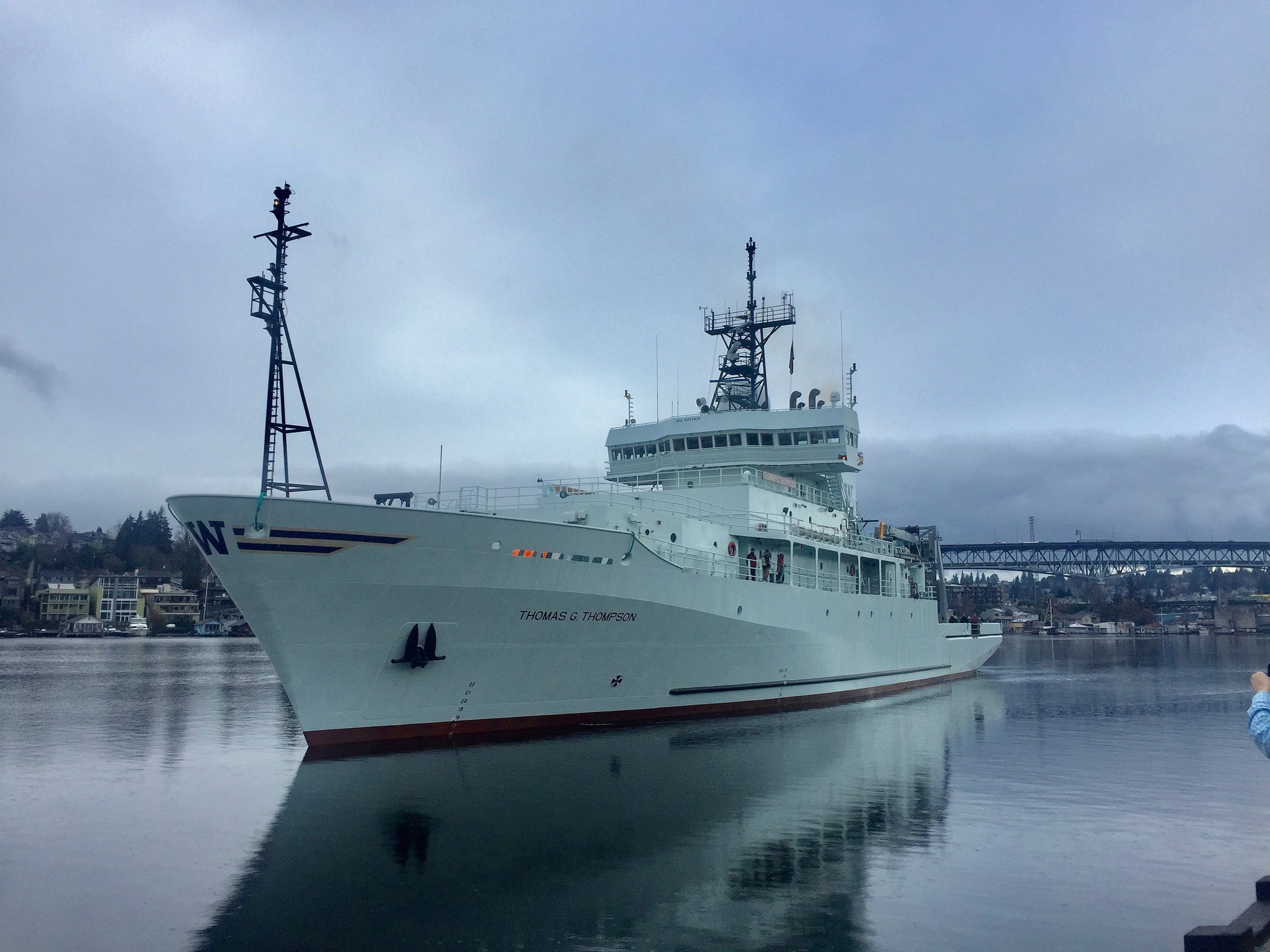
Thomas G. Thompson in 2018 after her mid-life renovation

Thomas G. Thompson is designed for long-endurance research missions in deep ocean waters and typically spends 260 to 300 days a year at sea. While she has sailed around the Earth on almost every sea and ocean, she has spent the bulk of her career in the Pacific and Indian Oceans. The hull is not ice-strengthened.

While the civilian crew is assigned to the ship permanently, the scientists rotate aboard in support of specific research programs. These have been quite varied, and include global warming, hydrothermal vents, neutrino detection, mapping ocean currents and seamounts, abyssal phytoplankton, underwater volcanic eruptions, algal blooms, and monsoons in the Indian Ocean, among many others.

The vessel also serves as an educational platform for science students of all types from elementary to graduate levels. The University of Washington funds 45 days of ship time for its own students each year. In 2004 this cost just over $1 million .

Thomas G. Thompson's expected service life was 30 years, which would have seen the ship retired in 2021. Instead, on October 16, 2014, the University of Washington issued a request for proposals for a mid-life refit. The contract was awarded to the Vigor Industrial shipyard in Seattle. Her renovation began in June 2016. The project ultimately cost $52 million, jointly funded by the Office of Naval Research, the National Science Foundation, and the University of Washington. The work is expected to extend the vessel's life by 10 to 15 years. During the refit the propulsion system was largely replaced with new diesel generators, overhauled propulsion motors, and new switchboards, control systems, and alarms, electrical cable and pipework was replaced as well as the air-conditioning, refrigeration, sewage, and freshwater systems. New research and navigation instruments were also added. The project was completed in December 2017.
