= University-National Oceanographic Laboratory System =

The University-National Oceanographic Laboratory System (UNOLS) is a group of academic institutions and National Laboratories organized in the United States to coordinate research vessel use for federally funded ocean research.

== Authority ==
The UNOLS system grew from the recognition during the rapid expansion of oceanographic activity that there was no organized means of coordinating ship time requests of researchers, particularly those from institutions not operating vessels and that more expensive ships were not the answer. Federal research sponsors were concerned about more effective use of those expensive assets. Even though a more formal National Oceanographic Laboratory system was not established the less formal and less federally controlled cooperative system of the University-National Oceanographic Laboratory System was established. The form this took lay between federal control of the fleet and uncoordinated use of the often federally owned research vessels at the institutions. UNOLS was chartered in September 1971 to coordinate and support federally funded oceanographic research through efficient usage of the fleet.

UNOLS goes beyond simple coordination of fleet activities. The system has developed standards and standard practices in cost accounting, reports, information services, shipboard equipment and services, foreign visit clearances, safety and coordinates on new vessel acquisition. In that last area UNOLS has played a part in influencing designs to most effectively support the mission. This has influenced the design of most U.S. and some foreign research vessels.

As of May 1, 2019, the office for UNOLS is located at the University of Washington School of Oceanography in Seattle.

== Federal support, cooperation and funding ==
Federal support for and cooperation with UNOLS is found in the National Science Foundation (NSF), Office of Naval Research (ONR), National Oceanic and Atmospheric Administration (NOAA), U.S. Coast Guard (USCG), U.S. Geological Survey (USGS) and the Minerals Management Service (MMS) and other agencies.

The majority of the ships are owned by federal agencies and the ships are available to all federally funded researchers. Federal agencies also utilize excess ship time in fulfilling some of their ship based requirements.

== Institutions ==
As of December 2009 sixty-one institutions are members. Some operate vessels while some are non-operator institutions. Those non-operator institutions were first associate members and are now full members.

== Vessels ==
Vessels are either owned by or, more often, assigned to and operated by the institutions. UNOLS itself is neither the operator nor the funding agency for research. Many of the vessels are owned by federal agencies with the Navy having the largest number. The National Science Foundation owns vessels operated by UNOLS institutions. The National Oceanic and Atmospheric Administration operates a large vessel, the Ronald H. Brown in cooperation with UNOLS. The U.S. Coast Guard icebreakers also cooperate on research scheduling. A number of well known research vessels have been members of the UNOLS fleet. Some are now retired or otherwise out of UNOLS service. All of the Navy owned oceanographic research (AGOR), as opposed to survey, vessels are now operated by institutions within UNOLS.

In addition to vessels UNOLS assists in scheduling oceanographic research using aircraft owned by federal agencies through the Scientific Committee for Oceanographic Aircraft Research (SCOAR).

=== Ship Classes ===
Research vessels within the UNOLS fleet fall within one of five categories:

- Global class are multipurpose, high-endurance research vessels with support for science parties of 30+. Global class ships are able to work in high seas and capable of working anywhere on the planet (excluding areas of pack ice).
- Ocean (intermediate prior to 2009) class are multipurpose, medium-endurance research vessels able to accommodate 18+ scientists. Ocean class ships are able to operate within high seas, but do not operate with the intention of global coverage.
- Regional class are general purpose ships that work within continental margins and coastal zones of variable science party size and endurance.
- Coastal (local) class are similar to regional class, though are generally of smaller size or endurance. They are capable of 24-hour operations and are designed for cost-effectiveness.
- Other/Non-ARF (not in Academic Research Fleet) are research vessels without an American oceanographic university affiliation. This includes the U.S. Coast Guard's icebreaker Healy and NOAA's Ronald H. Brown.

== See also ==
- List of auxiliaries of the United States Navy
- National Oceanic and Atmospheric Administration
- Office of Naval Research
- United States Department of Energy national laboratories
- United States Naval Research Laboratory
