= JDS Chihaya =

Submarine rescue ship Chihaya

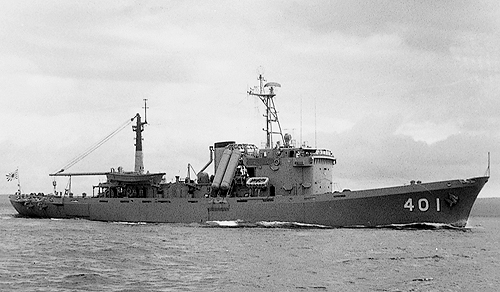
- JDS Chihaya

Class overview
- Preceded by: N/A
- Succeeded by: Fushimi class

History

Japan
- Name: Chihaya; (ちはや)
- Namesake: Chihaya
- Ordered: 1959
- Builder: Mitsubishi, Tokyo
- Laid down: 15 March 1960
- Launched: 4 October 1960
- Commissioned: 15 March 1961
- Decommissioned: 28 February 1989
- Home port: Kure
- Identification: Pennant number: ASR-401, ASU-7011
- Status: Decommissioned

General characteristics
- Type: Submarine rescue ship
- Displacement: 1,340–1,850 long tons (1,362–1,880 t) full load
- Length: 73.0 m (239 ft 6 in)
- Beam: 12.0 m (39 ft 4 in)
- Draft: 3.9 m (12 ft 10 in)
- Depth: 6.7 m (22 ft 0 in)
- Propulsion: 1 × Mitsubishi Yokohama MAN G6Z52 / 70 diesel engines (2,700 hp, 2,000 kW); 1 x shaft
- Speed: 15 knots (28 km/h; 17 mph)
- Boats & landing craft carried: 2 x 9 m (30 ft) boats
- Complement: 90
- Sensors & processing systems: OPS-4D; AN/SQS-11A sonar; 4-point mooring device

JDS Chihaya (ASR-401) was a submarine rescue ship of Japan Maritime Self-Defense Force.

== Development and design ==
The Japan Maritime Self-Defense Force (JMSDF) did not own a submarine at the time of its inauguration, but in January 1955, it was announced that a submarine would be rented as an addition to the Japan-US Ship Lending Agreement signed in May 1954. The Gato-class submarine USS Mingo was transferred to Japan and was recommissioned as JDS Kuroshio. The JMSDF had been researching rescue ships from other countries, conscious of the need for rescue ships that can handle incidents from the time of acquisition of the submarine, but the first domestically produced ship JDS Oyashio. The construction of one ship was approved in the 1959 plan when (31SS) was under construction and Chihaya was ordered.

== Construction and career ==
Chihaya was laid down on 15 March 1960 at Mitsubishi Heavy Industries, Tokyo and launched on 4 October 1960. The vessel was commissioned on 15 March 1961. On 1 August 1962, the 1st Submarine Corps was newly formed and incorporated under the Kure District Force.

On 1 February 1965, the 1st Submarine Group was newly formed under the Self-Defense Fleet and was incorporated as a ship under direct control.

On 27 March 1985, due to the commissioning of JS Chiyoda, the vessel's designation was changed to a special service ship, the ship registration number was changed to ASU-7011, and Chihaya was transferred to the Kure District Force as a ship under direct control. She was decommissioned on 28 February 1989.

== Gallery ==
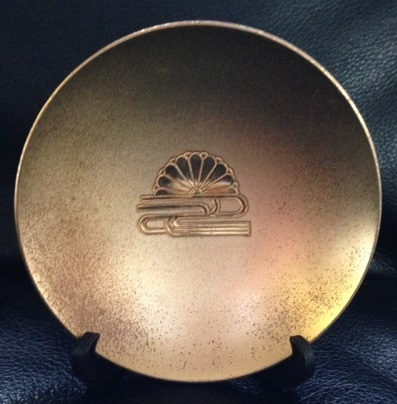
JDS Chihaya 15th Anniversary Gold Cup.
