= USS Penguin (ASR-12) =

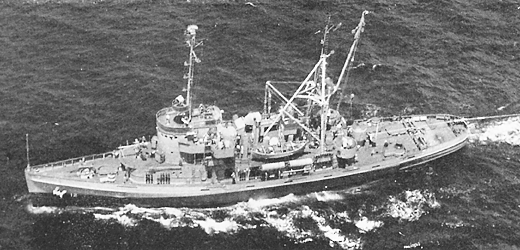

History

United States
- Name: USS Penguin
- Builder: Charleston Shipbuilding and Dry Dock Co.
- Laid down: 9 February 1943, as USS Chetco (AT-99)
- Launched: 20 July 1943
- Commissioned: 29 May 1944
- Decommissioned: June 1947
- Renamed: USS Penguin, 23 September 1943
- Reclassified: ASR–12, 23 September 1943
- Recommissioned: 3 April 1952
- Decommissioned: 29 June 1970
- Motto: De profundis; ("From the depths")

General characteristics
- Class & type: Penguin class submarine rescue ship
- Displacement: 1,740 long tons (1,768 t) full load
- Length: 205 ft (62 m)
- Beam: 39 ft 3 in (11.96 m)
- Draft: 15 ft 6 in (4.72 m)
- Speed: 16 knots (18 mph; 30 km/h)
- Complement: 91
- Armament: 1 × 3"/50 caliber guns; 4 × 20 mm; 2 × dct

The third USS Penguin (ASR–12) was a submarine rescue ship in the United States Navy during World War II. She was the lead ship of a class of three vessels (Penguin, Bluebird, and Skylark) all originally laid down as fleet ocean tugs before being converted to rescue ships before completion.

Penguin was laid down as Chetco (AT-99) by the Charleston Shipbuilding and Dry Dock Co., Charleston, South Carolina, 9 February 1943; launched 20 July 1943; sponsored by Mrs. H. S. Dickinson; renamed and reclassified USS Penguin (ASR–12), 23 September 1943; and commissioned 29 May 1944.

== North Atlantic operations ==
Penguin, a submarine rescue and salvage vessel reported for duty with SubRon 1, at New London, Connecticut, 9 June 1944. Based there after shakedown training, she served as a target and torpedo recovery ship for Allied submarines training in the area; performed towing assignments; participated in the planting and sweeping of experimental mine fields; and conducted salvage operations. Included in the latter were operations on a sunken U-boat near Block Island between April and June 1945.

Shifting to Portsmouth, New Hampshire, for the period 5 July–7 September, Penguin served as a target vessel and a rescue and salvage ship for submarines undergoing sea trials, then returned to New London, and, for the remainder of the year alternated between those two submarine bases. Permanently attached to New London with the new year, 1946, she remained there until November when she participated in cold weather operations off Newfoundland.

== Decommissioning ==
On her return to New London she continued her duties as rescue and salvage ship, target and torpedo recovery vessel, and escort and towing vessel. In June 1947 she joined the Atlantic Reserve Fleet, decommissioning, at Atlantic Reserve Fleet, New London, 4 September.

== Reactivation for Atlantic operations ==
Penguin, berthed at New London for four and a half years, recommissioned 3 April 1952. On 28 April, she reported for duty with the Atlantic Fleet's Submarine Forces, and on 23 July, arrived at Key West, her new homeport. For the next nine years, with only occasional interruptions for submarine exercises or salvage operations in the Caribbean, and, in August 1954, off Newfoundland, she carried out her mission in the Key West area for SubRon 12. During that period, however, she established a new record for ships of her class by "rescuing", during training operations, personnel from a submarine 349' below the surface, 24 February 1955.

In 1961, Penguin entered another first on her record. On 20 March she departed for Rota, Spain, becoming the first ASR to be deployed to the Sixth Fleet. Since that time she has continued salvage operations, primarily on downed aircraft, and weapons evaluation tests; provided target and torpedo recovery services; and performed towing services for the Atlantic Fleet and, in 1963, 1964, 1967 and 1969, for the 6th Fleet. While with the latter she has also served as flagship for that fleet's submarine force. Fortunately, however, into 1970, she had not been called on to conduct rescue operations for an actual submarine disaster.
