= ROKS Cheonghaejin =

Cheonghaejin-class submarine rescue ship

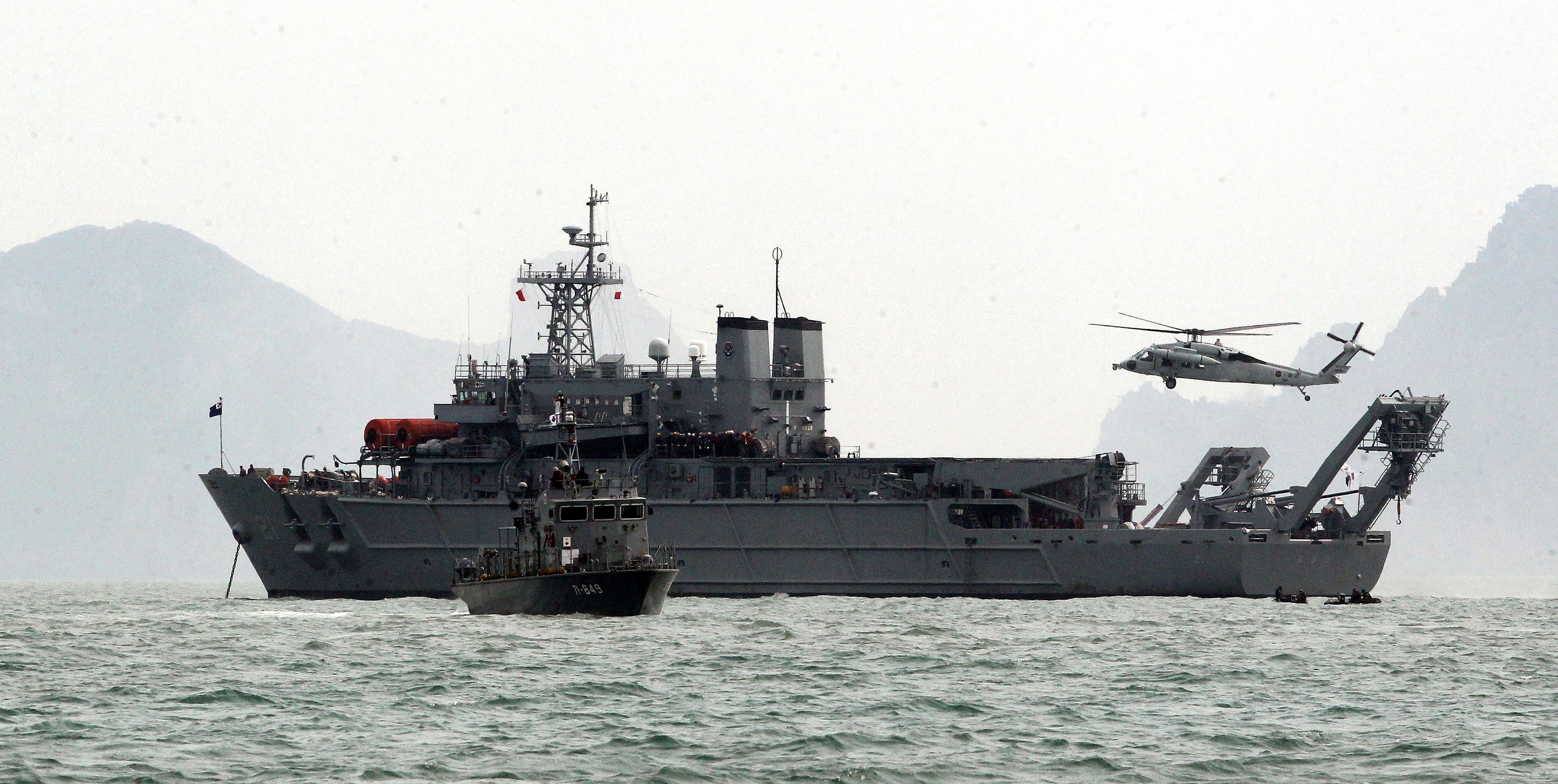
- ROKS Cheonghaejin on 21 April 2014

History

South Korea
- Name: Cheonghaejin; (청해진)
- Namesake: Cheonghaejin
- Builder: Hanjin
- Launched: 18 October 1995
- Commissioned: 2 December 1996
- Identification: Pennant number: ASR-21
- Status: Active

General characteristics
- Class & type: Cheonghaejin-class submarine rescue ship
- Displacement: 3,200 tonnes (3,149 long tons) light; 4,300 tonnes (4,232 long tons) full load
- Length: 102.8 m (337 ft 3 in)
- Beam: 16.4 m (53 ft 10 in)
- Draft: 4.6 m (15 ft 1 in)
- Speed: 18 knots (33 km/h; 21 mph)
- Complement: 140 crew
- Sensors & processing systems: AN/SPS-64V surface-search radar; Sonar
- Armament: 1 × M61 Vulcan; 6 × M2 Browning machine gun
- Aircraft carried: 1 × SH-60 Seahawk
- Aviation facilities: Helipad

ROKS Cheonghaejin (ASR-21) is the only ship of the Cheonghaejin-class submarine rescue ship in the Republic of Korea Navy. She is named after the military headquarter, Cheonghaejin.

== Design ==
Her operations include rescuing trapped sailors in submarines, naval operation support for submarines, underwater research and mapping support, and recovery of sunk vessels. It is equipped with a deep submergence rescue vehicle (DSRV) that operates up to 500 metres (1,600 ft), and a rescue chamber that holds up to nine people.

Once all nine Son Wonil-class submarines are delivered to the Republic of Korea Navy, another ASR ship of the same class is planned to be built.

== Construction and career ==
ROKS Cheonghaejin was launched on 18 October 1995 by Daewoo Shipbuilding and commissioned on 2 December 1996.

She salvaged a North Korean Yugo-class submarine in 1998.

She salvaged Chamsuri-class patrol boat #357 that was sunk during the naval clash in 2002 with North Korea.

== Gallery ==
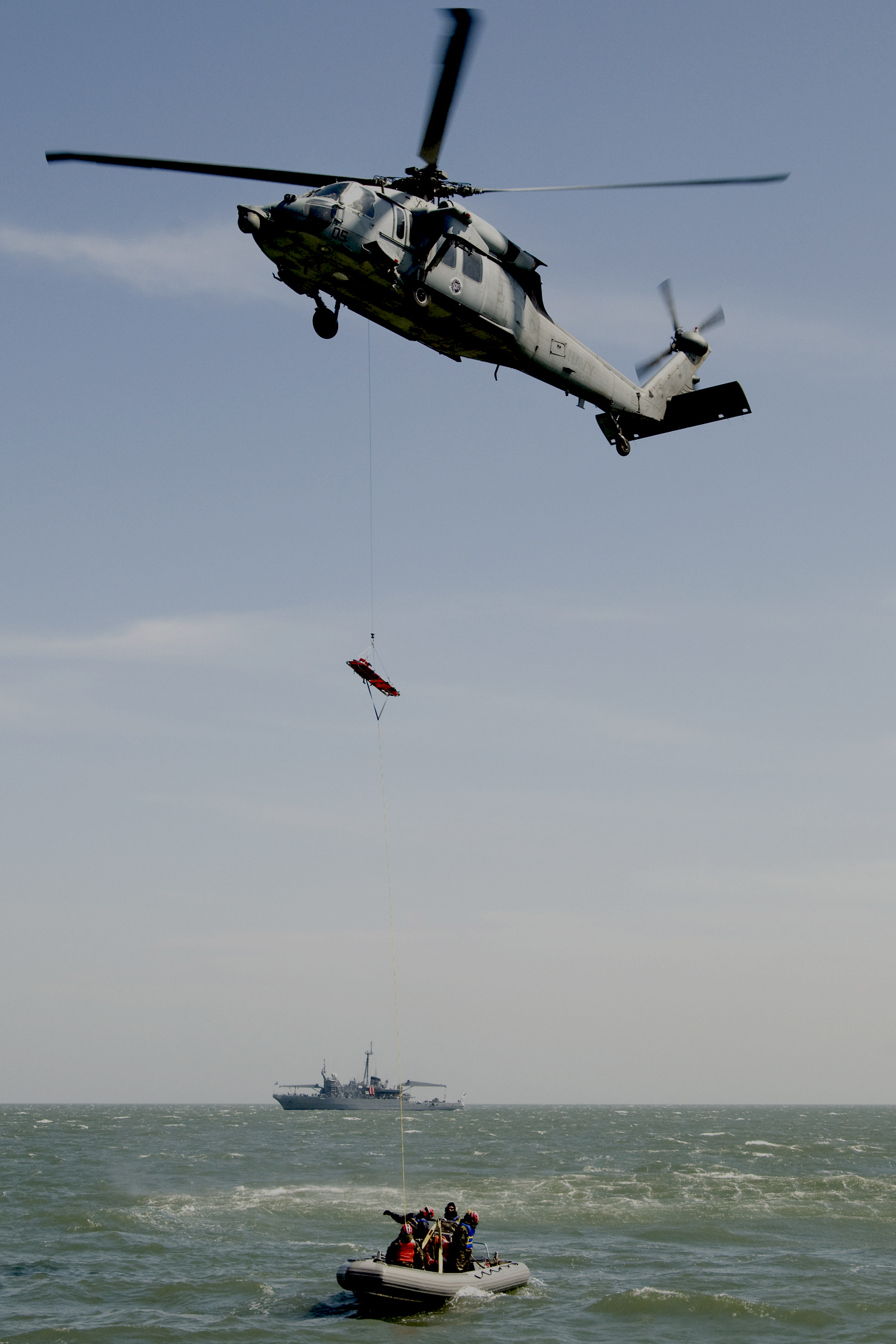
ROKS Gwangyang on 6 April 2010

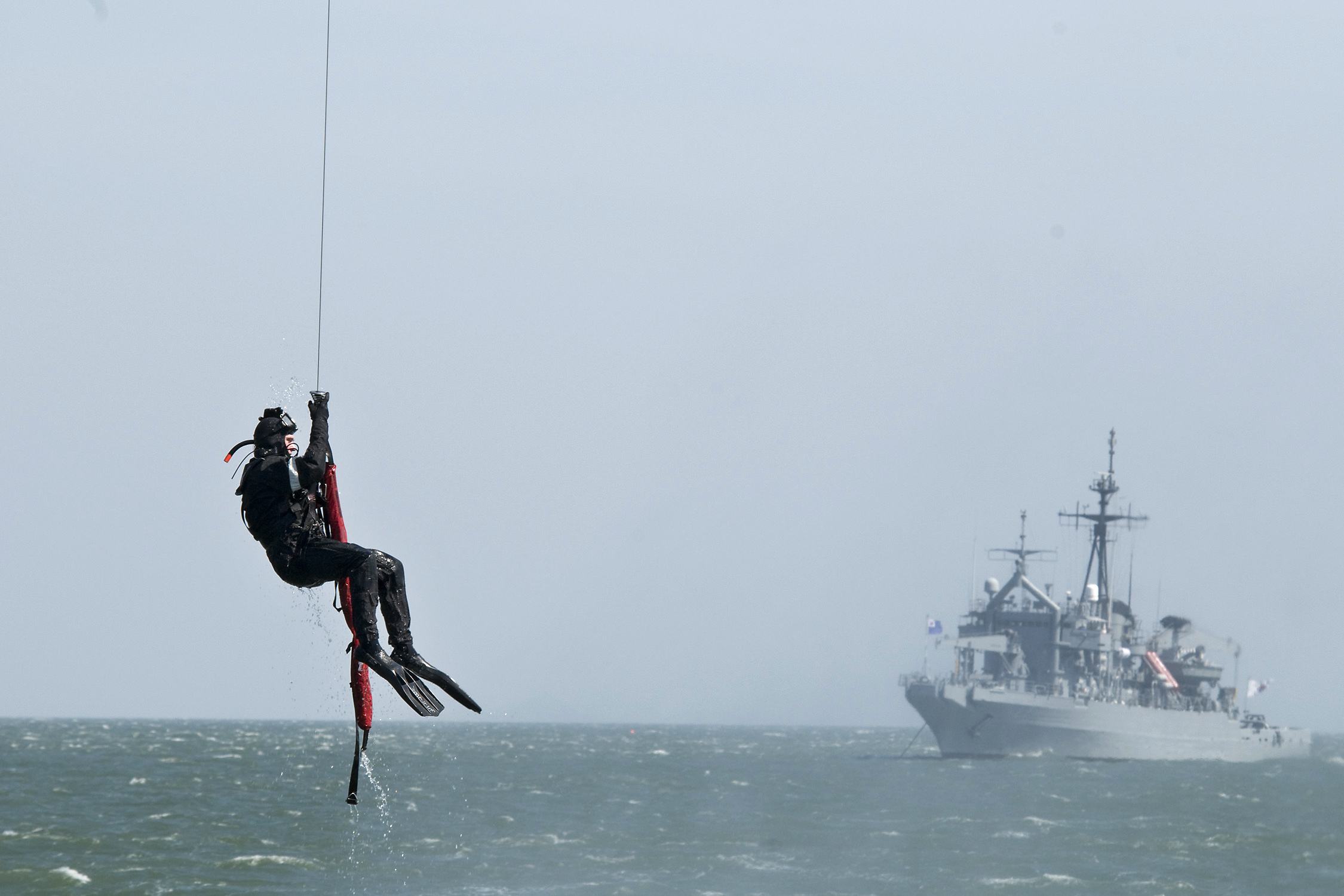

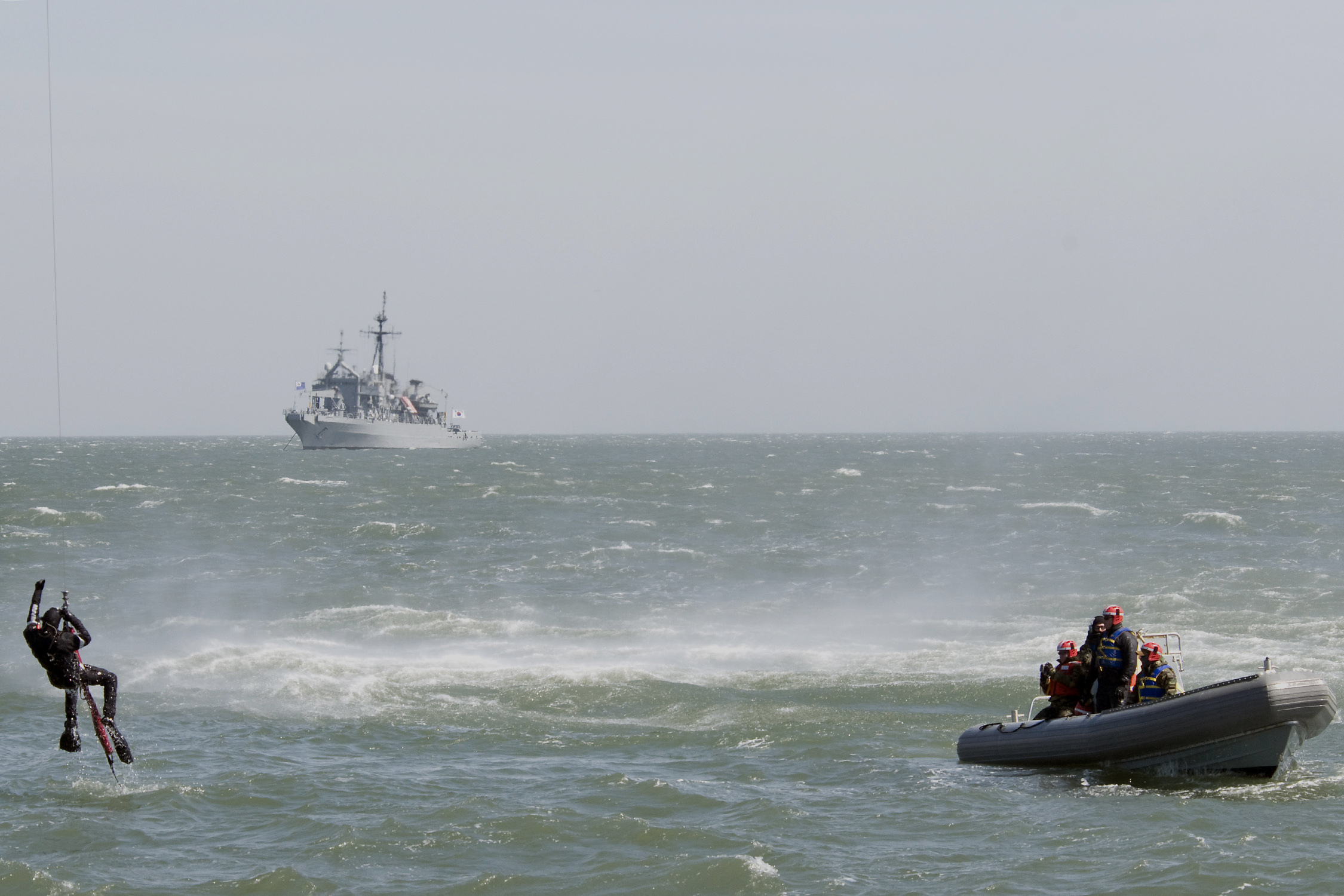
