= INS Nireekshak =

Indian support and rescue vessel

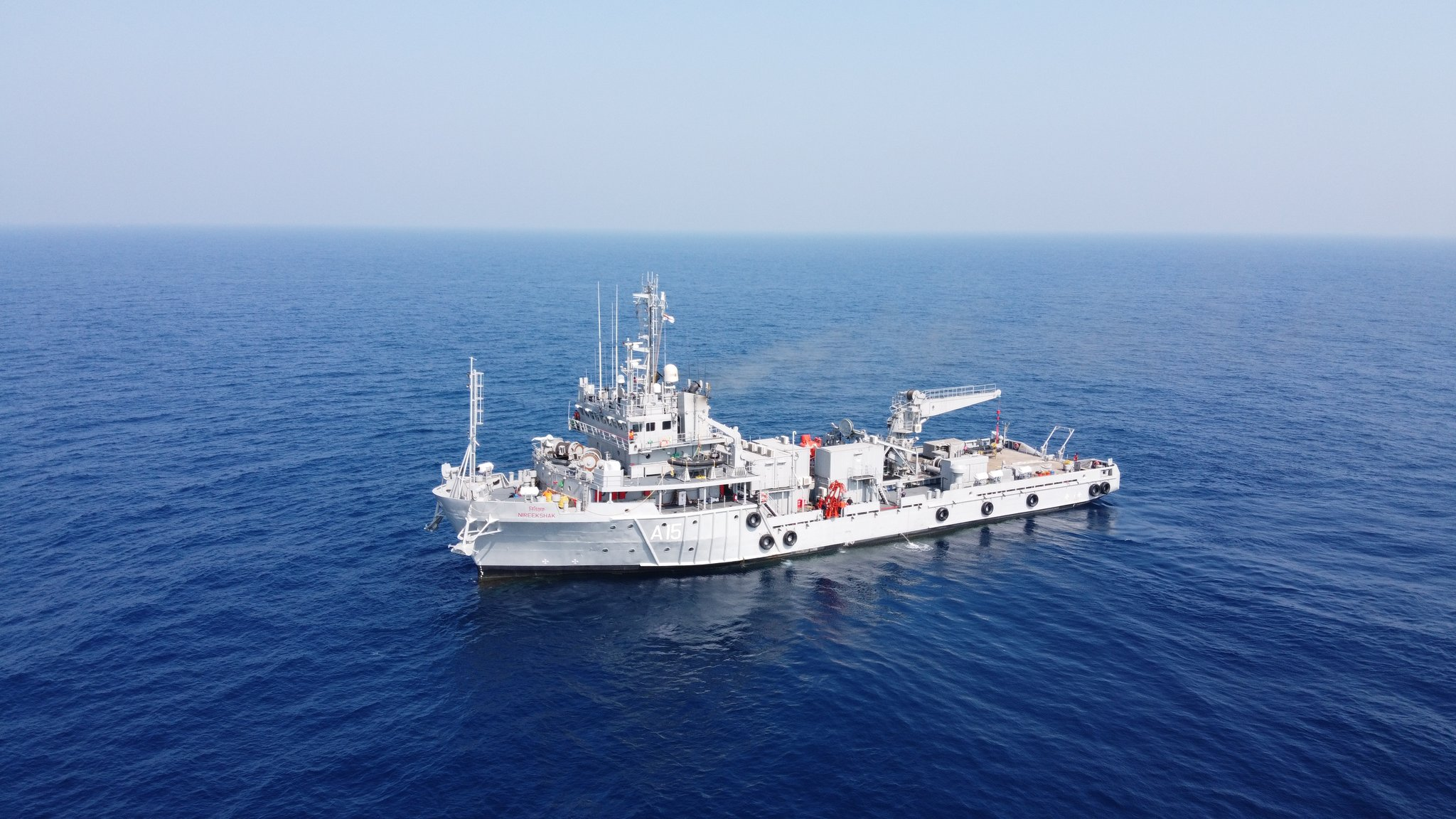
- INS Nireekshak (A15) at sea.

History

India
- Name: Nireekshak
- Builder: Mazagon Dock, Mumbai
- Acquired: by charter, 1988
- Commissioned: 8 June 1989
- Identification: IMO number: 8111996
- Status: Active

General characteristics
- Displacement: 2,160 long tons (2,190 t) standard; 3,600 long tons (3,700 t) full load
- Length: 70.5 m (231 ft 4 in) o/a
- Beam: 17.5 m (57 ft 5 in)
- Depth: 5 m (16 ft 5 in)
- Propulsion: 2 × diesel engines, 5,015 shp (3,740 kW); 2 × shafts; Kongsberg Maritime ADP-503 Mk.II dynamic positioning system, 2 bow thrusters, 2 stern thrusters with 990 hp (738 kW)
- Speed: 12 knots (22 km/h; 14 mph)
- Complement: 63 (incl. 15 officers)

INS Nireekshak (A15) (Inspector) is a diving support vessel (DSV) of Indian Navy. It can also function as interim submarine rescue vessel (SRV).

== Design and acquisition ==
Nireekshak was originally built by the Mazagon Dock Limited, Mumbai, for the Oil and Natural Gas Corporation's offshore oil exploration work, having a dynamic position facility and a recompression chamber. It was however acquired on lease with an option for purchase by Indian Navy and was commissioned on 8 June 1989. The ship was modified and refitted with the diving bell and other rescue equipment removed from the former Russian submarine rescue vessel INS Nistar in a dry dock. In March 1995 the purchase option was invoked and the vessel was formally re-commissioned on 15 September 1995. The ship is equipped with two Deep Submergence Rescue Vehicles (DSRV), capable of taking 12 men to 300 meters together, with two six-man recompression chambers and one three-man diving bell. It is intended to facilitate rescue from a submarine in distress and training of saturation divers. Its pennant number is A-15.

== Service history ==
In January 2013 a team of saturation divers from Nireekshak set a new national diving record, operating at 257 metres (843 ft) in the Arabian Sea, about 35 nautical miles (65 km; 40 mi) off Kochi, and beating their own record of 233 metres (764 ft) set in February 2011.

On 16 April 2016, a sailor lost his leg while two others were injured in an oxygen cylinder explosion on board the ship. The explosion took place while a diving bailout bottle, a small 12-inch oxygen bottle which is carried by divers in their diving helmet, was being charged. This incident has never happened in history of the Indian Navy before. One sailor sustained serious injuries and his right leg was amputated from just above the knee and two other sailors received splinter injuries in the stomach region and legs. They were admitted in Military Hospital, Trivandrum as ship was on it way to Mumbai from Visakhapatnam.

The ship, commanded by Commander Sailesh Kumar Tyagi, reached the Port of Colombo, Sri Lanka to participate in the fourth edition of IN-SLN DIVEX 2026, a bilateral diving exercise with the Sri Lanka Navy scheduled from 21 to 27 April 2026. The ship also delivered 50,000 rounds of 9×19mm Parabellum rounds to the Sri Lanka Navy. The visit is also aimed to act as an operational turnaround.

== Gallery ==
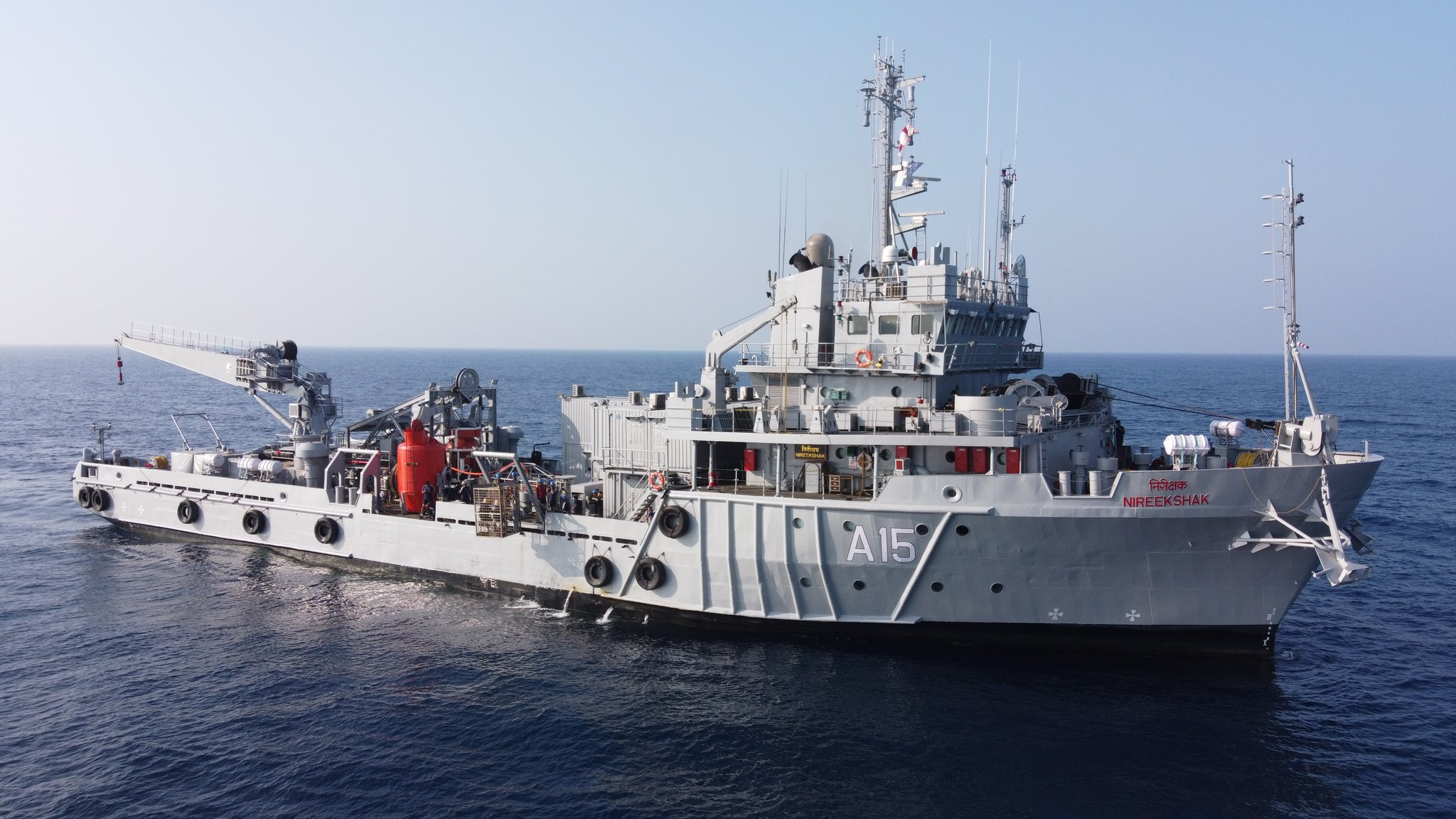
INS Nireekshak (A15) entering Mangalore port.

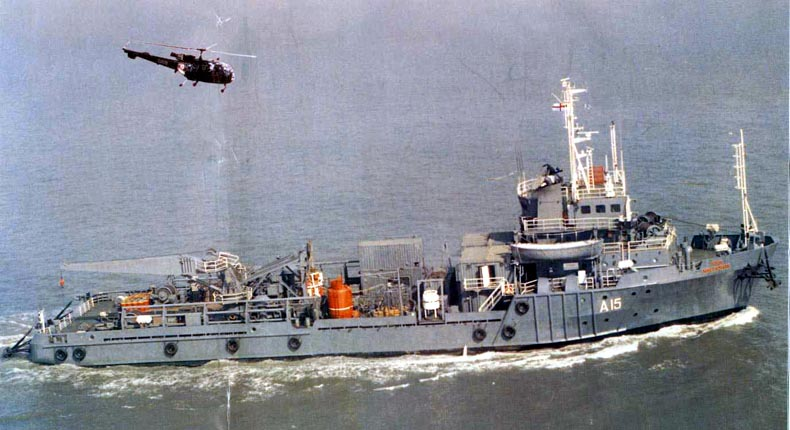
INS Nireekshak (A15) at sea.

== See also ==
- List of active Indian Navy ships
- Future ships of the Indian Navy
