= USS Verdin (ASR-17) =

History

United States
- Name: USS Verdin
- Builder: Savannah Machine & Foundry Co.
- Status: Contract cancelled

General characteristics
- Class & type: Chanticleer-class submarine rescue ship
- Displacement: 1,780 long tons (1,809 t)
- Length: 251 ft 4 in (76.61 m)
- Draught: 14 ft 3 in (4.34 m)
- Speed: 16 knots (18 mph; 30 km/h)
- Complement: 102 officers and enlisted
- Armament: 2 × 3"/50 caliber guns

USS Verdin (ASR-17) – projected as a Chanticleer-class submarine rescue vessel – was to be built at Savannah, Georgia, by the Savannah Machine & Foundry Co.; but, because of Japan's collapse, the contract for her construction was cancelled on 5 August 1945.
