= USS Sunbird =

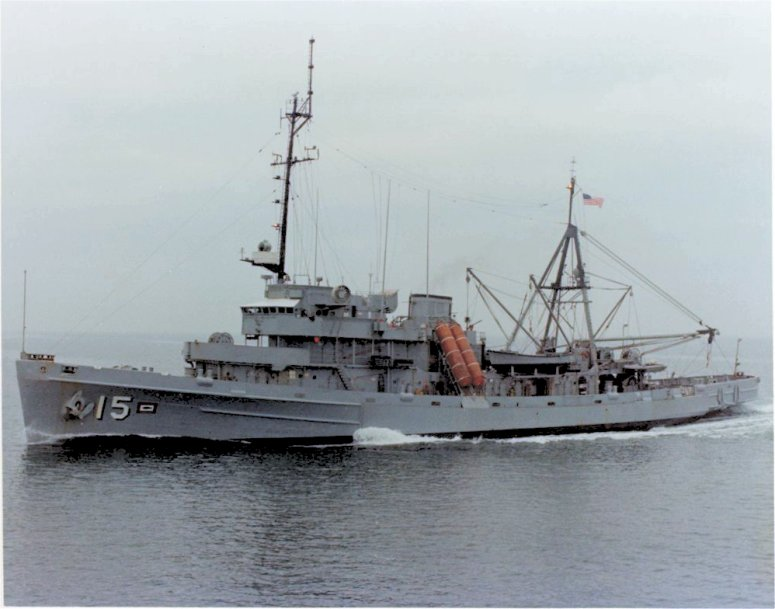

History

United States
- Name: USS Sunbird
- Builder: Savannah Machine Foundry Co., Savannah, Georgia
- Laid down: 2 April 1945
- Launched: 3 April 1946
- Commissioned: 23 June 1950
- Decommissioned: 30 September 1993
- Stricken: 2 November 1993
- Fate: Sold for scrapping, 2005

General characteristics
- Class & type: Chanticleer-class submarine rescue ship
- Displacement: 1,790 long tons (1,819 t)
- Length: 251 ft (77 m)
- Beam: 44 ft (13 m)
- Draft: 16 ft (4.9 m)
- Speed: 16 knots (30 km/h; 18 mph)
- Complement: 123 officers and enlisted
- Armament: 2 × 3"/50 caliber guns; 8 × 20 mm guns

USS Sunbird (ASR-15) was a Chanticleer-class submarine rescue ship in the United States Navy.

Sunbird was laid down on 2 April 1945 by the Savannah Machine and Foundry Co., Savannah, Georgia, and launched on 3 April 1946, sponsored by Mrs. John H. Lassiter. Sunbird was accepted by the Navy, inactivated, and towed to the Charleston Navy Yard on 15 January 1947. She was commissioned at New London, Connecticut, on 23 June 1950.

== Service history ==
=== 1950–1959 ===
Sunbird held sea trials at New London before moving to the Norfolk Naval Shipyard for modernization from August to October. While holding refresher training off Guantánamo Bay on 29 November, she rescued two survivors of a plane crash.

Sunbird trained off New London from December 1950 to May 1951 at which time she alternated two-week training periods between there and Norfolk. Off Norfolk on 14 May, she came to the rescue of Valcour (AVP-55) which had been in a collision with a merchantman, badly holed and set on fire. She then returned to New London until November, at which time she made a round trip recreational cruise to Bermuda, British West Indies.

Following an overhaul at the Boston Navy Yard, from January to March 1952, Sunbird operated along the east coast from Greenland to the Caribbean. In June 1954 she towed a disabled submarine from Cape Hatteras to Norfolk. In March 1956, Sunbird assisted Skylark (ASR-20) in removing the frigate Willis A. Lee (DL-4) from rocks in Narragansett Bay where she had been driven by a blizzard. In November of that year, she salvaged a torpedo retriever boat from a ledge off Block Island. These local operations continued until November 1959.

Sunbird had some of her rescue equipment removed in late November 1959 to enable the installation of two huge wire parbuckling nets and large racks. This was Launch Test Vehicle (LTV) recovery equipment which transformed her into the first dummy Polaris missile recovery ship.

=== 1960–1969 ===
In February 1960, Sunbird was called to aid two tugs that were towing the decommissioned escort aircraft carrier Chenango (CVHE-28). The carrier had grounded on the north shore of Long Island and the recovery ship was successful in refloating her. Later in the month, divers from Sunbird aided in refloating the Apollo (AS-25) which had grounded at the mouth of the Thames River.

In March, Sunbird recovered 15 missiles that had been fired from ballistic submarines. By 1 July 1960, the ship had greatly contributed to the Polaris Program in recovering 46 of the seven and one-half ton missiles. In August and September, she operated off Cape Kennedy during Polaris test firings. In January 1961, the rescue ship was ordered to Texas Tower 4 to search for survivors of the tower which had collapsed. Her divers made 174 dives in searching the wreckage, with many to depths of 180 feet. The ship then engaged in local operations until mid-1962.

In July 1962, Sunbird towed YFNB-31 from Philadelphia to Holy Loch, Scotland. From 1 August to 24 October she served as flagship of Task Force (TF) 69 while operating with the 6th Fleet in the Mediterranean. She returned to New London and was in an upkeep status until the end of November. Local operations followed until April 1963 when she was dispatched to the Thresher (SSN-593) search area for a week, with negative results. She returned to normal east coast fleet operations until 5 January 1965 when she got underway for a four-month deployment with the 6th Fleet which ended on 1 May. In October, she participated in Operation "Springboard 65" in the Caribbean and returned to New London on 12 November 1965.

Sunbird stood out of New London on 11 April 1966 en route to Rota, Spain. Two days out of that port her orders were changed to proceed to Naples, Italy, and join the 6th Fleet. While attached to the 6th Fleet, in addition to routine duties, she was called upon to perform special operations. The ship was detached on 20 May and proceeded to Spain and thence, on 27 June, to Holy Loch where she provided services for Submarine Squadron (SubRon) 16 until 22 July when she sailed for New London, arriving there on 1 August 1966.

The year 1967 was an uneventful year for Sunbird and, from 11 September 1967 to 11 January 1968, she was being overhauled. On 27 May 1968, the ship was operating in the Narragansett Bay operating area when she was ordered to proceed south and aid in the search for the missing nuclear submarine Scorpion (SSN-589). Sunbird arrived at the scene and began operating with Pargo (SSN-650) in a search area along the 50-fathom curve. Scorpion was not found, but the two ships did find three uncharted hulls, including a German World War II submarine. The ASR was detached on 6 June to return to New London. Other than normal operations and providing services to SubRon 2, the year 1969 was highlighted by the rescue of five fishermen, on 27 May, from a fishing boat.

=== 1970–1979 ===
Sunbird was deployed to the 6th Fleet from 6 April to 30 July 1970 and from 3 January to 4 May 1972. In 1971, other than local operations, the ship was overhauled at Philadelphia from 11 February to 18 May. She deployed to the Caribbean for two tours in 1974. Sunbird operated from her home port of New London with the Atlantic Fleet into February 1975. In September–October 1976, Sunbird (under CO Edward Craig) and the research submarine NR-1 performed the recovery operation of a Phoenix missile lost from an F-14. The F-14 experienced a throttle malfunction and "taxied" off the deck of the aircraft carrier USS John F. Kennedy. Sunbird secured the missile after NR-1 recovered it from the bottom.

=== 1980–1993 ===
During the period 12 February through 22 April 1986, Sunbird, in company with NR-1, participated in the search, location and recovery of debris and wreckage from the ill-fated Space Shuttle Challenger (STS-51L). During this operation, Sunbird conducted numerous dives, recovering several pieces of shuttle debris, and providing surface support to NR-1, who ultimately located a part of the solid rocket booster suspected as the cause of this tragic casualty.

=== Decommissioning and disposal ===
Sunbird was decommissioned on 30 September 1993, laid up in the Atlantic Reserve Fleet, and struck from the Naval Vessel Register on 2 November 1993. She was transferred to MARAD custody on 1 May 1999, for lay up in the National Defense Reserve Fleet, James River, Virginia. The contract for scrapping was awarded to Bay Bridge Enterprises, Chesapeake, Virginia, on 18 July 2005, and the ex-Sunbird was removed on 17 August 2005 by Bay Bridge Enterprises, and scrapping was completed on 12 November 2005.

== Award ==
- Navy Unit Commendation with star
- Meritorious Unit Commendation
- Navy E Ribbon
- National Defense Service Medal with two stars
- Sea Service Deployment Ribbon
