= JDS Fushimi =

Submarine rescue ship Fushimi

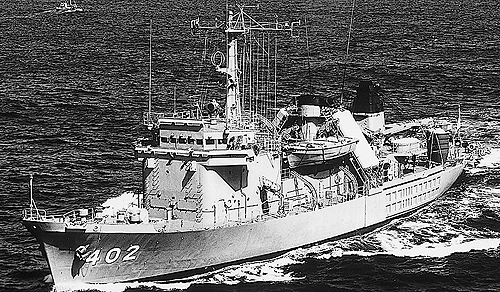
- JDS Fushimi

History

Japan
- Name: Fushimi; (ふしみ)
- Namesake: Fushimi
- Ordered: 1967
- Builder: Sumitomo, Tokyo
- Laid down: 5 November 1968
- Launched: 10 September 1969
- Commissioned: 10 February 1970
- Decommissioned: 24 March 2000
- Home port: Yokosuka (1970–1985); Kure (1985–2000)
- Identification: Pennant number: ASR-402
- Status: Decommissioned

Class overview
- Preceded by: Chihaya class (1960)
- Succeeded by: Chiyoda-class (1983)

General characteristics
- Type: Submarine rescue ship
- Displacement: 1,430–1,950 long tons (1,453–1,981 t) full load
- Length: 76.0 m (249 ft 4 in)
- Beam: 12.5 m (41 ft 0 in)
- Draft: 3.8 m (12 ft 6 in)
- Depth: 6.7 m (22 ft 0 in)
- Propulsion: 2 × Kawasaki Shipyard MAN V6 V22 / 30ATL diesel engines (3,000 hp, 2,200 kW); 2 x shafts
- Speed: 16 knots (30 km/h; 18 mph)
- Complement: 100
- Sensors & processing systems: OPS-9; AN/SQS-11A sonar; 4-point mooring device

JDS Fushimi (ASR-402) was a submarine rescue ship of Japan Maritime Self-Defense Force.

== Development and design ==
The Maritime Self-Defense Force built JDS Chihaya in the 1959 and started the operation of the submarine rescue ship. At that time, the Maritime Self-Defense Force's submarines were centrally deployed at the Kure base, and the ship also supported the submarine unit with Kure as its home port. However, after that, as the number of submarine units increased, a submarine base was also set up at Yokosuka base, so this ship was built as a second submarine rescue ship to be deployed here.

This ship is basically an advanced version of JDS Chihaya, but it was said that some parts have been forced to down due to lack of budget. Similar to JDS Chihaya, the design method is a commercial ship structure because of the need for cost reduction, and the ship type is an obstruction deck type with a two-layer deck, but there are two chimneys. It was also equipped with an anti-sway tank (ART) to facilitate offshore work.

As the main engine, Kawasaki Shipyard MAN V6 V22 / 30ATL diesel engine, which is a V-type 6-cylinder engine linked to the lineage of the VV22 / 30 series that was common in auxiliary ships of this period, propels one propeller axis. The same goes for the propeller being a variable-pitch propeller.

== Construction and career ==
Fushimi was laid down on 5 November 1968 at Sumitomo Heavy Industries, Tokyo and launched on 10 September 1969. The vessel was commissioned on 10 February 1970.

On 16 October 1973, the 2nd Submarine Group was newly formed under the Self-Defense Fleet and was incorporated as a ship under direct control.

On 27 March 1985, JDS Chihaya belonging to the 1st Submarine Group was changed to a special service ship, so it was reorganized into the same group and the homeport was also transferred to Kure.

On 24 March 2000, she was decommissioned due to the commissioning of JS Chihaya.
