= Cheonghaejin-class submarine rescue ship =

Submarine rescue ship

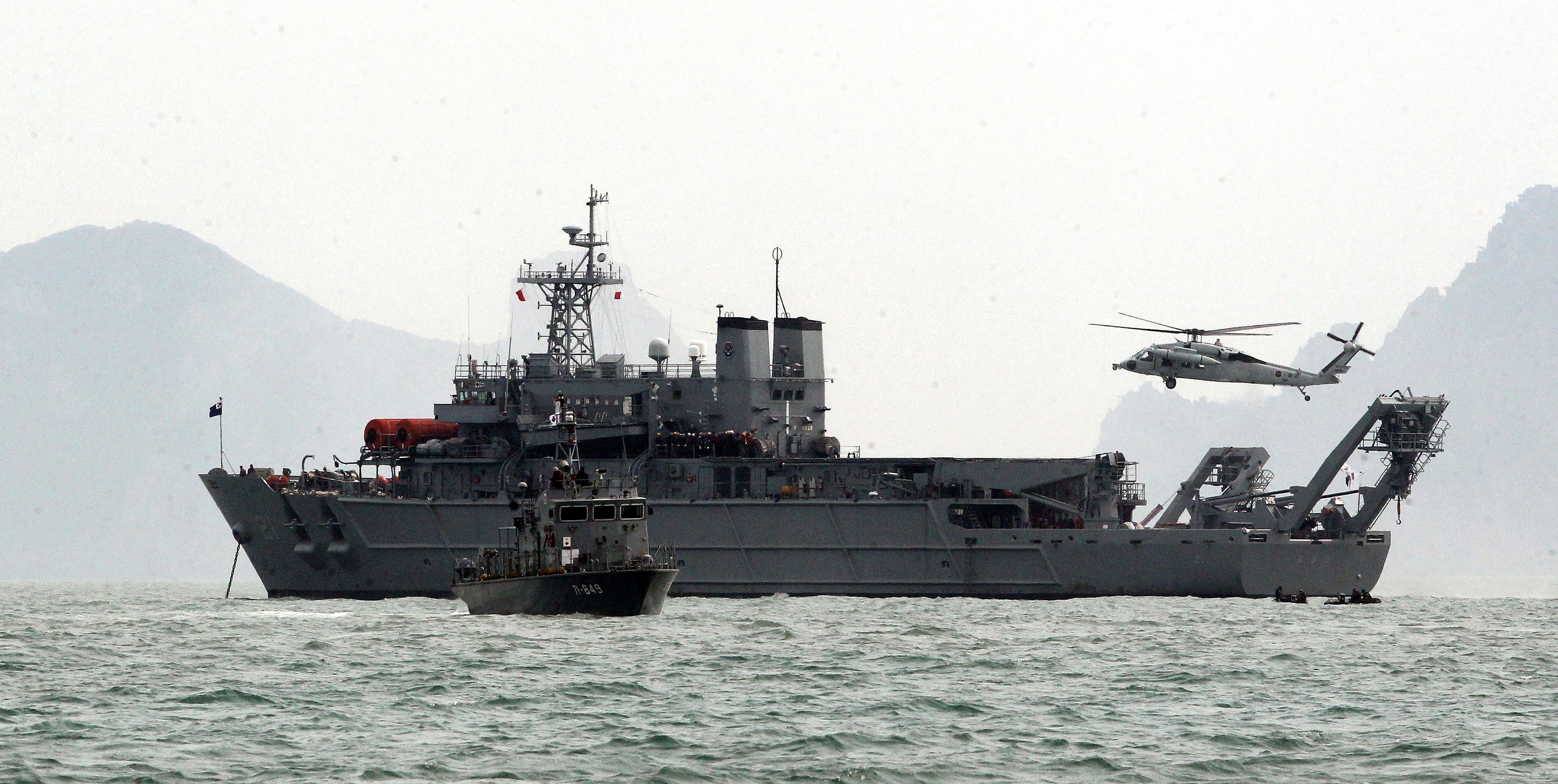

Class overview
- Builders: Daewoo, Okpo
- Operators: Republic of Korea Navy
- Built: 1994–1996
- In commission: 1996–present
- Planned: 1
- Completed: 1
- Active: 1

General characteristics
- Type: Submarine rescue ship
- Displacement: 4,330 t (4,260 long tons)
- Length: 102.8 m (337 ft 3 in)
- Beam: 16.4 m (53 ft 10 in)
- Draught: 4.6 m (15 ft 1 in)
- Installed power: Diesel-electric; 4 × diesel engines, 2,200 kW (2,950 bhp) each; 2 × electric motors, 4,060 kW (5,440 shp)
- Propulsion: 2 × controllable pitch propellers; 3 × bow thrusters; 2 × stern thrusters
- Speed: 18.5 knots (34.3 km/h; 21.3 mph)
- Range: 9,500 nmi (17,600 km; 10,900 mi) at 15 knots (28 km/h; 17 mph)
- Boats & landing craft carried: 2 x LCVPs; 1 × deep submergence rescue vehicle
- Complement: 130
- Sensors & processing systems: Hull-mounted sonar
- Armament: 6 × 12.7 mm (0.50 in) machine guns
- Aviation facilities: Platform for light helicopter

The Cheonghaejin class (Hangul: 청해진급 잠수함 구조함; Hanja: 淸海鎭級潛水艦救助艦) is a submarine rescue ship class of the Republic of Korea Navy. Only one ship has been built in the class, ROKS Cheonghaejin (ASR 21), in 1995. Its operations include rescuing trapped sailors in submarines, naval operation support for submarines, underwater research and mapping support, and recovery of sunk vessels. It is equipped with a deep submergence rescue vehicle (DSRV) that operates up to 500 metres (1,600 ft), and a rescue chamber that holds up to nine people.

== Design and description ==
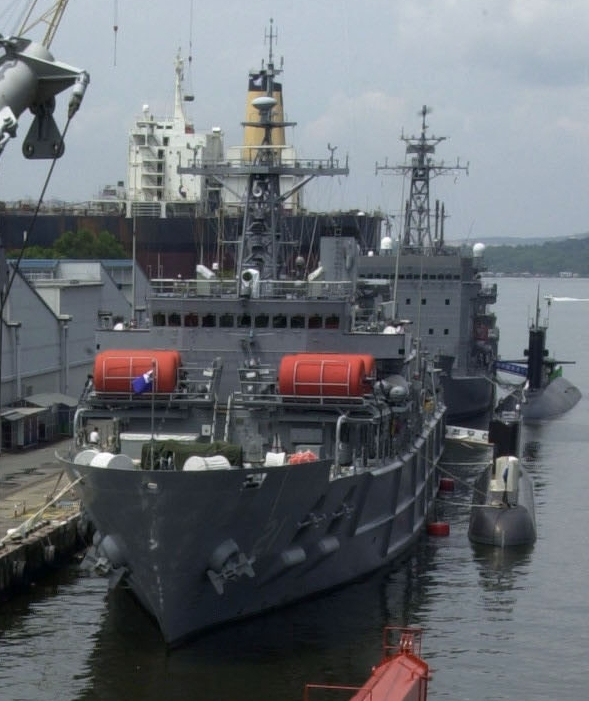
Cheonghaejin from the bow

The design for a submarine rescue ship was first offered for export as the DW 4000R Koje class. One ship of the design was ordered in 1992 to support the Republic of Korea Navy (ROKN)'s submarine fleet. The vessel is capable of providing battery charging, provisions, fuel, oxygen and water to ROKN submarines. The ship measured 102.8 metres (337 ft 3 in) long with a beam of 16.4 metres (53 ft 10 in) and a draught of 4.6 metres (15 ft 1 in). At full load, the ship displaces 4,300 tonnes (4,200 long tons). The vessel is powered by a diesel-electric system comprising four MAN Burmeister & Wain 16 V 28/32 diesel engines creating 2,200 kilowatts (2,950 bhp) each and two electric motors, creating 4,060 kW (5,440 shp). These power the two shafts with controllable pitch propellers, three bow thrusters and two stern thrusters. This gives the ship a maximum speed of 18.5 knots (34.3 km/h; 21.3 mph) and a range of 9,500 nautical miles (17,600 km; 10,900 mi) at 15 knots (28 km/h; 17 mph). The vessel is also equipped with shaped rudders and a dynamic positioning system, which allows the ship to better maneuver at low speeds. The ship has a crew of 130 personnel.

The submarine rescue ship is equipped with two 2,000 kW shaft generators and four 400 kW diesel generator sets that create a total of 5,600 kW of electric power. These are used to power two electrohydraulic telescoping cranes at the fore and an A-frame crane on the stern used to handle the assigned deep submergence vehicle (DSRV). The initial DSRV was capable of operating to a depth of 300 m (980 ft). However, a new DSRV was assigned to the Cheonghaejin class in November 2008. DSAR-5 is capable of operating up to 500 m (1,600 ft). The DSRV measures 9.6 m (31 ft 6 in) long with a beam of 2.7 m (8 ft 10 in) and a draught of 3.8 m (12 ft 6 in) and has a crew of three. The DSRV can transport up to 16 people. Additional capabilities include a diving bell capable of transporting nine people and a decompression chamber. The Cheonghaejin class has a towing winch and carries two landing craft vehicle personnel on davits for use as work boats. The ship has hull-mounted sonar and a landing platform for a light helicopter. The vessel is armed with six 12.7-millimetre (0.50 in) machine guns.

== Ships in class ==
Cheonghaejin class construction data
Pennant number	Name	Laid down	Launched	Commissioned	Status
ASR 21	Cheonghaejin (청해진)	December 1994	17 October 1995	30 November 1996	In service

== Construction and career ==
The only ship of the class, Cheonghaejin, was ordered for construction by Daewoo at their shipyard in Okpo. The vessel's keel was laid down in December 1994 and the ship was launched on 17 October 1995. Cheonghaejin was commissioned on 30 November 1996 and entered active service in March 1997. In 1998, Cheonghaejin salvaged a North Korean Yugo-class submarine. Cheonghaejin also recovered a North Korean semi-submersible vehicle from a depth of 157 m (515 ft). In 2023, the vessel was ordered to recover sections of a rocket fired by North Korea into the Yellow Sea. The rocket lay 75 m (246 ft) deep.
