= INS Nistar (1969) =

Submarine rescue vessel

INS Nistar was a submarine rescue vessel of the Indian Navy. She was bought from the reserve stocks of the USSR in 1969 and later commissioned by the Indian Navy in 1971. The ship, having a displacement of 800 tonnes, was capable of rescuing the crew of a disabled submarine from severe depths, using a "rescue bell", by the dry escape method, which avoided problems associated with decompression.

Nistar was deployed during the India–Pakistan war of 1971 to locate the sunken Pakistan Navy submarine, PNS Ghazi, off the port of Vizag.

Nistar was decommissioned on 3 November 1989. Some of her equipment, such as the diving bell, were later bequeathed to the diving tender INS Nireekshak.
