= JS Chihaya =

Submarine rescue ship Chihaya

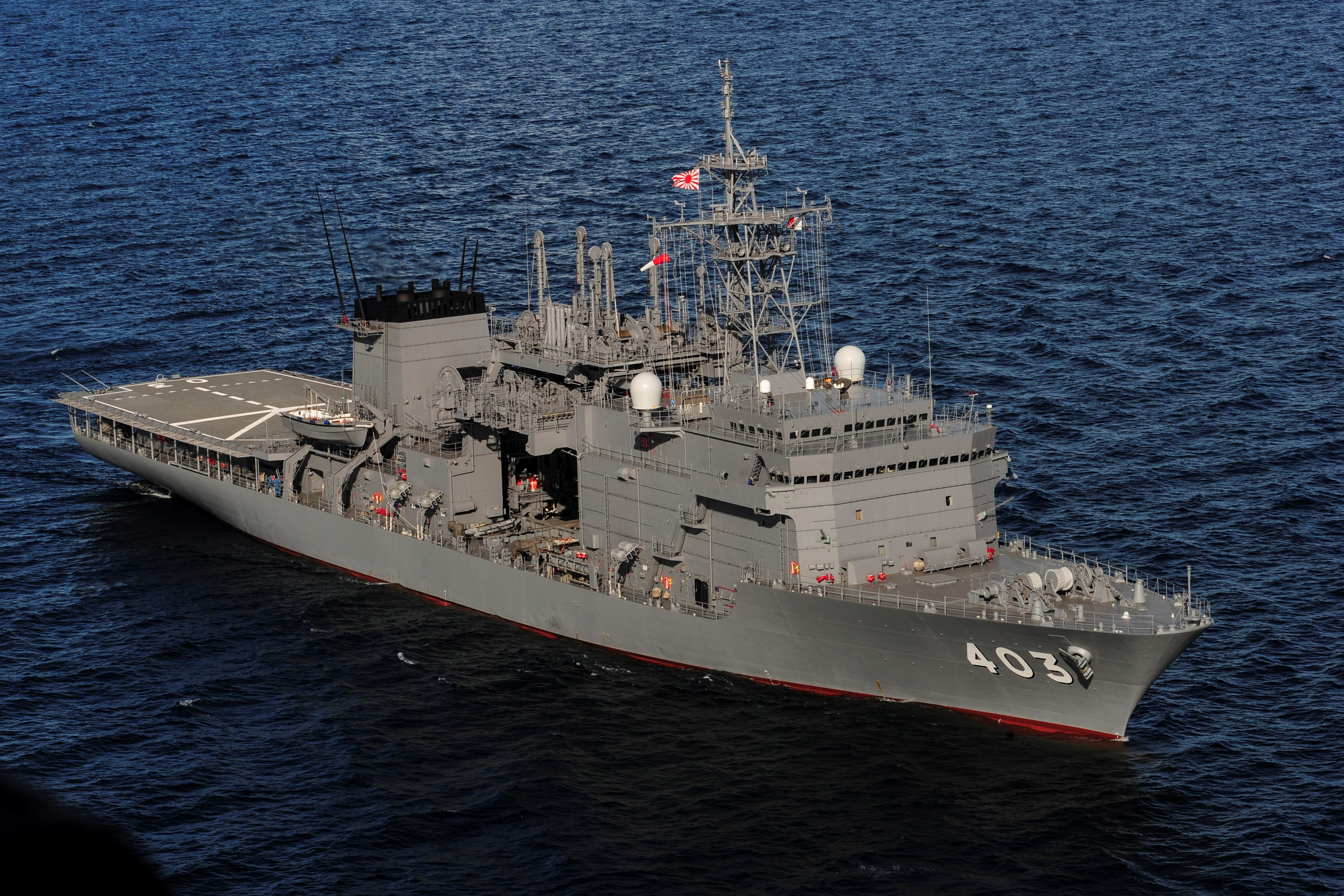
- JS Chihaya on 9 September 2019

Class overview
- Preceded by: Chiyoda class (1983)
- Succeeded by: Chiyoda class (2016)

History

Japan
- Name: Chihaya; (ちはや)
- Namesake: Chihaya
- Ordered: 1996
- Builder: Mitsui, Tamano
- Laid down: 13 October 1997
- Launched: 8 October 1998
- Commissioned: 17 March 2000
- Home port: Kure
- Identification: MMSI number: 431999637; Callsign: JSLT; Pennant number: ASR-403
- Status: Active

General characteristics
- Type: Submarine rescue ship
- Displacement: 5,540–6,900 long tons (5,629–7,011 t) full load
- Length: 128.0 m (419 ft 11 in)
- Beam: 20.0 m (65 ft 7 in)
- Draught: 9.0 m (29 ft 6 in)
- Depth: 5.1 m (16 ft 9 in)
- Propulsion: 2 × diesel engines (16,000 hp, 12,000 kW)
- Speed: 21 knots (39 km/h; 24 mph)
- Range: 6,000 nmi (11,000 km; 6,900 mi) at 13 kn (24 km/h; 15 mph)
- Boats & landing craft carried: 1x deep-submergence rescue vehicle (DSRV); 2 x 11 m (36 ft) boats; 1 x unmanned underwater vehicle (ROV); 1 x deep sea submersible (DDS)
- Complement: 125
- Sensors & processing systems: 2 x sonar; AN/SQQ-25 (J); AN/SQS-36D (J); Atmospheric pressure diving device; Automatic ship position holding device (DPS)
- Aviation facilities: Helipad

JS Chihaya (ASR-403) is a submarine rescue ship of Japan Maritime Self-Defense Force.

== Development and design ==
She was built as a replacement for the dilapidated JDS Fushimi. In terms of design, it is said to be an expanded and improved version of the submarine rescue mother ship JS Chiyoda, and while abolishing the submarine mother ship function, it is strengthening medical equipment.

For DSRV operation, the basic configuration of having a moon pool in the center of the hull is the same as the 56AS, but the poop deck has been extended to the vicinity of the bridge structure, and the standard displacement has been increased by 1,800 tons. As a result, the equipment that was previously stored in the exposed part can now be accommodated inside the ship. In addition, attention was paid to high-speed cruising ability so that the vessel can quickly advance to the distress site, a bulbous bow was adopted to reduce wave-making resistance, and a ship bottom closing device was installed at the bottom of the center well. This is a method of opening and closing the closing plate divided into two by hydraulic pressure, and structures such as a sliding type and an inward opening type were examined, but due to the certainty required for the mission of rescue, the double door method by opening outward was adopted.

The main engine is equipped with two Mitsui Engineering & Shipbuilding 12V42M-A diesel engines. This is the same series as the in-line 8-cylinder engine that was the main engine in Chiyoda, but the output was increased by using a V-type 12-cylinder engine. As a propulsion device, in addition to two variable pitch propeller axes, two side thrusters are provided on the bow and stern. Like Chiyoda, they are equipped with a dynamic positioning system (DPS), which allows them to stand still at a point on the ocean.

== Construction and career ==
Chihaya was laid down on 13 October 1997 at Mitsui Engineering and Shipbuilding, Tamano and launched on 8 October 1998. The vessel was commissioned on 17 March 2000.

The government, which received a request from Ehime Prefecture to search for survivors of the Ehime Maru incident that occurred on 10 February 2001, requested the Defense Agency respond. Chihaya began searching in August 2001.

The ship participated in the International Submarine Rescue Training Pacific Reach 2002 held in April 2002. In addition to successful operations despite stormy weather, the DSRV succeeded not only in its originally planned soft mate (arrival at the sunken submarine), but also in its hard mate (opening the hatch, more practical rescue training). At this point, the transport helicopter MH-53E Sea Dragon had succeeded in landing training.

In May 2008, a member of the explosives disposal corps on board set a record of 450 metres (1,480 ft) in depth due to saturated diving, setting the second highest (at that time) record in the world after 534 m (1,752 ft) in France.

In response to the Great East Japan Earthquake caused by the Tohoku-Pacific Ocean Earthquake that occurred on 11 March 2011, the ship was dispatched off Sanriku as part of the disaster relief. Chihaya was engaged in this duty from 26 June to 3 July.

From 13 July 2018, she provided support in response to the flooding in July 2018.
