= USS Greenlet =

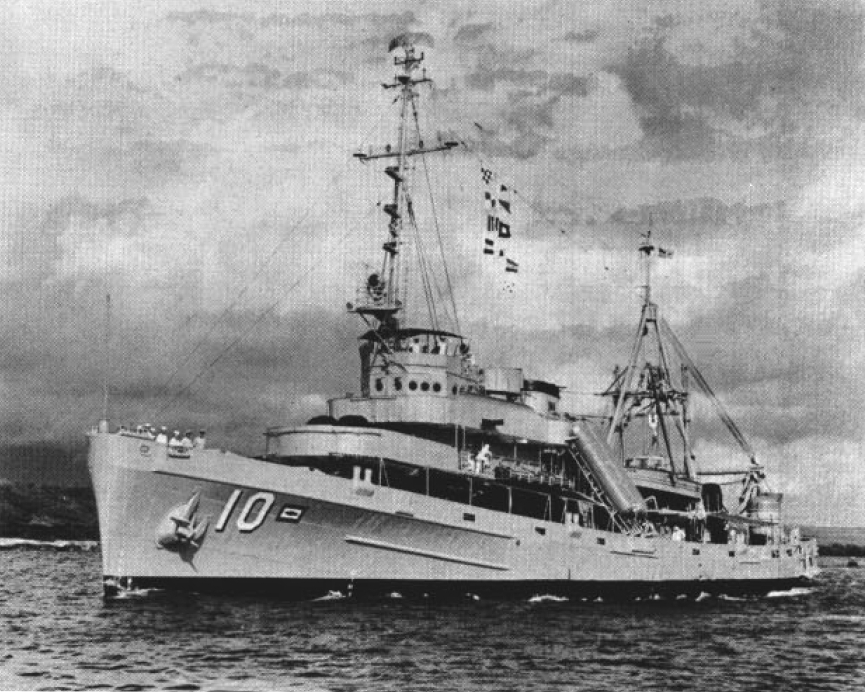
- USS Greenlet leaves Pearl Harbor, Hawaii circa 1963

History

United States
- Name: USS Greenlet
- Laid down: 15 October 1941
- Launched: 12 July 1942
- Commissioned: 29 May 1943
- Decommissioned: 12 June 1970
- Fate: Transferred to Turkey, 12 June 1970

Turkey
- Name: TCG Akin
- Acquired: 12 June 1970
- Decommissioned: 17 November 2017
- Status: decommissioned

General characteristics
- Class & type: Chanticleer-class submarine rescue ship
- Displacement: 2,040 long tons (2,073 t)
- Length: 251 ft 4 in (76.61 m)
- Beam: 42 ft (13 m)
- Draught: 14 ft 10 in (4.52 m)
- Speed: 15 knots (17 mph; 28 km/h)
- Complement: 102 officers and enlisted
- Armament: 2 × 3"/50 caliber guns; 8 × 20 mm guns; 2 × dct

USS Greenlet (ASR-10) was a Chanticleer-class submarine rescue ship in service with the United States Navy from 1943 to 1970. In June 1970, the ship was transferred to the Turkish Navy, renamed TCG Akin (A-585) and remained in service until 2017.

== United States Navy service ==
Greenlet was laid down by Moore Dry Dock & Shipbuilding Co. at their yard in Oakland, California on 15 October 1941. The ship was launched on 12 July 1942, sponsored by Mrs. B. P. Flood. Greenlet was commissioned on 29 May 1943.

=== World War II ===
After shakedown, Greenlet conducted patrol and escort runs out of San Diego, California before sailing for Pearl Harbor, Territory of Hawaii on 24 July. Constructed as a submarine rescue ship, she served at Pearl Harbor and at Midway for more than a year, making escort runs and conducting refresher training for patrol-bound submarines. As the progress of the war advanced steadily across the Pacific, she sailed to Guam on 21 December 1944 to carry out submarine training closer to the patrol areas.

While at Midway and Guam, Greenlet helped train some 215 submarines, among them such boats as USS Tang, USS Tautog, USS Barb, USS Snook, USS Drum, and USS Rasher. Indirectly, she contributed to the sinking of 794 enemy ships, including a battleship and six aircraft carriers. Eleven of the submarines trained by Greenlet were lost during the war, but her charges sank more than 2,797,000 tons of Japanese military and merchant shipping.

As the war in the Pacific drew to a close, Greenlet departed Guam for Japan on 16 August 1945. She reached Sagami Wan, Honshū, on 28 August; entered Tokyo Bay the following day; and was present during the signing of the Japanese surrender on 2 September. After placing buoys over wrecks in the harbor and channel at Tokyo, she stripped and demilitarized Japanese miniature submarines based in Yokosuka harbor. On 1 November she escorted three Japanese fleet submarines to Sasebo and converted them for American crews. Departing Sasebo on 11 December, she escorted former Japanese submarines 1-1.4, I-400, and I-401 to Pearl Harbor, where she arrived via Guam and Eniwetok on 6 January 1946.

After returning to San Francisco, California early in 1946, Greenlet spent the following five years operating primarily out of San Diego where she trained divers and serviced submarines. From September 1946 to May 1947 and from September 1948 to March 1949 she deployed to the Western Pacific (WestPac). Operating from the coast of China to the Philippines, she trained and supported fleet submarines stationed in the Far East.

=== Korea and Vietnam ===
On the outbreak of the Korean War Greenlet departed San Diego for the Far East 6 July 1950. During the next six months she operated out of Yokosuka while providing valuable services to the submarine fleet. Sailing for Pearl Harbor on 6 January 1951, she served there throughout the remainder of the Korean War and continued to provide assistance in the training of submarine crews.

After the Korean Armistice of 1953, Greenlet remained at Pearl Harbor, training divers and submariners, participating in readiness operations, and assisting in servicing and salvaging operations. On 29 May 1958 she unsuccessfully attempted to keep the submarine USS Stickleback afloat after its being rammed during exercises off Oahu, Hawaii.

Between 1953 and 1970 Greenlet made ten deployments to the Western Pacific. Operating from Japan and Okinawa to the Philippines and Australia, she rendered training and repair services to submarines, trained divers, and participated in naval mine recovery and submarine rescue and salvage exercises. During rescue training duty on 6 January 1964, she sent her submarine rescue chamber to a depth of 942 feet (287 m) off the coast of Japan.

In 1965 she took charge of rescuing the destroyer USS Frank Knox. The destroyer had run aground on to Pratas Reef. A severe storm followed that further anchored the ship to the reef. It took Greenlet, with her divers, and fleet tugs about 40 days to pull the destroyer off the reef. Frank Knox was then towed to a dry dock in Yokosuka, Japan for repairs. Greenlet crew members were assigned to assist on repairs.

During Greenlet's final deployment to WestPac in 1969–1970, she was ordered to the Gulf of Tonkin to salvage a Grumman C-2 aircraft that has crashed with 26 persons on board and sunk in 290 feet (88 m) of water. Greenlet assumed command of salvage operations on 22 October until 19 November. After 47 dives the salvage operations was terminated due to deteriorating weather. Greenlet was awarded a Meritorious Unit Commendation (MUC) and the Vietnam Service Medal for the Fall and Winter Campaigns of 1969.

The citation for the MUC reads in part, "For meritorious service from 11 October to 14 April 1970 while serving with the SEVENTH Fleet as the ready Submarine Rescue Ship and Deep-Diving Platform for deep salvage and recovery operations. Faced with extremely harsh climatic conditions and round-the-clock diving and recovery operation, USS Greenlet served as Commander Task Force 73.4.9 in the aircraft search and recovery salvage operation in the Gulf of Tonkin to locate and salvage a downed C2-A aircraft. This operation was terminated by Commander SEVENTH Fleet due to the untenable area hazards caused by continued and pronounced weather deterioration. During the entire operation, Greenlet remained aggressively active in an exemplary attempt to succeed against overpowering elements." Signed for the Secretary of the Navy by E. R. Zumwalt, Admiral, USN, Chief of Naval Operations

== Transfer to Turkish Navy ==
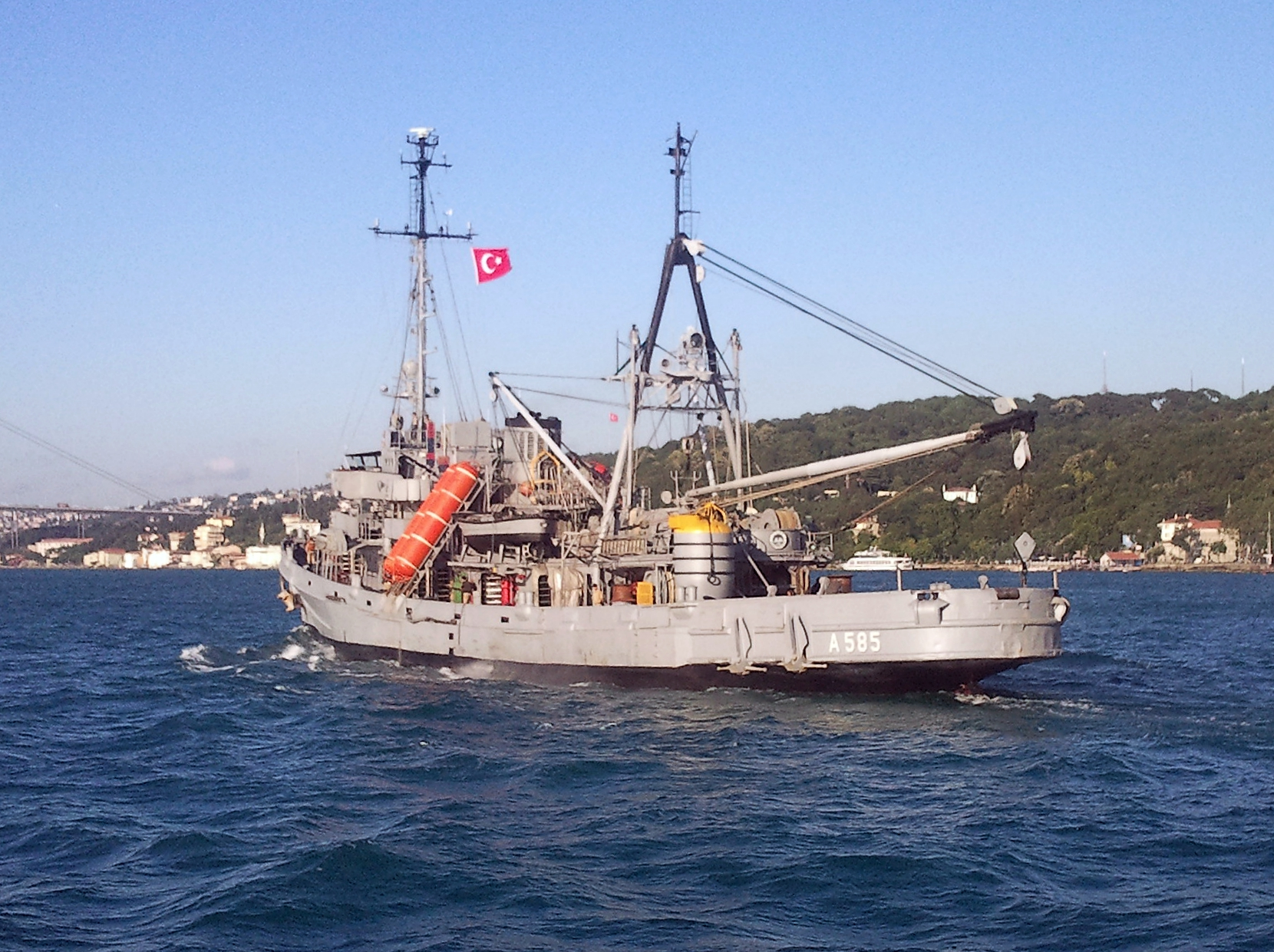
TCG Akın (A-585) in Bosphorus Strait, 2012

At Pearl Harbor Naval Submarine Base on 12 June 1970, Greenlet was decommissioned and transferred to the Republic of Turkey for commissioning as TCG Akin (A-585), Commander Necdet Donertas, Commanding Officer. After 47 years active service in the Turkish Navy, Akin was decommissioned on 17 November 2017 at Istanbul Naval Shipyard.
