= USS Skylark (ASR-20) =

Penguin-class submarine rescue ship

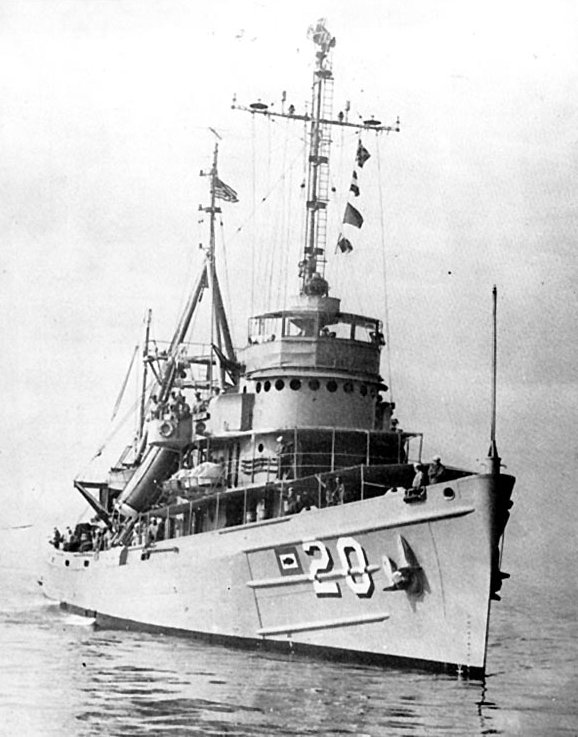
- USS Skylark

History

United States
- Name: USS Skylark
- Namesake: Skylark
- Builder: Charleston Shipbuilding & Drydock Company, Charleston, South Carolina
- Laid down: July 1945
- Launched: 19 March 1946
- Sponsored by: Mrs. H. C. Weatherly
- Commissioned: 1 March 1951
- Decommissioned: 30 June 1973
- Renamed: Skylark, 5 December 1945
- Reclassified: Submarine rescue ship, 11 October 1945; ASR-20, 13 November 1945
- Stricken: 30 June 1973
- Fate: Sold to Brazil, 30 June 1973

History

Brazil
- Name: Gastão Moutinho (K10)
- Acquired: 30 June 1973
- Reclassified: U20 (auxiliary ship), 1989
- Decommissioned: 18 September 1996
- Fate: Unknown

General characteristics
- Class & type: Penguin-class submarine rescue ship
- Displacement: 1,735 long tons (1,763 t) full
- Length: 205 ft (62 m)
- Beam: 39 ft 3 in (11.96 m)
- Draft: 15 ft 6 in (4.72 m)
- Propulsion: 4 × General Motors 12-278A diesel engines driving four General Electric generators; 3 × General Motors 3-268A auxiliary service engines; Single screw; 3,600 shp (2,685 kW)
- Speed: 16 knots (30 km/h; 18 mph)
- Complement: 106 officers and enlisted
- Armament: 1 × 3"/50 caliber gun; 4 × 20 mm guns; 2 × Depth charge tracks

USS Skylark (ASR-20) was a Penguin-class submarine rescue ship of the United States Navy.

The ship was laid down in July 1945 as the Navajo-class fleet tug Yustaga (ATF-165) by the Charleston Shipbuilding & Drydock Co. of Charleston, South Carolina. While under construction Yustaga was redesignated a submarine rescue ship on 11 October 1945, assigned the hull designation ASR-20 on 13 November 1945, and renamed Skylark on 5 December 1945. She was launched on 19 March 1946, sponsored by Mrs. H. C. Weatherly, and was placed in the Atlantic Reserve Fleet, berthed first at Charleston and later at New London, Connecticut, until 1 March 1951, when she was finally commissioned.

== Service history ==
=== 1951–1962 ===
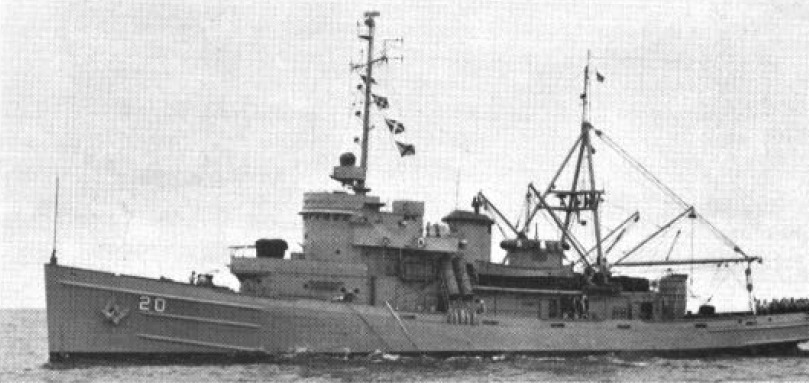
Skylark in the early 1950s.

Following restricted availability at the Portsmouth Navy Yard, Skylark conducted her shakedown cruise and training out of Norfolk, Virginia, during July. The ship then returned to New London and operated out of that base, practicing submarine rescues and serving as a target recovery ship for submarines conducting torpedo-firing drills. In April 1952, the ship temporarily moved south to relieve Petrel (ASR-14) as rescue vessel at Key West, Florida, while the latter ship underwent an overhaul. In June, she returned north to New London to resume her former duties. During January and February 1953, Skylark was overhauled at the Philadelphia Naval Shipyard; and, after refresher training at Newport, Rhode Island, during March and April, she spent May at Norfolk filling in for Kittiwake (ASR-13) while the latter ship went into the shipyard for overhaul. In June, she returned to New London and carried out her training schedule until October when she again headed back to Norfolk to substitute for Kittiwake, while the latter participated in "Operation Springboard." Upon the conclusion of that brief assignment, she resumed her New London-based routine. In February and March 1954, Skylark engaged in her own share of "Operation Springboard" exercises, providing services to Atlantic Fleet submarines during the annual training evolution. She returned to New London late in March and resumed her usual duties. In September, the ship entered the Boston Naval Shipyard for a two-month overhaul.

Until the beginning of 1962, Skylark continued the pattern of duties described above. She operated out of New London the majority of the time but, periodically, did temporary duty elsewhere, notably at Norfolk and Key West, taking over briefly the duties of Kittiwake or Petrel when either ship was incapacitated due to repairs. She also operated regularly in the West Indies during the annual "Springboard" exercises. The one notable exception to that pattern occurred in January and February 1955 when she assisted Nautilus (SSN-571), the Navy's first nuclear-powered submarine, in completing her builders' trials.

=== 1962–1973 ===
At the beginning of 1962, Skylark began a new phase of her career when regular deployments to the 6th Fleet in the Mediterranean became a normal aspect of her activities and continued to be for the remainder of her naval service. She embarked upon the first such cruise on 8 January 1962. During that assignment, she served as flagship of Task Force (TF) 69 and participated in the search for an Air Force jet fighter which crashed at sea near Málaga, Spain. On 7 May 1962, she returned to New London and resumed her duties with the Atlantic Fleet. In April 1963, she was working closely with the Thresher (SSN-593) when the submarine sank during diving tests, and Skylark issued the first distress call following the incident. Skylark also participated in the search for the submarine which was conducted for several days after the loss. In July 1963, she was deployed to the Mediterranean once more and again served as flagship of TF 69. That cruise lasted until late October, and Skylark re-entered New London on 2 November. Nineteen months of duty out of her home port, along the Atlantic coast of the United States, followed her return home.

On 7 July 1965, the submarine rescue vessel stood out of New London once more, bound for the Mediterranean and duty in support of 6th Fleet submarines. During the latter portion of that cruise, Skylark served for several weeks at the ballistic missile submarine base located in Holy Loch, Scotland, before returning home to New London on 29 October. During the remaining eight years of her Navy career, the ship alternated duty along the Atlantic coast of the United States with deployments to the Mediterranean and to the submarine base at Holy Loch.

In the spring of 1968, she participated in the unsuccessful rescue attempt and search for Scorpion (SSN-589), the second American nuclear-powered submarine to be lost at sea.

During the period 1970-1972, Skylark, under command of LCDR A.J. Smith, participated in many experimental test operations, including towing and escorting deep-diving research nuclear submarine NR-1, and in 1971 the feasibility of towing submerged fast attack nuclear submarines with a 3-inch nylon hawser and the further feasibility of using a quick-release mechanism on the bow of the submarine while the tow was in progress, tested as a method of taking a submarine to a designated position through possible hostile waters without detection of a submarine not under her own power.

Her only other major departure from her routine came in June 1972 when she participated in NATO Exercise "Pink Lace" before beginning a scheduled deployment to Holy Loch and the Mediterranean in July. That deployment in the summer and fall of 1972 saw Skaylark deploy with the submarine tender USS Fulton, and virtually the entire Submarine Squadron 10 for which Fulton served as flagship. During the early part of the deployment, Skylark performed operational exercises with both U.S. and U.K. boats out of Faslane, Scotland, and researched alternate egress possibilities from Holy Loch into the North Sea. In the Mediterranean, she participated in the founding of the NATO naval base in La Madellena, Italy, where she, Fulton and members of Submarine Squadron 10 created a permanent mid-Mediterranean base of operations. Skylark also performed joint submarine rescue practice four-point moor operations with an Italian Navy ASR out of Sicily. She returned to New London on 18 November 1972, completing the last deployment of her career.

Skylark received the Meritorious Unit Commendation for the period 1 March 1971 to 1 December 1972.

=== Decommissioning and sale ===
On 30 June 1973, Skylark was decommissioned, and her name was struck from the Navy List. On that same day, she was sold to Brazil through the Security Assistance Program (SAP).

=== In Brazilian service, 1973–1996 ===
Skylark was commissioned into the Brazilian Navy as Gastao Moutinho (K.10) in 1973.

In 1989, Gastão Moutinho was reclassified as an auxiliary ship, and redesignated U.20. Based at the naval base of Aratu, it was placed under the control of the Commandant of the 2nd Naval District, carrying out coastal patrols, supporting other ships, and restocking the radio beacon of Abrolhos, amongst other missions. On 18 September 1996, Gastão Moutinho was deactivated, having sailed 175,822 nautical miles (325,622 km) and spent 1,626 days at sea during her service in the Brazilian Navy.

== Awards ==
- Meritorious Unit Commendation
- National Defense Service Medal (two awards)
