= JS Chiyoda (1983) =

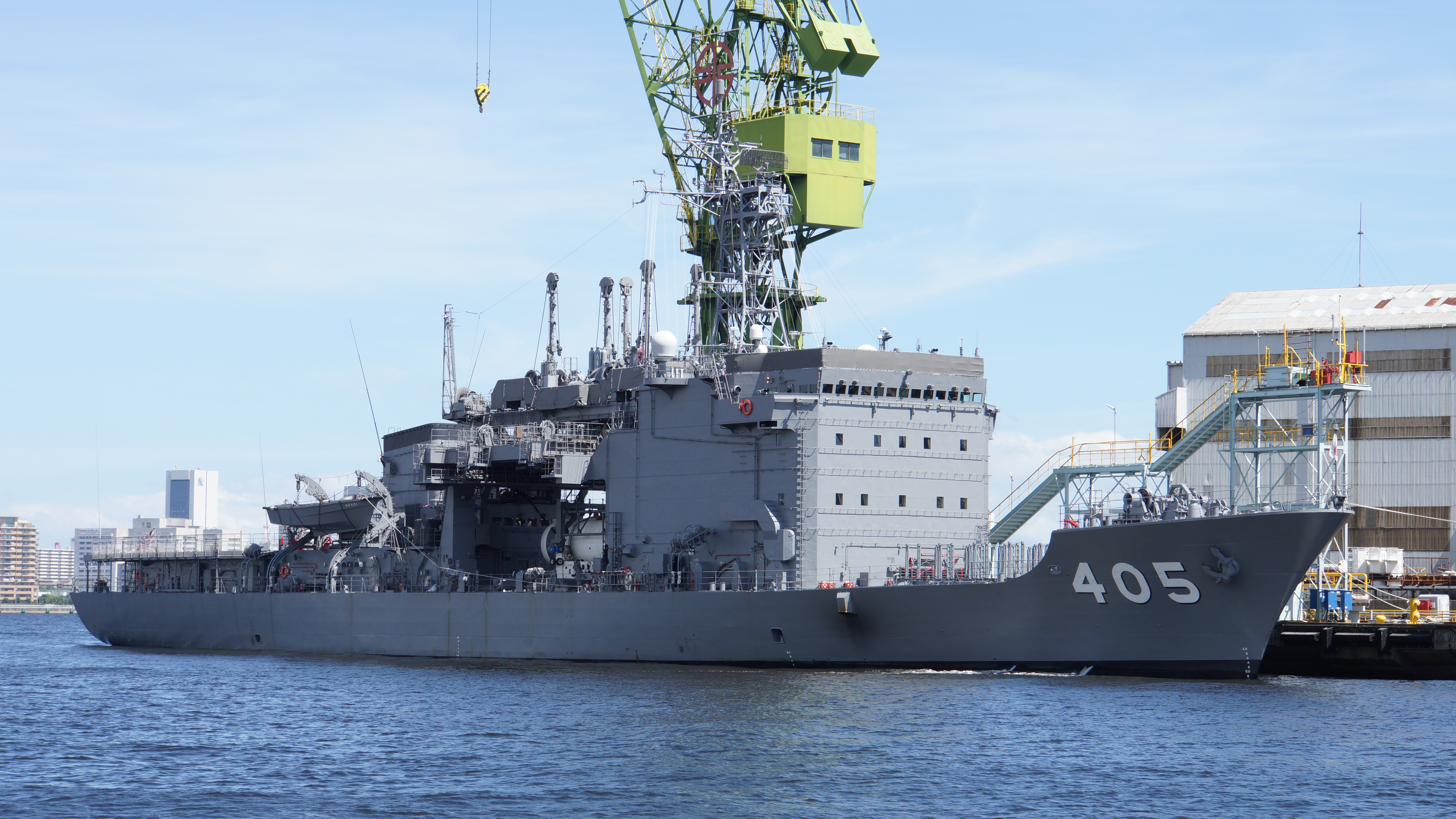
- JS Chiyoda at Kobe on 25 July 2015

History

Japan
- Name: Chiyoda; (ちよだ)
- Builder: Mitsui, Tamado
- Laid down: January 19, 1983
- Launched: December 7, 1983
- Commissioned: March 27, 1985
- Decommissioned: March 20, 2018

Class overview
- Preceded by: Fushimi class
- Succeeded by: Chihaya class (1998)

General characteristics
- Displacement: 3,650 long tons (3,710 t) standard 4,450 long tons (4,520 t) full load
- Length: 113 m (370.7 ft)
- Beam: 17.6 m (57.7 ft)
- Draft: 4.6 m (15.1 ft)
- Propulsion: 2× Mitsui 8L42M diesels 7,860 kW (10,540 hp) 2 shafts
- Speed: 17 kn (20 mph; 31 km/h)
- Complement: 120
- Aviation facilities: Helicopter deck
- Notes: Carried one DSRV

JS Chiyoda (AS 405) was a submarine rescue ship of the Japan Maritime Self-Defense Force.

She was replaced by a newer ship of the same name, with a slightly different designation: JS Chiyoda (ASR 404). The new ship is similar, but improved, at: 128 m (420 ft) long, with a standard displacement of 5,600 tonnes (6,173 tons), and was commissioned on March 20, 2018.

== History ==
Chiyoda was built by Mitsui Engineering & Shipbuilding in Tamano. She was laid down on January 19, 1983, and launched later that year on December 7, 1983. The Chiyoda was a multipurpose submarine rescue and saturation-diving capable ship belonging to the Japan Maritime Self-Defense Force (JMSDF). Built in 1985, it served as the mother ship for the sole deep submergence rescue vessel (DSRV) in JMSDF.

The design of the JS Chiyoda served as the basis for the next vessel which was the first ASR ship. However, the submarine support functions present in the JS Chiyoda (AS 405) were no longer built into the follow-on ASR ships.
