= OPS-4 =

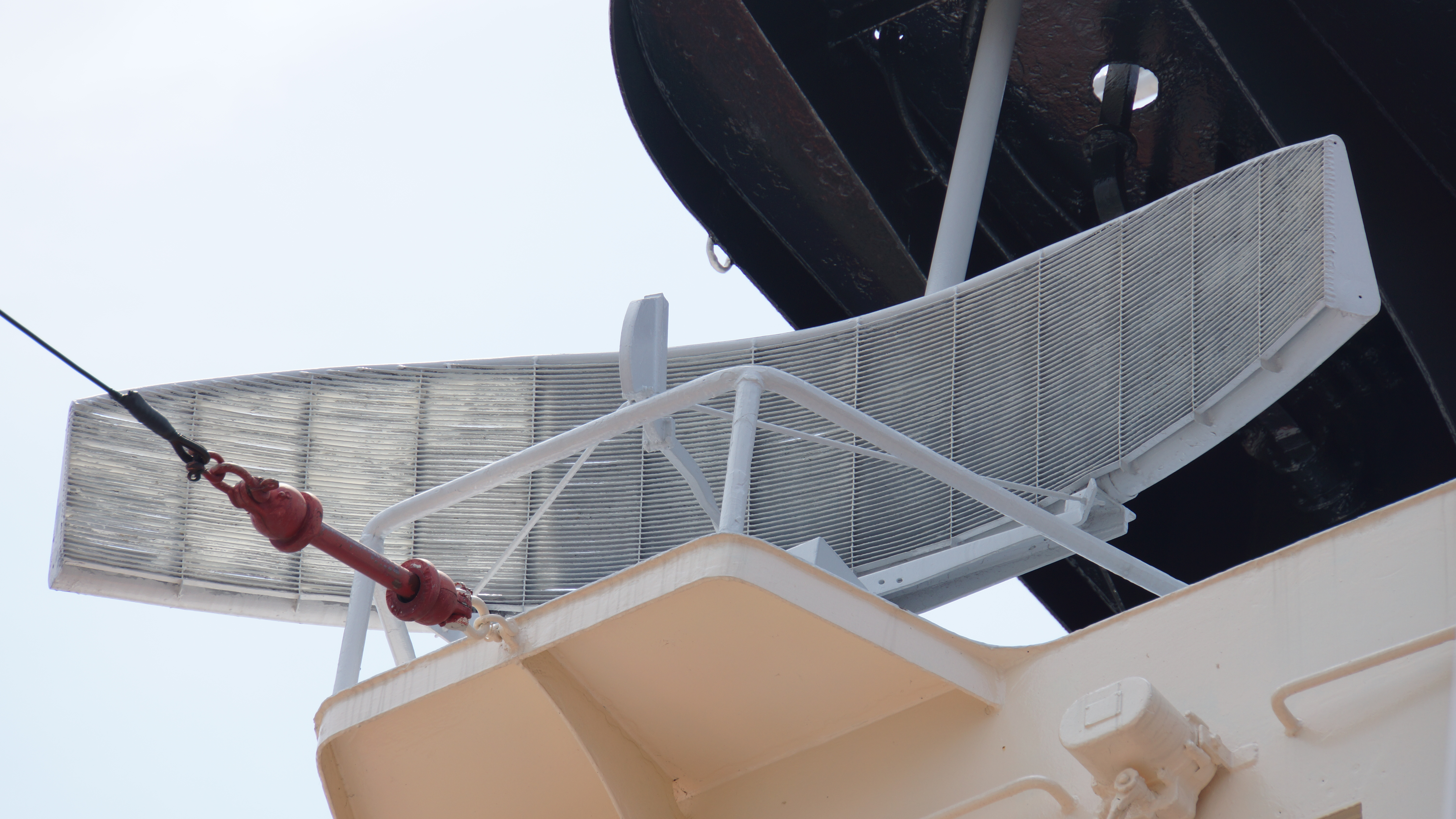
- OPS-4D aboard Fuji
- Country of origin: Japan
- Manufacturer: Oki Electric Industry
- Introduced: 1959
- Type: 2D
- Frequency: X Band
- Azimuth: Unlimited
- Power: 30 kW

OPS-4 is a two-dimensional radar manufactured by Oki Electric Industry. It was installed as surface-search radar on the Maritime Self-Defense Force's self-defense ship.

In the Maritime Self-Defense Force, the S-Band SO-8 was operated in the former Navy auxiliary boat that was in operation in the early days, but the Yashima-class minesweeper provided by the United States in the 1958 plan. The boat) was equipped with an X-band AN/SPS-5B. The first mass-produced medium-sized minesweeper to be subsequently maintained was required to continue to be equipped with a domestic radar that operates in the X-band with short wavelengths and high resolution. This model was developed as a result.

== Overview ==
At that time, the development of the OPS-3 series, which was a domestic version of AN/SPS-5B, was underway, centered on Japan Radio Company (JRC). This was an S-band radar intended to be mounted on escort vessels, etc., but in developing this model, the OPS-6 antenna mount was diverted to reduce the number of parts, and the engraving remained. It is said that Oki Electric used the gantry. The system consists of the following parts.

Radar antenna for ships N-AS-36

Ship radar transmitter / receiver N-RT-22

Radar indicator for ships N-IP-26

Radar true direction indicator for ships N-C-89

OPS-4 was introduced in 1959. After that, higher resolution X-band radar was required. The OPS-9, which was developed in response to this, was put into practical use in 1966 and became the successor to this model.
