= Submarine rescue ship =

Support ship for submarine rescue and deep-sea salvage operations

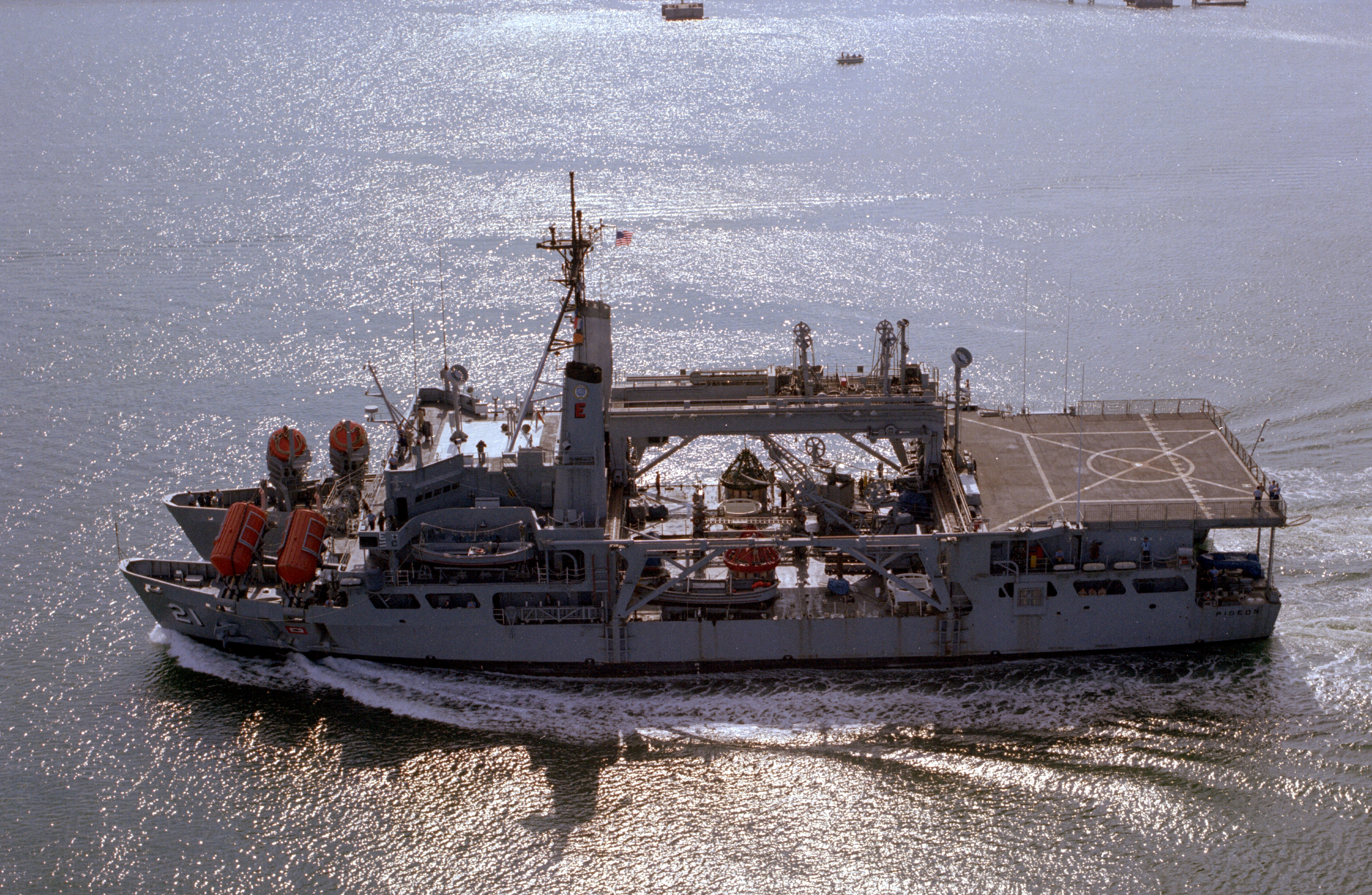
USS Pigeon, submarine rescue ship

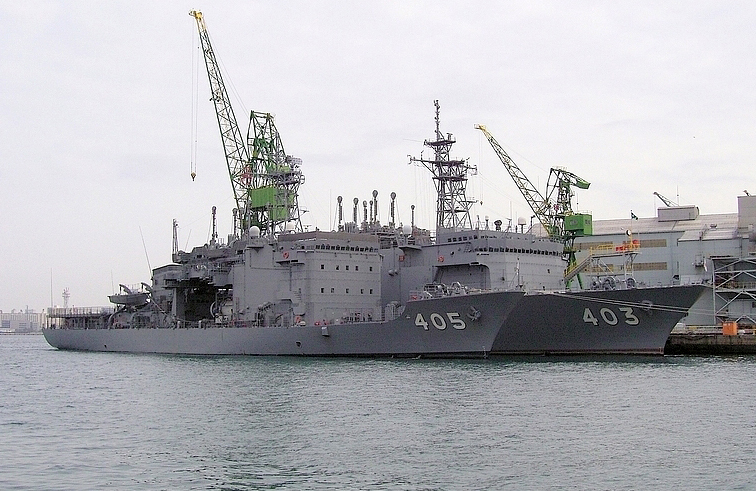
Japan Maritime Self-Defense Force Chiyoda (left) and Chihaya (right)

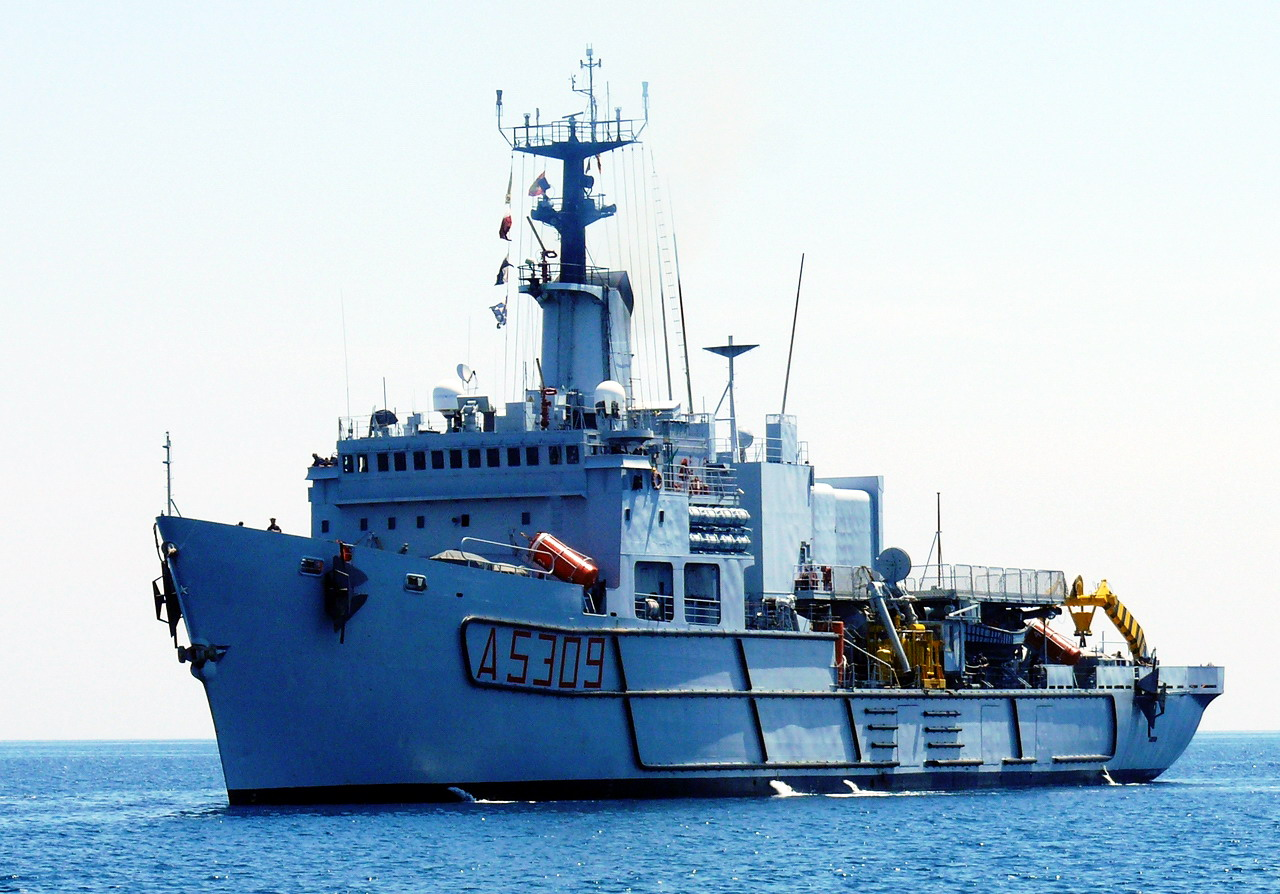
Italian ship Anteo, submarine rescue ship

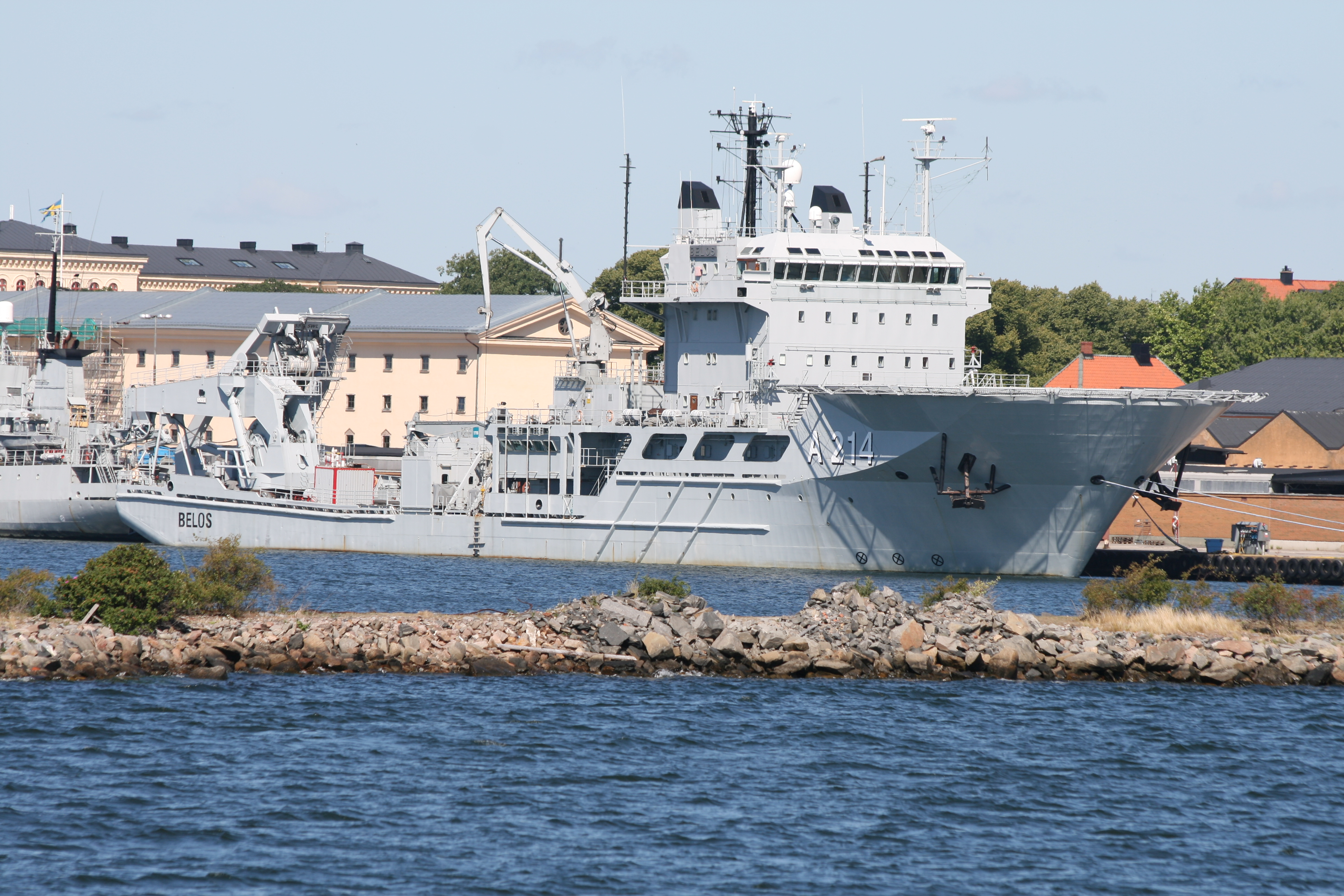
HSwMS Belos (A214) of the Swedish Navy

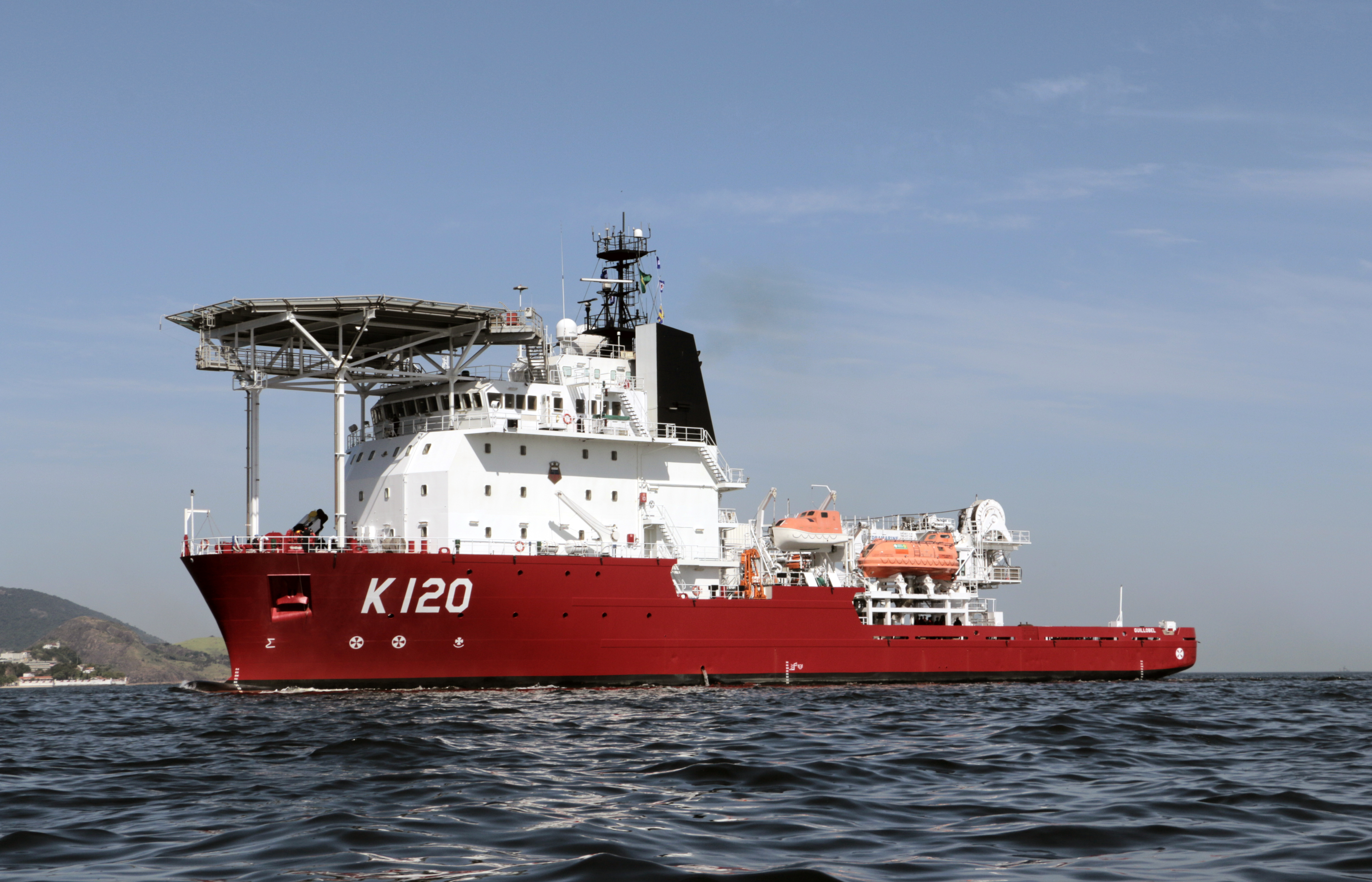
Guillobel of the Brazilian Navy

A submarine rescue ship is a surface support ship for submarine rescue and deep-sea salvage operations. Methods employed include the McCann Rescue Chamber, deep-submergence rescue vehicles (DSRV's) and diving operations.

== List of active submarine rescue ships ==
=== Royal Australian Navy ===
- MV Besant
- MV Stoker

=== Brazilian Navy ===
- Guillobel (K120)

=== Chinese Navy ===
- Dajiang class
- Dalao class

=== Indian Navy ===
- Nistar-class diving support vessel

=== Italian Navy ===
- Italian ship Anteo (A5309)

=== Japan Maritime Self-Defense Force ===
- JS Chihaya (ASR-403)
- JS Chiyoda (ASR-404)

=== Royal Malaysian Navy ===
- MV Mega Bakti

=== Republic of Singapore Navy ===
- MV Swift Rescue

=== South Korean Navy ===
- ROKS Cheonghaejin (ASR 21)

=== Spanish Navy ===
- Neptuno (A-20) (to be replaced in 2024 by the BAM-IS 45)

=== Royal Swedish Navy ===
- HSwMS Belos (A214)

=== Russian Navy ===
- Kommuna

=== Turkish Navy ===
- TCG Alemdar (A-582)

=== Vietnam People's Navy ===
- Yết Kiêu (927)

== List of decommissioned submarine rescue ships ==
=== Indian Navy ===
- INS Nistar

=== Japan Maritime Self-Defense Force ===
- JDS Chihaya (ASR-401) (Retired)
- JDS Fushimi (ASR-402) (Retired)
- JS Chiyoda (AS-405) (Retired)

=== Spanish Navy ===
- Kanguro (Retired in 1943)
- Poseidón (A-12) (Ceded to Mauritania in 2000. Sunk in 2011)

=== United States Navy ===
- USS Widgeon (ASR-1)
- USS Falcon (ASR-2)
- USS Chewink (ASR-3)
- USS Mallard (ASR-4)
- USS Ortolan (ASR-5)
- USS Pigeon (ASR-6)
- USS Chanticleer (ASR-7)
- USS Coucal (ASR-8)
- USS Florikan (ASR-9)
- USS Greenlet (ASR-10)
- USS Macaw (ASR-11)
- USS Penguin (ASR–12)
- USS Kittiwake (ASR-13)
- USS Petrel (ASR-14)
- USS Sunbird (ASR-15)
- USS Tringa (ASR-16)
- USS Verdin (ASR-17) – cancelled in 1945
- USS Windhover (ASR-18) – cancelled in 1945
- USS Bluebird (ASR-19)
- USS Skylark (ASR-20)
- USS Pigeon (ASR-21)
- USS Ortolan (ASR-22)

== See also ==
- India-class submarine – Underwater rescue submarine class
- Mystic-class deep-submergence rescue vehicle
- Submarine tender – ship designed to support and resupply submarines
