= USS Bluebird (ASR-19) =

Penguin-class submarine rescue ship

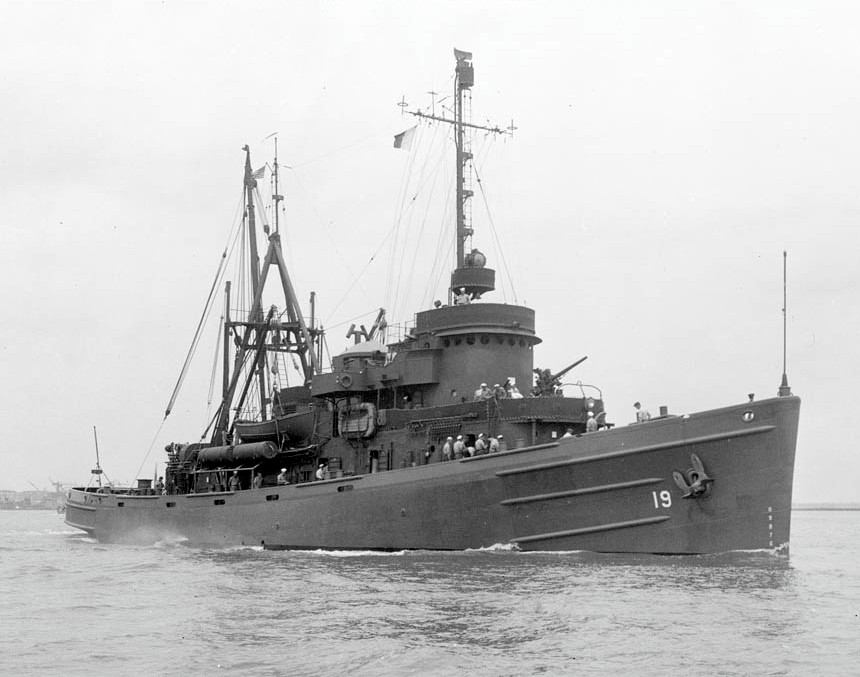
- Bluebird underway

History

United States
- Laid down: 23 June 1945
- Launched: 15 February 1946
- Commissioned: 28 May 1946
- Decommissioned: 15 August 1950
- Stricken: 26 September 1950
- Fate: Transferred to Turkish Navy 1950

Turkey
- Name: TCG Kurtaran
- Acquired: 15 August 1950
- Fate: Torpedoed and sunk during a training exercise on 15 September 2000

General characteristics
- Displacement: 1780 tons
- Length: 251 ft 4 in (76.61 m)
- Draught: 14 ft 3 in (4.34 m)
- Speed: 16 kts
- Complement: 102 officers and enlisted
- Armament: 2 x 3 in (76 mm)/50 guns

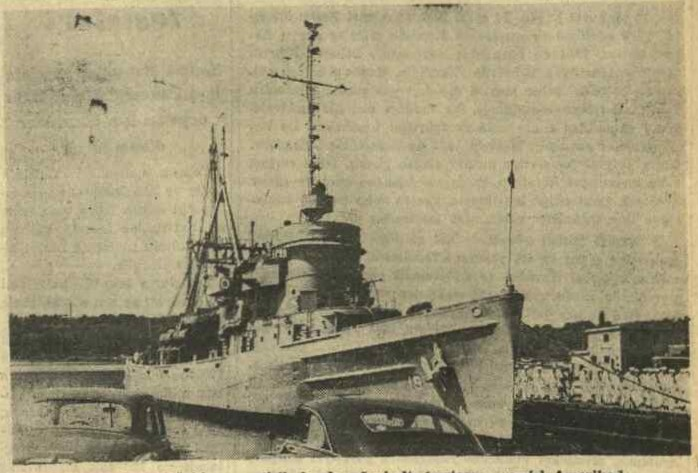
USS Bluebird ASR-19 at the Neow Submarine Base

The second USS Bluebird (ASR-19) was a Penguin-class submarine rescue ship in the United States Navy.

Bluebird was laid down on 23 June 1945 at Charleston, South Carolina, by the Charleston Shipbuilding & Drydock Co. as the fleet ocean tug Yurok (ATF-164). It was redesignated as the submarine rescue ship ASR-19 on 7 November 1945, and renamed Bluebird on 3 December 1945. Bluebird was launched on 15 February 1946, sponsored by Mrs. Paul Lambert Borden, and commissioned at the Charleston Naval Shipyard on 28 May 1946.

Bluebird reported to the Commander, Training Group, Atlantic Fleet, in mid-July and completed shakedown training in Chesapeake Bay. After post-shakedown repairs at Charleston, the submarine rescue vessel reported for duty with the Submarine Force, Atlantic Fleet on 28 August. On the following day, however, she departed Charleston under orders to join Submarine Squadron (SubRon) 5, Pacific Fleet. She transited the Panama Canal on 5 September and, on the 7th, resumed her voyage to Pearl Harbor in company with USS Tawakoni (ATF-114), USS Cahuilla (ATF-152) and two tows. The ship arrived in Pearl Harbor on 12 October and relieved USS Widgeon (AM-22) as rescue vessel for SubRon 5. Bluebird remained at Pearl Harbor for the next six months inspecting rescue and salvage equipment on board SubRon 5 submarines and assisting them in training missions.

On 29 April 1947, she departed Pearl Harbor for the Far East. The ship arrived in Yokosuka, Japan, on 10 May but departed there again the following day. On 14 May, she arrived in Tsingtao, China, and relieved USS Greenlet (ASR-10). For the next four months, Bluebird conducted rescue and salvage training with submarines at Tsingtao. On 12 October 1947, she departed that port to return to Hawaii. The submarine rescue vessel reentered Pearl Harbor on 3 November 1941 and began overhaul at the Pearl Harbor Naval Shipyard soon thereafter. The ship completed repairs in April 1948 and resumed duty with Pearl Harbor-based submarines. On 16 May 1949, she stood out of Pearl Harbor in company with USS Queenfish (SS-393) en route to the western Pacific. The two ships conducted exercises along the way before arriving in Yokosuka, Japan, on 20 June 1949. The submarine rescue vessel operated in the Orient exercising with submarines and destroyers until the following November. She visited such ports as Hong Kong, Guam in the Marianas and Subic Bay in the Philippines. On 25 July 1949, she assisted SS John C. Fremont, which ship had gone aground off Mayango Island. The next month between the 9th and the 10th, Bluebird towed the disabled USNS Cache (T-AO-67) into Yokosuka.

On 29 November, she departed Hong Kong in company with USS Sea Fox (SS-402) to return to Hawaii. The two ships conducted exercises along the way and made a stop at Midway Island before reentering Pearl Harbor on 13 December. After overhaul, she resumed active duty in March 1950 with Submarine Division (SubDiv) 12. She operated with submarines and trained divers until 20 May, at which time she left Oahu for the east coast of the United States. Steaming via the Panama Canal and San Juan, Puerto Rico, the submarine rescue vessel arrived in New London, Connecticut, on 16 June 1950.

== Turkish Navy ==
Assigned to duty with SubRon 8, she conducted training for the Turkish crew that would take her over later that summer. Bluebird was decommissioned on 15 August 1950 and simultaneously transferred to the Turkish Navy. She was commissioned in that navy as Kurtaran with the designation A-584. Her name was struck from the U.S. Navy list on 26 September 1950.
