= USS Chanticleer (ASR-7) =

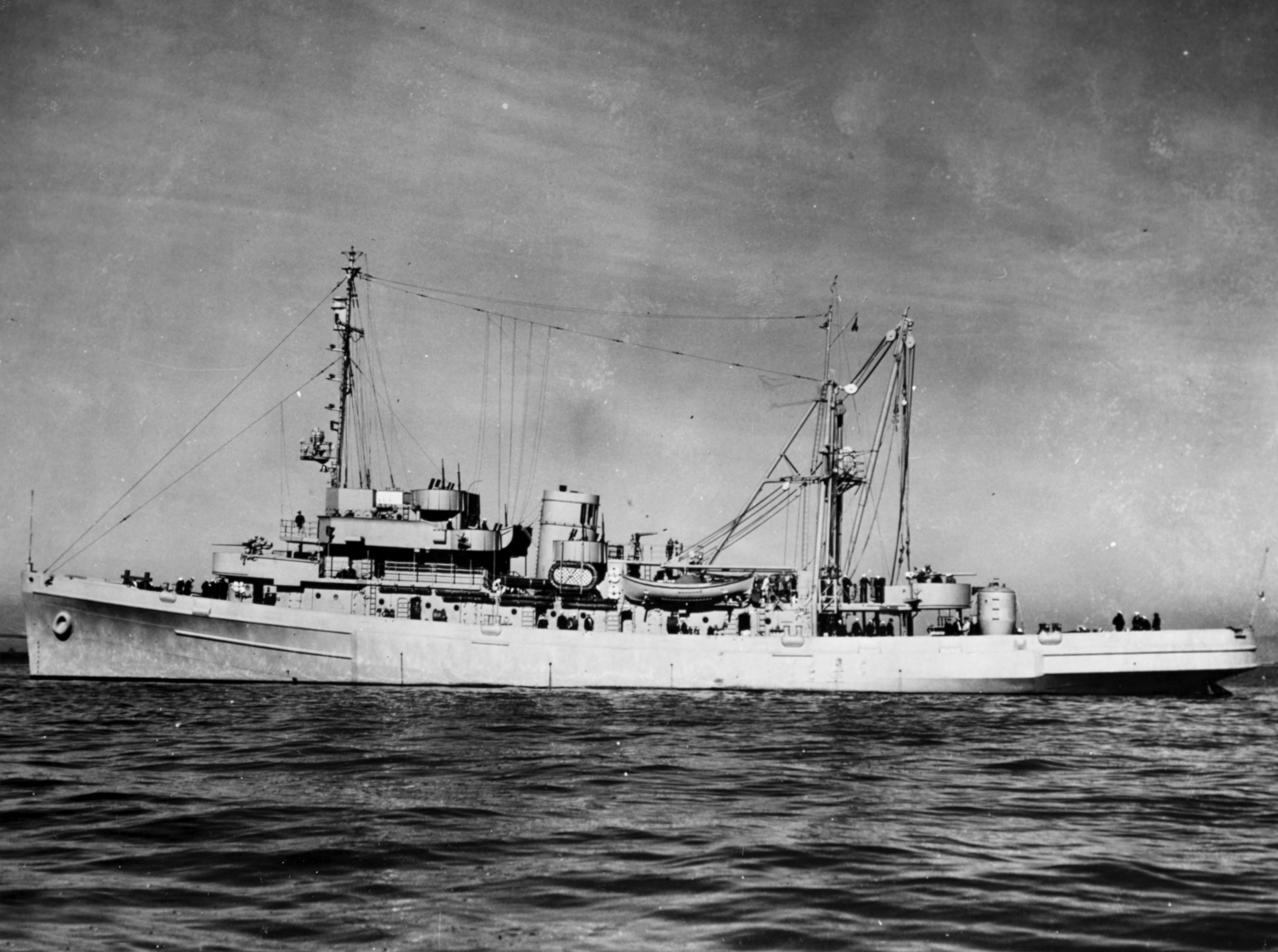
- Chanticleer in 1942

History

United States
- Name: USS Chanticleer
- Builder: Moore Dry Dock Company
- Launched: 29 May 1942
- Commissioned: 20 November 1942
- Stricken: 1 June 1973
- Fate: Sold for scrap, 1 June 1974
- Notes: "The Fighting Cock"

General characteristics
- Class & type: Chanticleer-class submarine rescue ship
- Displacement: 1,780 long tons (1,809 t)
- Length: 251 ft 4 in (76.61 m)
- Draught: 14 ft 3 in (4.34 m)
- Speed: 16 knots (18 mph; 30 km/h)
- Complement: 102 officers and enlisted
- Armament: 2 × 3-inch/50-caliber guns

USS Chanticleer (ASR-7) was the lead ship of her class of submarine rescue ships in the United States Navy. She served from 1942 to 1973 and was scrapped in 1974.

== History ==
Chanticleer was launched 29 May 1942 by Moore Shipbuilding and Drydock Co., Oakland, California; sponsored by Mrs. W. K. Kilpatrick; commissioned 20 November 1942 and reported to the Pacific Fleet.

Calling en route at Pearl Harbor, island bases, and Australian ports, Chanticleer arrived at Fremantle, Western Australia, 8 May 1943. With her primary assignment the support of the submarines based at Fremantle, Chanticleer provided tender services to the submarines as they came in to refit between war patrols, trained divers, cared for small craft, repaired anti-torpedo nets, and carried out salvage operations. In October 1944, Chanticleer moved north to provide similar services at Port Darwin, Australia, returning to Fremantle in January 1945. In the Darwin service "Chanticleer" provided valuable service in Dec 1944 by towing the captured Chinese junk "Bandoeng" to Prize Court Fremantle, Australia arriving on 15 January 1945. The "Bandoeng" was handed over to Intelligence gathering agencies and subsequently fitted with a Hercules diesel engine. To supplement her ALCO539 Diesel engines.

Chanticleer arrived in Subic Bay, Luzon, Philippines from 19 March 1945 to take part in the enormous task of clearing Philippine waters by salvaging United States and Japanese ships, and locating sunken vessels which hazarded navigation. A voyage to Fremantle for salvage operations in September was followed by a resumption of her Philippine duty until January 1946, when she cleared for the east coast of the United States.

Arriving at Key West, Florida, 18 February 1946, Chanticleer operated to Cuba, and along the east coast until June 1950, when she was transferred to the Pacific Fleet. Homeported at San Diego, she alternated local operations and exercises with tours of duty in the Far East at intervals of about a year. In the Far East, she sailed with the 7th Fleet, 1969 she was fitted with twin 20mm gun mounts port and starboard aft of the bridge following capture of USS Pueblo. She was involved in RVN diving ops in Nha Trang in Aug 69 and carried out numerous salvage and diving assignments. This duty continued through 1972.

Chanticleer was struck from the Naval Vessel Register on 1 June 1973 and sold for scrap on 1 June 1974.
