= RV Sir Horace Lamb =

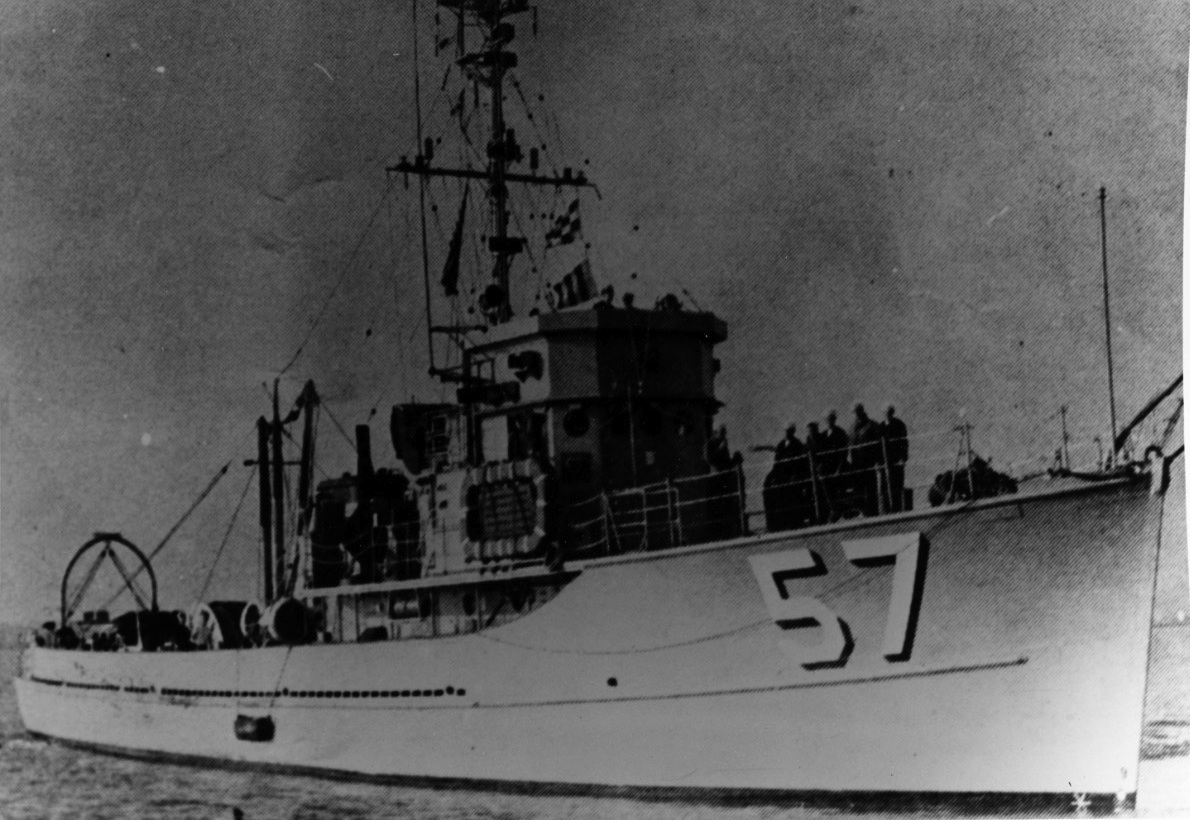
- USS Redpoll (AMS-57)

History

United States
- Name: YMS-294 (1943-1947); Redpoll (1947-1959)
- Namesake: A small finch found in North America, Europe, and Asia.
- Owner: U.S. Navy
- Operator: U.S. Navy (1943-1959)
- Laid down: 10 June 1943
- Launched: 11 August 1943
- Commissioned: 11 September 1943 (Note: The ship was "in service" between 1943 and 1959 operating as a commissioned United States Ship (USS) and "in service" non commissioned status. Dates here reflect only first commissioned status.)
- Decommissioned: 12 November 1946
- Recommissioned: 20 November 1950
- Decommissioned: 8 November 1957
- Stricken: 1 July 1959
- Fate: Converted to acoustic research vessel 1959
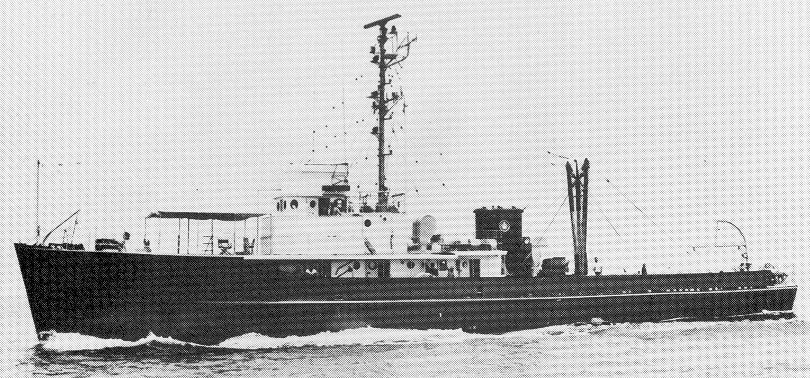
- RV Sir Horace Lamb

History

United States
- Name: Sir Horace Lamb (1959-1976)
- Namesake: Horace Lamb
- Owner: U.S. Navy
- Operator: Columbia University Geophysical Field Station, Bermuda (1959—1976)
- In service: 1959
- Out of service: 1976
- Homeport: St. George's Harbour, St. George's Island, Bermuda
- Fate: Disposed, Navy sale 1 December 1976

General characteristics
- Displacement: 270 tons (mine/training); 320 tons (as RV)
- Length: 136 ft (41 m)
- Beam: 24 ft 6 in (7.47 m)
- Draft: 8 ft (2.4 m); 10 ft (3.0 m) as RV
- Speed: 15 knots
- Complement: As mine/training: 32
- Crew: As RV: 23 crew; 10-12 scientific/technical
- Armament: one 3 in (76 mm) gun mount, two 20 mm machine guns, two depth charge racks, two depth charge tracks (disarmed in conversion to RV)

RV Sir Horace Lamb was a Navy owned former mine warfare vessel assigned to the Columbia University, Geophysical Field Station research facility in Bermuda for acoustic research operating from 1959 to 1976. The ship was the former USS Redpoll (AMS-57/YMS-294), a YMS-1-class minesweeper of the YMS-135 subclass built and commissioned as YMS-294 in 1943.

During the war YMS-294 served on the U.S. West Coast, Hawaiian Islands and the Marshall Islands assigned patrol and escort duty as well as mine sweeping. In December 1945 the vessel returned to Hawaii and in early 1946 transited to the East Coast for inactivation but was instead placed in service eventually in Naval Reserve training duties. In 1952 Redpoll was assigned to Norfolk, Virginia. The ship served in training duties in both a commissioned and "in service" (non-commissioned) status at Yorktown, Virginia and Chattanooga, Tennessee before being stricken from the Navy list and converted to research duties.

After conversion Sir Horace Lamb operated from 1959 to 1976 out of the Geophysical Field Station research facility in Bermuda, also known as the Bermuda SOFAR station, engaged in Navy sponsored acoustic research related to SOFAR. The vessel operated in the North Atlantic and Caribbean supporting geophysical and acoustic research programs. Though primarily engaged in acoustic and geophysical work the ship accommodated scientists working on other subjects during those normal operations and was available for charter when not scheduled for the primary mission. The ship was also used in the Bermuda area supporting other Navy and military projects, including early work in establishing means of detecting underground nuclear testing. Sir Horace Lamb was largely crewed by Bermudians and was retired in 1976 when a last voyage was made to the United States for disposal by Navy sale 1 December 1976.

== YMS-294/Redpoll ==
The ship was laid down as YMS-294 on 10 June 1943 by Associated Shipbuilders, Lake Union, Seattle, Washington and launched 11 August 1943 sponsored by Miss Joanne Swanson. The ship was commissioned YMS-294 on 11 September 1943.

YMS-294 remained in the Puget Sound area through the fall of 1943 then, in January 1944, moved south to San Pedro, California operating out of that port until April. On the 21st, the motor minesweeper departed for Pearl Harbor arriving on 1 May. She completed a round trip run to Midway Island before continuing in June to the Marshall Islands. There, principally out of Kwajalein and Eniwetok, the vessel engaged in patrol operations, convoy escort duty and minesweeping.

In December 1945 YMS-294 returned to Hawaii remaining there until February until ordered inactivated. The vessel got underway for the U.S. East Coast arriving at Charleston, South Carolina in late June. There the ship received new orders and in September moved to the Gulf of Mexico for duty in the 8th Naval District. On 12 November she was decommissioned and placed in service at New Orleans, Louisiana. The following month she assumed U.S. Naval Reserve training duties at Houston, Texas.

On 1 September 1947 YMS-294 was named Redpoll and redesignated AMS-57. Redpoll was recommissioned effective 20 November 1950, but until 1952 remained in the 8th Naval District as a reserve training ship. In May 1952, she departed Lake Charles, Louisiana, and steamed back to the Atlantic coast. Assigned to the 5th Naval District for the next 5 years she operated out of Norfolk, Virginia for 2 years. In June 1954 the ship shifted to Yorktown, Virginia for duty with the Mine Warfare School.

On 7 February 1955 Redpoll was redesignated MSCO-57. In October 1957 she was ordered to Chattanooga, Tennessee for reserve training duty. She arrived at her new homeport 2 November and 6 days later, 8 November, was again decommissioned and placed in service. (Note: The term "in service" with regard to U.S. Naval vessels is applied to periods of non-commissioned status. The ship is not U.S.S. during those periods as that only applies for commissioned ships.) A little over 1 1/2 years later she completed her last tour. She was placed out of service and struck from the Navy list 1 July 1959.

== RV Sir Horace Lamb ==
The ship was converted and renamed Sir Horace Lamb to support acoustic research, specifically SOFAR research, and assigned to the Geophysical Field Station, also known as the Bermuda SOFAR station, operated by Columbia University and associated with its Lamont Observatory. The vessel was named for the eminent British physicist and writer on hydrodynamics, Horace Lamb. The name was chosen by Gordon Hamilton, who was in charge of the Bermuda station, knowing that giving it the name of an Englishman would please locals.

The primary mission of the station and vessel was data collection on the characteristics of the SOFAR, or deep sound, channel and its variations by geographical location and season. An example of the ship's operations were observations in an area bounded by Bermuda, 15° North 55° West, Barbados and Puerto Rico during which sound velocity measurements were made. The observations were to determine short term variation at the site, long term variations by revisiting the same sites and variance by geographical location by measuring velocities at several sites within a short time period.

In addition to routine cruises supporting acoustic research the ship was engaged in larger experiments in the Bermuda area. As an example, in 1963 Sir Horace Lamb served as the source ship for an experiment studying the attenuation of low frequency sound waves at bottom mounted hydrophones in the deep sound channel, another name for the SOFAR channel, where the receiving hydrophone lies on or near a steep slope. Two receiving hydrophones were used, one being an existing Artemis vertical string hydrophone the other suspended from the Naval Underwater Sound Laboratory experimental support ship USS Brattleboro (EPCER-852). The Artemis hydrophone was amplified by equipment on Argus Island and recorded at the Tudor Hill Laboratory.

Another example of work not directly connected with routine acoustic research was the ship's use in supporting some of the work Columbia's Lamont Geological Observatory performed for the U.S. Air Force in connection with Project Vela Uniform. That work, developing a monitoring system for detection of underground nuclear testing, involved applying methods to distinguish a nuclear test from an earthquake. Research required planting of bottom seismographs for tests with Sir Horace Lamb planting the Telemetering Bottom Seismograph, MK-2, 150 miles southwest of Bermuda in September 1960.

Incidental to the primary missions other scientists made observations from the vessel. An example is the work of two scientists, A. G Taruski and H. E. Winn, from 1969 to 1973 aboard Sir Horace Lamb and R/V Trident (Note: Vessel not further identified but from time frame likely the University of Rhode Island's first R/V Trident which operated 1962 to 1976.) surveying spotted dolphins. The vessel was available for charter by scientific groups.

Seismic profiling of the sea floor was a major tool in understanding the geology of the ocean bottom. Lamont Geological Observatory made profiling a routine matter on its ships beginning in 1961. The laboratory's ships Vema, Robert D. Conrad and Eltanin were major seismic profile collectors with Sir Horace Lamb being one of the ships making substantial contributions to the collection.

The ship, crewed by Bermudians, operated out of St. George's Harbour, St. George's Island, Bermuda into 1976 ranging from Newfoundland to Puerto Rico. Sir Horace Lamb, after work in Eleuthera, Bahamas, was returned to the United States for scrapping, leaving the station only with the smaller vessel Erline for research operations. (Note: Erline was the former MV Orrin, a 100 ft (30.5 m), 120 ton displacement offshore supply and personnel boat, acquired by the Navy and assigned to Columbia for Argus Island support.) The ship was disposed of by Navy sale on 1 December 1976 for scrapping.

== See also ==
- Horace Lamb
- SOSUS
