= Massa (surname) =

Massa is a surname of Italian origin. Notable people with the surname include:

- Baebius Massa (c. 40-45 – after 93 AD), Roman governor
- Chancel Massa (born 1985), Congolese footballer
- Davide Massa (born 1981), Italian football referee
- Edgardo Massa (born 1981), former Argentine tennis player
- Elsa Massa (1923–2018), Argentine human rights activist
- Eric Massa (born 1959), former U.S. Congressman
- Felipe Massa (born 1981), Brazilian Formula One driver
- Frank Massa (1906–1990), American engineer
- Geofrey Massa (born 1986), Ugandan footballer
- Giuseppe Massa (1948–2017), Italian footballer
- Gordon Massa (1935–2016), American baseball player
- Isaac Massa (1586–1643), Dutch merchant, traveler and diplomat
- Ivan Massa (born 1990), Ugandan airline pilot
- James Massa (born 1960), U.S. bishop
- Leo Massa (1929–2009), American cross-country skier
- Leonardo Massa (born 1967), Italian rower
- Lorenzo Massa (1882–1949), Argentine Catholic priest
- Mario Massa (1892–1956), Italian freestyle swimmer who
- Mark Massa (born 1961), a Justice of the Indiana Supreme Court
- Mark S. Massa, professor of theology at Fordham University in New York
- Marlinde Massa (1944–2014), German field hockey player
- Martí Vergés Massa (1934–2021), Spanish footballer
- Michelangelo Pisani di Massa e di Mormile (born 1933), Italian diplomat
- Mirta Massa (born 1945), Argentine beauty pageant winner
- Niccolò Massa (1485–1569), early Italian anatomist
- Sebastián Massa (born 1975), Argentine former rower
- Sergio Massa (born 1972), Argentine Justicialist Party politician
