= USNS Hayes =

US Navy research ship

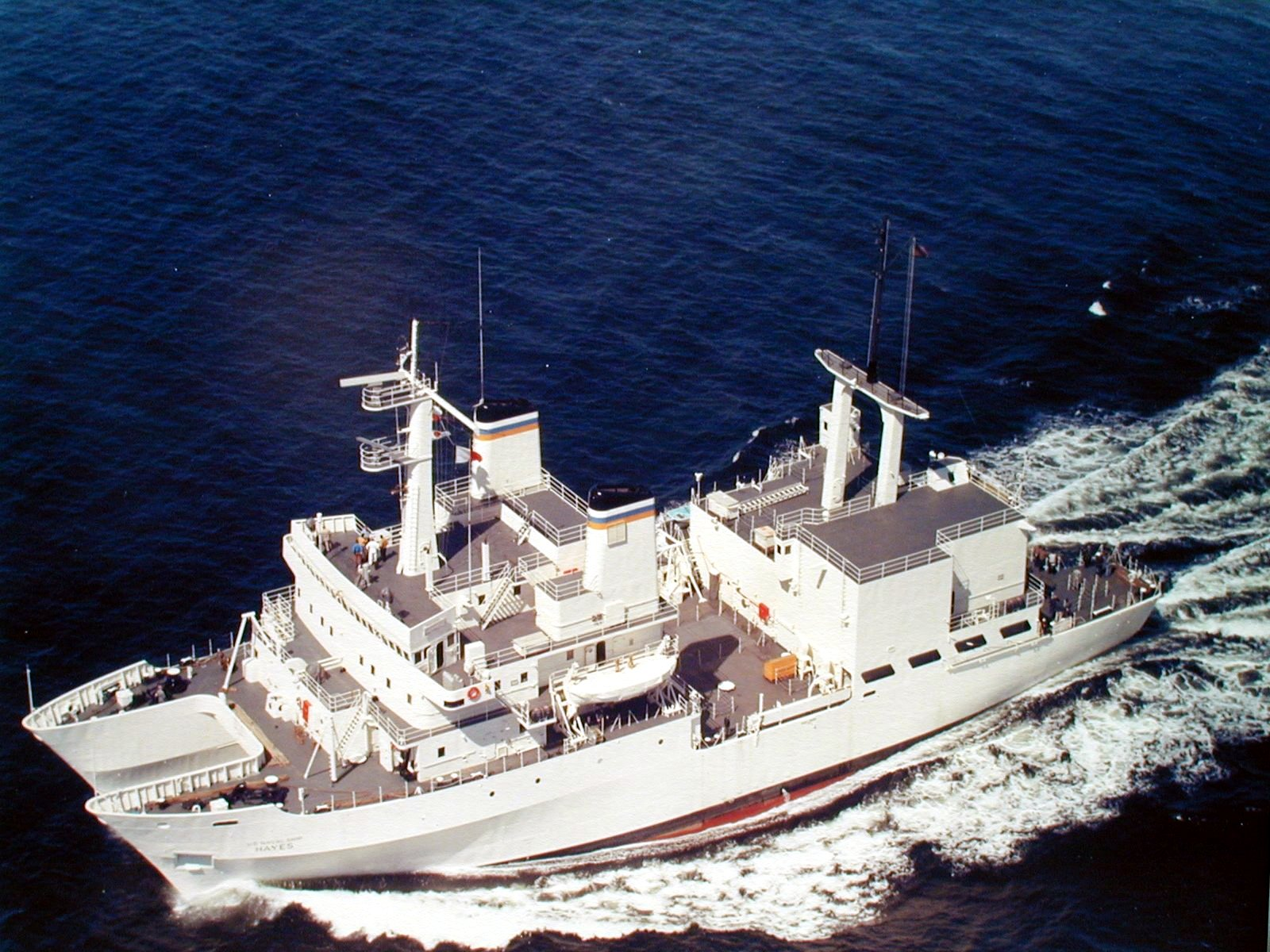

History

United States
- Name: Hayes
- Namesake: Harvey Cornelius Hayes
- Owner: U.S. Navy
- Operator: Military Sealift Command (MSC)
- Awarded: 10 December 1968
- Builder: Todd Shipyards Corp., Seattle Division, Seattle, Washington
- Cost: $13,950,000
- Yard number: 47
- Laid down: 12 November 1969
- Launched: 2 July 1970
- Acquired: 21 July 1971 placed in service as T-AGOR-16 same date (Note: MSC vessels are "in service" never commissioned.); Out of service, Ready Reserve, 10 June 1983
- In service: 1992
- Reclassified: (T-AG-195) an Acoustic Research Ship
- Fate: scrapped in 2022

General characteristics T-AGOR-16
- Type: Hayes-class oceanographic research ship, twin hull
- Displacement: 3180 full load
- Length: 246 ft 5 in (75.1 m) overall; 220 ft 0 in (67.1 m) waterline; 220 ft 0 in (67.1 m) between perpendiculars
- Beam: 75 ft 0 in (22.9 m) maximum (ship); 24 ft 0 in (7.3 m) each hull; 27 ft 0 in (8.2 m) distance between hulls
- Height: 104 ft 0 in (31.7 m)
- Draft: 21 ft 8.5 in (6.6 m)
- Installed power: 3 450 V, 3 phase, 60 Hz, 350 kW ship's service diesel generators; 2 450 V, 3 phase, 60 Hz, 75 kW scientific diesel generators; 1 450 V, 3 phase, 60 Hz, 75 kW emergency diesel
- Propulsion: 2 (1 each hull) EMD-20-645E5, 2700-BHP (total 5400 BHP) main propulsion diesel, 2 LIPS reversible pitch propeller; 2 (1 each hull) GM 67-1, 165-BHP auxiliary propulsion diesel providing "creep" speed of <4 kn (4.6 mph; 7.4 km/h)
- Speed: 15 kn (17 mph; 28 km/h) sustained at 80% power and 100% torque
- Range: 6,000 nmi (6,900 mi; 11,000 km) at 13.5 knots
- Complement: 45 civilian mariners, 25 scientific party, 5 emergency berths
- Armament: none
- Notes: Callsign: NRLW

General characteristics (T-AG-195)
- Type: acoustic research vessel
- Displacement: 4037 full load
- Length: no change
- Beam: no change
- Height: no change
- Draft: 22 ft 3.4 in (6.8 m)
- Installed power: 5 generator sets located in two isolated boxes resting on many sets of inflatable rubber mounts (acoustical quieting); 3 Caterpillar 3516 DITA Diesel Engine generator sets directly coupled to an 1150 kW (1540 shp) Kato Generator for propulsion & ship's service; 2 Caterpillar 3412 DIT generator sets rated at 320 kW (430 shp) for ship's laboratory electronics
- Propulsion: 2 Westinghouse 1200 shp dc electric motors, 2 fixed pitch propellers.
- Speed: 12.36 kn (14.22 mph; 22.89 km/h) maximum, trials
- Complement: 74 (total)
- Armament: none
- Notes: Callsign: NHAY

USNS Hayes (T-AGOR-16/T-AG-195) was a Hayes-class oceanographic research ship acquired by the United States Navy in 1971. As an AGOR the ship was sponsored by the Oceanographer of the Navy to be operated by the Military Sealift Command (MSC) under technical direction of the Naval Research Laboratory (NRL). Hayes supported a variety of oceanographic, atmospheric and bottom survey projects for NRL and assicated agencies.

The ship was named after Dr. Harvey C. Hayes, a pioneer in underwater acoustics and the former head of Naval Research Laboratory's Sound Division.

In 1992 the ship was reconfigured as an acoustics measurement ship redesignated T-AG-195 and assigned to the Naval Surface Warfare Center, Carderock Division in the Navy's program of acoustic noise reduction for submarines. The ship was based in Florida and operated at the division's South TOTO Acoustic Facility (STAFAC), located in Tongue of the Ocean. Ship measurements were replaced by a bottom moored fixed system becoming operational in 2008 with Hayes being retired.

== Design and construction ==
Hayes was sponsored by the Oceanographer of the Navy to be operated by the Military Sealift Command under the technical direction of the Naval Research Laboratory. The ship was designed under the direction of the Naval Ship Engineering Center with a preliminary design completed on March 22, 1968 by M. Rosenblatt & Son, Inc. with the contract for construction awarded for $13,950,000 December 10, 1968 .

Based on NRL's experience with the advantages of through the hull wells near the ship's centerline of USS Hunting, USNS Mission Capistrano and USNS Mizar the design for Hayes had a large, open, 85 ft 1.375 in (25.9 m) long by 39 ft 0.125 in (11.9 m) wide well through the platform. In addition there were three 30 in (76.2 cm) diameter instrument wells. Two of the small wells were located near the middle of each hull with the port hull having one forward of the ship's centerbody.

The design with the twin hull configuration giving the ship a large scientific to overall ship space ration and a large center well was also unique for the degree of ship operating automation and centralized control. Control of the ship's operation was possible from four locations. The Engineering Operating Station (EOS) allowed machinery to be unmanned and controlled by one licensed watch stander. Each hull contained one EMD-20-645E5, 2700-BHP main propulsion diesel and a GM 67-1, 165-BHP auxiliary propulsion diesel driving a reversible pitch propeller. Design sustained speed was 15 kn (17 mph; 28 km/h) with a range of 6,000 nmi (6,900 mi; 11,000 km) at 13.5 kn (15.5 mph; 25.0 km/h). The auxiliary propulsion was designed for low speed operation at under 4 kn (4.6 mph; 7.4 km/h). Ship's electrical power was by means of three 350kw generators, two 75kw generators for scientific spaces and one 75kw emergency generator.

The ship was built in Seattle, Washington, yard hull number 47 by Todd Shipyards Corp., Seattle Division, laid down on 12 November 1969 and launched on 2 July 1970. She was delivered to the Navy 21 July 1971 and placed in service by the Military Sealift Command (MSC) as USNS Hayes (T-AGOR-16).

Hayes was the first large, ocean going catamaran built in the western hemisphere. The design was essentially a monohull split into halves with a bridging cross structure. Trials and first winter operations revealed serious issues in seaworthiness with severe wave impacts causing deformation and damage to the cross structure. Two later catamaran ships, Pigeon (ASR-21) and Ortolan (ASR-22), also demonstrated this problem though less severely than the as built Hayes. The solution to the severe problem of Hayes was a foil, forward, between the keels of the two hulls with a similar solution applied to the two other catamaran hulls. (Note: Gore in "SWATH Ships" notes of the three catamarans "These ships have had controversial histories and, in the aggregate, they have left a bad taste in the Navy’s mouth." and that they were "extensively modified" to prevent the resultant shell plating damage due to excessive slamming." A flag officer is quoted as saying "We can send lone ship to Tahiti (calmer seas there), but we can’t send a whole class.” The catamaran experience lead to the SWATH ships.) Before modification with the foil up to 50% loss in operating time was reported in moderate to heavy seas while no such loss of operating time or capability was reported during the seven months after modification with the ship being described as having better performance characteristics than any other U.S. oceanographic vessel.

== Naval Research Laboratory (NRL) operations ==
In 1973 the ship became operational for NRL with its first to a North Atlantic Ocean area known for regular Soviet submarine patrols. During this voyage the Hayes Fracture Zone was discovered. That discovery with investigation of previously known fracture zones and additional data led to reevaluation of the spatial distribution of North Atlantic fracture zones that are now known to be spaced at about 35 nmi (40 mi; 65 km) intervals leading to new insight into seafloor spreading. In another 1973 survey the deepest ocean depth north of 65°N latitude, the Molloy Deep, was mapped. On later voyages Hayes conducted the first large scale survey in the Norwegian Sea using a 12 kHz narrowbeam echo sounder and Transit Satellite for navigation that were then state-of-the-art. During a 1979-1989 multiship effort in a bilateral agreement with Brazil Hayes, Robert D. Conrad and Brazil's Almirante Camara investigated the southern Mid-Atlantic Ridge.

In an example of multidisciplinary use of the ship beyond conventional oceanographic and survey the ship was engaged in measuring the electo-optical and meteorological of the atmosphere off the U.S. east coast for NRL's Atmospheric Physics Branch. Measurements would monitor aerosols and their evolution as air masses moved from continental to oceanic. The purpose was to examine relationships thought to exist between electro-optical phenomenon and marine meteorology. A similar task, partially supported by the Naval Electronic Systems Command (NAVELEX), from 1 January to 15 April 1981 was a comprehensive radiowave propagation study of received UHF and L-band from the Atlantic Fleet Satellite Communications System (FLTSATCOM) and from the existing complement of NAVSTAR/GPS with the cruise covering 35°N to 50ºS concentrating in the Southern hemisphere.

In late October 1973 Hayes rescued thirty-six crewmen in lifeboats from the burning Greek freighter Erygenes which caught fire about 700 miles (Note: Not stated as nautical or statute miles, likely statute as in New York Times which reports Coast Guard position as 41 degrees, 20 minutes N., Long. 57 degrees, 40 minutes W.) east of New York.

== Inactivation and evaluation for other use ==
The MSC daily operating cost for Hayes were estimated to exceed $20,000. Finding sponsors able to cover the cost was becoming difficult and funds for government Fiscal Year 1983 were uncertain for ship operation. Hayes was placed into Ready Reserve 10 June 1983.

In late summer and fall of 1983 Hayes, which had been for the past year pierside at the MSC, Marine Ocean Terminal, Bayonne, New Jersey became of interest as a possible replacement for the Mobile Noise Barge (MONOB) used in the Atlantic Undersea Test and Evaluation Center (AUTEC) by the David W. Taylor Naval Ship R&D Center (DTNSRDC) of the Naval Sea Systems Command. (Note: Monob One (YAG-61), ex IX-309, YW-87, sometimes erroneously called USS Monob One, was originally a WW II Water Barge, self-propelled YW-87. See MONOB I (YAG 61) at ShipScribe.) The catamaran configuration with open well was considered an advantage for acoustical operations. On 12 September 1983 funding was available for performance and maneuvering trials of Hayes while towing a long array. The ship underwent maintenance and preparation for trials, including hull cleaning, first in August then successfully in September in Bayonne. Critical characteristics, particularly regarding controllable pitch propellers, were evaluated. Trials were first done to establish baseline ship performance in transit at the Hatteras East Coast Tracking Offshore Range (HECTOR) 5-7 October 1983 and then with the towed array at AUTEC 29-30 October 1983. The towed array was composed of 4,000 ft (1,219.2 m) of cable, 1,968 ft (599.8 m) of neutrally buoyant cable and 984 ft (299.9 m) of array.

In 1984 the ship was laid up in the National Defense Reserve Fleet, James River, Fort Eustis, Virginia.

== Acoustics measurements ship, Naval Surface Warfare Center ==
Hayes was reacquired by the Navy during fiscal year 1986 and was converted into an Acoustic Research Ship at Tacoma Boatbuilding Company, Tacoma, Washington. Conversion was 95% complete in December 1990, when the vessel was removed from Tacoma Boatbuilding and completed at Naval Shipyard Bremerton, Washington. Conversion was completed with Hayes delivered to the U.S. Navy in June 1992. MSC placed the ship back into service in 1992 designated as T-AG-195.

Hayes, managed by the Naval Surface Warfare Center, Carderock Division and based at Cape Canaveral, Florida, was assigned to support the Naval Undersea Warfare Center’s Atlantic Undersea Test and Evaluation Center (AUTEC) for measuring submarine acoustic signatures. The main operating location for the ship was at the division's South TOTO Acoustic Facility (STAFAC), located in Tongue of the Ocean.

Hayes was equipped in 1994 with one-of-a-kind sensor arrays, including three acoustic deploy-able buoys from each of which were suspended a custom designed seven hundred channel High Frequency Baffled Cylindrical Array designed and built by the Westinghouse Oceanic Division of Annapolis, MD; and a Low Frequency Array of vertical line arrays designed and constructed by SAIC of McLean, Virginia. Each buoy provided over 1500 acoustic channels of information that required extensive processing by two Cray IV computers also custom designed for the application. The arrays and computer created a fully steerable sensor suit that could isolate noise sources in the submarines and assist in determining the source of excessive noise emitted by the submarine.

Submarines to be used for test and development, and to be quietened by engineers using the data from the Hayes, would pass submerged through the three buoy arrays in the deep waters off Andros Island, Bahamas.

The measurement capability at STAFAC was transitioned from Hayes to a fixed, bottom moored three-dimensional tracking, performance measurement, and data collection system of bottom and water column sensors estimated to save $4 million per year installed April – August 2008 with initial operating capability in October.

Hayes was struck from the Naval Register in 2008 and laid up at the Philadelphia Naval Shipyard. (Note: There is no history of Hayes' operations in DANFS.)

== Fate ==
On December 16, 2021, ex-USNS Hayes was towed to Brownsville, TX, where she was scrapped the following year.

== See also ==
- Atlantic Undersea Test and Evaluation Center
- Sonar
- United States Navy
