= Project Magnet =

Project Magnet may refer to:

- Project Magnet (Canada), a Canadian unidentified flying object (UFO) study
- Project Magnet (USN), a U.S. Navy geomagnetic survey project using aircraft and ships 1951–1994
