= Seascan =

Seascan or Sea Scan may refer to:

- IAI Seascan, Israeli patrol airplane based on IAI Westwind
- Outpost Seascan, an oceanographic project, see Project Magnet (USN)
- Seascan inspection ROV by Exail Technologies
- SeaScan, UAS by Insitu, on which Boeing Insitu MQ-27 ScanEagle is based
- Operation Sea Scan
