= Gray Lady Down =

1978 film by David Greene

- Theatrical release poster
- Directed by: David Greene
- Written by: Frank P. Rosenberg (adaptation); James Whittaker; Howard Sackler (screenplay)
- Based on: Event 1000; 1971 novel by David Lavallee
- Produced by: Walter Mirisch
- Starring: Charlton Heston; David Carradine; Stacy Keach; Ned Beatty; Ronny Cox; Stephen McHattie; Rosemary Forsyth
- Cinematography: Stevan Larner
- Edited by: Robert Swink
- Music by: Jerry Fielding
- Production company: The Mirisch Company
- Distributed by: Universal Pictures
- Release date: March 10, 1978
- Running time: 111 minutes
- Country: United States
- Language: English
- Box office: $5.4 million

Gray Lady Down is a 1978 American submarine disaster film directed by David Greene and starring Charlton Heston, David Carradine, Stacy Keach, Ned Beatty, Ronny Cox and Rosemary Forsyth, and includes the feature film debuts of Michael O'Keefe and Christopher Reeve (The film came out nine months before Reeve's breakthrough role as Superman, which he was already filming at the time of Gray's release). It is based on David Lavallee's 1971 novel Event 1000.

== Plot ==
Aging, respected Captain Paul Blanchard is on his final submarine tour before promotion to command of a submarine squadron (COMSUBRON). Surfaced and returning to port, the submarine, USS Neptune, is struck by a Norwegian freighter en route to New York in heavy fog. With the engine room flooded and its main propulsion disabled, the Neptune sinks to a depth of 1,450 feet (440 meters) or approx. 241.6 fathoms) on a canyon ledge above the ocean floor. A United States Navy rescue force, commanded by Captain Hal Bennett, arrives on the scene, but Neptune is subsequently rolled by a gravity slide to a greater angle that does not allow the Navy's Deep-submergence rescue vehicle (DSRV) to complete its work. As technical malfunctions increase, the submarine's sections get flooded and men die, crewmen have nervous breakdowns and tensions grow between the commanding officers.

A small experimental submersible, Snark, is brought in to assist with the rescue. Snark is very capable, but run by a U.S. Navy officer misfit, Captain Don Gates. The tiny submersible is the only hope for a rescue. Ultimately, the surviving members of the crew are rescued by the DSRV, thanks to Gates sacrificing himself by using the Snark to jam the Neptune in place as another gravity slide begins while the rescue is taking place. Moments later the gravity slide pushes the Neptune and the Snark off the ledge and into the ocean's abyss. The film ends with a somber Blanchard climbing out of the DSRV and being welcomed aboard the rescue ship USS Pigeon by Bennett and his officers.

== Cast ==
- Charlton Heston as Captain Paul Blanchard
- David Carradine as Captain Don Gates
- Stacy Keach as Captain Hal Bennett
- Ned Beatty as Mickey
- Stephen McHattie as Lieutenant Danny Murphy
- Ronny Cox as Commander David Samuelson
- Dorian Harewood as Lieutenant Fowler
- Rosemary Forsyth as Vickie Blanchard
- Hilly Hicks as HM3 Page
- Charles Cioffi as Vice Admiral Michael Barnes
- William Jordan as Waters
- Jack Rader as Chief Harkness
- Michael O'Keefe as RM2 Harris
- Charlie Robinson as McAllister
- Christopher Reeve as Lieutenant (JG) Phillips
- Melendy Britt as Liz Bennett
- Lawrason Driscoll as Lieutenant Bloom
- David Wilson as SK1 Hanson
- Robert Symonds as Secretary of Navy
- Ted Gehring as Admiral at Pentagon Meeting
- Charles Cyphers as Larson
- William Bryant as Admiral at Pentagon Meeting
- Jeffrey Druce as Neptune Executive Officer
- James Davidson as Lt. Commander at SACLANT
- David Clennon as Neptune Crewmember
- Michael Cavanaugh as P03 Peña (uncredited)
- Bob Harks as Radio Operator (uncredited)
- Robert Ito as Jim, Lieutenant at SACLANT (uncredited)
- Sandra De Bruin as Irma Barnes (uncredited)
- John Stuart West as Submariner (uncredited)

== Production ==
Even though the submarine depicted in the movie is a Skate-class submarine, in the opening credits, footage of the real-life submarine USS Trout (SS-566) was filmed specifically for Gray Lady Down, depicting the fictional USS Neptune. Gray Lady Down also re-used submarine special-effects footage and the large-scale submarine model originally used to portray the fictional submarine USS Tigerfish in the 1968 movie Ice Station Zebra to depict USS Neptune. The US Navy's USS Cayuga (LST-1186) appeared in the film as the fictional USS Nassau. The USS Pigeon (ASR-21) and her DSRV were prominently featured in the movie.

== Reception ==
Vincent Canby, reviewing for The New York Times, wrote "It's been composed with its crises so evenly spaced that you ache for a station break bracketed by commercials... The people who appear in movies like that don't act. They display various cuts of resolve and steadfastness as if they were male models."

On the review aggregator website Rotten Tomatoes, 63% of 8 critics' reviews are positive.

== See also ==
- A Fall of Moondust, 1961 science fiction novel about vehicle trapped under the lunar surface with similar plot elements.
