= USS Ortolan (ASR-22) =

1969 twin-hulled submarine rescue ship

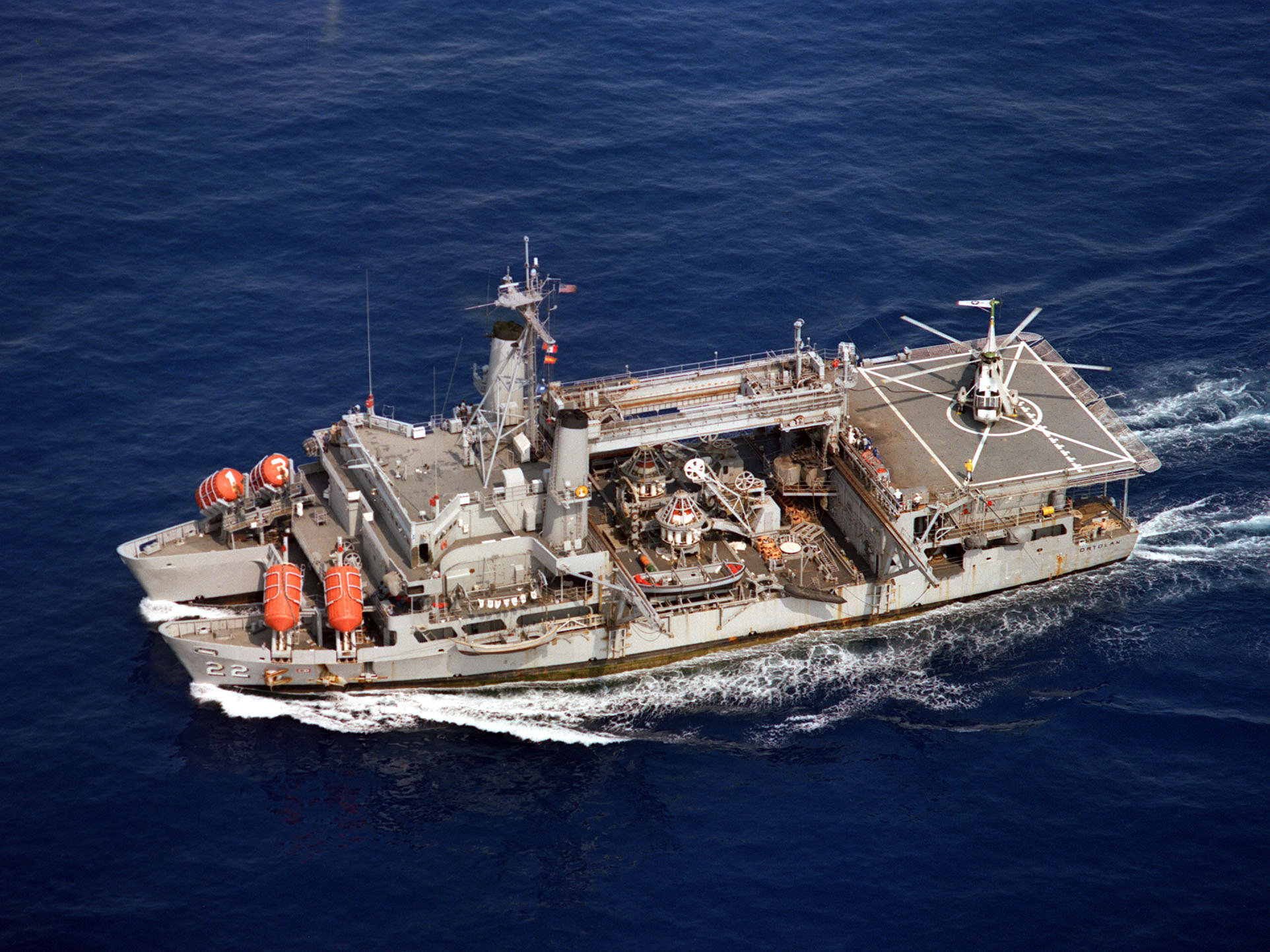

History

United States
- Name: USS Ortolan
- Ordered: 15 November 1967
- Builder: Alabama Drydock and Shipbuilding Company, Mobile, Alabama
- Laid down: 28 August 1968
- Launched: 10 September 1969
- Commissioned: 14 July 1973
- Decommissioned: 30 March 1995
- Stricken: 30 March 1995
- Fate: Awarded for scrapping, 3 July 2009

General characteristics
- Class & type: Pigeon class submarine rescue ship
- Displacement: 4,200 long tons (4,267 t)
- Length: 251 ft (77 m)
- Beam: 86 ft (26 m)
- Draft: 19 ft (5.8 m)
- Propulsion: 4 diesel engines (ALCO)
- Speed: 15 knots (28 km/h; 17 mph)
- Complement: 139 officers and enlisted
- Armament: 2 × 20 mm guns
- Aviation facilities: Helicopter platform only

USS Ortolan (ASR-22), a twin-hulled submarine rescue ship, laid down 28 August 1968 by the Alabama Drydock and Shipbuilding Company, Mobile, Alabama; launched 10 September 1969; sponsored by Mrs. Nels C. Johnson; and was commissioned 14 July 1973.

The catamaran design was essentially a monohull split into halves with a bridging cross structure. Trials and experience with USNS Hayes, the first large, ocean going catamaran built in the western hemisphere, revealed serious issues in seaworthiness with severe wave impacts causing deformation and damage to the cross structure. Pigeon (ASR-21) and Ortolan (ASR-22) exhibited a similar problem, though less severely than the Hayes before modifications were made to that ship. The solution to the severe problem of Hayes was a foil, forward, between the keels of the two hulls with a similar solution applied to the two ASR catamaran hulls. (Note: Gore in "SWATH Ships" notes of the three catamarans "These ships have had controversial histories and, in the aggregate, they have left a bad taste in the Navy’s mouth." and that they were "extensively modified" to prevent the resultant shell plating damage due to excessive slamming." A flag officer is quoted as saying "We can send lone ship to Tahiti (calmer seas there), but we can’t send a whole class.” The catamaran experience lead to the SWATH ships. See NavSource USS Ortolan (ASR-22) Hull Foil Installation at bottom of page for description of damage and photos of foil installation.)

Ortolan was designed to operate the Mystic-class deep-submergence rescue vehicles, and was the second and final vessel of the Pigeon class built by the United States Navy.

Decommissioned 30 March 1995 and berthed at the James River reserve fleet, Fort Eustis, Virginia, awaiting final determination for method of disposal.

Ortolan was awarded as part of a recycling contract to Esco Marine of Brownsville, Texas on 3 July 2009 and departed the James River Reserve Fleet on 20 July 2009 for recycling.
