= USS Pigeon (ASR-21) =

American submarine rescue ship, 1969–1992

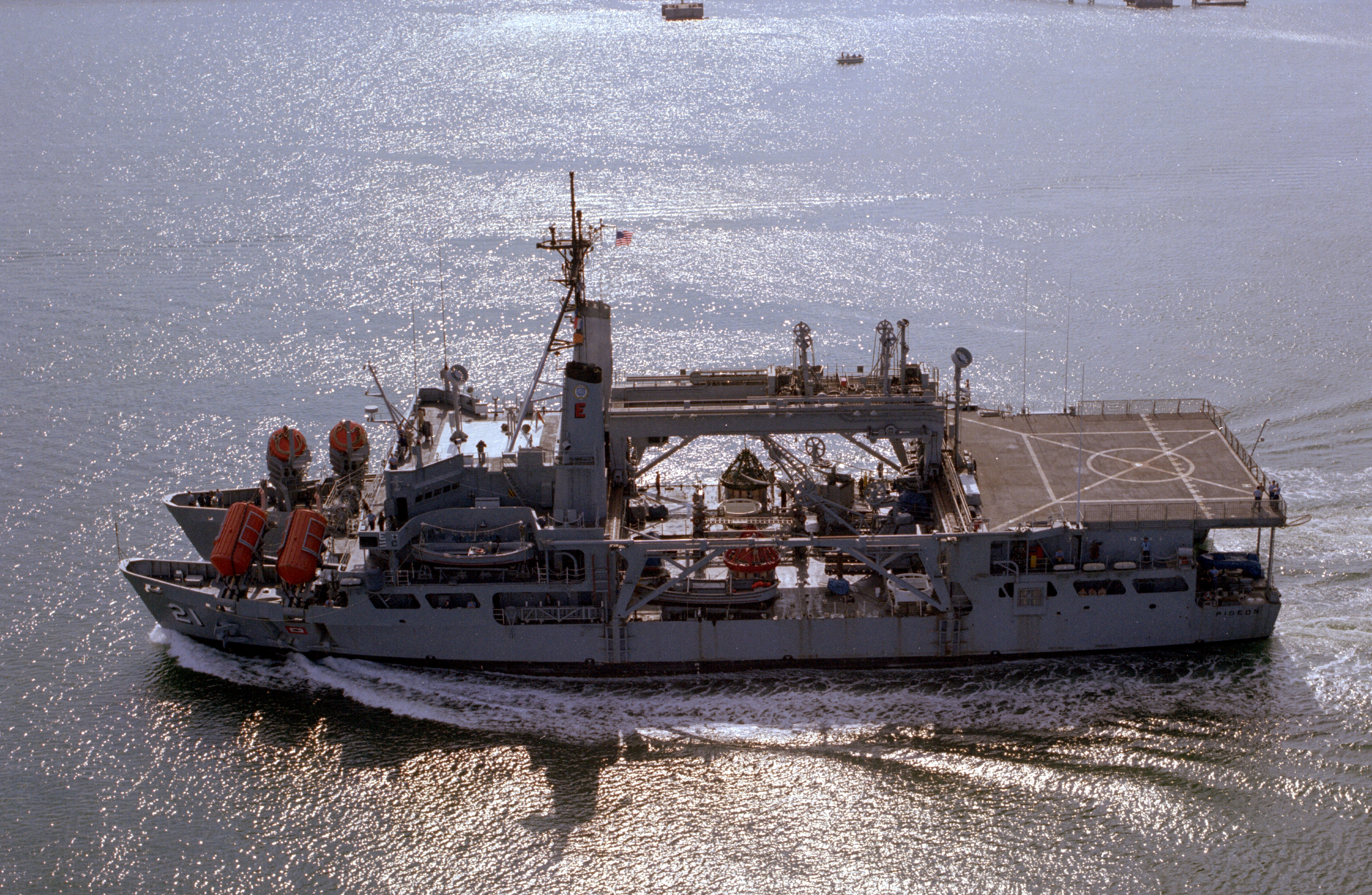
- USS Pigeon, submarine rescue ship

History

United States
- Name: USS Pigeon
- Awarded: 15 November 1967
- Builder: Alabama Drydock and Shipbuilding Company, Mobile, Alabama
- Laid down: 17 July 1968
- Launched: 13 August 1969
- Acquired: 29 January 1972
- Commissioned: 28 April 1973
- Decommissioned: 31 August 1992
- Stricken: 31 August 1992
- Fate: Sold for scrap, February 2012

General characteristics
- Class & type: Pigeon-class submarine rescue ship
- Displacement: 4,119 long tons (4,185 t) light; 4,954 long tons (5,033 t) full
- Length: 251 ft (77 m) o/a; 230 ft (70 m) w/l
- Beam: 86 ft (26 m)
- Draft: 26 ft (7.9 m)
- Propulsion: 4 diesel engines, two shafts
- Speed: 15 knots (28 km/h; 17 mph)
- Complement: 17 officers, 149 enlisted
- Armament: 2 × 20 mm guns
- Aviation facilities: Helicopter platform only

The third USS Pigeon (ASR–21) was the lead ship of her class of submarine rescue ships. Laid down on 17 July 1968 by the Alabama Dry Dock and Shipbuilding Co., Mobile, Alabama, the ship was launched on 13 August 1969, sponsored by Mrs. Allen M. Shinn, wife of Vice Admiral Shinn, Commander Naval Air Force, U.S. Pacific Fleet, and commissioned on 28 April 1973. She was a sister ship to USS Ortolan (ASR-22).

== Design ==
The leader of a new class of submarine rescue ships designed to operate with the Navy's new deep submergence rescue vehicles, Pigeon was the first seagoing catamaran warship built for the Navy since Robert Fulton's twin-hulled steam warship Fulton was built at the close of the War of 1812. Her twin hull gave great stability for deep water operations and provides ample deck working space. She was able to carry two deep submergence vehicles on her main deck. These craft were capable of docking to a disabled submarine on the sea bottom, removing survivors and transporting them to the surface. Pigeon also carried the McCann diving bell or rescue chamber of the type which was used to rescue the survivors of submarine Squalus (SS-192) in 1939. Pigeon's mooring system enabled her to maintain a precise position over a disabled submarine during rescue operations.

Pigeon's rescue control center used a three-dimensional sonar system for continuous tracking of the rescue vehicle. During rescue operations it served as a floating command post with specialized communications equipment for contacting the disabled submarine and any other craft, planes or ships working with her.

The catamaran design was essentially a monohull split into halves with a bridging cross structure. Trials and experience with USNS Hayes, the first large, ocean going catamaran built in the western hemisphere, revealed serious issues in seaworthiness with severe wave impacts causing deformation and damage to the cross structure. Pigeon (ASR-21) and Ortolan (ASR-22) exhibited a similar problem, though less severely than the Hayes before modifications were made to that ship. The solution to the severe problem of Hayes was a foil, forward, between the keels of the two hulls with a similar solution applied to the two ASR catamaran hulls. (Note: Gore in "SWATH Ships" notes of the three catamarans "These ships have had controversial histories and, in the aggregate, they have left a bad taste in the Navy’s mouth." and that they were "extensively modified" to prevent the resultant shell plating damage due to excessive slamming." A flag officer is quoted as saying "We can send lone ship to Tahiti (calmer seas there), but we can’t send a whole class.” The catamaran experience lead to the SWATH ships. See NavSource USS Ortolan (ASR-22) Hull Foil Installation at bottom of page for description of damage and photos of foil installation.)

Struck from Naval Register on 31 August 1992, Pigeon was laid up in National Defense Reserve Fleet, Suisun Bay Group. On 18 December 1998, the vessel was transferred to the Maritime Administration for disposal. However, training requirements at Fleet Training Center San Diego (FTC San Diego) identified a need for this vessel. It was reacquired by the U.S. Navy on 23 March 2002 and tied-up at Pier 11 (across from West 19th Street), Naval Base San Diego, as a non-operational training platform.

During the period of 2002 to 2005, Pigeon was used by the Naval Education and Training Command's Center for Security Forces (CENSECFOR; Master-at-arms) to conduct pier-side anti-terrorism Counter-terrorism/Security forces (AT/SF) training. CENSECFOR developed the curriculum for classroom training, and provided the on-site instructions aboard Pigeon. Curriculum and administrative support services were provided by Training Support Center San Diego (TSC San Diego; previously FTC San Diego). In October 2004, Pigeon was designated to be replaced by a new harden training structure constructed ashore (adjacent to waterfront) to continue AT/SF training. A source selection evaluation board chaired by Dr. Stephen Berrey (Director of TSC San Diego/Training Facility Department) was formed to ultimately have Pigeon transferred to the Suisun Bay Reserve Fleet (SBRF). (Note: One of three anchorages maintained by the Department of Transportation’s Maritime Administration (MARAD) for national defense and national emergency purposes.) In coordination with Fleet and Industrial Supply Center San Diego (FISCSD), Dr. Berrey arranged with the staff of Commander, Sealift Logistics Command Pacific (SEALOGPAC) to provide towing support by USNS Sioux (T-ATF-171) from Naval Base San Diego to Suisun Bay. Additionally, contractual arrangements were made with Crowley Marine Services, Inc. who provided tractor tug towing services from San Pablo Strait to the SBRF basin, Benicia, California. The Pigeon vessel was placed at Anchorage 5, in September 2005.

Pigeon was towed to Brownsville, Texas for scrapping in January 2012.

== In fiction ==
In Tom Clancy's novel The Hunt for Red October, USS Pigeon was the ship that rescued Soviet seamen from renegade ballistic missile submarine Red October after Captain Ramius fakes a shipboard emergency.

USS Pigeon and her DSRV were prominently featured in the 1978 disaster film Gray Lady Down.
