= James Percy Ault =

American surveyor and ocean explorer (1881–1929)

James Percy Ault (October 29, 1881, Olathe, Kansas – November 29, 1929, Apia, Samoa) was an American geodetic surveyor, geophysicist, geomagnetic researcher, and captain of the research vessel Carnegie. As captain of the Carnegie, he discovered submarine mountain ranges off the western coast of South America and provided empirical confirmation of the Chandler wobble.

He died with all his collaborators with the exception of a few sailors who went ashore, in circumstances that remained unexplained when the ship exploded on November 29, 1929 at the port of Apia in the Samoa Islands. A gas tank is said to have exploded. Very seriously injured, he died during transport to the hospital.

== Biography ==
Ault graduated in 1904 with an A.B. from Baker University. As an undergraduate at Baker University, he served from January 1901 to June 1904 as an observatory assistant in the United States Coast and Geodetic Survey's magnetic observatory in Baldwin, Kansas. William Charles Bauer, a physics and chemistry professor at Baker University, was impressed by Ault's abilities and gave him a recommendation to Louis Agricola Bauer, director of the Carnegie Institution's Department of Terrestrial Magnetism and William Charles Bauer's brother. Immediately after completing his undergraduate degree in June 1904, Ault joined the Carnegie Institution of Washington (CIW) as a magnetic observer in the Department of Terrestrial Magnetism. He remained a CIW employee for the rest of his life. In 1905, after preliminary training aboard the Bache on a cruise from Baltimore to Panama, he joined the crew of the research vessel Galilee to do geomagnetic research in the world's oceans. In November 1906 at the conclusion of the cruise of the Galilee, he was assigned to make magnetic observations in northern Mexico until March 1907. On March 27, 1907 in Washington, Kansas, he married Mamie A. Totten. Soon after their marriage, the Aults moved to Washington, D.C. In 1908 he made geomagnetic observations in the Canadian interior during a three-month canoe trip, covering 1,600 miles.

In 1909 he graduated with an A.M. from Columbia University. After graduation, he joined in 1909 the crew of the research vessel Carnegie, constructed of wood and non-ferrous metals to accommodate magnetic research. Aboard the Carnegie he was a magnetic observer during Cruise I from 1909 to 1910. During 1911 he did office work at CIW headquarters. In 1912 he was in charge of field parties in Bolivia, Peru, and Chile for the purpose of training magnetic observers under expeditionary field conditions. In 1912 the Aults' first daughter Evelyn was born. He was appointed in 1914 to the Carnegie's captaincy for Cruise III and in later years the captaincy for Cruises IV, VI, and VII. Carnegies Cruise IV included a circumnavigation of Antarctica in 1915–1916. The Aults' second daughter Ruth was born in 1919. In 1919 he embarked on Cruise VI. In 1920 the infant Ruth died suddenly from colitis. J. P. Ault nearly resigned to return home to be with his wife, but his colleagues persuaded him to complete Cruise VI. The Aults' third daughter Marjorie was born in 1923.

J. Harland Paul, a surgeon and observer aboard Cruise VII of the Carnegie, wrote a book about the cruise.

Ault was elected in 1923 a fellow of the American Physical Society. He was a member of the American Association for the Advancement of Science, American Geographical Society, the American Geophysical Union, Chevy Chase Citizens Association, the Cosmos Club, and the National Geographic Society. His papers stored at the Carnegie Institution include an extensive correspondence between him and his wife. He is buried in Fort Lincoln Cemetery in Brentwood, Maryland.

== Selected publications ==
=== Articles ===
- Ault, J. P.; Wallis, W. F. (1913). "Halley's observations of the magnetic declination, 1698–1700". Journal of Geophysical Research. 18 (3): 126–132a. Bibcode:1913TeMAE..18..126A. doi:10.1029/TE018i003p00126.
- —— (1916). "Cruise of the Carnegie from Lyttelton, New Zealand to South Georgia, December 6, 1915, to January 12, 1916". Journal of Geophysical Research. 21 (1): 26–27. Bibcode:1916TeMAE..21...26A. doi:10.1029/TE021i001p00026.
- —— (1917). "Sea surface-temperature and meteorological observations made on the Carnegie during her sub-Antractic cruise, December 6, 1915, to April 1, 1916". Journal of Geophysical Research. 22 (4): 183–189. Bibcode:1917TeMAE..22..183A. doi:10.1029/TE022i004p00183.
- —— (1919). "The cruise of the Carnegie for 1919–1921". Journal of Geophysical Research. 24 (3): 132. Bibcode:1919TeMAE..24..132A. doi:10.1029/TE024i003p00132.
- —— (1920). "Preliminary results of ocean magnetic observations on the Carnegie from St. Helena to Cape Town and thence to Colombo, Ceylon, April to June, 1920". Journal of Geophysical Research. 25 (3): 117–122. Bibcode:1920TeMAE..25..117A. doi:10.1029/TE025i003p00117.
- —— (1921). "Preliminary results of ocean magnetic observations on the Carnegie from Lyttelton to Tahiti, Fanning Island, San Francisco, and Honolulu, November, 1920, to April, 1921". Journal of Geophysical Research. 26: 15–24. Bibcode:1921TeMAE..26...15A. doi:10.1029/TE026i001p00015.
- ——; Fisk, H. W. (1924). "Proposed magnetic and allied observations during the total solar eclipse of January 24, 1925". Journal of Geophysical Research. 29 (4): 157–159. Bibcode:1924TeMAE..29..157A. doi:10.1029/TE029i004p00157.
- —— (July 1925). "Phases of work of the Carnegie Institution of Washington which concern the section of oceanography". Transactions, American Geophysical Union. 6 (1): 75–77. Bibcode:1925TrAGU...6...75A. doi:10.1029/TR006i001p00075.
- ——; Mauchly, S. J.; Goddard, R. H. (September 1925). "Report on magnetic and electric observations by the Carnegie Institution of Washington in connection with the total solar eclipse of January 24, 1925". Journal of Geophysical Research. 30 (3): 125–146. Bibcode:1925TeMAE..30..125A. doi:10.1029/TE030i003p00125.
- —— (1927). "Oceanogeaphic investigation's on the next cruise of the Carnegie". Transactions, American Geophysical Union. 8 (1): 198–204. Bibcode:1927TrAGU...8..198A. doi:10.1029/TR008i001p00198.
- Fleming, J. A.; —— (1928). "Program of scientific work on cruise VII of the Carnegie, 1928–1931". Journal of Geophysical Research. 33 (1): 1–10. Bibcode:1928TeMAE..33....1F. doi:10.1029/TE033i001p00001.
- —— (March 1929). "Notes on trip from Balboa, Canal Zone, to Easter Island, to Callao, Peru, October 25, 1928 to January 14, 1929". Journal of Geophysical Research. 34 (1): 26–31. Bibcode:1929TeMAE..34...26A. doi:10.1029/TE034i001p00026.
- —— (March 1929). "Preliminary values of the annual changes of the magnetic elements in the North Atlantic Ocean, as determined from the Carnegie results, 1909–1928". Journal of Geophysical Research. 34 (1): 31–34. Bibcode:1929TeMAE..34...31A. doi:10.1029/TE034i001p00031.
- Pritchett, Henry S.; Campbell, W. W.; ——; Adams, Walter S. (September 13, 1929). "The Second Celebration of the Twenty-Fifth Anniversary of Research in the Carnegie Institution of Washington". Science. 70 (1811): 243–250. Bibcode:1929Sci....70..243.. doi:10.1126/science.70.1811.243. PMID 17755120.
- ——; Físk, H. W. (December 1929). "Preliminary values of the annual changes of the magnetic elements in the Caribbean Sea and the Pacific Ocean, as determined from the Carnegie results, 1909–1929, and from the Galilee results, 1905–1908". Journal of Geophysical Research. 34 (4): 292–299. Bibcode:1929TeMAE..34..292A. doi:10.1029/TE034i004p00292.
- —— (1930). "Preliminary results of ocean magnetic observations on the Carnegie from Hawaii to Samoa, October to November, 1929". Journal of Geophysical Research. 35 (1): 17–21. Bibcode:1930TeMAE..35...17A. doi:10.1029/TE035i001p00017.

=== Books ===
- Ault, James Percy; Mauchly, S. J. (1926). Ocean Magnetic and Electric Observations 1915-1921. Researches of the Department of Terrestrial Magnetism, Volume V. Carnegie Institution of Washington.
