= Project Magnet (USN) =

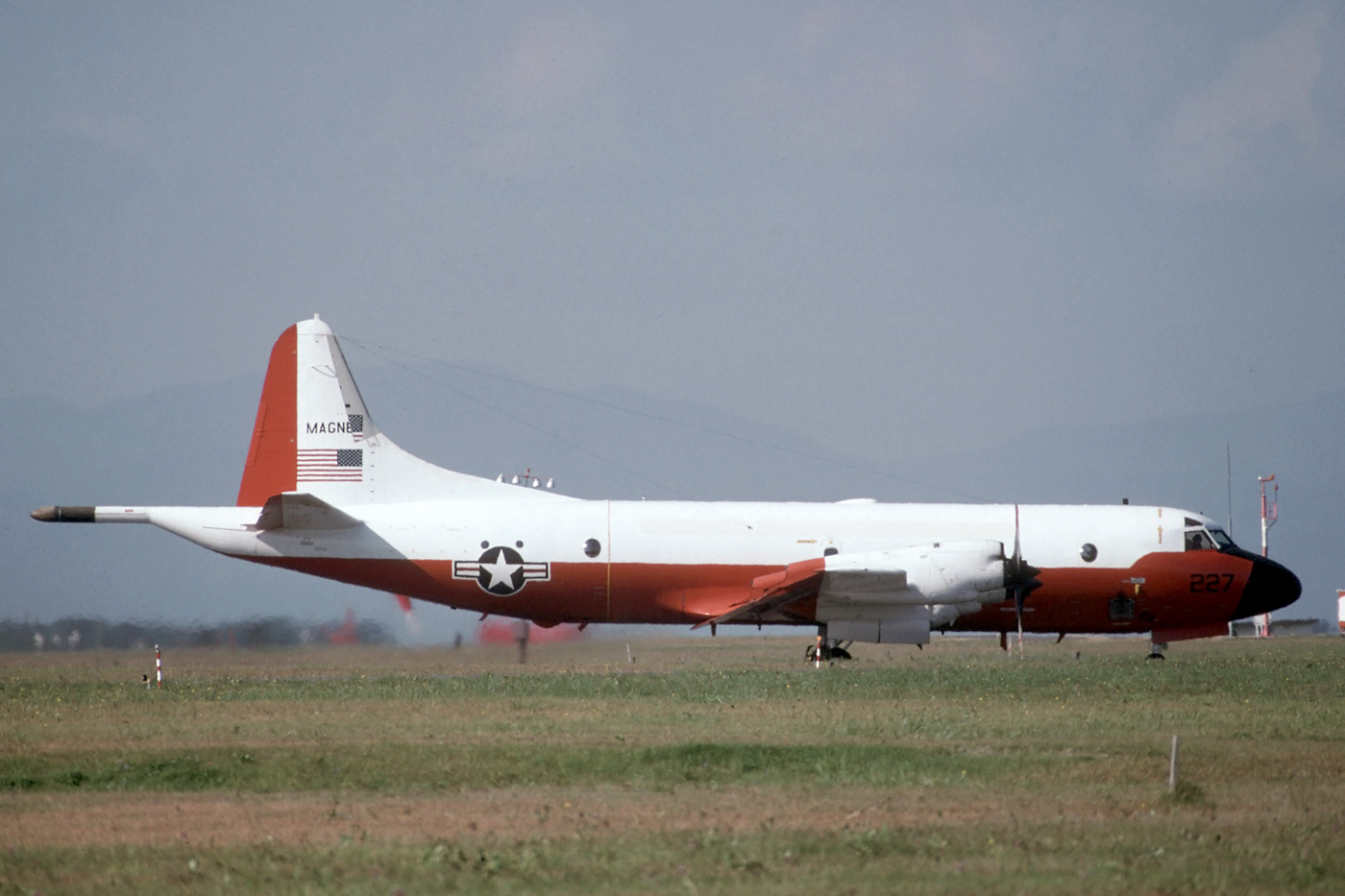
Project Magnet RP-3D at Misawa (Japan) 27 October 1994 after Project Magnet transfer to Naval Research Laboratory.

Project Magnet was a major geomagnetic survey effort from 1951 through 1994. The project originated in the U.S. Navy Hydrographic Office, renamed the U.S. Naval Oceanographic Office (NAVOCEANO), supporting world magnetic modeling and charting. The project used aircraft flying magnetic surveys worldwide. Additional magnetic data were collected with geophysical survey ships in conjunction with other projects for combination into final products. Data was used to support navigation of ships and aircraft and to meet Naval requirements as well as scientific research.

The project aircraft were operated by several special Navy flight organizations but for most of the project's span by Oceanographic Development Squadron Eight (VXN-8) based at Naval Air Station Patuxent River. Civilian scientists from the Oceanographic Office were assigned to the missions for data collection. A variety of specially modified aircraft capable of long flights were used. The aircraft were notable for the international orange and white livery and the authorized use of cartoon characters, Roadrunner being one and the last used, on their fuselages. The missions required use of civilian facilities, often in remote areas, where no military ones were available thus drawing attention in places where naval aircraft were not ordinarily seen. The missions, structured to last two months, were flown all over the world.

== History ==
Earth Magnetic Field Declination from 1590 to 1990.

The Hydrographic Office, later the Naval Oceanographic Office, was responsible for publishing charts defining components the world magnetic field. After the non-magnetic vessel Carnegie blew up in 1909 collection of oceanic magnetic field information capability was lost. By 1951 those charts were so inadequate that Project Magnet was required to collect oceanic magnetic data. (Note: The Hydrographic Office/NAVOCEANO publication of charts was transferred to the Defense Mapping Agency upon creation of that agency. Responsibility for data collection and data analysis continued in NAVOCEANO.)

Project Magnet began in 1951 with a budget addition at the Hydrographic Office for airborne geomagnetic surveys to gather data supporting charting the Earth's magnetic field using a Naval Ordnance Laboratory Type 2 Vector Airborne Magnetometer, capable of measuring intensity and direction of the field, and a P2V Neptune. The aircraft, named Pineapple Special, was assigned to the Airborne Early Warning Training Unit, predecessor of Oceanographic Development Squadron Eight (VXN-8), and underwent experimentation and modifications to eliminate local magnetic fields that would effect data collection. Those included modifying the aircraft electrical systems, replacing parts with nonmagnetic materials and adding compensators. By spring of 1953 the system was proven to be able to collect vector geomagnetic data and began operations that included intensity, dip and variation data for Project Magnet. With proven success the Hydrographic office and the United States Coast and Geodetic Survey, which also had magnetic survey responsibility over U.S. territory, arranged for the approval of the member states of the International Hydrographic Organization (IHO) of the project with provision that magnetic variation charts be published at five year intervals (Epochs) by the Hydrographic Office.

The introduction of the proton precession magnetometer enabled supplemental data collection from steel-hulled ships, making the extreme measures used for Carnegie unnecessary. The magnetic information was used for safe surface and air navigation, special Navy requirements and general scientific research. Magnetic Variation Charts were published on a five-year schedule by the Naval Oceanographic Office and later by the Defense Mapping Agency, now the National Geospatial Intelligence Agency. Data also was published in tabular form and in reports detailing specific aspects and areas. The project ended in 1994 with data now available through the National Oceanic and Atmospheric Administration, National Centers for Environmental Information (NCEI).

== Surveys ==
Project Magnet in strict terms were the airborne surveys conducted by the specially equipped aircraft. Those surveys, responding to specific magnetic data collection requirements, were supplemented by surveys conducted by ships collecting magnetic data in conjunction with other projects. Designated, detailed magnetic surveys of specific areas were conducted by both the aircraft and the ships. Coincidental with stopovers the survey party undertook land gravity observations after provision of land gravity meters for project aircraft between October 1962 and March 1963. Eighty-one stations had been added to the establishment of the First Order World Gravity Network by the end of fiscal year 1963. During the 1967 fiscal year 110 stations in sixteen countries were established. The First Order World Gravity Network was established by use of absolute gravimeters as primary reference stations. (Note: See Gravimetry for absolute vice relative gravity measurement instruments and calibration.)

For most of the project's existence aircraft were operated by VXN-8 based at Naval Air Station Patuxent River, Maryland with civilian experts from the Naval Oceanographic Office were assigned to the missions for data collection. The original aircraft, assigned in 1951, was a P2V Neptune but the aircraft's narrow cabin made work difficult so that a larger, aircraft a Douglas C-54 Skymaster, designated NC-54R, replaced it. The final aircraft was a specially built Lockheed P-3 Orion variant designated RP-3D. Three RP-3D aircraft were eventually flown by VXN-8 but each was mission specific. The other two were assigned to the oceanographic projects Project Birdseye and Outpost Seascan. (Note: Project Birdseye was a U.S. Naval Oceanographic Office and Naval Research Laboratory sea ice observation program. Birdseye data is now available from NOAA. Outpost Seascan was originally Project ASWEPS, a worldwide air observation of oceanographic conditions supporting Antisubmarine Warfare Environmental Prediction Services. (see reference Naval Aviation News, "VXN-8 World Travelers" for more).)

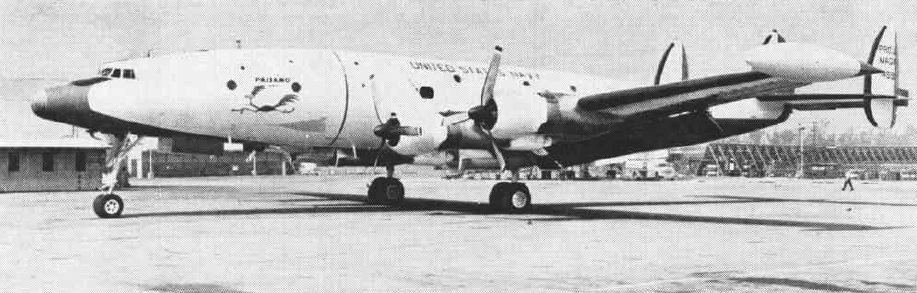
Project Magnet Lockheed NC-121K at NAS Patuxent River 1963. Note Roadrunner character on fuselage.

In 1953 operational surveys began over the North Atlantic with the P2V which was retired the next year with it being replaced by the larger NC-54R. The change in aircraft would cause loss of a year's air operations so a Lockheed Super Constellation variant designated NC121K was acquired for mapping the southern hemisphere. An indication of the globe spanning scope of flights is contained in an 11 November 1959 Department of Defense press release regarding the flight of the NC121K leaving the Naval Air Station Anacosta with a Hydrographic Office geophysical team for Mexico City, Lima, Rio de Janeiro, Luanda, Mauritius, Singapore, Guam, Midway Island and San Francisco due to return to NAS Anacosta about 11 December.

The early aeromagnetic surveys included a search for the north magnetic pole on 2 September 1960 by the project's P2V which flew triangular search patterns at 11,000 ft (3,352.8 m). On 23 October 1960 the aircraft flew the same triangular patterns at 13,000 ft (3,962.4 m) in a search for the south magnetic pole. Not all surveys were over the ocean or at such altitude. Two aircraft, the Douglas C-54 Skymaster, NC-54R (Bureau number 90396), and the NC121K (Bureau number 145925), flew five mile line spacing at 6,000 ft (1,828.8 m) in a swath across the eastern United States east of 103 degrees longitude in a crustal study between August 1962 and June 1964. The same aircraft continued the swath west into the Pacific Ocean during flights from August 1962 to February 1965. The altitude was 16,000 ft (4,876.8 m) over land but decreased to 6,000 ft (1,828.8 m) over the Coastal Range and Pacific Ocean. The NC-54R flew the United States Coastal Region Survey between 27 May 1964 and 30 October 1960 covering 450,000 sq nmi (1,543,456.8 km^{2}) between Maine and Florida at 5 nmi (5.8 mi; 9.3 km) spacing with cross tracks at altitudes of 500 ft (152.4 m) over ocean, 2,500 ft (762.0 m) over land north of the Potomac River and 1,500 ft (457.2 m) over land south of the Potomac River.

Specific, localized surveys were also conducted on occasion. In January 1961 a survey of Plantagenet Bank was flown by an NC-54R covering the feature with 0.5 nmi (0.58 mi; 0.93 km) east–west lines at 500 ft (152.4 m) altitude. The survey produced "Contour charts of total magnetic intensity, inclination, declination, anomalous X, Y, and Z components of the earth's field" over the 52 sq nmi (178.4 km^{2}) area. The bank, just off Bermuda, was of particular interest at the time to the Navy's Project Artemis in which an initial installation of a horizontal and a vertical string of hydrophones were installed during 1961. A unique opportunity came on 14 November 1963 when the volcanic island of Surtsey emerged off Iceland when a project aircraft was in the area to fly a survey of the emerging island at 2,000 ft (609.6 m) altitude. During July 1966 the dormant island was resurveyed revealing a magnetic anomaly not evident in the original survey.

By the late 1980s the RP-3D Project Magnet aircraft, specially built using nonmagnetic materials aft of the main cabin door, was named Roadrunner and had the distinctive squadron livery of international orange and white. (Note: El Coyote flew for Project Seascan and Arctic Fox flew for Project Birdseye.) For the long flights extra fuel was carried in a sixth tank in what was normally the bomb bay. Crews had been assigned for the full two month missions but eventually, for safety, were assigned for six week cycles and are relieved by a fresh crew at the end of their cycle. A crew was composed of three pilots, two flight engineers, two flight officers (an ocean project navigator and an ocean project coordinator), two enlisted utility crew, an ordinanceman, a radar operator, a radio operator and four civilian scientists. Aircraft maintenance was done by the crew as the aircraft had to operate far from VP or even military bases during the two month missions. Most missions were flown at night when the magnetic field is most stable.

On 21 September 1993 VXN-8 was disestablished with the Project Magnet and Project Birdseye aircraft being transferred to the Naval Research Laboratory (NRL) Flight Support Detachment that was also located at NAS Patuxent River. The project came to an end the next year.

== Products ==
Navigation charts published by both military and civilian agencies responsible for nautical chart publication in the United States had information on magnetic variation, the difference between true and magnetic north. A standard feature was the compass rose with true north in an outer circle and magnetic north in an inner circle with annual change noted so that navigators could make a correction until a new chart or compass rose update was made. Special world charts were published with isometric lines for magnetic variation (isogonic chart) and magnetic dip (isoclinic chart).

In addition to the published charts project data supported special Navy applications and the surveys were often covered by unclassified technical papers. An important example of scientific use is the 58,000 sq nmi (198,934.4 km^{2}) aeromagnetic survey of the Reykjanes Ridge flown at 1,500 ft (457.2 m) with 2 nmi (2.3 mi; 3.7 km) to 4 nmi (4.6 mi; 7.4 km) line spacing between October and November 1963 resulted in the 1965 Hydrographic Office Informal Report H-3-65, "An Airborne Geomagnetic Survey of the Reykjanes Ridge, 1963." That survey and report were the basis for a paper in Deep Sea Research in 1966 titled "Magnetic Anomalies Over the Reykjanes Ridge" by J. R. Heirtzler, X. Le Pichon, and J. G. Baron. That paper is cited as the basis of "an iconic color image of the classic Project Magnet aeromagnetic stripes correlated with the magnetic reversal time scale" important in defining seafloor spreading and basis for a figure used by Frederick Vine in his work.

=== Other magnetic surveys ===
Sgt. Curtis F. Shoup Southwest Pacific Survey.

Ship surveys were not specifically part of Project Magnet but magnetic data collection was routine during missions for other projects after ship magnetometers became available. Those data, also collected under the Naval Oceanographic Office's Magnetics Division, were integrated with project data. Data in transit provided profile information while survey area grids provided contour information. In an unusual example from 20 November 1961 to 13 March 1962 in the North Atlantic the three large geophysical survey ships Bowditch, Dutton and Michelson collected 17,200 nmi (19,800 mi; 31,900 km) in a simultaneous track keeping 10 nmi (12 mi; 19 km) spacing between ships by radar and using Loran-C and other precise navigational aids. A more typical, single ship operation, is seen in Southwest Pacific survey by Sgt. Curtis F. Shoup in which 78,500 nmi (90,300 mi; 145,400 km) of data was collected in an irregular pattern between 18 May 1963 and 1 November 1965.

== See also ==
Earth's magnetic field

== Bibliography ==
- Bates, Charles C. (2005). Hydro to Navoceano: 175 years of ocean survey and prediction by the U.S. Navy, 1830-2005. Rockton, Ill.: Corn Field Press. ISBN 097741440X. LCCN 2006276442.
- Brennan, James A.; Davis, Thomas M. (1969). The Influence of the Natural Environment on MAD Operations (PDF) (Report). Washington, D.C.: U.S. Naval Oceanographic Office. Archived from the original (PDF) on March 27, 2020.
- Chief of Naval Operations (1994). "VXN-8 World Travelers". Naval Aviation News. Vol. 78, no. 8 (September—October).
- Coleman, Rachel J. (June 1, 1992). Project MAGNET High-level Vector Survey Data Reduction. Types and Characteristics of Data for Geomagnetic Field Modeling (Report). Vol. 3153. Bay Saint Louis, MS: Naval Oceanographic Office. p. 215. Bibcode:1992NASCP3153..215C.
- Commander, U.S. Naval Oceanographic Office (1963). Annual Report of the Commander (Report). Washington, D.C.: U.S. Naval Oceanographic Office.
- Commander, U.S. Naval Oceanographic Office (1967). Oceanography '67 — Annual Report of the Commander (Report). Washington, D.C.: U.S. Naval Oceanographic Office.
- Evans, Julius L. (1987). "VXN-8 The World is Their Backyard". Naval Aviation News. Vol. 89, no. 5 (October).
- Hey, Richard; Martinez, Fernando; Höskuldsson, Ármann; Benediktsdóttir, Ásdís (19 March 2010). "Propagating rift model for the V-shaped ridges south of Iceland" (PDF). Geochemistry, Geophysics, Geosystems. 11 (3). AGU and the Geochemical Society: n/a. Bibcode:2010GGG....11.3011H. doi:10.1029/2009GC002865. S2CID 128451270.
- Lawyer, Lee C.; Bates, Charles C.; Rice, Robert B. (2001). Geophysics in the Affairs of Mankind: A Personalized History of Exploration. Tulsa, OK: Society of Exploration Geophysicists. ISBN 1560800879. LCCN 00027649.
- Magnetics Division (1970). U.S. Naval Oceanographic Office Geomagnetic Surveys (IR No. 70-18) (PDF) (Report). Washington, D.C.: Hydrographic Surveys Department, U.S. Naval Oceanographic Office. Archived from the original (PDF) on October 22, 2021.
- Mullarkey, William E.; Cobb, A. Donn (1 October 1966). Artemis Module Field Survey by Alvin (Report). New London, CT: U.S. Naval Underwater Sound Laboratory.
- NIMA (1995). American Practical Navigator (PDF). Bethesda, Maryland: National Imagery and Mapping Agency (NIMA). Archived from the original (PDF) on 6 March 2018.
- NOAA NCEI (2020). "Project Magnet Data". NOAA, National Centers for Environmental Information (NCEI).
- Pinon, Diego Alejandro (March 2016). Development of a Precise Gravimetric Geoid Model for Argentina (Master of Science in Geospatial Sciences). School of Mathematical and Geospatial Sciences, College of Science Engineering and Health, RMIT University. S2CID 132660699.
- Reade, David (1992). "RPD-3 Orions Gather Oceanographic and Research Information" (PDF). ASWlog — Antisubmarine Warfare Magazine.
- Schonstedt, E. O.; Irons, H. R. (1955). "NOL vector airborne magnetometer type 2A". Eos, Transactions American Geophysical Union. 36 (1): 25»41. Bibcode:1955TrAGU..36...25S. doi:10.1029/TR036i001p00025.
- Stockard, Henry P. (1969). Worldwide Surveys by Project Magnet (Presented to XI Pan American Consultation on Cartography) (Report). Washington, D.C.: Naval Oceanographic Office.
