= Carnegie (yacht) =

American research vessel (1909–1929)

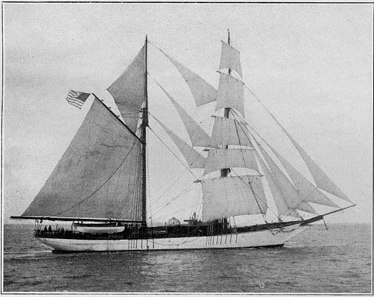
- yacht Carnegie (1909-1929) sailing for the Carnegie Institution for Science of Washington, D.C., on her first scientific / research magnetic surveying cruise

History
- Name: Carnegie
- Owner: Carnegie Institution for Science (Washington, D.C.)
- Builder: Tebo Yacht Yard, (Brooklyn, New York)
- Cost: US$115,000
- Launched: June 12, 1909
- Fate: Destroyed by fire November 29, 1929
- Notes: Designed by Henry J. Gielow

General characteristics
- Tonnage: 323 tons
- Displacement: 568 tons
- Length: 155 ft 6 in (47.40 m)
- Beam: 33 ft (10 m)
- Draft: 12 ft 7 in (3.84 m)
- Installed power: 150 horsepower
- Propulsion: Producer gas engine
- Sail plan: Brigantine

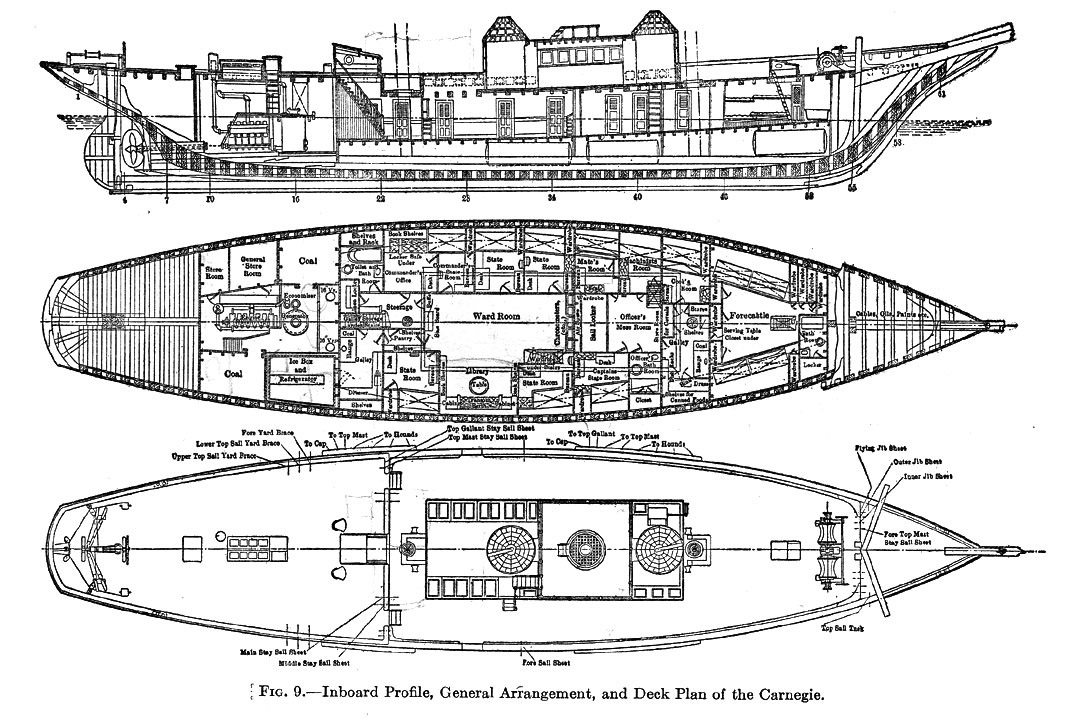
Inboard profile, general arrangement and deck plan of the Carnegie

Carnegie was a brigantine-rigged sailing yacht, equipped as a scientific research vessel, constructed almost entirely from wood and other non-magnetic materials to allow sensitive magnetic measurements to be taken for the Carnegie Institution for Science's Department of Terrestrial Magnetism at their headquarters in Washington, D.C. She carried out a series of cruises from her launch in 1909 to her unfortunate destruction by an onboard explosion and fire while in port in 1929. She covered almost 300,000 miles (500,000 km) in her twenty years at sea in the cause of scientific knowledge.

The Carnegie Rupes on the planet Mercury are named after this research vessel.

== Construction ==
Louis Agricola Bauer, the first director of the Department of Terrestrial Magnetism at the Carnegie Institution, wanted to focus on acquiring oceanic magnetic data to improve the understanding of the Earth's magnetic field. After an experiment in which the brigantine Galilee was adapted by removing as much magnetic material as possible, it became clear that a new entirely non-magnetic ship was needed. After convincing the institution's board, Bauer set about getting such a vessel built. Carnegie was designed by naval architect Henry J. Gielow and built at the Tebo Yacht Basin Company yard in Brooklyn, New York. Gielow's design minimised the amount of magnetic materials used in its construction and fittings. Locust trunnels were used to hold together the timbers with the help of some bronze or copper bolts. Carnegie was primarily a sailing vessel, but its unique, non-ferrous, auxiliary engine was capable of propelling the vessel in calm weather at a speed of 6 knots. The construction used white oak, yellow pine, and Oregon pine with copper or bronze-composition metal for all the fastenings in the hull or rigging. The anchors were made of bronze and were attached to 11 inches (28 cm) hemp cables. A reserve engine was required to increase manoeuvrability and allow passage through the doldrums, so Carnegie was fitted with a producer gas engine, made mainly of copper and bronze, using coal as a fuel. She cost $115,000 (about 10 million dollars today) to build.

Carnegie was 155.5 feet (47.4 m) long with a beam of 33 feet (10 m). She was rigged as a brigantine, with square sails on the foremast, giving a total sail area of 12,900 square feet (1,200 m^{2}). The most distinctive feature was the observation deck, with its two observing domes made of glass in bronze frames. This allowed observations to be made under all weather conditions.

== Cruises ==
Between 1909 and 1921 Carnegie carried out 6 cruises, including one where she managed the fastest circumnavigation of the south polar continent of Antarctica by a sailing vessel, in 118 days, a testing voyage where thirty icebergs were sighted on a single day. William John Peters captained cruises I and II, James P. Ault captained cruises III, IV, and VI, and Harry Marcus Weston Edmonds captained cruise V. During the 6 cruises the Carnegie sailed more than 250,000 nautical miles and traversed all oceans between latitudes 80º North and 60º South. From 1921 to 1927 Carnegie was laid up for an extensive refit / refurbishment, including new deck timbers and a thicker copper hull. The old producer gas engine was replaced with a gasoline fuelled one. In 1928, under Captain James P. Ault, Carnegie set off on her seventh cruise, which was intended to take three years. Soundings taken during this voyage discovered and named the Carnegie Ridge off-shore of Ecuador and the West Coast / Pacific Ocean of South America.

== Destruction ==
After completing 43,000 miles (69,000 km) of the planned voyage, Carnegie put into the port of Apia, Samoa for supplies on 28 November 1929. While refuelling with gasoline there was an explosion, which mortally wounded Captain Ault and killed the cabin boy. Carnegie burnt to the waterline within a few hours.

== Scientific legacy ==
Carnegie carried a wide range of oceanographic, atmospheric and geomagnetic instrumentation and many scientists were associated with its findings and analysis, notably Harald Sverdrup, Roger Revelle and Scott Forbush (who escaped the fire that destroyed the sailing ship) when docked in Samoa in the South Pacific Ocean in November 1929).

=== Geomagnetism ===
By 1930 the Department of Terrestrial Magnetism had enough data to be able to produce a much better view of Earth's magnetic field than had previously been available. The loss of the sailing brigantine schooner / yacht Carnegie in 1929 after 20 years of work, left a void in the capability to collect oceanic magnetic data. By 1951 world magnetic charts were badly flawed. As a result the United States Navy Oceanographic / Hydrographic Office initiated the Navy's Project Magnet, an airborne program to collect additional magnetic data world wide. The introduction of the proton precession magnetometer enabled magnetic data collection from steel-hulled ships routine by 1957 making the extreme measures used for Carnegie unnecessary.

=== Atmospheric electricity ===
The atmospheric electrical measurements carried out aboard Carnegie are of enduring and fundamental importance in understanding the balance of electric current flow in the atmosphere, the system known as the global atmospheric electric circuit. Most significantly, the results showed that the atmospheric electric field—a quantity always present away from thunderstorms—shows a characteristic daily variation which was independent of the position of the ship. This is known as the Carnegie curve.

== See also ==
- Zarya (non-magnetic ship)
- Project Magnet
