= Argus Island =

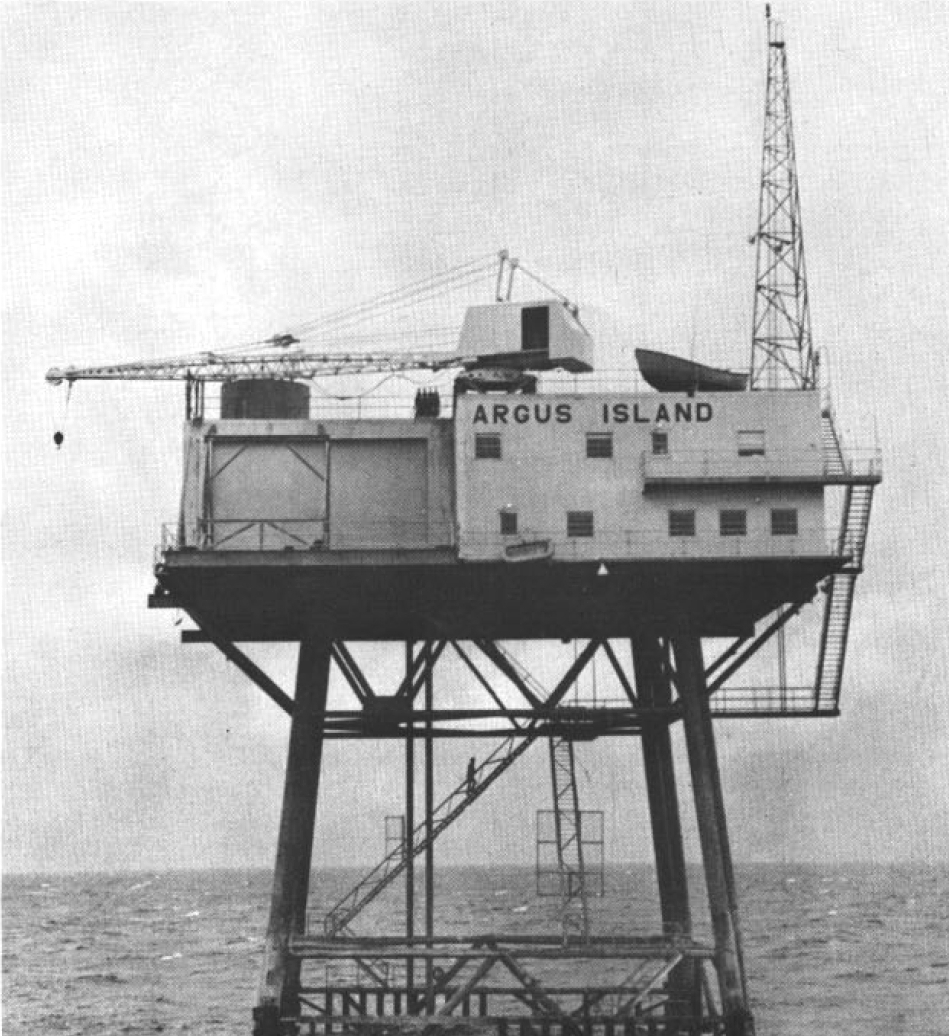
Argus Island Tower

Argus Island was an acoustic research tower and platform located on Plantagenet Bank, a guyot about 30 miles southwest of the island of Bermuda. The tower was originally part of the facilities supporting Project Artemis and Project Trident under auspices of the Tudor Hill Laboratory, a facility of the US Navy's Underwater Sound Laboratory. (Note: The Tudor Hill Laboratory and Argus Island were acoustic research and development facilities not a part of the Sound Surveillance System (SOSUS). The laboratory was adjacent to the Naval Facility (NAVFAC) Bermuda and was the only Atlantic R&D laboratory with access to an operational SOSUS facility. As a result, partly due to cover story of the NAVFAC as "oceanographic research" the two were often associated and confused as a single entity.) Later the tower was used for additional acoustic experiments as well as oceanographic observations, wave height measurements, optical observations, air containment measurements and measurements of the effects of the ocean environment on the structure itself.

The Tudor Hill Laboratory was the terminus for a number of undersea systems supporting both passive and active sonar development and environmental and oceanographic acoustical research with shore facilities also available to visiting researchers of Navy projects with suitable clearances and funding. The laboratory was the only Atlantic Navy research and development facility with direct access to an operational Sound Surveillance System (SOSUS) facility, the adjacent Naval Facility Bermuda, (Note: When the Tudor Hill Laboratory and its detachment were disestablished 30 September 1990 its facilities were assigned to the Naval Facility which was then decommissioned two years later. (Merrill & Wyld 1997)) allowing studies and evaluation of operational hardware. Data from the laboratory's experimental sensors was originally sent from the tower terminals to the laboratory by cable until replaced by microwave link. The laboratory had assigned vessels to serve the tower and conduct research, including the R/V Erline, a 105 ft (32.0 m) former oil field crew boat. In 1964 the tower was used to support the Navy's Sea Lab I.

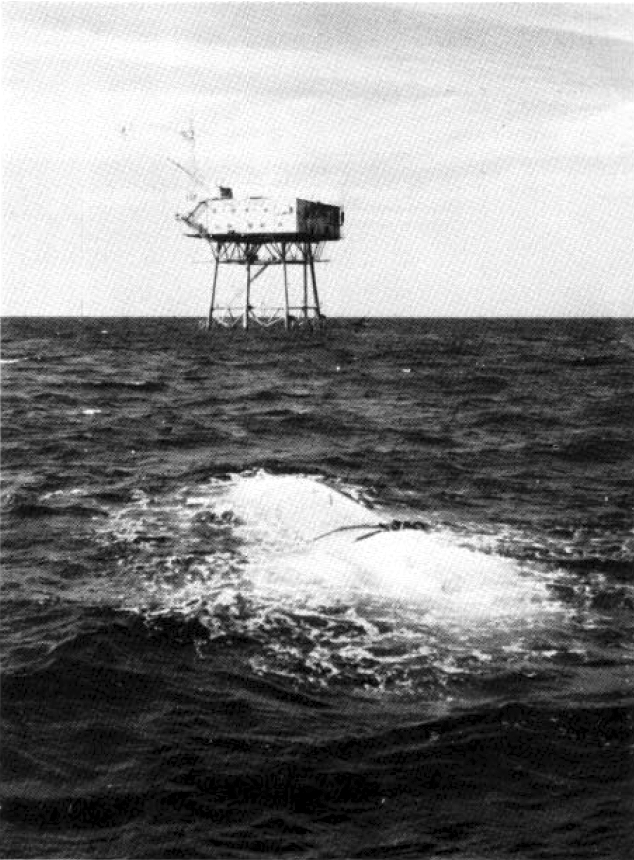
SEALAB I off Bermuda in 1964

The tower was supported before Erline's acquisition in 1967 by MAC III. The support included regular supply of JP-5 fuel for the tower's diesels brought in 500 US gallons (1,900 L) bladders.

The tower was four-legged with a two-story platform for crew quarters, instrumentation and support services. The tower had fuel storage, crane and a helicopter pad. The design was intended to withstand a wave height of 70 feet (21.3 m), but in its early years the tower was damaged by waves approaching the design height. Typical minimum staffing by contract personnel was eight persons, including electronic technicians, mechanics and housekeeping staff.

The prefabricated tower was designed, built and installed in 1960 by J. Ray McDermott & Company of New Orleans. In July 1966 the program was transferred to the Manager, Antisubmarine Warfare Project Office and technical responsibility transferred to the Naval Research Laboratory (NRL). The research program was suspended on 30 June 1970 with occasional daytime inspections and maintenance work by NRL personnel. On 13 May 1976 the tower was toppled by demolition charges after which Erline conducted a fine grain grid survey to confirm no portion of the tower remained above the 100 ft (30.5 m) level. On 12 June a Notice to Mariners noted it as an obstruction covered by 16 fathoms (29.3 m).

== Bibliography ==
- Flato, Matthew (1976). Argus Island Tower 1960 to 1976 (PDF). Washington: Naval Research Laboratory. Archived from the original on May 21, 2015.
- Merrill, John; Wyld, Lionel D. (1997). Meeting the Submarine Challenge: A Short History of the Naval Underwater Systems Center. Washington, D.C.: Government Printing Office. p. 274—277. LCCN 97203061.
