= Michelangelo Pisani di Massa e di Mormile =

Italian diplomat (1928–2018)

Michelangelo Pisani Massamormile

Personal details
- Born: 24 March 1933 (age 93) Napoli
- Occupation: Diplomat

Michelangelo Pisani di Massa e di Mormile (24 March 1933), count of Massa Lubrense and Mormile, is an Italian diplomat.

== Biography ==
He graduated in law in 1954 and entered the diplomatic career in 1960.

During his career, he was posted to the Permanent Representation of Italy to the United Nations in New York, at the Consulate of Grenoble and at the Italian embassies in Bogotà and Tel Aviv. In 1971 he was nominated as Consul General in Hong Kong and in 1980 he was at the Italian Embassy in Washington. He served as Italian Ambassador to Chile from 1989 to 1995.

From 1995 to 1997 he was Ambassador of Italy to Turkey.

He retired from the diplomatic career in 1998.

== Honors ==
Grand Officer of the Order of Merit of the Italian Republic – December 27, 1985

== See also ==
- Ministry of Foreign Affairs (Italy)
- Foreign relations of Italy

Preceded by n/a - post resumed in 1989	Ambassador of Italy to Chile; 1989–1995	Succeeded by Emanuele Costa
Preceded by Luigi Maria Fontana Giusti	Ambassador of Italy to Turkey; 1995–1997	Succeeded by Massimiliano Bandini
