= USNS Mission Capistrano =

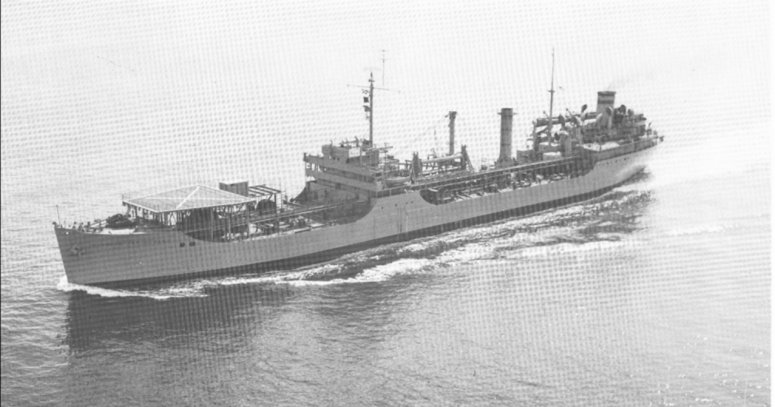
- USNS Mission Capistrano (AO-112)

History

United States
- Namesake: Mission San Juan Capistrano
- Builder: Marinship, Sausalito, California
- Yard number: 43
- Laid down: 29 February 1944
- Launched: 7 May 1944
- Acquired: 14 June 1944
- Reclassified: (AG-162), 1 July 1960
- Stricken: 1 January 1955
- Identification: IMO number: 7517466
- Fate: Sold to Mission Drilling & Exploration Corp, New Orleans, LA, 15 Mar 1973; Scrapped, 1980-82

General characteristics
- Displacement: 5,532 tons (light); 21,880 tons (full)
- Length: 524 ft 0 in (160 m)
- Beam: 68 ft 0 in (21 m)
- Draft: 30 ft 0 in (9 m)
- Propulsion: Turbo-electric, single screw
- Speed: 16.5 knots (31 km/h)
- Complement: 52 mariners
- Armament: 2 x 5 in (2x1), 8 x 20mm (8x1) (WWII)

SS Mission Capistrano was a Type T2-SE-A2 tanker built for the United States Maritime Commission during World War II. After the war she was acquired by the United States Navy as USS Mission Capistrano (AO-112). Later the tanker transferred to the Military Sea Transportation Service as USNS Mission Capistrano (T-AO-112). She was a Mission Buenaventura-class oiler and was named for San Juan Capistrano in San Juan Capistrano, California.

== Career ==
Originally laid down on 29 February 1944 as a Maritime Commission type (T2-SE-A2) tanker hull (MC hull 1819) under a Maritime Commission contract as SS Mission Capistrano at the Marinship Corporation in Sausalito, California; launched on 7 May 1944; sponsored by Mrs. James E. George; and delivered on 14 June 1944. Chartered to Pacific Tankers Inc., she spent the rest of the War supporting allied forces overseas (during which time she was awarded the National Defense Service Medal), until returned to the Maritime Commission on 20 April 1946 and laid up at the Maritime Commission Reserve Fleet at Mobile, Alabama. Acquired by the Navy on 17 November 1947, she was designated as Mission Capistrano (AO‑112) and transferred to the Naval Transportation Service for duty. She served with this service until 1 October 1949 when the Naval Transportation Service was absorbed into the new Military Sea Transportation Service (MSTS) and laid up at the Beaumont, Texas, Reserve Fleet.

Redesignated USNS Mission Capistrano (T‑AO‑112), she was transferred to the operational control of MSTS on the same date. She continued her service with MSTS until 1 January 1955 when she was placed out of service, struck from the Naval Vessel Register, and transferred to the Maritime Administration and laid up at the Beaumont, Texas Reserve Fleet. Reacquired by the Navy on 5 July 1956, she was transferred to MSTS on the same date and placed in service for further duty with MSTS. She continued her voyages along the world's tanker routes transporting oil to and from the United States until early 1960, when she entered the Todd Pacific Shipyards at New Orleans, Louisiana for conversion to a "Sound Testing Ship." Reclassified USNS Mission Capistrano (AG‑162) on 1 July 1960 she was modified to carry an ultra‑high‑powered sonar transducer array some five stories high and several tons in weight. The transducer could be raised and lowered like a centerboard through the ship's bottom. Upon completion of her conversion, she was placed in service as USNS Mission Capistrano (T-AG-162) (date unknown) and joined "Project Artemis," a project intended to ultimately produce a system that could detect submarines at long range.

Transferred to the Maritime Administration for lay up in the "National Defense Reserve Fleet," Mission Capistrano was sold by the Maritime Administration (MARAD) for commercial purposes in 1972 and converted to a "drill ship." Renamed Mission Exploration by 1975, she was scrapped 5 years later in Brownsville, Texas.

== Falcon Lady ==
Another tanker, constructed in the 1970s and initially named Falcon Lady, was later renamed Mission Capistrano. It is part of the "Ready Reserve Force" fleet located near Beaumont, Texas. Because of the similar name it can be confused with the 1940s Mission Capistrano.

== Bibliography ==
- Anderson, Richard M. (1986). "Question 12/85". Warship International. XXIII (3): 312. ISSN 0043-0374.
