= Project Artemis =

1960s US Navy sonar research project

Project Artemis was a United States Navy acoustics research and development experiment from the late 1950s into the mid 1960s to test a potential low-frequency active sonar system for ocean surveillance. The at-sea testing began in 1960 after research and development in the late 1950s. The project's test requirement was to prove detection of a submerged submarine at 500 nmi (580 mi; 930 km). The experiment, covering a number of years, involved a large active element and a massive receiver array.

Artemis receiving field array module as implemented 1963.

The receiving array was a field of modules forming a three dimensional array laid from 1961 to 1963 on the slopes of a seamount, the Plantagenet Bank (31.983333°N 65.183333°W), off Bermuda. The modules, attached to ten lines of cable, were 57 ft (17.4 m) masts with floats on top to keep them upright. Each module mounted sets of hydrophones. The receiving array terminated at Argus Island, built on the seamount's top, with data processed at the laboratory that was also constructed for the project. The laboratory was then the Bermuda Research Detachment of the Navy Underwater Sound Laboratory.

The active source array was to be suspended at 1,000 m (3,280.8 ft) to 1,050 m (3,444.9 ft) from the former tanker Mission Capistrano. The 1440-element active array had a one megawatt acoustic output (180 dB) with a center frequency of 400 Hz.

Though Artemis failed the final test and resulted in no operational system, it set the agenda for research in ocean acoustics and engineering such systems for the future.

== Background ==
World War II experience prompted the U.S. Navy to examine the threat of Soviet submarines which had been improved by captured German technology. As a result of the threat being considered high risk sonic detection became a top priority. The Navy approached the National Science Foundation's Committee for Undersea Warfare for advice. Following the recommendations the Navy established a study under Massachusetts Institute of Technology auspices designated Project Hartwell which in 1950 recommended development of a long range passive acoustic detection system. By 13 November 1950 a letter contract had been issued to Western Electric to develop the bottom array system exploiting low frequencies. A test array was laid in the Bahamas off Eleuthera and upon successful tests with a U.S. submarine an order for six such systems was issued in 1952. The Sound Surveillance System (SOSUS), its name and purpose classified, was given the unclassified name Project Caesar to cover its development and maintenance. In 1956, as the last of the Atlantic SOSUS systems were being installed, Chief of Naval Operations Admiral Arleigh Burke convened a summer study similar to the Hartwell study designated the Nobska Study coordinated by the Committee on Undersea Warfare. Admiral Burke was particularly concerned with the threat of Soviet nuclear submarines in light of the capabilities of the nuclear submarine Nautilus had been demonstrated.

Much of the study focused on undersea warfare and the need for nuclear anti-submarine submarines but also, in looking at SOSUS, recommended research and development of potential long range, active sonar systems. It also focused on the need to understand the ocean environment. A particular area of investigation was whether an active system could be developed with the power and directivity to exploit ocean zones the passive system being installed might not. With respect to the Navy active sonar project designated Artemis, to run from 1958 to 1963, an understanding of the ocean environment was vital. If the project was to succeed the full efforts of every ocean scientist, technician and laboratory on the Atlantic coast was likely required yet there were only six to seven hundred such people that were qualified. The need to meet that requirement and long term antisubmarine needs of the Navy drove large increases in academic and research budgets for oceanography.

As Project Artemis was undergoing tests in the early 1960s SOSUS tracked the first U.S. ballistic missile submarine George Washington across the Atlantic in 1961. In June 1962 SOSUS made the first detection and classification of a Soviet diesel submarine, and during the Cuban Missile Crisis in October tracked Soviet Foxtrot-class submarine with correlated sighting by aircraft. On 6 July 1962 the SOSUS array terminating at Barbados demonstrated detection range by identifying a Soviet nuclear submarine transiting off Norway.

== Project overview ==
A commercial contractor had proposed a long range, active sonar surveillance system to the Navy but a review by Hudson Laboratories showed there were flaws in the basic numbers upon which the proposal looked feasible. Frederick V. (Ted) Hunt of Harvard had proposed that a goal should be a scan of "an ocean an hour" that was based on the sound speed in seawater so that 3600 seconds equals 3600 miles so that round trip travel time would allow surveillance of an entire ocean from mid ocean. Though the consensus was that contractor's proposed system would not work as conceived there were possibilities something in the field of active sonar could work to meet Hunt's concept. Artemis, Greek goddess of the hunt, was given to the project as a name for that relationship, making it unusual in not being a code word or acronym. Project Artemis experimental and system development effort's goal was to define requirements for a long range, low frequency, active, sonar capable of detecting a submerged submarine at about 500 nmi (580 mi; 930 km). The concept was a possible undersea equivalent of the Arctic Distant Early Warning (DEW) radar system. A secondary objective was to define the techniques and problems in fixing such arrays in fixed bottom locations for an operational system.

Artemis involved nearly the entire national acoustics community at the time. A Bell Telephone Laboratories (BTL) (Note: BTL was the research and development principal for technology used in the Sound Surveillance System (SOSUS). Western Electric Company, another Bell entity, was the prime contractor for SOSUS.) representative initially reviewed plans with a research committee established to continue review of plans and progress. Hudson Laboratories, directed by Dr. Robert Frosch, had been established by the Office of Naval Research to balance Navy laboratories with interests in systems. Hudson Laboratories was the prime contractor for the project with Dr. Frosch as Chief Scientist of Project Artemis. He was followed by Dr. Alan Berman, the laboratory's Associate Director, as Hudson's Director and Chief Scientist of Project Artemis. The Artemis Research Committee chaired by BTL included members from the Marine Physical Laboratory of Scripps Institution of Oceanography, Naval Ocean Systems Center, both based in San Diego, Naval Underwater Systems Center, Naval Research Laboratory, Hudson Labs, IBM and others oversaw and coordinated technical matters. Contractors ranged from Western Electric and General Electric companies to small study contracts to General Atronics Corporation.

The acoustic propagation paths as understood at the time, operating depths of submarines and ray tracing for sound velocity conditions as understood in the Atlantic determined that the sound source depth should be at 1,000 m (3,280.8 ft) to 1,050 m (3,444.9 ft) with a center frequency of 400 Hz. The transmitting array deployment evolved from a fixed bottom site, a deployment from an anchored or tethered ship with the final decision that it was to be deployed by the converted tanker Mission Capistrano which would be equipped with station keeping capability.

Artemis receiver field diagram as implemented 1963.

The 10,000 element, three dimensional, receiver array was composed of elements laid in a field as 210 modular masts in ten strings with an additional horizontal line on the slopes of Plantagenet Bank off Bermuda between 1961 and 1963. The Bermuda Research Detachment was established with a building on Tudor Hill adjacent to Naval Facility Bermuda and the Argus Island offshore tower was built for termination of Artemis receiver cables.

A test was made, after several years of development, with a submarine at the design range of 1,000 km and fitted with a transponder reacting to the active array's signal for reference. The Artemis system failed the test. Station keeping issues of the active array ship, degradation of the receiving system modules and poorly understood ocean acoustics were involved in the failure.

Collapsed Module.

No operational system resulted from the effort but it defined the limitations of technology and understanding of underwater acoustics of the time. In particular understanding of scattering and reverberation was shown to be lacking. The Artemis receiving array was expected to demonstrate problems with multipath reflections but experienced considerable failure with floats upon which its configuration relied. Surveys by the submersible Alvin in 1966 and 1967 found multiple float failures with collapsed modules and other damage to standing modules.

The major technological limitation was found to be computing capability, particularly speed, that forced use of analog devices for beam steering and signal processing. Results in acoustics formed the basis for extensive ocean acoustics research going forward after the project's termination in the mid 1960s. The project successfully proved techniques for developing and deploying high powered, phased active hydrophone arrays.

== Passive receiving array ==
Module connection to cable.

The receiving array, just as with the source, underwent significant changes from planning to the final test configuration. It was a three dimensional system of hydrophones laid by cable ships on the slope of the Plantagnet Bank seamount. The array cables terminated at Argus Island, the tower erected for the project on the bank. The tower passed the data to the laboratory built and staffed for the project at Tudor Hill, Bermuda.

=== Undersea array ===
The passive receive array field consisted of ten parallel cables with 210 modules composed of 57 ft (17.4 m) masts mounting hydrophones. The cables were laid down the slope of Plantagenet Bank (Note: Plantagenet Bank is often referred to as Argus Bank.) in Bermuda. A 1961 array was to the north east of and parallel to array field string number one and a horizontal string, across the slope, was at right angles to the field at about 3,000 ft (914.4 m). The receiving field was approximately on the sound channel axis laid between 2,000 ft (609.6 m) and 6,000 ft (1,828.8 m). (Note: Sources, some recollections, others more specific, vary on depths. The Alvin dive records have clear statements concerning maximum dive depth of 6,000 feet and deep end of strings.)

The strings were laid on the side of the bank using the U.S. Navy large covered lighter YFNB-12, reconfigured with a long overhead boom to handle the masts. Each cable had special takeouts built into it at intervals from which wires to the hydrophones were connected. Each mast was clamped onto the special cable with takeouts. At the upper end of the approximately 4-inch (100 mm) cable a wire rope was attached and led to an explosively embedded anchor shot into the flat coral top of Plantagenet Bank. Tension of more than 40,000 lb was applied to the wire rope and cable to lay it down the side of the bank in the straightest line possible. At one point all further construction ceased while a stopper was placed on the special cable because most of the connection to the wire rope had broken and the string was being held by a few strands of wire on the double drum winch on YFNB-12. The YFNB-12 was held in place with four Murray and Tregurtha Diesel outboard engines placed on the corners and capable of 360 degree rotation, developing tremendous thrust in any direction. (Note: The information is from an anonymous personal recollection moved to Talk:Project Artemis in 2009. A reliable source describing the laying of the Artemis cables has not been found in extensive searches. The account does match the description of the masts and attachments to the cable adding credibility.)

=== Surface and shore components ===
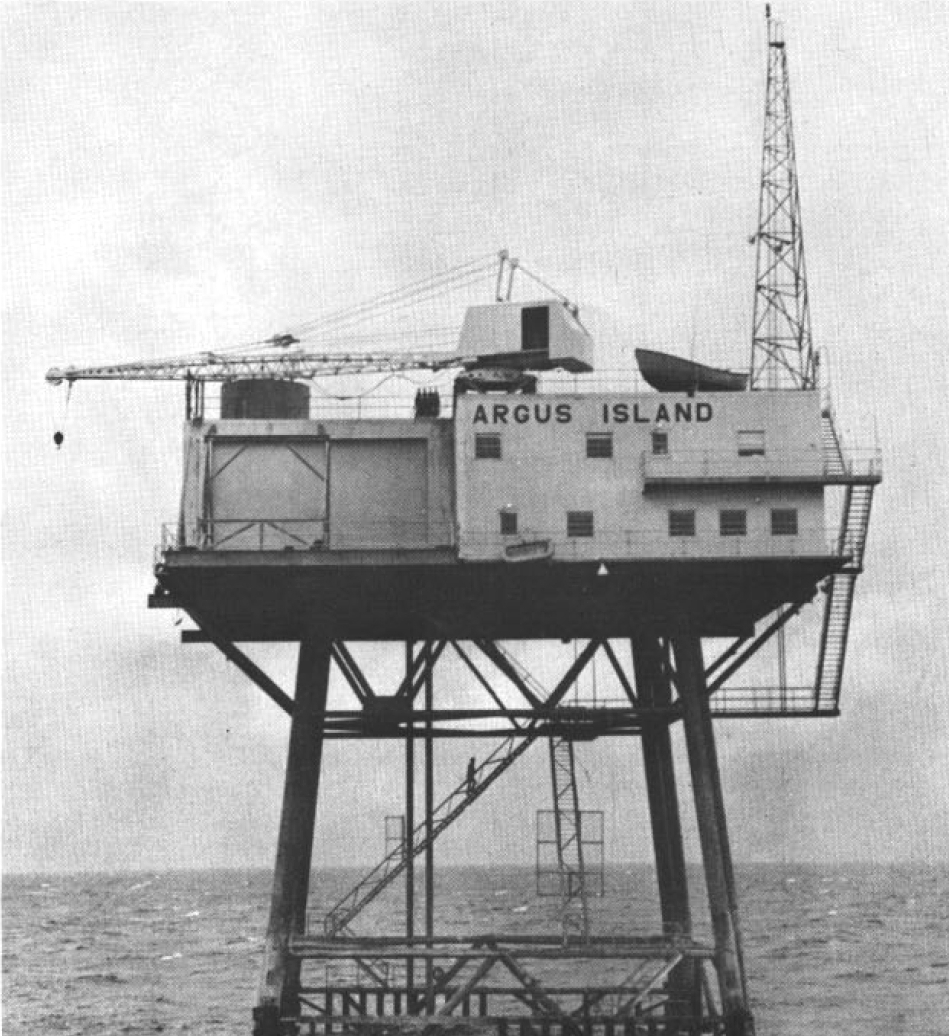
The Argus Island tower in 1963

The cables led to Argus Island tower(31.9498°N 65.1775°W), located about 24 miles (39 km) miles from Bermuda in 192 feet (59 m) of water and erected in 1960, from which the signal was conducted to the Naval Underwater Systems Center's Tudor Hill Laboratory located at Tudor Hill, Southampton, Bermuda (32.265417°N 64.878528°W). The tower and laboratory had first been connected by cable but was later connected by a microwave link. The laboratory had opened to support Project Artemis and Project Trident in 1961 as the Bermuda Research Detachment under the Navy Underwater Sound Laboratory. That facility was dedicated to acoustic, electromagnetic, environmental and ocean engineering research.

Tudor Hill Laboratory (upper right) and Naval Facility Bermuda (large building at left).

The laboratory was adjacent to Naval Facility Bermuda which was a classified operational Sound Surveillance System (SOSUS) shore terminus. The Tudor Hill Laboratory continued in operation until 30 September 1990 and was the only Atlantic Navy laboratory with access to an operational SOSUS system for research. The facilities were transferred to the Naval Facility with the understanding that NUSC would be provided support should a research need arise. (Note: Naval Facility Bermuda itself was closed 30 September 1992.)

After the project and facilities had been transferred in 1966 with a later transfer of responsibilities to the Naval Research Laboratory in 1969 the Argus Island tower underwent an extensive structural review and repair cost estimates. The acoustic program review also showed the tower at its useful end. As a result the tower was slated for removal. Before demolition the sea cables terminating in the tower were tagged for identification and cut. In May 1976 the tower was toppled by demolitions. The tower's demolition removed a major navigation aid for sport fisherman.

== Active source array ==
The Artemis steering committee elected to produce a one megawatt acoustic output (120 dB) active source. On 12 May 1958 the Office of Naval Research (ONR) Advisory Group for High Power, Deep Under- water Sound Source met and issued a report on 17 July that resulted in a general specification by The Naval Research Laboratory (NRL) issued on 9 September. Five companies responded with widely varying proposals. One conclusion from review of the proposals was the necessity of having a backup of a second transducer design.

A fixed bottom site at Eleuthera had been considered with surveys done seeking such a site but the site was changed to Plantagenet Bank which was too far from Bermuda to make power and system cables economical. The deployment, support and operation from a ship then became specified.

The problems of power, amplification, instrumentation and other support were engineering problems that were relatively easily managed. The transducers for the array itself and its handling systems required pushing the state-of-the-art into entirely new areas of research and development. Magnetostrictive and electromagnetic transducers were considered for the array itself with low power ceramic transducers to be used for the experimental use in developing the array. On 4 December 1958 Bendix Corporation was contracted through Hudson Laboratories to develop and produce a magnetostrictive transducer and on 28 August 1959 the first Massa transducer was delivered to NRL. Despite redesign the Bendix effort on the magnetostrictive transducer was unsuccessful, though the last model was retained as backup, and that effort was terminated on 8 June 1960 with replacement by Massa. The final design then settled on a large, 1440-transducer element "billboard" array of transducers.

Individual elements passed tests but demonstrated problems when assembled into modules and the array itself due to mutual interference. An element with slightly lower radiation resistance would absorb power from higher power elements and fail to be followed by the next lower power element in a cascading failure that particularly damaged elements away from the array's edges. The Naval Research Laboratory had both a theoretical study and an active experimental program seeking a solution. The experimental study involved modules of the elements in test configurations using the USS Hunting to help determine the final array configuration. Ultimately transducers were replaced by electromechanical elements termed "shaker boxes" to reduce those failures. The array could not attain full power due to nonuniform displacement across the face of array at higher power. The problem of inter element coupling and cascading failure was never fully solved.

USNS Mission Capistrano undergoing conversion showing Project ARTEMIS active source array well.

The World War II tanker Mission Capistrano was selected and modified for deploying the array. The T2 tanker hull had sufficient space and structural integrity to allow installing array power and control systems and creating a large center well through which the array could be housed, lowered and operated. On 28 August 1958 specifications for conversion were completed with a contract for conversion with Avondale Marine Ways let on 7 January 1960. The ship engaged in array tests and was further modified until 3 November 1962 when the array was removed at Philadelphia Naval Shipyard and the ship released for other work until re-installation the next March.

The mutual element interference problems resulted in redesign and re engineering that continued past the Bermuda experimental period to the end of the formal Artemis experiments. For example the array was tested in the Northwest Providence Channel, Bahamas, from 19 July through 3 August 1964 after the array elements' connections had been changed to all parallel rather than combined series-parallel connections to reduce the interference problems. The array was tested at frequencies from 350 to 500 cycles per second in steps. The array was then put through an endurance run at 350, 415, 430, and 450 cycles per second for two hours at power levels of 120, 200, 300 and 450 kilowatts. The maximum power could not be attained and element deflections continued to be a problem.

=== Array description for original experiment ===
Source transducer array on USNS Mission Capistrano (mid-1960s).

The source array was 54 ft (16 m) high, 44.5 ft (13.6 m) wide, and 22.5 ft (6.9 m) thick at bottom. Combined with a support structure for the array itself the source assembly was 75.5 ft (23.0 m) high with a weight of 690,000 pounds (310,000 kg). The face of the array was tilted upward at eleven degrees so as to insonify the desired ocean layers from the 1,200 ft (370 m) operation depth finally selected. The transducer elements were cubes of 1 ft (0.30 m) weighing 160 pounds (73 kg) assembled in 72 element modules six elements wide by twelve elements high. Those modules were then assembled on the array in five module components stacked in four horizontal rows. The optimal center frequency of 400 Hz proved in tests to be optimized with the actual modules at approximately 385 Hz and 405 Hz.

The array assembly also had electrical equipment required to make the electrical connection between array transducers and the transmission cable and for measurement and control functions that were housed in tanks at the bottom of the array assembly. At the top of the structure were four hydrophones in three coordinate axes that provided array orientation relative to acoustic positioning hydrophones.

The array development and tests continued after the main experiment at Bermuda in an effort to resolve issues with high powered active sources.

=== Ship modifications ===
Equipment arrangement on USNS Mission Capistrano.

Original plans envisioned a platform that could be capable of handling the source array as a mobile unit for tests and then both fix the array to the bottom and then provide power and control of the array when moored on Plantagenet Bank. The requirements included the capability to moor the ship above the fixed site, lower a foundation and affix it to the bottom using existing ocean drilling and cementing methods.

The most significant modification to Mission Capistrano was the system for operating the source array at the required depth of 1,200 ft (365.8 m) through a large center well. The well was 30 ft (9.1 m) wide by 48 ft (14.6 m) long (Note: References differ on dimensions. The general historical discussion of the project (Erskine) has the well dimensions as 40 by 60 feet. The dimensions stated in formal, contemporary technical reports (McClinton) are used.) with bottom closure when the array was raised by means of a rolling door on the long axis. The door was designed to prevent surging in the well while the ship was underway but did not seal the opening. In stowed position the array was held by supports with stabilizers to prevent motion of the array while stowed. When deployed the array was supported by 2.75 in (7.0 cm) wire rope attached to cable machinery located in forward holds running over winches located on deck fore and aft of the well and superstructure. The supporting cables and the electrical cables ran over special roller devices designed to dampen ship motion that would be transferred to the deployed array.

A number of power options, including nuclear, were considered early in the program. The array, as evolved for the main experiment, was powered by a gas turbine generating plant capable of producing three phase, 60 cycle current and rated at 8,000 kilowatts at 4160 volts located aft of the ship's array well. Controls protected the gas turbine from rapid load variance from 800 kw base to 8,000 full and to keep voltage variation at less than 2% and frequency variation at less than 1%. The ship's main propulsion turbine generator could also provide 6890 kilowatts at 3500 volts through a 3500/4160 Volt transformer. Forward of the array well was an amplifier room with the controls, switching mechanisms, transformers, instrumentation and electronic amplifiers to drive the transducers in the array. The gas turbine power plant was removed after construction of a fixed bottom site for the source array was eliminated and the element interaction issues forced reduced array power so that the ship's steam turbine provided sufficient power. All the modifications made for construction and installation of the array at a bottom site, drilling equipment, foundation construction support and the helicopter platform were removed.

For successful tests the position of the source array in relation to the receiving array had to be accurately known and maintained. The specified orientation of the source also had to be maintained. A deep ocean moor with the ship maintaining heading within the moor was originally planned. To maintain ship's heading within the moor a 500-shaft horsepower electric driven controllable reversible-pitch propeller was installed in a transverse tunnel located in the forward peak tank as far forward as possible. The manufacturer rated the system's static thrust at 13,200 pounds. A system with a minimum of 10,000 pounds thrust was determined from information based on smooth water operation of a 500 horsepower, 13,600 pounds thruster installed in the similar sized vessel J.R. Sensibar. That information indicated such a thruster could twist the ship and maintain heading in moderate weather within a few degrees of required heading. Tests at dockside showed the actual thruster installation could provide 11,250 pounds static thrust.

In actual use at sea in mild sea conditions the thruster could twist the ship at eighteen degrees per minute. In 15 kn (17 mph; 28 km/h) wind, 6 ft (1.8 m) swell with 5 ft (1.5 m) waves the thruster could twist the ship to any heading and maintain that within one degree. The mooring system was used thirty-eight times over twenty-seven months but was not satisfactory. It was slow, cumbersome and anchors sometimes failed to hold. Assistance of tugs was found to be fairly successful but tugs were not always available. As a result the movement of the ship introduced doppler distortions that were unpredictable to the active array. A dynamic positioning system of eight large outboard engines and station keeping on a bottom fixed transducer was planned. The project was terminated before the advanced ship station keeping and positioning system was implemented.

== Feasibility of permanent installation ==
The results of the experiments showed that the high power source was not at a developmental stage to develop the desired power. The large masts and unwieldy components of the receiving array, though reasonably successful and use continued beyond the scheduled experiment, were subject to failure. The experiment showed that knowledge of ocean acoustics required considerable advancement. The tests indicated that such a system was possible but considerable development would be required. Projected expenses were massive. Robert Frosch noted the Navy wanted the knowledge obtained but was not going to build systems. Gordon Hamilton observed funding such a system "would have been horrendous."

Those factors combined with the fact that SOSUS was more than effective in detecting submarines resulted in it remaining an experiment.

== Political context ==
In 1959 the Soviet Union was deploying its first generation Intercontinental Ballistic Missiles, R-7 Semyorka. They were capable of delivering its payload at around 8,800 km, with an accuracy (CEP) of around 5 km. A single nuclear warhead was carried with a nominal yield of 3 megatons of TNT. However, they were very new and turned out to be very unreliable.

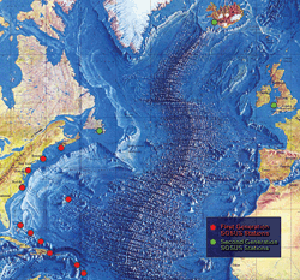
First SOSUS sensors

K-19, the first Russian ballistic missile submarine was commissioned on 30 April 1961. The military at that time considered the single greatest security threat to the USA the possibility of a submarine-delivered nuclear warhead placed near a major American city. Artemis was considered part of an underwater Defense Early Warning system. However, it was discovered that the Soviet boats were particularly noisy. Rapid advances in computer technology and the development of signal processing algorithms, such as the Fast Fourier transform, quickly gave the West the superior military position using multiple passive SOSUS arrays. In 1961, SOSUS tracked USS George Washington from the United States to the United Kingdom. The next year SOSUS detected and tracked the first Soviet Diesel submarine.

The Artemis active systems were eventually retired, since the passive systems proved adequate to detecting submarines that threatened the American coast. Largely because of the spy ring operated by John Anthony Walker in 1968, and the development of the submarine-launched intercontinental ballistic missiles, the need to send ballistic submarines directly to the American coast diminished. The Soviet Union began to rely more on a Bastion, whereby the latest generation of SSBN was deployed only in well-protected nearby waters. A mobile surveillance capability, called SURTASS, was developed in the mid-1970s. This system passed Operational Evaluation (OPEVAL) in 1980 and the ships began to be deployed. By 1985 Soviet naval exercises in the North Sea were using as many as a 100 vessels, including attack submarines. Chief of Naval Operations enacted the Urgent Anti-Submarine Research Program (CUARP), whose centerpiece was to activate the SURTASS fleet with a low-frequency system, and to develop tactics for such a system. The mobile system was considerably smaller than the Artemis transducer array, weighing roughly one-sixth as much.

With the diminished threat of the Atlantic SSBN, vessels were equipped with Surveillance Towed Array Sensor System and deployed in the Pacific. New generations of Attack submarines and Ballistic missile submarines were being deployed by several countries. The low frequency active system is currently being deployed on the USNS Impeccable.

== References cited ==
- Erskine, Fred T. III (August 2013). A History of the Acoustics Division of the Naval Research Laboratory The First Eight Decades 1923—2008 (PDF) (Report). Washington, D.C.: Naval Research Laboratory. Archived (PDF) from the original on 10 June 2020.
- Ferris, R. H. (15 September 1965). Tests of the Project Artemis Acoustic Source (PDF) (Report). Washington, D.C.: U.S. Naval Research Laboratory. Archived (PDF) from the original on 20 November 2021.
- Flato, Matthew (1976). Argus Island Tower 1960 to 1976 (Report). Washington: Naval Research Laboratory. Archived from the original on 21 May 2015.
- Frosch, Robert Alan (1981). "Oral History interview with Robert Alan Frosch". Niels Bohr Library & Archives—Oral History Interviews. College Park, MD: American Institute of Physics.
- Hamilton, Gordon (1996). "Oral History interview with Gordon Hamilton - Session II". Niels Bohr Library & Archives—Oral History Interviews. College Park, MD: American Institute of Physics.
- "Integrated Undersea Surveillance System (IUSS) History 1950 - 2010". IUSS/CAESAR Alumni Association.
- McClinton, A. T. (8 March 1962). Project Artemis Acoustic Source — Description and Characteristics of the Facility as Installed on the USNS MISSION CAPISTRANO (T-AG 162) (PDF) (Report). Washington, D.C.: U.S. Naval Research Laboratory. Archived (PDF) from the original on 22 February 2022.
- McClinton, A. T. (7 September 1967). Project Artemnis Acoustic Source Summary Report (PDF) (Report). Washington, D.C.: U.S. Naval Research Laboratory. Archived (PDF) from the original on 11 June 2020.
- Merrill, John; Wyld, Lionel D. (1997). Meeting the Submarine Challenge: A Short History of the Naval Underwater Systems Center. Washington, D.C.: Government Printing Office. pp. 274–277. LCCN 97203061.
- Mullarkey, William E.; Cobb, A. Donn (1 October 1966). Artemis Module Field Survey by Alvin (Report). New London, CT: U.S. Naval Underwater Sound Laboratory.
- Shor, Elizabeth N., ed. (June 1997). Seeking Signals in the Sea (PDF). San Diego, CA: Marine Physical Laboratory, Scripps Institution of Oceanography, University of California, San Diego.
- Urick, R. J. (4 November 1974). Signal Coherence in the Sea and the Gain of a Receiving Array (Report). Silver Spring, MD: U.S. Naval Surface Weapons Center, White Oak Laboratory.
- Weir, Gary E. (2001). An Ocean in Common: American Naval Officers, Scientists, and the Ocean Environment. College Station, Texas: Texas A&M University Press. ISBN 1-58544-114-7. LCCN 00011707.
- Whitman, Edward C. (Winter 2005). "SOSUS The "Secret Weapon" of Undersea Surveillance". Undersea Warfare. Vol. 7, no. 2. Archived from the original on 11 December 2015.
