= Naval Facility Bermuda =

Naval Facility Bermuda (large building at left) and Tudor Hill Laboratory (upper right).

Naval Facility Bermuda, or NAVFAC Bermuda, was the operational shore terminus for one of the Atlantic Sound Surveillance System (SOSUS) array systems installed during the first phase of system installation and in commission from 1955 until 1992. The true surveillance mission was classified and covered by "oceanographic research" until the mission was declassified in 1991. The system's acoustic data was collected after the facility was decommissioned until the system was routed to the central processing facility, the Naval Ocean Processing Facility (NOPF), Dam Neck, Virginia in 1994.

The operational surveillance facility was often confused with the adjacent research facility, the Tudor Hill Laboratory, and its undersea sensors supporting research and development for Navy acoustic systems. That laboratory was the only such research and development facility with access to an operational surveillance facility. When that laboratory, then a detachment of the Naval Underwater Systems Center, was disestablished 30 September 1990 its facilities were assigned to the Naval Facility which was then decommissioned two years later. The Tudor Hill area in the British Imperial fortress colony of Bermuda had been one of the locations where the Bermuda Base Command (established by the United States to reinforce the Bermuda Garrison of the British Army) had emplaced United States Army Coast Artillery Corps batteries during the Second World War. The battery still remains, although the guns were removed on the conclusion of the war. Although United States Army defences were withdrawn from Bermuda, the United States Naval Operating Base Bermuda and the United States Army Air Forces' Kindley Field remained under 99-year base leases granted by the British Government.

== Naval Facility Bermuda ==
32°15′50.7″N 64°52′40.2″W

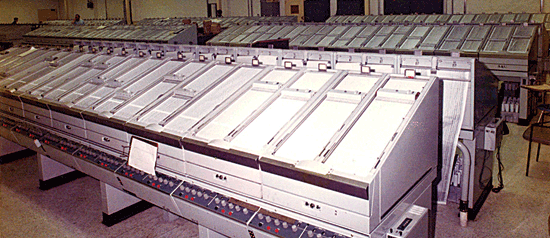
Lofargram writers on watch floor.

Naval Facility (NAVFAC) Bermuda was a shore terminus for SOSUS arrays, in which output of the array at sea was processed and displayed by means of the Low Frequency Analyzer and Recorder (LOFAR), commissioned 1 June 1955 as part of the first phase of Atlantic installations. The facility's mission was classified until 1991 when the cover story of "oceanographic research" was revealed as "surveillance."

The facility, with fifteen officers, 155 enlisted, two local civilian employees and resident contractor, was upgraded numerous times over its operational life of thirty-seven years. NAVFAC Bermuda was decommissioned as a command 30 September 1992. In 1994 the acoustic data from the system itself was routed directly to the Naval Ocean Processing Facility (NOPF), Dam Neck, Virginia. There was some hope that the base would survive the end of the Cold War, and the base closures of 1995. It was thought that it might be adapted to scientific purposes, for the monitoring of whales, but it was closed, instead, along with NAS Bermuda, and the NAS Annex.

== Tudor Hill Laboratory ==
32°15′55.5″N 64°52′42.7″W

NAVFAC Bermuda was often associated with and confused with the adjacent Naval Underwater Systems Center's Tudor Hill Laboratory which was engaged in acoustic research. The laboratory was a major facility and operated a number of acoustic research systems off Bermuda and the R/V Erline. The laboratory was built in the early 1960s as the Bermuda Research Detachment to support Project Artemis and Project Trident, an investigation into ocean acoustics that included a bottom mounted vertical array.

Among the better known facilities of the laboratory was the Argus Island platform built for Project Artemis. The Tudor Hill Laboratory was the terminus for a number of undersea systems supporting both passive and active sonar development and environmental and oceanographic acoustical research with shore facilities also available to visiting researchers of Navy projects with suitable clearances and funding. The laboratory was the only Atlantic Navy research and development facility with direct access to an operational SOSUS facility allowing studies and evaluation of operational hardware.

When the Naval Underwater Systems Center (NUSC) detachment and Tudor Hill Laboratory on Bermuda were shut down 30 September 1990 the facilities were transferred to the Naval Facility with the understanding that NUSC would be provided support should a research need arise.

== See also ==
- USN NAS Bermuda/NAS Annex, Morgans Point, 1941-1995
- USN NAS Bermuda, Kindley Field, 1970-1995
- USN Submarine Base, Ordnance Island, Bermuda. WWII
- Military of Bermuda
