= USS Hunting =

1945 LSM-1-class landing ship medium

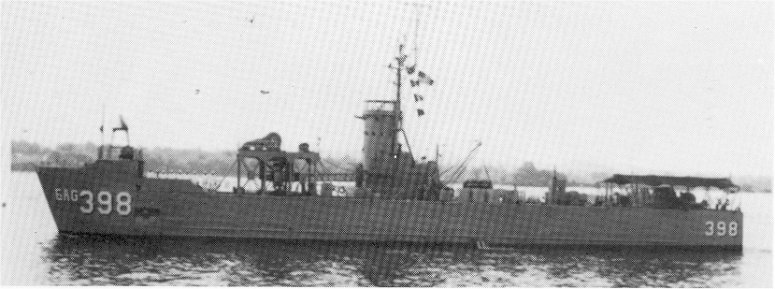
- USS Hunting following her 1954 conversion to a Sonar Research Ship

History

United States
- Name: LSM-398 (1945—1957); Hunting (1957—1962); Western Squaw (1966—1972); Sensibar Booster (1972—1983)
- Namesake: Hunting Island in South Carolina
- Owner: U.S. Navy (1945—1963); Commercial Manufacturing Co. (1963—1966); Western Contracting Co. (1966—1972); Construction Aggregates Co. (1972—1983)
- Ordered: 1944
- Builder: Charleston Navy Yard
- Laid down: 16 December 1944
- Launched: 6 January 1945
- Commissioned: 6 August 1945, as LSM-398
- Decommissioned: 23 November 1962
- Renamed: Hunting, 13 June 1957
- Reclassified: E-AG-398, 13 June 1957
- Refit: Converted to sonar research ship, June 1953-October 1954
- Identification: Official number: 506178 after Navy disposal
- Fate: Sold for scrapping, 30 July 1963; Registered as dredge 1966; Out of documentation 1983; Scrapped between 1983 and 1989

General characteristics
- Class & type: LSM-1-class landing ship medium
- Displacement: 1,095 long tons (1,113 t) full load
- Length: 203 ft 6 in (62.03 m) o/a
- Beam: 34 ft 6 in (10.52 m)
- Draft: Light : 3 ft 6 in (1.07 m) forward; 7 ft 8 in (2.34 m) aft; Full load : 6 ft 6 in (1.98 m) forward; 8 ft 3 in (2.51 m) aft
- Propulsion: 2 × General Motors (non-reversing with airflex clutch) diesels, direct drive with 1,440 bhp (1,074 kW) each at 720 rpm, twin screws
- Speed: 13.2 knots (24.4 km/h; 15.2 mph) (928 tons displacement)
- Range: 4,900 nmi (9,100 km) at 12 kn (22 km/h; 14 mph) (928 tons displacement)
- Capacity: 5 medium tank or 3 heavy tanks, or 6 LVT's, or 9 DUKW's
- Troops: 2 officers, 46 enlisted
- Complement: 5 officers, 54 enlisted
- Armament: 1 × single 40 mm; 4 × single 20 mm guns AA gun mounts
- Armor: 10-lb. STS splinter shield to gun mounts, pilot house and conning station

USS Hunting (E-AG-398) was built as the LSM-1-class landing ship medium LSM-398 at the Charleston Navy Yard and launched in the first week of 1945. After service in the Atlantic as a landing ship the vessel was converted in 1953 to a sonar research vessel for the Naval Research Laboratory. Hunting was unique among Navy research vessels of the time in having a center well through which large towed "fish" could be transported and lowered to operating depths. The work contributed to sonar improvements and understanding ocean acoustics.

After sale by the Navy in 1963 the vessel operated as a dredge until out of documentation in 1983.

== Landing ship (1945-1953) ==
Launched as the LSM-398 by the Charleston Navy Yard, on 6 January 1945; sponsored by Mrs. T. B. Thompson; and commissioned on 6 August 1945.

Based at Little Creek, Virginia, the ship operated as a part of the Amphibious Fleet in the Atlantic, taking part in many training assaults (such as "Exercise Seminole" in 1947) in the Caribbean Sea and on the Atlantic coast.

== Sonar research ship (1954-1959) ==
The Naval Research Laboratory's (NRL) Sonar Systems Branch began work on transducers operating at low frequences with specific test frequencies of 1, 5 and 10 kHz. Very large transducers were required for those frequencies. The transducers were to be towed and operated in exploration of the deep sound channel at about 1,000 m (3,280.8 ft). The transducer to be towed was 30,000 pounds (14,000 kg), 28 ft (8.5 m) long, 9 ft (2.7 m) wide, 10 ft (3.0 m) high and beyond the means of conventional over the side or stern launching. The solution was to modify the LSM assigned to NRL so that the towed vehicle could be launched and towed through a center well.

Conversion of LSM-398 began in June 1953 according to plans developed by Bureau of Ships at the Norfolk Naval Shipyard. A center well 30 ft (9.1 m) long by 12 ft (3.7 m) wide was cut through the centerline with an elevator carriage to house the towed body, or "fish", as it was raised and lowered through the well. A bridge above the well was the upper position of the carriage was 18 ft (5.5 m) above the main deck so that the well doors could be closed and the fish could be lowered to the main deck onto the closed doors. In the towing position the carriage would be locked at keel level and the fish towed at depth on a 2.5 in (6.4 cm) multiple conductor double armored cable with a breaking strength of 250,000 pounds (110,000 kg). The center well was a unique feature for Navy Research vessels at the time.

After conversion the LSM reported to Operational Development Force on 1 October 1954 to begin operations with NRL. LSM-398 was reclassified E-AG-398 and assigned the name Hunting on 13 June 1957. The ship's testing and evaluation activities took her from the Naval Research Laboratory near Washington into the Chesapeake Bay, the coastal waters off the Virginia Capes, and the Caribbean. She played a vital part in the development of new and better Navy sonar equipment.

The ship was used by the Naval Research Laboratory in tests of a subset of the transducer element modules for the active acoustic source for Project Artemis when the initial elements failed due to inter element coupling, nonuniform displacement across the face of array and element destruction.

Despite problems with the well design, wave action in the well and air compression under the doors causing them to lift off their tracks, the ship successfully towed equipment to depths of 15,000 ft (4,572.0 m) until engine failure too expensive to repair after a mistake during shipyard repairs led to the ship's retirement in 1959. An issue with the ship leading to retirement was corrosion of the hull under the engine compartment due to electrical currents in the water and incompatibility of World War II steel with more modern steel leading to cracking during attempted repairs. Ability to place and tow experimental equipment at desired depths led to major findings in ocean acoustics and understanding of convergence zones. The experience with the well contributed to the design of the improved well installed in USNS Mizar.

Hunting was decommissioned on 23 November 1962 at Portsmouth, Virginia and sold on 30 July 1963 to Commercial Manufacturing Corp., Kansas City, Missouri.

== Commercial dredge (1966-1983) ==
In 1966 the vessel was registered as Western Squaw with official number 506178 by the Western Contracting Corporation as a dredge. The dredge was based at Omaha, Nebraska and moved to St. Louis, Missouri in 1970 until sold in 1972 to Construction Aggregates Corporation and renamed Sensibar Booster. The dredge was then homeported in Wilmington, Delaware until out of documentation in 1983. The vessel was scrapped up between 1983 and 1989.
