= Plantagenet Bank =

Under-sea feature in the Atlantic Ocean

Coordinates: 31.983333°N 65.183333°W

The Plantagenet Bank is an under-sea feature in the Atlantic Ocean about 25 miles (40 kilometres) southwest of Bermuda.

The site was the home of the Argus Island research tower until May of 1976. The tower hosted several oceanographic research studies in the area focusing on currents.

The bank has significant carbonate deposits. It was studied in the early 1960s for its magnetic deviations which contribute to the lore of the Bermuda Triangle.

== Bibliography ==
- Flato, Matthew (1976). Argus Island Tower 1960 to 1976 (PDF). Washington: Naval Research Laboratory. Archived from the original on May 21, 2015.
