= Frank Massa =

American engineer

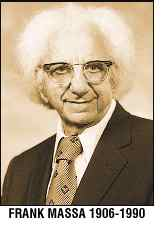

Frank Massa (1906–1990) was an American engineer who contributed to the development of the field of acoustical engineering. He is best known for the development of recorded sound technology for the film industry and during World War II, the development of the first towed sonar transducers and hydrophones used by the U.S. Navy to detect and defeat German U-boats.

== Overview ==
With a career that spanned 60 years, Massa registered over 140 patents, published scores of technical and scientific articles, and developed hundreds of new products for an array of applications in the field of electroacoustics. An article in Sea Technology referred to him as the "father of modern sonar transducer development."

Massa described himself as a production engineer. Though he was responsible for theorizing and developing a plethora of new technologies, he credited his work in manufacturing as being the most important thing in his growth as an engineer. Throughout his career, he extolled the merits of engineers remaining not in offices that tested new developments via mathematical models but rather weaving themselves into the manufacturing process to keep production efficient and product reliability high.

In a 1985 article in Sea Technology, Massa stated that in the beginning of his career, he was assigned, against his wishes, as a production manager. "I didn't know; then that was the first thing about production, and there I was in charge of it," he said. But his feelings toward the role quickly changed. "Those were the best years I ever spent, because I got to work with a dozen highly skilled production engineers who taught me the importance of being able to produce transducers as well as invent them." In a 1972 article in Under Sea Technology, he is described as "one of those rare individuals with the unique ability to quickly get to the basic elements of a problem and convert good ideas into reliable hardware."

== Early life ==
The son of an Italian immigrant mother, Massa was born in Boston during 1906 and did not speak English when he began the first grade. Massa went on to graduate from Revere High School, and was accepted at the Massachusetts Institute of Technology. He left for college with only $200 in dimes that his mother had saved for him.

Massa was able to graduate from MIT because of scholarships, and in 1927 he earned a Bachelor of Science degree in electrical engineering. After winning a Swope Fellowship, he continued at MIT to earn a master's degree in 1928.

After graduation, Massa accepted a job at the Victor Talking Machine Company (later RCA-Victor) in Camden, New Jersey, where he worked in their Acoustic Research Department.

Shortly thereafter was the Wall Street crash of 1929 and subsequent Great Depression, but Massa's research team received a reprieve from the sunken economy thanks to the growing motion picture industry's dire need for better sound equipment. Massa helped move the industry from its entirely mechanical sound recording and reproduction infancy to its golden age of high-quality electrical loud speakers and microphones—thereby rapidly advancing the field of electroacoustic engineering.

In the mid-1930s, the U.S. Navy began contracting with RCA-Victor for electroacoustic transducers that could meet stringent demands for ruggedness and reliability. A specialized government sound engineering laboratory was set up at RCA-Victor, with Massa in its lead. He invented new production techniques to develop the first on-ship speaker to successfully withstand gun-blast pressures, as well as a low-cost, blast-proof, lightweight sound-powered telephone for the Navy's fleet—permitting the direct transmission of speech without the use of batteries.

During the same time, Massa met and married Georgiana Galbraith, who was the personal secretary of Vladimir Zworykin, a pioneer of television technology. Massa and Georgiana went on to have five children together.

== Working with the U.S. Navy ==
In 1942, the Brush Development Company offered Massa the position of Director of Acoustical Research, and he relocated his family to Cleveland, Ohio, for the job.

At this time, the United States had just entered World War II and many battles were occurring at sea. German navy U-boat submarines were utilizing wolfpack tactics to stealthily take out Allied convoys—American ships carrying war material to England—and the massive attacks were significantly hindering the U.S. war effort. Overcoming this challenge was assigned the highest national priority and the National Defense Research Council embarked upon a full-scale effort to overcome it. One of Massa's former colleagues from RCA-Victor had recently been named the commanding officer of the Naval Gun Factory and he commissioned Massa to develop systems that could counter the devastating effects of the German U-boats.

Their first tactic was to protect individual, slow-moving ships from the U-boats' torpedo attacks. The plan was to tow streamers along the sides of U.S. ships with small charges of TNT explosives at fixed points. By developing a hydrophone that was placed at each TNT location, Massa created a device that could pick up noise from the approaching torpedo and automatically fire a counter charge before the torpedo reached the ship.

The towed array was a success, and the Navy contracted Massa's Brush engineering group to work full-time on the continued development of transducers—devices that convert energy from one form to another—for underwater military applications. He helped design and build the first successful scanning sonar, which helped U.S. ships detect the locations of German submarines. Throughout the war, Massa's team produced new acoustic transducers on an almost monthly basis for the Navy, with applications in mines, torpedoes and passive long-range submarine sonar systems—helping to secure victory in the second world war.

Indeed, in the 1950s, the Secretary of the Navy sent Massa a letter thanking him for his role in the Allied victory because of his development of sonar equipment for the Navy.

== Career ==
In 1945, with his wife Georgiana, Massa founded his own company: Massa Laboratories, Inc., headquartered in Cleveland, where he continued to advance the development of transducers. Some of his company's earliest products were high-precision microphones, accelerometers and underwater calibration devices. Massa grew a thriving business for five years before moving his operation to Hingham, Massachusetts, to settle into larger and more specialized facilities.

The company produced passive sonar equipment—enabling submarines to detect surface ships—as well as the equipment a 1985 expedition used to find the sunken RMS Titanic. Their devices were used for everything from air ultrasonic applications to whale tracking. Continuing his relationship with the Navy, Massa produced the world's largest sonar array in the 1960s, stringing together a 136,000 kg, megawatt sonar array that contained 1,440 separate transducers.

By the 1970s, the company split its work evenly between underwater applications (oceanography, military scanning sonars and anti-submarine warfare developments) and electro-acoustic systems, including ultrasonic transducers for in-air applications, intrusion alarms, motion detectors, remote-control proximity indicators, and even the first automatic scoring system for bowling.

Massa remained active as chairman of his company until his death in 1990. The Secretary of the Navy, H. Lawrence Garrett III, sent a letter of condolence to Massa's family, praising his contributions to the Navy.
