= List of ship launches in 1951 =

The list of ship launches in 1951 includes a chronological list of all ships launched in 1951.

Date	Ship	Class / type	Builder	Location	Country	Notes
9 January	Cuzco	Cargo ship	Blyth Dry Docks & Shipbuilding Co. Ltd	Blyth, Northumberland	United Kingdom	For Pacific Steam Navigation Co. Ltd.
12 January	Dalfonn	Tanker	Harland & Wolff	Belfast	United Kingdom	For Sigval Bergsen.
24 January	BO-339	Kronshtadt-class submarine chaser	Zelenodolsk Gorky Plant	Zelenedolsk	Soviet Union	
24 January	Audaz	Audaz-class destroyer	Sociedad Española de Construcción Naval	Ferrol	Spain	For Spanish Navy
27 January	Northampton	Unique command cruiser	Fore River Shipyard	Quincy, Massachusetts	United States	
8 February	Orkdal	Tanker	Harland & Wolff	Belfast	United Kingdom	For Moltzaua & Christensen.
16 February	BO-340	Kronshtadt-class submarine chaser	Zelenodolsk Gorky Plant	Zelenedolsk	Soviet Union	
2 March	K-1	Barracuda-class submarine	Electric Boat	Groton, Connecticut	United States	First in class
3 March	BO-341	Kronshtadt-class submarine chaser	Zelenodolsk Gorky Plant	Zelenedolsk	Soviet Union	
8 March	Norfolk Ferry	Train ferry	John Brown and Company	Clydebank, Scotland	United Kingdom	For British Transport Commission
12 March	Simba	Tug	Harland & Wolff	Belfast	United Kingdom	For East African Railways.
13 March	BO-342	Kronshtadt-class submarine chaser	Zelenodolsk Gorky Plant	Zelenedolsk	Soviet Union	
21 March	BO-343	Kronshtadt-class submarine chaser	Zelenodolsk Gorky Plant	Zelenedolsk	Soviet Union	
28 March	Aureol	Ocean Liner	Alexander Stephen and Sons	Glasgow, Scotland	United Kingdom	For Elder Dempster Lines
29 March	BO-344	Kronshtadt-class submarine chaser	Zelenodolsk Gorky Plant	Zelenedolsk	Soviet Union	
31 March	BO-345	Kronshtadt-class submarine chaser	Zelenodolsk Gorky Plant	Zelenedolsk	Soviet Union	
March	OBL Expeditor	Towboat	Alabama Drydock and Shipbuilding Company	Mobile, Alabama	United States	For Ohio Barge Line Inc.
March	P.O. 2001	Tank barge	Alabama Drydock and Shipbuilding Company	Mobile, Alabama	United States	For Pure Oil Company.
5 April	Rhodesia Castle	Passenger ship	Harland & Wolff	Belfast	United Kingdom	For Union-Castle Line.
6 April	BO-346	Kronshtadt-class submarine chaser	Zelenodolsk Gorky Plant	Zelenedolsk	Soviet Union	
9 April	Duchess	Daring-class destroyer	John I. Thornycroft & Company	Southampton, England	United Kingdom	
April	P.O. 2002	Tank barge	Alabama Drydock and Shipbuilding Company	Mobile, Alabama	United States	For Pure Oil Company.
2 May	K-2	Barracuda-class submarine	Mare Island Naval Shipyard	Vallejo, California	United States	
3 May	Setter 7	Whaler	Harland & Wolff	Belfast	United Kingdom	For United Whalers.
5 May	Bollsta	Tanker	Harland & Wolff	Belfast	United Kingdom	For Fred. Olsen & Co.
22 May	Tank King	Tanker	Harland & Wolff	Belfast	United Kingdom	For Sigurd Herlofsen A/S.
23 May	Nyati	Tug	Harland & Wolff	Belfast	United Kingdom	For East African Railways.
25 May	BO-347	Kronshtadt-class submarine chaser	Zelenodolsk Gorky Plant	Zelenedolsk	Soviet Union	
27 May	BO-348	Kronshtadt-class submarine chaser	Zelenodolsk Gorky Plant	Zelenedolsk	Soviet Union	
May	P.O. 2003	Tank barge	Alabama Drydock and Shipbuilding Company	Mobile, Alabama	United States	For Pure Oil Company.
May	P.O. 2004	Tank barge	Alabama Drydock and Shipbuilding Company	Mobile, Alabama	United States	For Pure Oil Company.
7 June	BO-349	Kronshtadt-class submarine chaser	Zelenodolsk Gorky Plant	Zelenedolsk	Soviet Union	
7 June	Setter 8	Whaler	Harland & Wolff	Belfast	United Kingdom	For United Whalers.
14 June	Trigger	Tang-class submarine	Electric Boat	Groton, Connecticut	United States	
16 June	Andrea Doria	Ocean liner	Ansaldo Shipyards	Genoa	Italy	For Italian Line
19 June	Port Nelson	Cargo ship	Harland & Wolff	Belfast	United Kingdom	For Port Line.
19 June	Tang	Tang-class submarine	Portsmouth Naval Shipyard	Kittery, Maine	United States	First in class
21 June	Kenya Castle	Ocean liner	Harland and Wolff	Belfast, Northern Ireland	United Kingdom	For Union-Castle Line
21 June	K-3	Barracuda-class submarine	Mare Island Naval Shipyard	Vallejo, California	United States	
23 June	United States	Ocean liner	Newport News Shipbuilding	Newport News, Virginia	United States	
23 June	BO-350	Kronshtadt-class submarine chaser	Zelenodolsk Gorky Plant	Zelenedolsk	Soviet Union	
2 July	France Stove	Tanker	Harland & Wolff	Belfast	United Kingdom	For Lorentzen A/S.
9 July	Star 9	Whaler	Harland & Wolff	Belfast	United Kingdom	For Hvalfinger A/S.
11 July	BO-351	Kronshtadt-class submarine chaser	Zelenodolsk Gorky Plant	Zelenedolsk	Soviet Union	
27 July	BO-353	Kronshtadt-class submarine chaser	Zelenodolsk Gorky Plant	Zelenedolsk	Soviet Union	
28 July	BO-352	Kronshtadt-class submarine chaser	Zelenodolsk Gorky Plant	Zelenedolsk	Soviet Union	
2 August	Eastern Star	Cargo ship	Harland & Wolff	Belfast	United Kingdom	For Australia China Line.
3 August	J. K. Hansen	Whaler	Harland & Wolff	Belfast	United Kingdom	For Union Whaling Co.
6 August	BO-354	Kronshtadt-class submarine chaser	Zelenodolsk Gorky Plant	Zelenedolsk	Soviet Union	
19 August	BO-356	Kronshtadt-class submarine chaser	Zelenodolsk Gorky Plant	Zelenedolsk	Soviet Union	
21 August	Trout	Tang-class submarine	Electric Boat	Groton, Connecticut	United States	
23 August	Anders Arvesen	Whaler	Harland & Wolff	Belfast	United Kingdom	For Union Whaling Co.
1 September	BO-357	Kronshtadt-class submarine chaser	Zelenodolsk Gorky Plant	Zelenedolsk	Soviet Union	
10 September	BO-358	Kronshtadt-class submarine chaser	Zelenodolsk Gorky Plant	Zelenedolsk	Soviet Union	
15 September	BO-359	Kronshtadt-class submarine chaser	Zelenodolsk Gorky Plant	Zelenedolsk	Soviet Union	
22 September	BO-360	Kronshtadt-class submarine chaser	Zelenodolsk Gorky Plant	Zelenedolsk	Soviet Union	
25 September	BO-361	Kronshtadt-class submarine chaser	Zelenodolsk Gorky Plant	Zelenedolsk	Soviet Union	
30 September	BO-362	Kronshtadt-class submarine chaser	Zelenodolsk Gorky Plant	Zelenedolsk	Soviet Union	
4 October	BO-363	Kronshtadt-class submarine chaser	Zelenodolsk Gorky Plant	Zelenedolsk	Soviet Union	
10 October	BO-364	Kronshtadt-class submarine chaser	Zelenodolsk Gorky Plant	Zelenedolsk	Soviet Union	
11 October	Iliade	Tanker	Harland & Wolff	Belfast	United Kingdom	For Societe Navale Delmas Vieljeux.
16 October	BO-365	Kronshtadt-class submarine chaser	Zelenodolsk Gorky Plant	Zelenedolsk	Soviet Union	
16 October	Wahoo	Tang-class submarine	Portsmouth Naval Shipyard	Kittery, Maine	United States	
11 November	BO-366	Kronshtadt-class submarine chaser	Zelenodolsk Gorky Plant	Zelenedolsk	Soviet Union	
29 November	Ebro	Cargo ship	Harland & Wolff	Belfast	United Kingdom	For Royal Mail Line.
29 November	King Malcolm	Cargo ship	Harland & Wolff	Belfast	United Kingdom	For King Line.
30 November	St. Laurent	St. Laurent-class destroyer	Canadian Vickers	Montreal, Quebec	Canada	First in class
3 December	Harder	Tang-class submarine	Electric Boat	Groton, Connecticut	United States	
17 December	BO-367	Kronshtadt-class submarine chaser	Zelenodolsk Gorky Plant	Zelenedolsk	Soviet Union	
17 December	BO-368	Kronshtadt-class submarine chaser	Zelenodolsk Gorky Plant	Zelenedolsk	Soviet Union	
17 December	Roonagh Head	Cargo ship	Harland & Wolff	Belfast	United Kingdom	For Ulster Steamship Co.
30 December	BO-369	Kronshtadt-class submarine chaser	Zelenodolsk Gorky Plant	Zelenedolsk	Soviet Union	
31 December	BO-370	Kronshtadt-class submarine chaser	Zelenodolsk Gorky Plant	Zelenedolsk	Soviet Union	
Unknown date	Bournemouth Belle	Motor vessel	J. Bolson & Son Ltd.	Poole	United Kingdom	For J. Bolson & Son Ltd.
Unknown date	Chastim	Tug	Bay Wharf Construction Co. Ltd.	Greenwich	United Kingdom	For Braithwaite & Dean
Unknown date	Saint Germain	Train ferry	Helsingør Skibs og Maskinbyggeri	Helsingør	Denmark	For SNCF
Unknown date	3 unnamed vessels	Tank barges	Alabama Drydock and Shipbuilding Company	Mobile, Alabama	United States	For The Texas Company.
Unknown date	Unnamed	Tank barge	Alabama Drydock and Shipbuilding Company	Mobile, Alabama	United States	For Belcher Towing Co. Prefixed "Barge No.", likely followed by a number.
