= USS Tang =

Three submarines of the United States Navy have been named USS Tang, after the tang, or surgeonfish, especially of the several West Indian species. May refer to:

- USS Tang (SS-306), a Balao-class submarine sunk by her own torpedo during World War II
- USS Tang (SS-563), the lead boat of her class, served through the first half of the Cold War
- USS Tang (SSN-805), a planned Virginia-class submarine
