= Italian submarine Romeo Romei =

Romeo Romei was the name of at least two ships of the Italian Navy named in honour of Romeo Romei, a World War II submarine commander, and may refer to:

- Italian submarine Romeo Romei (S 516), a Tang-class submarine launched in 1951 as USS Harder. In 1974 she was sold to Italy and renamed, she was decommissioned in 1988.
- Italian submarine Romeo Romei (S 529), a Todaro-class submarine launched in 2015.
