= USS Gudgeon =

Two ships of the United States Navy have borne the name USS Gudgeon, named in honor of the gudgeon.

- USS Gudgeon (SS-211) was a Tambor-class submarine, commissioned in 1941 and lost in 1944
- USS Gudgeon (SS-567) was a Tang-class submarine, commissioned in 1952, sold to Turkey and stricken from the Naval Vessel Register in 1987. As TCG Hizir Reis (S-342), the sub served in the Turkish Navy from 1983 to 2004
