= USS Tringa =

US Navy submarine rescue ship

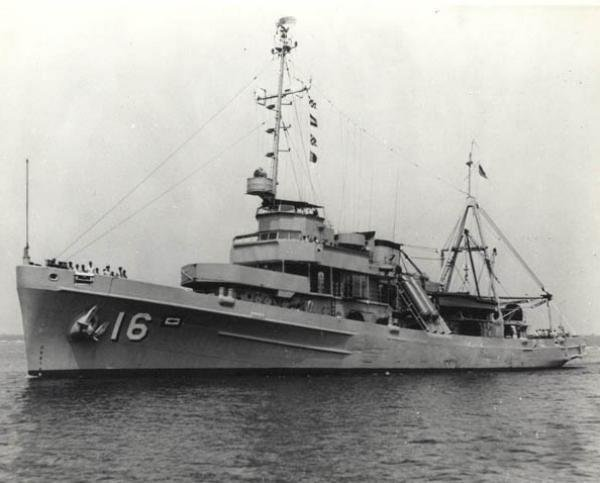

History

United States
- Name: USS Tringa
- Builder: Savannah Machine & Foundry Co.
- Laid down: 12 July 1945
- Launched: 25 June 1946
- Commissioned: 28 January 1947
- Decommissioned: 30 September 1977
- Stricken: 30 September 1977

General characteristics
- Class & type: Chanticleer-class submarine rescue ship
- Displacement: 1,780 long tons (1,809 t)
- Length: 251 ft 4 in (76.61 m)
- Beam: 42 ft (13 m)
- Draft: 14 ft 3 in (4.34 m)
- Speed: 16 knots (18 mph; 30 km/h)
- Complement: 102
- Armament: 2 × 3"/50 caliber guns

USS Tringa (ASR-16) was a Chanticleer-class submarine rescue ship of the United States Navy. She was laid down on 12 July 1945 at Savannah, Georgia, by the Savannah Machine & Foundry Co.; launched on 25 June 1946; sponsored by Mrs. Nola Dora Vassar, the mother of Curtis L. Vassar, Jr., missing in action; and commissioned on 28 January 1947.

== Service history ==
=== 1947–1960 ===
Upon commissioning, Tringa was assigned to Submarine Squadron (SubRon) 8 and operated out of the submarine base at New London, Connecticut. During her first six years of active service, she remained close to the eastern seaboard. Fortunately, her services as a submarine rescue vessel were not required. On the other hand, Tringa remained busy practicing simulated submarine rescues and serving as target ship and recovery ship for submarines in torpedo-firing drills. In addition, she participated in a number of rescue experiments for the Bureau of Ships, testing diving bells, submarine buoys, ground tackle, mooring gear, and related equipment.

Her most significant contribution during those six years came in January 1950 when Missouri (BB-63) ran aground in the vicinity of Thimble Shoals Light and Old Point Comfort, Hampton Roads, Virginia. Tringa and her sister rescue vessels joined tugs in refloating the battleship on 1 February.

In August 1953, Tringa was called upon to cross the Atlantic Ocean to aid Harder (SS-568), which had broken down off the coast of Ireland. The ship returned to New London with the submarine and then resumed operations along the east coast of the United States. During the early months of 1955, Tringa escorted USS Nautilus (SSN-571), the world's first atomic-powered ship, during her sea trials.

That fall, she joined USS Albacore (AGSS-569) for experiments at Portsmouth, New Hampshire. The submarine rescue vessel conducted deep submergence tests on a new submarine rescue chamber, RC-21. In the midst of that operation, RC-21 parted its tow and sank in 230 feet of water. Tringa spent the next 25 days struggling against foul weather, treacherous currents, and fouled wreckage, but successfully salvaged RC-21 in the end. For their part in the operation, three officers and 10 divers assigned to Tringa received commendations.

Early in 1957, she began serving as school ship for the submarine Prospective Commanding Officers' School. That duty took her to the warm waters of the British West Indies in April and again in July. After her return to normal duty at New London, Tringa was called upon to assist the newly constructed Peruvian submarine Iquiqui, which on 27 August had run aground on Long Sand Shoal in Long Island Sound. The rescuer arrived on the scene, passed a tow wire to the stranded boat, and pulled her off at the next high tide.

Late in the summer, a voyage to Europe broke Tringa's routine. On 3 September, she stood out of New London in company with Fulton (AS-11) and a submarine group to participate in a NATO fleet exercise. En route to Scotland, Tringa made a brief side trip to Newfoundland to deliver a critically ill Fulton crewman to the naval hospital at Argentia. She reached Rothesay on 13 September but soon moved on to Portland, England. During the two-day trip, hurricane "Carrie" struck and enlivened Tringa's passage through the Irish Sea. On 28 September, the ship departed England and headed for France. At Le Havre, she provided tender services for the submarines returning from the exercises until 11 October when she headed home toward the United States.

Tringa reentered Newport on 23 October and, after three weeks of upkeep, sailed for Bermuda and another tour of duty with the submarine Prospective Commanding Officers' School. In January 1958, she served as target ship for the submarine school at New London and recovered practice torpedoes fired at her. She underwent her biennial overhaul at Boston that spring and, after refresher training in June, made a two-week goodwill cruise to Canadian ports in July.

Tringa returned to New London on 22 July and, through the first month and a half of 1959, trained divers, served as target and torpedo recovery ship for New London-based submarines, and conducted drills. On 25 February, she got underway for Norfolk, Virginia, where she served as Kittiwake's (ASR-13) stand-in during that ship's overhaul. She operated as a temporary unit of SubRon 6 until 1 April at which time she departed Norfolk and moved north. After a brief rendezvous with Torsk (SS-423) during the latter's post-overhaul dives and a three-day stopover at Philadelphia, Tringa returned with the submarine to New London on the 9th.

After demonstrating her rescue capabilities during an operational readiness inspection, she resumed training divers, conducting underway training, and providing services to submarines. She also escorted submarines during their post-construction trials. In this regard, Tringa assisted Barbel (SS-580) in May and Seadragon (SSN-584) in October. In December, the ship escorted the fleet ballistic missile (FBM) submarine George Washington (SSBN-598) on her trials. In January 1960, she conducted diving operations in Narragansett Bay with a group of four Norfolk-based minesweepers in a search for debris from an exploded aircraft. Following the annual "Springboard" exercise in mid-February, Tringa visited Puerto Rico, the Virgin Islands, and the Dominican Republic before resuming duty out of New London late in March. Toward the end of the following month, the ship sailed to Ft. Lauderdale, Florida, where she spent a month as recovery ship for the Naval Ordnance Test Facility's missile program. In May, she returned north and, after a visit to Kingston, New York, and a brief rendezvous with Dogfish (SS-350) for that submarine's sea trials and deep dives, Tringa returned to New London to prepare for overhaul.

=== 1960–1970 ===
Following post-overhaul refresher training, Tringa resumed her normal duty out of New London. In December, she began assisting in the fleet ballistic missile submarine ordnance evaluation program by recovering test missiles fired in practice. The following spring, she returned to Norfolk to serve as "ready duty ASR" for most of the Atlantic coast during a period when the other Atlantic Fleet submarine rescue vessels were either in overhaul or deployed overseas. By July 1961, however, she was able to return to New London and resume her usual routine. In the fall, she steamed south to Florida but remained in southern waters only briefly — assisting the Bureau of Weapons in tests — before the requirements of the FBM program called her back to New London.

Over the next two years, the ship alternated two deployments to the Mediterranean with 2d Fleet operations along the eastern seaboard. After returning from submarine operations near Bermuda, Tringa operated from New London until early in April 1962. At that time, she put to sea for a three-month deployment during which she provided support services to 6th Fleet submarines. After visiting a number of Mediterranean ports, she left the "middle sea" in July 1962 and visited Lisbon, Portugal, and then headed for Scotland. At Holy Loch, Scotland she picked up an APL and a YRDM for tandem tow to the United States and departed the British Isles on 12 August. Tringa delivered her charges to Norfolk, Virginia on 3 September and continued on to New London where she arrived on the 5th. After four weeks of leave and upkeep, she resumed duty escorting and towing targets for units of Submarine Flotilla (Sub-Flot) 2.

Tringa underwent another overhaul from March to July 1963 and, after refresher training, resumed duty with Atlantic Fleet submarines. In August, she visited the site of Thresher's (SSN-593) sinking to support units operating with the deep submergence vehicle Trieste. In mid-September, she escorted Thomas Jefferson (SSBN—618) during trials. Later that month, she was called upon to assist Grouse (MSCO-15) aground on the Massachusetts coast at Cape Ann. Her divers attached cables to Grouse, but three attempts to pull the stranded ship off the rocks failed. Grouse was destroyed by fire, and Tringa returned to New London on 30 September. Normal operations and escort duty for two newly constructed FBM submarines — Nathan Hale (SSBN-623) and Lafayette (SSBN-616) — occupied the ship for the remainder of the year.

Tringa deployed to the Mediterranean for the second time on 3 April 1964 and returned to the United States on 1 September. After a three-week upkeep period, she resumed local operations by escorting Haddo (SSN-604) and Tecumseh (SSBN-628) during their sea trials. That employment occupied her to the end of 1964 and through 1965.

She cleared New London on 31 January 1966 to participate in Operation "Springboard." Three days out of port, the ship was ordered to the Mediterranean to join in the search for the nuclear weapon missing after the mid-air collision of a B-52 bomber with a KC-135 tanker aircraft. Upon her arrival off Palomares, Spain, Tringa was fitted out with underwater television equipment with which she conducted visual inspections of sonar contacts while her divers assisted in the recovery. The submarine rescue ship completed her part of the operation on 25 March and headed back to New London, where she arrived on 9 April. Local operations out of New London occupied her time until the end of September when she entered the James S. Munro Shipyard at Chelsea, Massachusetts, for overhaul.

Tringa completed overhaul in January 1967 and then returned to New London. She remained there until 30 January when she sailed for the West Indies. During February and the first week in March, the ship underwent inspection and survey at San Juan, conducted refresher training near Guantánamo Bay, and assisted in test-firings of SUBROC missiles at the Grand Turk missile range. On 15 March, Tringa reentered New London and began preparations for a deployment to European waters. The ship cleared New London on 3 April and reported for duty at Rota, Spain, later in the month. She operated along the Spanish and Portuguese coasts for two months, escorting submarines, towing targets, and recovering practice torpedoes. On 14 June, Tringa headed for the submarine base at Holy Loch. During the following month, she provided services to the submarines based there and visited Dublin and Derry. On 26 July, she returned to New London from her European deployment and took up duties with SubFlot 2 once again.

The submarine rescue vessel served in coastal waters of the United States for the remainder of 1967 and throughout 1968. During that period, she departed northeastern coastal waters only once, in mid-November 1968, when she made a short cruise to Bermuda with units of SubRon 8. On 6 January 1969 — in company with Sea Robin (SS-407), Becuna (AGSS-319), Halfbeak (SS-352), and Thornback (SS-418) — she departed New London and headed for duty with the 6th Fleet. She reached Rota, Spain, on 20 January and joined United States naval forces assigned to the Mediterranean area. The deployment with the 6th Fleet lasted until 15 April when she left Rota and headed back across the Atlantic. Tringa entered New London on the 25th and began post-deployment leave and upkeep. A little over two months later, the ship resumed operations from New London and remained so occupied until the end of November when she entered the Boston Naval Shipyard.

=== 1970–1977 ===
Tringa completed overhaul early in March 1970. During refresher training, she received orders reassigning her to Submarine Division 121 based at Key West, Florida. She reported to her new home port on 29 April; and, for the rest of the year, she operated in the Gulf of Mexico and along the southeastern coast of the United States. Early in June, the ship accompanied Darter (SS-576) during her sea trials. Later that month, she picked up a Cuban refugee family adrift on the ocean some 35 miles from Key West and brought them into that port. Through the fall of 1970, Tringa continued normal operations from Key West.

Over the next five years, Tringa alternated tours of duty in the Mediterranean with service along the east coast of the United States. Within that time period, she made two deployments with the 6th Fleet: the first during the spring of 1971 and the second in the summer of 1972. Upon her return to the United States on each occasion, she resumed her duties at Key West conducting torpedo exercises with Atlantic Fleet submarines.

In June 1973, Tringa rushed to the rescue when Johnson Sea Link accident disaster struck a civilian deep-submergence vehicle test project. On the 17th, she received orders to go to the aid of Dr. Edwin Link, whose submersible, the Johnson Sea Link, was reported "in distress, bottomed in approximately 360 feet of water with four men on board." Tringa made a four-point moor above the stricken craft and for two days provided a platform for divers engaged in the rescue operation. Finally, on 18 June, a civilian salvage vessel, A. B. Wood, arrived on the scene and joined in the salvage/rescue operation. Utilizing a television camera and a crane, A. B. Wood succeeded in hauling the Sea Link to the surface that night. Though Tringa divers tried to revive the two men in the after chamber of the submersible by warming it with HeO and hot water, the two men were pronounced dead at 0800 on 20 June. The two men in the forward chamber survived.

The following month, Tringa was reassigned to New London, and spent August and September engaged in the familiar role of standby rescue and target recovery ship for New London-based submarines. Following an overhaul which lasted from November 1973 until mid-February 1974, the ship returned to duty at New London. The next three years brought Tringa more routine duty supporting Atlantic Fleet submarines, testing diving equipment, training divers, and escorting newly built submarines on their trial cruises. The ship departed the western Atlantic only once during that period, in July 1975, to participate in a series of oceanographic surveys conducted from the submarine base at Holy Loch, Scotland. She returned to New London early the following November and operated along the eastern seaboard until 30 September 1977 when she was decommissioned at the Submarine Base, New London, Connecticut. Her name was struck from the Navy List concurrently with decommissioning.
