= USS Darter (SS-576) =

Submarine of the United States

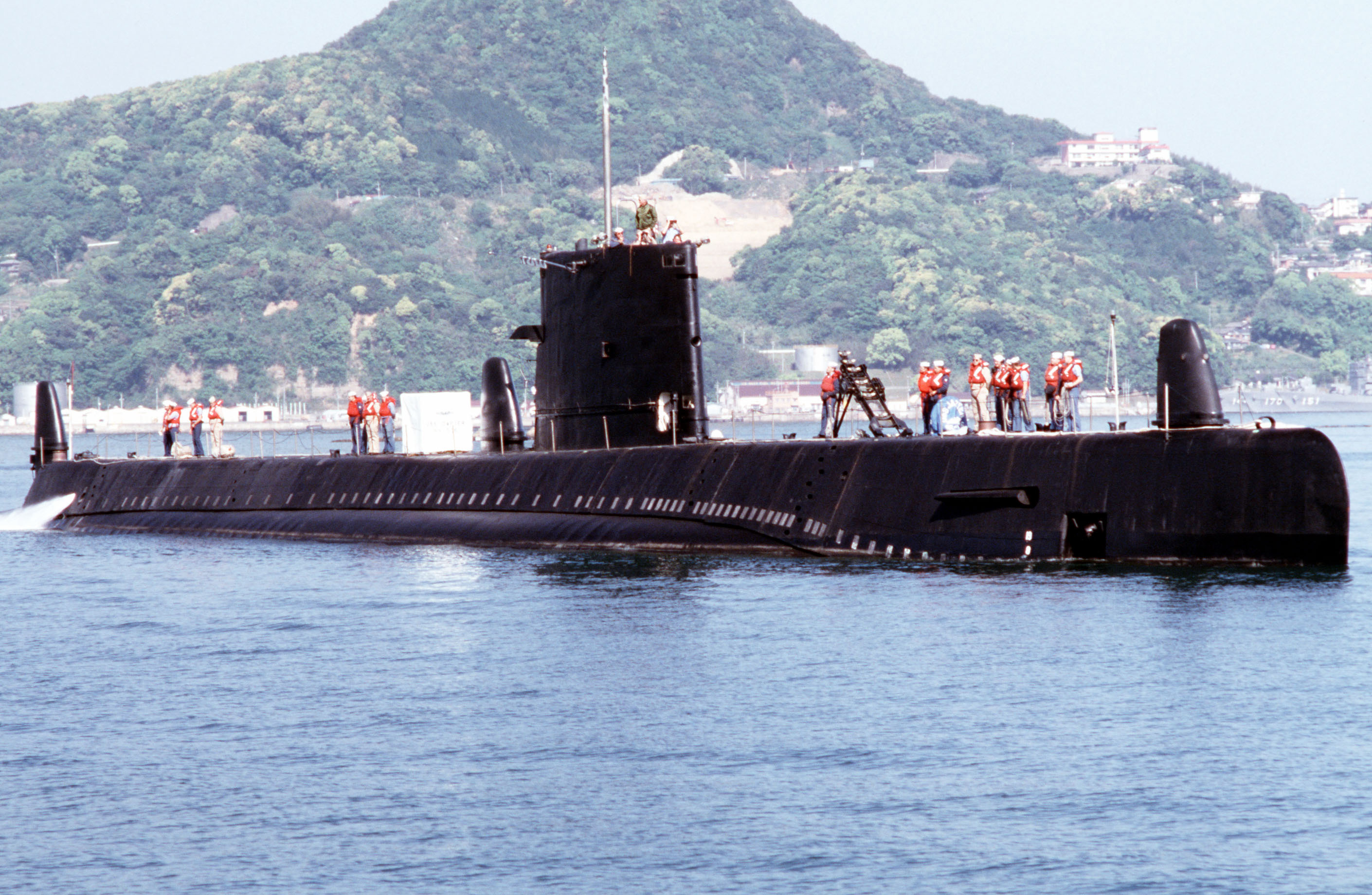
- USS Darter, with the forward torpedo cradle raised (the three distinctive shark-fin domes are the PUFFS sonar).

Class overview
- Builders: General Dynamics Electric Boat, Groton, Connecticut
- Operators: United States Navy
- Preceded by: Tang class; USS Seawolf (chronological only)
- Succeeded by: Barbel class
- Built: 1954
- In commission: 1956–1989

History

United States
- Name: USS Darter
- Awarded: 30 June 1954
- Builder: General Dynamics Electric Boat, Groton, Connecticut
- Laid down: 10 November 1954
- Launched: 28 May 1956
- Commissioned: 20 October 1956
- Decommissioned: 12 December 1989
- Stricken: 17 January 1990
- Fate: Sunk as a target, 7 January 1992

General characteristics
- Class & type: Submarine
- Displacement: 1,620 long tons (1,646 t) surfaced; 2,372 long tons (2,410 t) submerged
- Length: 285 ft 3 in (86.94 m) o/a
- Beam: 27 ft (8.2 m) overall; 25 ft (7.6 m) waterline
- Draft: 19 ft (5.8 m)
- Propulsion: Diesel-electric, two propellers
- Speed: 15.5 kn (17.8 mph; 28.7 km/h) surfaced; 16 kn (18 mph; 30 km/h) submerged
- Test depth: 700 ft (210 m)
- Complement: 8 officers, 75 men
- Armament: 8 × 21 inch (533 mm) torpedo tubes, (six forward, two aft)

USS Darter (SS-576), a unique submarine based on the Tang class, but incorporating many improvements, was the second ship of the United States Navy to be named for the darter, a type of small American fresh-water fish.

The contract to build Darter was awarded to the Electric Boat Division of General Dynamics Corporation in Groton, Connecticut on 30 June 1954 and her keel was laid down on 10 November 1954. She was launched on 28 May 1956 sponsored by Mrs. G.L. Russell, and commissioned on 20 October 1956.

Designed under project SCB 116 with sophisticated acoustic, electronic and fire control gear, Darter was intended to serve as a new generation of post-war ASW submarines, similar to USS Tang (SS-563). Darter was used to experiment with numerous innovations including a three-man helmsman-planesman station using aircraft-style stick controls.

== Service history ==
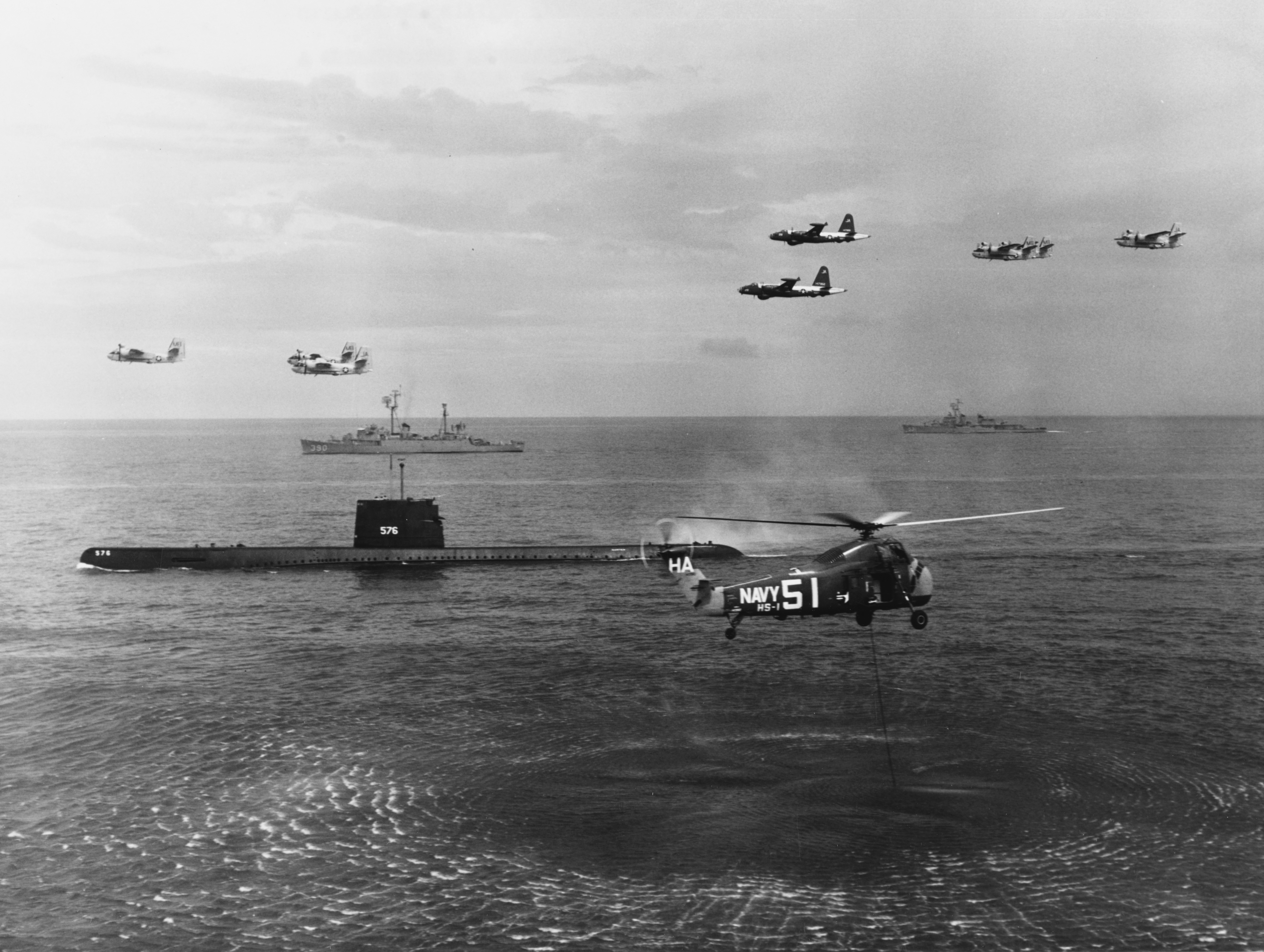
USS Darter (before hull extension and addition of PUFFS domes) during anti-submarine warfare demonstration during the Inter-American Naval Conference, June 1960

Upon commissioning Darter operated on various training exercises in the Atlantic, both locally from her homeport of Newport, Rhode Island, and on cruises to the West Indies, to Canada and Europe on NATO operations. Following an overhaul at Portsmouth Naval Shipyard she changed homeport to Charleston, South Carolina on 1 August 1959 and began training missions in support of the newly commissioned fleet ballistic missile submarines, providing anti-submarine warfare (ASW) services for surface units in the West Indies and off Key West, Florida, and serving as a platform for various Chief of Naval Operations (CNO) projects. In between these operations, Darter deployed to the Mediterranean for cruises in 1963 and 1967. She also received a major modernization overhaul at Charleston Naval Shipyard in 1965, receiving a 16-foot (5 m) hull extension (the "plug", just forward of the engine room), new engines, new safety gear (SUBSAFE), better electronic gear (including the AN/BQG-4 Passive Underwater Fire Control Feasibility System (PUFFS) passive sonar with three shark-fin domes added topside) and other upgrades.

Shifting homeports again in 1971, she moved to San Diego, California, Darter made four Western Pacific (WestPac) deployments in support of 7th Fleet operations. While on one of these in 1978, the head valve failed to close while snorkeling, and the ship had to emergency surface among U.S. surface units participating in an ASW exercise. On 8 May 1979, Darter changed homeport again to Sasebo, Japan, where she operated as a forward-deployed submarine. She spent a decade there: conducting numerous joint operations with the Japanese, South Korean, Thai, Malaysian, British and Australian navies; special operations; and other operations and exercises throughout the Western Pacific. Darter served as a submarine platform for U.S. Navy SEALS, USMC Recon Marines and the U.S. Army Special Forces. She won a Battle Efficiency Award (Battle "E") in 1980 and again in 1982.

In mid-1982 she underwent an overhaul at the U.S. Naval Base Subic Bay. In September 1985, Darter was submerged when the submarine collided with the merchant ship (tanker) Kansas Getty and its anchor chain near Pusan, Korea. Darter suffered some damage and was repaired at Sasebo, Japan. Nobody was injured in the accident and the tanker was undamaged.

Darter was decommissioned in Pearl Harbor on 1 December 1989 after serving over 33 years in the US Navy. Her career was one of the longest for a US Navy submarine, during which Darter earned seven Battle “E” Awards and numerous departmental excellence awards.

She was struck from the Naval Vessel Register on 17 January 1990. On 7 January 1992, ex-Darter was sunk as a target by USS Tautog (SSN-639) off Pearl Harbor, Hawaii.

== Call sign ==
International radio call sign of USS Darter (SS-576)
November	Delta	Lima	Mike
