= USS Devilfish =

Submarine of the United States

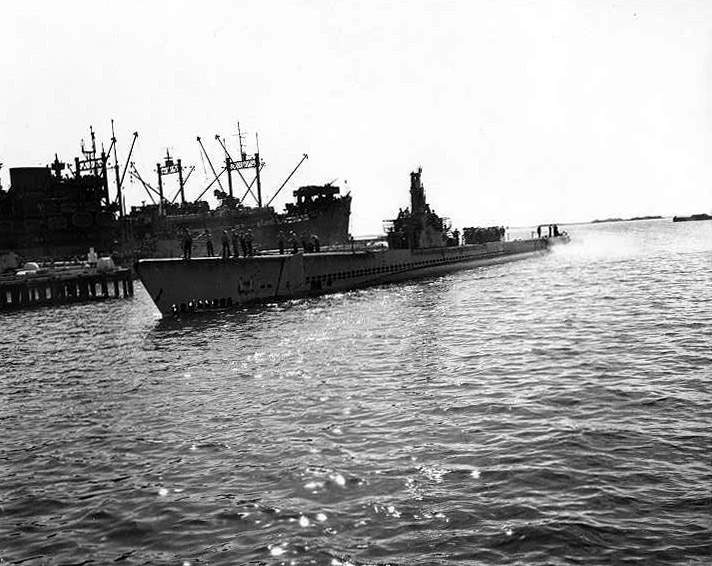
- Devilfish (SS-292) entering port, c. 1945

History

United States
- Name: Devilfish
- Builder: Cramp Shipbuilding Co., Philadelphia
- Yard number: 547
- Laid down: 31 March 1942
- Launched: 30 May 1943
- Commissioned: 1 September 1944
- Decommissioned: 30 September 1946
- Stricken: 1 March 1967
- Fate: Sunk as a target off San Francisco, California, on 14 August 1968

General characteristics
- Class & type: Balao class diesel-electric submarine
- Displacement: 1,526 long tons (1,550 t) surfaced, 2,424 tons (2,463 t) submerged
- Length: 311 ft 8 in (95.00 m)
- Beam: 27 ft 3 in (8.31 m)
- Draft: 16 ft 10 in (5.13 m) maximum
- Propulsion: 4 × Fairbanks-Morse Model 38D8-1/8 9-cylinder opposed-piston diesel engines driving electrical generators; 2 × 126-cell Sargo batteries; 4 × high-speed Elliott electric motors with reduction gears; 2 × propellers; 5,400 shp (4.0 MW) surfaced; 2,740 shp (2.04 MW) submerged
- Speed: 20.25 kn (37.50 km/h) surfaced, 8.75 kn (16.21 km/h) submerged
- Range: 11,000 nmi (20,000 km) @ 10 kn (19 km/h) surfaced
- Endurance: 48 hours @ 2 kn (3.7 km/h) submerged, 75 days on patrol
- Test depth: 400 ft (120 m)
- Complement: 10 officers, 70–71 enlisted
- Armament: 10 × 21-inch (533 mm) torpedo tubes; 6 forward, 4 aft; 24 torpedoes; 1 × 5-inch (127 mm) / 25 caliber deck gun; Bofors 40 mm and Oerlikon 20 mm cannon

USS Devilfish (SS/AGSS-292), a Balao-class submarine, was a ship of the United States Navy named for the devil fish.

== Construction and commissioning ==
Devilfish was launched on 30 May 1943 by Cramp Shipbuilding Company, Philadelphia, Pennsylvania, sponsored by Mrs. Frank W. Fenno Jr., and commissioned on 1 September 1944.

== Service history ==
Devilfish aided the training program of the Fleet Sonar School at Key West from 18 October-2 November 1944. She reached Pearl Harbor on 2 December. On the last day of the year, she sailed on her first war patrol, putting into Saipan to refuel from 12 to 15 January 1945.

Devilfish patrolled the dangerous waters of Kii Suido and Bungo Suido off the island of Shikoku, and served as lifeguard for Army pilots bombing Japan. She refitted at Guam from 13 February-15 March, called at Saipan, and sailed on 16 March for her second war patrol.

Assigned to the area between Sagami Wan and the northern Nanpō Islands, Devilfish was attacked by a kamikaze plane on 20 March before she entered her patrol area. The plane crashed into her as the submarine was submerging, destroying the mast structure and causing serious leakage. Devilfish returned to Saipan and Pearl Harbor for repairs, departing Pearl Harbor on 20 May on her third patrol.

She sought targets in Bungo Suido and off northern Honshū, and on 16 June in heavy seas, attacked an enemy submarine carrying a midget submarine on her deck. On 26 June, she attacked an escort ship, but in both cases, the targets escaped. During this patrol, she acted as a lifeguard for strikes accompanying the Okinawa operation, and several times met with other submarines to take off medical cases and previously rescued aviators.

Devilfish called at to Guam to refit from 7 July-2 August, then sailed to the Nanpō Islands for her fourth war patrol, during which her primary mission was lifeguard duty for the 3rd Fleet raids on Japan. On 10 August, she bombarded Tori Shima, and on 16 August, after the end of hostilities, departed for Midway and San Francisco.

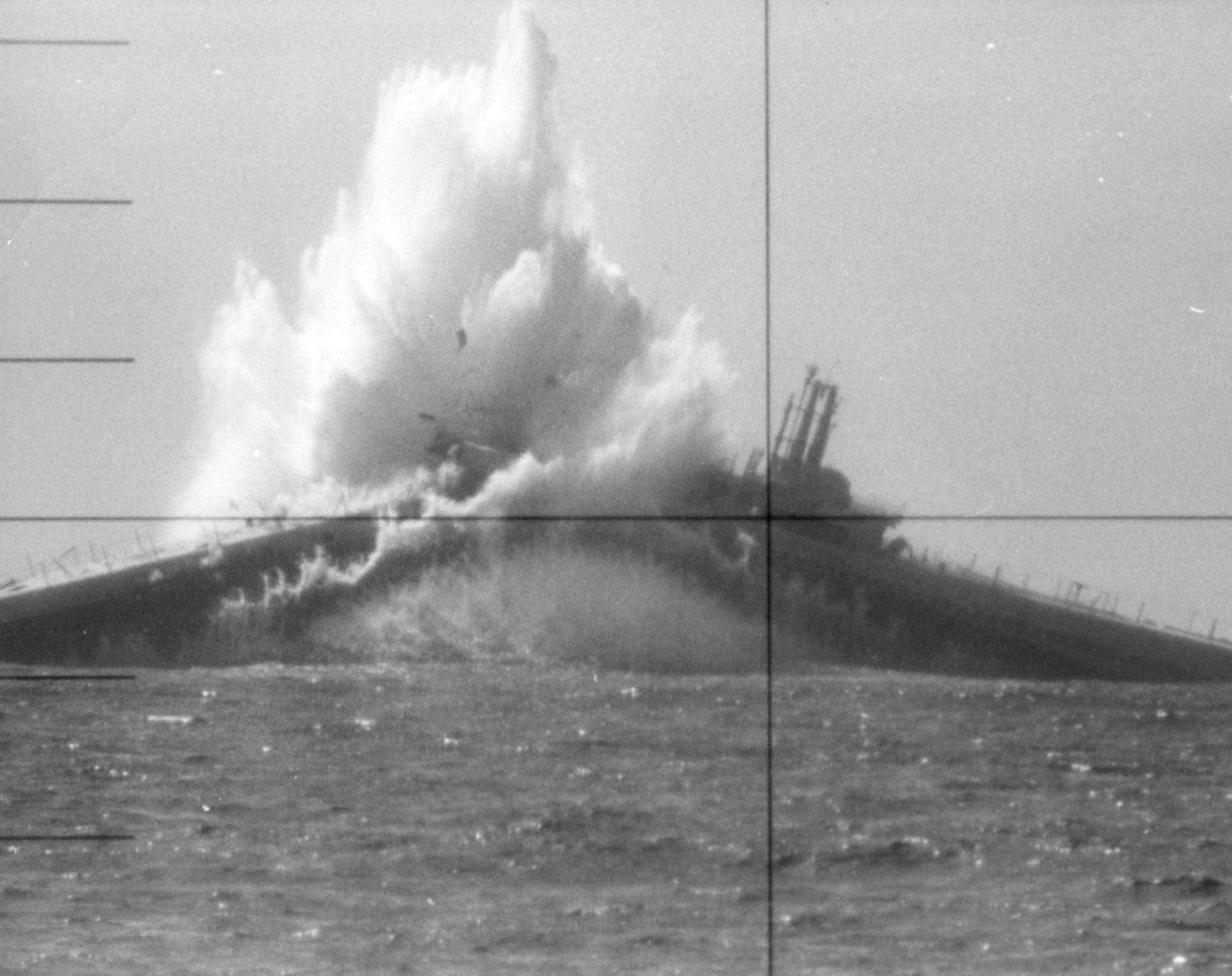
Devilfish was sunk as a target by Wahoo, 1968.

There, she was placed in commission in reserve on 18 April 1946, and out of commission in reserve on 30 September 1946. Laid up in the Pacific Reserve Fleet, Devilfish was redesignated AGSS-292. She was struck from the Naval Vessel Register on 1 March 1967.

Devilfish was sunk by the submarine USS Wahoo (SS-565) off San Francisco, California, on 14 August 1968, as part of a MK 16 MOD 8 torpedo test at 37°5′N 124°8′W in 2,000 fathoms (12,000 ft; 3,700 m) of water.

== Awards ==
Devilfish received three battle stars for her World War II service; her second war patrol was designated as "successful".
