= Eugene Parks Wilkinson =

US Navy officer

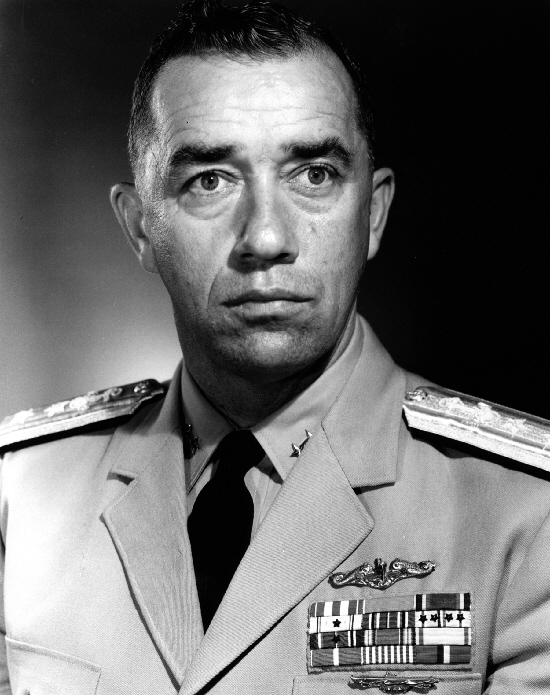
- Vice Admiral Eugene Parks Wilkinson
- Born: August 10, 1918; Long Beach, California, U.S.
- Died: July 11, 2013 (aged 94); Del Mar, California, U.S.
- Relatives: Wife, Janice; Daughter, Marian Lynn; Sons, Dennis, Stephen, and Rodney
- Military career
- Allegiance: United States of America
- Branch: United States Navy
- Service years: 1940–1974
- Rank: Vice Admiral
- Nickname: Dennis
- Commands: USS Volador; USS Sea Robin; USS Wahoo; USS Nautilus; USS Long Beach; Submarine Force U.S. Atlantic Fleet
- Conflicts: World War II; Korean War
- Awards: Distinguished Service Medal; Silver Star; Legion of Merit; Joint Service Commendation Medal; Navy Unit Commendation; Order of the Sacred Treasure, 2nd Class (Japan); Navy Meritorious Civilian Service Award; Golden Fleece Award; Henry DeWolf Smyth Nuclear Statesman Award
- Other work: Institute of Nuclear Power Operations

Eugene Parks "Dennis" Wilkinson (August 10, 1918 – July 11, 2013) was a United States Navy officer. He was selected for three historic command assignments. The first, in 1954, was as the first commanding officer of USS Nautilus, the world's first nuclear-powered submarine. The second was as the first commanding officer of USS Long Beach, America's first nuclear surface ship. The third was in 1980 when he was chosen as the first President and CEO of the Institute of Nuclear Power Operations (INPO) from which he retired in 1984.

== Biography and military career ==
=== Early life ===
Wilkinson, born in August 1918 in Long Beach, California, the son of Dennis William and Daisy Parks Wilkinson. He attended Holtville, California, High School and San Diego State College. He graduated from the latter in 1938 with a Bachelor of Arts degree with a major in chemistry. He taught chemistry there for a year. He also filled in and taught a course in mathematics. During this year he attended the University of Southern California. The next year he had a teaching fellowship in chemistry at USC. During those two years he completed all of the course work for a doctorate, but never did a thesis or received any graduate degree. Commissioned as an ensign in the U.S. Naval Reserve on 12 December 1940, he was transferred to the regular U.S. Navy on 28 August 1946.

=== Early career ===
Wilkinson's commissioned service began in the heavy cruiser USS Louisville, in which he had duty in the engineering department until December 1941.

=== World War II ===
Wilkinson was detached in San Francisco, with orders to the Submarine School, New London, Connecticut, for instruction in submarines. After completing the course in March 1942, he served in the engineering department of the submarine USS R-10 in April and May, after which he was ordered to the submarine USS Blackfish. After the commissioning of that boat in July, he served on board for one year, making four war patrols. He had commissary, engineering, and electrical duties. During his time in the crew the submarine participated in the North African operation (Algeria-Morocco landings).

From June 1943 to October 1944 Wilkinson was in the crew of the submarine USS Darter which participated in four war patrols, including the Truk attack and the Battle of Leyte Gulf. Wilkinson was awarded the Silver Star for his service aboard Darter. Officially detached from Darter in November 1944, following her loss the previous month, he returned to the United States. From January to March 1945 he was an instructor at the Submarine School, New London, Connecticut. He next served as executive officer and navigator of the submarine USS Menhaden from March to October 1945 and had similar duty on board the submarine USS Raton.

=== Post World War II ===
Upon his transfer from the Naval Reserve to the U.S. Navy, he was ordered to the General Line School, Newport, Rhode Island, where he completed the assigned course in May 1947. From June 1947 until April 1948, Wilkinson was executive officer and navigator of USS Cusk.

Joining then-Captain Hyman G. Rickover at Oak Ridge National Laboratory after passing one of the first of Rickover's many such interviews, Wilkinson "ultimately developed the nuclear physics equations and formulas for the team...and for the final reactor design" of the prototype reactor for USS Nautilus.

From April 1948 to April 1950, he completed assignments at the Oak Ridge; the Argonne National Laboratory in Chicago as an associate engineer, and at the U.S. Atomic Energy Commission in the Pittsburgh, Pennsylvania, area, as chief of the operations branch and Bureau of Ships representative. In May 1950 he assumed command of the submarine USS Volador in which he participated in action in the Korean area from 12 August to 2 November 1951. In February 1952 Wilkinson had temporary duty for one month as commanding officer of the submarine USS Sea Robin due to an injury to the assigned CO. From January to May 1952 he fitted out the submarine USS Wahoo and on her commissioning on 10 May of that year became her first commanding officer. He was detached from Wahoo in June 1953.

=== USS Nautilus ===
Wilkinson then carried out a series of temporary assignments by way of preparation for becoming prospective commanding officer of USS Nautilus, the world's first nuclear-powered submarine. He took command of the ship upon her commissioning on 30 September 1954 and held that billet until relieved in June 1957. During his three-year tour aboard Nautilus, he presided over pre-commissioning and post-commissioning trials of the submarine. These trials established the capabilities of the nuclear-powered submarine and were used in the development of early nuclear-powered submarine tactics. Nautilus successfully attacked surface ships without being detected and evaded most pursuers.

At 1100 on January 17, 1955, after getting underway, Commander Wilkinson signaled "Underway on Nuclear Power." This historic message ushered in the nuclear age for the United States Navy, as well as the world. Wilkinson was the first commanding officer in a nuclear fleet that would eventually cover most of the aircraft carriers, several cruisers, and the entire submarine fleet for the United States Navy.

=== Later career and Admiralty ===
After spending the following academic year as a student at the Naval War College, Newport, Rhode Island, Wilkinson served as Commander Submarine Division 102, a subunit of Submarine Squadron 10 at New London, Connecticut, for a year and had brief temporary duty as commanding officer of Nautilus.

In September 1959 he became the initial commanding officer of the guided missile cruiser USS Long Beach, the U.S. Navy's first nuclear-powered surface ship. After completion of that command and selection for promotion to rear admiral, he reported on 1 November 1963 as Director of the Submarine Warfare Division (OP-31), in the Office of the Chief of Naval Operations, Navy Department, Washington, D.C. Upon assignment to that billet he was promoted to the rank of rear admiral, six years below zone and the first non–Naval Academy graduate selected admiral after World War II. While in this role, he oversaw the development of the Navy's SubSafe program in response to the loss of USS Thresher in April 1963. He also initiated the Nuclear Propulsion Examining Board (NPEB) in the Atlantic and Pacific fleet, in which operational Navy line officers took over nuclear submarine inspection responsibilities from civilians at Naval Reactors, as well as the associated Operational Reactor Safeguards Examination (ORSE).

On 23 November 1966, he assumed duties as Chief of Staff for the U.S. Forces in Japan. After earning the Distinguished Service Medal for his service in Japan, Admiral Wilkinson assumed command of Submarine Flotilla 2 on 6 June 1969. He was promoted to vice admiral upon becoming Commander of the Atlantic Fleet Submarine Force on 12 February 1970. He had additional duty as Submarine Operations Advisor for Polaris Operations, Atlantic Command and Supreme Allied Command Atlantic, Commander Submarines Allied Command, and Commander Submarine Force Western Atlantic. His final billet on active duty, from 1972 to 1974, was as Deputy Chief of Naval Operations (Submarine Warfare), OP-02, on the staff of the Chief of Naval Operations.

He retired with the rank of Vice Admiral, having commanded the Submarine Force U.S. Atlantic Fleet (COMSUBLANT) from 1970 to 1972 as its first nuclear-trained officer, and served as Deputy Chief of Naval Operations for Submarine Warfare from 1972 until his retirement in 1974.

He died on July 11, 2013. A biography on his life was published in 2017 by the American Nuclear Society.

== Honors and awards ==
During his noteworthy naval career, Admiral Wilkinson earned:

- Navy Distinguished Service Medal with two gold stars (3 awards - 1969, 1972, 1974)
- Silver Star (1944)
- Legion of Merit (1953)
- Joint Service Commendation Medal (1964)
- Navy Unit Commendation (1944)
- American Defense Service Medal with "FLEET" clasp
- American Campaign Medal
- Asiatic-Pacific Campaign Medal with four battle stars
- European-African-Middle Eastern Campaign Medal with one battle star
- World War II Victory Medal
- China Service Medal
- National Defense Service Medal with star
- Korean Service Medal
- United Nations Korea Medal
- Philippine Liberation Medal
- Order of the Sacred Treasure, Second Class (Japan) (1969)
- 1955 Golden Fleece Award (National Association of Wool Manufacturers)
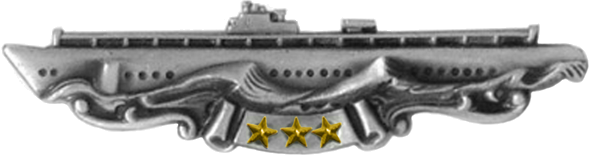
- Submarine Combat Patrol insignia with three bronze service star

After retiring from the Navy Admiral Wilkinson received the following awards:

- 1976 Navy Meritorious Civilian Service Award
- 1983 George Washington Gold Medal ASME
- 1984 Oliver Townsend Medal
- 1989 Uranium Institute Gold Medal
- 1990 Elected National Academy of Engineering
- 1994 Henry DeWolf Smyth Nuclear Statesman Award
- 1998 Walter H. Zinn Award from the American Nuclear Society.

== See also ==
Remarks by VADM Eugene P. "Dennis" Wilkinson, USN (ret.) First Commanding Officer of USS NAUTILUS (SSN 571) 50th Anniversary of NAUTILUS' First Underway on Nuclear Power Submarine Force Museum Monday, January 17, 2005
Wilkinson, Eugene P., Stillwell, Paul, (interviewer). The Reminiscences of Vice Admiral Eugen P. Wilkinson U.S. Navy (Retired). Annapolis: U.S. Naval Institute, 2006. OCLC OCLC 73501313
Stillwell, Paul, ed. Submarine Stories: Recollections from the Diesel Boats. 2007.
