= USS Gudgeon (SS-567) =

Submarine of the United States

Coordinates: 40°45′36″N 29°55′00″E

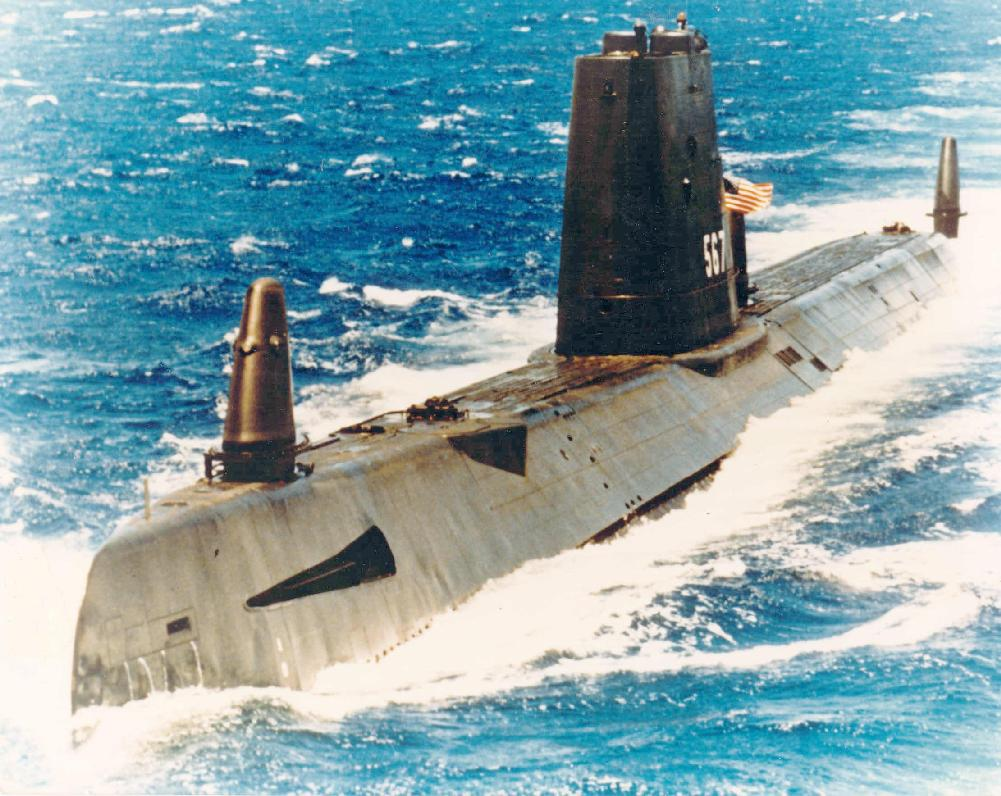
- USS Gudgeon underway, c. 1970s (the three distinctive shark-fin-like domes are the PUFFS sonar, one just aft of the sail, below the flag).

History

United States
- Name: USS Gudgeon
- Builder: Portsmouth Naval Shipyard
- Laid down: 20 May 1950
- Launched: 11 June 1952
- Commissioned: 21 November 1952
- Decommissioned: 30 September 1983
- Stricken: 6 August 1987
- Fate: Leased to Turkey, 1983; Sold to Turkey, 1987

Turkey
- Name: TCG Hızırreis
- Commissioned: 30 September 1983
- Decommissioned: 4 February 2004
- Identification: S342
- Fate: Museum of Naval History at Beşiktaş

General characteristics
- Class & type: Tang-class submarine Attack submarine
- Displacement: 1,560 long tons (1,585 t)
- Length: 269 ft 2 in (82.04 m)
- Beam: 27 ft 2 in (8.28 m)
- Draft: 17 ft (5.2 m)
- Speed: 15.5 knots (17.8 mph; 28.7 km/h)
- Test depth: 250 m (820 ft)
- Complement: 83 officers and men
- Armament: 8 × 21 inch (533 mm) torpedo tubes (6 forward, 2 aft)

USS Gudgeon (SS/AGSS/SSAG-567), a Tang-class submarine, was the second ship of the United States Navy to be named for the gudgeon, a species of small fresh-water minnow.

== Construction and commissioning ==
The submarine's keel was laid by the Portsmouth Naval Shipyard in Kittery, Maine. It was launched on 11 June 1952 sponsored by Mrs. Robert A. Bonin, widow of the first Gudgeon's last commanding officer, and commissioned on 21 November 1952 with Commander Robert M. Carroll in command. Gudgeon was the first American submarine to circumnavigate the globe; the navigator aboard this history making voyage was Lt. Leon Leroy Stine Jr., who died on January 30, 2018.

== Service record ==
After builders' trials, Gudgeon sailed for Pearl Harbor, where it joined Submarine Squadron 1 (SubRon 1), Submarine Division 1 (SubDiv 1), 18 July 1953. Local operations and training exercises continued until 11 April 1954, when Gudgeon sailed to the mainland for antisubmarine warfare (ASW) exercises along the Washington coast. A Mare Island Naval Shipyard overhaul occupied the remainder of the year, and Gudgeon returned to Pearl Harbor 9 March 1955. She sailed 21 Jul 1955, for the first of five WestPac tours, visiting Yokosuka, Formosa, Hong Kong, Manila, and Guam before returning to Pearl Harbor on 30 January 1956. Local operations out of the Hawaiian port, overhaul, special secret operations, and a second voyage to the West Coast took Gudgeon through the next 18 months.

Sailing from Pearl Harbor on 8 July 1957, Gudgeon began a history-making cruise around the world, making the Pacific Fleet Submarine Force's flagship the first American submarine to circumnavigate the globe. After exercises at Yokosuka, Gudgeon sailed west 26 August 1957. As it made her way around the world for the next six months, the submarine docked at Asian, African and European ports before a triumphal entry into Pearl Harbor 21 February 1958, eight months and 25,000 miles (40,000 km) since taking departure.

During August 1957, after being detected by the Soviet Navy outside the port of Vladivostok, outside the 3-mile territorial waters limit recognized by the US but well inside the 12-mile limit claimed by the Soviets, the Gudgeon was the first US submarine forced to the surface during the Cold War.

== First conversion ==
After extensive overhaul, Gudgeon again settled into the peacetime local and special operations, training exercises, and ASW activities. Three WestPac cruises, in 1959, 1961, and 1963, took it to Japan for exercises with the Seventh Fleet as well as to the US naval base at Subic Bay in the Philippine Islands and Hong Kong for liberty. During the alternate years, 1960 and 1962, Gudgeon was reassigned to mainland waters, training and exercising along the Washington and California coasts.

== Second conversion ==
Gudgeon returned from the Far East to Pearl Harbor 1 August 1963, and for the next two years operated in Hawaiian waters. It departed Pearl Harbor 29 November and arrived San Francisco, California, on 9 December for overhaul at Mare Island. The ship was cut in half and an 18-foot (5 meter) section was added during a conversion which gave the submarine new and larger engines as well as the Passive Underwater Fire Control Feasibility System (PUFFS) passive sonar installation. Modernization was completed during April 1967 and Gudgeon returned to duty in the Pacific Fleet.

[1967-1983]

Gudgeon was reclassified a miscellaneous auxiliary submarine, AGSS-567 and later SSAG-567 during November 1979.

Gudgeon served in the Pacific until it was decommissioned on 30 September 1983 and eliminated from the Naval Vessel Register on 6 August 1987.

== Awards ==
- China Service Medal
- National Defense Service Medal with star (2 awards)
- Armed Forces Expeditionary Medal
- Vietnam Service Medal with two campaign stars for Vietnam War service

== TCG Hızırreis (S 342) ==
During 1983, Gudgeon was transferred by lease to Turkey and renamed TCG Hızırreis (S 342), named for Ottoman Admiral Kurtoğlu Hızır Reis. It was purchased in 1987, served until 2004, and is presently berthed as a museum ship at the Kocaeli Museum Ships Command in Izmit and is open to the public.
