= USS Trigger (SS-564) =

Submarine of the United States

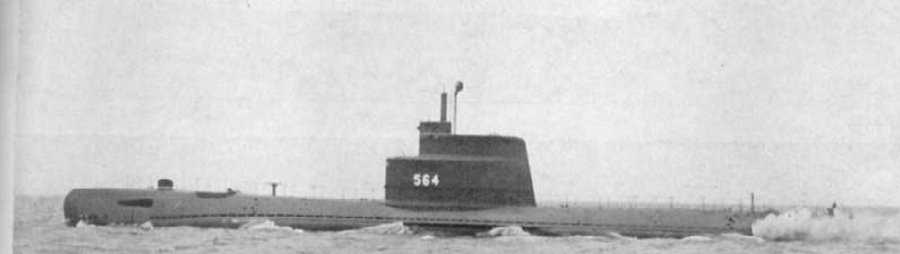
- USS Trigger (SS-564)

History

United States
- Name: USS Trigger
- Builder: Electric Boat Company
- Laid down: 24 February 1949
- Launched: 14 June 1951
- Commissioned: 31 March 1952
- Decommissioned: 2 July 1973
- Stricken: 2 July 1973
- Identification: SS-564
- Fate: Transferred to Italy 10 July 1973

Italy
- Name: Livio Piomarta
- Commissioned: 1973
- Decommissioned: 28 February 1986
- Identification: S 515

General characteristics
- Class & type: Tang-class submarine Attack submarine
- Displacement: 1,615 long tons (1,641 t) surfaced; 1,990 long tons (2,022 t) submerged
- Length: 269 ft (82 m)
- Beam: 27 ft (8.2 m)
- Draft: 17 ft (5.2 m)
- Speed: 18.3 knots (21.1 mph; 33.9 km/h) surfaced; 15.5 knots (17.8 mph; 28.7 km/h) submerged
- Complement: 88 officers and men
- Armament: 8 × 21 inch (533 mm) torpedo tubes (6 forward, 2 aft)

USS Trigger (SS-564), a Tang-class submarine, was the second ship of the United States Navy to be named for the triggerfish.

Her keel was laid down on 24 February 1949 at Groton, Connecticut, by the Electric Boat Company. She was launched on 14 June 1951 sponsored by Mrs. Roy S. Benson, and commissioned on 31 March 1952.

== History ==
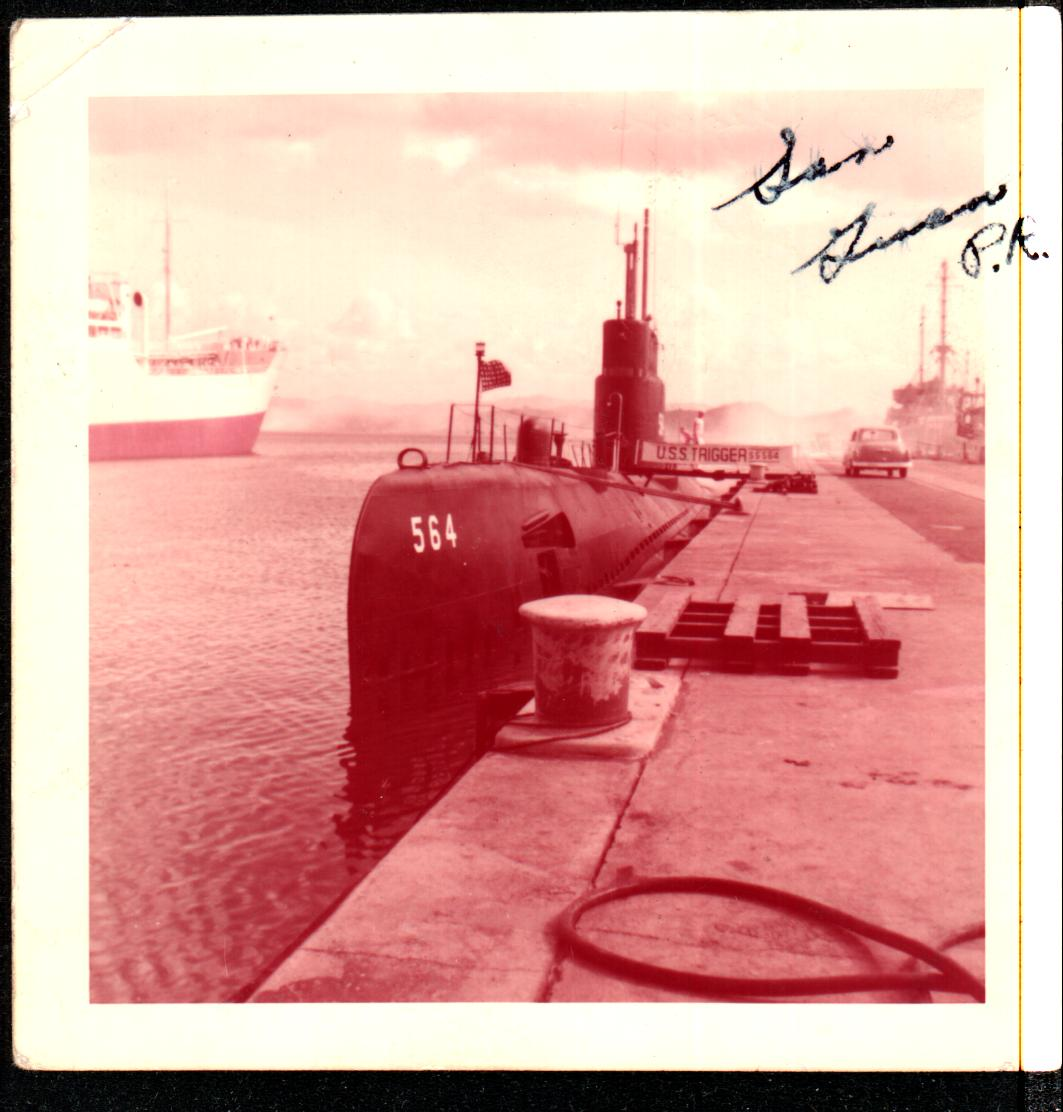
USS Trigger - San Juan, Puerto Rico

Following shakedown training off Rio de Janeiro, Brazil, the attack submarine returned to her home port, New London, Connecticut, and participated in local operations for the remainder of the year. She was back in the Caribbean Sea in February, returned to New London on 28 March, and continued East Coast operations until 16 August 1957. She then joined submarine Nautilus and proceeded to the Arctic Ocean. The submarine spent ten days at the ice pack in the north Greenland Sea and made several short trips under the ice pack. From 16 September to 1 October, she participated in the North Atlantic Treaty Organization (NATO) Operation "Strikeback". She then called at Portland, England and Le Havre, France, en route back to New London to resume normal operations.

On 14 January 1958, Trigger entered the Portsmouth Naval Shipyard in Kittery, Maine for major alterations. Her four troublesome high-speed diesel engines were replaced by three reliable medium-speed engines. The submarine was cut in two and lengthened by nine feet to accommodate the large, easier-to-maintain engines. On 15 August, she got underway for New London and refresher training. She stood out of New London on 2 February 1959 for extended operations in the North Atlantic. She called at Faslane, Scotland, and returned to her home port in late April.

On 1 August, Trigger joined SubRon4 at Charleston, S.C. her new home port and, in late September and early October, participated in NATO Exercise "Fishplay". The submarine conducted operations out of Charleston for the next decade. In 1964 she was overhauled in the Charleston shipyard with an emergency blow of straight 3000 psi air bypassing reducing valves. During the shakedown cruise to test the emergency blow from 150 feet her sail forced the boat to list almost 90 degrees to port and swung back to almost 90 degrees to a starboard list. No damage to the safety of the crew was encountered.

She was deployed to the Sixth Fleet in the Mediterranean during the periods: 10 April to 6 August 1962; 7 July to 29 October 1966; and 7 October 1969 to 2 February 1970. From 6 January to 6 August 1964, she underwent modifications in connection with the SUBSAFE program; and, from 3 January 1968 to 6 June 1969, her hull was again lengthened to accommodate the PUFFS sonar equipment.

On 10 August 1970, Trigger departed Charleston for the west coast and assignment to the Pacific Fleet. She called at Montego Bay, Rodman, and Acapulco en route, and arrived at San Diego, California, her new home port, on 6 September to join SubRon 3. On 18 November, the submarine got underway for Bangor, Washington, to spend a month testing the Mark 48 torpedo. From 3 March to 7 June 1971, Trigger returned to Bangor to participate in Mk 48 Torpedo Selection Test Plan operations. Following yard work at the Hunter's Point Naval Shipyard from July 1971 to April 1972, she made a voyage to the Nanoose Bay Acoustic Test Range and returned to San Diego on 25 May.

On 17 October, Trigger stood out to sea on her first WestPac deployment. She called at Christmas Island on 31 October and arrived at Auckland, New Zealand, on 10 November. The operational control of Trigger was shifted to the Commander, Seventh Fleet; and she participated in Exercise "Longex 7," a combined fleet problem utilizing ships from the navies of the United States, New Zealand, Canada, and Australia. The submarine departed Auckland on 1 December and arrived at Subic Bay on 18 December. From 29 December 1972 until 25 January 1973, Trigger was underway conducting special submarine operations. She left the Philippines on 3 February and, after calling at Hong Kong, participated in a joint United States-Canadian exercise off Taiwan. The ship sailed for Yokosuka on 20 February and remained in Japan undergoing repairs until getting underway for the United States on 16 March.

The submarine arrived at San Diego, California, on 5 April. On 25 June, she started training a crew of the Marina Militare to operate the ship. Trigger was decommissioned and transferred to Italy on 10 July 1973. She was struck from the Naval Vessel Register on 2 July 1973.

== Livio Piomarta (S 515) ==
Ex-Trigger served as Livio Piomarta until she was decommissioned on 28 February 1986.
