= USS Trout (SS-566) =

Submarine of the United States

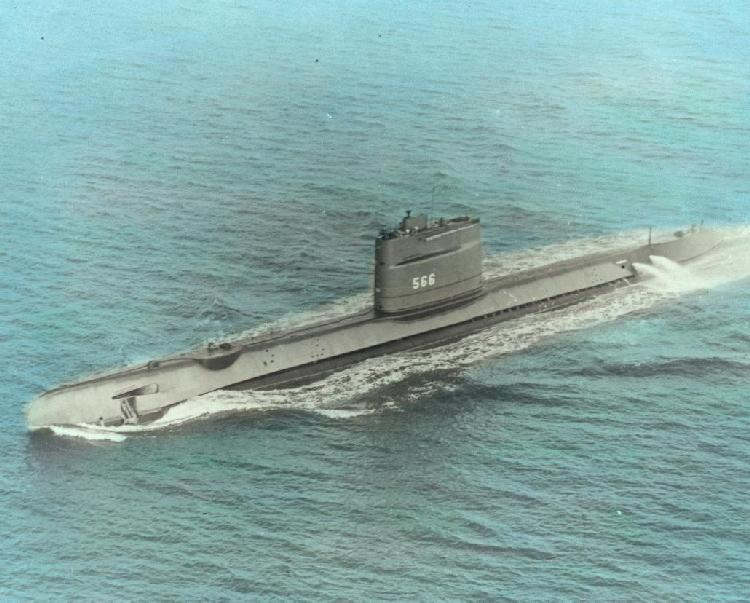
- USS Trout, ca. 1969.

History

United States
- Name: USS Trout
- Namesake: Trout, a number of species of freshwater and saltwater fish belonging to the subfamily Salmoninae of the family Salmonidae
- Awarded: 14 May 1948
- Builder: Electric Boat Division, General Dynamics Corporation, Groton, Connecticut
- Laid down: 1 December 1949
- Launched: 21 August 1951
- Sponsored by: Mrs. Albert H. Clark
- Commissioned: 27 June 1952
- Decommissioned: 2 January 1977
- Stricken: 19 December 1978
- Honors and awards: Battle Efficiency Award (Battle "E") 1961
- Fate: Transferred to Imperial Iranian Navy 19 December 1978

Imperial Iranian Navy
- Name: IIS Kousseh (SS 101)
- Namesake: Shark
- Acquired: 19 December 1978
- Fate: Abandoned in United States March 1979; Returned to U.S. custody 1992; Scrapping contract awarded May 2008; Scrapping completed 27 February 2009

General characteristics
- Class & type: Tang-class submarine Attack submarine
- Displacement: 1,615 long tons (1,641 t) light; 2,108 long tons (2,142 t) surfaced; 2,700 long tons (2,743 t) submerged
- Length: 269 ft (82 m)
- Beam: 27 ft 3 in (8.31 m)
- Draft: 20 ft (6.1 m)
- Speed: 16.3 knots (18.8 mph; 30.2 km/h) surfaced; 17.4 knots (20.0 mph; 32.2 km/h) submerged
- Test depth: 700 ft (210 m)
- Complement: 8 officers and 75 men
- Armament: 8 × 21 inch (533 mm) torpedo tubes (6 forward, 2 aft)

USS Trout (SS-566), a Tang-class submarine, was the second ship of the United States Navy to be named for the trout.

== Construction and commissioning ==
The contract to build Trout was awarded to the Electric Boat Division of the General Dynamics Corporation of Groton, Connecticut, on 14 May 1948 and her keel was laid down there on 1 December 1949. She was launched on 21 August 1951, sponsored by Mrs. Albert H. Clark, the widow of Lieutenant Commander Albert H. Clark, the last commanding officer of the previous U.S. Navy ship of the name, Trout (SS-202). Trout was commissioned on 27 June 1952.

== Service history ==
=== Atlantic Fleet service ===
Trout operated out of New London, Connecticut, as a unit of Submarine Squadron 10 from 1952 to 1959. During this period, she conducted training and readiness operations with ships of the United States Atlantic Fleet and North Atlantic Treaty Organization nations, operating from the North Atlantic Ocean to the Caribbean Sea. She engaged in sonar evaluation tests, antisubmarine warfare exercises, and submerged simulated attack exercises. During submerged exercises in Arctic waters in company with her sister ship Harder, Trout transited 268 nautical miles (496 km; 308 mi) beneath ice floes off Newfoundland, Canada, setting a submerged distance record for a conventionally powered submarine.

In August 1959, Trout shifted her home port to Charleston, South Carolina, where she was assigned to Submarine Squadron 4. She deployed to the Mediterranean Sea in September 1959 for her first tour of duty with the United States Sixth Fleet. In December 1959, while returning home, she represented the United States at Bergen, Norway, during the 50th anniversary celebrations commemorating the birth of the Royal Norwegian Navy's submarine arm.

In February 1960, Trout performed as a test bed for U.S. Navy Bureau of Ships shock tests. She won her first Battle Efficiency Award (Battle "E") in 1961. In early 1963, she rendered services to the Operational Test and Evaluation Force before commencing a six-month overhaul at Charleston in July 1963.

During the remaining years of the 1960s, Trout made three more Mediterranean deployments to serve as a unit of the Sixth Fleet. Between deployments, she participated in training and developmental exercises off the United States East Coast and in the Caribbean Sea.

=== Pacific Fleet service ===
In July 1970, Trout was assigned to the United States Pacific Fleet. From her new home port at San Diego, California, Trout conducted two Western Pacific deployments, one in 1972 and one in 1975, primarily providing submarine services during antisubmarine warfare exercises conducted by warships of the United States Navy, the Republic of Korea Navy, or the Republic of China Navy. Between these deployments, she participated in antisubmarine warfare exercises and conducted local operations off the Southern California coast, punctuating this service with weapons tests in the Pacific Northwest, operating out of Puget Sound in Washington.

After returning from her second Western Pacific deployment to San Diego on 29 January 1976, Trout enjoyed a brief unusual duty — repeatedly diving and surfacing while being filmed to portray the fictitious U.S. Navy nuclear submarine USS Neptune in the opening credits of the 1978 movie Gray Lady Down.

== Decommissioning and transfer to Iran ==
Trout received orders on 1 December 1976 changing her home port to Philadelphia, Pennsylvania. In 1977 and 1978, Trout underwent an extensive overhaul at the Philadelphia Naval Shipyard at Philadelphia in anticipation of a planned transfer to the Imperial Iranian Navy. Upon completion of the overhaul in 1978, Trout's home port was shifted to New London, Connecticut, where a training period for her the Iranian crew ensued. The training program was completed on 19 December 1978, and that day the U.S. Navy simultaneously decommissioned Trout, struck her from the Naval Vessel Register, and transferred her to Iran.

The Imperial Iranian Navy renamed her Imperial Iranian Ship (IIS) Kousseh (SS 101), meaning "Shark". Her Iranian crew took control of her at New London in December 1978, but abandoned her there in March 1979 following the Iranian Revolution. Kousseh was returned to Philadelphia, where she languished for many years while the United States resolved financial matters related to her abortive transfer to Iran.

== Return to U.S. custody and later use ==
Kousseh finally was returned officially to U.S. custody in 1992. She was sold at scrap value to the U.S. Navy's Program Executive Office for Undersea Warfare in 1994. She was towed by the tugboat Puma from the Massachusetts Towing Company and moored at Pier 2 at the Naval Station in Newport, Rhode Island. She was then acquired by the Naval Air Warfare Center Aircraft Division Key West Detachment at Key West, Florida, for use by the Naval Air Systems Command Marine and Targets Detachment as a remotely controlled submersible sonar target ship, as an underwater acoustic target for antisubmarine warfare research and development, in operational testing, and for training.

== Disposal ==
After completing that service, she was towed to the Naval Inactive Ship Maintenance Facility at Philadelphia, where the U.S. Navy held her for donation to a museum, but all preservation efforts failed. In May 2008 Esco Marine of Brownsville, Texas, was awarded a contract to scrap her, and her scrapping was completed on 27 February 2009.

== Awards ==
- Battle Efficiency Award
- National Defense Service Medal with star (2 awards)
