= İnciraltı Sea Museum =

Naval museum in İzmir, Turkey

Coordinates: 38.4121°N 27.0340°E

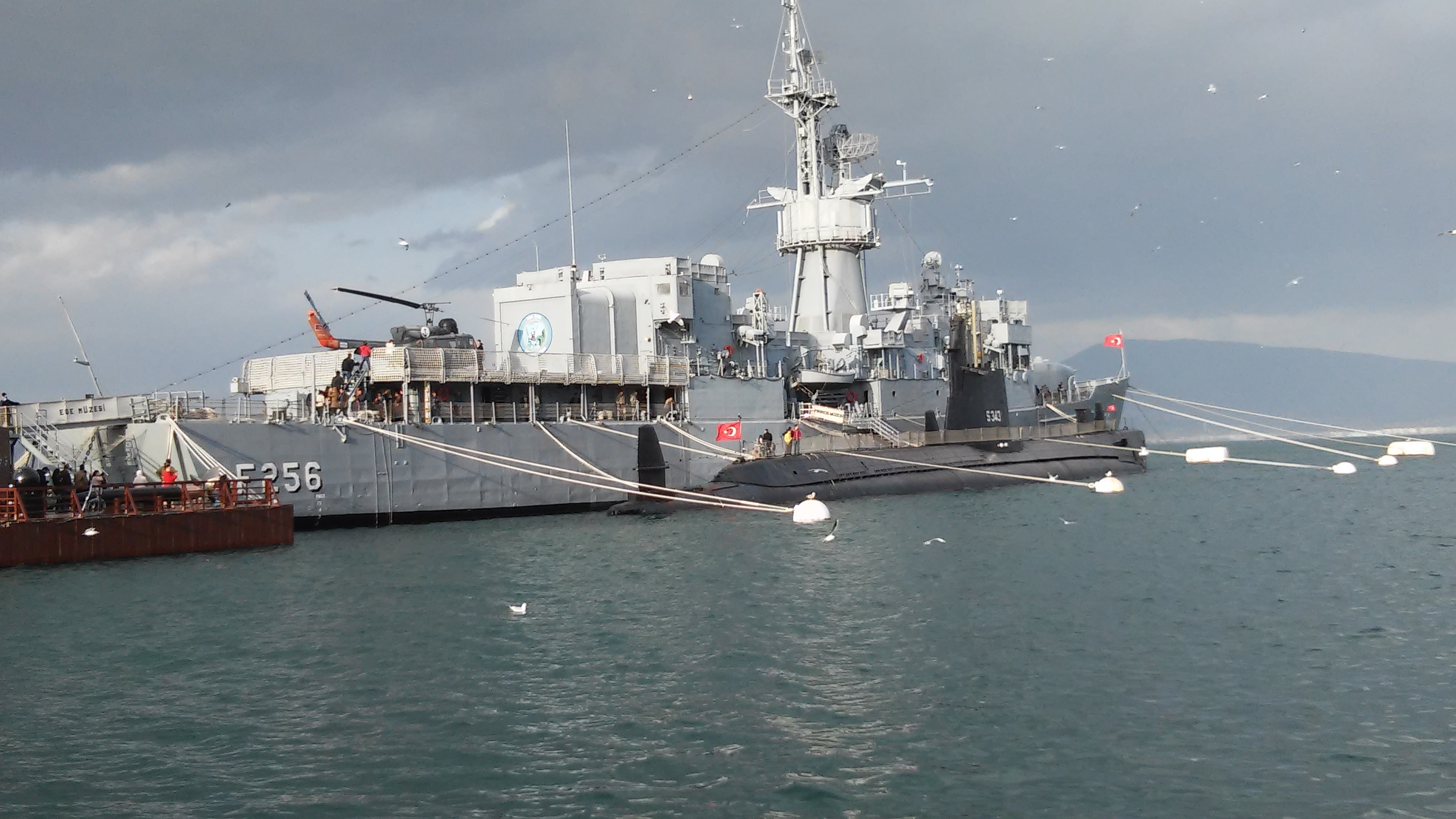
- İnciraltı Sea Museum, TCG Pirireis (S-343) & TCG Ege (F 256)

The İnciraltı Sea Museum is a naval museum in the İnciraltı neighborhood of Balçova district in İzmir, Turkey. Located near the İnciraltı Ozdilek Shopping Center, it was opened on July 1, 2007.

Main attractions of the museum are two decommissioned naval vessels of the Turkish Navy, the submarine TCG Pirireis (S 343) (the former USS Tang (SS-563)) and the frigate TCG Ege (F 256) (the former USS Ainsworth (FF-1090)). There are also other exhibits at the museum.
