= Tang-class submarine =

Class of diesel-electric submarine by US Navy

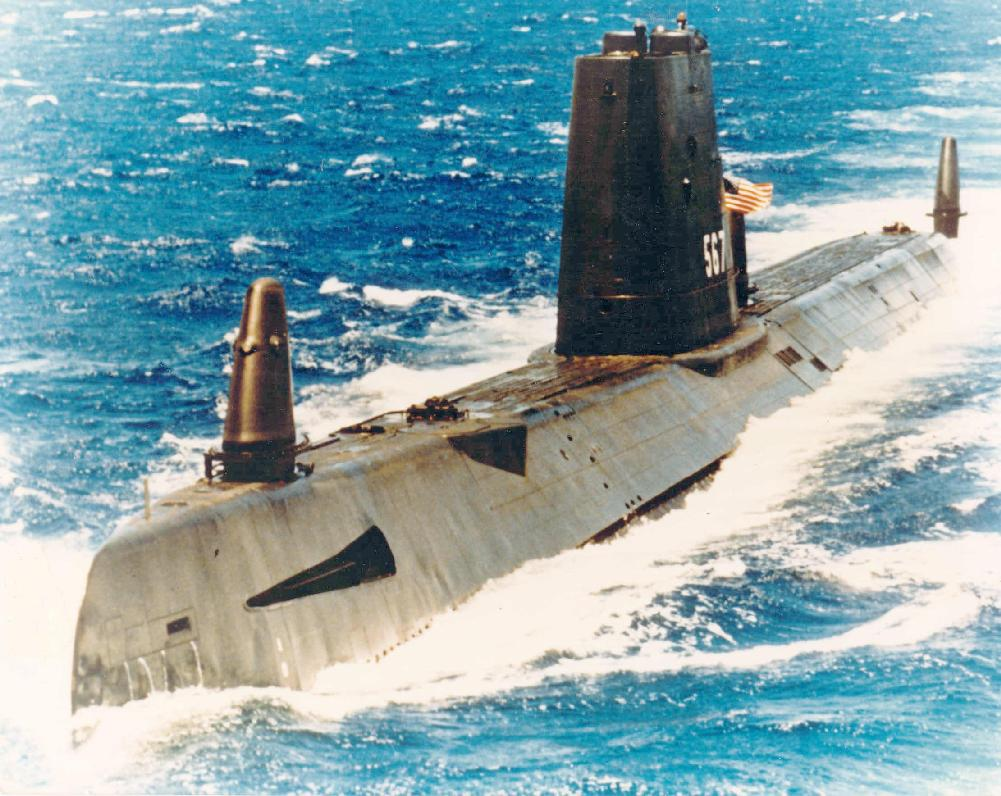
- USS Gudgeon (the three distinctive shark-fin domes are the PUFFS sonar, one is just aft of the sail, below the flag).

Class overview
- Name: Tang class
- Builders: Portsmouth Naval Shipyard; Electric Boat Company
- Operators: United States Navy
- Preceded by: Barracuda class
- Succeeded by: Grayback class; USS Nautilus; USS Darter
- Built: 1949–1952
- In commission: 1951–1983
- Completed: 6
- Retired: 6
- Preserved: 2

General characteristics
- Type: Submarine
- Displacement: 1,560–2,050 long tons (1,585–2,083 t) surfaced; 2,260–2,700 long tons (2,296–2,743 t) submerged
- Length: 268 ft (82 m), extended to 277 ft (84 m), then to 292 ft (89 m)
- Beam: 27 ft (8.2 m)
- Draft: 17 ft (5.2 m)
- Propulsion: four GM 16-338 "pancake" diesel engines (4,000 shp (3,000 kW) total), replaced by three Fairbanks Morse 38D8-1/8 opposed piston engines (4,800 shp (3,600 kW) total), two electric motors (4,700 shp (3,500 kW) total), four 126-cell batteries, two shafts
- Speed: 15.5 kn (28.7 km/h; 17.8 mph) surfaced; 18.3 kn (33.9 km/h; 21.1 mph) submerged
- Range: 11,500 nmi (21,300 km) at 10 kn (19 km/h; 12 mph) surfaced
- Endurance: 1 hour at 17.5 kn (32.4 km/h; 20.1 mph) on battery
- Test depth: 700 ft (210 m)
- Complement: 8 officers, 75 enlisted
- Armament: 8 × 21-inch (533 mm) torpedo tubes (6 forward, 2 aft), 26 torpedoes

The Tang-class submarines were the first submarines designed (under project SCB 2) and built by the United States Navy after World War II. They incorporated the best features of the high-speed German Type XXI U-boat and the venerable U.S. Navy fleet submarine. The Tang class, with the fleet submarines converted under the Greater Underwater Propulsion Power (GUPPY) program, had much higher submerged performance than their predecessors, but were quickly surpassed by the nuclear-propelled submarines that entered service beginning in 1954. Six units in total were built.

== Design ==
Probably the most important innovation of the Tangs, and their primary advantage over contemporary GUPPY conversions, was an increase in test depth from 400 ft (120 m) to 700 ft (210 m), achieved with the same High Tensile Steel (HTS; 42,000 psi (290 MPa) yield strength) as the Balao and Tench classes. This allowed the class to take advantage of deeper ocean conditions to evade sonar, as well as maneuver more safely at moderate depths.

An unsuccessful innovation of the Tang design was the General Motors EMD 16-338 lightweight, compact, high-speed "pancake" engine, rated at 1,000 bhp. Very different from the classic diesel engines that nearly all preceding submarines used, which were laid out with a horizontal crankshaft, this new engine had a vertical crankshaft, and the cylinders were arranged radially like an aircraft engine. Four of these 13 1/2-foot-tall (4.1 m), 4-foot-wide (1.2 m), eight-ton engines could be installed in a single engine room, thus deleting an entire compartment from the submarine's design. The goal was to reduce overall length, as testing had shown that shorter submarines were more maneuverable, especially in depth, and had less submerged drag. Four compact Guppy-type 126-cell lead–acid batteries were installed to provide a high sustained submerged speed. The overall design allowed for a 25 kn (46 km/h) top speed and possible future propulsion replacement with a Type XVII U-boat-derived hydrogen peroxide turbine, closed-cycle diesel system, or even a nuclear power plant. However, attempts to develop the first two systems were unsuccessful, and nuclear power plants proved too large to be accommodated in the Tang-class hull.

When the boats went to sea in the early 1950s, the new engines did not work well. Their compact, high-speed design made them difficult to maintain, and they tended to leak oil into their generators. In 1956, the Navy decided to replace the pancake engines with three ten-cylinder Fairbanks-Morse opposed-piston 38D 8-1/8 diesels. These were similar to those of late-war World War II boats, but uprated from 1,350 shp (1,010 kW) to 1,600 shp (1,200 kW) each. To accommodate the larger engines, the boats had to be lengthened some nine feet in the engine room (three additional frames between frames 69 and 70). Accordingly, in 1957 and 1958, the first four Tangs were lengthened, while Gudgeon and Harder, still on the ways, were built to the new length with the new engines. This propulsion plant was used for almost all subsequent US conventional submarines.

The torpedo tubes were also redesigned. The six forward tubes now used air-powered piston ejection pumps, which forced a slug of water through a slide valve behind the torpedo to push it out, rather than the pulse of air used in previous designs. Because this design is somewhat quieter and does not release an air bubble every time a torpedo is fired, it has been used in all subsequent submarine designs throughout the world. The four stern tubes of previous classes were reduced to two shorter, simpler tubes that could not accommodate the longer anti-ship torpedoes and had no capability to actively eject torpedoes. Rather, they were designed for the Mark 27 and planned Mark 37 swim-out torpedoes.

== Boats in class ==
In October 1946, the first two boats were ordered. Tang was built at Portsmouth Naval Shipyard; Trigger at the Electric Boat yard in Groton, Connecticut. In 1947, contracts were awarded to Portsmouth for Wahoo and to Electric Boat for Trout. Then in 1948, a similar pair of contracts were awarded to Portsmouth for Gudgeon and to Electric Boat for Harder. They are named for six US submarines lost during World War II, of which most of their commanding officers were killed in action while combating Japanese surface vessels.

Name	Hull number	Builder	Laid Down	Launched	Commissioned	Decommissioned	Period of service	Fate
Tang	SS-563	Portsmouth Naval Shipyard	18 April 1949	19 June 1951	25 October 1951	8 February 1980	28.3	Transferred to Turkey 6 August 1987, decommissioned 2004, preserved as a museum
Trigger	SS-564	Electric Boat	24 February 1949	14 June 1951	31 March 1952	2 July 1973	21.3	Transferred to Italy 10 July 1973, decommissioned 28 February 1986 and fate unknown.
Wahoo	SS-565	Portsmouth Naval Shipyard	24 October 1949	16 October 1951	30 May 1952	27 June 1980	28.0	Scrapped 1984
Trout	SS-566	Electric Boat	1 December 1949	21 August 1951	27 June 1952	2 January 1977	24.5	Transferred to Iran 19 December 1978, transfer rescinded March 1979, in limbo 1979–92, USN sonar testbed 1994–2007, scrapped 2008
Gudgeon	SS-567	Portsmouth Naval Shipyard	20 May 1950	11 June 1952	21 November 1952	30 September 1983	30.8	Transferred to Turkey 1983, decommissioned 2004, preserved as a museum
Harder	SS-568	Electric Boat	30 June 1950	3 December 1951	19 August 1952	31 January 1974	21.4	Transferred to Italy 18 August 1974, decommissioned and scrapped 1988.

In 1967, Tang, Wahoo, Gudgeon, and Harder received an additional 15-foot (4.6 m) section (five additional frames between frames 42 and 43) to accommodate the BQG-4 Passive Underwater Fire Control Feasibility System (PUFFS) passive ranging sonar installation, with three tall domes added topside, and additional fire control equipment that enabled the use of the Mark 45 nuclear torpedo. This left the boats similar in size and capability to the GUPPY III conversions.

== Museum ships ==
Two boats of this class, TCG Pirireis (ex-Tang) and TCG Hizirreis (ex-Gudgeon), are preserved as museum ships in Turkey. Pirireis is at the İnciraltı Sea Museum in İzmir, and Hizirreis is at the Kocaeli Museum Ships Command in Izmit.

== See also ==
Equivalent submarines of the same era

- Zulu class
- Porpoise class
- Narval class
