= Passive Underwater Fire Control Feasibility System =

Passive sonar system for submarines

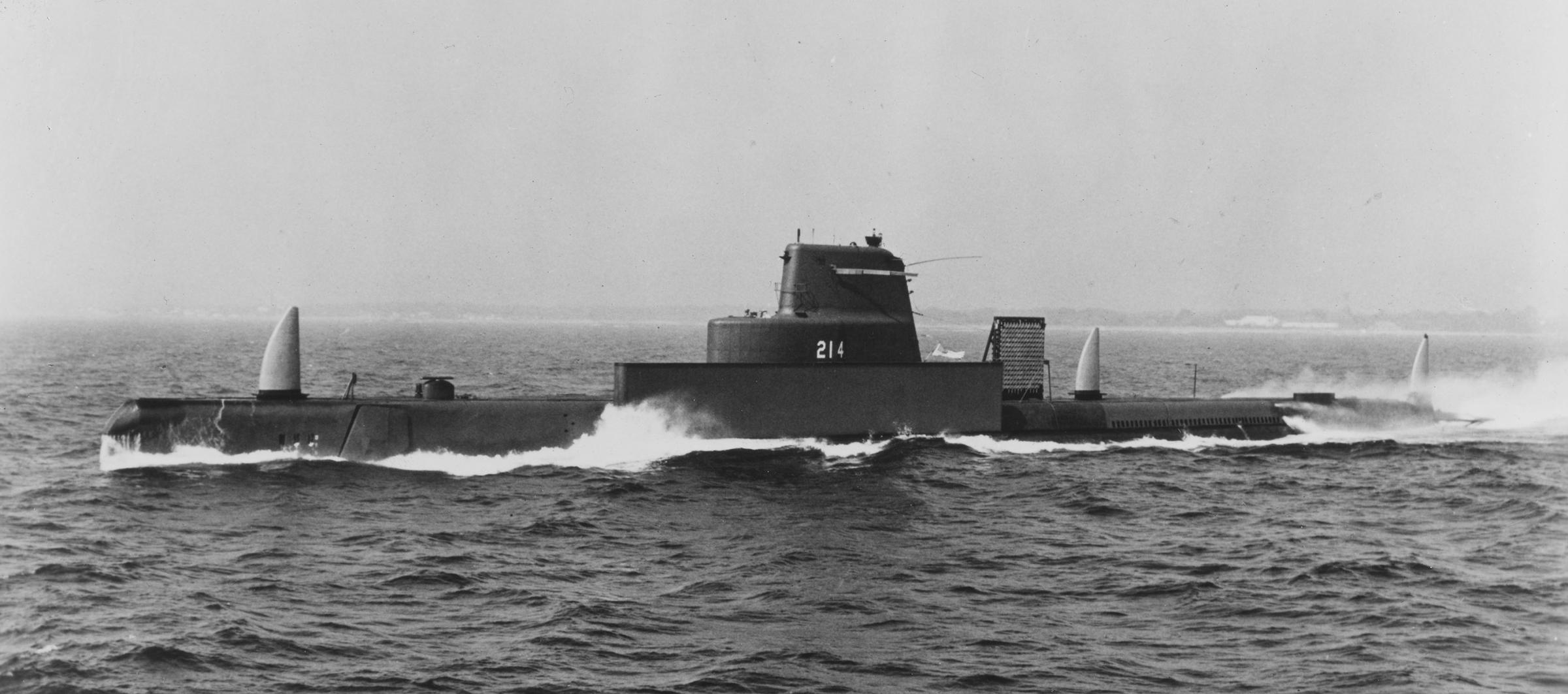
Experimental submarine USS Grouper (AGSS-214) showing PUFFS domes, ca. 1961

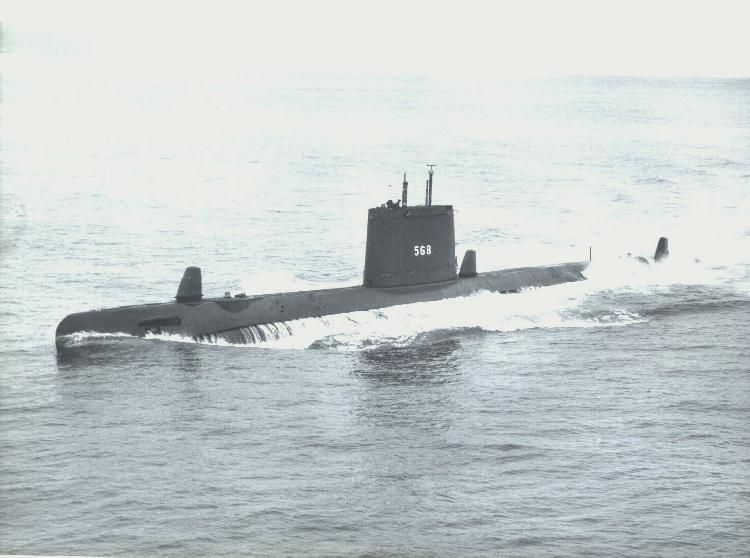
USS Harder (SS-568) with the three distinctive shark-fin PUFFS domes

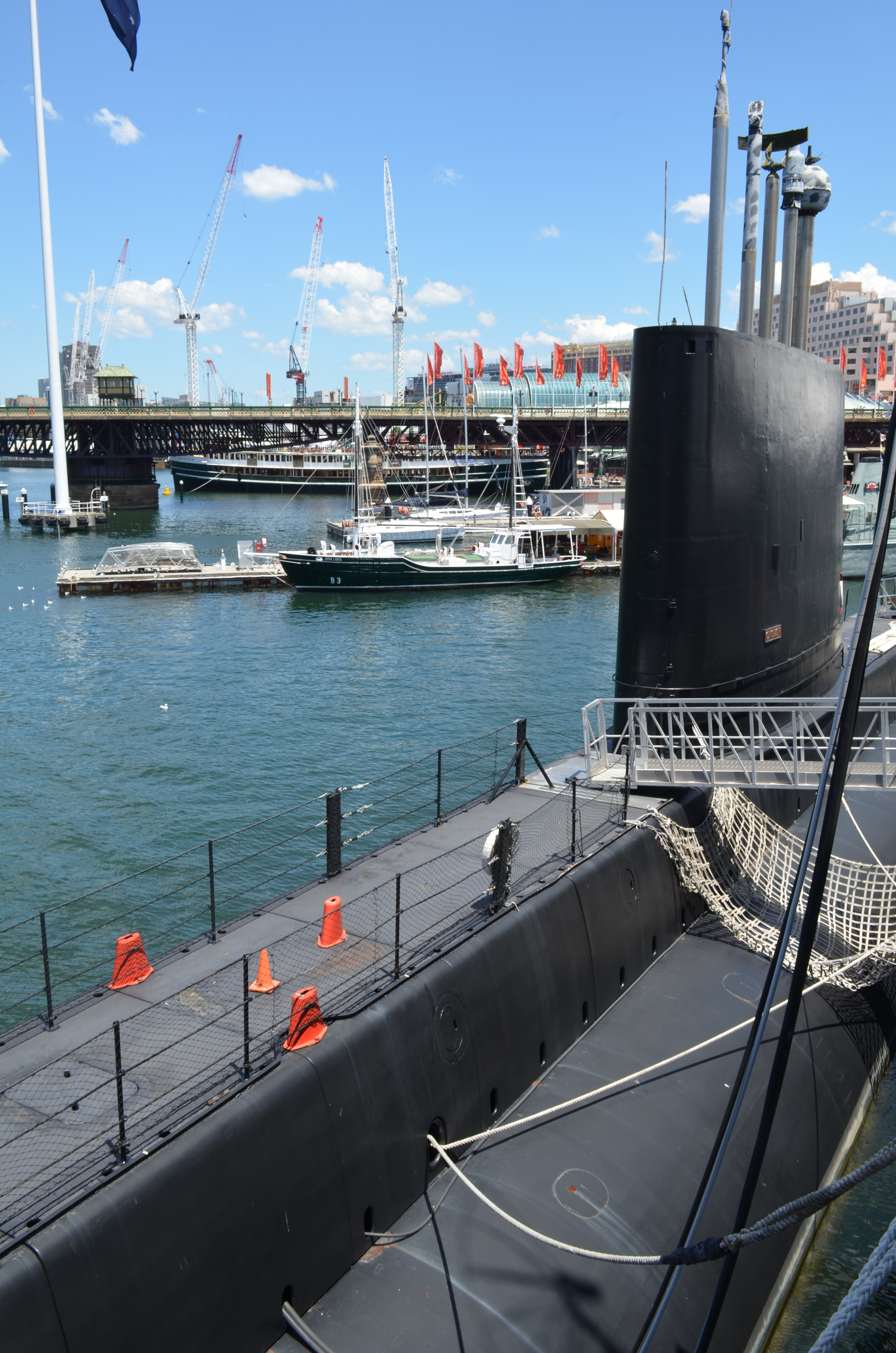
Fin and central section of HMAS Onslow. The three orange covers on the casing are protective sheathes over the submarine's Micropuffs sonar

Passive Underwater Fire Control Feasibility System (or Study) (PUFFS) is a passive sonar system for submarines. It was designated AN/BQG-4 and was primarily installed on United States Navy conventional submarines built in the 1950s beginning with the Tang class, and also those converted to GUPPY III or otherwise modernized in the 1960s. It was also equipped on the nuclear-powered USS Tullibee (SSN-597). It was also installed on the USS Thomas A. Edison (SSBN-610) but never achieved operational status. Its transducers can be seen on pictures of the vessel. A version known as "Micropuffs" was fitted on Oberon-class submarines for the Royal Australian Navy, and as Type 2041 on the Upholder-class for the British Royal Navy. This class still serves in the Royal Canadian Navy as the Victoria class, where Micropuffs is known as BQG-501. The system is notable for three tall, fin-like domes topside, except on Micropuffs installations (Tullibee had the second dome built into the aft end of the sail). The system was retained on several submarines transferred by the US to foreign navies. It was associated with long-range passive detection of targets for the Mark 45 nuclear torpedo and other weapons. Most submarines backfitted with it were also lengthened 12–16 feet (3.7–4.9 m) to accommodate additional electronics and plotting rooms. It was also planned for Thresher and Sturgeon class nuclear submarines, but was not fitted on them except Micropuffs experimentally on Barb and Haddock. With the exception of the four Canadian Victoria-class submarines, all PUFFS-equipped submarines have been disposed of or preserved as museum ships.

== See also ==
- Greater Underwater Propulsion Power Program (GUPPY)
