= USS Harder (SS-568) =

Submarine of the United States

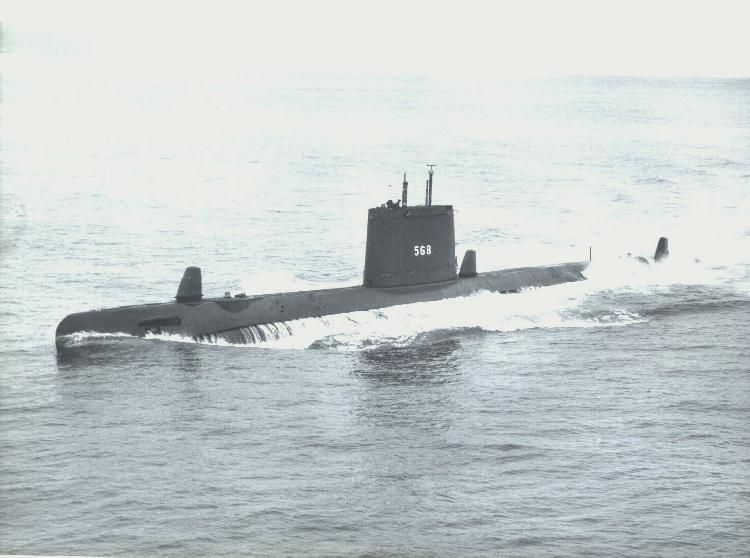
- USS Harder (the three distinctive shark-fin domes are the PUFFS sonar).

History

United States
- Name: USS Harder
- Builder: Electric Boat Company
- Laid down: 30 June 1950
- Launched: 3 December 1951
- Commissioned: 19 August 1952
- Decommissioned: 31 January 1974
- Stricken: 20 February 1974
- Identification: SS-568
- Fate: Sold to Italy, 1974

Italy
- Name: Romeo Romei
- Commissioned: 18 August 1974
- Decommissioned: 31 May 1988
- Identification: S 516

General characteristics
- Class & type: Tang-class submarine Attack submarine
- Displacement: 2,050 long tons (2,083 t) surfaced; 2,700 long tons (2,743 t) submerged
- Length: 277 ft 2 in (84.48 m)
- Beam: 27 ft 3 in (8.31 m)
- Draft: 17 ft (5.2 m)
- Speed: 15.5 knots (17.8 mph; 28.7 km/h) surfaced; 18.3 knots (21.1 mph; 33.9 km/h) submerged
- Test depth: 213 m (699 ft)
- Complement: 8 officers and 75 men
- Armament: 8 × 21 inch (533 mm) torpedo tubes (6 forward, 2 aft)

USS Harder (SS-568), a Tang-class submarine, was the second ship of the United States Navy to be named for the harder, a fish of the mullet family found off South Africa.

== Construction and commissioning ==
Harder′s keel was laid down by the Electric Boat Company in Groton, Connecticut, on 30 June 1950. She was launched on 3 December 1951, sponsored by Kay Logan Cole, the widow of Lieutenant S. M. Logan, executive officer of the submarine USS Harder (SS-257), lost during World War II. Harder was commissioned on 19 August 1952.

== Service history ==
After shakedown out of Newport, Rhode Island, Harder made a 1000-mile (1600-km) submerged passage from New London, Connecticut, to Nassau, Bahamas, while snorkeling. She then engaged in tests out of New London to evaluate fast attack type submarines.

Harder began fleet operations out of New London in June 1953. Shortly thereafter Harder departed for the British Isles. During this voyage, she experienced mechanical difficulties with her then-experimental Fairbanks type 3 engines. In August 1953, her engines broke down completely off the east coast of Ireland. She was taken under tow by USS Tringa and endured the longest tow in submarine history, 2100 miles (3400 km) across the Atlantic to New London, Connecticut.

During the next several years Harder carried out a schedule of training and readiness operations with ships of the Atlantic Fleet and Allied NATO nations. Operating from the North Atlantic to the Caribbean Sea, she engaged in sonar evaluation tests, supported ASW tactical exercises, and participated in submerged simulated attack operations. In March 1959 she participated in SUBICEX, during which she cruised 280 miles (450 km) beneath the ice packs off Newfoundland, further than any conventionally powered submarine had previously gone.

After completing a three-month advanced submarine exercise in the Atlantic, Harder switched her home port to Charleston, South Carolina, where she arrived 17 November and joined Submarine Squadron 4. She continued operations in the Atlantic and Caribbean for more than a year, then departed Charleston 24 May 1961 for deployment off the western coast of Europe and in the Mediterranean Sea. After reaching Bremerhaven, Germany, on 9 June, she supported ASW operations with ships of the Federal German Navy. The following month she sailed via Holy Loch, Scotland, and Rota, Spain, to the Mediterranean Sea where she supported peace-keeping operations of the 6th Fleet. Harder returned to Charleston 28 August.

Training exercises and tests evaluating ASROC and other ASW systems kept Harder busy until she entered Charleston Naval Shipyard for overhaul in October 1962.Ready for action in April 1963, she operated along the Atlantic Coast and in the Caribbean Sea for the next 2½ years polishing her underwater warfare tactics and operating with destroyer-type ships as they worked on ASW exercises.

Harder again entered Charleston Naval Shipyard on 22 October for a thorough overhaul and modernization in which she received an 18-foot hull extension to accommodate the new PUFFS passive sonar system, a redesigned superstructure, new engines, and improved electrical and electronic equipment. Modernization completed early in 1967, Harder rejoined the fleet.

== Romeo Romei (S 516) ==
Harder was decommissioned on 31 January 1974, struck from the Naval Vessel Register on 20 February 1974, and sold to Italy.

Commissioned on 18 August 1974 as Romeo Romei, ex-Harder served the Italian Navy until she was decommissioned and scrapped in 1988.
