= USS Tang (SS-563) =

American submarine

Coordinates: 38°24′45″N 27°02′05″E

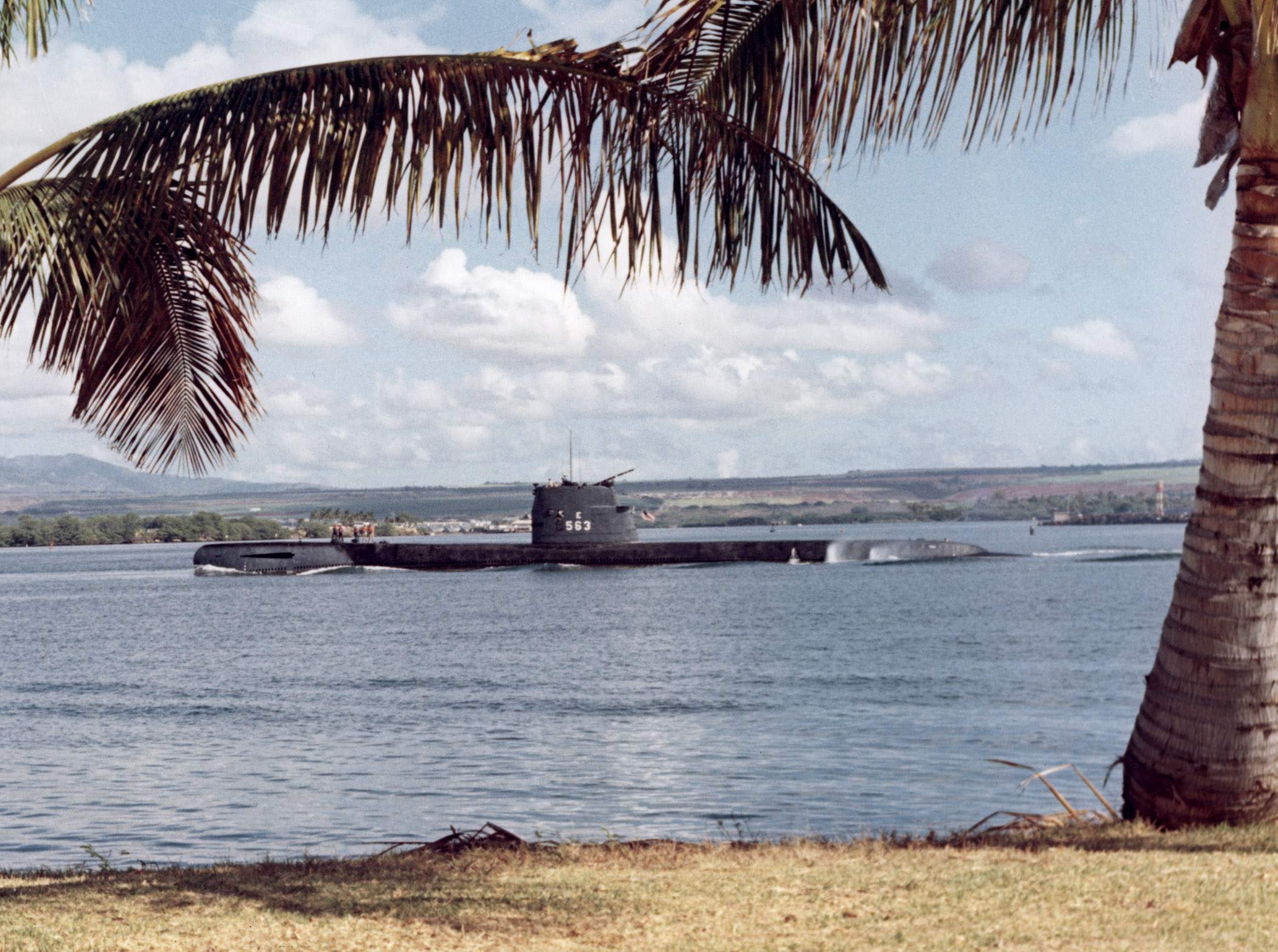
- USS Tang leaving Pearl Harbor

History

United States
- Name: USS Tang
- Awarded: 16 May 1947
- Builder: Portsmouth Naval Shipyard
- Laid down: 18 April 1949
- Launched: 19 June 1951
- Commissioned: 25 October 1951
- Decommissioned: 8 February 1980
- Fate: Leased to Turkey, 8 February 1980; Sold to Turkey, 1987
- Stricken: 6 August 1987

Turkey
- Name: Pirireis
- Acquired: 8 February 1980
- Commissioned: 8 February 1980
- Decommissioned: August 2004
- Identification: S343
- Fate: Museum ship

General characteristics
- Class & type: Tang-class submarine Attack submarine
- Displacement: 1,616 long tons (1,642 t) surfaced; 2,100 long tons (2,134 t) submerged
- Length: 269 ft (82 m) originally; 287 ft (87 m) after rebuild
- Beam: 27 ft (8.2 m)
- Draft: 17 ft (5.2 m)
- Speed: 16.3 knots (18.8 mph; 30.2 km/h) surfaced; 17.4 knots (20.0 mph; 32.2 km/h) submerged
- Complement: 87 officers and men
- Armament: 8 × 21 inch (533 mm) torpedo tubes (6 forward, 2 aft); 40 × Mk 49/57 mines

USS Tang (SS/AGSS-563), the lead ship of her class, was the second ship of the United States Navy to be named for the tang.

She was the first American submarine designed (as opposed to modified) under the Greater Underwater Propulsion Power Program (GUPPY) for underwater performance rather than surfaced speed and handling. Key features included removing the deck guns, streamlining the outer hull, replacing the conning tower with a sail, installing new propellers designed for submerged operations, installing more air conditioning and a snorkel mast, and doubling the battery capacity.

The contract to build her was awarded to the Portsmouth Naval Shipyard on 16 May 1947. Her keel was laid down on 18 April 1949. She was launched on 19 June 1951 sponsored by Mrs. Ernestine O'Kane, the wife of Richard H. O'Kane, and commissioned on 25 October 1951 with Commander Enders P. Huey in command.

== Service history ==
Following trials and training along the east coast, the submarine was assigned to Submarine Squadron 1 (SUBRON 1), Submarine Force, Pacific Fleet. From her base at Pearl Harbor, Tang operated in the Hawaiian Islands, providing services to surface and air antisubmarine warfare (ASW) forces. She also conducted type training. In October 1953, Tang commenced her first overhaul which she completed in July 1954.

Upon emerging from the yard, the submarine began training for her first western Pacific deployment. That cruise began in September and ended at Pearl Harbor in March 1956. She then operated in the Hawaiian area until June, when she headed back to sea for a training cruise in Alaskan waters. Tang returned to Pearl Harbor in August and, soon thereafter, began her second overhaul.

On 20 July 1956, Tang put to sea on her second deployment to the western Pacific. That deployment set the pattern for seven more between then and 1972. The submarine came under the command of the Commander, Seventh Fleet, and provided training services to units of the Japanese Maritime Self Defense Force, the Nationalist Chinese Navy, SEATO naval forces, and the United States Navy. When not cruising Far Eastern waters, she operated among the Hawaiian Islands and underwent overhauls at the Pearl Harbor Naval Shipyard.

In May 1958 she rescued 5 CIA officers and some PRRI rebels off the western coast of Sumatra. The officers were fleeing Indonesian central government's army after leading a failed rebellion in Sumatra.

On five occasions during those years, she cruised to the northwestern coast of North America. In March 1959, during a cold weather training cruise, Tang tested a newly developed snorkel de-icer system. In addition, the submarine provided services to the Naval Torpedo Testing Station at Keyport, Washington, and to Canadian naval forces at Esquimalt, British Columbia. She returned to the Pacific Northwest in late February 1961, following her fourth overhaul at Pearl Harbor, for shakedown training and participation in a First Fleet Exercise, SLAMEX.

Two years later, she made her third voyage to the northwestern coast of the United States; this time to join in First Fleet ASW exercises. In May and June 1964, Tang made a post-overhaul shakedown cruise to the west coast. During Tang's return trip from the west coast shakedown cruise, the destroyers Maddox and Turner Joy had come under hostile fire (See Gulf of Tonkin Incident). As soon as Tang reached Pearl Harbor, she received orders to West-Pac and deployed three days later. Tang reached the Philippines 21 days later with a failed KVA, but upon making repairs went on patrol to the Straits of Formosa. She returned to Pearl Harbor in March, 1965 after completing multiple patrols supporting the Vietnam War and also in various other regions of the Western Pacific. All members of the crew received the Armed Forces Expeditionary Medal for Vietnam. During the remainder of 1965, Tang conducted various training exercises in the Hawaiian Islands. On 1 January 1966 Tang again deployed to West-Pac in support of the Vietnam War. During one patrol, the entire crew received the Navy Expeditionary Medal. Four years and two deployments later, Tang made her fifth and last voyage to the west coast while still homeported at Pearl Harbor. Two months later, she resumed local operations in the Hawaiian Islands before embarking upon her eighth deployment to the western Pacific in mid-January 1969.

Tang's ninth deployment came after a period of repairs and intense training around Hawaii and lasted from August 1970 until February 1971. Upon her return to Pearl Harbor, she resumed local operations until August, when she again entered the Pearl Harbor Naval Shipyard for extensive repairs and refurbishments, extensive sail modifications, and a hull stretch during which the boat was cut completely in two and a new section inserted to provide space for an extensive sonar, electronic and ventilation modernization. The modernization included both the PUFFS passive sonar and Prairie Masker installation. At the completion of these overhauls, Tang was more than 600 tons heavier and more than 22 feet longer than when originally launched.

In May 1972, she left the yard with a new AGSS hull classification symbol and began preparation for changing home port to San Diego, California. Following ten days at sea and two at San Francisco, Tang arrived at the Naval Submarine Facility at San Diego. There, she joined Submarine Division 32 of SubRon 3. The ensuing year brought ASW operations with destroyers and air units followed by a two-month restricted availability at the Mare Island Naval Shipyard and a return to normal operations. On 2 April 1973, she put to sea for the tenth western Pacific deployment of her career. During it, she again participated in surface and air ASW exercises with units of the Seventh Fleet and of various Allied navies. After visiting Yokosuka, Sasebo, Chinhae, Kaohsiung, and Pusan, Tang returned to San Diego on 12 October 1973. She resumed local operations after a 30-day standdown period, then made preparations for a deployment to South American waters for Exercise UNITAS XV. On 2 October 1974, she headed south to conduct training exercises with surface units and submarines of the United States, Chilean, and Peruvian navies. At the completion of UNITAS XV, Tang visited Acapulco, Mexico, before returning to San Diego on 16 December, for Christmas standdown. Throughout 1975, she continued to conduct normal operations out of San Diego.

On 11 January 1976, Tang commenced overhaul at Mare Island Naval Shipyard where she remained until completion on 20 January 1977. With the exception of a brief MIDPAC deployment in March, Tang operated out of her home port of San Diego for the remainder of 1977 and the first half of 1978. On 1 August, her home port was changed to Groton, Connecticut and her SS hull classification symbol was restored in anticipation of her forthcoming inter-fleet transfer.

Tang departed San Diego on 23 August, and, following a transit of the Panama Canal, arrived at Groton on 30 September. For the remainder of 1978, she engaged in her new primary mission-training Iranian Navy personnel as well as providing service to units of the Atlantic Fleet. Tang and two of her sisters were to be transferred to Iran, but the deal was canceled due to the 1979 Iranian Revolution. Instead the submarine was leased to Turkey. During this period "Tang" participated in a number of ASW exercises including participation in a major ASW exercise and visit to Halifax, Nova Scotia as well an exercise and visit to Guantanamo Bay Cuba.

== TCG Pirireis (S 343) ==
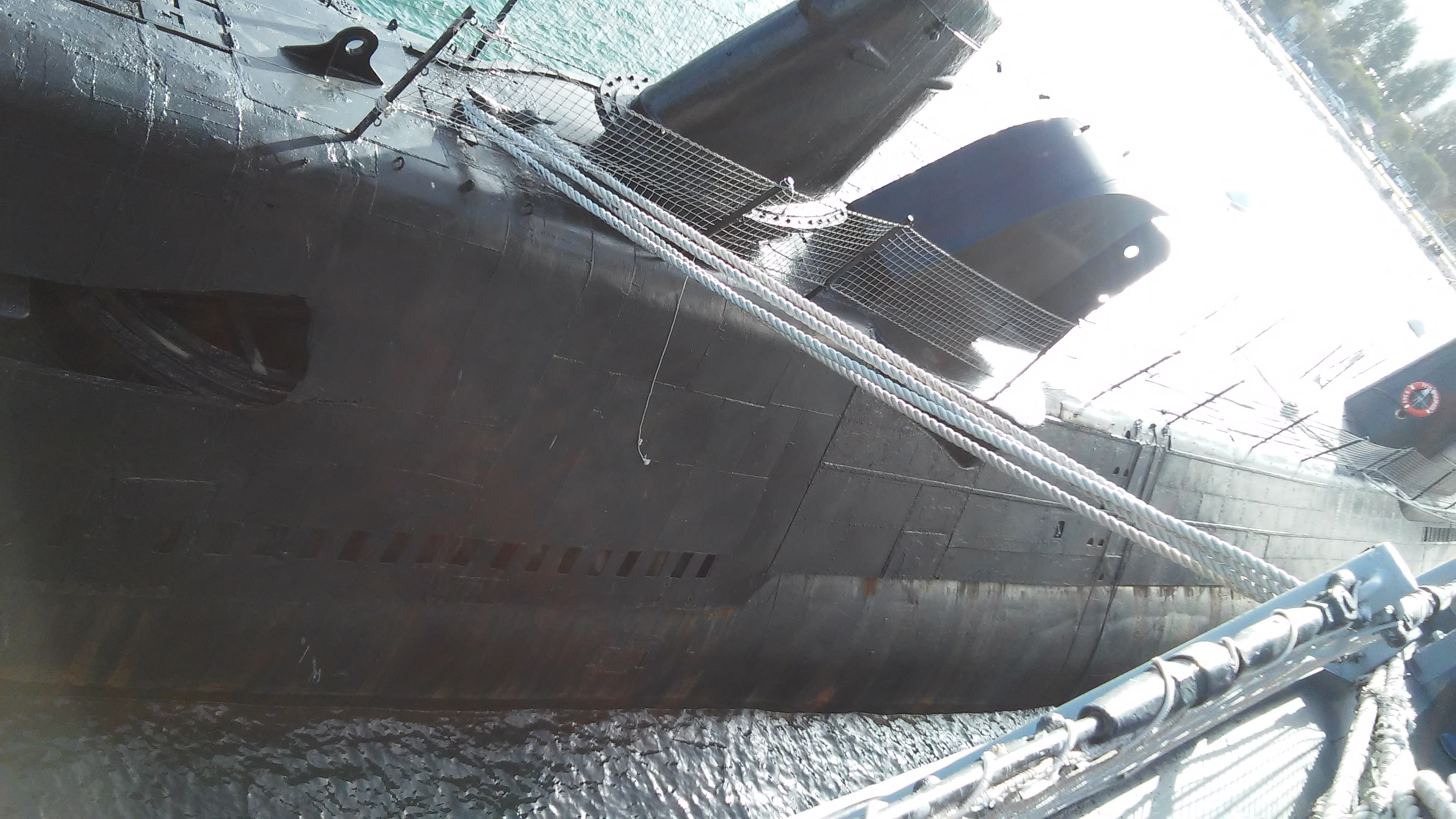
The TCG Pirires at the İnciraltı Sea Museum

On 8 February 1980, the oldest diesel-electric submarine in the Navy and the last operational one in the Atlantic Fleet at that time was decommissioned. Tang was struck from the U.S. Naval Vessel Register (NVR) on 6 August 1987. Tang was transferred to the Turkish Navy becoming the TCG Pirireis (S 343), after Ottoman-Turkish admiral Piri Reis. Pirireis served in the Turkish Submarine Forces until she was decommissioned in August 2004. The boat is currently preserved at İnciraltı Sea Museum, in İzmir, Turkey.

== Awards ==
- National Defense Service Medal with star (2 awards)
- Armed Forces Expeditionary Medal
- Vietnam Service Medal with four campaign stars for Vietnam War service
