= Invincible (ship) =

Invincible is the name of several ships

- French ship Invincible, several ships of the name
- HMS Invincible, several ships of the name
- USS Invincible, several ships of the name
- Texan schooner Invincible, part of the Revolutionary Texas Navy (1836–1837)
- Invincible (schooner), used as a transport by the US Army from 1849 to 1851
- RSS Invincible, a Republic of Singapore submarine

== See also ==
- Invincible class, several ship classes of the name
