= Invincible =

Invincible may refer to:

== Film and television ==
- Invincible (2001 theatrical film), a drama by Werner Herzog about Jewish cabaret during the rise of Nazism
- Invincible (2001 TV film), a fantasy/martial arts TV movie starring Billy Zane
- Invincible (2006 film), a sports film starring Mark Wahlberg
- Invincible (2022 film), a Canadian short drama film
- Invincible (TV series), an animated streaming television series based on the Image Comics comic
- "Invincible" (Eureka), an episode of Eureka
- "Invincible" (The Flash), an episode of The Flash
- Chakra: The Invincible, a 2010 Indian animated superhero film

== Publications ==
- Invincible (comics), an Image Comics series
  - Invincible (character), the titular superhero
- Invincible (Star Wars novel), a novel in the Legacy of the Force series
- The Invincible, a novel by Stanisław Lem
- Invincible: The Games of Shusaku, a book by John Power about Go master Honinbo Shusaku

== Music ==
- Invincible (rapper), American rapper Ill Weaver

=== Albums ===
- Invincible (Five album) or the title song, 1999
- Invincible (Lemar album) or the title song (see below), 2012
- Invincible (Michael Jackson album) or the title song, 2001
- Invincible (Skillet album) or the title song, 2000
- Invincible (Two Steps from Hell album) or the title song (see below), 2010
- Invincible, by Chris Jasper, 2007
- Invincible, by Deuce, 2017

=== Songs ===
- "Invincible" (Adelitas Way song), 2009
- "Invincible" (Carola Häggkvist song), 2006
- "Invincible" (Chantal Kreviazuk song), 2009
- "Invincible" (Hedley song), 2011
- "Invincible" (Kelly Clarkson song), 2015
- "Invincible" (Lemar song), 2012
- "Invincible" (Machine Gun Kelly song), 2012
- "Invincible" (Muse song), 2007
- "Invincible" (OK Go song), 2006
- "Invincible" (Omar Apollo song), 2022
- "Invincible" (Pat Benatar song), 1985
- "Invincible" (Tinie Tempah song), 2010
- "Invincible", by Amaranthe from The Nexus, 2013
- "Invincible", by Aminé from the Spider-Man: Into the Spider-Verse soundtrack, 2018
- "Invincible", by Borgeous, 2014
- "Invincible", by Borknagar from Quintessence, 2000
- "Invincible", by Crossfade from Falling Away, 2006
- "Invincible", by Jack Rowan ft. Sam Gray competing to represent Denmark in the Eurovision Song Contest 2013
- "Invincible", by Jesse McCartney from Right Where You Want Me, 2006
- "Invincible", by Our Last Night from Age of Ignorance, 2012
- "Invincible", by Pop Smoke from Meet the Woo 2, 2020
- "Invincible", by Seventh Wonder from The Testament, 2022
- "Invincible", by Skindred from Shark Bites and Dog Fights, 2009
- "Invincible", by Static-X from Shadow Zone, 2003
- "Invincible", by Tool from Fear Inoculum, 2019
- "Invincible", by Twelve Foot Ninja from Outlier, 2016
- "Invincible", by Two Door Cinema Club from Gameshow, 2016
- "Invincible", by Two Steps from Hell from Power of Darkness and Invincible, 2010
- "Invincible", by the Wanted from Battleground, 2011

== Ships ==
- French ship Invincible, various French Navy ships
- HMS Invincible, six British Royal Navy ships
- USS Invincible, two US Navy ships
- Texan schooner Invincible, part of the Revolutionary Texas Navy (1836-1837)
- Invincible (schooner), used as a transport by the US Army from 1849 to 1851
- Invincible-class aircraft carrier, a 1980s British Royal Navy class
  - CVA-01, a 1960s cancelled British Royal Navy proposal
- Invincible-class battlecruiser, a British Royal Navy class in service from 1908 to 1921
- Invincible-class submarine (Type 218SG), a Singaporean Navy class
  - RSS Invincible, the lead ship of the class
- L'Invincible-class submarine (SNLE 3G), a French Navy class

== Other uses ==
- The Invincible (video game), a 2023 video game by Starward Industries
- Danny Invincibile (born 1979), Australian footballer
- Invincible Media Group, a media company founded by Jordan Kensington
- Invincible, a steam locomotive operating on the Isle of Wight

== See also ==
- The Invincibles (disambiguation)
- Invencible (disambiguation)
