= Invisible People =

Invisible People may refer to:

- "Invisible People" (album), a 2020 album by Chicano Batman
- Invisible People (organization), an American non-profit organization
- Invisible People, a 1993 graphic novel by Will Eisner
- "Invisible People", an Icehouse song from the album Big Wheel
- "Invisible People", a 2005 single by The Wallstones
- "Invisible People", an Ill Niño song from the album Epidemia
- "Invisible People", a Peter, Paul and Mary song from the album In These Times

== See also ==
- Invisible Men, a 1983 album by Anthony Phillips
- Invisible Women (disambiguation)
- Invisible (disambiguation)
