= The Invisibles (disambiguation) =

The Invisibles is a comic book series by Grant Morrison.

The Invisibles may also refer to:

== Literature ==
- The Invisibles, a 1903 novel by Edgar Earl Christopher
- The Invisibles, a 1968 novel by J. E. Macdonnell under the pseudonym James Dark

== Film ==
- The Invisibles (2017 film), a German holocaust docudrama directed by Claus Räfle
- The Invisibles (2024 film), a Canadian science fiction film directed by Andrew Currie

== Television ==
- "The Invisibles", episode 4 of The Herculoids segment of Space Stars
- "The Invisibles" (The Outer Limits), an episode of The Outer Limits
- The Invisibles (TV series), the BBC TV Series

== Other media ==
- "The Invisibles", a song by Suede on the 2018 album The Blue Hour

== See also ==
- Invisible (disambiguation)
- The Invincibles (disambiguation)
- The Incredibles (disambiguation)
