= Bhishm-class tugboat =

Indian naval class of tugboats

Class overview
- Name: Bhishm class
- Builders: Titagarh Shipyard
- Operators: Indian Navy
- On order: 6
- Building: 4
- Completed: 3
- Active: 2

General characteristics
- Type: General Purpose Tugboat

The Bhishm class of tugboats are a series of six 25 t (25 long tons) bollard pull tugboats being built by Titagarh Shipyard near Kolkata, for the Indian Navy.

== History ==
The contract for the construction of 6 25 t (25 long tons) bollard pull tugboats was signed on 12 November 2021 by Titagarh Shipyard and the Indian Navy (IN) at ₹169.5 crore (equivalent to ₹190 crore or US$20 million in 2023). The tugboat features a high indigenous content. Secondary roles of the tugboat also includes providing firefighting services to ships at harbour and limited search and rescue operations while at anchor. The presence of tugs will support IN's operational responsibilities by making it easier for naval vessels and submarines to berth and unberth, turn, and manoeuvre in restricted waters.

== Ships in the class ==
Ship name	Yard number	Keel laying	Launch date	Induction date	Home port
INS Bhishm	335	27 October 2022	14 January 2024		
INS Bahubali	336	27 October 2022	12 March 2024		
INS Ashva	337	3 March 2023	3 October 2024		
INS Yuvan	338	12 March 2024		26 March 2025	Visakhapatnam
INS Ojas	339		2 April 2025	27 June 2025	Visakhapatnam
INS Sabal	340		27 May 2025		

== See also ==
- Tugboats of the Indian Navy
