= The Invincibles =

The Invincibles may refer to:

== Sport ==
- The Invincibles (Australian rules football), the 1914 Port Adelaide team
- The Invincibles (cricket), the 1948 Australian team
- The Invincibles (English football), the 1888–89 Preston North End and 2003–04 Arsenal teams
- The Invincibles (rugby league), the 1982 Australian team
- The Invincibles (rugby union), the 1924–25 New Zealand team

== Other uses ==
- Les Invincibles, a French-Canadian TV series
- Invincibles, a 2025 Czech film
- Irish National Invincibles, a group of extremist Irish Republicans in the 1880s
- The Invincibles with Arbaaz Khan, an internet talk show hosted by Indian actor Arbaaz Khan

== See also ==
- Invincible (disambiguation)
- The Incredibles (disambiguation)
- The Invisibles (disambiguation)
- Chakra: The Invincible, a 2010 Indian animated superhero film
