= Invisible (disambiguation) =

Invisibility is the state of an object that cannot be seen.

Invisible(s) may also refer to:

== Music ==
=== Artists ===
- Invisible (band), an Argentine progressive rock band
- The Invisible (band), an English alternative rock band

=== Albums ===
- Invisible (Edyta album) (2002)
- Invisible (La Ley album) (1995)
- Invisible (Leeland album) (2016)
- Invisible (Nightingale album) (2004)
- Invisible (EP), by Paint It Black (2013)

=== Songs ===
- "Invisible" (Alison Moyet song) (1984)
- "Invisible" (Christina Grimmie song) (2017)
- "Invisible" (Duran Duran song) (2021)
- "Invisible" (D-Side song) (2003)
- "Invisible" (Hunter Hayes song) (2014)
- "Invisible" (Jaded Era song) (2003)
- "Invisible" (Linkin Park song) (2017)
- "Invisible" (Skylar Grey song) (2011)
- "Invisible" (U2 song) (2014)
- "Invisible" (Zara Larsson song), from the film Klaus (2019)
- "Invisible", by 5 Seconds of Summer from Sounds Good Feels Good (2015)
- "Invisible", by Anthrax from Sound of White Noise (1993)
- "Invisible", by Avail from One Wrench (2000)
- "Invisible", by Big Time Rush from Elevate (2011)
- "Invisible", by Bruce Hornsby from Levitate (2009)
- "Invisible", by Bucks Fizz from the 12" single of "I Hear Talk" (1984)
- "Invisible", by Dio from Holy Diver (1983)
- "Invisible", by Dream Evil from Evilized (2003)
- "Invisible", by Everclear from World of Noise (1993)
- "Invisible", by Fischerspooner from #1 (2001)
- "Invisible", by Gabrielle Aplin from Dear Happy (2020)
- "Invisible", by James LaBrie from Elements of Persuasion (2005)
- "Invisible", by Joe Morris from Symbolic Gesture (1994)
- "Invisible", by Joe Satriani from What Happens Next (2018)
- "Invisible", by Julian Lennon from Everything Changes (2011)
- "Invisible", by Juliana Hatfield from Whatever, My Love (2015)
- "Invisible", by Leyland from Invisible (2016)
- "Invisible", by Lillix from Falling Uphill (2003)
- "Invisible", by Living Colour from Shade (2017)
- "Invisible", by Man Overboard from Heavy Love (2015)
- "Invisible", by Moka Only from Lime Green (2001)
- "Invisible", by Monolake from A Bugged Out Mix (2006)
- "Invisible", by Ornette Coleman from Something Else!!!! (1958)
- "Invisible", by Pet Shop Boys from Elysium (2012)
- "Invisible", by Sadist from Sadist (2007)
- "Invisible", by Sugar Ray from Floored (1997)
- "Invisible", by Switchblade Symphony from The Three Calamities (1999)
- "Invisible", by Taylor Swift from Taylor Swift (2006)
- "Invisible", by Tilt (1999)

=== Other ===
- Invisible Records, a record label

== Books ==
- Invisible (Auster novel), a 2009 novel by Paul Auster
- Invisible (Hautman novel), a 2006 novel by Pete Hautman
- The Invisibles, a comic book by Grant Morrison
- Invisible (James Patterson novel), a 2014 James Patterson novel

== Film and television ==
=== Film ===
- Invisibles (2007 film), a Spanish documentary film directed by Mariano Barroso, Isabel Coixet, and Javier Corcuera
- Invisible (2011 film), a 2011 film
- Invisible (2015 film), a 2015 film
- Invisible (2017 film), a 2017 film
- Invisibles, a film featuring work by Wim Wenders
- Invisibles (2018 film), a French comedy-drama film directed by Louis-Julien Petit
- Invisibles (2025 film), an Italian film written and directed by Ambra Principato
- Les Invisibles (film), a 2012 film directed by Sébastien Lifshitz

=== TV ===
- Invisible (miniseries), a 2024 Spanish drama television series
- Unseen, a 2020 Belgian TV series directed by Geoffrey Enthoven, released in Belgium as Invisible
- "Invisible" (FBI: Most Wanted), a 2020 episode

== Other uses ==
- Los invisibles, a 1912 play by Gregorio de Laferrère

== See also ==
- Invincible (disambiguation)
