= INS Nistar =

INS Nistar is the name of the following ships of the Indian Navy:

- INS Nistar (1969), a submarine rescue vessel purchased from the Soviet Union, decommissioned in 1989
- INS Nistar, lead Nistar-class diving support vessel, launched in 2022
