= Invencible =

Invencible (Spanish for "invincible") may refer to:

- Invencible (Deny album), 2014
- Invencible, a 2011 album by Daniela Castillo, or the title song
- El Patrón: Invencible, or Invencible, a 2011 album by Tito El Bambino
- "Invencible", a song by Libído from Pop*Porn

== See also ==
- Invincible (disambiguation)
