= Diving Support Craft =

Vessels of the Indian Navy

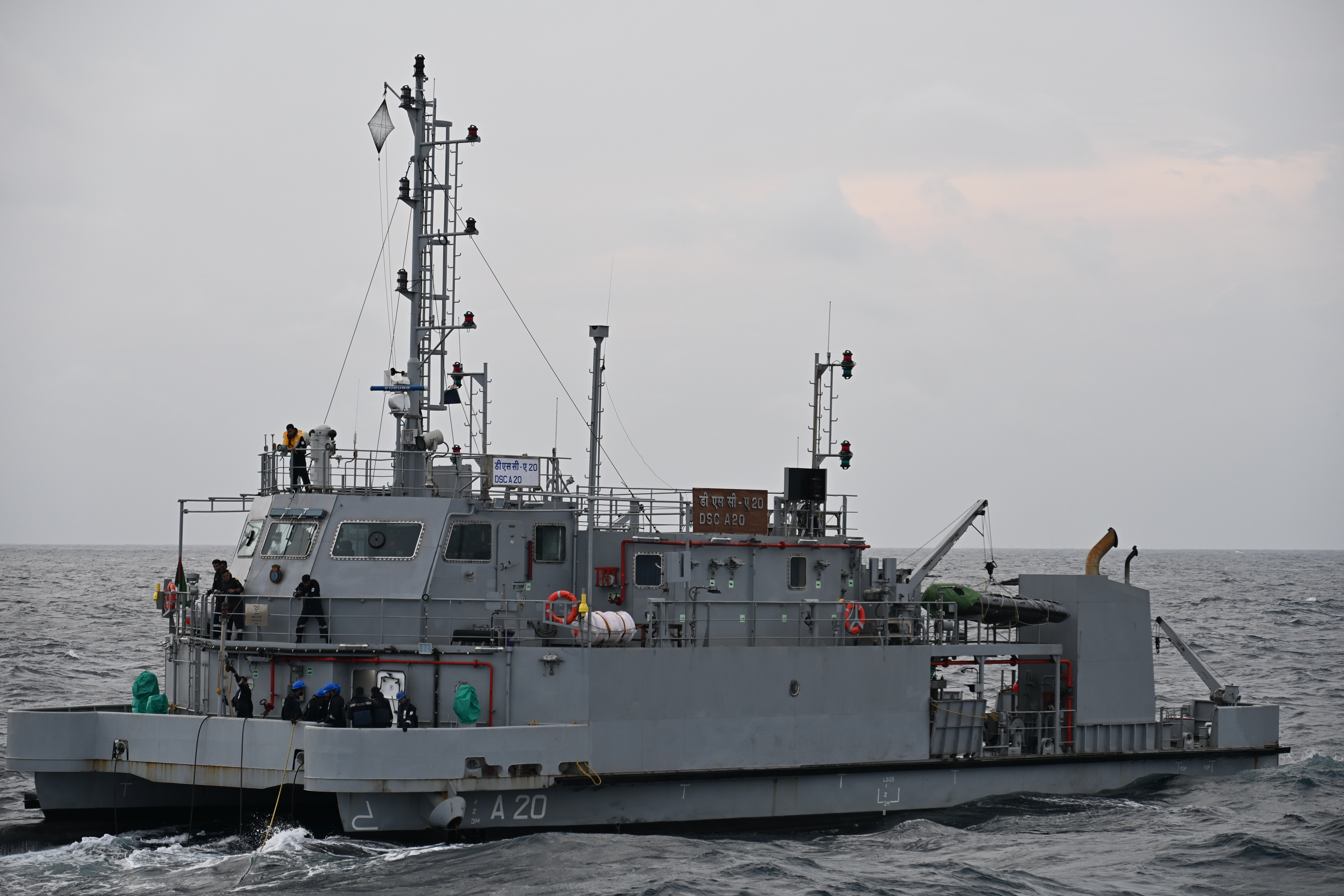
- DSC A20 at sea

Class overview
- Name: DSC class
- Builders: Titagarh Naval Systems
- Operators: Indian Navy
- Cost: ₹174.77 crore (equivalent to ₹214 crore or US$23 million in 2026) for five ships; ₹30 crore (equivalent to ₹33 crore or US$3.5 million in 2026) per ship (FY 2023)
- Building: 5
- Completed: 2
- Active: 1

General characteristics
- Type: Diving support craft
- Displacement: 390 t (380 long tons; 430 short tons)
- Length: 30 m (98 ft)
- Beam: 12 m (39 ft)
- Draught: <2.5 m (8 ft 2 in)
- Speed: 12 kn (22 km/h; 14 mph)
- Complement: Diving team
- Armament: 1 × 12.7 mm SRCG

Diving Support Craft (DSC) are a series of 5 small-category diving support vessels being built for the Indian Navy by Titagarh Rail Systems Limited.

== History ==
The ships are designed and equipped with state-of-the-art apparatus to support diving operations in coastal under water environment. The vessels are designed to meet the mission needs of Command Clearance Diving Teams (CCDTs). A contract worth ₹174.77 crore (equivalent to ₹214 crore or US$23 million in 2026) was signed between Titagarh Rail Systems Limited (TRSL) and the Indian Navy on 12 February 2021. Diving support vessels are important for both military and commercial diving. They are used for underwater work such as inspecting and maintaining pipelines, well-heads, and mobile platforms. They will be used for providing diving assistance to all ships inside and close to harbour for underwater repair, maintenance and salvage.

The ships have been indigenously designed and built in accordance with the naval rules and regulations of the Indian Register of Shipping (IRS), and the systems were tested at Naval Science and Technological Laboratory (NSTL) of DRDO. They are 30 m long catamaran hull ships, with a displacement of around 380 tons. The ships are designed with a two-man Re-Compression Chamber (RCC). About 70% of main and auxiliary equipment are sourced from indigenous contractors.

The first ship, DSC A20, was delivered on 18 September 2025. DSC A20 was commissioned on 16 December 2025 at Naval Base, Kochi which will also be its homeport under the Southern Naval Command. It was the 11th ship of the Navy commissioned in the year.

== Ships in the class ==
Pennant	Yard Number	Laid Down	Launched	Delivered	Commissioned	Homeport	Status
Indian Navy
A20	325	27 January 2022	31 August 2023	16 September 2025	16 December 2025	Kochi	Active
A21	326	5 May 2022	30 October 2023	20 November 2026		Mumbai	Launched
A22	327	12 August 2022	13 September 2025				Launched
A23	328	17 January 2023	19 April 2026				Launched
A24	329	31 August 2023	1 August 2026				Launched

== See also ==
- Future of the Indian Navy
- Nistar-class diving support vessel
