= Nistar-class diving support vessel =

Diving support vessels for the Indian Navy

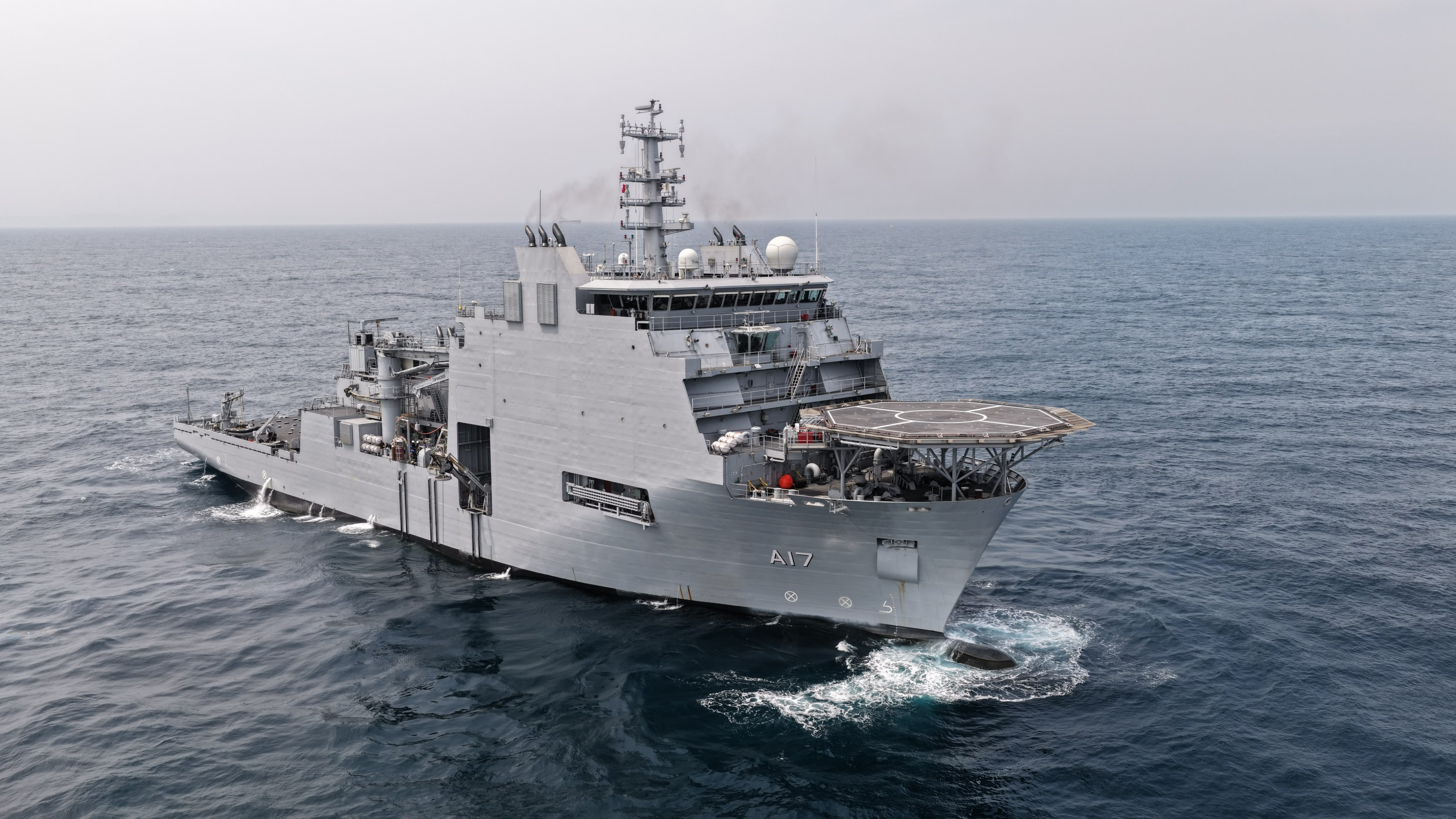
- Nipun at sea

Class overview
- Builders: Hindustan Shipyard (HSL)
- Operators: Indian Navy
- Cost: ₹2,392.94 crore (equivalent to ₹32 billion or US$330 million in 2023); ₹1,196.47 crore (equivalent to ₹16 billion or US$170 million in 2023) per unit (FY 2018)
- Planned: 2
- Completed: 2
- Active: 2

General characteristics
- Type: Diving support vessel
- Displacement: 9,350 t (9,202 long tons)
- Length: 118.4 m (388 ft 5 in)
- Beam: 22.8 m (74 ft 10 in)
- Propulsion: 2 × diesel engine
- Complement: 1 × Deep-submergence rescue vehicle
- Sensors & processing systems: Navigation radar; 2 × BEL Lynx-U2; 2 × EOIRST fire-control system for CIWS
- Electronic warfare & decoys: 1 × EW Suite
- Armament: 2 × 30 mm/65 AK-630 CIWS
- Aircraft carried: 1 × 15 t (15 long tons) helicopter.

The Nistar class is a series of two diving support vessels being built by Hindustan Shipyard (HSL) for the Indian Navy. The deal was signed on 20 September 2018 with the delivery of the ships is scheduled to commence from July 2023. The primary role of the vessels to support the Indian Navy's submarine fleet and meet various operational requirements such as submarine rescue, deep sea diving operations, sustained patrolling, non combatant evacuation operations and search and rescue (SAR). The induction of the vessels helps the Indian Navy to prioritize submarine operations in the Indo-Pacific.

== History ==
The Nistar-class project is a series of two diving support vessels being built to support Indian Navy's expanding submarine fleet. These ships will act as a mother ship to the recently acquired deep-submergence rescue vehicle (DSRV) for rescuing and aiding submarines in need. In December 2017, Hindustan Shipyard (HSL) won a bid to build two ships for ₹2,019 crore (equivalent to ₹28 billion or US$290 million in 2023). The Indian Navy signed a contract with the HSL to indigenously design, develop and manufacture these ships on 20 September 2018. Initially, the displacement of the vessel was limited to 7,650 t (7,529 long tons) which later increased to 9,350 t (9,202 long tons).

The deal that was signed in September 2018 had a value of ₹2,392.94 crore (equivalent to ₹32 billion or US$330 million in 2023). The aim was to deliver the first vessel within 36 months of signing the deal. However, there was considerable delay due to the COVID-19 pandemic with the launching of the ships done in September 2022 and the first delivery expected in July 2023, this tantamount to a delay of two years.

The project was awarded to HSL on a nomination basis to improve the financial standing of the shipyard. HSL began construction activities for the project in 2019.

=== Namesake ===
The first ship is named after INS Nistar, a submarine rescue ship, which was acquired from the erstwhile Soviet Navy in 1969 and had served until 1989. From then onwards, until the commissioning of this class of diving support vessels, the Indian Navy relied on commercially-leased vessels, like SCI Sabarmati, to accomplish these roles.

The second ship is named Nipun, which is a Sanskrit word meaning "adept", "capable", and "well versed" in a particular discipline.

== Design ==
The ships will have a displacement of 9,350 t (9,202 long tons) which has considerably increased from the contracted weight of 7,650 t (7,529 long tons). The reason for the substantial increase in weight has not been disclosed but it can be corroborated to increased role of the ship. The length of 118.4 metres (388 ft 5 in) and a beam of 22.8 m (74 ft 10 in). The ships have an endurance of 60 days without replenishment. The diving support vessels (DSVs) are first of the kind ship, indigenously designed and built at Indian shipyard for the Indian Navy.

The ships have been designed by HSL with design consultancy from Vik-Sandvik design similar to the INS Dhruv, another specialty ship manufactured by HSL. The ship have been designed and constructed in accordance with Classification Rules of the Indian Register of Shipping (IRS).

These ships will be able to perform carry out submarine rescue, deep sea diving operations along with search and rescue missions, sustained patrolling and helicopter operations at the sea.

The ships will be fitted with Dynamic Positioning System (DP-II) to automatically maintain its position and heading during underwater operations in harsh conditions. Other equipment also includes a six-person Decompression Chamber; a Submersible Decompression Chamber (SDC), or Diving Bell, which is launched through a moon pool for diver safety; and a Self-Propelled Hyperbaric Lifeboat (SPHL). The vessels will act as mother ships for two Observation-class Remotely Operated Vehicles (OROVs) and a Deep Submergence Rescue Vehicle (DSRV) and will be equipped with a helipad. The ships also feature with side-scan sonar and a 15-tonne subsea crane.

== Construction ==
HSL started the construction activities months after signing the deal. The beleaguered shipyard won this project on a nomination basis to bolster its financial position. The first ship (Yard-11190) was laid down on 28 December 2019, a year after signing the deal whilst the keel of the second ship (Yard-11191) was laid down three months later on 23 March 2020.

The contract obligated the shipyard to deliver the ships within 36 months from signing the deal but there has been considerably delays owing to the COVID-19 pandemic and subsequent lock down in India. Both the ships were concurrently launched on 22 September 2022.

A minimum delay of a year was expected with the first ship, which is expected to be delivered in July 2023 while the second ship will be delivered six months later, around January 2024. Owing to this delay, the Indian Navy has released a Request for Information (RFI) to lease a mother ship to operate their deep-submergence rescue vehicle (DSRV).

The ship will have at least 80% indigenous content contributing significantly to the Atmanirbhar Bharat mission of the Government of India and further bolstered the Indian economy. In addition, the steel used in their construction has been wholly manufactured by SAIL.

As of December 2022, 46% of the physical construction has been complete on both the ships with deliveries expected to be completed by 2024.

On 27 May 2024, Nistar completed its maiden sea trials. The trials included assessment of the ship's maneuverability, propulsion systems, and onboard equipment. Between 24 March and 12 April 2025, the air/mix gas diving system trials of the ship was completed which included unmanned and manned dives at varying depths as well as trials of its Observation-class Remotely Operated Vehicle (OROV). This will be followed by "saturation diving trials".

HSL delivered INS Nistar, with an indigenous content of 80%, to Indian Navy on 8 July 2025. The ship, nicknamed as "Guardian of the Deep", was commissioned into the Eastern Naval Command on 18 July 2025.

The second vessel, Nipun, was delivered to the Indian Navy on 30 July 2026 at Visakhapatnam.

== Service history ==
=== INS Nistar ===
On 14 September 2025, INS Nistar made her maiden port call at Changi Naval Base, Singapore to participate in Exercise Pacific Reach 2025 (XPR 25) which would start on the next day. The mothership would deploy the Submarine Rescue Unit (East) for the biennial exercise which would be hosted in the South China Sea. The exercise included a harbour phase, between 15 and 20 September, where the Indian Navy presented their DSRV philosophy and post-rescue medical preparedness through an international medical symposium.

This was followed by a sea phase from 21 to 25 September. During this phase, two other rescue units were also embarked on MV Swift Rescue of the Republic of Singapore Navy (RSN) and JS Chiyoda of the Japan Maritime Self-Defense Force (JMSDF). The three rescue units and their submarine rescue ships operated along with submarines of Republic of Korea Navy, RSN and JMSDF which simulated as Disabled Submarines (DISSUBs). On 23 and 24 September, the DSRV Tiger X was deployed from Nistar to rescue ROKS Shin Dol-seok (SS-082) and RSS Invincible, respectively. Overall, the DSRV conducted mating exercise with three foreign submarines on three consecutive days also marking the Navy's first such exercise. The exercise included ROV operations for over three days. The deployment the Navy's interoperability with foreign maritime forces. On 25 September, a coordinated rescue drill was hosted by RSN. This was the first "three-asset rescue (R3)" in the history of Pacific Reach. Nistar led the formation, assisting the other rescue ships by localising and surveying the datum and passing requisite information to Swift Rescue and Chiyoda. While Invincible simulated as the DISSUB, India's ROV and DSRV were deployed and the mating was completed within an hour.

She also participated at the International Fleet Review 2026 held at Visakhapatnam. As part of the Harbour Phase, on 19 February 2026, the Indian Navy demonstrated the capabilities of the ship and the DSRV to the naval delegates of friendly foreign countries.

== Ships of the class ==
Name	Pennant	Yard No	Keel laid	Launched	Delivered	Commissioned	Home-port	Status
Indian Navy
Nistar	A16	11190	28 December 2019	22 September 2022	8 July 2025	18 July 2025	Visakhapatnam	Active
Nipun	A17	11191	23 March 2020	22 September 2022	30 July 2026	31 August 2026	Mumbai	Active

== Gallery ==
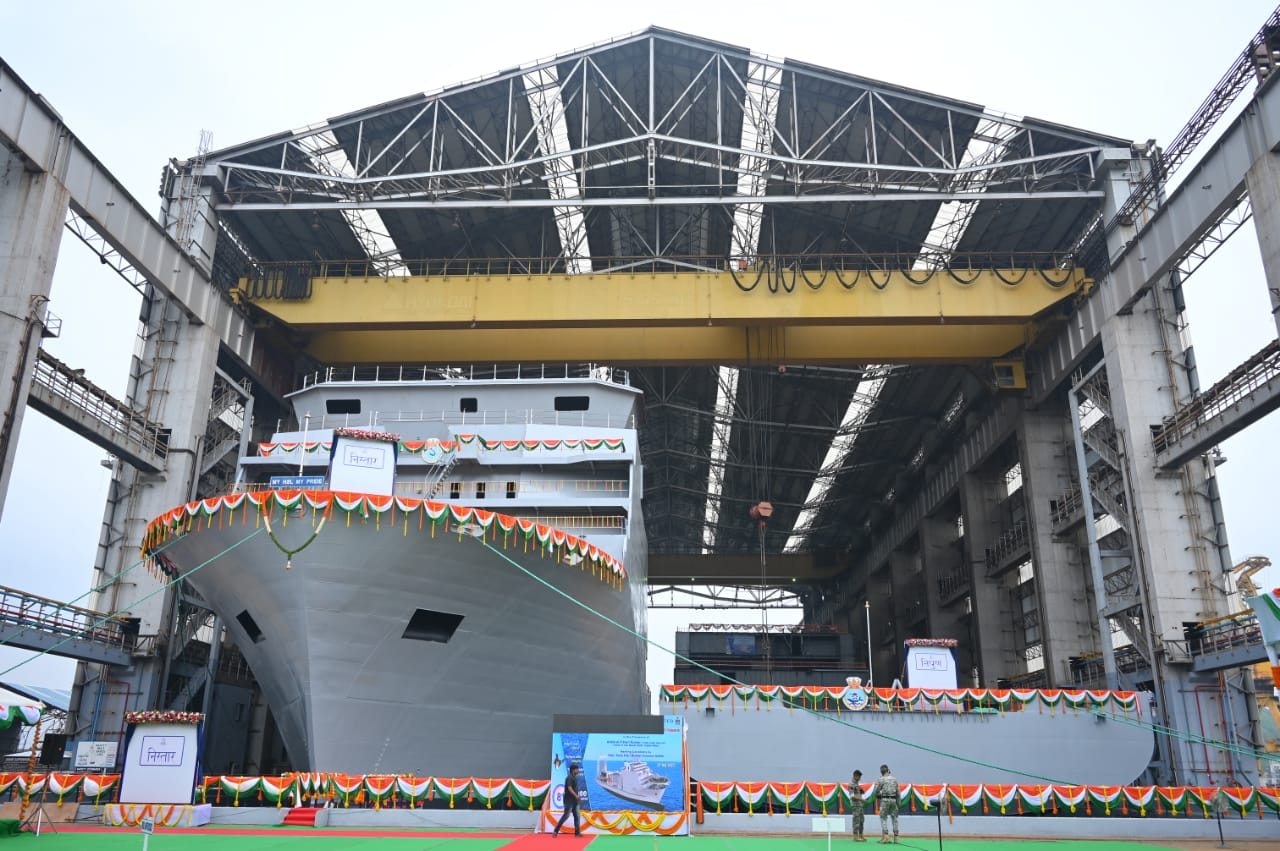
Nistar and Nipun diving support vessels launched at HSL.

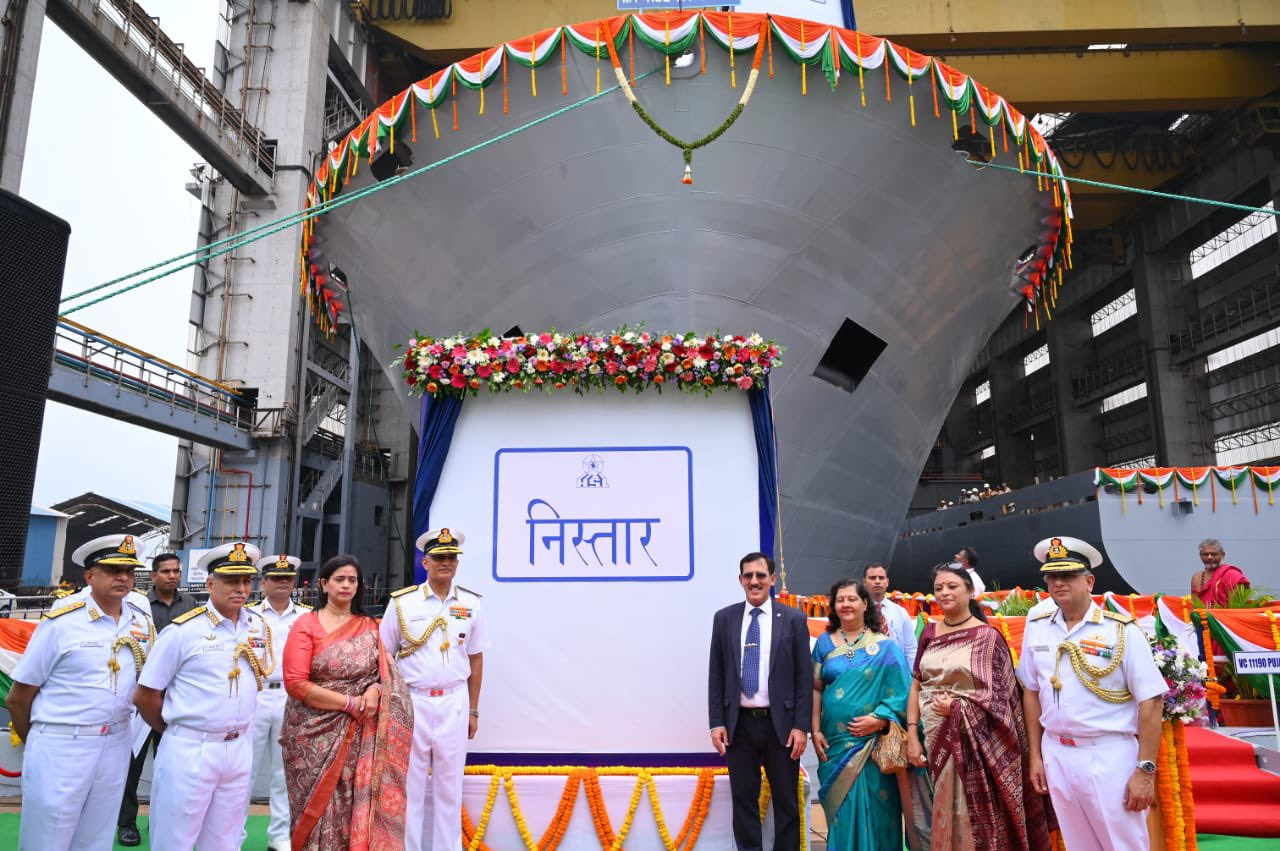
Launch ceremony of Nistar and Nipun at Hindustan shipyard.

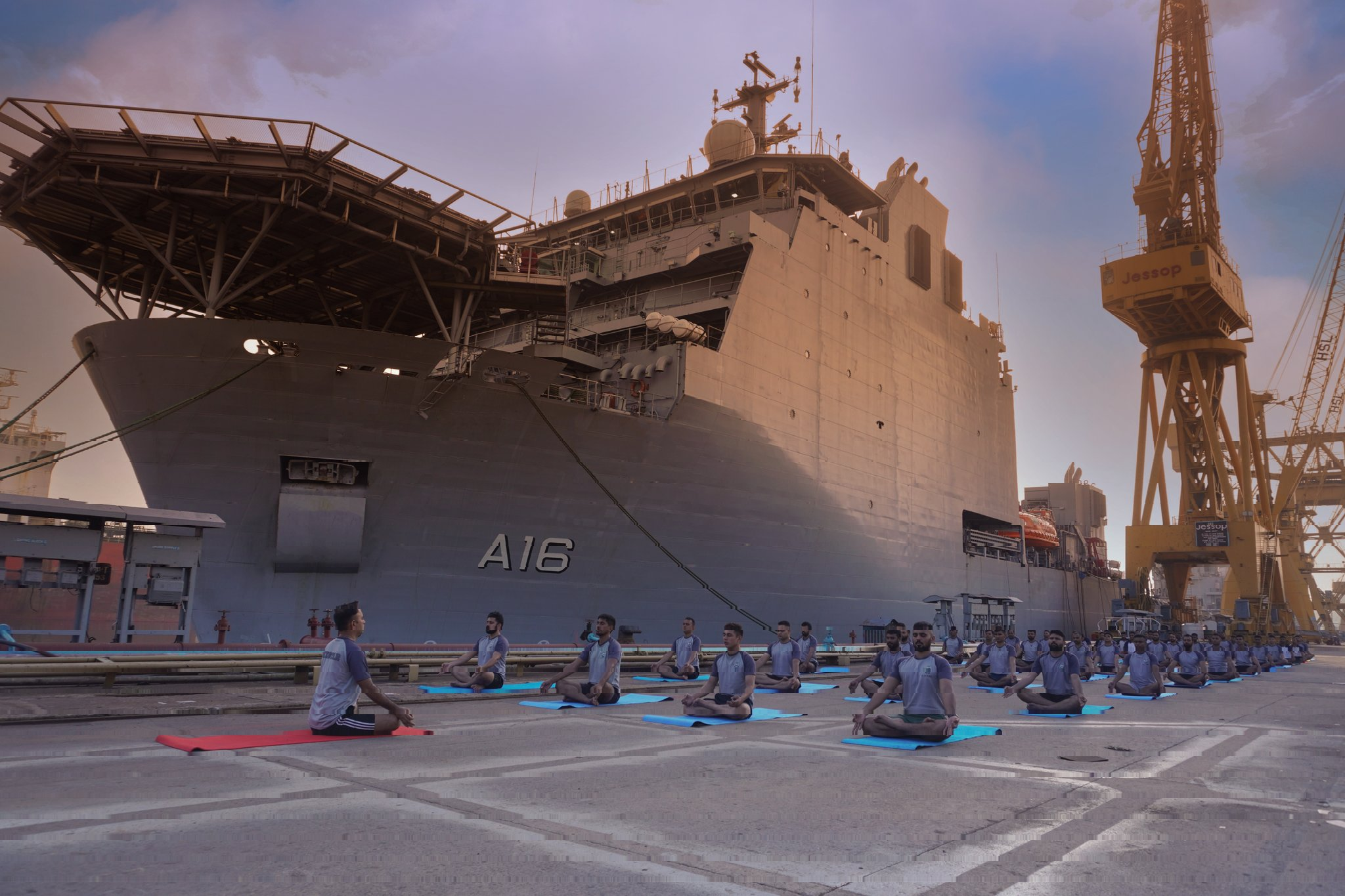
Nistar (A16), diving support vesssel during Yoga day practise.

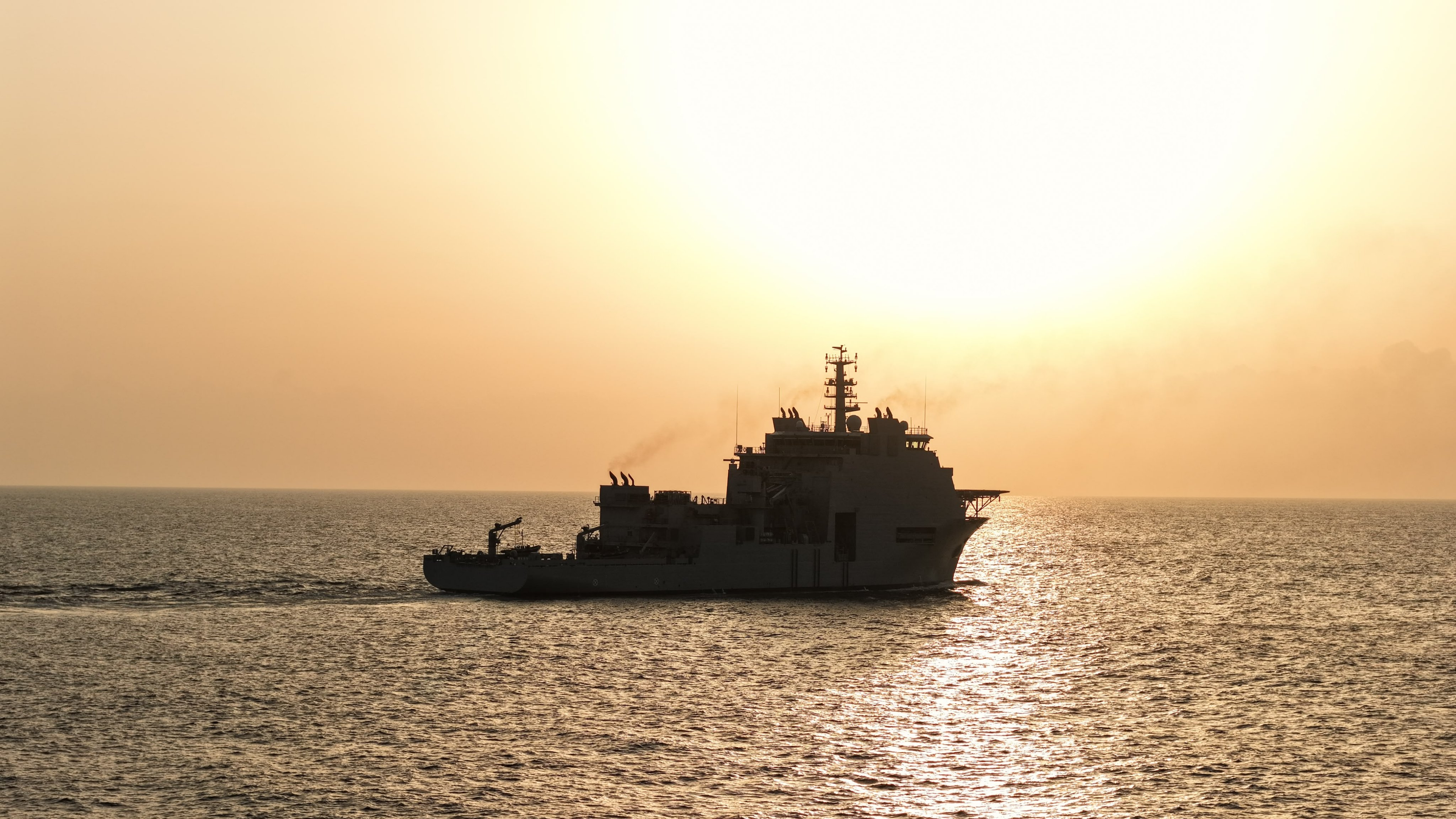
Nipun (A17) during sea trials.

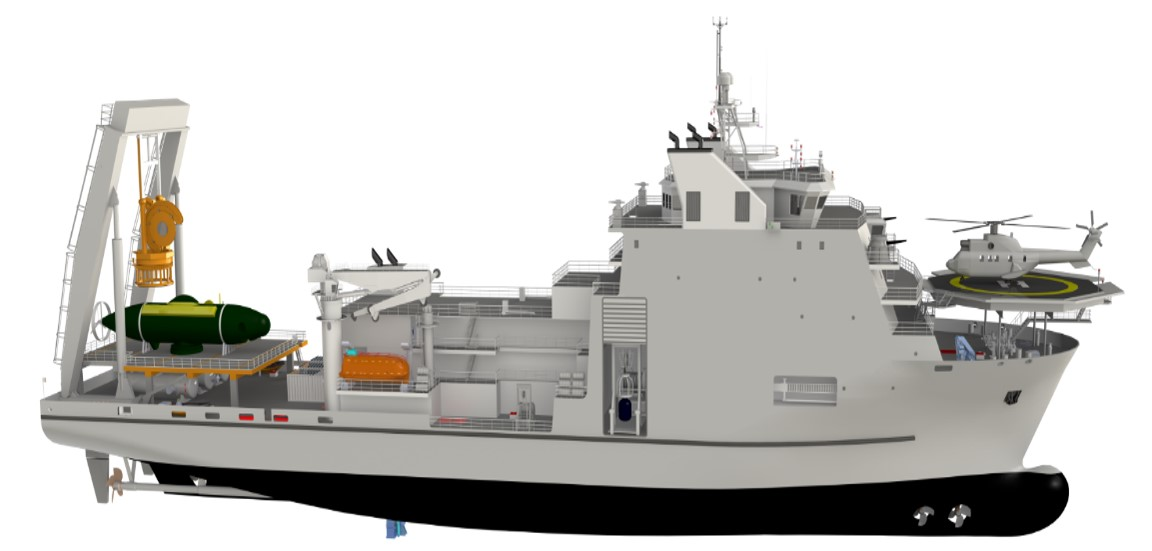
Model of diving support vessels being built at Hindustan shipyard.

== See also ==
- List of active Indian Navy ships
- Future of the Indian Navy
- Diving support craft (Indian navy)
