= The Incredibles (disambiguation) =

The Incredibles is a 2004 American animated superhero film.

The Incredibles may also refer to:

- The Incredibles (franchise), a film franchise created by Pixar Animation Studios
  - The Incredibles (soundtrack)
  - The Incredibles (video game)
  - Incredibles 2, the 2018 sequel to the first film
- "The Incredibles", the team of Boeing employees that developed the initial Boeing 747
- The Incredibles, nickname of the Rhodesian Light Infantry
- HTC Droid Incredible, an Android smart phone
  - HTC Incredible S, the follow-up smart phone to Droid Incredible, also known as Incredible 2
  - Droid Incredible 4G LTE, also known as Incredible 3

== See also ==
- The Invincibles (disambiguation)
- The Invisibles (disambiguation)
