= MV Swift Rescue =

Submarine support and rescue vessel

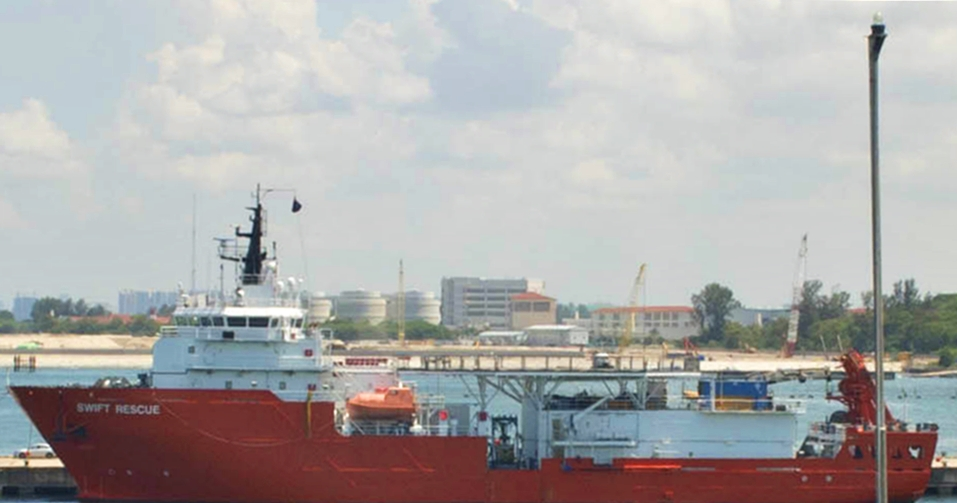
- MV Swift Rescue within Changi Naval Base

History

Singapore
- Name: MV Swift Rescue
- Owner: First Response Marine
- Operator: Republic of Singapore Navy
- Builder: ST Marine
- Laid down: 1 April 2008
- Launched: 29 November 2008
- Completed: 30 April 2009
- Identification: IMO : 9536519; MMSI : 564314000; Call Sign : 9V7855
- Status: Active

General characteristics
- Tonnage: 4,290 gross
- Length: 85 m (278 ft 10 in)
- Draught: 4.3 m (14 ft 1 in)
- Propulsion: 2 × MAN 2040kW diesel 3 x Caterpillar 1,360kW diesel 2 x CPP Kort nozzle propellers 1 x 95kW emergency generator
- Speed: 12 knots (22 km/h; 14 mph)
- Range: 7,500 nmi (13,900 km; 8,600 mi)
- Endurance: 28 days
- Boats & landing craft carried: 1 x Submarine Rescue Vehicle
- Complement: 27 crews
- Aviation facilities: Helicopter landing platform

MV Swift Rescue is a submarine support and rescue vessel (SSRV) that is operated by the Republic of Singapore Navy (RSN). The ship is stationed in Changi Naval Base and has a mixed crew of 27 personnel from the RSN and Swire Pacific Offshore Operations Pte Ltd, the marine arm of Swire Group.

In January 2007, the RSN awarded a design, build, own and operate contract to ST Marine, a subsidiary of ST Engineering.

== Rescue missions ==
Swift Rescue participated in the ongoing triennial submarine rescue exercise in the region, Exercise Pacific Reach which involves regional partners such as the United States Navy, Japan Maritime Self-Defense Force, Royal Australian Navy and Republic of Korea Navy. The exercise is primarily meant to build interoperability within the region for submarine rescue capabilities as well as building relations between regional submarine operators and rescue assets.

Swift Rescue was also activated on 29 December 2014 to aid in the search and rescue of Indonesia AirAsia Flight 8501 after the Indonesian Search and Rescue Agency accepted the offer of help from the Singapore authorities. On 14 January 2015, the vessel found the wreckage of the lost airliner at the bottom of the Java Sea.

Swift Rescue partook in its first submarine search mission after the Indonesian Navy submarine KRI Nanggala went missing off the waters of Bali during a torpedo drill on 21 April 2021. Its ROV captured photos of the sunken boat at a depth of 838 metres on 25 April.

Swift Rescue participated in Exercise Pacific Reach 2025 (XPR 25), a biennial exercise hosted by the Republic of Singapore Navy (RSN). The exercise included a harbour phase, between 15 and 20 September, at Changi Naval Base and was followed by a sea phase from 21 to 25 September in the South China Sea. This phase saw the participation of two other rescue units embarked on their respective submarine rescue ships, INS Nistar and JS Chiyoda of the Indian Navy (IN) and the Japan Maritime Self-Defense Force (JMSDF) along with the submarines of Republic of Korea Navy, RSN and JMSDF which simulated as Disabled Submarines (DISSUBs). The DISSUBs included ROKS Shin Dol-seok (SS-082) and RSS Invincible. On 25 September, a coordinated rescue drill was hosted by RSN. This was a "three-asset rescue (R3)", the first-of-its-kind in the history of Pacific Reach. Nistar led the formation, assisting the other rescue ships by localising and surveying the datum and then passing requisite information to Swift Rescue and Chiyoda. While Invincible simulated as the DISSUB, India's ROV and DSRV Tiger X, part of the Submarine Rescue Unit (East), were deployed and the mating was completed within an hour.
