= JS Chiyoda (2016) =

Submarine rescue ship

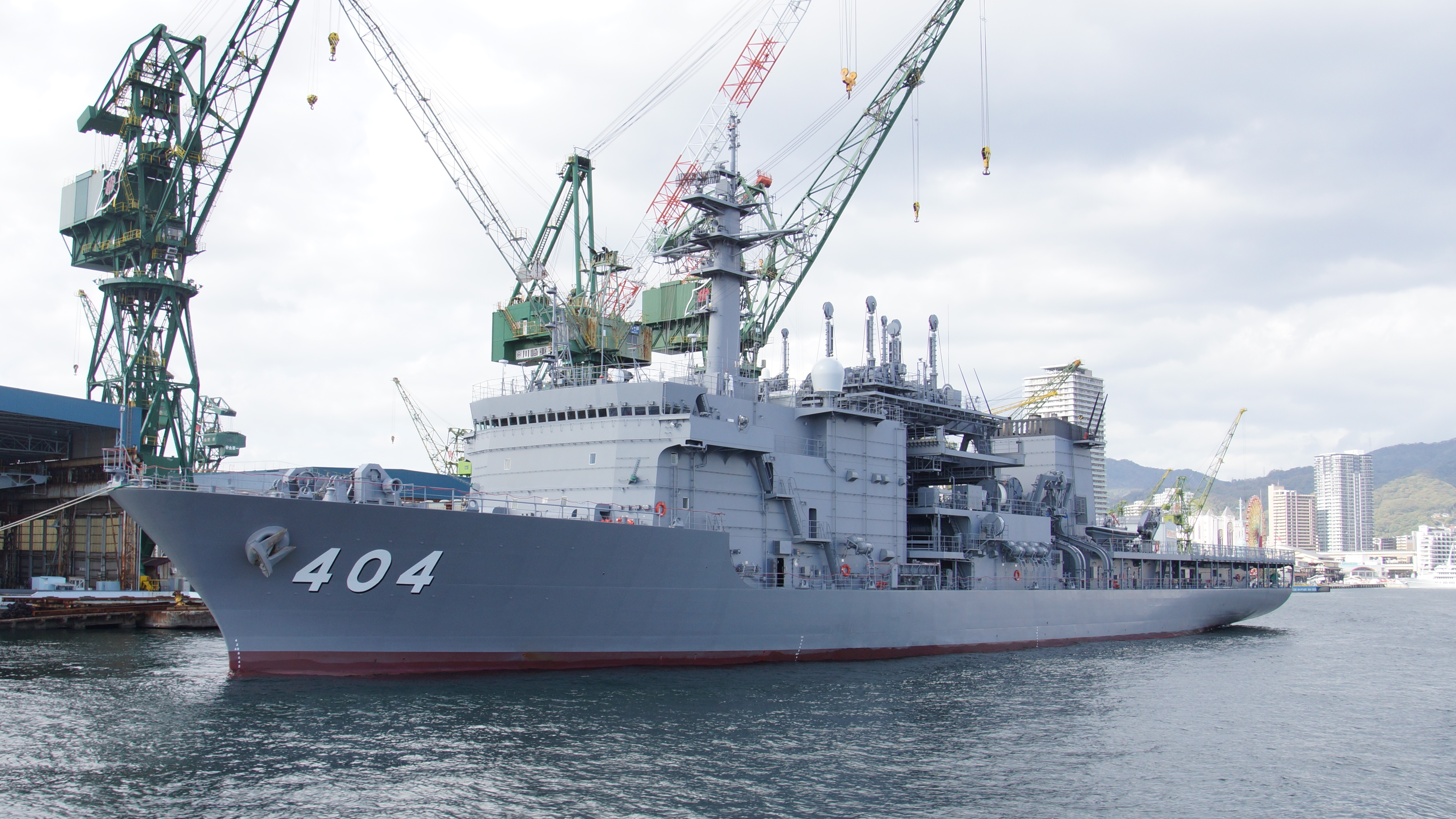
- JS Chiyoda at Kobe on 11 November 2017

History

Japan
- Name: Chiyoda; (ちよだ)
- Namesake: Chiyoda
- Ordered: 2014
- Builder: Mitsui, Tamano
- Laid down: 13 October 2015
- Launched: 17 October 2016
- Commissioned: 20 March 2018
- Home port: Yokosuka
- Identification: MMSI number: 431999603; Callsign: JSPV; Pennant number: ASR-404
- Status: Active

Class overview
- Preceded by: Chihaya class (1998)
- Succeeded by: N/A

General characteristics
- Type: Submarine rescue ship
- Displacement: 5,600–7,100 long tons (5,690–7,214 t) full load
- Length: 128.0 m (419 ft 11 in)
- Beam: 20.0 m (65 ft 7 in)
- Draught: 9.0 m (29 ft 6 in)
- Depth: 5.1 m (16 ft 9 in)
- Propulsion: 2 × diesel engines (16,000 hp, 12,000 kW); 2 x shafts
- Speed: 20 knots (37 km/h; 23 mph)
- Range: 6,000 nmi (11,000 km; 6,900 mi) at 13 kn (24 km/h; 15 mph)
- Boats & landing craft carried: 1 x deep-submergence rescue vehicle (DSRV); 1 x 11 m (36 ft) boats; 1 x unmanned underwater vehicle (ROV); 1 x deep sea submersible (DDS)
- Complement: 125
- Sensors & processing systems: Atmospheric pressure diving device; Automatic ship position holding device (DPS); Diving rescue device (DSRS)
- Aviation facilities: Helipad

JS Chiyoda (ASR-404) is a submarine rescue ship of Japan Maritime Self-Defense Force.

== Development and design ==
Chiyoda was built as a replacement for the older dilapidated submarine rescue ship with the same name, the JS Chiyoda (AS 405). In terms of design, it is said to be an expanded version of the later, more modern submarine rescue ship JS Chihaya (ASR 403).

The appearance is almost the same as Chihaya, but the mast has been changed to a tower shape. Both the installed DSRV and ROV are new, and the number of people that can be rescued by one dive has been increased from 12 to 16 on the Chihaya-equipped boat, and the submersible's battery has been changed from a silver/zinc compound secondary battery to a lithium-ion secondary battery. We changed it to shorten the charging time. ROVs have significantly better mobility and search ability than previous equipment, making it possible to accurately check the status of distressed submarines, improving on something that DSRVs have traditionally done.

Like the older Chiyoda and Chihaya, the ship has a Deep Submergence Rescue Vehicle (DSRV) to rescue the crew of the submarine, as well as a new Remotely Operated Vehicle (ROV). It will also be equipped with a complete set of submersible rescue devices (DSRS) and include unmanned underwater vehicles (ROV). The ship is equipped with three recompression (hyperbaric) chambers available for diving disease treatment for post-rescue response.

However, the suite of submarine tender functions, such as: refueling submarines, extra torpedoes, stores, spare parts and fresh water plus accommodation and rest facilities for the submarine's crew, which were built into the older Chiyoda, were omitted.

In addition, in the event of a large-scale disaster, it will be used as a base for medical support, livelihood support for disaster victims, and bathing support. Like Chiyoda (56AS) and Chihaya (08ASR), its capabilities will be further strengthened. Two surgical beds and about 10 beds are installed for this purpose.

The main engine is the same diesel as Chihaya, but the fuel tank has been enlarged to have a sufficient cruising range even at high speeds, and it has become possible to reach destinations such as rescue areas quickly.

== Construction and career ==
Chiyoda was laid down on 13 October 2015 at Mitsui Engineering and Shipbuilding, Tamano and launched on 17 October 2016. The vessel was commissioned on 20 March 2018.

After 15:00 on 1 May 2018, five men and women fell from a pleasure boat sailing in the vicinity while anchoring off the coast of Ito Port in Shizuoka Prefecture for a temporary stay for individual ship training in the north of Hatsushima, Sagami Bay. The crew visually recognized it, and to rescue the drowning man, they lowered the work boat from the ship and carried out rescue and rescue activities. On June 14, the same year, Japan-US hygiene joint training was conducted with the Self-Defense Forces Yokosuka Hospital, Yokosuka US Navy Hospital, and the US Navy Mercy-class hospital ship USNS Mercy.

Before dawn on 26 May 2019, two cargo ships collided at sea about 11 km south of Inubosaki in Choshi City, Chiba Prefecture. The captain, who was rescued about two hours after the sinking of the Chikatsu Maru (5-seater, 499 tons) owned by Katsumaru Kaiun in Imabari City, Ehime Prefecture, said, "Everyone was on board when the collision occurred." One was found on board the ship on the 26th and was confirmed dead, but a sound was heard in the second Japan Coast Guard diver's investigation from around 0:30 pm on the 27th, and even after five dives in the room. I confirmed the sound near a certain stern. When a diver hits the hull with a plastic hammer three to four times, a slight tapping sound is heard after a few seconds, and the missing person may be in a place where air remains on the ship. The person was rescued soon after.

From October 16 to December 7 of the same year, Chiyoda was dispatched to participate in the 8th Western Pacific Submarine Rescue Training (Pacific Reach 2019) sponsored by the Royal Australian Navy. The training was conducted from November 4 to November 15 in the waters west of Perth, Australia, and the participating countries were the United States, the Australian Federation, the Republic of Korea, the Republic of Singapore, Malaysia and 20 observer participating countries in addition to Japan. The Exercise included: submarine rescue training, search and rescue demonstrations for distressed submarines, etc.

Chiyoda participated in Exercise Pacific Reach 2025 (XPR 25), a biennial exercise hosted by the Republic of Singapore Navy (RSN). The exercise included a harbour phase, between 15 and 20 September, at Changi Naval Base, Singapore and was followed by a sea phase from 21 to 25 September in the South China Sea. This phase saw the participation of two other rescue units embarked on their respective submarine rescue ships, INS Nistar and MV Swift Rescue of the Indian Navy (IN) and the RSN along with the submarines of Republic of Korea Navy, RSN and Japan Maritime Self-Defense Force (JMSDF) which simulated as Disabled Submarines (DISSUBs). The DISSUBs included ROKS Shin Dol-seok (SS-082) and RSS Invincible. On 25 September, a coordinated rescue drill was hosted by RSN. This was a "three-asset rescue (R3)", the first-of-its-kind in the history of Pacific Reach. Nistar led the formation, assisting the other rescue ships by localising and surveying the datum and then passing requisite information to Swift Rescue and Chiyoda. While Invincible simulated as the DISSUB, India's ROV and DSRV Tiger X, part of the Submarine Rescue Unit (East), were deployed and the mating was completed within an hour.

== Gallery ==
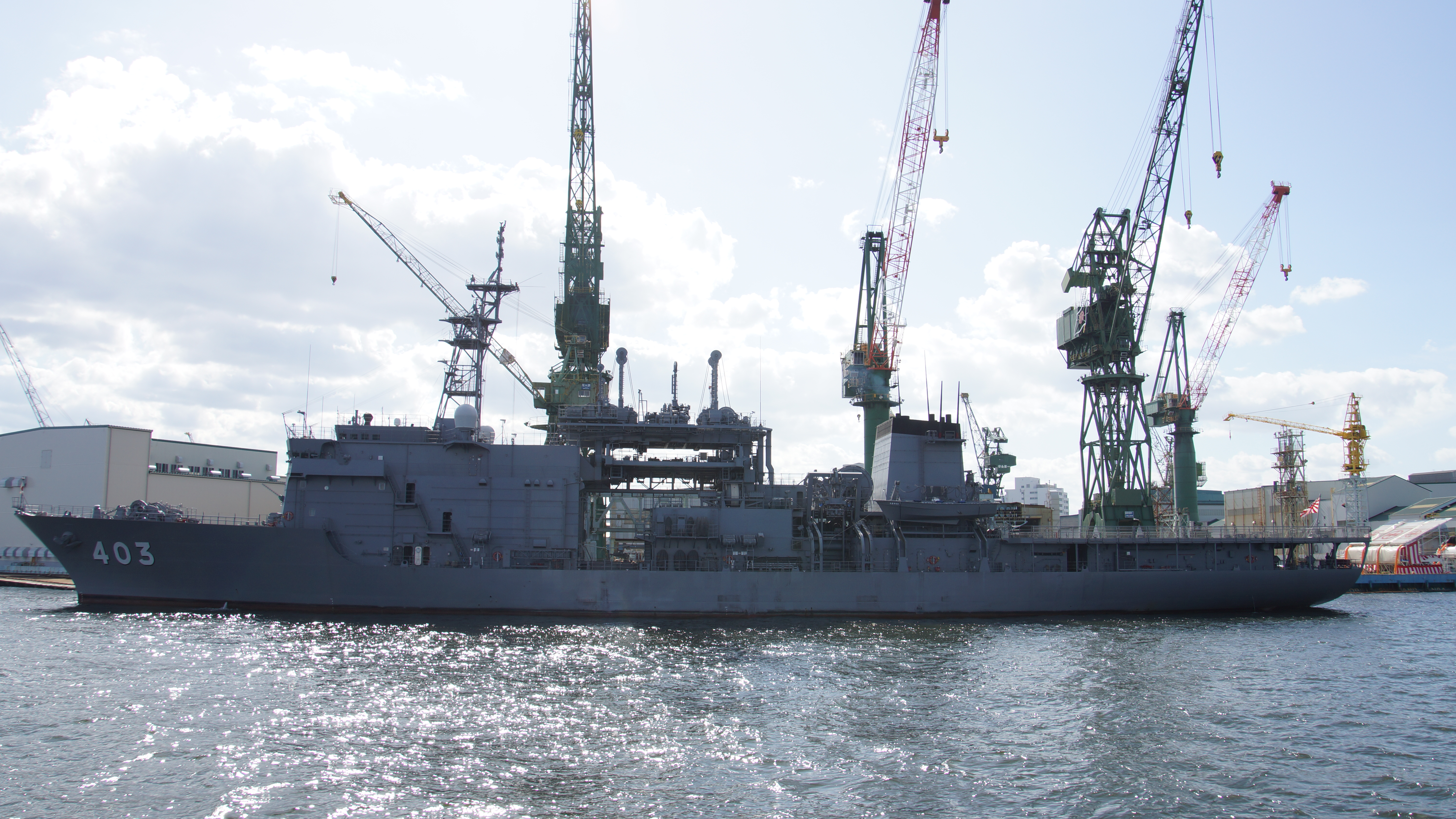
JS Chiyoda at Kobe on 2 September 2017.

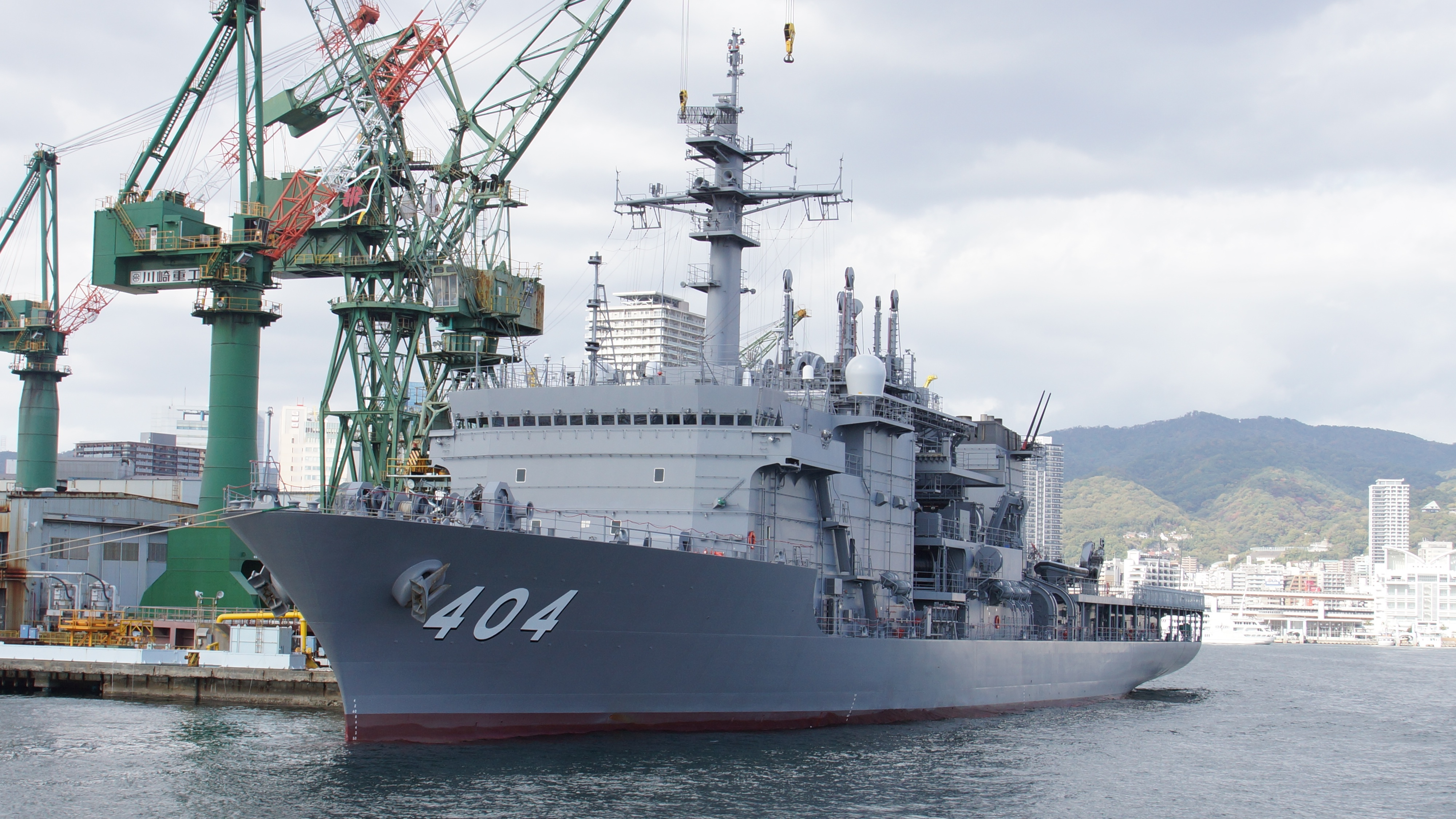
JS Chiyoda at Kobe on 11 November 2017.

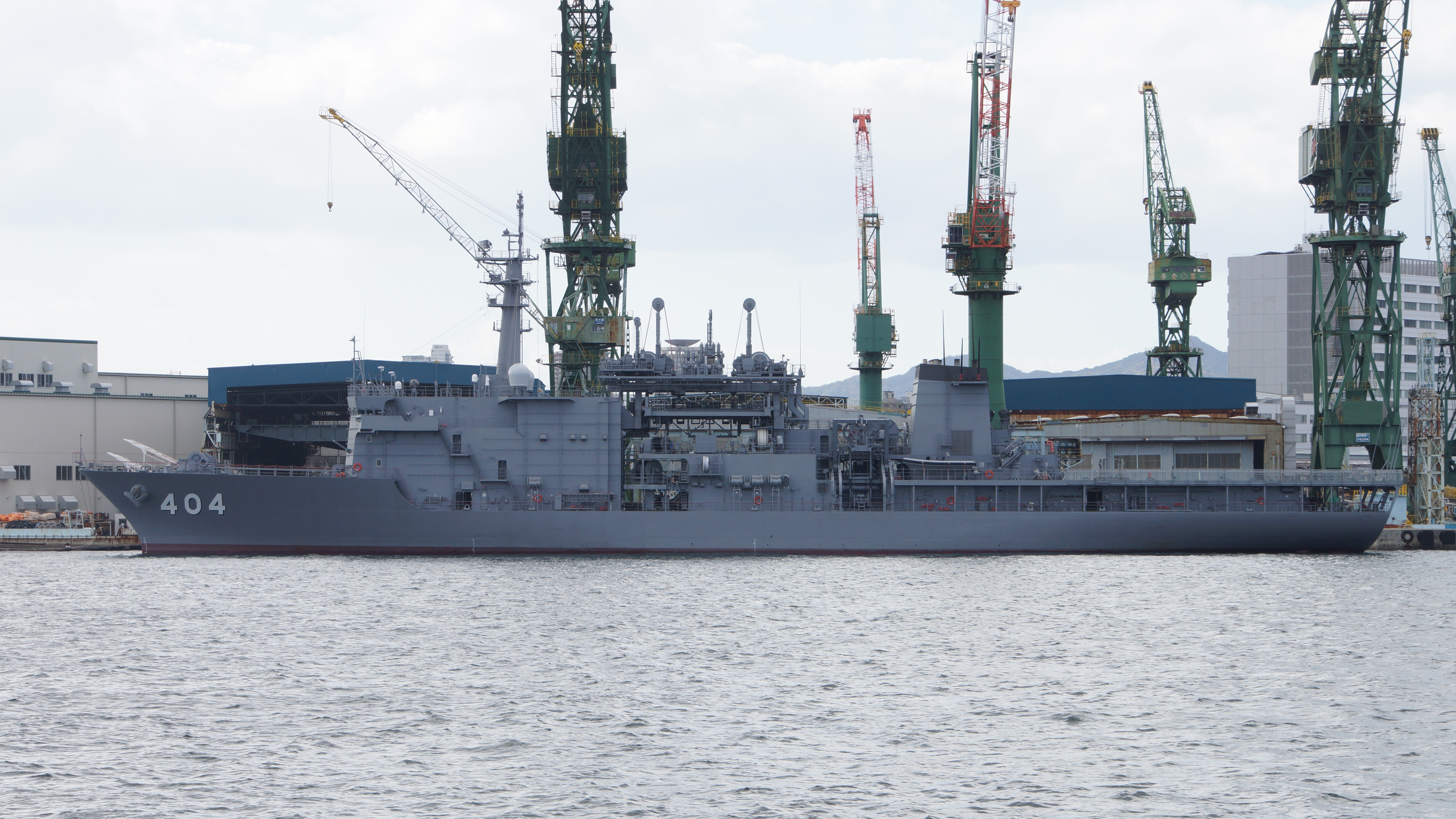
JS Chiyoda at Kobe on 11 November 2017.

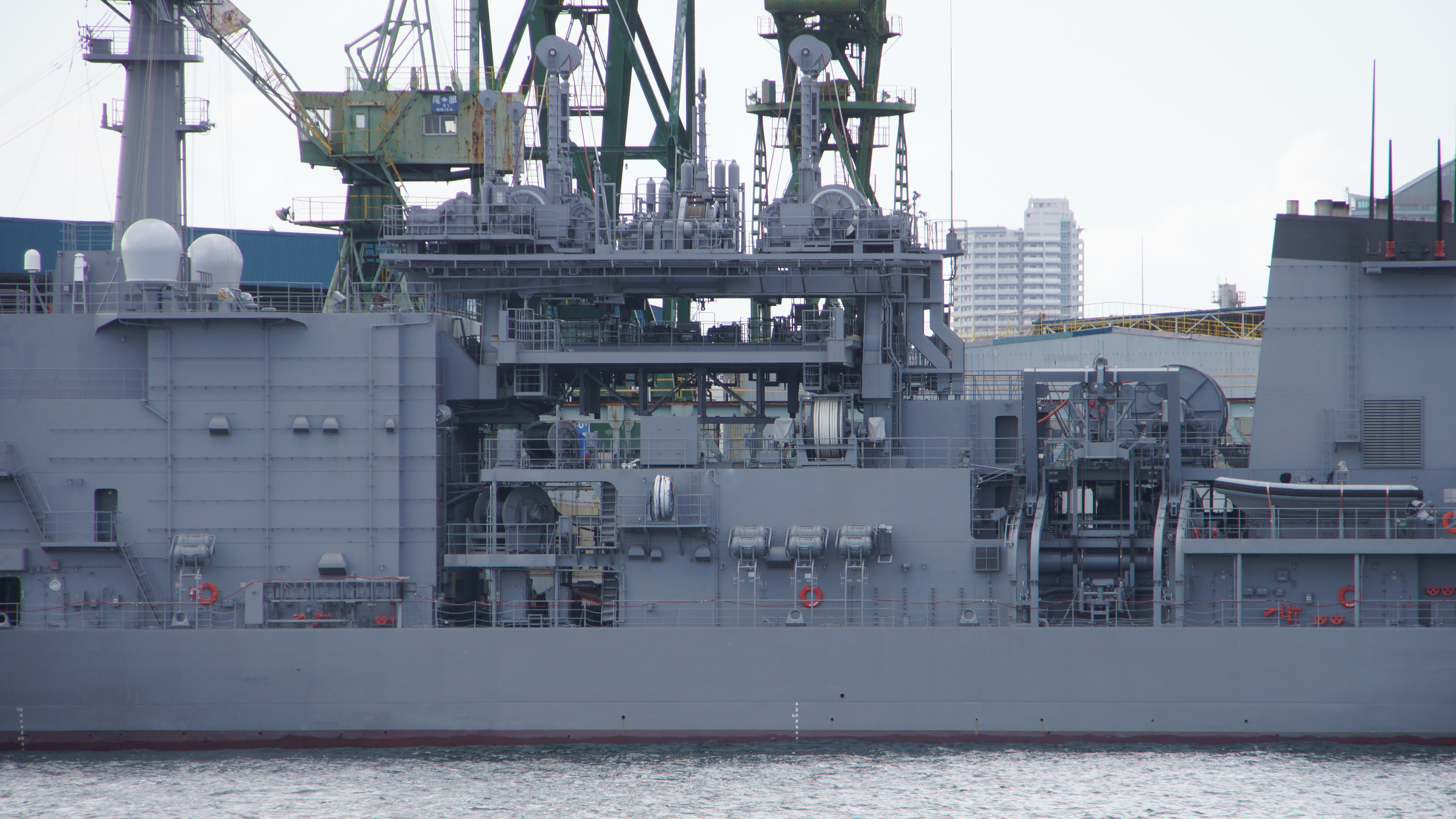
JS Chiyoda at Kobe on 11 November 2017.

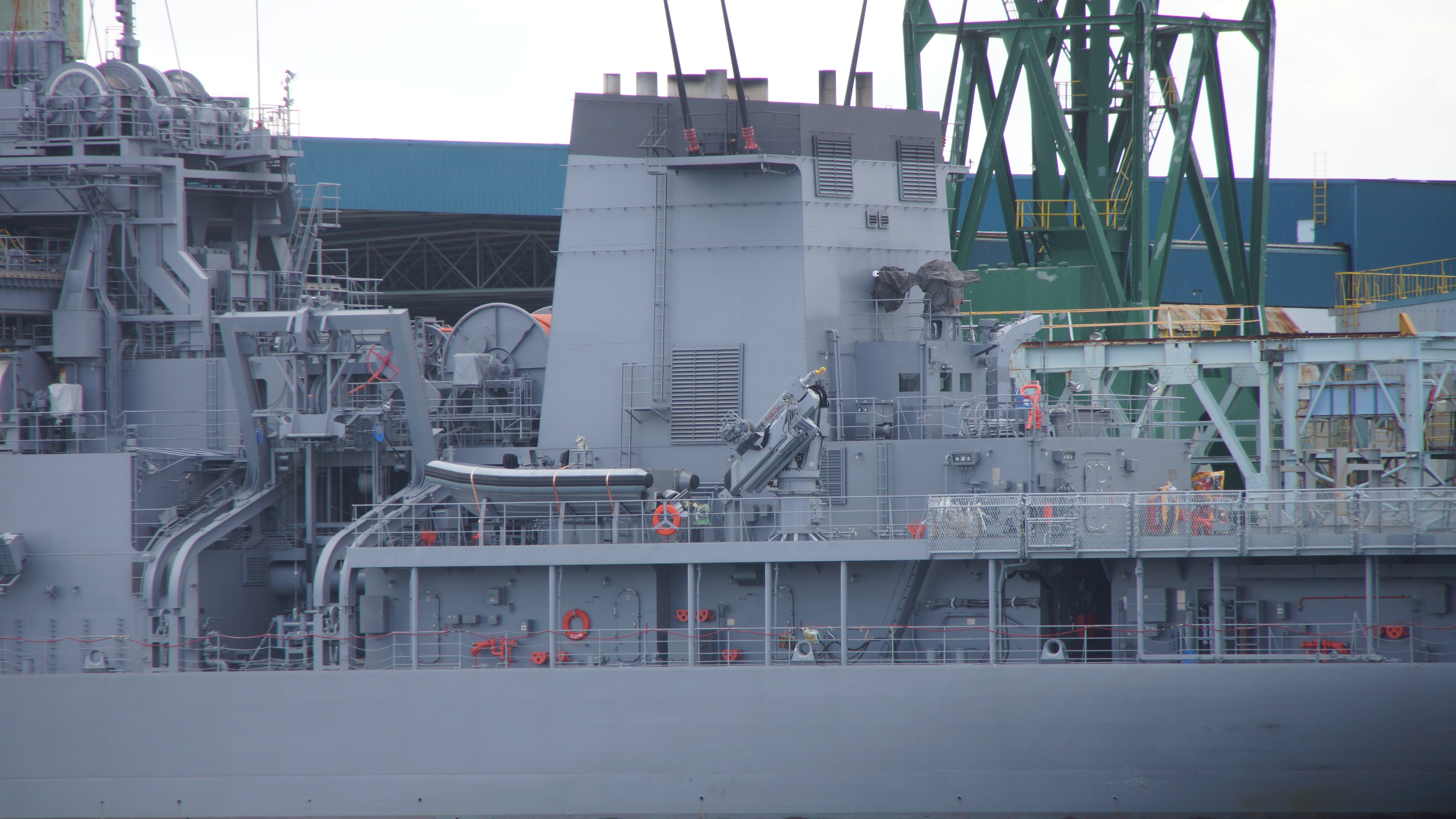
JS Chiyoda at Kobe on 11 November 2017.

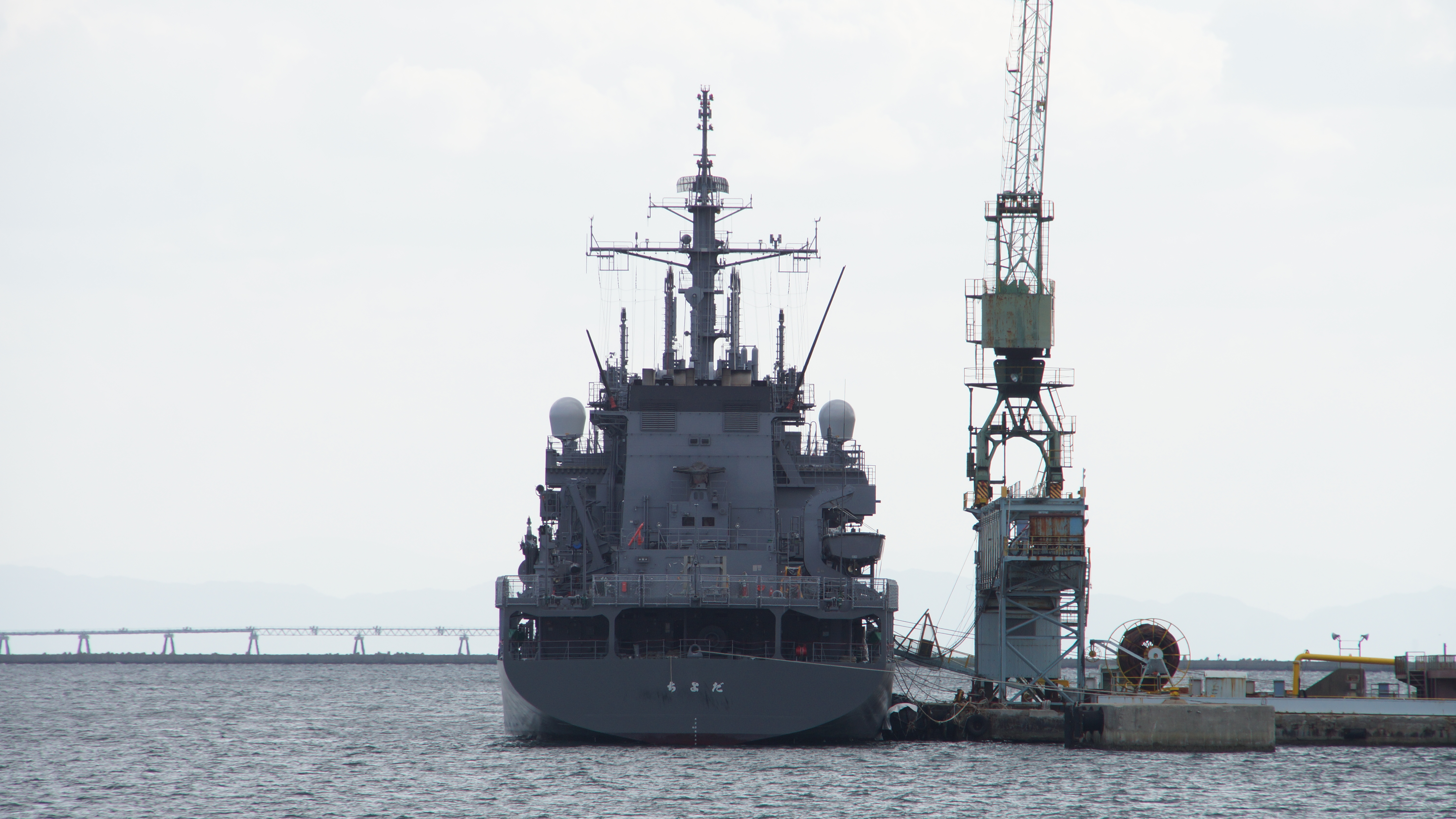
JS Chiyoda at Kobe on 11 November 2017.

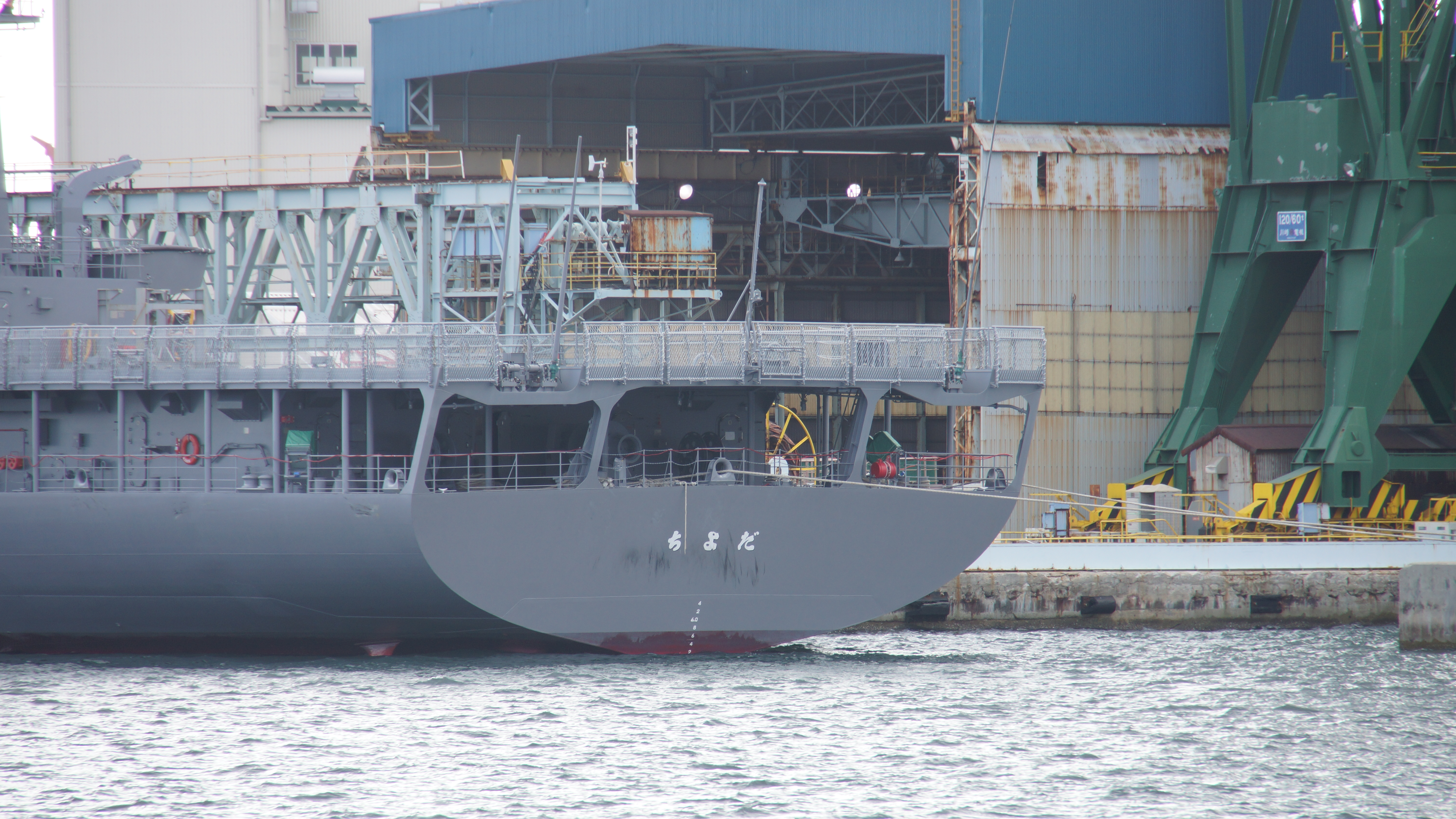
JS Chiyoda at Kobe on 11 November 2017.

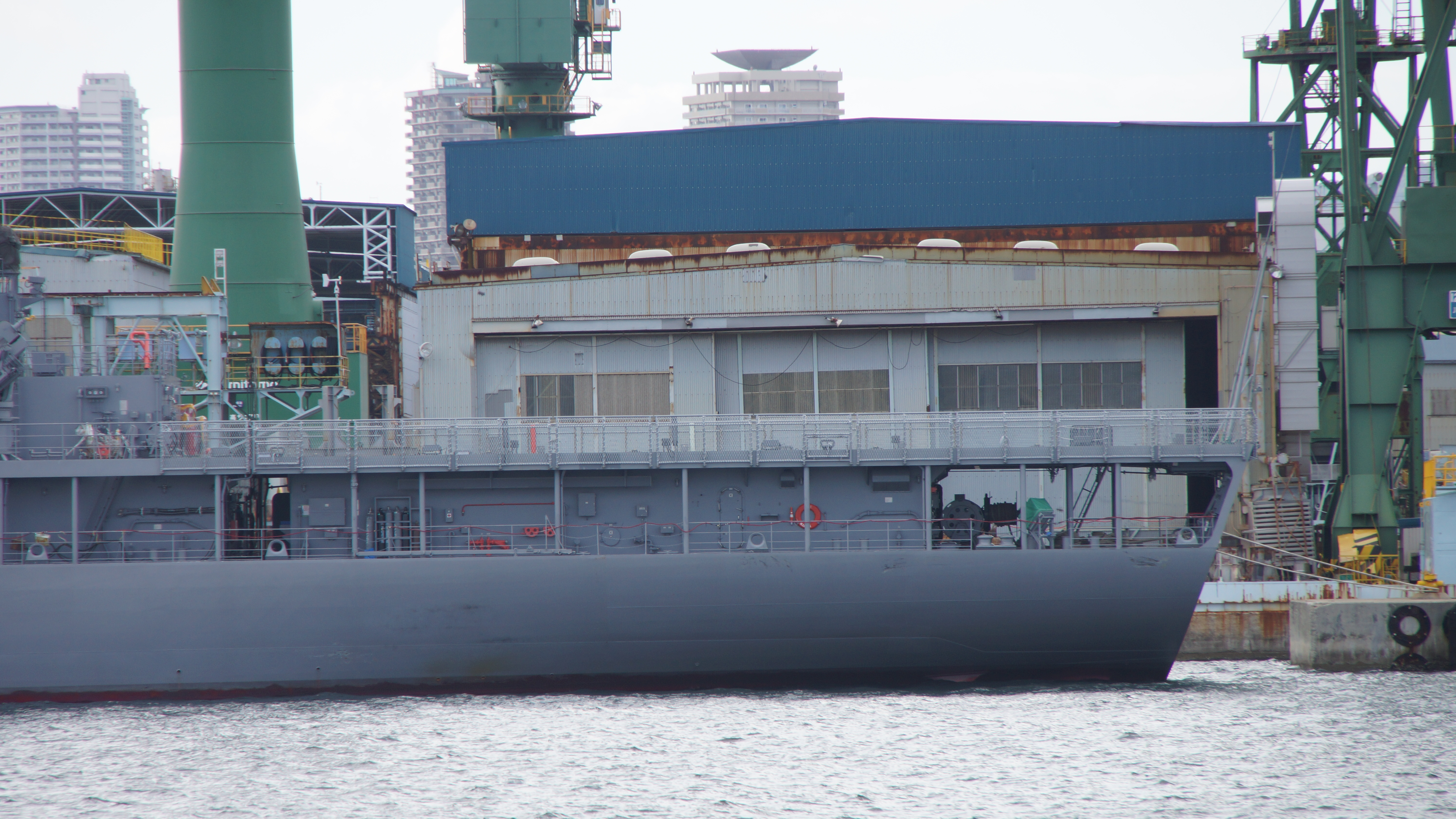
JS Chiyoda at Kobe on 11 November 2017.
