= Titagarh Rail Systems =

Indian railway rolling stock and engineering company

Titagarh Rail Systems Limited
- Type: Public
- Traded as: BSE: 532966; NSE: TITAGARH
- ISIN: INE615H01020
- Industry: Rail transportation Defence; Shipbuilding; Engineering
- Founded: 3 July 1997; 29 years ago
- Founder: Jagadish Prasad Chowdhary
- Headquarters: Titagarh Towers, 756 Anandapur, E.M. Bypass, Kolkata, West Bengal, India
- Key people: Jagadish Prasad Chowdhary (Founder and Chairman); Umesh Chowdhary (Vice Chairman and Managing Director); Anil Kumar Agarwal (Deputy Managing Director); Prithish Chowdhary (Deputy Managing Director); Saurav Singhania (Chief Financial Officer)
- Products: Freight wagons; Metro trains; Passenger trainsets; Vande Bharat trainsets; Railway propulsion systems; Railway components; Bridges; Defence equipment
- Revenue: ₹31.8582 billion (US$340 million) (FY2026)
- Net income: ₹1.2282 billion (US$13 million) (FY2026)
- Owners: Promoter group (40.46%)
- Subsidiaries: Titagarh Naval Systems Limited
- Website: www.titagarh.in

Titagarh Rail Systems Limited (TRSL) is an Indian manufacturer of railway rolling stock and transportation systems headquartered in Kolkata, West Bengal. The company manufactures freight wagons, metro coaches, passenger trainsets, propulsion and electrical systems, railway components and other transportation equipment.

The company is listed on both the Bombay Stock Exchange and the National Stock Exchange of India. Its operations are organised primarily around Freight Rail Systems and Passenger Rail Systems, while its shipbuilding operations are carried out through the wholly owned subsidiary Titagarh Naval Systems Limited.

As of 31 March 2026, Titagarh reported a standalone order book, including its wholly owned subsidiary, of approximately ₹142.4 billion (US$1.5 billion), and a total order book of approximately ₹275.4 billion (US$2.9 billion) after including its proportionate share of joint-venture projects.

== History ==
=== Origins ===
Founder Jagadish Prasad Chowdhary entered the railway-supply industry after acquiring the foundry division of Britannia Engineering at Titagarh, West Bengal, in 1982. The business initially concentrated on railway castings, including bogies, couplers and other components.

Titagarh Rail Systems Limited was incorporated on 3 July 1997 as Titagarh Wagons Limited and initially manufactured railway freight wagons. The company subsequently expanded into passenger rolling stock, metro trains, propulsion systems, bridges, shipbuilding and defence-related engineering.

=== International expansion ===
In 2010, the company acquired the assets and business of French railway wagon manufacturer Arbel Fauvet Rail (AFR). In August 2019, the Commercial Court of Paris approved a plan for the transfer of AFR's business and assets to another bidder and ordered its liquidation, following which Titagarh lost control of the subsidiary.

In 2015, Titagarh incorporated Titagarh Firema S.p.A., which acquired the business of Italian passenger-rail manufacturer Firema Trasporti on a going-concern basis. The acquisition provided Titagarh with passenger rolling-stock design and manufacturing capabilities, contributing to the development of its passenger-rail business in India.

On 4 March 2026, Firema completed the transfer of its operating business and assets to FS Fabbrica Italiana Treni S.p.A., a subsidiary of Italy's state-owned railway group Ferrovie dello Stato Italiane. Titagarh stated that Firema had helped establish its passenger rolling-stock business in India, including an aluminium car-body manufacturing facility, but had subsequently incurred substantial losses despite repeated financial support.

Titagarh's management stated in June 2026 that it had completed its exit from the Italian investment and did not expect further losses or liabilities relating to the operation.

== Business divisions ==
=== Freight Rail Systems ===
Freight rolling stock has historically accounted for the largest share of Titagarh's revenue. The company manufactures various types of freight wagons for Indian Railways and private-sector customers.

Titagarh's freight manufacturing facilities include wagon and foundry operations in West Bengal and a wagon and defence facility at Bharatpur, Rajasthan.

During FY2026, Titagarh dispatched 7,019 freight wagons. As of 31 March 2026, its outstanding freight order book comprised approximately 6,500 wagons for Indian Railways and private customers.

The company has also obtained a wagon-leasing licence from Indian Railways. Its first leasing order was for two rakes supplied to Balmer Lawrie on a ten-year operating lease.

In 2026, Titagarh received its first Indian Railways order for the design, manufacture, supply, testing and commissioning of Rail Borne Maintenance Vehicles, together with operation and maintenance services. The contract was valued at approximately ₹2.7324 billion (US$29 million) including taxes.

=== Passenger Rail Systems ===
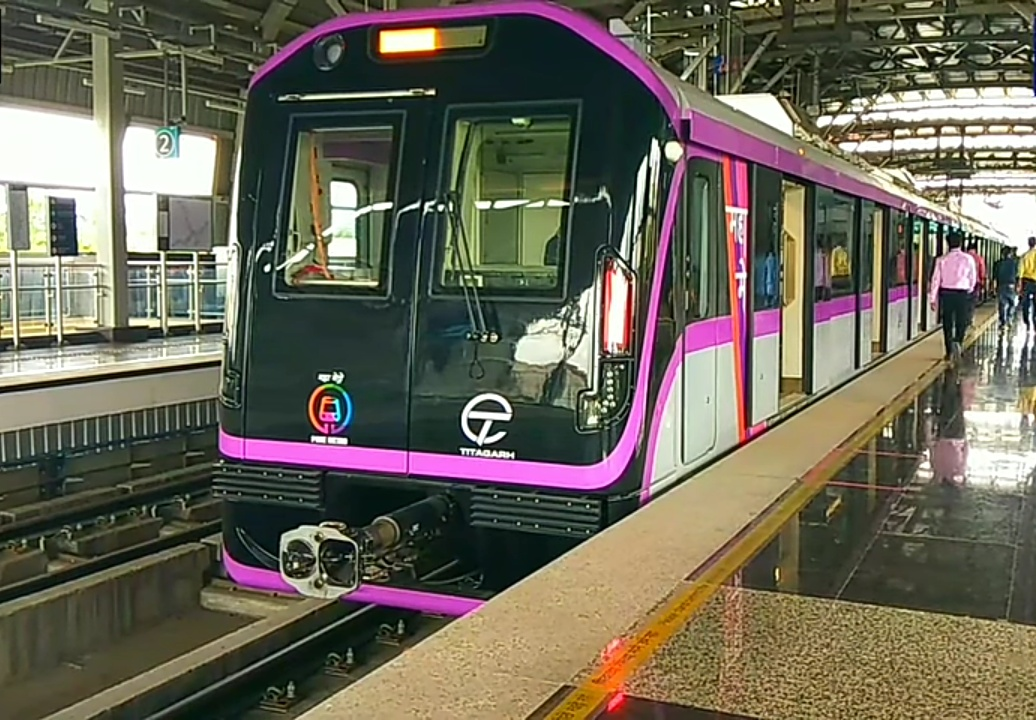
An aluminium metro trainset manufactured by Titagarh for the Pune Metro.

Titagarh's Passenger Rail Systems division manufactures metro trains, passenger coaches for semi-high-speed trains, EMU trainsets, propulsion systems, traction motors and associated electrical equipment.

The company's passenger rolling-stock manufacturing complex is located at Uttarpara in West Bengal. In FY2026, Titagarh acquired approximately 40 acres (16 ha) of additional land at Uttarpara for expansion of the facility, including a 1.6 kilometres (0.99 mi) test track.

Passenger Rail Systems revenue increased to approximately ₹5.3933 billion (US$58 million) in FY2026, compared with ₹2.5555 billion (equivalent to ₹2.6 billion or US$28 million in 2026) in FY2025. The division supplied 64 coaches during FY2026.

As of March 2026, Titagarh's passenger order book included 519 metro coaches, 1,280 Vande Bharat coaches, 71 propulsion sets and 571 traction motors.

== Metro projects ==
=== Pune Metro ===
In 2019, Titagarh secured a contract from Maha-Metro to design, manufacture and supply 102 aluminium-bodied metro coaches, forming 34 trainsets, for the Pune Metro. Three trainsets were to be manufactured at its facility in Italy, while the remaining 31 were to be produced in India.

By March 2026, Titagarh had delivered all 34 trainsets under the original order. The company subsequently received an option order for an additional 12 trainsets.

=== Ahmedabad Metro ===
Titagarh received a contract from Gujarat Metro Rail Corporation for the design, manufacture, supply, testing and commissioning of 30 standard-gauge coaches for the Ahmedabad Metro. The contract is valued at approximately ₹3.5 billion (US$37 million).

In FY2026, the company delivered the first indigenously manufactured stainless-steel coach for the Ahmedabad Metro project.

=== Surat Metro ===
Titagarh has a contract with Gujarat Metro Rail Corporation for 72 standard-gauge cars for the Surat Metro, valued at approximately ₹8.57 billion (US$92 million).

=== Bengaluru Metro ===
Titagarh is manufacturing 34 of 36 driverless stainless-steel trainsets for the Yellow Line of Bengaluru Metro. The first Make-in-India trainset produced by Titagarh was handed over in January 2025.

=== Mumbai Metro ===
Titagarh was awarded work associated with the manufacture of 108 standard-gauge coaches for Mumbai Metro Line 6, in association with NCC Limited. Titagarh's share of the project is approximately ₹25.01 billion (US$270 million).

=== Patna Metro ===
Titagarh has manufactured aluminium-bodied metro coaches for the Patna Metro. The company states that these coaches entered passenger service as part of Bihar's first metro railway.

== Vande Bharat ==
Titagarh is part of a consortium with Bharat Heavy Electricals Limited (BHEL) that secured a contract in 2023 to manufacture 80 Vande Bharat sleeper trainsets and maintain them for 35 years.

The overall contract is valued at approximately ₹240 billion (US$2.6 billion) and includes maintenance of the trainsets for 35 years. Final assembly is to take place at Indian Railways facilities in Chennai and Latur.

Titagarh and BHEL have also agreed to establish a 50:50 joint-venture company responsible for the maintenance component of the programme. Indian Railways has allotted maintenance depots at Shakur Basti in Delhi and Jogeshwari in Mumbai.

As of March 2026, Titagarh's order book included 1,280 Vande Bharat coaches.

== Railway wheels ==
In June 2023, Titagarh and Ramkrishna Forgings formed a joint venture, Ramkrishna Titagarh Rail Wheels Limited, to manufacture and supply forged railway wheels in India under the Atmanirbhar Bharat initiative.

The consortium was awarded a long-term contract by the Ministry of Railways for approximately 1.54 million forged wheels over 20 years.

The joint venture is establishing a manufacturing plant in Chennai, Tamil Nadu, designed for annual production of approximately 228,000 forged wheels. Titagarh holds a 49% stake in the venture.

As of March 2026, the estimated project cost was approximately ₹20 billion (US$210 million), with ₹5 billion (US$53 million) of equity having been infused by the partners.

== Propulsion and electrical systems ==
Titagarh manufactures traction motors, traction converters, Train Control and Monitoring Systems (TCMS), and other propulsion and electrical equipment for railway vehicles.

During FY2026, its indigenously developed propulsion system for electric multiple units received approval from the Research Design and Standards Organisation following a combined-system test.

The company has also expanded its cooperation with ABB relating to traction and train-control technology, including localization of traction converters, motors and train-control and management systems for metro applications.

== Shipbuilding and maritime systems ==
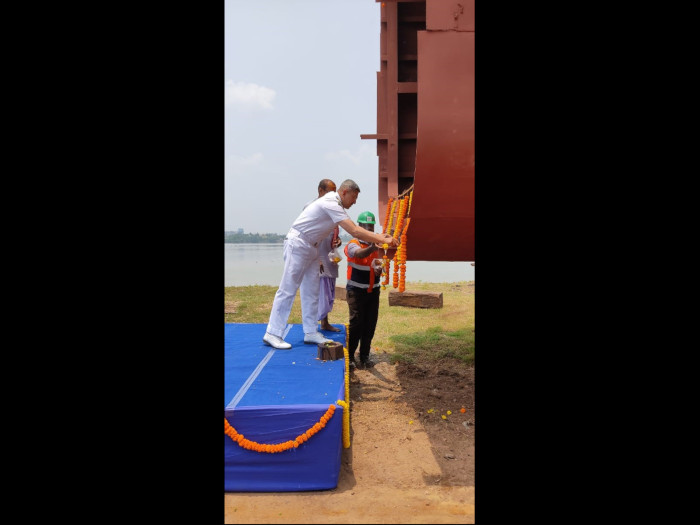
Keel laying for an Indian Navy Diving Support Craft at Titagarh's Kolkata shipyard in 2022.

Titagarh entered the shipbuilding industry in 2012 through the acquisition of Corporated Shipyard Private Limited. Its maritime activities have included the construction of naval vessels, tugs, coastal research vessels and inland water transport vessels.

On 1 January 2026, Titagarh transferred its shipbuilding and maritime-systems business into the wholly owned subsidiary Titagarh Naval Systems Limited (TNSL).

As of March 2026, the subsidiary had an order book of approximately ₹5 billion (US$53 million).

=== Falta shipyard ===
Titagarh Naval Systems is developing a new shipbuilding facility at Falta, south of Kolkata. The planned facility covers approximately 50 acres and is intended to build larger commercial and naval vessels.

The company has stated that the facility is being designed for vessels of up to approximately 180 metres (590 ft) in length.

=== Indian Navy vessels ===
In February 2021, Titagarh was awarded a contract by the Indian Navy for the construction of five Diving Support Craft (DSCs).

On 1 August 2026, Titagarh Naval Systems launched the fifth and final vessel in the series, A24 (Yard 329), into the Hooghly River.

The catamaran-type craft are intended to support the Navy's Command Clearance Diving Teams in underwater inspection, repair, maintenance and salvage operations. The Navy stated that the vessels have nearly 70 per cent indigenous content.

Titagarh has also constructed six 25-tonne bollard-pull tugs for the Indian Navy under a contract awarded in November 2021.

== Defence and engineering ==
Titagarh's Freight Rail Systems business also includes bridge and defence-related engineering activities.

In February 2024, Titagarh received an approximately ₹1.7 billion (US$18 million) order from the Ministry of Defence for the manufacture and supply of 250 specialised wagons.

The company's engineering activities have also included the manufacture of modular bridges and specialised defence equipment, such as mobile shelters and integrated field shelters.

== Hyperloop development ==
In July 2026, Titagarh entered into a strategic collaboration agreement with TuTr Hyperloop, an IIT Madras-incubated technology company, to investigate the development and commercialisation of Hyperloop-enabled freight-transport systems.

The agreement covers evaluation, design, development and integration of cargo-transport systems combining Titagarh's rolling-stock engineering capabilities with TuTr's propulsion and control technologies.

== Financial performance ==
For FY2026, Titagarh reported consolidated revenue from operations of approximately ₹31.8582 billion (US$340 million), compared with ₹38.6775 billion (US$410 million) in the restated FY2025 accounts.

Consolidated profit for FY2026 was approximately ₹1.2282 billion (US$13 million), compared with ₹865.1 million (US$9.2 million) for the restated previous year.

Financial year	Revenue from operations	Profit
2024–25	₹38.6775 billion (US$410 million)	₹865.1 million (US$9.2 million)
2025–26	₹31.8582 billion (US$340 million)	₹1.2282 billion (US$13 million)

During FY2026, the company generated approximately ₹3.1128 billion (US$33 million) in net cash from operating activities, compared with negative operating cash flow in the previous year.

== Facilities ==
Titagarh's principal manufacturing and engineering locations include:

- Kolkata / Uttarpara, West Bengal – passenger rolling stock
- West Bengal – freight wagon and foundry facilities
- Bharatpur, Rajasthan – wagons and defence products
- Hyderabad, Telangana – engineering centre
- Bengaluru, Karnataka – engineering centre
- Chennai, Tamil Nadu – forged-wheel joint venture
- Falta, West Bengal – Titagarh Naval Systems shipyard

The company also maintains regional offices and depots in several Indian cities.

== Corporate governance ==
As of 2026, Umesh Chowdhary serves as Vice Chairman and Managing Director. Anil Kumar Agarwal and Prithish Chowdhary serve as Deputy Managing Directors, while Saurav Singhania is Chief Financial Officer.

In 2025, the board approved Umesh Chowdhary's reappointment as Vice Chairman, Managing Director and CEO for a further five-year term beginning on 1 October 2025.

As of 31 March 2026, the promoter group held 40.46 per cent of the company's equity, followed by resident individual shareholders, foreign portfolio investors and mutual funds.

== See also ==
- Rail transport in India
- Vande Bharat Express
- Pune Metro
- Bengaluru Metro
- Ahmedabad Metro
- Surat Metro
- Diving support craft (Indian Navy)
- Bhishm-class tugboat
- BESCO
- Bharat Heavy Electricals Limited
