= Invisible (Patterson novel) =

2014 novel by James Patterson and David Ellis

- First edition
- Author: James Patterson & David Ellis
- Language: English
- Series: Private
- Genre: Thriller novel
- Publisher: Little, Brown and Company
- Publication date: June 23, 2014
- Publication place: United States
- Media type: Print (hardcover)
- Pages: 432 pp (first edition, hardcover)
- Followed by: Unsolved (2019)

Invisible is a novel written by James Patterson and David Ellis. It is part of the series 'Invisible' and it is followed by the book 'Unsolved' (2019)

== Plot ==
Emmy Dockery is an FBI research analyst on leave. She has been obsessed with a large number of fires in which a single person always died, including one involving her sister. Local authorities, finding no foul play, ruled all these fires were accidental. New fires fitting the pattern claimed by Emmy continue to occur. No one believes Emmy and some even think she has gone mad. By continuing to insist these explained fires were really murders, she has put her career with the FBI in jeopardy. Even her ex-fiancé (nicknamed "Books"), who is an ex-FBI agent, doubts her. But one day she finds something of interest to Books and a preliminary investigation is launched by the FBI with Books in charge of the investigation and with Emmy on the team. Soon more is found and this case becomes very important, as hundreds of suspect fires are found nationwide. The case becomes scary and dangerous to members of the team, as well.

== Reviews ==
This book is mentioned in several publications. Invisible was number two at one point on the USA Today best-seller list. The New York Journal of Books provided a positive review, saying, "Invisible is a difficult book to read because of the sheer horror and mayhem, but it's even tougher to put down." It was also on the New York Times Best Seller list for "Combined Print & E-Book Fiction" soon after it was released.
