= USS Invincible =

Two ships of the United States Navy have been named Invincible.

- USS Invincible (1918) (See List of Empire ships (P) Empire Porpoise)
- USNS Invincible (T-AGM-24)

== See also ==
- HMS Invincible
