= RSS Invincible =

Lead boat of the Invincible-class submarine

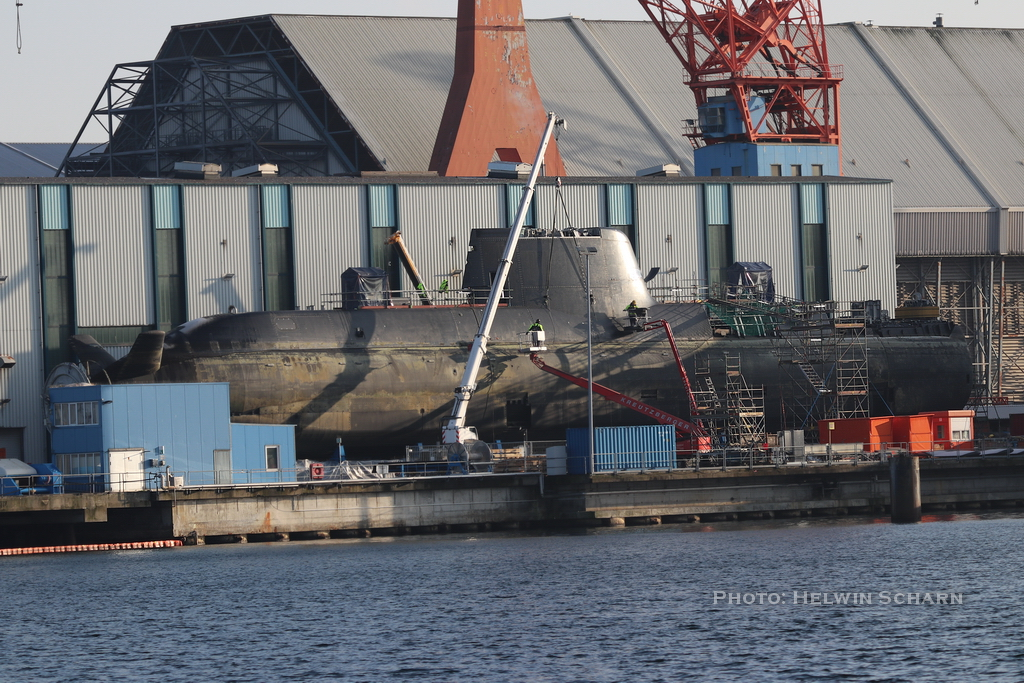
- RSS Invincible in drydock of the TKMS yard in Germany.

History

Singapore
- Name: Invincible
- Ordered: 2017
- Builder: ThyssenKrupp Marine Systems, Kiel, Germany
- Cost: $900 million
- Launched: 18 February 2019
- Acquired: 27 August 2024
- Commissioned: 24 September 2024

General characteristics
- Class & type: Invincible-class submarine
- Displacement: 2,200 tonnes (2,200 long tons) submerged; 2,000 tonnes (2,000 long tons) tonnes surfaced
- Length: 70 m (229 ft 8 in)
- Beam: 6.3 m (20 ft 8 in)
- Installed power: 2 × 120 kW PEM fuel cells
- Propulsion: Air-independent propulsion
- Speed: 15 knots (28 km/h; 17 mph) (Submerged); 10 knots (19 km/h; 12 mph) (Surfaced)
- Complement: 28
- Armament: 8 torpedo tubes

RSS Invincible is the lead ship of the Invincible-class submarines. She was launched on 18 February 2019 in Kiel, Germany.

== Design ==
The customised design is oceangoing and larger than the Challenger and Archer-class submarines operated by the Singapore Navy. The design is expected to be influenced by the export Type 214 submarine or Type 216 submarine, which have been designed for the potential needs of several other navies (Australian, Canadian and Indian). Features will include AIP and a combat system designed by both Atlas Elektronik and ST Electronics. The Invincible class also features an "X" rudder "which offers enhanced manoeuvrability in confined littoral waters, as opposed to the Type 214's cruciform rudder arrangement.

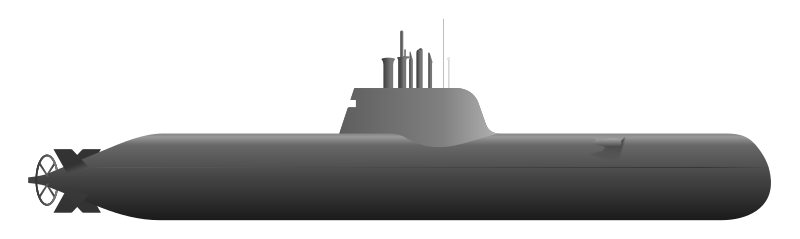
Type 218SG Republic of Singapore Navy Invincible-class submarine rendering.

The X rudder is used on the Type 212 submarine and its larger and newer derivative, the Dolphin 2-class submarine built for the Israeli Navy which is almost identical in size to the Invincible-class submarine (Israel and Singapore have deep military ties and frequently procure the same weapon systems across their military platforms).

The subs are believed to have Horizontal Multi-Purpose Airlock, which can be used to launch either torpedoes, divers, or special forces assault teams, and also have the capability to launch cruise-missiles while submerged with an option for Vertical Multi-Purpose Airlock, for launching missile vertically, like the Tomahawk, Blue Spear or Naval Strike Missile.

== Service history ==
Invincible participated in Exercise Pacific Reach 2025 (XPR 25), a biennial exercise hosted by the Republic of Singapore Navy (RSN). The exercise included a harbour phase, between 15 and 20 September, at Changi Naval Base and was followed by a sea phase from 21 to 25 September in the South China Sea. This phase saw the participation of three rescue units embarked on their respective submarine rescue ships — INS Nistar, MV Swift Rescue and JS Chiyoda of the Indian Navy (IN), RSN and the Japan Maritime Self-Defense Force (JMSDF). These submarine rescue ships operated alongside the submarines of Republic of Korea Navy, RSN and JMSDF which simulated as Disabled Submarines (DISSUBs). On 23 and 24 September, India's DSRV Tiger X, deployed from Nistar, conducted mating and rescue exercise with ROKS Shin Dol-seok (SS-082) and Invincible, respectively. On 25 September, a coordinated rescue drill was hosted by RSN. This was a "three-asset rescue (R3)", the first-of-its-kind in the history of Pacific Reach. Nistar led the formation, assisting the other rescue ships by localising and surveying the datum and then passing requisite information to Swift Rescue and Chiyoda. While Invincible simulated as the DISSUB, India's ROV and DSRV Tiger X, part of the Submarine Rescue Unit (East), were deployed and the mating was completed within an hour.
