= ROKS Shin Dol-seok =

Sohn Won-yil-class submarine

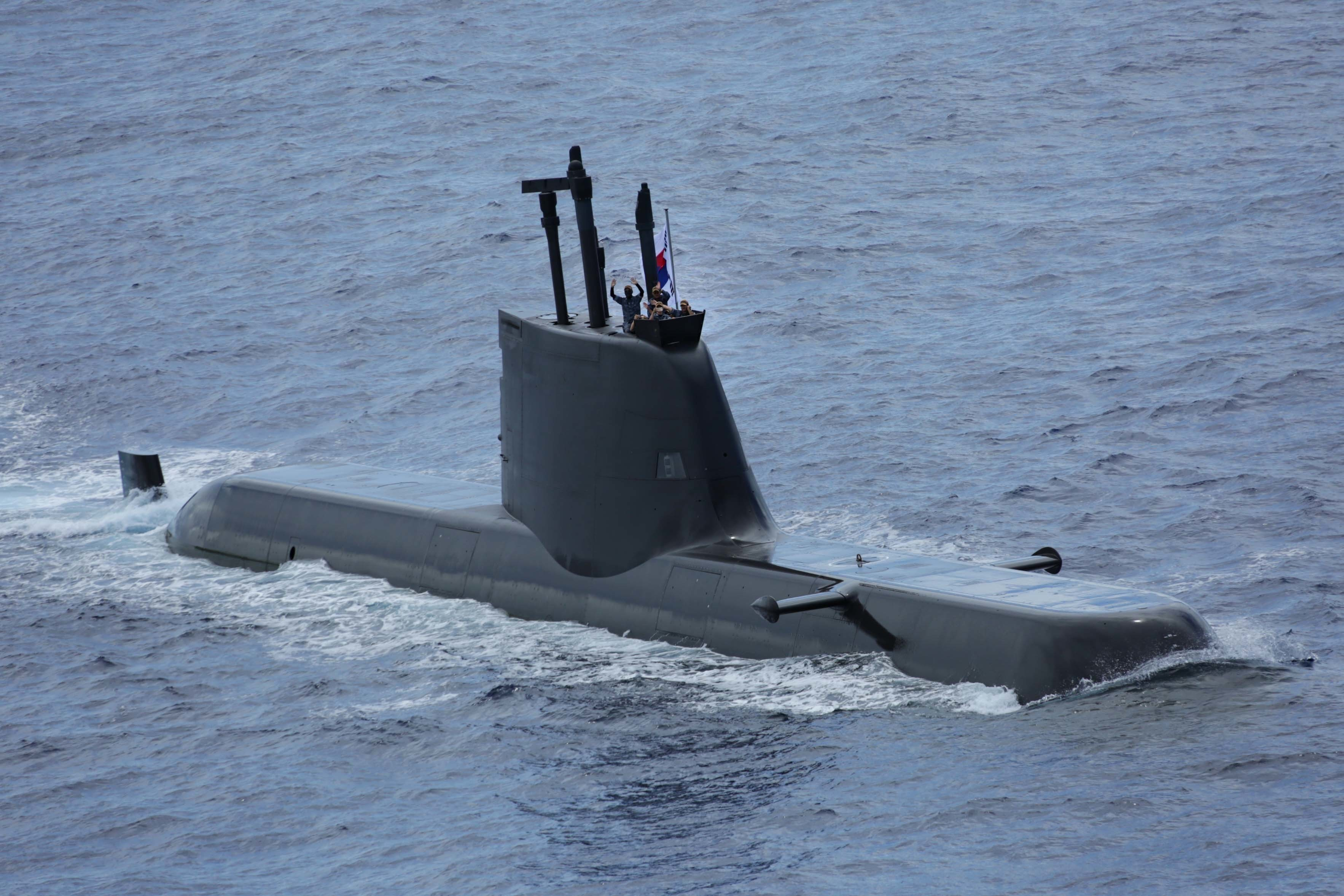
- Shin Dol-seok sailing during the RIMPAC 2022 exercise

History

South Korea
- Name: Shin Dol-seok; (신돌석)
- Namesake: Shin Dol-seok
- Builder: Hyundai Heavy Industries
- Laid down: 2013
- Launched: 7 September 2017
- Acquired: 17 December 2019
- Commissioned: 31 January 2020
- Identification: Pennant number: SS-082
- Status: Active

General characteristics
- Class & type: Sohn Won-yil-class submarine
- Displacement: 1,690 t (1,660 long tons) (surfaced); 1,860 t (1,830 long tons) (submerged)
- Length: 65 m (213 ft 3 in)
- Beam: 6.3 m (20 ft 8 in)
- Draught: 6 m (19 ft 8 in)
- Propulsion: Diesel-electric, fuel cell AIP, low noise skew back propeller
- Speed: 12 knots (22 km/h; 14 mph) surfaced; 20 knots (37 km/h; 23 mph) submerged
- Range: 12,000 nmi (22,000 km; 14,000 mi) (surfaced); 420 nmi (780 km; 480 mi) at 8 knots (15 km/h; 9.2 mph) (submerged); 1,248 nmi (2,311 km; 1,436 mi) at 4 knots (7.4 km/h; 4.6 mph) (submerged)
- Endurance: 84 days
- Test depth: nearly 400 m (1,300 ft)
- Complement: 5 officers + 22 crew
- Armament: 8 × 533 mm (21.0 in) torpedo tubes; 4 Sub-Harpoon missile-capable

ROKS Shin Dol-seok (SS-082) is the ninth boat of the Sohn Won-yil-class submarine in the Republic of Korea Navy. She is named after the general, Shin Dol-seok.

== Design ==
There are media reports that the Sohn Won-yil is equipped with eight 533 mm torpedo tubes, and that South Korea will mount a Korean Tomahawk missile, Hyunmoo-3, with a range of 500 km. It is said that they are also developing versions with a range of 1000 km and 1500 km, but there was no confirmation of whether this version could be mounted on a 533mm torpedo tube. Originally, the American Tomahawk missile was conceptually designed to be launched from a 533mm torpedo tube. Korea has also recently succeeded in localizing it.

The Cheonryong missile with a range of 500 km has been installed in the Sohn Won-yil-class and has been deployed and is in operation.

Germany, which exported the Sohn Won-yil-class (class 214), is using a Type 212 submarine that uses the same AIP system with the same displacement. It has a range of 20 km, and is equipped with four 533 mm torpedo tube, and is capable against air, surface, and submarine targets.

== Construction and career ==
ROKS Shin Dol-seok was launched on 7 September 2017 by Hyundai Heavy Industries and commissioned on 31 January 2020.

In May 2022, the ROKN announced that the Shin Dol-seok and the Dokdo-class amphibious assault ship, ROKS Marado LPH-6112, will take part in the RIMPAC 2022.

Shin Dol-seok participated in Exercise Pacific Reach 2025 (XPR 25), a biennial exercise hosted by the Republic of Singapore Navy (RSN). The exercise included a harbour phase, between 15 and 20 September, at Changi Naval Base and was followed by a sea phase from 21 to 25 September in the South China Sea. This phase saw the participation of three rescue units embarked on their respective submarine rescue ships — INS Nistar, MV Swift Rescue and JS Chiyoda of the Indian Navy (IN), RSN and the Japan Maritime Self-Defense Force (JMSDF). These submarine rescue ships operated alongside the submarines of Republic of Korea Navy, RSN and JMSDF which simulated as Disabled Submarines (DISSUBs). On 23 and 24 September, India's DSRV Tiger X, deployed from Nistar, conducted mating and rescue exercise with Shin Dol-seok and Invincible, respectively. On 25 September, a coordinated rescue drill was hosted by RSN. This was a "three-asset rescue (R3)", the first-of-its-kind in the history of Pacific Reach. Nistar led the formation, assisting the other rescue ships by localising and surveying the datum and then passing requisite information to Swift Rescue and Chiyoda. While Invincible simulated as the DISSUB, India's ROV and DSRV Tiger X, part of the Submarine Rescue Unit (East), were deployed and the mating was completed within an hour.
