= HMS Invincible =

Seven ships of the Royal Navy have been named HMS Invincible.

- HMS Invincible (1747) was originally the French 74-gun ship of the line L'Invincible, captured off Cape Finisterre in 1747. She was the first purpose-built 74-gun ship of the line to serve in the Royal Navy. The ship sank in February 1758 when she hit a sandbank in the East Solent.
- HMS Invincible (1765) was a 74-gun third rate launched in 1765 at Deptford Dockyard and commissioned at Portsmouth in 1776. Her career saw her involvement in the Battle of Cape St. Vincent (1780) (against the Spanish fleet) and the Battle of St. Kitts and the Glorious First of June (both against the French fleet). She was also involved in the capture of St. Lucia, Trinidad and Surinam. She was wrecked off the Norfolk coast in 1801, with the loss of 400 lives.
- HMS Invincible (1808) was a 74-gun ship, launched at Woolwich in 1808. She saw action in the Peninsular War, supporting the British forces. She was paid off in 1814, and broken up in 1861, in Plymouth.
- HMS Invincible was to have been the world's second ocean-going iron-hulled armoured frigate, and sister to HMS Warrior, but she was renamed HMS Black Prince before her launch.
- HMS Invincible (1869) was an armoured "broadside battleship" built in 1869. She was renamed Erebus in 1904 and Fisgard II in 1906, before foundering in a storm in 1914.
- HMS Invincible (1907) was the lead ship of her class of battlecruiser. She saw action at Battle of Heligoland Bight, the Battle of the Falkland Islands, and the Battle of Jutland, where she blew up and sank after taking a hit from SMS Lützow, with the loss of 1,026 crew. Only six crew members survived.
- HMS Invincible (R05) was a light aircraft carrier, the first of three in the Invincible class. She served from 1980 to 2005, including service in the Falklands War. She was scrapped in Turkey in 2011.

== Battle honours ==
- St Vincent, 1780
- St Kitts, 1782
- Glorious First of June, 1794
- Alexandria, 1882
- Heligoland, 1914
- Falkland Islands, 1914
- Jutland, 1916
- Falkland Islands, 1982

== In fiction ==
- HMS Invincible, an aircraft carrier in the 1941 film Ships with Wings, portrayed by HMS Ark Royal (91)

== See also ==
- Invincible (ship)
- Invincible class
- French ship Invincible
- List of French privateers named for Napoleon Bonaparte
