= Invincible class =

Invincible class may refer to:

- Invincible-class battlecruiser, British Royal Navy class in service from 1908 to 1921
- Invincible-class aircraft carrier, 1980s British Royal Navy class
- Invincible-class submarine, Singaporean Navy class in service from 2019
- Invicinble-class ballistic nuclear submarine, French navy class under construction

== See also ==
- Invincible (ship)
