= French ship Invincible =

A number of ships of the French Navy have borne the name Invincible; among them:

== Ships of the French Navy named Invincible ==
- French ship Invincible (1666), a 64-gun ship of the line
- French galley Invincible (1674), a galley
- French galley Invincible (1680), a galley
- French galley Invincible (1688), a galley built in 1683, better known as Réale, bore the name between 1688 and 1691.
- French ship Invincible (1690), a 70-gun ship of the line
- French galley Invincible (1691), a galley
- French ship Invincible (1747), 74-gun ship of the line
- French ship Invincible (1780), 110-gun ship of the line
- French ironclad Invincible (1861), Gloire-class warship
Ships of the French Navy named Invincible
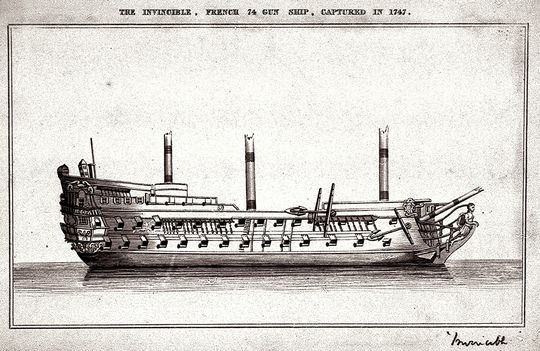
Invincible (1747)

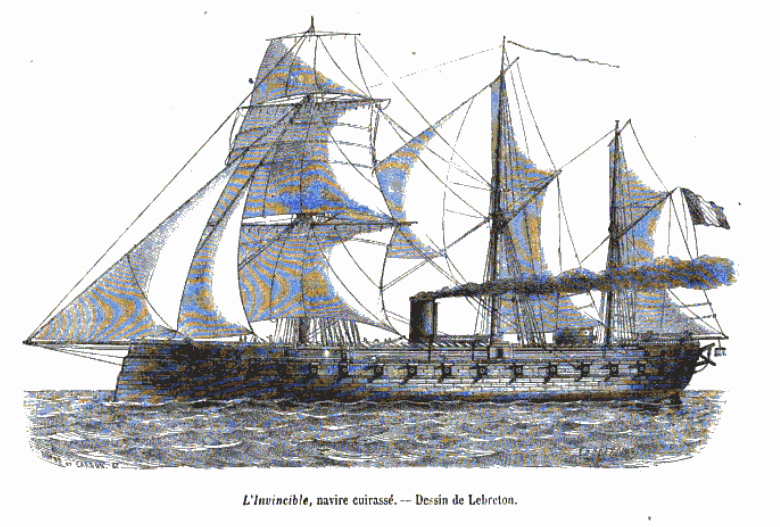
Invincible (1861)

== See also ==
- List of French privateers named for Napoleon Bonaparte
- HMS Invincible
- L'Invincible-class submarine
