= USS Blandy =

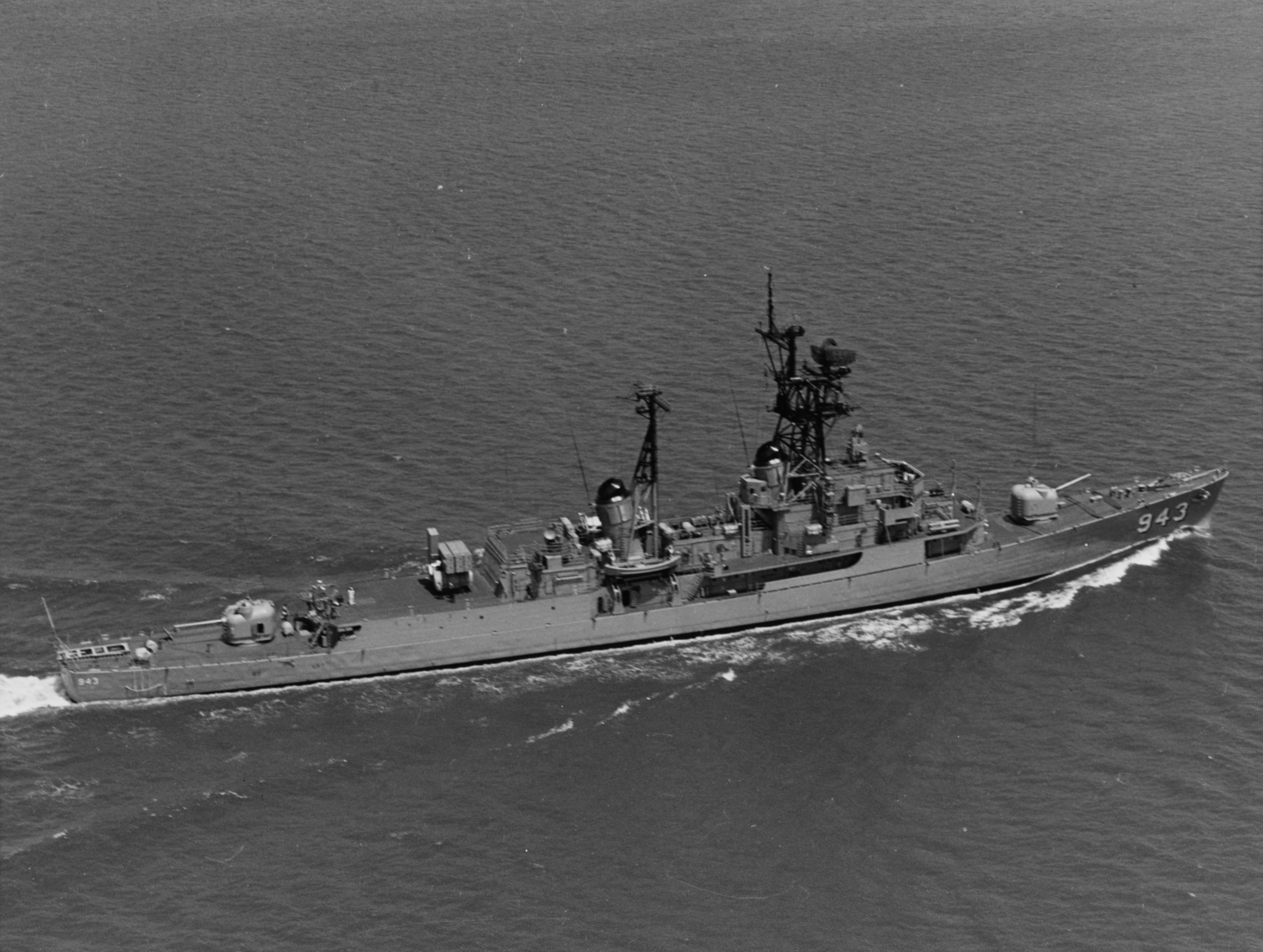
- USS Blandy underway in 1970

History

United States
- Namesake: William H. P. Blandy
- Ordered: 23 October 1954
- Builder: Bethlehem Steel, Fore River Shipyard
- Laid down: 29 December 1955
- Launched: 19 December 1956
- Acquired: 20 November 1957
- Commissioned: 26 November 1957
- Decommissioned: 5 November 1982
- Stricken: 27 July 1990
- Motto: Pax per potestatem
- Fate: Sold for scrap, 11 December 1992

General characteristics
- Class & type: Forrest Sherman-class destroyer
- Displacement: 2,800 tons standard.; 4,050 tons full load.
- Length: 407 ft (124 m) waterline, 418 ft (127 m) overall.
- Beam: 45 ft (14 m)
- Draft: 22 ft (6.7 m)
- Propulsion: 4 × 1,200 psi (8.3 MPa) Foster-Wheeler boilers, Westinghouse steam turbines; 70,000 shp (52 MW); 2 × shafts.
- Speed: 32.5 knots (60.2 km/h; 37.4 mph)
- Range: 4,500 nmi. at 20 knots; (8,300 km at 37 km/h)
- Complement: 15 officers, 218 enlisted.
- Armament: 3 × 5 in (127 mm) 54 calibre dual purpose Mk 42 guns; 4 × 3 in (76 mm) 50 calibre Mark 33 anti-aircraft guns; 2 × mark 10/11 Hedgehogs; 6 × 12.75 in (324 mm) Mark 32 torpedo tubes.

USS Blandy (DD-943) was a Forrest Sherman-class destroyer, named for Admiral William H. P. Blandy USN (1890–1954),

Blandy was built by the Bethlehem Steel Corporation's Fore River Shipyard in Quincy, Massachusetts, and was launched 19 December 1956, sponsored by Mrs. John M. (Hope "Toni" Blandy) Lee, daughter of Admiral Blandy; and commissioned 26 November 1957.

== History ==
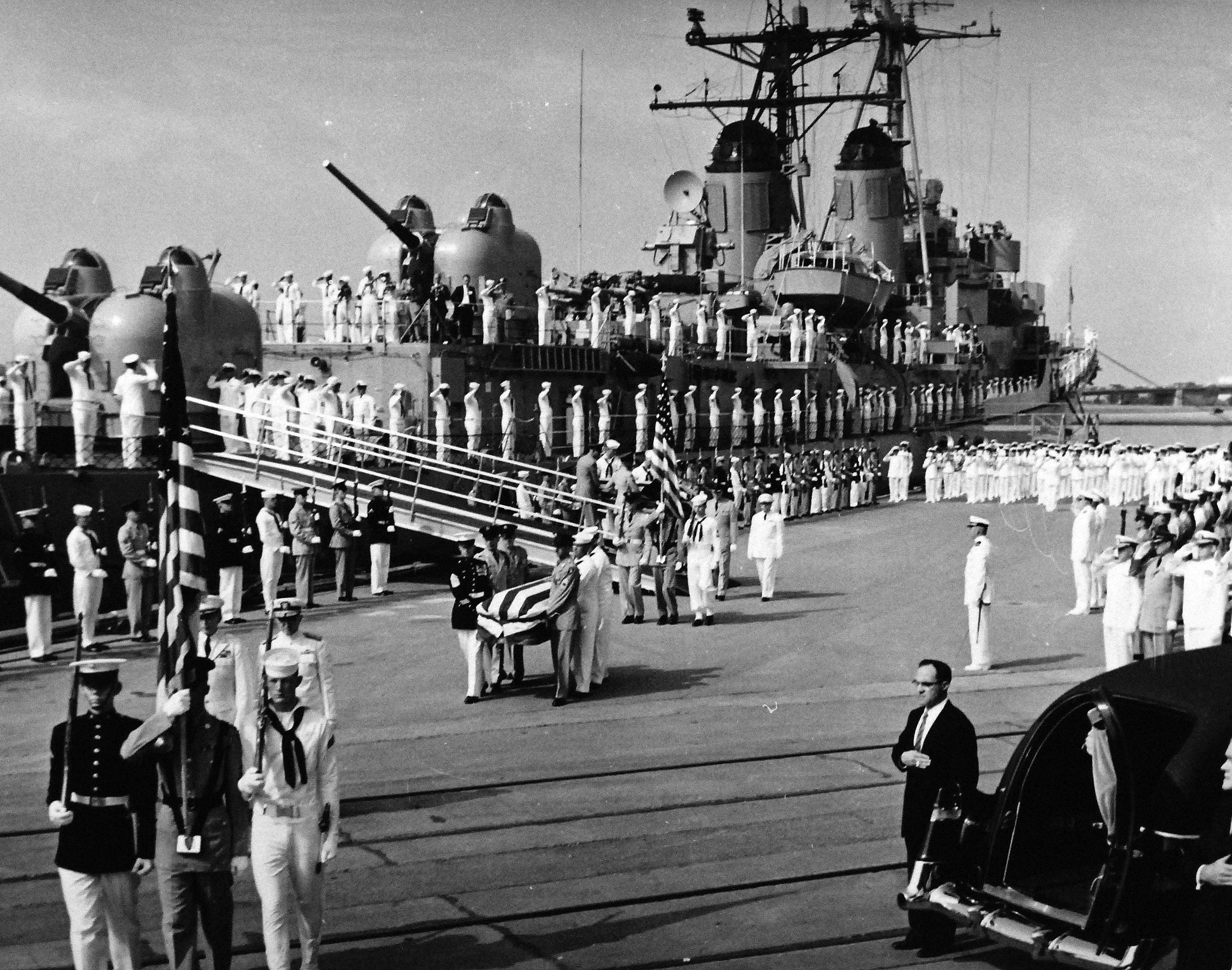
The caskets of the Unknown Soldiers of World War II and the Korean War are borne from the Blandy (May 28, 1958).

In 1958, Blandy bore the American Unknown Soldier of World War II's European Theater from Naples to a rendezvous off the Virginia Capes with Boston (CAG-1), which bore the Unknowns of the Pacific Theater and the Korean War, and Canberra (CAG-2). After the selection of the Unknown of World War II was made on board Canberra, the selected casket and the Korean Unknown were transferred to Blandy for transportation to Washington, D.C. Arriving at the U.S. Naval Gun Factory on 28 May, both caskets lay in state in the Capitol Rotunda until 30 May, after which they were interred in the Tomb of the Unknowns in Arlington National Cemetery.

In 1961, Blandy won the Marjorie Sterrett Battleship Fund Award for the Atlantic Fleet.

On October 30, 1962, Blandy tracked Soviet submarine B-130, dropping small charges and following the submarine in an attempt to bring it to the surface. After seventeen hours, the submarine's commander, Captain Nikolai Shumkov, ordered the submarine - at this point running with reduced diesel power and minimal oxygen - to surface.

In 1968, Blandy was awarded the Arleigh Burke Fleet Trophy award for all Atlantic Fleet.

On 7 December 1970 BLANDY was transiting the passage between the Dominican Republic and Puerto Rico, at 2118Z when the nuclear submarine USS JACK SSN 605 took her picture:

== Fate ==
The ship was decommissioned on 5 November 1982 and struck from the Navy List on 27 July 1990.

She was sold for scrap to the Fore River Shipyard and Iron Works on 11 December 1992. When the shipyard went bankrupt in 1993, she was resold to N. R. Acquisition Incorporated of New York City by the Massachusetts Bankruptcy Court and scrapped by Wilmington Resources of Wilmington in North Carolina in 1996.

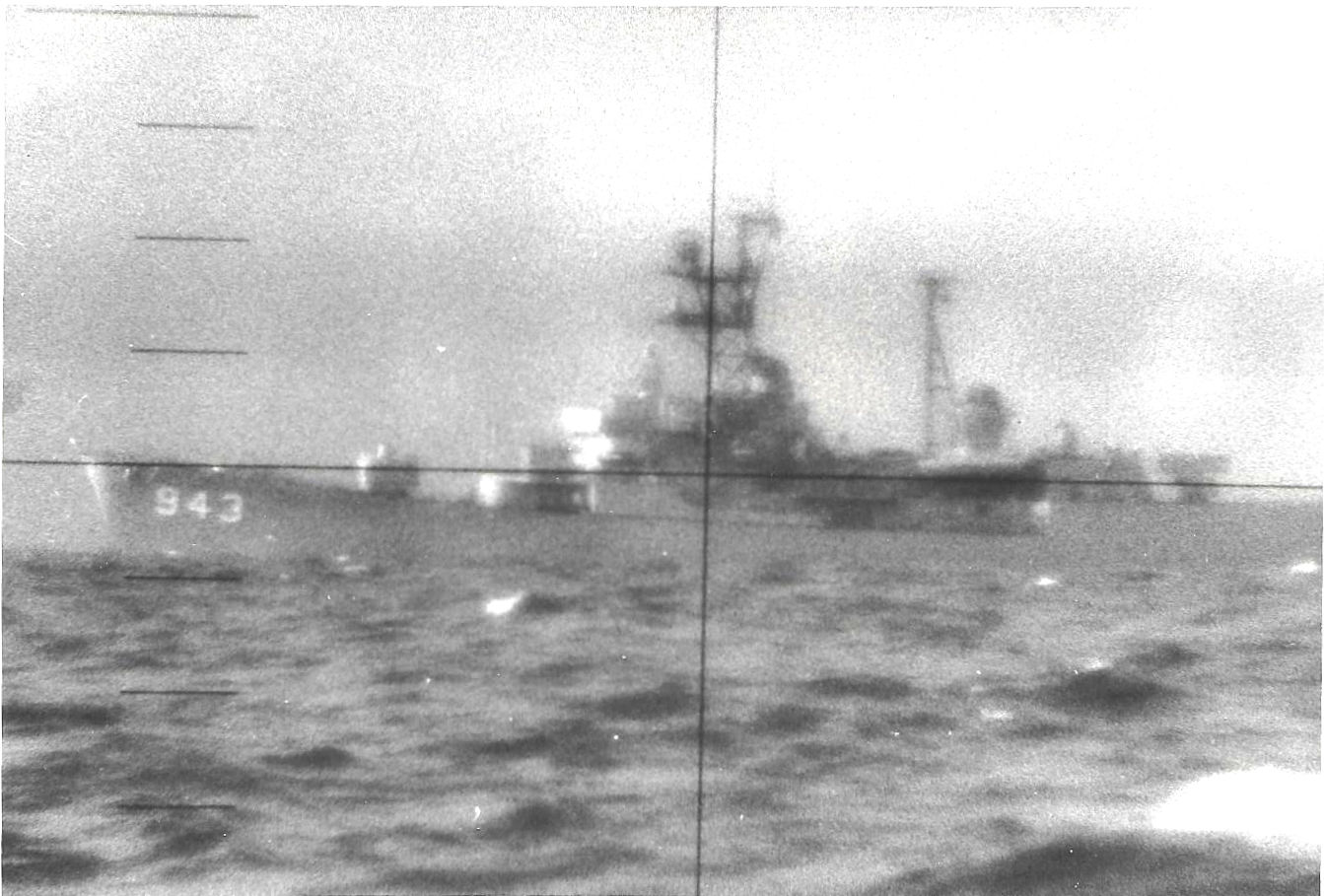
On 7 December 1970 BLANDY was transiting the passage between the Dominican Republic and Puerto Rico, at 2118Z (picture by the nuclear submarine USS JACK SSN 605)

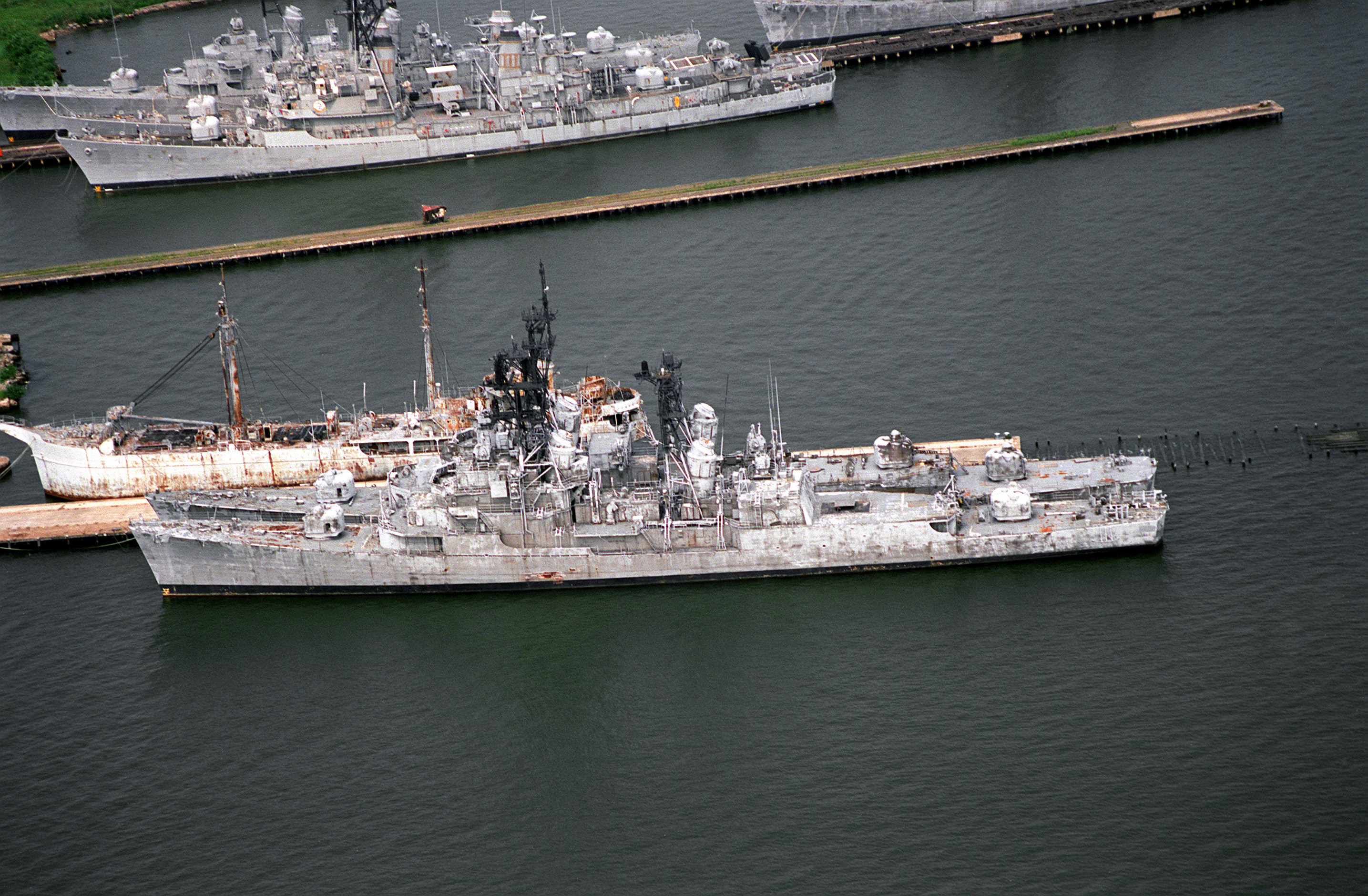
Blandy (foreground) at Baltimore prior to scrapping.

== See also ==
- List of United States Navy destroyers
