= USS Glenard P. Lipscomb =

Unique nuclear attack submarine

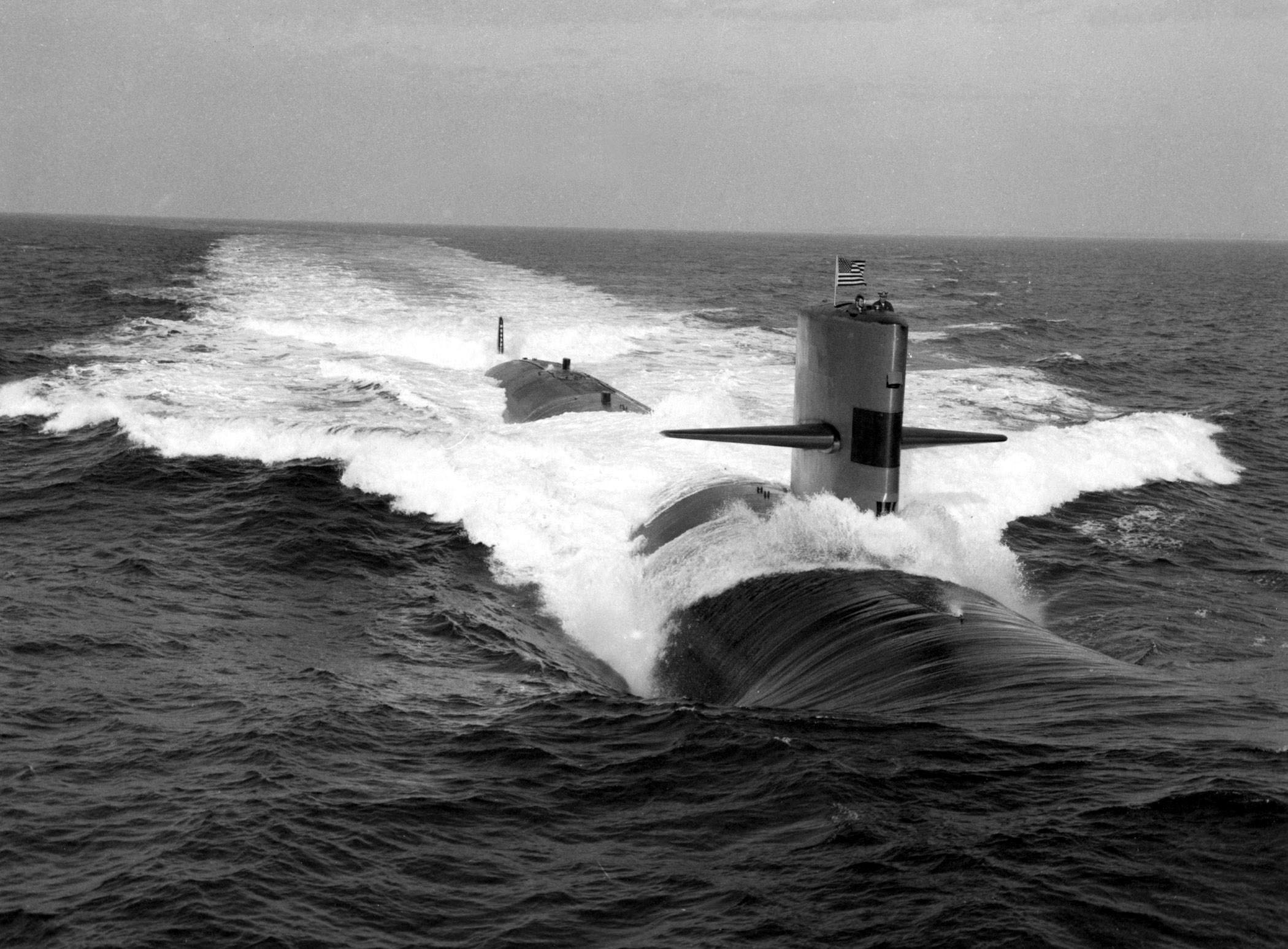
- USS Glenard P. Lipscomb

History

United States
- Name: USS Glenard P. Lipscomb
- Namesake: Glenard P. Lipscomb (1915–1970)
- Awarded: 16 December 1968
- Builder: General Dynamics Electric Boat, Groton, Connecticut
- Laid down: 5 June 1971
- Launched: 4 August 1973
- Sponsored by: Mrs. Glenard P. Lipscomb
- Commissioned: 21 December 1974
- Decommissioned: 11 July 1990
- Stricken: 11 July 1990
- Identification: SSN-685
- Nickname(s): "The Lipscombfish / Glenny P"
- Fate: Entered Ship-Submarine Recycling Program 1997

General characteristics
- Type: Nuclear submarine
- Displacement: 5,813 long tons (5,906 t) surfaced; 6,480 long tons (6,584 t) submerged
- Length: 365 ft (111 m)
- Beam: 31 ft 8 in (9.65 m)
- Propulsion: S5W reactor
- Speed: 18 knots (33 km/h; 21 mph) surfaced; 23 knots (43 km/h; 26 mph) submerged
- Test depth: 1,300 ft (400 m)
- Complement: 12 officers, 109 men
- Armament: 4 × 21 in (533 mm) torpedo tubes

USS Glenard P. Lipscomb (SSN-685) was a unique nuclear-powered attack submarine of the United States Navy.

The submarine was named after Glenard P. Lipscomb, who served as a representative from California's 24th congressional district from 1953 until his death in 1970.

== Design ==
Glenard P. Lipscomb was developed under project SCB 302.68. She was the U.S. Navy's second submarine design using a turbo-electric transmission; the first was the smaller USS Tullibee. Glenard P. Lipscomb was intended to test the potential advantages of this propulsion system for providing quieter and safer operation for a full sized attack submarine (safer because reverse thrust would be instantaneous with reversal of the direct current engine's electric polarity). The Tullibee plant had to be scaled up by a factor of six, which resulted in a displacement of 6,400 tons and a length of 365 feet (111 m). Glenard P. Lipscomb was thus larger than similar vessels with conventional drive trains, which resulted in slower speeds due to the greater displacement and wetted area. Her unique turbo-electric drive system was unreliable due to the decision to adopt a direct-current main motor. Subsequent U.S. submarine designs did not incorporate turbo-electric drive until the Columbia-class submarines. Other than the engine room, Glenard P. Lipscomb was generally similar to the Sturgeon class, and although serving as a test platform she was a fully combat-capable attack submarine.

== Construction ==
Construction of Glenard P. Lipscomb began on 5 June 1971 at the Electric Boat Company shipyard in Groton, Connecticut. Secretary of Defense Melvin R. Laird, a long-time colleague and friend of Glenard Lipscomb, spoke at the keel-laying ceremony. Glenard P. Lipscomb was launched on 4 August 1973, sponsored by Mrs. Glenard P. Lipscomb, and was commissioned on 21 December 1974.

== Career ==
Glenard P. Lipscomb deployed to the North Atlantic in the fall of 1976, followed immediately by a deployment to the Mediterranean Sea in the winter and spring of 1977. The boat was awarded the Meritorious Unit Commendation.

The submarine deployed to the North Atlantic in the winter and spring of 1978. Glenard P. Lipscomb was awarded the Meritorious Unit Commendation. She deployed to the Mediterranean Sea in the winter and spring of 1979.

Glenard P. Lipscomb was awarded the Commander, Submarine Development Squadron Twelve, Battle Efficiency [White] "E" and Engineering Excellence [Red] "E" for Fiscal Years 1977, 1978 under the command of Commander Robert B. Wilkinson and 1979, and 1980 under the command of Commander Thomas Robertson.

In 1987, she was involved in a collision with a tugboat in the Cooper River at Naval Weapons Station Charleston. Suffering slight damage to her towed array housing and propeller, she was required to spend an extra week in drydock to facilitate repairs. There were no injuries aboard the submarine; however, the tugboat sank as a result of the collision.

Glenard P. Lipscomb was decommissioned and struck from the Naval Vessel Register on 11 July 1990 and disposed of under the submarine recycling program at Puget Sound Naval Shipyard on 1 December 1997. Her active duty career of less than 16 years is one of the shortest for a nuclear submarine in the US Navy.

== See also ==
Other submarines with unique silencing features

- USS Tullibee (SSN-597)
- USS Jack (SSN-605)
- USS Narwhal (SSN-671)
