= S2C reactor =

Naval reactor used by the United States Navy

The S2C reactor is a naval reactor used by the United States Navy to provide electricity generation and propulsion on warships. It was notably small, and was designed for use in small hunter-killer attack submarines. The S2C designation stands for:

- S = Submarine platform
- 2 = Second generation core designed by the contractor
- C = Combustion Engineering was the contracted designer

This nuclear reactor is the shipboard equivalent of the S1C reactor, and was installed on the experimental USS Tullibee (SSN-597) submarine.

The reactor could reportedly produce around 2,500 shaft horsepower.
