= Arleigh Burke Fleet Trophy =

United States Navy award for improvement in battle efficiency

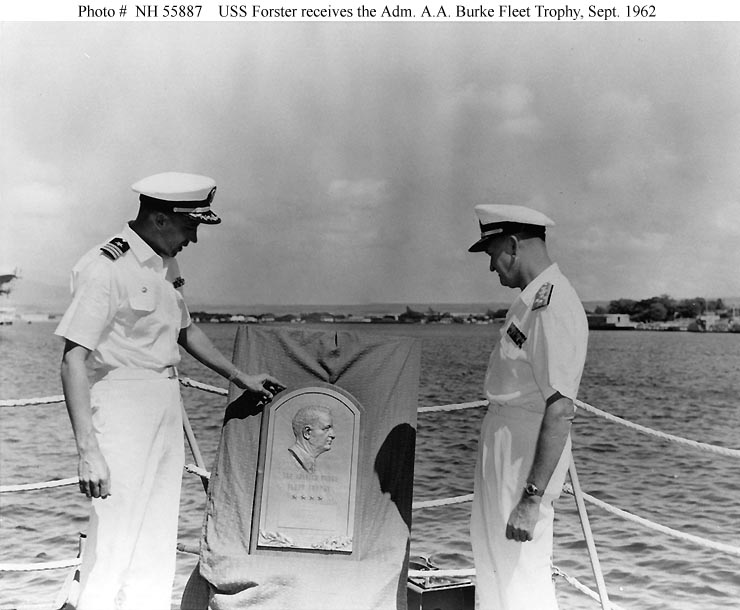
USS Forster receives the Adm A. A. Burke Fleet Trophy, September 1962.

The Arleigh Burke Fleet Trophy is an award presented annually by the United States Navy to the ship or aviation squadron that demonstrates the greatest improvement in battle efficiency from the previous year. Two commands annually, one from each coast earn the award.

== History ==
The Arleigh Burke Fleet Trophy was established by the Chief of Naval Operations on 1 August 1961. It was promulgated in OPNAV Instruction 3590.11 along with procedures for affecting the award.

The trophy honors former Chief of Naval Operations Admiral Arleigh Burke, a distinguished naval officer for over 38 years. His leadership and contribution to Naval warfare are embodied by this award. Arleigh Burke made vital contributions in many key warfare areas including battle efficiency, new tactical concepts, and weapons systems. The award recognizes an outstanding improvement in battle efficiency. The original trophy, sculpted by Hannibal De Bellis, was a brass plaque adorned with a profile of Admiral Burke.

== Winners ==
Year	Atlantic Fleet Winner	Pacific Fleet Winner
2024	USS Laboon (DDG-58)	USS Michael Murphy (DDG-112)
2023	USS Pasadena (SSN-752)	Strike Fighter Squadron 137 (VFA-137)
2022	USS Michigan (SSGN-727)	USS Albany (SSN-753)
2021	USS Jefferson City (SSN-759)	Patrol Squadron 8 (VP 8)
2020	USS Georgia (SSGN-729)	USS Seawolf (SSN-21)
2019	USS Tennessee (SSBN-734) - Gold	USS Nebraska (SSBN-739) - Gold
2018	USS Lassen (DDG-82)	Patrol Squadron 4 (VP-4)
2017	USS West Virginia (SSBN-736) - Gold	Electronic Attack Squadron 134 (VAQ-134)
2016	USS Anzio (CG-68)	USS Mississippi (SSN-782)
2015	USS Montpelier (SSN-765)	USS Texas (SSN-775)
2014	USS Ross (DDG-71)	USS Columbia (SSN-771)
2013	USS Wyoming (SSBN-742) - Gold	Electromagnetic Attack Squadron 142 (VAQ-142)
2012	USS Hartford (SSN-768)	Patrol Squadron 9 (VP 9)
2011	USS Bainbridge (DDG-96)	USS Buffalo (SSN-715)
2010	USS Norfolk (SSN-714)	USS Tortuga (LSD-46)
2009	USS West Virginia (SSBN-736) - Gold	Strike Fighter Squadron (VFA-147)
2008	Strike Fighter Squadron 37 (VFA-37)	USS Columbus (SSN-762)
2007	USS Providence (SSN-719)	USS Key West (SSN-722)
2006	Patrol Squadron 16 (VP-16)	USS Howard (DDG-83)
2005	Strike Fighter Squadron 31 (VFA-31)	USS Columbia (SSN-771)
2004	USS Barry (DDG-52)	Helicopter Anti-Submarine Squadron 2 (HS-2)
2003	USS Ticonderoga (CG-47)	USS Cheyenne (SSN-773)
2002	USS Springfield (SSN-761)	USS Bridge (AOE-10)
2001	USS Hayler (DD-997)	USS Ohio (SSBN-726) - Gold
2000	Patrol Squadron 45 (VP-45)	USS Santa Fe (SSN-763)
1999	Unknown	Unknown
1998	USS Oklahoma City (SSN-723)	Unknown
1997	Strike Fighter Squadron 14 (VFA-14)	Unknown
1996	Helicopter Anti-Submarine Warfare Squadron 15 (HS-15)	Unknown
1995	USS Boston (SSN-703)	Fleet Air Reconnaissance Squadron 5 (VQ-5)
1994	Unknown	USS Chicago (SSN-721)
1993	Helicopter Antisubmarine Squadron (Light) 48	Unknown
1992	Unknown	Unknown
1991	USS Shreveport (LPD-12)	USS Curts (FFG-38)
1990	Unknown	Navy Attack Squadron 145
1989	Unknown	Navy Attack Squadron 185
1988	USS Greenling (SSN-614)	USS San Jose (AFS-7)
1987	Unknown	USS Guardfish (SSN-612)
1986	USS Hermitage (LSD-34)	USS Anchorage (LSD-36)
1985	USS Casimir Pulaski (SSBN-633)	Unknown
1984	Unknown	Unknown
1983	USS Biddle (CG-34)	USS Reasoner (FF-1063) (estimated from ref)
1982	USS Wainwright (CG-28)	Unknown
1981	USS Iwo Jima (LPH-2) (2nd Award)	USS Hoel (DDG-13)
1980	USS Saratoga (CV-60)	USS Ranger (CV-61) (2nd Award)
1979	Unknown	Unknown
1978	USS Truett (FF-1095)	Helicopter Sea Combat Squadron Four (HSC-4)
1977	Unknown	USS Ponchatoula (AO-148)
1976	Reconnaissance Attack (Heavy) Squadron One (RVAH-1)	USS Tripoli (LPH-10)
1975	USS Barry (DD-933)	USS Fresno (LST-1182)
1974	Unknown	USS Buchanan (DDG-14)
1973	Unknown	Attack Squadron 153 (VA-153)
1972	USS Iwo Jima (LPH-2)	USS Chicago (CA-136)
1971	USS Tullibee (SSN-597)	Unknown
1970	USS Dash (MSO-428)	USS Hancock (CVA-19)
1969	USS Wrangell (AE-12)	USS Plunger (SSN-595)
1968	USS Blandy (DD-943)	USS Frank Knox (DD-742)
1967	USS Shangri-La (CVA-38)	USS Ashtabula (AO-51)
1966	USS York County (LST-1175)	USS Ranger (CV-61)
1965	USS Davis (DD-937)	USS Cook (APD-130)
1964	USS Parrot (MSC-197)	USS Cree (ATF-84)
1963	USS Tirante (SS-420)	Patrol Squadron 22 (VP-22)
1962	USS Vesole (DD-878)	USS Forster (DER-334)
