= S1C =

S1C may refer to:

- S-1C, a variant of the Pitts Special, biplane
- S-IC, the first stage of the Saturn V rocket
- S1C reactor, United States Navy submarine nuclear reactor
