= USS Springfield (SSN-761) =

Los Angeles-class nuclear-powered attack submarine of the US Navy

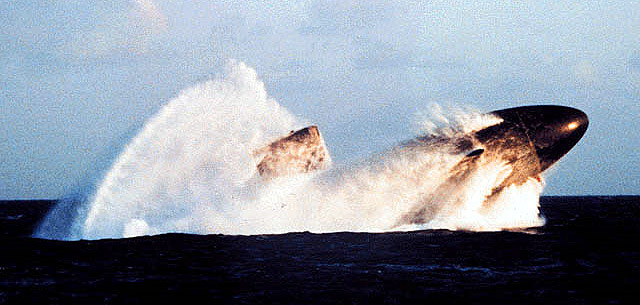
- USS Springfield (SSN-761)

History

United States
- Namesake: The Cities of Springfield, Illinois and Springfield, Massachusetts
- Awarded: 21 March 1986
- Builder: General Dynamics Electric Boat
- Laid down: 29 January 1990
- Launched: 4 January 1992
- Sponsored by: Lynn Morley Martin
- Commissioned: 9 January 1993
- Home port: Naval Base Point Loma
- Motto: United for Freedom, Ready for War
- Status: in active service
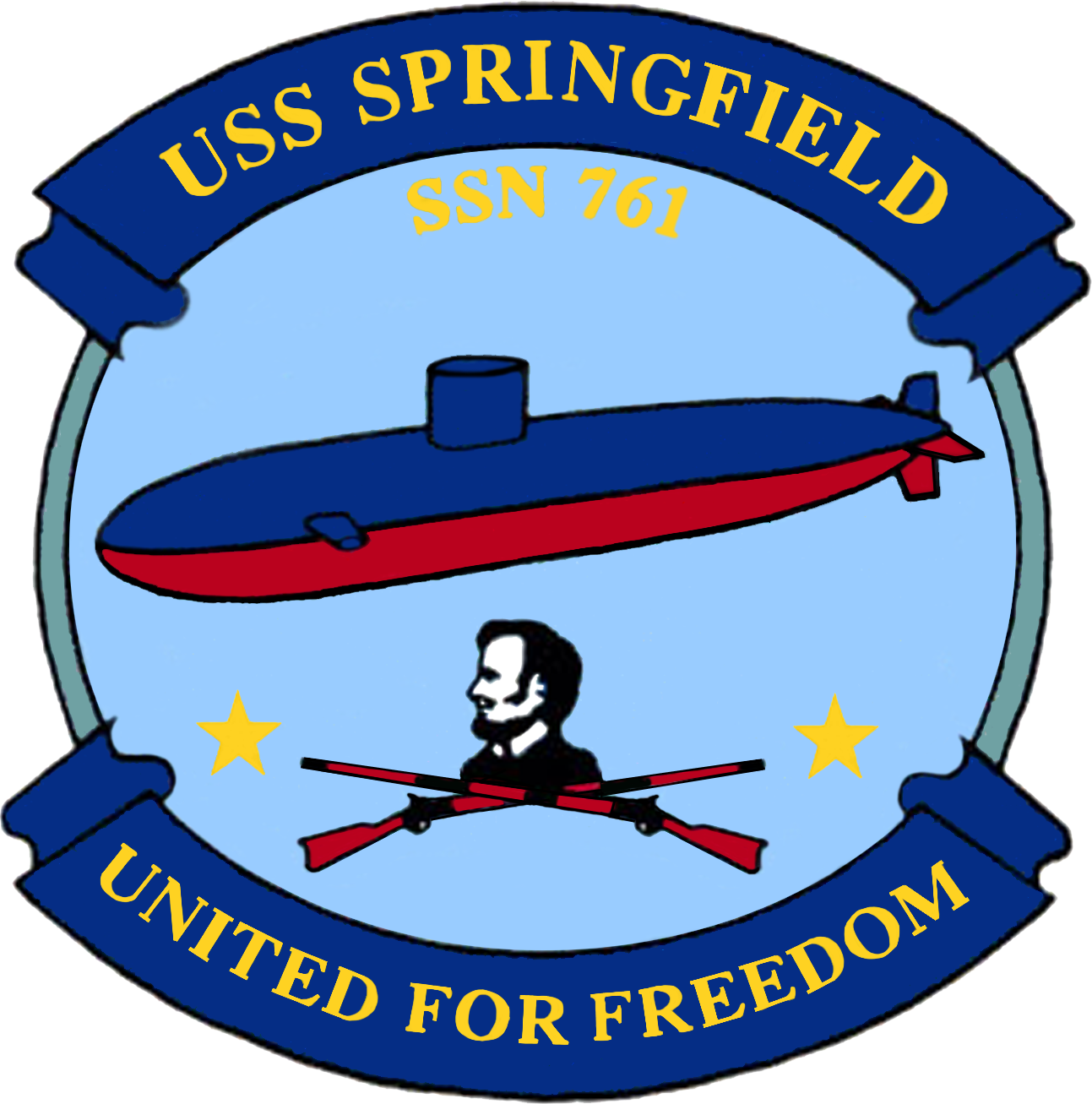
- Badge

General characteristics
- Class & type: Los Angeles-class submarine
- Displacement: 6,000 long tons (6,096 t) light; 6,927 long tons (7,038 t) full; 927 long tons (942 t) dead
- Length: 110.3 m (361 ft 11 in)
- Beam: 10 m (32 ft 10 in)
- Draft: 9.4 m (30 ft 10 in)
- Propulsion: 1 × S6G PWR nuclear reactor with D2W core (165 MW), HEU 93.5%; 2 × steam turbines (33,500) shp; 1 × shaft; 1 × secondary propulsion motor 325 hp (242 kW)
- Speed: Surfaced:20 knots (23 mph; 37 km/h); Submerged: +20 knots (23 mph; 37 km/h) (official)
- Complement: 12 officers, 98 men
- Armament: 4 × 21 in (533 mm) bow tubes; 10 × Mk48 ADCAP torpedo reloads; Tomahawk land attack missile block 3 SLCM range 1,700 nautical miles (3,100 km); Harpoon anti–surface ship missile range 70 nautical miles (130 km); mine laying Mk67 mobile Mk60 captor mines

USS Springfield (SSN-761), a Los Angeles-class submarine, is the fourth ship of the United States Navy to bear the name. The boat was named in honor of both the cities of Springfield, Illinois and Springfield, Massachusetts.

The contract to build her was awarded to the Electric Boat Division of General Dynamics Corporation in Groton, Connecticut on 21 March 1986, and her keel was laid down on 29 January 1990. She was launched on 4 January 1992 sponsored by Lynn Martin, and commissioned on 9 January 1993. Springfield is homeported at Naval Base Guam in Agana, Guam and is assigned to Submarine Squadron FIFTEEN.

In mid-2004, Springfield began an extensive overhaul, or Depot Modernization Period (DMP), at the Electric Boat shipyard in Groton. In addition to normal periodic maintenance and repairs, Springfield received extensive modernization in fire control systems, sonar processing, weapons launch systems, and communications outfit, a ring laser gyro inertial navigation system, as well as stealth improvements and engine room upgrades. The modernization was the first major overhaul and repair job for Electric Boat in almost 25 years. Originally awarded as a 12 month, $26.3 million depot modernization, Springfield was to be the test case for the possibility of awarding future repair and overhaul contracts to Electric Boat. The overhaul was plagued by cost and time overruns, and when finally completed in December 2005, it was several months late and well over budget. Electric Boat has not been awarded any DMP contracts since.

Springfield arrived at PNSY on 1 December 2016 to begin an Engineering Overhaul. Springfield will undergo planned maintenance work and system certifications primarily focused on modernizing systems associated with the boat's engine room.

Springfield transferred homeports from Pearl Harbor to Naval Base Guam on March 21, 2022.

== Awards ==
Springfield has deployed overseas on many occasions and earned several Meritorious Unit Commendations and Battle "E" Efficiency awards.

In 1998, Springfield won the Captain Edward F. Ney Silver Cup Trophy for outstanding food service (first place in the submarine category). The Ney Memorial Awards, presented annually to the top Navy galleys in ten categories, were established by the Secretary of the Navy and the International Food Service Executives Association (IFSEA) in 1958.

In 2002 the boat received the Arleigh Burke Fleet Trophy for most improved ship in the Atlantic Fleet, while under command of Commander D.P. Forney.

In 2003 the boat was awarded the Retention Excellence Award for her squadron. She has also won multiple awards for Navigation, Engineering, Medical, Supply, Damage Control and Deck Seamanship excellence in various years.
