= VP-8 =

VP-8 Tigers
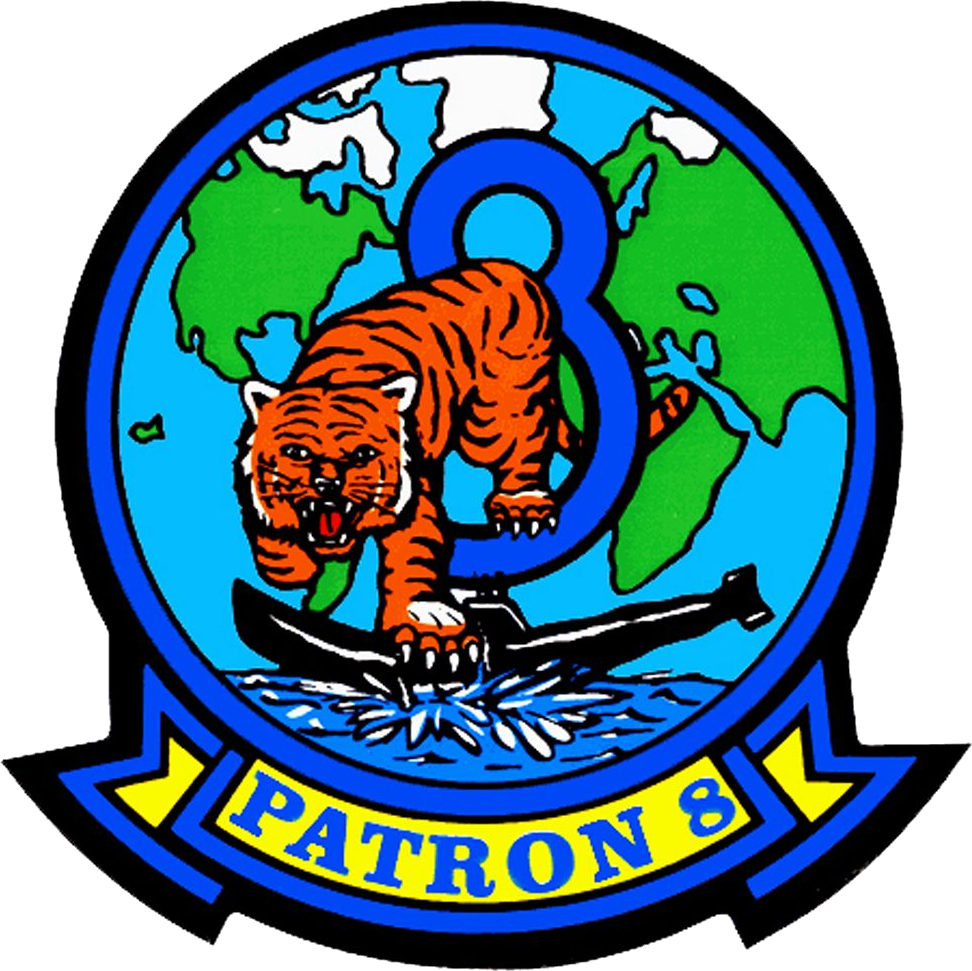
- VP-8 Unit Insignia
- Active: 1 September 1942 – Present
- Country: United States of America
- Branch: United States Navy
- Type: Squadron
- Role: Anti-Submarine Patrol
- Part of: United States Navy
- Garrison/HQ: Naval Air Station Jacksonville, Jacksonville, Florida
- Nickname: The Fighting Tigers
- Engagements: World War II; Vietnam War; Gulf War; Operation Enduring Freedom; Iraq War
- Decorations: Joint Meritorious Unit Award (2); Navy Unit Commendation (3); Meritorious Unit Commendation (7); Navy Expeditionary Medal (1); Southwest Asia Service Medal (1); Navy "E" Ribbon (9); Arleigh Burke Fleet Trophy (1)

Insignia
- Identification symbol: LC

Aircraft flown
- Patrol: PBM-3/3C/3S/5E; P2V-2/3/5F; P-3A/B/C; P-8A

Patrol Squadron Eight (VP-8) is a U.S. Navy land-based patrol squadron stationed at Naval Air Station Jacksonville, Florida (US). VP-8 is tasked to undertake maritime patrol, anti-submarine warfare (ASW), and intelligence, surveillance and reconnaissance (ISR) missions. The Squadron is equipped with the Boeing P-8A Poseidon.

The squadron was originally established as Patrol Squadron 201 (VP-201) on 1 September 1942, redesignated Patrol Bombing Squadron 201 (VPB-201) on 1 October 1944, redesignated Patrol Squadron 201 (VP-201) on 15 May 1946, redesignated Patrol Squadron, Medium Seaplane 1 (VP-MS-1) on 15 November 1946, redesignated Patrol Squadron, Medium Landplane 8 (VP-ML-8) on 5 June 1947 and redesignated Patrol Squadron 8 (VP-8) on 1 September 1948. It is the second squadron to be designated VP-8, the first VP-8 was redesignated VP-24 on 1 July 1939.

== Operational history ==
=== World War II ===
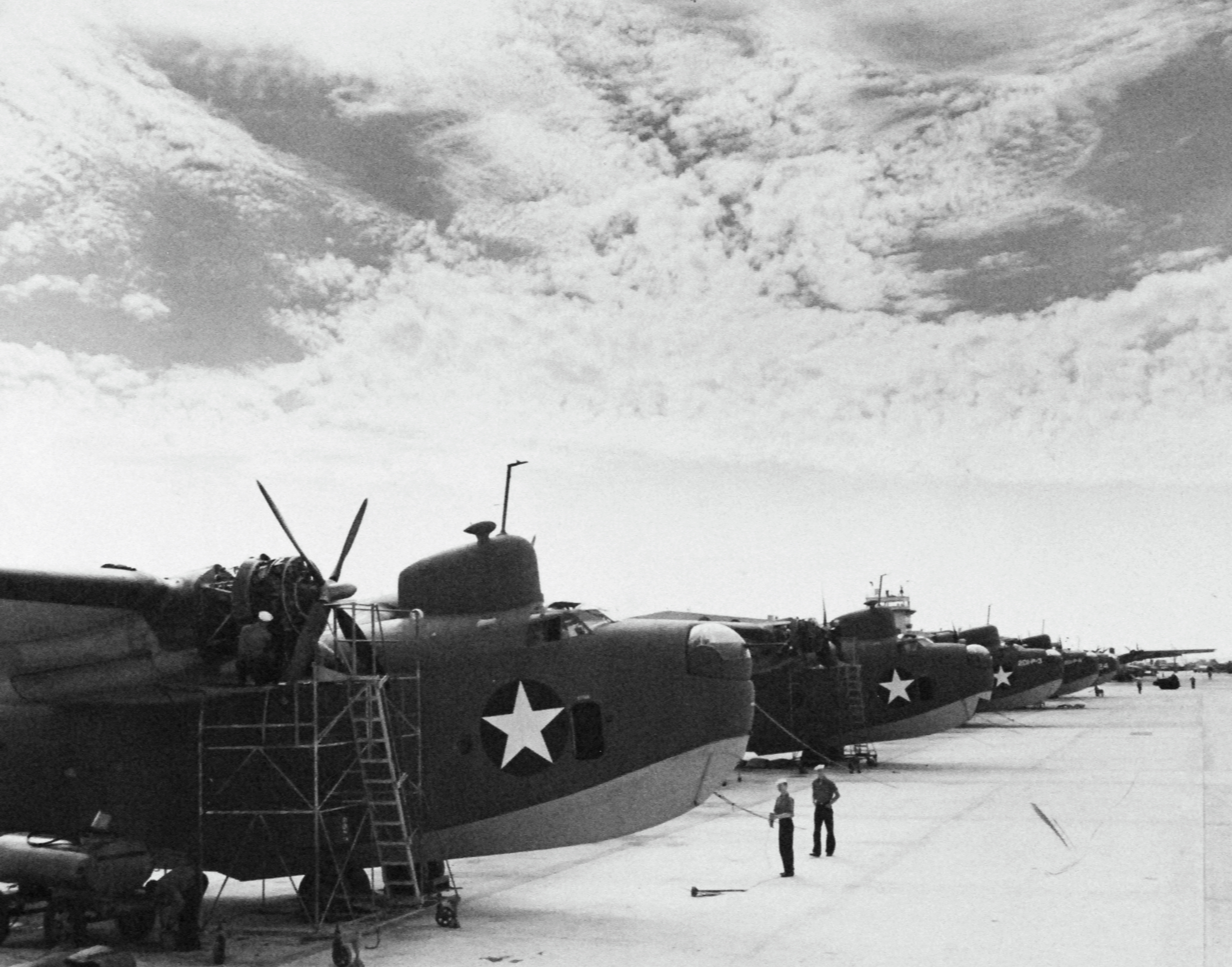
VP-201 PBM-3Cs at NAS Banana River in 1942

VP-201 was established at NAS Norfolk, Virginia on 1 September 1942, under the operational command of FAW5, flying PBM-3 Mariner seaplanes. The squadron was sent on 6 October 1942 to NAS Banana River, Florida, where most of the operational unit training was undertaken. The squadron received its own new PBM-3C aircraft on 1 December 1942.

On 6 February 1943 VP-201 returned to its home port at NAS Norfolk. Flight crew training continued concurrently with patrol operations along the Atlantic seaboard as a part of Task Force 28 in the Eastern Sea Frontier. On 27 May 1943 the squadron's PBM-3C aircraft were replaced by the newer PBM-3S with improved radar. After refitting, a six-aircraft detachment deployed to NAS Bermuda. Patrols were flown ranging out to 800 miles (1,300 km), lasting 12 to 18 hours. Convoys to and from Europe were covered in a radius of 500 miles (800 km) from Bermuda. On 9 July 1943 Lieutenant Soverel and crew attacked U-134 off Bermuda, the submarine, caught on the surface, manned its potent anti-aircraft (AA) defenses and heavily damaged the PBM-3S, forcing it to return to base. As a result of this encounter, subsequent patrols were made in pairs of aircraft. On 30 July 1943 VP-201 held a change of command at NAS Norfolk, the former commanding officer, Lieutenant Commander M. H. Tuttle, and half of the squadron personnel and assets were transferred to form the cadre of a new PB4Y-1 Liberator squadron, VB-111, the remainder of the squadron and its newly assigned personnel were transferred the next week to a new home port at NAS Bermuda under the administrative control of the Commander Bermuda Air Group. An intensive period of training ensued.

On 8 June 1944 VP-201 was transferred back to its original home port at NAS Norfolk under the administrative control of FAW-5, and assigned duties involving regular flights between Bermuda and Norfolk carrying supplies and personnel. On 12 June the squadron deployed to NAS Key West, Florida, under the operational control of FAW-12 for a two-week period of Anti-submarine warfare (ASW) refresher training. On 12 July VP-201 deployed to NAS Coco Solo, Panama Canal Zone, under the operational control of FAW-3 under the Commander Panama Sea Frontier. Upon completion of the deployment, the squadron was reassigned to a new home port at NAS Key West under control of FAW-12, on 27 July 1944. From 1 November half of the squadron's PBM-3S aircraft were outfitted with L-8C Leigh searchlights at NAS Key West. After training in use of the new British-designed equipment, the squadron was assigned routine operational flights involving ASW patrols and convoy escort.

From 1 April 1945 squadron flight crews were divided into three sections and sent in rotation to Harvey Point, North Carolina, to pick up replacement aircraft, the PBM-5. Familiarization training on the new seaplanes was conducted at Harvey Point before sending the section back to NAS Key West. On 29 May VPB-201 was transferred to a new home port at NAS Coco Solo, under the operational control of FAW-3. The squadron engaged in ASW, searchlight tactics, gunnery, bombing, and instrument training flights. Following the end of World War II, the squadron's aircraft inventory was reduced from 15 to 9 and it also experienced a reduction in personnel due to the postwar demobilization.

Deployment Duration	Wing	Base	Aircraft	Operating Area
2 May 1943 – June 1944	FAW-5	Bermuda	PBM-3S	Atlantic
12 July 1944 – 27 July 1944	FAW-3	Panama	PBM-3S	Caribbean

=== Cold War ===
==== 1946–1949 ====
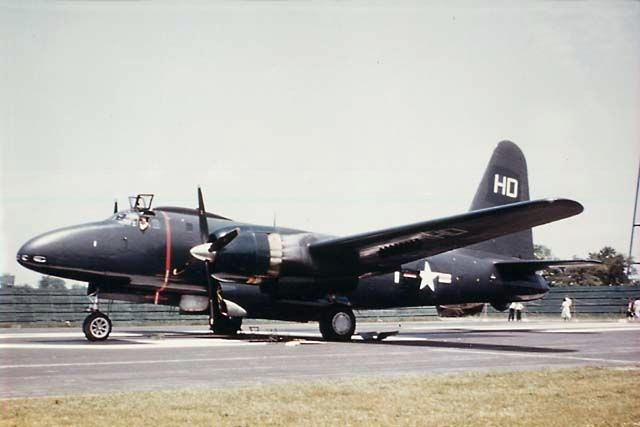
VP-8 P2V-3 in 1949.\

On 15 March 1946 VPB-201 was assigned a new home port at NS San Juan, Puerto Rico, under the operational control of FAW-11. The squadron was supported by USS San Carlos during the relocation from Panama to Puerto Rico. Upon arrival, a detachment of three aircraft was sent to NAS Trinidad to serve as part of the Air Sea Rescue Task Unit.

In December 1947 VP-ML-8 received its first contingent of replacement aircraft, the new P2V-2 Neptune. The squadron, home ported at NAS Norfolk, was under the control of FAW-5. A period of transition training commenced for the switch from seaplanes to landplanes.

On 1 March 1949 VP-8 deployed to NAS Argentia, Newfoundland. The primary emphasis during this tour of duty was the testing of the P2V aircraft in cold weather conditions, flying in temperatures as low as -55 °F. Aircrews received training in instrument and night flying and GCA landings.

Deployment Duration	Wing	Base	Aircraft	Operating Area
24 October 1945 – 31 October 1945	FAW-5	Galapagos	PBM-5	South Atlantic
1 June 1946 – 10 June 1946	FAW-1	Chaguaramas	P2V-3	Caribbean
1 May 1949 – 1 May 1949	FAW-5	Argentia	P2V3	North Atlantic

==== 1950–1959 ====
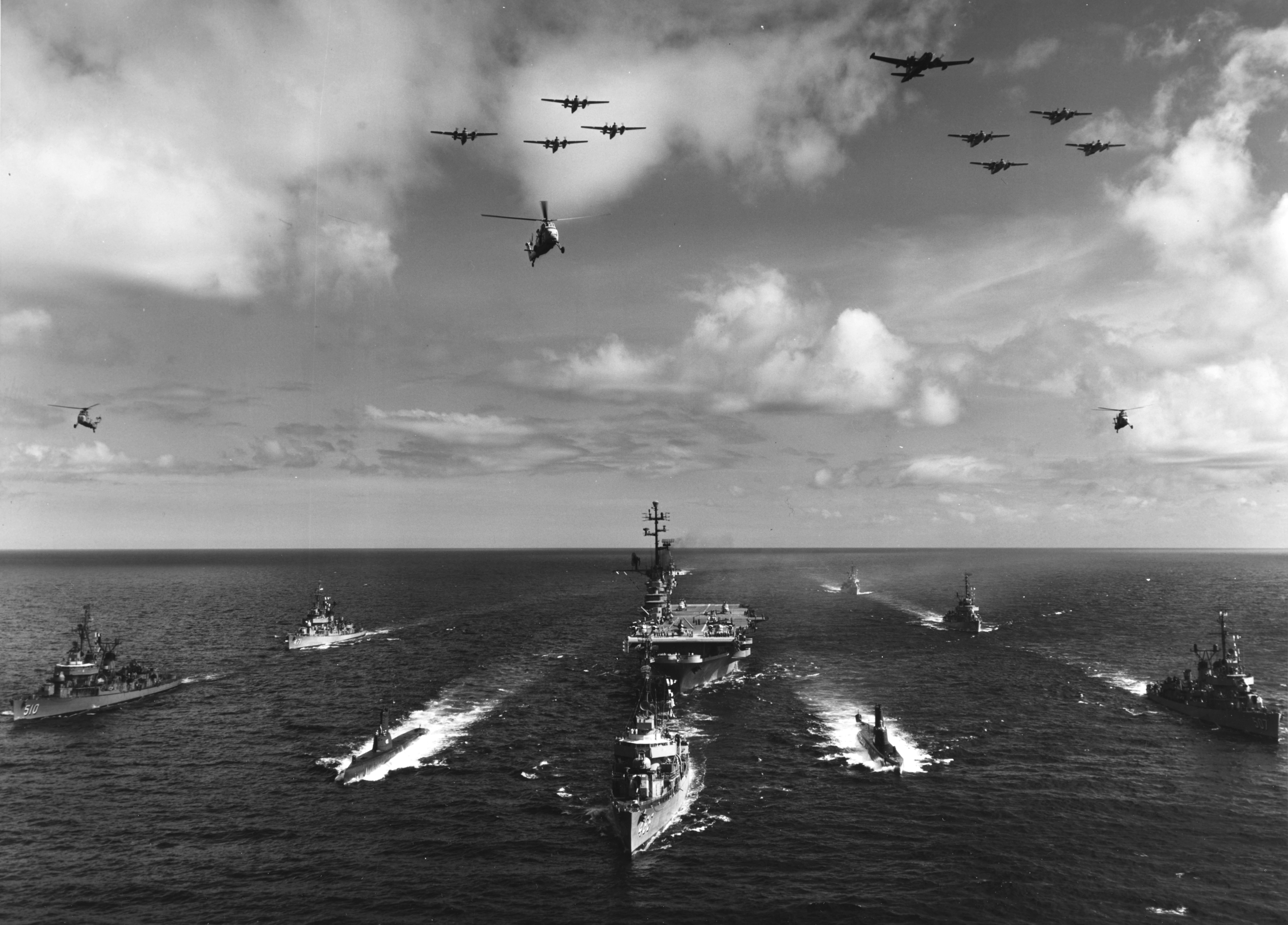
Task Force Alfa (1959)

VP-8 made its first deployment to NAS Argentia with it new P2V-5F aircraft 15 July 1955 Detachments from the squadron operated out of Goose Bay, Frobisher Bay, and Thule, Greenland, providing air cover to supply convoys for Distant Early Warning (DEW) radar installations.

In April 1958, VP-8 transferred to its new home base at Chincoteague, Virginia, and began operating with Task Force Alfa, a Hunter-Killer (HUK) group created to develop improved ASW tactics and technology by integrating carrier-based ASW aircraft, land-based patrol aircraft, refitted destroyers, and hunter-killer submarines into a single task force structure.

During the next two years, VP-8 actively participated in the evolution of antisubmarine warfare, to including the development and evaluation of new tactics and equipment.

Deployment Duration	Wing	Base	Aircraft	Operating Area
1 February 1949 – 1 April 1950	FAW-5	Argentia	P2V3	North Atlantic
22 February 1950 – 28 March 1950	FAW-5	Cuba	P2V-3	Caribbean
5 January 1952 – 20 May 1952	FAW-3	Keflavik	P2V-3	North Atlantic
December 1952 – July 1953	FAW-3	Keflavik	P2V-3	North Atlantic
1 August 1953 – January 1954	FAW-3	Keflavik	P2V-3	North Atlantic
1 April 1954 – September 1954	FAW-3	Morocco	P2V-3	Mediterranean
19 February 1955 – 4 March 1955	FAW-11	San Juan	P2V-3	Caribbean
15 July 1955 – 8 October 1955	FAW-3	Argentia	P2V-5F	North Atlantic
1 December 1955 – 10 January 1955	FAW-3	Argentia	P2V-5F	North Atlantic
31 October 1956 – 4 April 1957	FAW-3	Morocco	P2V-5F	Mediterranean
1 October 1957 – January 1957	FAW-3	Argentia	P2V-5F	North Atlantic

==== 1960–1969 ====
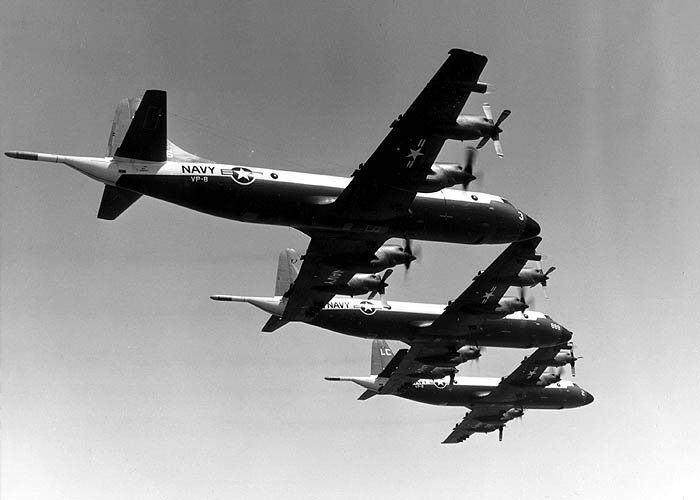
VP-8 P-3As in the original blue/white colours.

The VP-8 moved to Naval Air Station Patuxent River, Maryland in July 1961. After relinquishing the last of its P2V-5FS aircraft to the U. S. Naval Reserve in October 1962, VP-8 became the first operational P-3A Orion squadron in the U.S. Navy.

During the Cuban Missile Crisis, VP-8 sent a four-aircraft detachment to Bermuda to support the naval quarantine, including monitoring of Soviet submarines operating in the Caribbean and Eastern Atlantic. VP-8 subsequently deployed detachments to Iceland, Ireland, Newfoundland, Bermuda, and Caribbean bases.

VP-8 made the first trans-Atlantic flight by a P-3 Orion when it flew to West Malling, England, on 9 March 1963. During 1964, VP-8 participated in Fleet Exercise Steel Pike I from bases in Spain. The squadron also began its first P-3B Orion aircraft in December 1965.

VP-8 made its first deployment to the Western Pacific when it relieved VP-28 at Naval Station Sangley Point, Republic of the Philippines, on 25 May 1966. During this deployment, VP-8 carried out combat missions throughout Southeast Asia for the U.S. Seventh Fleet in support of the Vietnam War.

In May 1968, while deployed to Bermuda, VP-8 flew multiple missions in the search for the missing nuclear submarine USS Scorpion (SSN-589).

Deployment Duration	Wing	Base	Aircraft	Operating Area
31 August 1962 – December 1962	FAW-11	Cuba	P-3A	Caribbean
25 May 1966 – 2 December 1966	FAW-8	Sangley Pt.	P-3A	Western Pacific
December 1967 – 8 June 1968	FAW-5	Bermuda(3 planes Newfoundland)	P-3B	Atlantic
28 February 1969 – 28 June 1969	FAW-5	Bermuda(3 planes Newfoundland)	P-3B	Atlantic

==== 1970–1979 ====
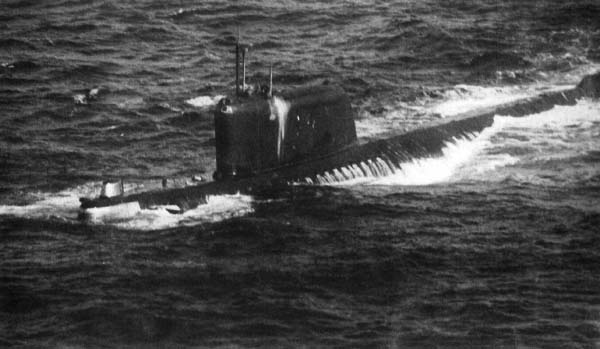
K-19

From 1969 to 1974, VP-8 made several deployments to Bermuda, and it was transferred to its current homeport at Naval Air Station Brunswick, Maine, in July 1971.

From 1 March – 2 March 1972, P-3A Orion aircraft from VP-8 maintained a constant surveillance of the stricken Soviet nuclear-powered ballistic missile submarine K-19 which had been forced to surface because of an onboard fire that broke out on 24 February.

Starting in February 1976, VP-8 closed out the decade with a number of split deployments.

The squadron suffered the loss of an aircraft and aircrew in the fall of 1978. The aircraft, on route to a Canadian airshow, suffered catastrophic engine damage about 20 minutes into the flight and crashed near Poland Springs Maine.

Deployment Duration	Wing	Base	Aircraft	Operating Area
2 March 1970 – 17 July 1970	FAW-5	Multiple	P-3A	Mediterranean
25 October 1970 – 26 February 1971	FAW-5	Multiple (split)	P-3A	Mediterranean
November 1970 – April 1971	FAW-5	Bermuda (split)	P-3A	Atlantic
November 1971 – 1 March 1972	FAW-5	Bermuda	P-3B	Atlantic
3 October 1972 – 3 November 1972	FAW-5	Rota	P3B	Mediterranean
10 January 1974 – 6 June 1974	FAW-5	Bermuda	P-3B	Atlantic
July 1975 – February 1976	PatWing-5	Rota	P-3B	Mediterranean
October 1976 – March 1977	PatWing-5	Bermuda/Lajes	P-3B	Atlantic
8 February 1978 – 8 August 1978	PatWing-5	Bermuda/Lajes	P-3B	Atlantic
July 1979 – December 1979	PatWing-5	Rota/Lajes	P-3B	Mediterranean/Atlantic

==== 1980–1991 ====
From 1980 through 1988, VP08 carried out deployments to Rota, Lajes, Bermuda, and Sigonell. Its deployment to Sigonella included VP-8 participating in numerous ASW exercises with detachments operating out of Rota, Souda Bay, Crete, and Nîmes-Garon, France.

Between 27 October – 8 December 1985, a two-aircraft detachment on rotation at Roosevelt Roads Naval Station, Puerto Rico, assisted the U.S. Coast Guard in anti-drug interdiction operation the Caribbean Sea.

Deployment Duration	Wing	Base	Aircraft	Operating Area
4 November 1980 – 12 May 1981	PatWing-5	Rota/Lajes	P-3B	Mediterranean/Atlantic
5 August 1982 – 12 January 1983	PatWing-5	Bermuda	P-3C UII.5	Atlantic
5 October 1983 – 13 March 1984	PatWing-5	Sigonella	P-3C UII.5	Mediterranean
February 1985 – 15 July 1985	PatWing-5	Rota/Lajes	P-3C UII.5	Mediterranean/Atlantic
27 October 1985 – 8 December 1985	PatWing-5	Roosevelt Roads	P-3C UII.5	Caribbean
24 May 1986 – 10 November 1986	PatWing-5	Keflavik	P-3C UII.5	North Atlantic
10 December 1987 – 10 June 1988	PatWing-5	Rota/Lajes	P-3C UII.5	Mediterranean/Atlantic
2 May 1989 – 9 November 1989	PatWing-5	Keflavik	P-3C UII.5	North Atlantic
2 December 1990 – 10 June 1991	PatWing-5	Sigonella (split)	P-3C UII.5	Mediterranean
December 1990 – 10 March 1991	PatWing-1	Jeddah (split)	P-3C UII.5	Persian Gulf

==== Operation Desert Storm ====
Starting 31 December 1990, VP-8 deployed to Jeddah, Saudi Arabia, to support carrier battle groups for Operation Desert Shield and Operation Desert Storm, as well as monitor Soviet, Libyan, and Iraqi naval units in the Mediterranean from Naval Air Station Sigonella in coordination with U.S. Sixth Fleet carrier battle groups.

=== Post-Cold War ===
==== 1992 – present ====
===== Military operations =====
In January 1996, VP-8 returned from NAS Sigonella where they flew more than 900 sorties and 6,000 hours in support of Operation Sharp Guard and Operation Decisive Endeavor.

During its 1997 deployment to NAS Sigonella, VP-8 flew over 100 missions supporting the United Nations’ peacekeeping effort in Bosnia-Herzegovina (Operation Deliberate Guard) and 42 missions in support of Operation Silver Wake resulting in the safe evacuation of 889 civilians from Albania.

During its 1998 deployment to NAF Keflavik, NS Roosevelt Roads, and Howard AFB, VP-8 conducted surface and sub-surface surveillance operations in the North Atlantic resulted in tracking 18 individual submarines from eight countries. Following its return to NAS Brunswick, VP-8 began the transition to Aircraft Improvement Program (AIP) P-3 upgrade aircraft. During its 2000 deployment, the squadron's new P-3C AIP aircraft flew over 545 missions, consisting of 5300 hours, out of NAF Sigonella in support of Operation Joint Guardian, Operation Determined Forge, and Operation Deliberate Forge.

===== Counter-narcotic operations =====
Operating out of Naval Station Roosevelt Roads between July 1992 and January 1993, VP-8 flew over 6,000 hours in support of counter-narcotic operations and Sixth Fleet operations in the Mediterranean, with several detachment stationed at Naval Station Guantanamo Bay, Naval Air Station Key West, NAS Sigonella, and Naval Air Facility Lajes.

VP-8 flew nearly 6,000 hours operating out of 18 countries during a tri-site deployment to NAF Keflavik, NS Roosevelt Roads, and Howard Air Force Base, Panama, in 1998. The squadron flew 450 surveillance missions in support of counter-narcotic operations in the Caribbean area of responsibility (AOR), resulting in 13 arrests and the seizure of 11 metric tons of illegal drugs worth US$171.4 million. Search and rescue efforts in the region accounted for 14 saved lives.

Operating in a split deployment to NAS Roosevelt Roads from August 2001 to February 2002, VP-8 was active in counter-drug operations in the Caribbean, working with the Coast Guard and U.S. Customs, which interdicted or disrupted $7.6 billion in illegal drugs, including over 28,000 kg of cocaine.

From NAF Keflavik, the squadron participated in NATO exercises, as well as undertaking new operational tasks involving homeland defense and Operation Enduring Freedom.

==== Operation Iraqi Freedom ====
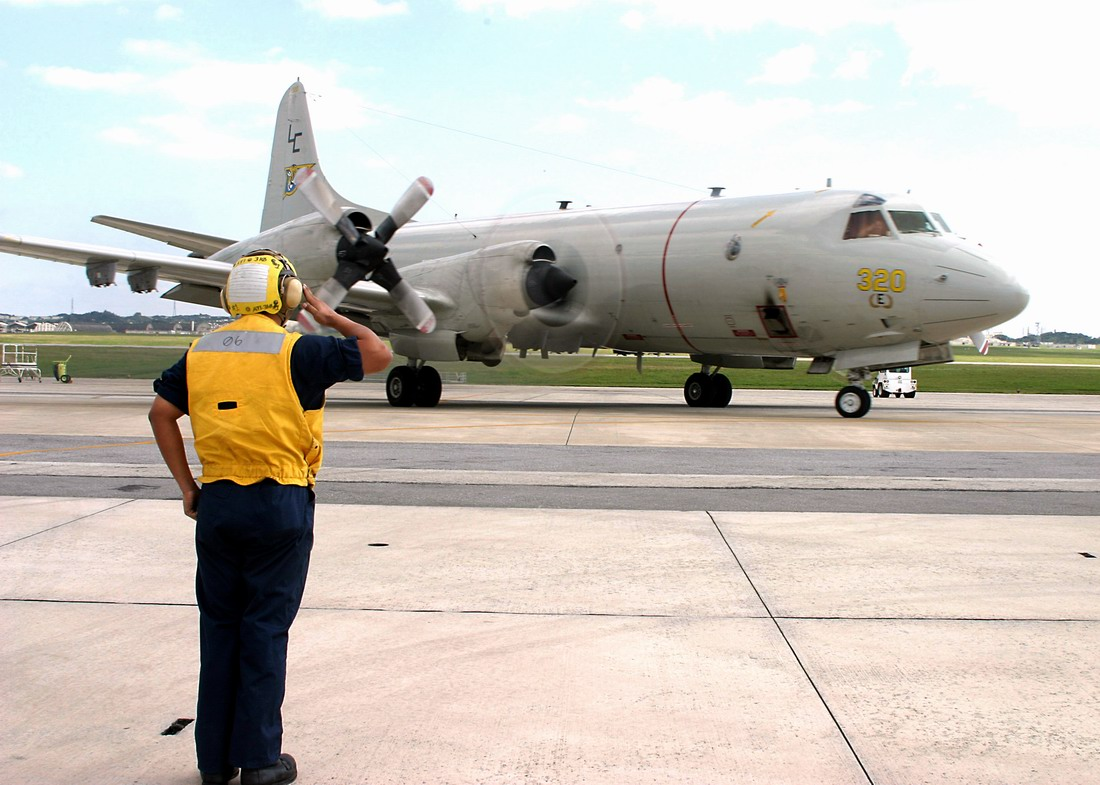
VP-8 - Operation Iraqi Freedom

From February to August 2003, VP-8 deployed to NAF Sigonella and Souda Bay, Crete, to provide 24-hour P-3 support for the two carrier battle groups in the Mediterranean during Operation Iraqi Freedom (OIF), flying nearly 100 overland combat missions and over 4,000 flight hours from Italy, Greece, Germany, Spain, and Senegal. This split-site deployment also included support to Operation Joint Guardian, Operation Deliberate Forge, Operation Enduring Freedom, and NATO Joint Command Lisbon.

Its second OIF deployment, starting December 2006, involved VP-8 operation out of Al Udeid Air Base in Qatar as part of Task Group 57.2, a maritime patrol and reconnaissance organization consisting of 22 aircrews and 21 aircraft.

==== Operation Unified Assistance ====
During its Western Pacific deployment to Misawa Air Base and Kadena Air Base, VP-8 participated in the U.S. military response to the aftermath of 2004 Indian Ocean earthquake (Operation Unified Assistance), sending the first U.S. military aircraft on station to the disaster area from to Utaphao, Thailand, and Diego Garcia, as well as flying Humanitarian Assistance/Disaster Relief (HADR) missions to the affected region.

==== P-8A Poseidon Transition ====
In July 2014 VP-8 started the transition from the P-3C to the P-8A Poseidon.

In March 2016, VP-8 began the squadron inaugural deployment of its P-8A Poseidon with a six-month deployment to Kadena AFB, Japan.

==== Japanese F-35 Crash ====
On 9 April 2019, VP-8 P-8A Poseidon's operating out of Misawa AB assist in the search of a Japan Air Self-Defense Force F-35A and its pilot, that crashed off the coast of Japan.

== Awards & Commendations ==
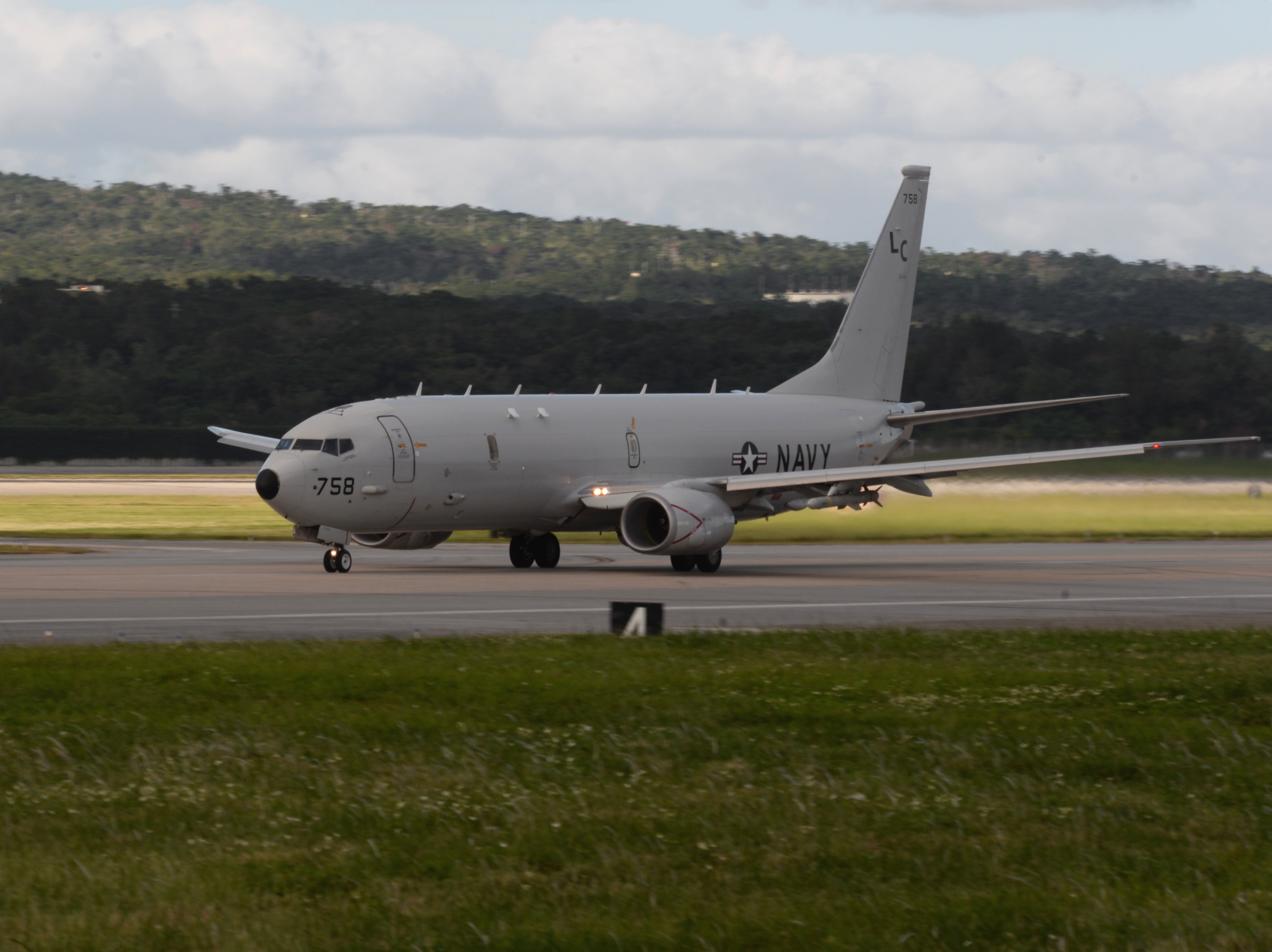
A P-8A of VP-8 takes off from Kadena Air Base, 29 November 2017

- Joint Meritorious Unit Award – 1990, 1991
- Navy Unit Commendation - 1978, 1983, 1991, 2003
- Meritorious Unit Commendation - 1970, 1971, 1977, 1979, 1983, 1986, 1997
- Navy Expeditionary Medal - 1983
- Coast Guard Unit Commendation - 1985
- Southwest Asia Service Medal - 1991
- Navy "E" Ribbon - 1950, 1960, 1962, 1983, 1991, 1997, 2000, 2007, 2014
- CINCLANTFLT Golden Anchor Award - 1995, 2005
- Isbell Trophy - 1962, 1984, 1986, 1988, 1996
- U.S. Sixth Fleet "Hook 'em" Award - 1980, 1983, 1984, 1988, 1991
- Golden Wrench Award for Maintenance - 2007, 2008, 2010, 2011, 2012
- Arleigh Burke Fleet Trophy - 2021

== Aircraft assignments ==
The squadron was assigned the following aircraft, effective on the dates shown:

- PBM-3 - September 1942
- PBM-3C - December 1942
- PBM-3S - May 1943
- PBM-5E - April 1945
- P2V-2 - December 1947
- P2V-3 - January 1949
- P2V-5F - July 1955
- P-3A - August 1962
- P-3B - December 1965
- P-3C UII - August 1981
- P-3C UII.5 - September 1985
- P-3C UIIIR - June 1994
- P-8A Poseidon - July 2014

== Home port assignments ==
The squadron was assigned to these home ports, effective on the dates shown:

- Naval Air Station Norfolk, Virginia - 1 September 1942
- NAS Banana River - 6 October 1942
- Naval Air Station Norfolk - 6 February 1943
- Naval Air Station Bermuda - August 1943
- Naval Air Station Norfolk - 8 June 1944
- Naval Air Station Key West, Florida - 27 July 1944
- Naval Air Station Coco Solo, Panama Canal Zone - 29 May 1945
- Naval Station San Juan, Puerto Rico - 15 March 1946
- Naval Air Station Norfolk - December 1947
- Naval Air Station Quonset Point, Rhode Island - September 1948
- Naval Auxiliary Air Station Chincoteague, Virginia - April 1958
- Naval Air Station Norfolk - July 1959
- Naval Air Station Patuxent River, Maryland - July 1961
- Naval Air Station Brunswick, Maine - July 1971
- Naval Air Station Jacksonville, Florida

== See also ==
- History of the United States Navy
- List of United States Navy aircraft squadrons
- List of squadrons in the Dictionary of American Naval Aviation Squadrons
- List of Lockheed P-3 Orion variants

== Sources ==
- Roberts, Michael D. (2000). "Chapter 3: Second VP-8" (PDF). Dictionary of American Naval Aviation Squadrons Volume 2. Naval Historical Center. pp. 64–73. Archived from the original (PDF) on 18 March 2003.
- "Patrol Squadron Eight History". Patrol Squadron 8 - U.S. Navy. Archived from the original on 1 July 2007.
- "VP-8 - The Fighting Tigers". Wings of Gold. Winter 2003.
