= USS Tullibee (SSN-597) =

Submarine of the United States

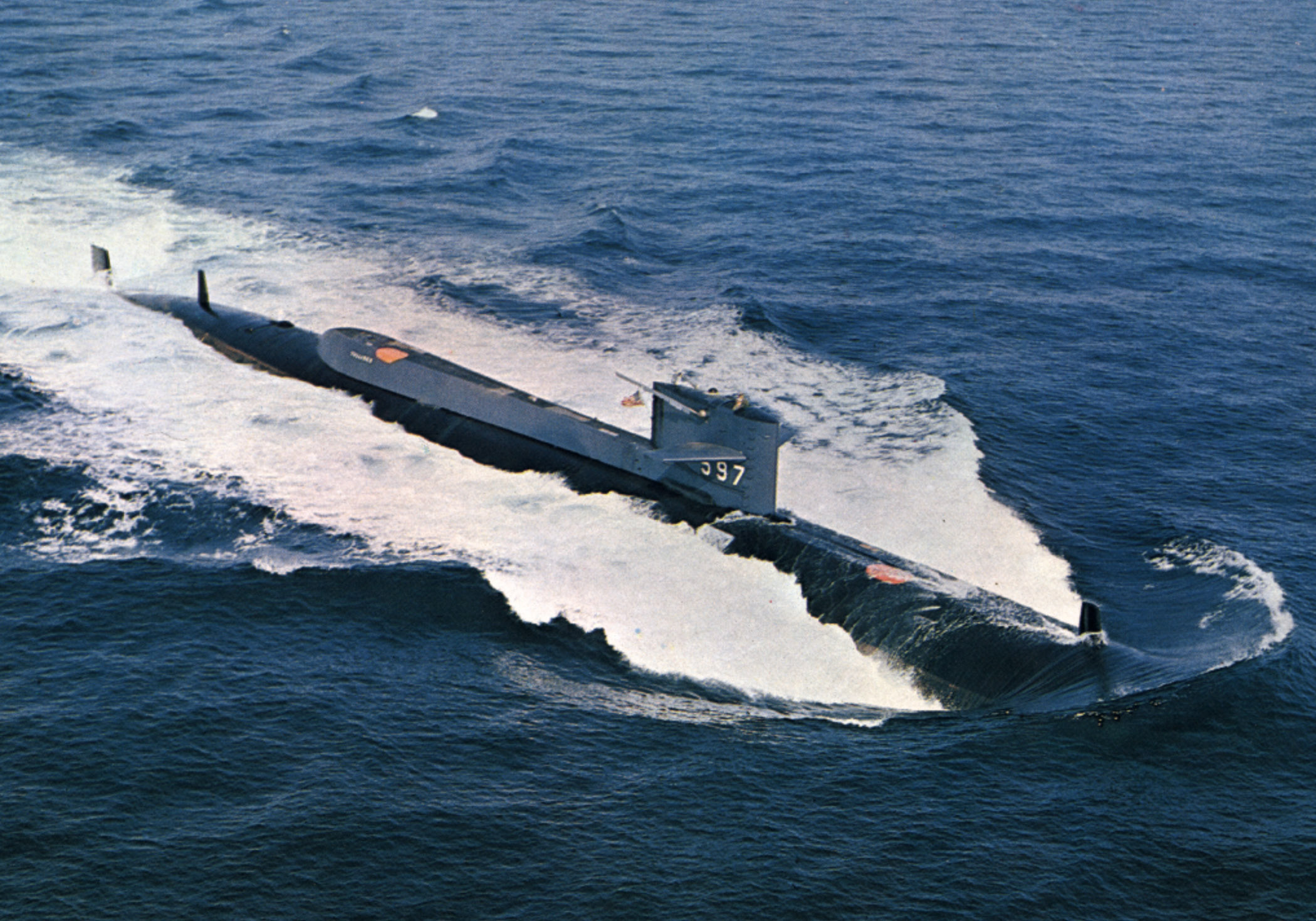
- USS Tullibee (This photo was probably taken shortly after her commissioning in 1960. The distinctive shark-fin domes are for the PUFFS sonar system).

History

United States
- Name: USS Tullibee
- Namesake: Tullibee
- Awarded: 15 November 1957
- Laid down: 26 May 1958
- Launched: 27 April 1960
- Commissioned: 9 November 1960
- Decommissioned: 25 June 1988
- Stricken: 25 June 1988
- Motto: Venator-Necator; (Latin: "Hunter-Killer")
- Fate: Entered Ship-Submarine Recycling Program, 5 January 1995

General characteristics
- Type: Nuclear submarine
- Displacement: 2,316 long tons (2,353 t) surfaced; 2,607 long tons (2,649 t) submerged
- Length: 273 ft (83 m)
- Beam: 23 ft 7 in (7.19 m)
- Draft: 21 ft (6.4 m)
- Propulsion: S2C reactor, turbo-electric, 2,500 hp (1,900 kW)
- Speed: 13 knots (24 km/h; 15 mph) surfaced; 14.8 knots (27.4 km/h; 17.0 mph) submerged
- Complement: 6 officers and 60 enlisted
- Armament: 4 × 21 in (533 mm) torpedo tubes

USS Tullibee (SSN-597), a unique submarine, was the second ship of the United States Navy to be named for the tullibee, any of several whitefishes of central and northern North America.

At 273 feet long and 2,640 tons displacement, USS Tullibee was the smallest nuclear-powered attack submarine in the US submarine fleet, although she was originally designed mainly for the anti-submarine (ASW) 'hunter-killer' role and was redesignated an attack submarine when the two roles were merged. The initial manning complement was 7 officers and 60 enlisted men. However before inactivation, the crew included 13 officers and over 100 enlisted men.

During her career, Tullibee achieved much and conducted many submarine firsts. During her commissioned service she submerged and surfaced 730 times and traveled approximately 325,000 nautical miles (602,000 km; 374,000 mi) equal to the distance from the Earth to the Moon and halfway back.

== Construction ==
Tullibee was the result of Project Nobska, a study ordered in 1956 by Admiral Arleigh Burke, then Chief of Naval Operations, from the Committee on Undersea Warfare of the National Academy of Sciences. That report emphasized the need for deeper-diving, ultraquiet submarine designs using long-range sonar to accomplish the anti-submarine (ASW) 'hunter-killer' mission. Tullibee incorporated three design innovations inspired by Project Nobska. First, it incorporated the first bow-mounted spherical sonar array. This required the second innovation: angled torpedo tubes amidships. Thirdly, Tullibee was propelled by a very quiet turbo-electric transmission powered by a S2C reactor and producing 2,500 shp (~1,900 kW).

The contract to build Tullibee was awarded to the Electric Boat Division of the General Dynamics Corporation on 15 November 1957. Her keel was laid down in Groton, Connecticut, on 26 May 1958. She was launched on 27 April 1960, sponsored by Mrs. John F. Davidson, the widow of Commander Charles F. Brindupke, CO of USS Tullibee (SS-284) when it was lost on 26 March 1944, and commissioned on 9 November 1960, with Commander Richard E. Jortberg in command.

While Tullibee was very successful from a technology perspective, she was not repeated on cost-effective grounds. Tullibee's unexpected high cost of construction coupled with her intentionally inferior overall performance compared with the contemporary Thresher attack submarine convinced the Navy to abandon the specialized hunter-killer submarine concept and assign the hunter-killer role to the attack submarines. The Navy then attempted to scale up the Tullibee engineering plant to make it suitable for a full-sized attack submarine, but the result - the Glenard P. Lipscomb - was also judged to be not completely successful and was not repeated.

== Operational history ==
=== 1961–1968 ===
Following her shakedown in January 1961, Tullibee engaged in sonar evaluations and nuclear submarine tactical exercises with Submarine Development Group 2, operating out of Naval Submarine Base New London, Connecticut, into 1963. During this period, the ship visited Bermuda on several occasions, as well as San Juan, Puerto Rico.

In July 1964, Tullibee participated in fleet exercises in anti-submarine warfare (ASW) tactics with NATO units. The submarine resumed developmental work in 1965 and operated in this capacity into the autumn of that year. On 28 October her home port was temporarily changed to Portsmouth, New Hampshire, when the ship entered the Portsmouth Naval Shipyard in Kittery, Maine, for an extensive overhaul. She remained in drydock for 754 days (2 years and 24 days), emerging on 2 January 1968.

=== 1969–1979 ===
Shifted back to New London, Tullibee deployed to the Caribbean Sea in January 1969 following refresher training and continued developmental work during 1969 and 1970. On 1 August 1970, Tullibee departed New London, bound for the Mediterranean and the ship's first service with the Sixth Fleet. During this period, she took part in NATO and Sixth Fleet exercises and made port visits to Athens, Greece; Naples, Italy; and Rota, Spain, before returning to New London on 14 December, having traveled some 20,000 miles (30,000 km) in 135 days.

In early 1971, the submarine returned to developmental exercises once more to work on SSN tactics and also made a port visit to Cape Canaveral, Florida. Participating in a major NATO exercise in the western Atlantic, Tullibee visited Halifax, Nova Scotia, before she received the Meritorious Unit Commendation for her contingency operations in the Mediterranean Sea during the previous year (from 9 September to 31 October 1970). For the remainder of the year 1971, Tullibee operated in the western Atlantic on NATO and ASW exercises. During this period, too, Tullibee received the Arleigh Burke Fleet Trophy for significant improvement in the ship's battle efficiency and readiness for that fiscal year.

The submarine conducted regular operations with the Atlantic Fleet Submarine Force into 1974, operating off the east coast and in the Caribbean Sea. Following one Caribbean cruise in the fall of 1974, Tullibee departed New London on 28 April 1975 for her second deployment to the Sixth Fleet. After operating in the Mediterranean into the fall of that year, the submarine returned to New London in October for an extended period of upkeep.

Tullibee subsequently participated in sonar evaluation tests with British destroyer HMS Matapan (D43) in the Caribbean Sea in two separate deployments between April and June 1976, before undergoing another extended upkeep period. The submarine conducted ASW operations and local operations into the fall of 1976. In October 1976, the ship received the "Golden Anchor" Award from the Commander in Chief, U. S. Atlantic Fleet (CINCLANTFLT), for meritorious retention. She departed New London on 12 November for her third Mediterranean deployment attached to the SIXTH Fleet. Tullibee conducted several significant SIXTH Fleet operations and participated in key NATO exercises. Her excellence in the area of anti-submarine warfare during this patrol was acknowledged by the Commander U.S. SIXTH Fleet of the prestigious "HOOK 'EM" Award for ASW Excellence in the spring of 1977. She returned to her home port on 24 April 1977 and during the remainder of the year, Tullibee underwent three upkeep periods interspersed with ASW exercises off the east coast of the United States. The early months of 1978 were spent in preparation for her fourth Mediterranean deployment. Departing New London in March, the submarine conducted operations with various units of the Sixth Fleet. The deployment was marred somewhat by a propulsion casualty which necessitated a two-month repair period spent at Rota, Spain. Tullibee returned to New London on 30 August. Operations out of that port took Tullibee into 1979.

=== 1979–1987 ===
On 24 July 1979, Commander Daniel J. Koczur relieved as the eighth Commanding Officer. During August 1979, Tullibee entered Portsmouth Naval Shipyard for its third and final major overhaul. This overhaul lasted until October 1982 (a total of 39 months). After leaving the shipyard, the remaining months of 1982 were spent conducting various operations, which provided refresher training for the crew.

On 26 April 1983, Commander David W. Candler relieved as the ninth Commanding Officer. On two occasions between April 1983 and February 1984 difficulties with the propulsion system required the ship to return to New London for repairs where she was reclassified as Building 597. In November 1985, the ship departed New London for her fifth and final extended deployment to the Mediterranean Sea. While deployed she conducted several ASW operations for Commander Sixth Fleet and participated in a major NATO ASW exercise. Tullibee's assignment to the Sixth Fleet during freedom of navigation exercises, involving combat with Libyan forces, resulted in her crew receiving a Navy Expeditionary Medal as well as her first award of a Navy Unit Commendation. The ship returned to New London, Connecticut, in April 1986 after having spent five months deployed.

In November 1986, Commander Charles R. Skolds relieved as the tenth Commanding Officer. The ship remained pier side in New London for the rest of 1986 and most of 1987 while preparing for inactivation. In September 1987 the ship was towed to Portsmouth Naval Shipyard to begin a ten-month inactivation and decommissioning.

== Final disposition ==
Decommissioned and stricken from the Naval Vessel Register on 25 June 1988, ex-Tullibee entered the Navy's Nuclear Powered Ship and Submarine Recycling Program on 5 January 1995. Recycling was completed on 1 April 1996. One of the fairwater planes from the Tullibee can be seen as part of a permanent art installation at Magnuson Park on the shore of Lake Washington in Seattle.

== See also ==
Other submarines with features first seen in Tullibee

- USS Thresher (SSN-593) and successors - spherical bow sonar, angled midship torpedo tubes
- USS Glenard P. Lipscomb (SSN-685) - turbo-electric drive

Other submarines with unique silencing features

- USS Jack (SSN-605) - contra-rotating screws
- USS Narwhal (SSN-671) - natural circulation reactor, scoop seawater injection for the main condensers, direct drive turbine
- USS Glenard P. Lipscomb (SSN-685) - turbo-electric drive
