= S1C reactor =

Prototype naval reactor

Coordinates: 41°53′17.00″N 72°42′44.00″W

The S1C reactor was a prototype naval reactor designed for the United States Navy to provide electricity generation and propulsion on warships. The S1C designation stands for:

- S = Submarine platform
- 1 = First generation core designed by the contractor
- C = Combustion Engineering (C-E) was the contracted designer

== History ==
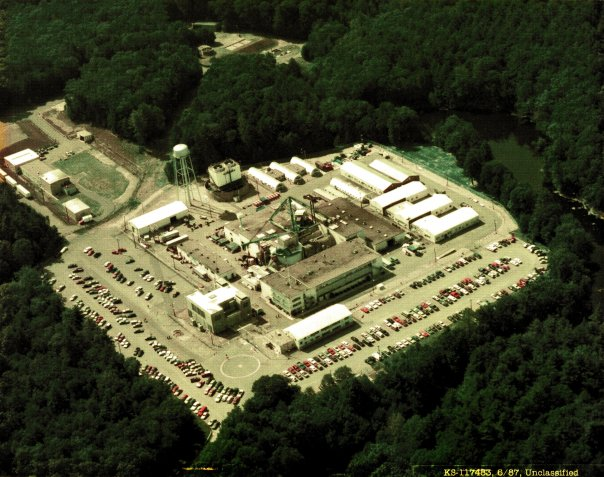
Windsor Site in June 1987

This nuclear reactor was built in Windsor, Connecticut as a prototype for the experimental USS Tullibee (SSN-597) submarine, though that boat was in fact powered by a S2C reactor. Unusual for a nuclear submarine propulsion plant, steam turbines powered generators, which in turn powered an electric motor. This eliminated the need for reduction gears and their associated underwater noise. The USS Tullibee was an early advanced-design, fast-attack submarine constructed by Electric Boat and commissioned in 1960.

Throughout the Cold War, the S1C Prototype nuclear submarine propulsion plant at the Windsor Site (41°52'44"N 72°43'03"W) supported the submarines and surface ships of the Navy’s nuclear fleet by testing new equipment and training Naval propulsion plant operators. S1C was the prototype for the USS Tullibee. The S1C Prototype was operated at the Windsor Site from 1959 until 1993. During that time, over 14,000 Naval operators were trained there, including Admiral Kirkland H. Donald early in his career.

The Windsor site was located at 1000 Prospect Hill Rd. (the address was later changed to 2000 Day Hill Road) on a 530-acre tract purchased by Combustion Engineering in 1955.

Full remediation of the S1C site was declared to be complete by the Connecticut Department of Environmental Protection in 2006. Remediation of the site was undertaken by Knolls Atomic Power Laboratory (KAPL), based out of Schenectady, New York. KAPL had taken over operation of the S1C site in the 1970s after expiration of the Navy's original contract with C-E.

The reactor was situated on land and known as the S1C Nuclear Power Training Unit (NPTU). Regarding its size and electric drive, the system layout was different than the S5W reactor used in most nuclear-powered submarines at the time. The prototype and ship had four turbine generators (2 for DC power for propulsion and 2 for AC voltage) and banked rod control. There was only two levels in the engineering spaces and the electrical operator operated out in the engineering spaces unlike S5W or later submarines.
