= HMS Matapan =

Battle-class destroyer

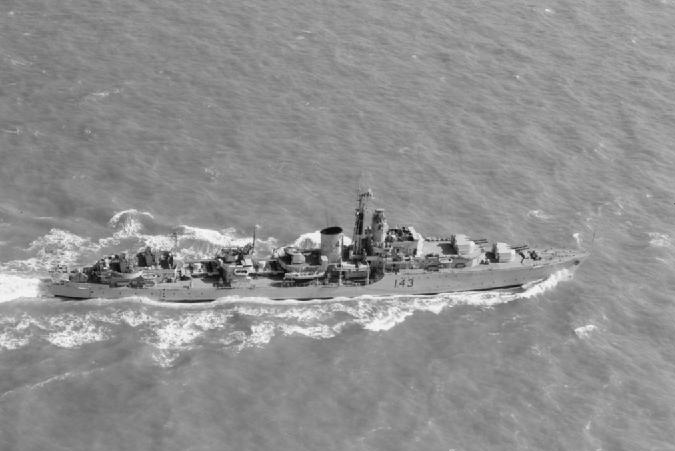
- Matapan just after completion, 1947

History

United Kingdom
- Name: HMS Matapan
- Ordered: 1943
- Builder: John Brown & Company
- Yard number: 616
- Laid down: 11 March 1943
- Launched: 30 April 1945
- Commissioned: 5 September 1947
- Decommissioned: 1977
- Reclassified: Sonar trials ship, 1973
- Fate: Broken up 1979

General characteristics
- Class & type: Battle-class destroyer
- Displacement: 2,480 tons standard; 3,835 tons post 1973 conversion
- Length: 379 ft (116 m)
- Beam: 40 ft 6 in (12.34 m)
- Draught: 12 ft 8 in (3.86 m) mean, 17 ft 6 in (5.33 m) max; increasing to 22 ft 0 in (6.71 m) post 1973 conversion
- Propulsion: Oil-fired, two three-drum boilers; Parsons geared turbines, twin screws; 50,000 hp (37,285 kW)
- Speed: 35.75 knots (66.21 km/h)
- Complement: 268
- Sensors & processing systems: Post 1973 conversion; Type 978 surface search & navigation radar; Type 944M(2) IFF Interrogation antenna; Type 2016 active/passive search & track hull sonar; Type 162M active bottom profiler sonar
- Armament: 5 × 4.5 in (114 mm) gun; 8 × Bofors 40 mm guns; 10 × 21 in (533 mm) torpedo tubes; 2 × Squid mortar
- Notes: All armament was removed during the conversion to sonar trials ship

Service record
- Part of: Admiralty Underwater Weapons Establishment
- Commanders: Lt Cdr.D.E. Holloway, January 1970-May 1972.; Cdr.W.H.H. McLeod, May 1972-unknown.; Cdr.R.E. Hoskin, unknown-June 1974.; Lt Cdr.D.J.Leach (Acting) October 1974-January 1975.; Cdr.R.E. Hoskin, January 1975-August 1976.; Cdr.R.G. Evans, August 1976-August 1977.

HMS Matapan (D43) was a later or 1943 Battle-class fleet destroyer of the Royal Navy (RN). She was named after the Battle of Cape Matapan between the Royal Navy and the Regia Marina, which ended in a decisive victory for the RN force, resulting in the destruction of three cruisers and two destroyers of the Italian Navy and was a heavy blow to the Italians. So far, she has been the only ship of the Royal Navy to bear that name.

She was placed in reserve on completion of her sea trials and would remain in such a state for a lengthy period of time, ultimately seeing service in the 1970s as a sonar trials ship. In the process she outlived all her fleetmates in Royal Navy service.

== Operational history ==
=== Completion and reserve ===
Matapan was built by John Brown & Company. She was launched on 30 April 1945 and finally completed on 5 September 1947.

The ship undertook her builders and acceptance sea trials over a period of two weeks, during which she steamed for a total of 150 hours, arriving at Chatham on 22 September, where she was de-stored. Matapan was initially laid up in Gillingham Reach on the River Medway from 28 October 1947 and was subsequently towed to Devonport on 20 July 1948, where she was prepared for preservation in long-term reserve. She was to remain moored in the River Tamar for the next 20 years.

=== Conversion to Sonar Trials Ship ===
In 1961 Matapan was first earmarked for conversion to a sonar trials ship, to replace Verulam. It appears that lack of money to pay for the necessary work, may be the reason why this was delayed for so long.

Advances in Soviet nuclear submarine performance during the 1960s rendered the existing NATO sonar equipment, which were based on analogue technology of World War II origin and had limited range, obsolescent. In 1968 the Admiralty issued a draft Staff Requirement for the Type 2016 hull sonar, which was intended to replace not only the widely used Type 184, but other types of specialist sonars, such as the Types 170, 176 and 177. Type 2016 had an effective range of up to 20,000 yd (18,000 m) in calm conditions in coastal waters, and up to 8,000 yd (7,300 m) in deep water, compared to 2,500 yd (2,300 m) for the Type 177. It used pre-formed digital beams at lower frequencies than previous types, that could track many more targets, whilst using fewer ratings to process the information. The drawback of the use of much lower frequencies however, was the need for a much longer array. The urgency of the need led to the plan to convert Matapan being revived, as a test bed for the new equipment.

On 5 January 1970, Matapan was towed to Portsmouth where she began her conversion, that resulted in her appearance becoming radically different from when she was launched in 1945. To house the 150 ft (46 m) x 10 ft (3.0 m) arrays required on either side of the keel, required the addition of a deep skeg on the bottom of her hull, which would increase her draught to 22 ft (6.7 m) and increase her displacement to 3835 tons. Additionally, a large bulbous sonar dome was added below the bow as the tip of her skeg which resulted in a long overhang of the bow and forecastle, to allow her anchors to fall free without damaging the bulbous bow dome.

The large sidescan sonar on her Starboard side had multiple digital fixed beams projecting at 90 degrees from the ships heading, meaning the ship itself had to be turned to move the aim of the sonar beams. Operating this sonar on full power caused an enormous amount of noise below the ships waterline where the hull was covered in absorbent submarine cladding, and with all of her junior ratings accommodated below the waterline aft of the engine rooms, regular sound measurements had to be taken for the crews safety. The ships armament was removed and a new deckhouse and covered bridge were added forward, along with a plated foremast to house additional radars. Towards the stern, the main deck was raised one deck level providing covered space for a dining room immediately aft of the Galley, bathrooms and accommodation for Senior Rates. She was fitted with a second funnel to vent the exhaust gases from the ships new main generators installed aft of the engine room, and a helicopter flight deck on a deckhouse aft. From the bridge forward, below decks was given over to scientific work spaces and sonar electronic compartments, with the main sonar test suite utilising a recently developed ADAWS combat system tactical display taken from ASWE to display the sonar beams. The ship was DC power from launch so was also re-wired and fitted with additional generators and AC power supplies, including a large flywheel generator to supplement the additional power demands of the sonar system. The ships operations room was reduced to just a plotting table and several radar displays for safety plots and helicopter control whilst additional accommodation for civilian scientific staff was installed including cabins below the flight deck. The reconstruction work was completed in July 1972 and she began her sea trials.

=== Service as Sonar Trials Ship 1973–1977 ===
Upon completion of her sea trials, Matapan entered active service for the very first time, commissioned on 2 February 1973, joining the Admiralty Underwater Weapons Establishment (AUWE), based in Portland. Her trials were conducted initially in British coastal waters, where the trials and testing operators found that their new equipment was very loud and required the use of ear defenders forward and below the waterline.The sonar was not allowed to be operated within 15 miles of the coast, whilst her raised height, deep draught and slab sides meant she proved difficult to manoeuvre below 5 knots in any wind. Despite adding almost 1400 tons to her weight and with her additional draught, on full power trials across a measured mile in late 1975 she still achieved 31.5 knots.

During 1976 she operated in the Atlantic and Caribbean, undertaking trials with the United States Navy, including operating with the submarine, USS Tullibee with the primary aim being to gather data on marine and submarine sonar echoes to allow both the US Navy and the Royal Navy to develop and gather data for their next generation of computer controlled sonars, as part of the RN 2016 sonar programme. Typically the submarine was positioned between 12 to 20 miles on Matapan’s Starboard beam at 90 degrees to the ships course, towing an Oropesa float on 600ft of towing cable, with a Barrage Balloon tied and flying some 100ft above the float. This allowed the submarines position to be seen visually from the ships bridge, to ensure the ships course was altered to keep the submarine at 90 degrees to Matapan who carried a stock of Helium and Balloons which could be inflated and flown from her flight deck before being towed along with the float, across to the submarine.

During these trials it was reported by P.O.Moore (Petty Officer, Torpedo and Anti-Submarine Instructor) that: "The crew of USS Tullibee, claimed that having our sonar ping them was like having a metal bucket on your head and someone hitting it with a sledgehammer." The trials side mounted sonar was so powerful that it could punch through different temperature water layers, and if bounced off a flat sea bottom it could be trapped oscillating between the seas surface and the bottom where it could and did detect the Tullibee at ranges in excess of 70 miles on several occasions. Such a large sonar system and transducers along with over 20 processing cabinets coupled with the amount of power needed to operate it precluded such a system from ever being fitted to an operational warship but, it showed the way for digital processing of future sonar systems.

Late in her career, Matapan also undertook testing of an alternative Towed Array Sonar, Type 2031, which offered the improved performance of the Type 2016, without the cost and space needs of the hull mounted type. The Type 2016 however, had already had a major influence on future warship evolution, as the Royal Navy's new Type 22 frigate was designed to mount the Type 2016, which resulted in a step change in hull size, in comparison to previous frigate designs, and ultimately it saw service in the larger warships of the Royal Navy, including the Invincible-class aircraft carriers and Type 42 destroyers. The towed array Type 2031 and its successor, the Type 2087, manufactured by Thales, have now become the standard equipment of the Royal Navy Type 23 frigates.

=== Final days ===
Matapan was decommissioned in August 1977 and laid up at Portsmouth. On 18 May 1979 she was sold to H.K.Vickers and was broken up at Blyth in Northumberland.

== Publications ==
- Colledge, J. J.; Warlow, Ben (2006) [1969]. Ships of the Royal Navy: The Complete Record of All Fighting Ships of the Royal Navy from the 15th Century to the Present (3rd Rev ed.). London: Chatham Publishing. ISBN 978-1-86176-281-8. OCLC 67375475.
- Hodges, Peter (1971). Battle Class Destroyers. London: Almark Publishing. ISBN 0-85524-012-1.
- Boniface, Patrick (2007). Battle Class Destroyers. Liskeard, Cornwall: Maritime Books. ISBN 978-1-904459-28-6.
- Critchley, Mike (1982). British Warships Since 1945: Part 3: Destroyers. Liskeard, Cornwall: Maritime Books. ISBN 0-9506323-9-2.
- Friedman, Norman (2006). British Destroyers & Frigates, The Second World War and After. London: Chatham Publishing. ISBN 1-86176-137-6.
