= United States Navy Regulations =

Document of the Department of the Navy

United States Navy Regulations is the principal regulatory document of the Department of the Navy (not just the United States Navy), endowed with the sanction of law, as to duty, responsibility, authority, distinctions and relationships of various officials, organizations and individuals.

Navy Regulations are issued by the secretary of the Navy, and are permanent regulations of general applicability, as opposed to other regulations that may be issued in accordance with law. The Navy Regulations serve in effect much as a vehicle of implementation of Title 10 of the United States Code as it pertains to the Naval Services. However, Navy Regulations do not take legal precedence over any order or directive issued by either the president or secretary of defense, or of an Act of Congress.

The chief of naval operations is responsible for maintaining the Navy Regulations, and for ensuring that they conform to the current needs of the Department of the Navy. Other directives issued within the Department of the Navy may not conflict with, alter or amend any provision of Navy Regulations. Any additions, changes or deletions to the U.S. Navy Regulations must be approved by the Secretary of the Navy.

== History ==
Navy Regulations began with the enactment by the Second Continental Congress of the "Rules for the Regulation of the Navy of the United Colonies" on November 28, 1775. The first issuance by the United States Government which covered this subject matter was "An Act for the Government of the Navy of the United States," enacted on March 2, 1799. This was followed the next year by "An Act for the Better Government of the Navy of the United States."

In the years preceding the American Civil War, twelve successor publications were promulgated under a number of titles by the President, the Navy Department and the Secretary of the Navy. A decision by the attorney general that the last of the pre-Civil War issuances was invalid led to the inclusion in the 1862 naval appropriations bill of a provision that "the orders, regulations, and instructions heretofore issued by the Secretary of the Navy be, and they are hereby, recognized as the regulations of the Navy Department, subject, however, to such alterations as the Secretary of the Navy may adopt, with the approbation of the President of the United States."

Thirteen editions of Navy Regulations were published in accordance with this authority (later codified as Section 1547, Revised Statutes) between 1865 and 1948. The 1973 edition of Navy Regulations was published under authority of 10 U.S.C. § 6011, which provided that "United States Navy Regulations shall be issued by the Secretary of the Navy with the approval of the President." In 1981, this provision was amended to eliminate the requirement for presidential approval.

While leaving this provision unaffected, Congress enacted the Goldwater–Nichols Department of Defense Reorganization Act of 1986 (Pub. L. 99–443), which granted each of the service secretaries the explicit authority to prescribe regulations to carry out his or her statutory functions, powers and duties.

== See also ==
- Uniform Code of Military Justice
