= Combustion Engineering =

American-based multinational company

- Type: Public (prior to acquisition)
- Industry: Engineering, power generation, nuclear technology
- Founded: 1912
- Defunct: 1990
- Fate: Acquired
- Successor: Asea Brown Boveri; Westinghouse Electric Company (nuclear business); Alstom (boiler and fossil fuel business)
- Headquarters: New York City, United States (original); Stamford, Connecticut, United States (from 1973)
- Area served: Worldwide
- Owners: Asea Brown Boveri (1990–2000)

Combustion Engineering (C-E) was a multi-national American-based engineering firm that developed nuclear steam supply power systems in the United States. Originally headquartered in New York City, C-E moved its corporate offices to Stamford, Connecticut, in 1973. C-E owned over three dozen other companies including Lummus Company, National Tank Company and the Morgan Door Company. The company was acquired by Asea Brown Boveri in early 1990. The boiler and fossil fuel businesses were purchased by Alstom in 2000, and the nuclear business was purchased by Westinghouse Electric Company also in 2000.

== History ==
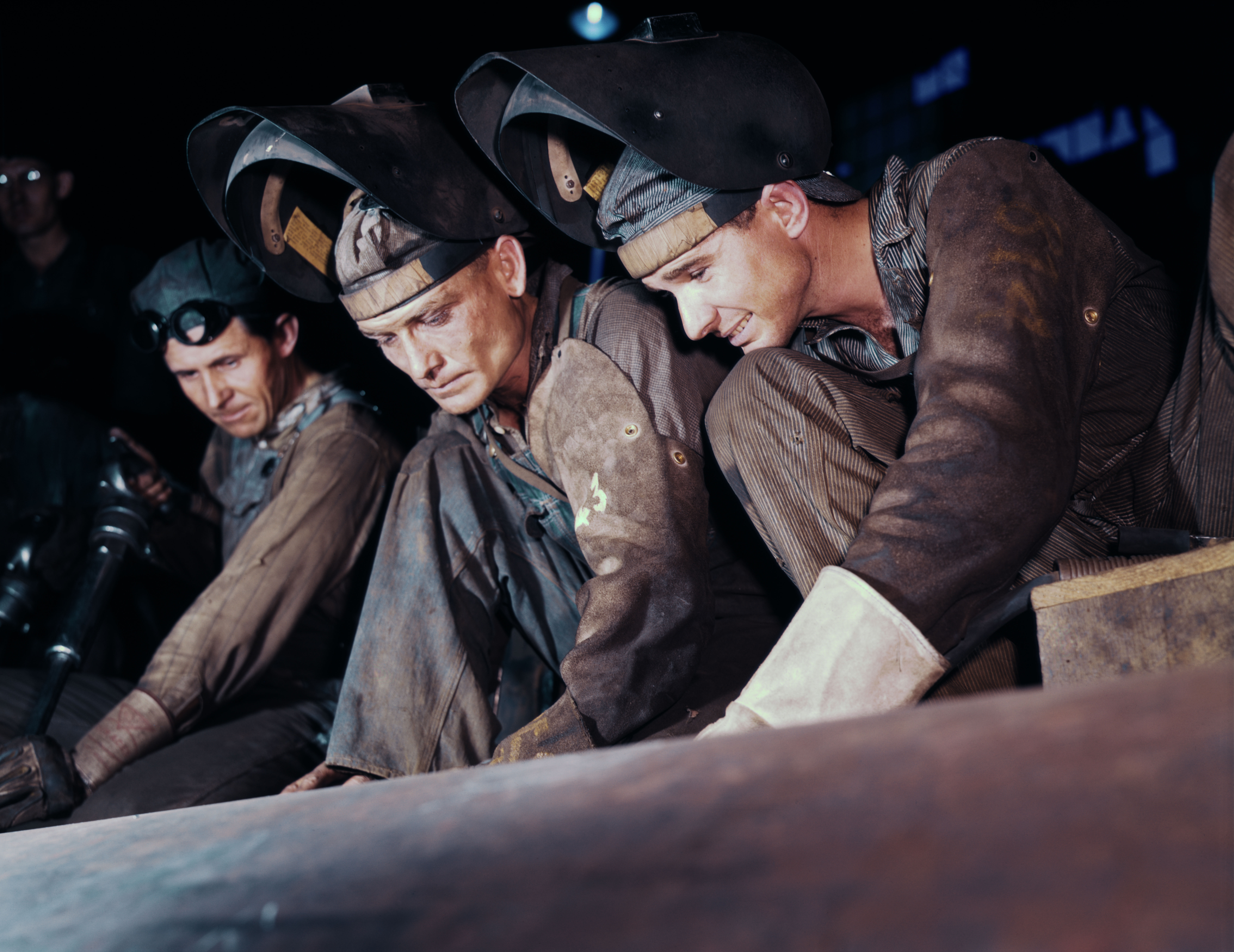
Welders making boilers for a ship, Combustion Engineering Co, Chattanooga, Tenn. (1942)

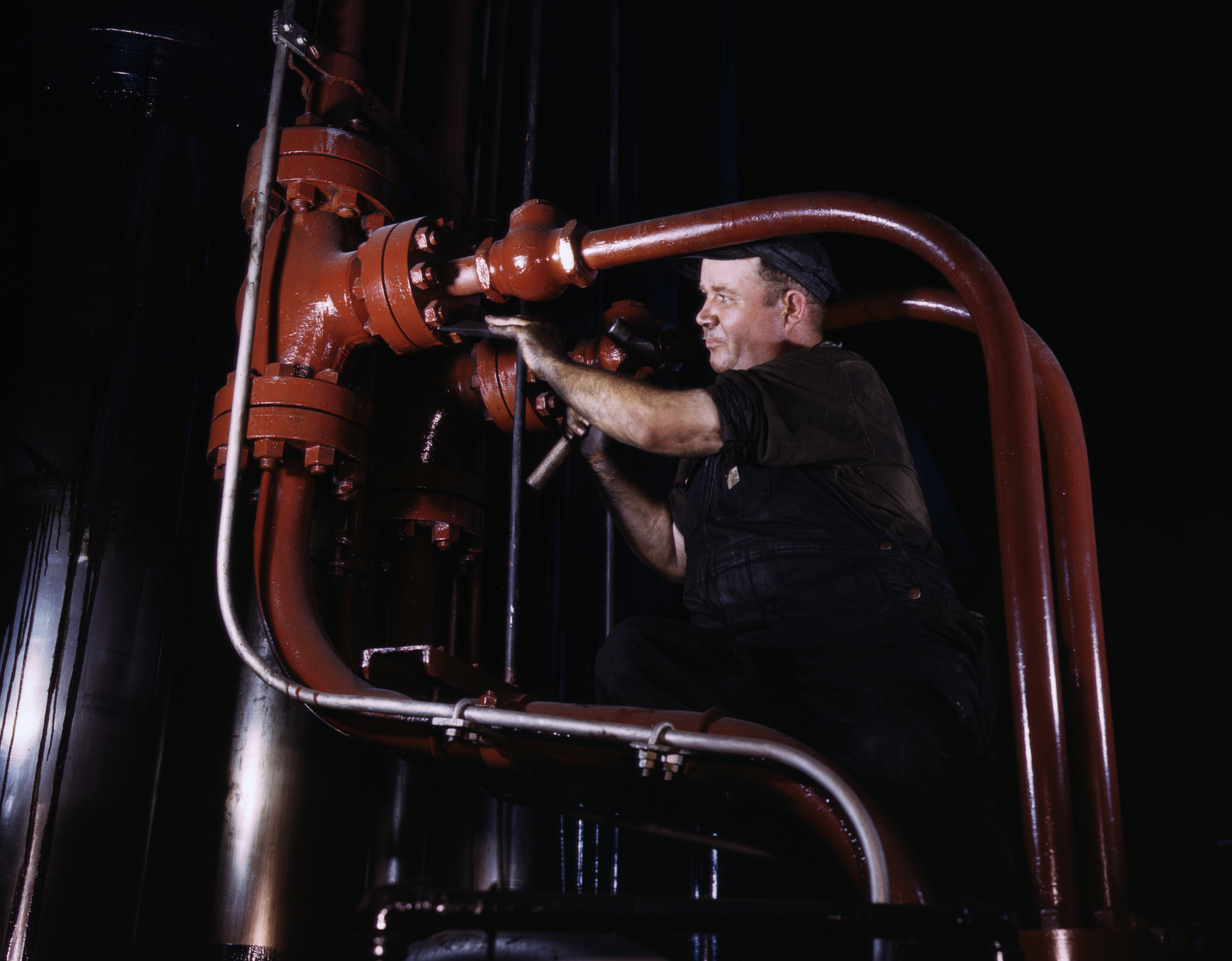
Maintenance man at the Combustion Engineering Co working at the largest cold steel hydraulic press in the world, Chattanooga, Tenn. (1942)

=== Founding ===
Combustion Engineering was organized in 1912 through the merger of the Grieve Grate Company and the American Stoker Company, two well-known manufacturers of fuel burning equipment. The company was originally headquartered on 11 Broadway and at 43 - 5 - 7 Broad Street (Manhattan), both in Lower Manhattan. The city block was leased from the Alliance Realty Company in April 1920. In May of the same year the firm began construction of an eight-story office building on the same site.

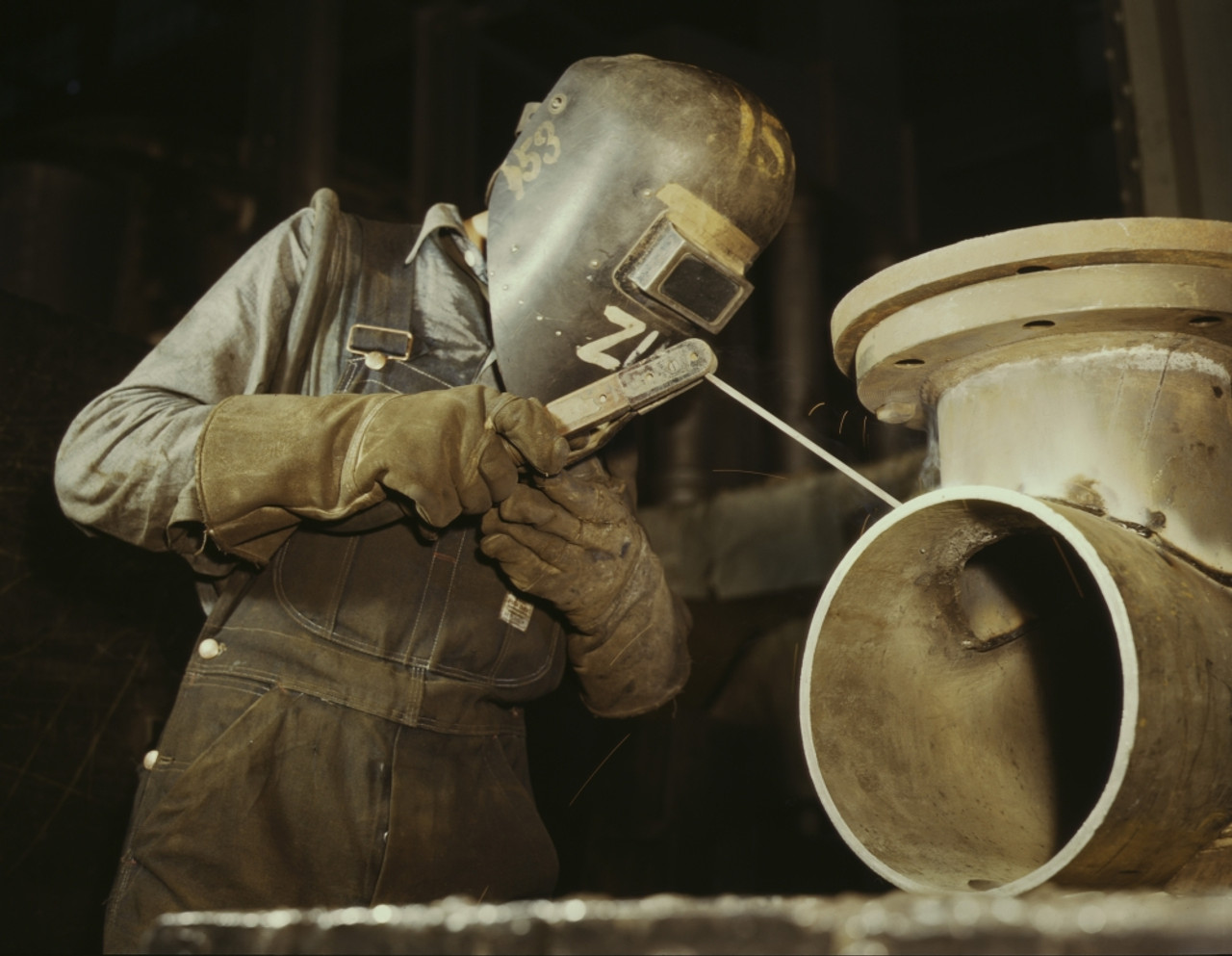

During the 1920s, C-E's signature boiler equipment was the English designed Type-E stoker. C-E also offered several other types of underfeed stokers in addition to the Type-E. During the 1920s, all of C-E's stokers were fabricated in manufacturing plants along the Monongahela River south of Pittsburgh.

In 1925 C-E entered the steam boiler business, beginning with a steam boiler installed at the Ford Motor Company's River Rouge Plant in Dearborn, MI. C-E also acquired two boiler companies in Chattanooga, TN to augment its manufacturing capabilities.

=== Merger with the Superheater Company ===
During the Great Depression, C-E formed a partnership with the Superheater Company. The Locomotive Superheater Company was founded in 1910 to further the use of superheated steam in locomotives. The Superheater Company's primary manufacturing facility was located in East Chicago, Indiana.

In December 1948 stockholders approved a merger between the Combustion Engineering Company and Superheater Company. Following consolidation the corporation was called Combustion Engineering-Superheater Inc. In September 1950 the firm announced plans to build a large high-pressure generating unit for Virginia Electric & Power Company in Chester, Virginia.

In 1953, the name Superheater was eliminated and the company took the more familiar name - Combustion Engineering, Inc. At this time, C-E primarily designed and built boiler assemblies for conventional power plants; those powered by coal and oil.

In the mid-1950s, C-E also expanded its operations into oil and gas exploration, production, refining, and petrochemicals with the acquisition of the Lummus Company located in Bloomfield, New Jersey. Lummus also supplied small industrial steam supply systems for oil field enhanced recovery.

C-E was one of the major suppliers of boilers for US Navy steam-powered warships, including Liberty ships during World War II. Amongst many other warships, most of the 46 Knox-class frigates built during the 1960s and 1970s were equipped with a 1,200-pound-per-square-inch (8,300 kPa) C-E power plant.

C-E also was a leader in the development of large coal utility steam supply systems which were used worldwide. C-E pioneered the tangential firing process used in modern large pulverized coal utility boilers. C-E maintained a large coal burning test unit at the Windsor, Connecticut site which allowed the Power Systems Group to test changes to boiler air-flow and other critical boiler design factors.

=== Nuclear steam supply systems ===
C-E's nuclear power activity began in 1955 under Arthur Santry Jr. The history of the C-E Windsor, Connecticut campus dates to the early development of the nuclear submarine. From the mid-1950s through the early 1960s, Combustion Engineering, under federal government contract, produced nuclear fuel for the US Navy's "Nuclear Navy" nuclear submarines. Also located at the Windsor site was the prototype marine nuclear propulsion training facility known as S1C, which was designed and constructed by C-E adjacent to its main campus. The S1C prototype was operated by C-E for more than ten years as an R&D and Naval training facility. After expiration of C-E's contract, the S1C contract was subsequently awarded to Knolls Atomic Power Laboratory (KAPL), who operated the unit until its decommissioning and dismantlement in the late 1990s and early 2000s.

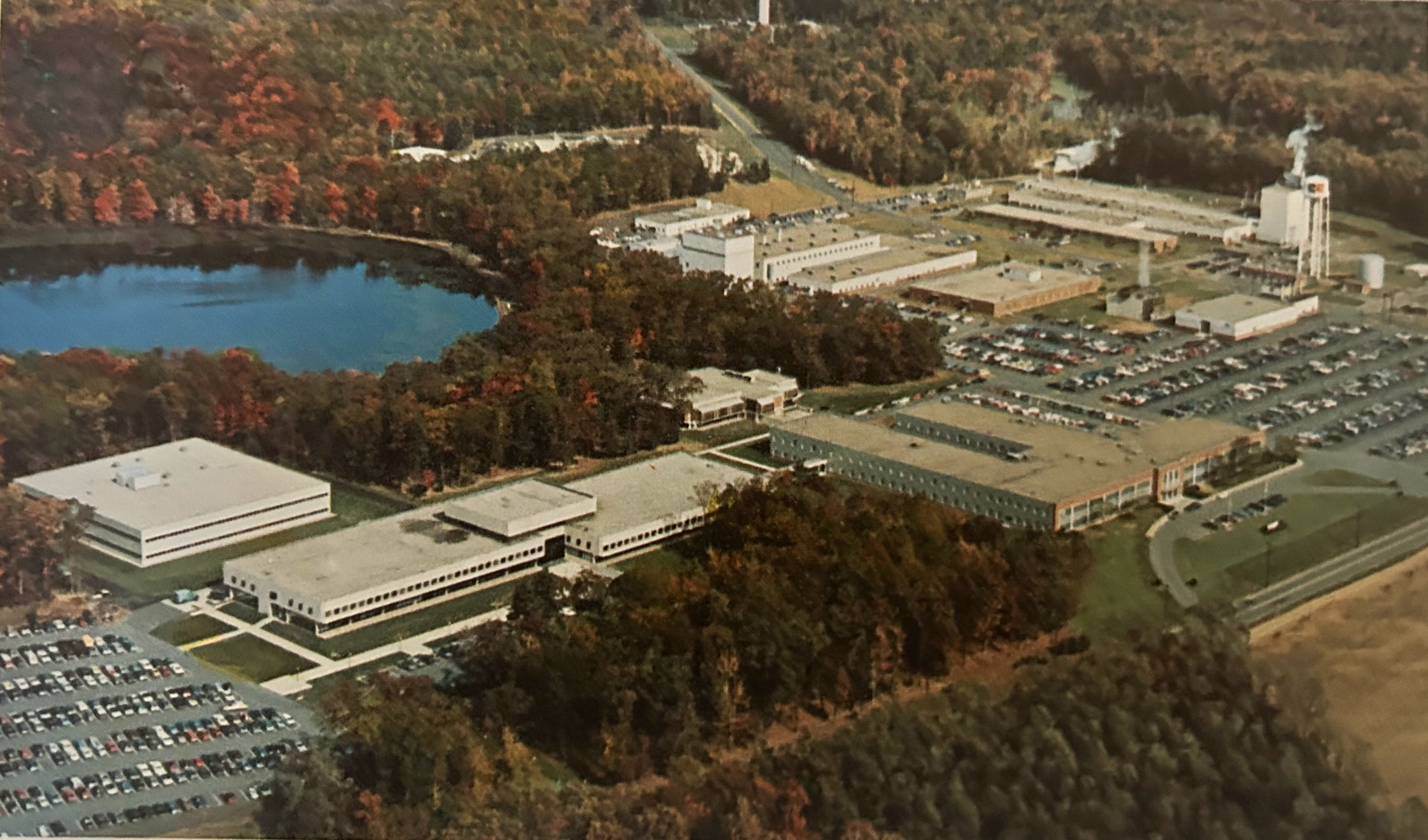

In the 1960s, C-E began selling nuclear power steam supply systems (NSSS). The first commercial NSSS was sold to Consumers Power Company of Michigan for the Palisades Nuclear Generating Station, which closed in 2022. C-E competed aggressively with General Electric, Babcock & Wilcox and Westinghouse. C-E supplied full NSSS packages for 15 United States nuclear power plant units in the Combustion Engineering Fleet, making it the second largest US NSSS supplier.

In the late 1960s the company supplied nuclear reactor systems and fabricated uranium fuel for electric utility companies. A joint venture was announced in April 1968, involving the Combustion Engineering Company, Houston Natural Gas, and Ranchers Exploration & Development Corporation. The three businesses combined to search for uranium on 250,000 acres (1,000 km^{2}) in New Mexico.

C-E was generally credited with a superior design, evidenced by the fact that the megawatt yield of its nuclear reactors was typically about 10% higher than that of comparable Westinghouse plants. The basis for this increase in efficiency was a computer-based system called the Core Operating Limit Supervisory System (COLSS) for design, and the Core Protection Calculator (CPC) for real-time control room operation, which leveraged almost 300 in-core neutron detectors and a patented algorithm to allow higher power densities. Combustion also fabricated a number of the Westinghouse reactor vessels and steam generators at its Chattanooga manufacturing facility under contracts with the Westinghouse company.

C-E maintained a sophisticated nuclear reactor operator training simulator at the Windsor facility for support for customers of its nuclear steam supply systems.

=== Structure and organization ===
In the 1960s, and continuing through 1988, C-E acquired a number of companies, many not directly related to the core utility steam supply business. As a result, the company structure evolved so that it had five and later six major business groups or divisions. C-E Power Systems comprised the original utility steam supply components, C-E Industrial Group, C-E Lummus & Engineering Services Group, C-E Refractories & Minerals Group, C-E Oil & Gas Group, and last C-E Instrumentation & Controls Group were formed to provide management focus as the company and its products base expanded. The Power Systems Division included the original major manufacturing facilities at Chattanooga, St. Louis, Monongahela, Birmingham; and in Canada, Brantford, Cornwall, and Upper Canada Manufacturing. A number of companies were acquired or developed and added to the division including, American Pole Structures, C-E Controls, the P.F. Avery Co., C-E Impel, C-E Maguire (Charles A. Maguire & Associates) and C-E Metals (primarily a specialty scrap metal operation in Chattanooga); and was basically divided into three major sub-groups: Fossil, Nuclear, and Services (which included field erection, aftermarket spare parts, and engineering services). The Industrial Group included C-E Industrial Boiler (part of the original base of CE in East Chicago, IN and Detroit & Saginaw, MI), C-E Bauer (Pulp & Paper Equipment), C-E Raymond (Crushing and Conveying Equipment), C-E Air Preheater (Ljungström® technology), C-E Tyler Screening (Industrial Wire Screens), C-E Ehrsham (Conveyors & Grain Elevators). C-E Enterprise Manufacturing, C-E Tyler Elevator, CERREY, and other industrial supply companies. The Oil & Gas Group included such companies as C-E Natco, C-E Grey Tool, Beaumont Well Works, C-E Vetco, OilField Engineering, C-E Houston Forging, etc. The Refractories & Minerals Group included C-E Minerals, C-E Refractories, C-E Cast Industrial Products, C-E Building Products (C-E Aluminum Building Products, C-E Morgan, C-E Stanley Artex), Georgia Kaolin, Pryor-Giggey, C-E Transport, C-E Glass, C-E Hordis Bros. Glass, etc. The Instrumentation & Controls group included C-E Taylor Instruments, C-E Resource Recovery Systems, C-E Process Analytics (acquired from Bendix), et al. Each group had a separate headquarters and support staff which coordinated each group's companies actions with the C-E Corporate support functions of Administration, Information Systems, Insurance, Treasury, Accounting, Audit, and Personnel.

C-E had a large presence in Canada, including fossil and nuclear steam supply manufacturing facilities. A number of the Industrial Group companies had manufacturing facilities there as well, primarily located in the province of Ontario. The Oil & Gas Group had operations in the provinces of Alberta and Saskatchewan. C-E maintained offices as well as a number of manufacturing sites on a worldwide basis, including the UK, Ireland, Austria, Germany, Italy, South Africa, Belgium, Mexico and France. C-E's technology on a wide range of products was licensed worldwide.

=== Leadership and management ===
For much of the existence of the company, the Santry family controlled the management of C-E. Joseph Santry was President of the company until 1963. Arthur Santry, Jr., Joseph's nephew, was named president in 1963 and Chairman of the C-E Board of Directors in 1982 and held both titles until he resigned his post as president in 1984. He remained as chairman until 1988. Charles Hugel was named President of C-E in 1984 and remained in that position until 1988 when he succeeded Mr. Santry as chairman of the board. George Kimmel was named president and Chief Operating Officer in 1988 and remained in that position until the sale of the company to ABB in 1990.

=== Ownership changes ===
In 1990 C-E became a wholly owned subsidiary of ABB (Asea Brown Boveri), a Swiss-Swedish multinational conglomerate based in Zürich and one of the largest electrical engineering companies in the world.

C-E's financial debt and lingering asbestos liability brought ABB to the brink of bankruptcy in the early 2000s. ABB was able to resolve asbestos claims filed against Combustion Engineering and Lummus Global in 2006 with a billion-plus dollar settlement agreement.

ABB and Alstom merged their power groups in 1999 creating a 50/50 joint venture, ABB-Alstom Power. In 2000, Alstom bought out ABB.

In 2001, the nuclear steam supply system vendor portion of the company, operating as Combustion Engineering, was bought by Westinghouse Electric Co., a then subsidiary of British Nuclear Fuels.

On November 2, 2015 GE Power announced it had completed the acquisition of Alstom's power and grid businesses.

== See also ==
- Babcock & Wilcox
- SL-1 (Idaho reactor operated by CE until 1961)
