= OPNAV Instruction =

An OPNAVINST or OPNAV Instruction is a formally documented lawful order that is issued by the United States Navy chief of naval operations. These instructions are typically used to establish US Navy policy, procedures, and requirements. The instructions are issued in the form of a memorandum on official Department of the Navy letterhead. Each instruction is referenced with an OPNAVINST directive number and a date. Typically, when a new instruction supersedes a previous instruction, a cancellation notice citing the prior OPNAVINST number is included.
