= Naval Vessel Register =

Official inventory of ships and service craft of the United States Navy

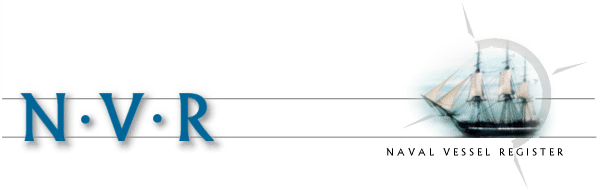

The Naval Vessel Register (NVR) is the official inventory of ships and service craft in custody of or titled by the United States Navy. It contains information on ships and service craft that make up the official inventory of the Navy from the time a vessel is authorized through its life cycle and disposal. It also includes ships that have been removed from the register (often termed stricken or struck), but not disposed of by sale, transfer to another government, or other means. Ships and service craft disposed of prior to 1987 are not included, but are gradually being added along with other updates.

== History ==
The NVR traces its origin back to the 1880s, having evolved from several previous publications. In 1911, the Bureau of Construction and Repair published Ships Data US Naval Vessels, which subsequently became the Ships Data Book in 1952 under the Bureau of Ships. The Bureau of Ordnance's Vessel Register, first published in 1942 and retitled Naval Vessel Register, was combined with the Ships Data Book under the Bureau of Ships in 1959.

Since 1962, the NVR has been maintained and published by the NAVSEA Shipbuilding Support Office (NAVSHIPSO) of the Naval Sea Systems Command. Referred to by Congress in the statutes of 10 U.S.C. §§ 8674–8678, the NVR is maintained as directed by U.S. Navy Regulations, Article 0406, of September 14, 1990.

The vessels are listed in the NVR when the classification and hull number(s) are assigned to ships and service craft authorized to be built by the president of the United States, or when the chief of naval operations requests instatement or reinstatement of vessels as approved by the secretary of the Navy. Once listed, the ship or service craft remains in the NVR throughout its life as a Navy asset. Afterwards, its final disposition is recorded. Many vessels struck from the NVR are transferred to the Navy Inactive Fleet or to the United States Maritime Administration (MARAD) to become part of the National Defense Reserve Fleet. Some continue limited operation in the Ready Reserve Fleet.

The NVR is updated weekly and as of the 2010s is only available in electronic form online. Over 6,500 separate record transactions are processed annually with each being supported by official documentation. The NVR includes a list of ships and service craft on hand, under construction, converted, loaned/leased, or to be loaned, and those assigned to the Military Sealift Command. Ship class, fleet assignment, name, age, home port, planning yard, custodian, hull and machinery characteristics, builder, key construction dates, battle forces, local defense and miscellaneous support forces, and status conditions are some of the data elements provided.

In March 2014, the Navy started counting self-deployable support ships for the fleet such as minesweepers, surveillance craft, and tugs as part of its "battle fleet" in order to reach a count of 272 as of October 2016.

== See also ==
- Dictionary of American Naval Fighting Ships
- Navy Directory
