= USS Greenling (SSN-614) =

Submarine of the United States

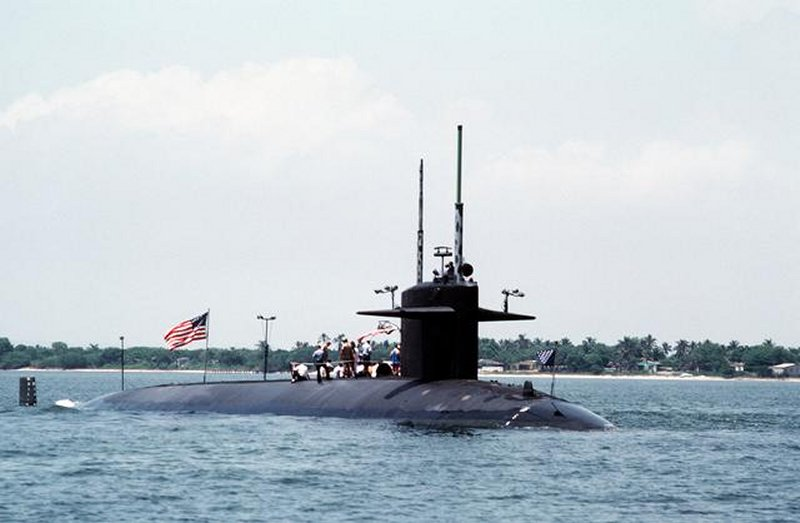
- USS Greenling (SSN-614)

History

United States
- Name: USS Greenling
- Awarded: 9 June 1960
- Builder: General Dynamics Electric Boat, Groton, Connecticut
- Laid down: 15 August 1961
- Launched: 4 April 1964
- Commissioned: 3 November 1967
- Decommissioned: 18 April 1994
- Stricken: 18 April 1994
- Motto: Steel true and blade straight
- Fate: Entered Ship-Submarine Recycling Program, 1994

General characteristics
- Class & type: Thresher/Permit-class submarine
- Displacement: 3,732 long tons (3,792 t)
- Length: 292 ft 3 in (89.08 m)
- Beam: 31 ft 8 in (9.65 m)
- Draft: 24 ft (7.3 m)
- Propulsion: S5W PWR
- Speed: more than 30 knots (56 km/h; 35 mph)
- Complement: 114 officers and men
- Armament: • 4 × 21 in (533 mm) torpedo tubes

USS Greenling (SSN-614) was a Permit-class submarine. She was the second ship of the United States Navy to be named for the greenling, an elongated, fine-scaled fish found from Kamchatka to California. Her keel was laid down on 15 August 1961 by General Dynamics Electric Boat of Groton, Connecticut.

On 10 April 1963, Thresher, the lead ship of Greenling's class, was lost due to severe design flaws in her non-nuclear piping systems. Because she was still early in the construction process, Greenling was one of three selected Thresher-class submarines selected for conversion to the "improved Thresher class." (The other two were SSN-613 Flasher and SSN-615 Gato.) She was launched on 4 April 1964 sponsored by Mrs. H.C. Bruton. On 29 April, she was towed to Quincy, Massachusetts, for lengthening and submarine safety program (SUBSAFE) modifications. Modifications included increased buoyancy and adding 13 feet 9 inches of length to the hull, providing improved living and working conditions for the crew and space for additional equipment. Before construction of Greenling was completed, she and her sister ships were redesignated the Permit class, after the eldest surviving member of the class. Greenling was commissioned on 3 November 1967.

== Service history ==
On 27 May 1968, Greenling's fleet training exercise was interrupted by the search and rescue operation for missing submarine USS Scorpion (SSN-589). Her commanding officer was designated the Commander of the SAR Task Element, which included of three nuclear and four diesel submarines. That assignment continued until 12 June 1968.

Greenling spent most of her career assigned to Submarine Squadron 10 (SUBRON 10) and was homeported in Groton, Connecticut.

On 27 March 1973, Greenling accidentally dived "well below its test depth" during a training dive off the coast of Bermuda due to a faulty depth gauge. A different gauge revealed the error and the submarine returned to the surface safely. Various reports placed Greenling between 150 and 200 feet from crush depth at her deepest point. After returning to port, she was sent to Portsmouth Naval Shipyard in Maine for examination, and was returned to service soon after.

In the spring of 1983, Greenling was participating in a Tactical Readiness Exam (TRE) in the Caribbean, when, during a drill to evade an enemy surface ship, a full down-angle with a flank bell was ordered. The flank bell necessitates the reactor's main coolant pumps switching from slow to fast speed. However, the slow-speed windings did not open before the fast-speed windings, resulting in a fireball that went through the entire vital switchgear in auxiliary machinery space upper level. All propulsion was lost, which is necessary to "drive" the boat back to the surface. A normal ballast tank blow had no effect, while a subsequent emergency blow of the ballast tanks slowly stopped the descent and ultimately brought the boat and crew to the surface. In rough seas, the crew back aft in engineering were unable to utilize the aft escape hatch to bring fresh air and cooling into the spaces. The engineering crew ultimately spent approximately 6 hours back aft with no AC, before finally making it forward, taking turns on the superstructure planes to cool off. The Greenling and crew spent approximately 2 weeks in Roosevelt Roads, Puerto Rico making repairs to allow the boat to make it back to New London on the surface. The event has been lovingly referred to as "The BBQ of 83".

Greenling was decommissioned on 18 April 1994 and was subsequently disposed through the Nuclear Powered Ship and Submarine Recycling Program at Puget Sound Naval Shipyard on 30 September 1994. Equipment from Greenling's control room was salvaged and used to construct a simulation of a submarine control room as an exhibit at the Naval Undersea Museum in Keyport, Washington.
