= USS Fulton (AS-11) =

Tender of the United States Navy

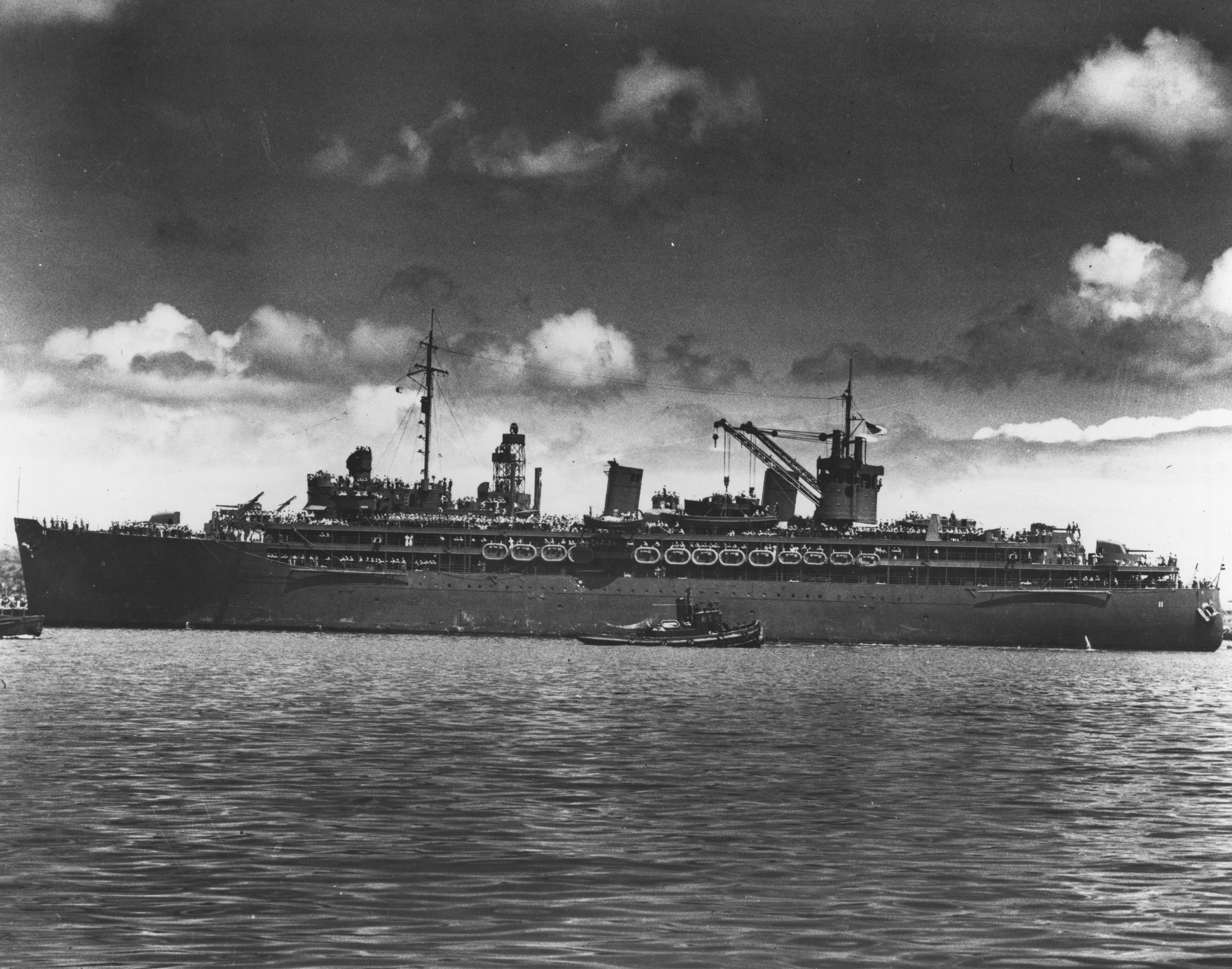
- USS Fulton in 1942

History

United States
- Name: USS Fulton
- Namesake: Robert Fulton
- Builder: Mare Island Navy Yard
- Launched: 27 December 1940
- Commissioned: 12 September 1941
- Decommissioned: 3 April 1947
- Recommissioned: 10 April 1951
- Decommissioned: 30 September 1991
- Stricken: 20 December 1991
- Honors and awards: 1 battle star for World War II service; 2 Navy Meritorious Unit Commendations; 2 awards of the Navy "E"
- Fate: Sold for scrap 17 November 1995

General characteristics
- Class & type: Fulton-class submarine tender
- Displacement: 9,250 long tons (9,400 t)
- Length: 529 ft 6 in (161.39 m)
- Beam: 73 ft 4 in (22.35 m)
- Draft: 23 ft 6 in (7.16 m)
- Installed power: 12,000 hp (8,900 kW)
- Propulsion: General Motors diesel engines; 2 × screws
- Speed: 20 kn (23 mph; 37 km/h)
- Range: 12,000 nmi (14,000 mi; 22,000 km) at 16 kn (18 mph; 30 km/h)
- Complement: 1,303
- Armament: 4 × 5 in (127 mm)/38 cal dual purpose guns

USS Fulton (AS-11) was the leader of her class of seven submarine tenders, launched on 27 December 1940 by Mare Island Navy Yard and sponsored by Mrs. A. T. Sutcliffe, great-granddaughter of Robert Fulton. Fulton was commissioned on 12 September 1941.

== Service history ==
=== World War II ===
Fulton was underway on her shakedown cruise out of San Diego when the Japanese attacked Pearl Harbor on 7 December 1941. She was ordered at once to Panama, arriving on 9 December. During the next month, she established advanced seaplane bases in the Gulf of Fonseca, Nicaragua, and in the Galapagos Islands, then returned to San Diego to prepare for Pacific duty. She tended Pacific Fleet submarines at Pearl Harbor from 15 March to 8 July 1942, putting to sea during the Battle of Midway. She transported many of the survivors of the sunken aircraft carrier Yorktown back to Pearl Harbor, arriving on 8 June. She was at Midway until 17 October, and at Brisbane from 9 November. There she established a submarine base and rest camp, refitted submarines between their war patrols, and acted as tender to other types of ships. Milne Bay, New Guinea was her station from 29 October 1943 to 17 March 1944, when she sailed for a west coast overhaul.

Fulton returned to Pearl Harbor on 13 June 1944 and gave her services to submarines there for a month, then at Midway from 18 July to 8 September, and then at Saipan until 25 April 1945. She returned to duty at Pearl Harbor from 7 May to 9 June, and then sailed for Guam, where she refitted submarines for the last patrols of the war.

=== Post-war service ===
==== 1946-1947 ====
Fulton served as tender at Pearl Harbor after a west-coast overhaul from February–May 1946, then sailed for Bikini Atoll to participate in Operation Crossroads that summer during the atomic weapons tests in the Marshall Islands. She cared for the six submarines assigned to the project and acted as repair ship for other vessels in the task force. On 18 September 1946, she arrived at Mare Island Navy Yard, where she was decommissioned and placed in reserve on 3 April 1947.

==== 1951-1960 ====
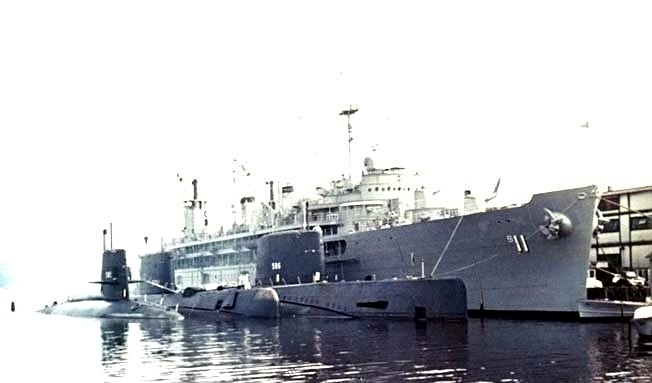
Skipjack, Nautilus, Triton, and Fulton at State Pier in New London, Connecticut (1962).

Fulton was recommissioned on 10 April 1951 and sailed three weeks later for New London, CT, her home port for the next 40 years until she was decommissioned in 1991. Her primary assignment was as tender for Submarine Squadron 10 (SubRon 10) at Submarine Base New London (situated across the Thames River in Groton), but she occasionally relieved fellow tender Orion at Norfolk, Virginia, and also left New London for exercises from Newfoundland and Iceland to the Caribbean. She first crossed the Atlantic in the fall of 1957 for Operation Natoflex, visiting Rothesay, Scotland and Portland, England before returning to New London. A heightening of her responsibility came on 1 April 1958, when three nuclear submarines were assigned to her squadron. In August, she sailed to New York City for the arrival of Nautilus from her historic submerged passage under the North Pole. From August 1959-January 1960, she underwent a modernization overhaul at the Philadelphia Naval Shipyard in order to be able to service both nuclear and conventional submarines, whether at home or overseas, making her the world's first nuclear support tender.

She continued to serve as flagship and tender to Submarine Squadron 10 when it became the first all nuclear submarine squadron. The Nautilus, Seawolf, Skate, Triton, and Skipjack were among the historic and innovative submarines assigned to Submarine Squadron 10 during Fulton's service.

==== 1972-1991 ====
Fulton made a five-month deployment to the Mediterranean from July to December 1972. Her mission was to prepare for full-time use as an advance refit site for nuclear-powered fast attack submarines. This was the first deployment of a World War II-vintage submarine tender to the Mediterranean since World War II.

Fulton returned to New London after a shipyard overhaul in 1976 to continue supporting Atlantic Fleet Submarines. She was modernized in 1983-1984 during an extensive overhaul conducted at Electric Boat in Groton, Connecticut and General Dynamics in Quincy, Massachusetts. In January 1985, she made a four-month deployment to the Mediterranean where she provided maintenance for the 6th Fleet submarines in La Maddalena, Italy.

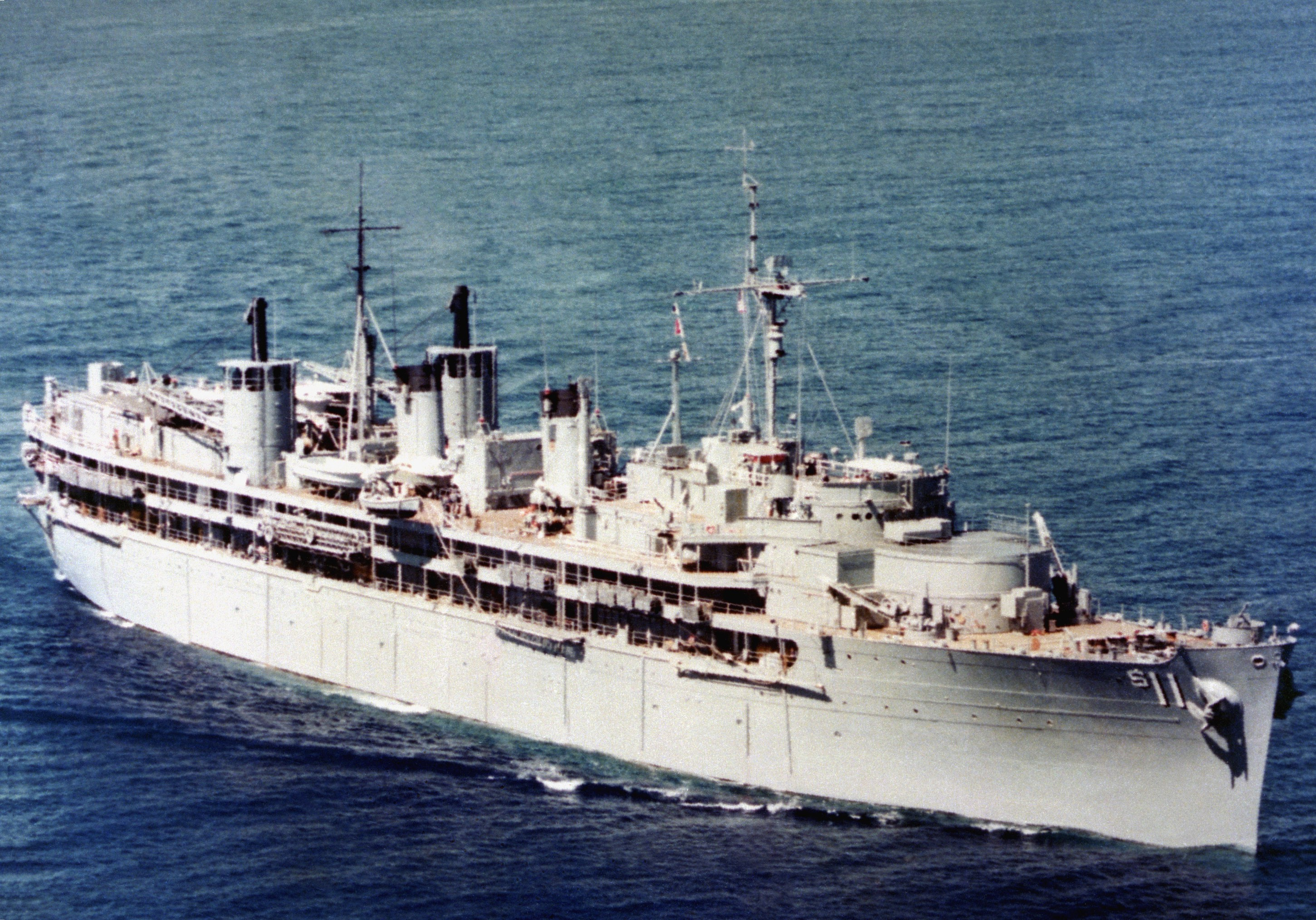
Fulton in 1984.

The tender made cruises to Puerto Rico in January 1986 and Bermuda in March 1987. From 13 January-12 March 1988, she completed a Drydocking Selected Restricted Availability at Norfolk Shipbuilding Company in Norfolk, Virginia. She returned to the State Pier in New London and continued to support Submarine Squadron 10 (SubRon 10) submarines until her decommissioning in 1991.

In 1988, Fulton was the flagship of SubRon 10, which included Jack, Tinosa, Dace, Whale, Greenling, Gato, Pargo, Trepang, Billfish, and the torpedo retriever Labrador (TWR-681).

On 30 September 1991, SubRon 10 was disbanded and Fulton was decommissioned at her berth in New London. She was the fourth oldest commissioned ship in the Navy at the time, exceeded only by the USS Vulcan (AR-5), USS Jason AR-8, and the USS Constitution.

== Awards ==
During her career the USS Fulton earned the following awards -

| Meritorious Unit Commendation (2 awards) | | Navy E Ribbon (2 awards) |
| American Defense Service Medal with "FLEET" clasp | Asiatic-Pacific Campaign Medal (1 battle star) | World War II Victory Medal |
| National Defense Service Medal (2 stars) | Armed Forces Expeditionary Medal | Sea Service Deployment Ribbon |
