= USS Flasher (SSN-613) =

Submarine of the United States

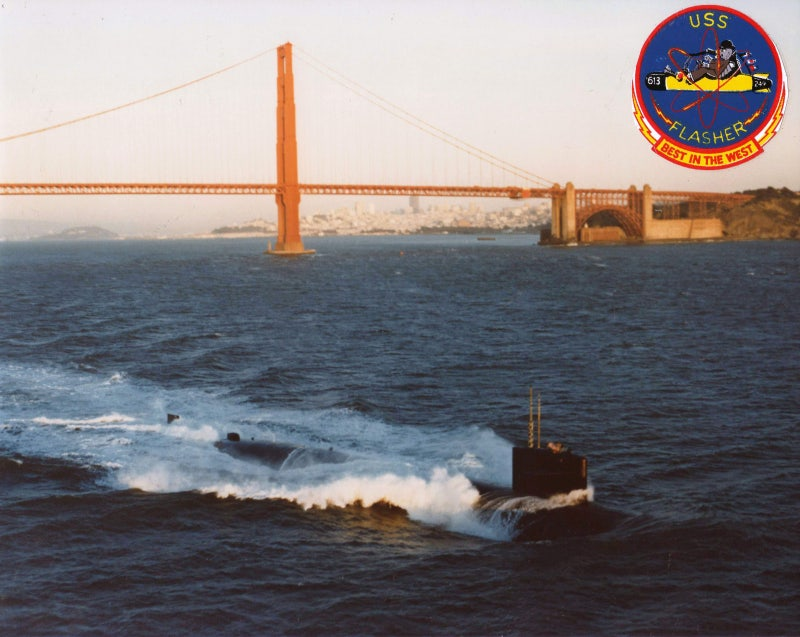
- Flasher underway outside San Francisco Bay

History

United States
- Name: USS Flasher
- Namesake: The flasher, a fish of the family Lobotidae
- Awarded: 9 June 1960
- Builder: General Dynamics Electric Boat, Groton, Connecticut
- Laid down: 14 April 1961
- Launched: 22 June 1963
- Sponsored by: Mrs. Paul F. Fay, Jr.
- Commissioned: 22 July 1966
- Decommissioned: 14 September 1992
- Stricken: 14 September 1992
- Motto: Best in the West
- Honors and awards: 5 × Battle Effectiveness Awards; 4 × Meritorious Unit Commendations; Navy Unit Commendation; Presidential Unit Citation
- Fate: Scrapped via Ship-Submarine Recycling Program
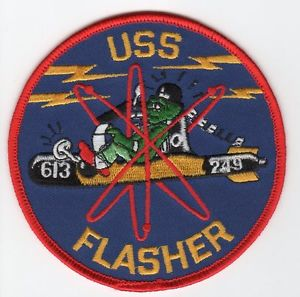
- Badge

General characteristics
- Class & type: Thresher/Permit-class submarine
- Displacement: 3,540 long tons (3,597 t) surfaced; 4,200 long tons (4,267 t) submerged
- Length: 292 ft (89 m)
- Beam: 31 ft 8 in (9.65 m)
- Propulsion: S5W PWR
- Speed: 15 knots (28 km/h; 17 mph) surfaced; 28 knots (52 km/h; 32 mph)+ submerged
- Complement: 12 officers and 76 men (Actual inservice crew; 13 Officers, 100 men)
- Armament: 4 × 21 in (533 mm) torpedo tubes

USS Flasher (SSN-613), a Permit-class submarine, was the second ship of the United States Navy to be named for the flasher, a member of the fish family Lobotidae, which have an unusual placement of the second dorsal and anal fins, posteriorly located on the body, close to the tail.

== Construction history ==
The contract to build her was awarded to the Electric Boat Division of General Dynamics Corporation in Groton, Connecticut on 9 June 1960 and her keel was laid down on 14 April 1961.

Originally laid down as the eleventh submarine in the Thresher-class building program, Flasher was extensively modified during the construction period. These modifications consisted of lengthening the hull, lengthening the sail, and upgrading the watertight integrity of the sea water systems. The SUBSAFE Program was developed as a result of the loss of USS Thresher, the first submarine of the class; Flasher became the first submarine certified as SUBSAFE. This contributed to the lengthy delay between being laid down and commissioning.

In the nation's only simultaneous twin launching of Nuclear submarines, Flasher and USS Tecumseh were launched on 22 June 1963. Flasher was sponsored and christened by Mrs. Paul F. Fay, Jr., wife of the Under Secretary of the Navy. Vice Admiral Elton W. Grenfell, then Commander Submarine Force, U.S. Atlantic Fleet (ComSubLant), delivered the principal address. She was commissioned on 22 July 1966, with Commander Kenneth M. Carr in command. The principal speaker at the commissioning was US Representative George W. Grider of Tennessee, who had commanded Flasher (SS-249) during World War II and presented Cdr Carr with the original WW II Flasher Battle Flag that was later mounted and hung in the crewsmess.

== Service history ==
=== 1966–1969 ===
After commissioning, Flasher arrived at new her home port of Pearl Harbor, Hawaii, on 23 September 1966, under command of CDR Kenneth M. Carr. On 7 October 1966 she received a visit from the Director General of the Japanese Defense Agency Mr. Elkichi Kambayashiyama, in company with COMSUBPAC Rear Admiral John H. Maurer.

In late January 1968 Flasher deployed with the fleet assembled after the USS Pueblo was captured by the North Koreans. Her station was in the Sea of Japan off the harbor of Wonsan, NK. While patrolling she encountered a small ice flow that snapped off the top of a periscope. Flasher proceeded to Guam for 9 days to have the periscope replaced and then proceeded back to her station off North Korea. After leaving station Flasher obtained permission to have a port call at Yokosuka, Japan before sailing for her home port of Pearl Harbor, Hawaii. For this deployment Flasher was awarded the Armed Forces Expeditionary Medal and the Korean Defense Service Medal.

Flasher sailed for her first Western Pacific (WESTPAC) deployment on 25 April 1969, and was awarded her first Battle Efficiency "E" for overall combat excellence on 4 July 1968. Flasher was awarded her second consecutive Battle Efficiency "E" on 1 July 1969. On 2 December 1969 Flasher was awarded her first Meritorious Unit Commendation for her service during the period March 1967 through August 1968.

=== 1970–1979 ===
On 15 June 1970 Flasher commenced her first major overhaul at Pearl Harbor Naval Shipyard, which was completed by 12 June 1971. In November 1971 Flasher commenced another WESTPAC deployment, visiting Guam, Mariana Islands; White Beach, Okinawa; Yokosuka, Japan; Subic Bay, Philippines, and Hong Kong, before returning to her home port in June 1972. On 1 July 1972 Flasher was awarded her third Battle Efficiency "E" for overall combat excellence, and on 13 July 1972 received a visit from Secretary of the Navy John Chafee. On 19 August 1972 Flasher was awarded a Presidential Unit Citation, at a ceremony, where CDR R.F. Bacon assumed command. Bacon would later go on to become Vice Admiral and Assistant Chief of Naval Operations for Undersea Warfare. Flasher then participated in the RIMPAC 72 exercise that September.

On 2 March 1973 Flasher was awarded a Navy Unit Commendation for her operations in 1970–1971. She commenced another WESTPAC deployment in early 1973, visiting Yokosuka, Japan, Guam, and Hong Kong before returning to Pearl Harbor on 24 December 1973. During this tour, on 1 July 1973, she was awarded her fourth Battle Efficiency "E" for overall combat excellence. In June 1974 Flasher completed a two-month special operation.

Flasher commenced her second overhaul (Refueling and Overhaul) at Mare Island Naval Shipyard on 11 January 1975, changed homeport to Mare Island, and shifted administrative command to Submarine Squadron 3. The overhaul completed on 16 December 1976, she changed homeport to San Diego, California, on 22 December 1976.

In August 1977 she attended the Seattle Seafarer Festival.

"Flasher" completed a 3-month Mid-Pac / special operation April to June 1978.

In January 1979 Flasher commenced a Selected Restricted Availability (SRA) at Mare Island Naval Shipyard, which was completed on 29 March 1979. In June 1979 she attended the Portland Rose Festival. On 1 July 1979 she was awarded her fifth Battle Efficiency "E".

=== 1980–1992 ===
On 12 November 1980 she was awarded her second Meritorious Unit Commendation for the period November 1979 through May 1980, and on 5 November 1982 was awarded a third Meritorious Unit Commendation for the period July 1981 through January 1982. The crew earned the Navy Expeditionary Medal for actions taken during this period.

"Flasher" completed a 3-month Mid-Pac / special operation August to November 1982. The crew earned the Navy Expeditionary Medal for actions taken during this period.

Flasher commenced her third overhaul at Mare Island Naval Shipyard on 9 May 1983, which was completed on 26 March 1985, and she shifted homeport back to San Diego, California.

In March 1986 Flasher began another WESTPAC deployment, and visited Yokosuka, Japan; Guam; and Subic Bay, completing the voyage in August 1986. The crew earned the Navy Expeditionary Medal for actions taken during this period.

Flasher completed her last WESTPAC deployment, with visits to Guam; Yokosuka, Japan; Korea; and Hong Kong, in April 1990.

Flasher completed a two-month special operation in August–October 1990, and another in March–May 1991.

Flasher was awarded her Fourth Meritorious Unit Commendation in 1991 for the ship's last two-month special operation, and on 18 June 1991 an Inactivation Ceremony was held at the Naval Base Point Loma, San Diego, California. She shifted home port to Pearl Harbor for defueling and inactivation.

== Fate ==
Flasher was decommissioned on 26 May 1992 and stricken from the Naval Vessel Register on 14 September 1992. Ex-Flasher entered the Nuclear Powered Ship and Submarine Recycling Program in Bremerton, Washington. Recycling was completed on 11 May 1994.

== Awards ==
Flasher was highly decorated, receiving five Battle "E"s, four Meritorious Unit Commendations, a Navy Unit Commendation, and a Presidential Unit Citation during her 25-year career. She is one of only eight submarines to receive the Presidential Unit Citation since World War II.

Presidential Unit Citation – 1970

For extraordinary heroism and outstanding performance of duty as a member of the Submarine Force, United States Pacific Fleet, during the spring of 1970. USS FLASHER successfully accomplished an extremely difficult, demanding, and most sensitive operation of exceptional value and lasting significance to the readiness posture of the United States. The outstanding courage, resourcefulness, professional competence and inspiring devotion to duty displayed by the officers and men of USS FLASHER reflected great credit upon themselves and were in keeping with the highest traditions of the United States Naval Service.

== Ship insignia ==
The insignia of the Flasher was adapted from the insignia of the original Flasher (SS-249), commissioned on 25 September 1943. Popular lore was that this insignia was designed by Walt Disney. However, other sources indicate that the logo was designed by a graphic artist who also worked for Disney, and that at best Walt Disney merely looked over his shoulder and provided some suggestions. During the final days of construction on the SSN-613, the crew developed several designs based on the original. The two ships' numbers were added and the electron orbits added to symbolize nuclear power. The insignia became official in 1965.
