= Submarine Squadron 10 =

Submarine Squadron 10 (SUBRON 10) was a unit of the United States Navy during World War II in the Pacific and in the Atlantic Fleet after the war from 1951–1991. The number and type of submarines assigned to SUBRON 10 varied throughout its history.

== World War II ==
On 7 December 1941 the ships of the squadron were in Pearl Harbor or the surrounding area. Immediately after the attack, plans were made to begin the first patrols of the War. In March 1943, USS Tautog and COMSUBRON10 were sent to Brisbane, Australia to meet up with six S-boats from the Canal Zone along with the tender USS Griffin to form Task Force 42. For the next fourteen months, through May 1943, this group participated in the action around the Solomon Islands.

USS Wahoo's Fifth War Patrol Report was forwarded by Commander, Submarine Squadron Ten to ComSubPac at San Francisco, California, on May 22, 1943.

== Post World War II ==
SUBRON 10 was located at State Pier in New London, Connecticut from 1951 to 1991 and was typically assigned eight to ten attack submarines. SUBRON 10 was a subordinate command of Submarine Group 2 (which was designated as Submarine Flotilla 2 prior to the early 1970s). SUBRON 10 had two submarine divisions (SUBDIV 101 and SUBDIV 102) each with four or five submarines.

Throughout its time at New London, SUBRON 10 had the submarine tender USS Fulton as its tender and flagship. The submarine rescue ship USS Skylark was also assigned to SUBRON 10 throughout her career in the US Navy (1951–1973). In addition to its assigned submarines, Fulton and Skylark, SUBRON 10 also had the torpedo retriever Labrador (TWR-681) and a floating crane (nicknamed "Mary Ann") assigned to it.

On April 1, 1958, SUBRON 10 had the U.S. Navy's first three nuclear powered submarines (USS Nautilus, USS Seawolf and USS Skate) assigned to it. Among the historic submarines assigned to the squadron were Nautilus (SSN-571) (1958–c. 1975), Seawolf (SSN-575) (1958–1970), Skate (SSN-578) (1958–c. 1969), USS Skipjack (1959–1969) and USS Triton (1959–1969).

As of 1965, SUBRON 10 had the following submarines assigned: USS Entemedor (SS-340), USS Bang (SS-385), USS Tusk (SS-426), USS Sailfish (SS-572), USS Nautilus (SSN-571), USS Seawolf (SSN-575), USS Skate (SSN-578) and USS Skipjack (SSN-585).

In the late 1960s SUBRON 10 became the first submarine squadron to be composed entirely of nuclear powered submarines. From the late-1960s onward, most of the submarines assigned to SUBRON 10 were of the Permit class although some submarines of the Sturgeon class were assigned as of the early 1980s.

As of the early 1970s, SUBRON 10 consisted of USS Fulton (AS-11), USS Skylark (ASR-20), USS Nautilus (SSN-571), USS Seawolf (SSN-575), USS Haddo (SSN-604), USS Jack (SSN-605), USS Tinosa (SSN-606), USS Dace (SSN-607), USS Greenling (SSN-614) and USS Gato (SSN-615).

Submarine Squadron 10 was deactivated concomitant with the decommissioning of USS Fulton on September 30, 1991. The last submarine assigned to SUBRON 10 was the USS Tinosa (SSN-606) which was decommissioned in January 1992.

== Motto ==
Submarine Squadron 10's motto is "Find 'em, Chase 'em, Sink 'em'".
