= USS Haddock (SSN-621) =

Submarine of the United States

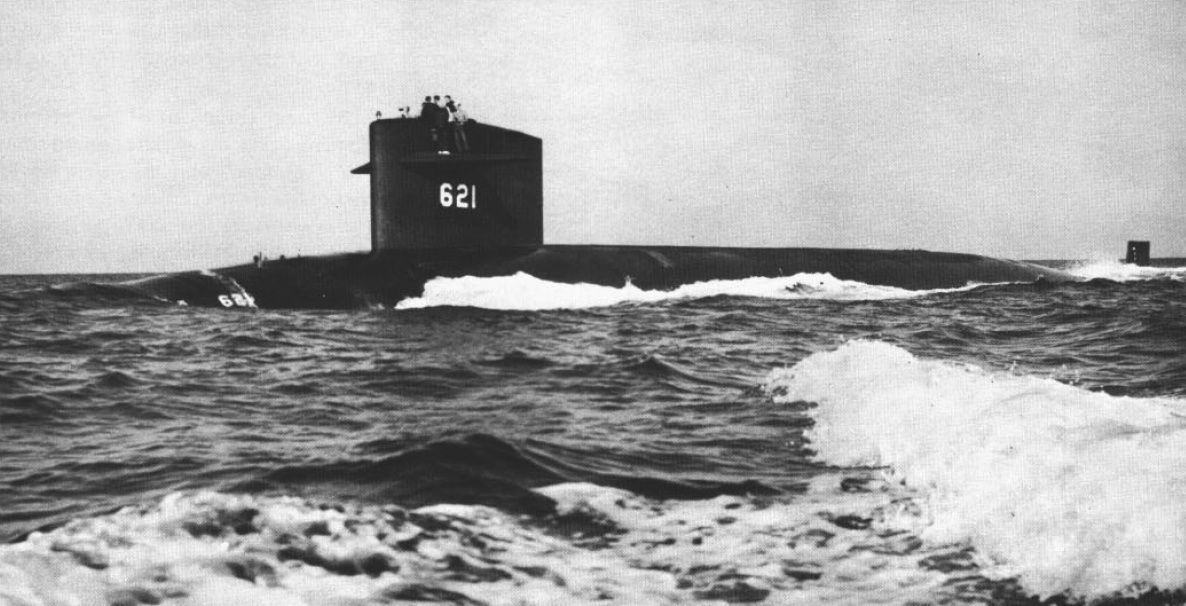
- USS Haddock (SSN-621)

History

United States
- Name: USS Haddock
- Namesake: The haddock, a large fish
- Awarded: 24 August 1960
- Builder: Ingalls Shipbuilding, Pascagoula, Mississippi
- Laid down: 24 April 1961
- Launched: 21 May 1966
- Sponsored by: Mrs. Thomas G. Morris
- Commissioned: 22 December 1967
- Decommissioned: 7 April 1993
- Stricken: 7 April 1993
- Home port: San Diego, later Pearl Harbor, Hawaii
- Honors and awards: 2 Vietnam Service Medals, Armed Forces Expeditionary Medal, Battle "E" Award.
- Fate: Entered Ship-Submarine Recycling Program, 1 October 2000; recycling completed 1 October 2001

General characteristics
- Class & type: Thresher/Permit-class submarine
- Displacement: 3,770 LT (3,830 tonnes) surfaced; 4,300 long tons (4,369 t) submerged
- Length: 279 ft (85 m)
- Beam: 31 ft 8 in (9.65 m)
- Propulsion: S5W PWR
- Complement: 100 officers and men
- Armament: 4 × 21 in (533 mm) torpedo tubes

USS Haddock (SSN-621), was the last Thresher/Permit-class submarine to be built. She was also the third ship of the United States Navy to be named after the haddock, a large species of fish.

The contract to build her was awarded to Ingalls Shipbuilding in Pascagoula, Mississippi on 24 August 1960 and her keel was laid down on 24 April 1961. She was launched on 21 May 1966, sponsored by Mrs. Corinne (Steven) Morris, wife of Representative Thomas G. Morris of New Mexico who had served on USS Sealion (SS-195) before WWII, and commissioned on 22 December 1967 with Commander Stanley J. Anderson in command.

== Service history ==
Commissioned in December 1967, Haddock underwent sea trials in the Gulf of Mexico. She transited the Panama Canal between January and February of 1968, arriving and being drydocked at Puget Sound Naval Yard in the spring of 1968. She was assigned to Submarine Squadron 3 in late 1968 and arrived at her first homeport, San Diego, in 1969. Following a deployment to the Western Pacific, her home port was transferred to Pearl Harbor in time for her first overhaul, which was completed in 1972. Haddock was awarded the Meritorious Unit Commendation for significant achievements during her next deployment.

Haddock underwent a resupply and refit in 1973 in her new homeport in Hawaii.

In 1977, Haddock had a 19-month overhaul in Mare Island, following which she was restationed in San Diego, and reassigned to Submarine Squadron Three.

In early 1981, Haddock participated in Ready Ex-81. Haddock completed her seventh deployment to the Western Pacific on 23 December 1983. She then went to Mare Island in October 1984 for her third overhaul and returned to San Diego and Submarine Squadron Three in February 1987. Haddock earned the Battle Efficiency "E" Award for fiscal year 1988.

Haddock deployed to the Western Pacific for the eleventh time from July to October 1991.

History needed for 1991–1993.

== Fate ==
Haddock was decommissioned and struck from the Naval Vessel Register on 7 April 1993. Ex-Haddock entered the Nuclear Powered Ship and Submarine Recycling Program on 1 October 2000. Recycling was completed on 1 October 2001.
