= USS Tinosa (SSN-606) =

Permit-class submarine operated by the United States Navy

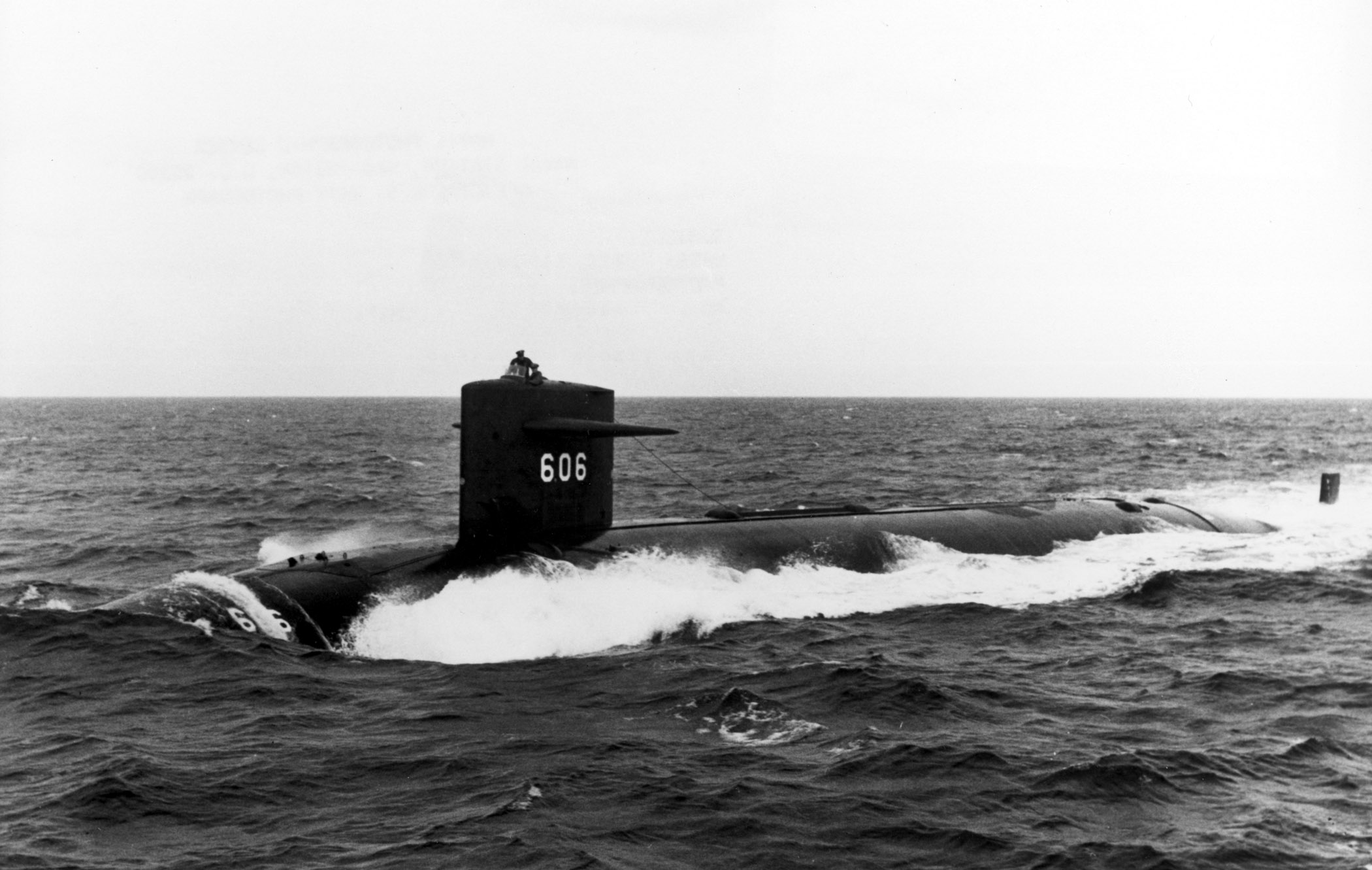
- USS Tinosa (SSN-606)

History

United States
- Name: USS Tinosa
- Namesake: The tinosa
- Awarded: 17 December 1958
- Builder: Portsmouth Naval Shipyard, Kittery, Maine
- Laid down: 24 November 1959
- Launched: 9 December 1961
- Commissioned: 17 October 1964
- Decommissioned: 15 January 1992
- Stricken: 15 January 1992
- Fate: Entered Ship-Submarine Recycling Program, 15 July 1991; recycling completed 26 June 1992

General characteristics
- Class & type: Thresher/Permit-class submarine
- Displacement: 3,700 long tons (3,759 t) surfaced; 4,300 long tons (4,369 t) submerged
- Length: 278 ft (85 m)
- Beam: 31 ft 7 in (9.63 m)
- Draft: 28 ft 5 in (8.66 m)
- Propulsion: S5W PWR
- Speed: 15 knots (28 km/h; 17 mph)+ surfaced; 28 knots (52 km/h; 32 mph)+ submerged
- Test depth: 1,300 feet (400 m)
- Complement: 96 officers and men
- Armament: 4 × 21 in (533 mm) torpedo tubes; SUBROC

USS Tinosa (SSN-606), a Permit-class submarine, was the second ship of the United States Navy to be named for the tinosa, a poisonous, black, tropical fish.

The contract to build her was awarded to Portsmouth Naval Shipyard in Kittery, Maine on 17 December 1958 and her keel was laid down on 24 November 1959. She was launched on 9 December 1961 sponsored by Mrs. Samuel S. Stratton, the wife of Congressman Samuel S. Stratton of New York, and commissioned on 17 October 1964.

== Service history ==
Following shakedown out of New London, Connecticut, the submarine underwent availability at her builder's yard from April to June 1966 before making a cruise to Faslane, Scotland, and the Caribbean Sea. After an overhaul which lasted from March through June 1967, the ship provided services for the Naval Underwater Sound Laboratory at New London through the first three months of 1968. During this tour, Tinosa was based briefly at Port Everglades, Florida, as well as at New London and visited Bermuda in the course of her operations. At the end of this experimental and test duty, Tinosa began local operations out of New London.

Tinosa continued to work off the eastern seaboard and in the Caribbean into 1969. During her major overhaul in the spring of that year, she received the SUBSAFE submarine safety improvements designed in the wake of the tragic loss of submarine Thresher (SSN-593) in April 1963.

Following the completion of this yard period in December 1971, Tinosa resumed active operations off the eastern seaboard and into the familiar waters of the Caribbean Sea and continued the routine into the middle of 1972. In July, she crossed the Atlantic for visits to ports in northern Europe and for deployment in the Mediterranean Sea with the 6th Fleet. After operating out of Sardinia and Holy Loch during this period, she returned home in December to conduct tests in conjunction with a project sponsored by the Massachusetts Institute of Technology.

Tinosa worked out of New London from 1 February 1973 until the end of March, operating with submarines and surface craft on exercises and maneuvers. After a three-day visit to the United States Naval Academy in late April, where she served in a familiarization program for midshipmen, Tinosa underwent a tender availability alongside Fulton (AS-11) at New London. In ensuing months, the submarine was twice deployed to Bermuda and operated off Andros Island before participating in joint United States-Canadian antisubmarine warfare exercises in December off the Florida coast.

After being dry-docked in auxiliary repair drydock USS Waterford (ARD-5) at New London from January to March 1974, Tinosa departed her home port on 19 May, bound for the Mediterranean, and conducted her second deployment with the Sixth Fleet through the summer months. She visited Bizerte from 24 June to 1 July and was the first nuclear-powered submarine to visit Tunisia.

Returning to New London on 16 November, the ship operated locally out of her homeport into late February 1975. Subsequently, operating in the Narragansett Bay area into the spring of that year, Tinosa departed New London on 23 July, bound for Charleston, South Carolina. She later shifted south to operate off the Florida coast. The ship underwent a major overhaul at the Ingalls Shipbuilding yard at Pascagoula, Mississippi, from late 1975 to 12 December 1977. She then resumed operations with the Atlantic Fleet commencing with two months of weapons system testing in the Caribbean from 13 February to 20 May 1978. This was followed by a combined exercise with units of the Royal Canadian Navy off Florida in mid-April. Most of the summer was spent in preparing for Tinosa's forthcoming deployment to the Mediterranean Sea. On 13 September, she departed New London for five months of operations with the Sixth Fleet. At the end of 1978, the nuclear attack submarine was in upkeep in La Maddalena, Sardinia, following operations with a NATO task force composed of United States, British, Italian, and Turkish naval units.

In 1981 Tinosa visited Frederiksted, St. Croix, as a port visit in October that year.

History from 1981 to 1988 needed.

On 4 January 1988, she departed New London for six months of operations with the Sixth Fleet in the Mediterranean. In October 1988 she departed New London for 60 days of North Atlantic Operations and crossed the Arctic Circle.

Tinosa was deactivated while still in commission on 15 July 1991, then decommissioned and stricken from the Naval Vessel Register on 15 January 1992. ex-Tinosa entered the Nuclear Powered Ship and Submarine Recycling Program in Bremerton, Washington, on 15 July 1991 and on 26 June 1992 ceased to exist.
