= USS Narwhal (SSN-671) =

Submarine of the United States

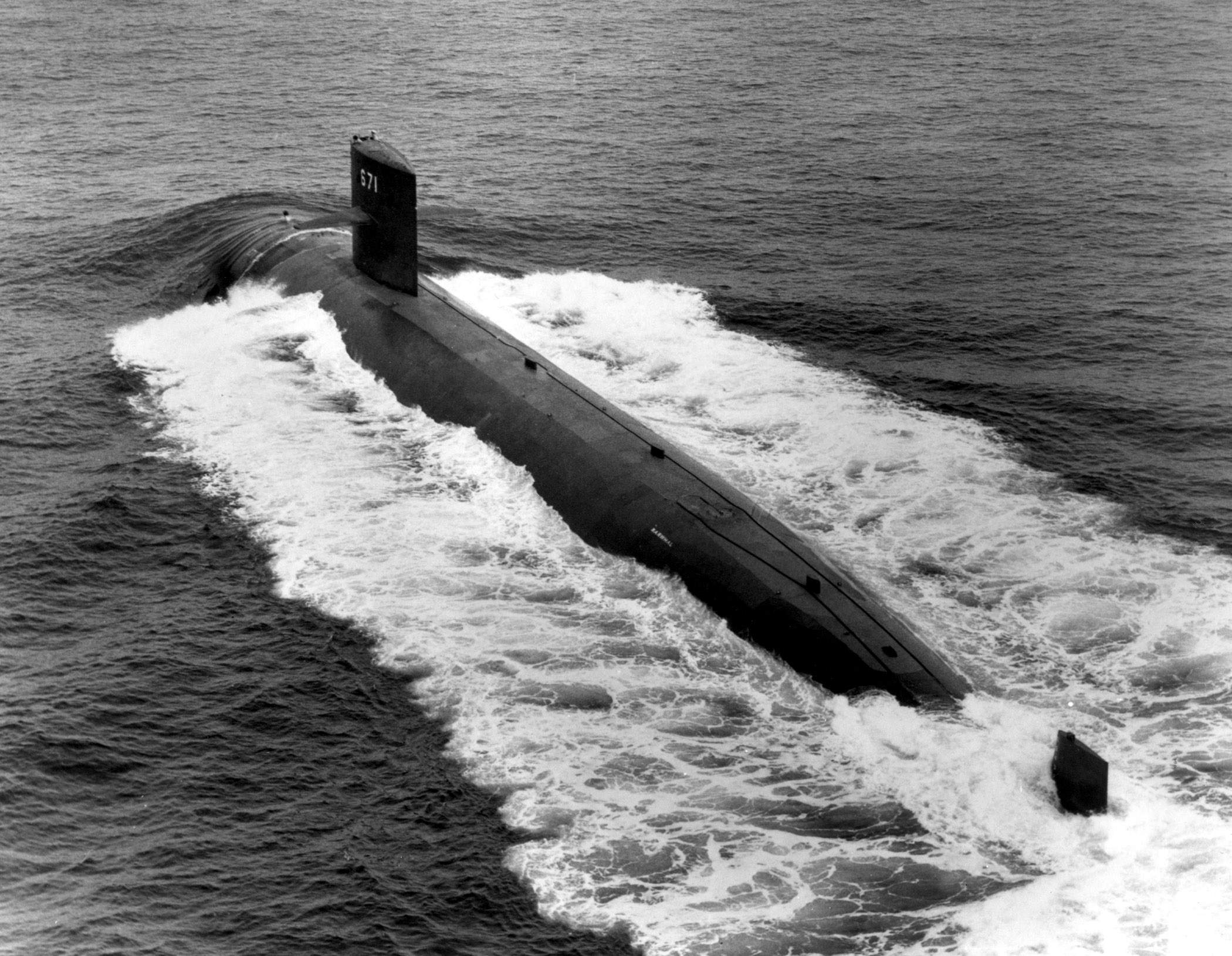
- USS Narwhal

History

United States
- Namesake: Narwhal
- Ordered: 28 July 1964
- Builder: General Dynamics Electric Boat, Groton, Connecticut
- Laid down: 17 January 1966
- Launched: 9 September 1967
- Sponsored by: Vice Admiral Glynn R. Donaho (ret.)
- Commissioned: 12 July 1969
- Decommissioned: 1 July 1999
- Stricken: 1 July 1999
- Fate: Scrapped

General characteristics
- Class & type: Nuclear submarine
- Displacement: 4,948 long tons (5,027 t) light; 5,293 long tons (5,378 t) full
- Length: 314 ft 8 in (95.91 m)
- Beam: 33 ft (10 m)
- Draft: 29 ft (8.8 m)
- Propulsion: 1 × S5G pressurized water reactor; 1 × steam turbine, 17,000 shp (13,000 kW); 1 shaft
- Speed: 20 knots (37 km/h) surfaced, 25 knots (46 km/h) submerged
- Complement: 12 officers, 95 enlisted
- Armament: 4 × 21 in (533 mm) torpedo tubes capable of launching: SUBROC; Mark 37 torpedoes; Mark 45 torpedoes; Mark 48 ADCAP torpedoes; Mines; Tomahawk missiles; Harpoon missiles

USS Narwhal (SSN-671), a unique submarine, was the third vessel of the United States Navy to be named for the narwhal, a gray and white arctic whale with a unicorn-like, ivory tusk.

Her keel was laid down on 17 January 1966 by the Electric Boat Division of General Dynamics Corporation, in Groton, Connecticut. She was launched on 9 September 1967 sponsored by Vice Admiral Glynn R. Donaho (ret.), and commissioned on 12 July 1969.

== Design ==
A unique design under project SCB 245, Narwhal was her own class. Forward of the reactor compartment she was broadly similar to the contemporary Sturgeon-class submarines, but with a slightly larger diameter and the relocation of the auxiliary diesel generator from the bow compartment to the auxiliary machine room in the operations compartment. Her reactor compartment and engine room were unlike those of previous classes due to her unique natural circulation S5G reactor and direct-drive turbine propulsion plant. Access to the engine room was provided by two separate reactor tunnels, each with their own watertight doors.

Narwhal's design featured several innovative quieting features, including:

- a natural circulation S5G reactor plant;
- less powerful main coolant pumps which had two speeds: On and Off;
- scoop seawater injection for the main condensers, allowing the main seawater pumps to be shut off at speed
- the ability to cross-connect main and auxiliary seawater systems;
- a large, direct-drive propulsion turbine which operated at a low shaft speed (300 RPM) and did not require reduction gears;
- ship service turbine generators which operated at a lower RPM (1,200 RPM vs. 3,600 RPM of previous classes);
- elimination of the waist ballast tanks which eliminated vibration noise caused by the thin outer hull.

The result was one of the quietest submarines of her era. Although successful, her propulsion plant had several issues. The propulsion turbine had to be very large to operate at such a low shaft speed, and required a complex warm-up and cooldown procedure. Her turbine generators experienced blade failures in tests due to their low rotational speed, and improvements in noise reduction techniques allowed the turbine generators of subsequent classes to operate at high speed (3,600 RPM) while remaining as quiet as those on Narwhal. Her seawater injection piping required large hull penetrations and long piping runs under full submergence pressure. Because this system was not compatible with SUBSAFE regulations, it was not repeated on subsequent classes. Other quieting features would be incorporated on subsequent submarine designs, and Narwhal's S5G reactor would be scaled up and doubled in power to become the S8G reactor that propels the Ohio-class submarines.

Narwhal was fitted with a "turtleback" structure just forward of her rudder that may have been used for remote-controlled underwater vehicles, or for housing an experimental towed sonar array.

== Career ==
Little information about Narwhal's career is available, but it was eventful and included a very heavy deployment rate interrupted only by three overhauls (two involving reactor refueling). Narwhal had few difficulties in Arctic waters, easily shadowing Soviet vessels. Those deployments earned Narwhal a Navy Unit Commendation for a 1972 deployment, and Meritorious Unit Commendations for operations in 1971, 1977, 1979, 1994, and 1998. She also earned the Battle Efficiency E (five awards), the Engineering E (four awards), and the Anti-Submarine Warfare A, the Communications C, and the Supply E. She may have also been used for special operations duty.

Narwhal sustained minor damage on 22 September 1989 when Hurricane Hugo hit Charleston, South Carolina. She was moored with nine double wires and two three-inch ship's lines in preparation for the storm. All but one of the lines parted during the first half of the storm, and she drifted into the Cooper River. Tugboats and Narwhal's crew tried unsuccessfully to move the submarine back to the pier before the second half of the storm. As the storm resumed, Narwhal submerged in the river and rode out the remainder of the hurricane with only part of her sail exposed.

In 1993, Navigator Harley O'Neill organized a reunion with the original 167 Narwhal crew from WWII. While there were three generations of Narwhal Submarines, (67, 167 and 671), over a single weekend, O'Neill managed to host and entertain both the 2nd generation as well as the third generation Narwhal crew on board as the special guests to his Capt. Lincoln and his command.

Narwhal was deactivated, while still in commission, on 16 January 1999 in Norfolk, Virginia. She was decommissioned and stricken from the Naval Vessel Register on 1 July 1999, and entered the Navy's Nuclear Powered Ship and Submarine Recycling Program (NPSSRP) in Bremerton, Washington on 1 October 2001. Over the next five years, efforts were made to make Narwhal the centerpiece of a planned National Submarine Science Discovery Center (NSSDC) in Newport, Kentucky. Legislation signed on 30 September 2003 authorized the Secretary of the Navy to transfer Narwhal to the NSSDC. The nuclear reactor and propulsion equipment would be removed and replaced with a plug of the proper dimensions and shape, containing a theater and classroom. However, on 26 April 2006, Peter Kay, board chair of the NSSDC, announced the cancellation of the exhibit, as fundraising had only raised $0.5 million of the $2 million needed. The boat was subsequently dismantled by October 2020 per the Navy's Ship-Submarine Recycling Program.

== See also ==
Other submarines with unique silencing features

- USS Tullibee (SSN-597)
- USS Jack (SSN-605)
- USS Glenard P. Lipscomb (SSN-685)
