= Kenneth Monroe Carr =

American admiral

- Born: March 17, 1925; Mayfield, Kentucky, U.S.
- Died: November 15, 2015 (aged 90); Cleveland, Ohio, U.S.
- Military career
- Allegiance: United States
- Branch: United States Navy
- Service years: 1943–1985
- Rank: Vice admiral
- Commands: Commander in Chief of the U.S. Atlantic Fleet

Kenneth Monroe Carr (March 17, 1925 – November 15, 2015) was a U.S. Navy vice admiral who was Deputy and Chief of Staff to the Commander in Chief Atlantic Command and the Commander in Chief of the U.S. Atlantic Fleet. He retired from the navy on May 1, 1985. He became Chairman of the U.S. Nuclear Regulatory Commission on July 1, 1989 having been a member of the Commission since August 14, 1986.

== Biography ==
Carr was born in Mayfield, Kentucky. He enlisted in the Navy in 1943 and served as a crewman on an Assault Landing Craft in the Pacific theater before being selected for an officer candidate program at the University of Louisville in 1944, and being appointed to the U.S. Naval Academy as a member of the class of 1949.

In 1950, he entered submarine school at the Naval Submarine Base New London in New London, Connecticut, and in 1953 was assigned to the precommissioning detail of the nuclear submarine USS Nautilus (SSN-571). With the exception of a one-year period for nuclear power training, he served as a member of the Nautilus crew until 1960. He later served as Commanding Officer of the nuclear submarine USS Flasher (SSN-613) and the fleet ballistic missile submarine USS John Adams (SSBN-620).

He was assigned to the Office of the Chief of Naval Operations (Research and Development) in 1968, and to the staff of the Commander in Chief of the U.S. Atlantic Fleet in 1970, as a senior member of the Naval Nuclear Propulsion Examining Board. In 1972, Chairman Carr was assigned as Chief of Staff to the Commander, Submarine Force of the U.S. Atlantic Fleet and in 1973, assumed duties of Military Assistant to the Deputy Secretary of Defense.

From June 1977 to May 1980, he commanded the Submarine Force, U.S. Atlantic Fleet. He served as Vice Director of Strategic Target Planning at Offutt Air Force Base, Nebraska, before assuming duties as Deputy and Chief of Staff to the Commander in Chief, U.S. Atlantic Command on April 1, 1983.

Among his honors are the Defense and Navy Distinguished Service Medals, the Legion of Merit, Presidential Unit Citation and the Defense Superior Service Medals.

== Personal life ==
Carr was married to the late Molly Pace of Burkesville, Kentucky.
