= Permit-class submarine =

US Navy fast attack submarines

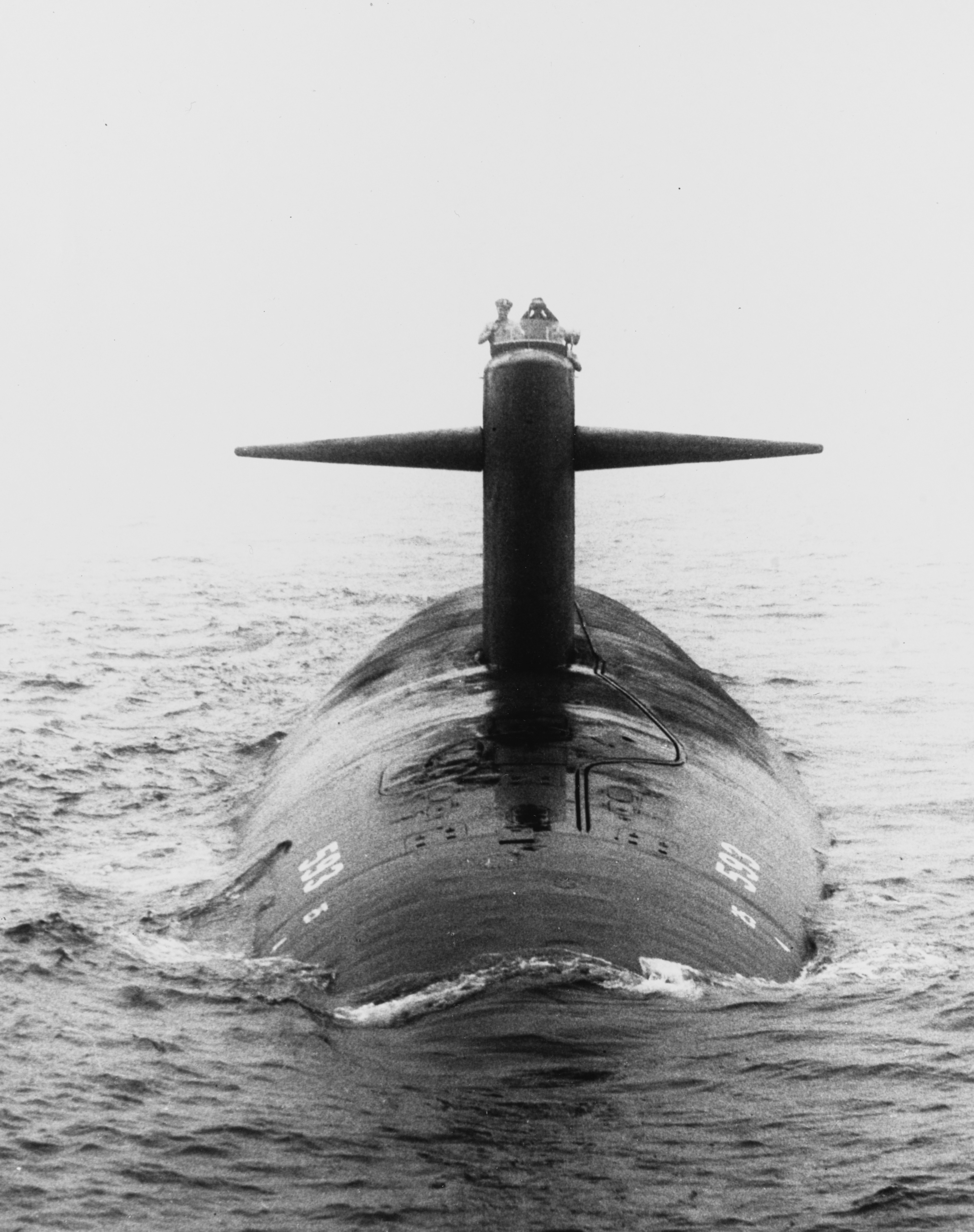
- USS Thresher (SSN-593)

Class overview
- Builders: Portsmouth Naval Shipyard; Mare Island Naval Shipyard; Ingalls Shipbuilding; New York Shipbuilding; General Dynamics Electric Boat
- Operators: United States Navy
- Preceded by: Skipjack class
- Succeeded by: Sturgeon class
- Built: 1958–1967
- In commission: 1961–1996
- Completed: 14
- Lost: 1
- Retired: 13

General characteristics
- Type: Nuclear submarine
- Displacement: 3,750 long tons (3,810 t) surfaced; 4,300 long tons (4,369 t) submerged
- Length: 278 ft 5 in (84.86 m)
- Beam: 31 ft 7 in (9.63 m)
- Draft: 25 ft 2 in (7.67 m)
- Propulsion: 1 S5W PWR; 2 steam turbines, 15,000 shp (11 MW); 1 shaft
- Speed: 15 knots (28 km/h; 17 mph) surfaced; 28 knots (52 km/h; 32 mph) submerged
- Range: Unlimited, except by food supplies
- Test depth: 1,300 ft (400 m)
- Complement: 112
- Sensors & processing systems: BQQ-2 sonar (later BQQ-5); Mark 113 Fire-control system (later Mark 117); Periscopes
- Electronic warfare & decoys: ESM
- Armament: 4 × 21 inch (533 mm) torpedo tubes amidships; 12-18 × Mark 37 torpedoes, later replaced by Mark 48s; 4-6 × UUM-44 SUBROC anti-submarine missiles; 4 × UGM-84 Harpoon anti-ship missiles

The Permit-class submarine (known as the Thresher class until the lead boat USS Thresher was lost) was a class of fourteen nuclear-powered fast attack submarines (hull classification symbol SSN) in service with the United States Navy from the early 1960s until 1996. They were a significant improvement on the Skipjack class, with greatly improved sonar, diving depth, and silencing. They were the forerunners of all subsequent US Navy SSN designs. They served from the 1960s through to the early 1990s, when they were decommissioned due to age. They were followed by the Sturgeon and Los Angeles classes.

The Thresher class was one of several results from a study commissioned in 1956 by Chief of Naval Operations (CNO) Admiral Arleigh Burke. In "Project Nobska", the Committee on Undersea Warfare of the United States National Academy of Sciences, collaborating with numerous other agencies, considered the lessons of submarine warfare and anti-submarine warfare learned from various prototypes and experimental platforms. The design was managed under project SCB 188.

== Design ==
The new class kept the proven S5W reactor plant from the immediately preceding Skipjacks, but were a radical change in many other ways. The Threshers had the large bow-mounted sonar sphere and angled, amidships torpedo tubes used in the concurrently-built Tullibee. This placed the sonar sphere in the optimum position for detection of targets at long range. Tullibee was an alternate design optimized for anti-submarine warfare, much smaller and slower than the Threshers and with a quiet turbo-electric propulsion system. Although they used the same HY-80 steel (yield strength 80,000 psi (550 MPa)) as the Skipjacks, the Threshers' pressure hulls were made using an improved design that extended test depth to 1,300 ft (400 m). The engineering spaces were also redesigned, with the turbines supported on "rafts" that were suspended from the hull on isolation mounts for acoustic quieting. Drag was reduced, with external fittings kept to a minimum and the sail greatly reduced in size.

The small sail of Thresher (the smallest fitted to an American SSN) compensated for the increased drag of the longer hull, giving Thresher a top speed of 33 knots (61 km/h; 38 mph), the same as the Skipjacks, according to one recollection. However, the small sail had disadvantages as well, including room for only one periscope and a reduced number of electronics masts, less convenient surfaced operation in rough seas, and an increased possibility of "broaching" (inadvertent surfacing) at periscope depth in rough seas.

Only Thresher was fitted with a five-bladed symmetric screw, very similar to the ones originally fitted to the Skipjacks, which allowed her to reach this speed. During trials of the Skipjack class, it was found that the propeller produced noise below cavitation depth. It was determined that the source of this noise, called blade-rate, was the blades of the screw vibrating when they hit the wake of the sail and control surfaces. This produced a noise that could carry for many miles and could be used by an enemy submarine to set up a firing solution because the frequency of blade-rate was directly related to the speed of the submarine (the RPM of the screw). The solution was to either make the screw smaller so it did not hit the wakes of the sail and control surfaces, which would cavitate more easily because of its increased speed, or have a large screw that gently interacted with these areas of disturbed water. The latter solution was chosen for all subsequent American SSNs. Permit and later submarines of this class had seven-bladed skewback screws, which reduced the problem of blade-rate, but reduced the submarines' top speed to 29–28 knots (54–52 km/h; 33–32 mph). Jack was designed with counter-rotating screws, each of which were smaller than the standard seven-bladed screw, as an alternative solution to the blade-rate problem.

The class received mid-life upgrades in the late 1970s and 1980s, including the AN/BQQ-5 sonar suite with a retractable towed array, Mk 117 torpedo fire control equipment, and other electronics upgrades.

== Armament ==
The boats had their torpedo tubes moved to the middle of the hull and angled outboard. This made available the required large space in the bow for the BQQ-2 (BQQ-5 as modernized from the late 1970s) sonar sphere, a new and powerful low-frequency detection sensor. Initially armed with Mark 37 torpedoes, by the late 1960s they carried the improved Mark 48 and the nuclear UUM-44 SUBROC short-range anti-submarine missile, replacing up to six Mk 48s. The Threshers were the first class fitted with the Mark 113 fire control system that enabled the use of SUBROC; they were later upgraded with the Mark 117 system. In the late 1970s the UGM-84 Harpoon anti-ship missile was introduced; typically four were carried in place of Mk 48s.

The maximum weapons load was 23 torpedoes/missiles or, theoretically, up to 42 Mk 57, Mk 60, or Mk 67 mines. Any mix of mines, torpedoes, and missiles could be included.

== Construction ==
The first submarine commissioned in the class was the ill-fated Thresher, and so the class was known by her name. When Thresher was lost on 10 April 1963, the class took the name of the second ship in the class, Permit. Thresher had numerous advanced design features and embodied the future of US Navy submarine design, and her loss was a serious blow. As a result, the SUBSAFE program was instituted to correct design flaws and introduce strict manufacturing and construction quality control in critical systems. The seawater and main ballast systems of future classes (Sturgeon-class SSNs and Benjamin Franklin-class SSBNs) were redesigned, and some Threshers and other submarines were rebuilt to SUBSAFE standards. SUBSAFE includes specific training of SUBSAFE quality assurance inspectors in the engineering crew, and tracks extremely detailed information about every component of a submarine that is subject to sea pressure. Joints in any equipment carrying seawater must be welded (not brazed), and every hull penetration larger than a specified size can be quickly shut by a remote hydraulic mechanism. The program has been very successful, as no SUBSAFE submarines have been lost as of 2023 (Scorpion was not SUBSAFE).

Flasher, Greenling, and Gato were designed under project SCB 188M and were fitted with a larger sail, to house additional masts, and built 13 feet 9 inches longer than the other units of the class to include more SUBSAFE features, additional reserve buoyancy, more intelligence gathering equipment and improved accommodations. Haddock was completed with the larger sail but the standard 279-foot (85 m) hull.

The engine room of Jack was lengthened by 10 feet (3.0 m) to accommodate an experimental direct-drive propulsion system using concentric counter-rotating propellers. Although counter-rotating propellers produced impressive gains in speed on the experimental Albacore, in Jack the results were disappointing because of the difficulty in sealing the shaft. Jack was also used to test polymer ejection that could reduce flow noises that degraded sonar performance.

== Boats in class ==
The gaps in the hull number sequence were taken by the unique Tullibee, and the George Washington, Ethan Allen, and Lafayette-class fleet ballistic missile submarine classes.

Name	Hull number	Builder	Laid Down	Launched	Commissioned	Decommissioned	Period of service	Fate	
Thresher	SSN-593	Portsmouth Naval Shipyard	28 May 1958	9 Jul 1960	3 Aug 1961	—N/a	1.7	10 Apr 1963	Lost with 129 crewmembers and shipyard personnel 200 nautical miles (370 km) east of Cape Cod, Massachusetts, exact cause unknown.
Permit	SSN-594	Mare Island Naval Shipyard	16 Jul 1959	1 Jul 1961	29 May 1962	12 Jun 1991	29.0	20 May 1993	Disposed (Note: Recycled via the nuclear Ship-Submarine Recycling Program.)
Plunger	SSN-595	Mare Island Naval Shipyard	2 Mar 1960	9 Dec 1961	21 Nov 1962	3 Jan 1990	27.0	8 Mar 1996	Disposed
Barb	SSN-596	Ingalls Shipbuilding, Pascagoula, Mississippi	9 Nov 1959	11 Feb 1962	24 Aug 1963	20 Dec 1989	26.3	14 Mar 1996	Disposed
Pollack	SSN-603	New York Shipbuilding, Camden, New Jersey	14 Mar 1960	17 Mar 1962	26 May 1964	1 Mar 1989	24.8	17 Feb 1995	Disposed
Haddo	SSN-604	New York Shipbuilding, Camden, New Jersey	9 Sep 1960	18 Aug 1962	16 Dec 1964	12 Jun 1991	26.4	20 Jun 1992	Disposed
Jack	SSN-605	Portsmouth Naval Shipyard	16 Sep 1960	24 Apr 1963	31 Mar 1967	11 Jul 1990	23.3	30 Jun 1992	Disposed
Tinosa	SSN-606	Portsmouth Naval Shipyard	24 Nov 1959	9 Dec 1961	17 Oct 1964	15 Jan 1992	27.3	15 Aug 1992	Disposed
Dace	SSN-607	Ingalls Shipbuilding, Pascagoula, Mississippi	6 Jun 1960	18 Aug 1962	4 Apr 1964	2 Dec 1988	24.7	1 Jan 1997	Disposed
Guardfish	SSN-612	New York Shipbuilding, Camden, New Jersey	13 Feb 1961	15 May 1965	20 Dec 1966	2 Feb 1992	25.0	9 Jul 1992	Disposed
Flasher	SSN-613	Electric Boat	14 Apr 1961	22 Jun 1963	22 Jul 1966	26 May 1992	25.8	11 May 1994	Disposed
Greenling	SSN-614	Electric Boat	15 Aug 1961	4 Apr 1964	3 Nov 1967	18 Apr 1994	26.4	30 Sep 1994	Disposed
Gato	SSN-615	Electric Boat	15 Dec 1961	14 May 1964	25 Jan 1968	25 Apr 1996	28.2		Disposed
Haddock	SSN-621	Ingalls Shipbuilding, Pascagoula, Mississippi	24 Apr 1961	21 May 1966	22 Dec 1967	7 Apr 1993	25.3		Disposed

== See also ==
- List of submarines of the United States Navy
- List of submarine classes of the United States Navy
- Ship Characteristics Board § USS Thresher loss
