= USS Jack (SSN-605) =

Submarine of the United States

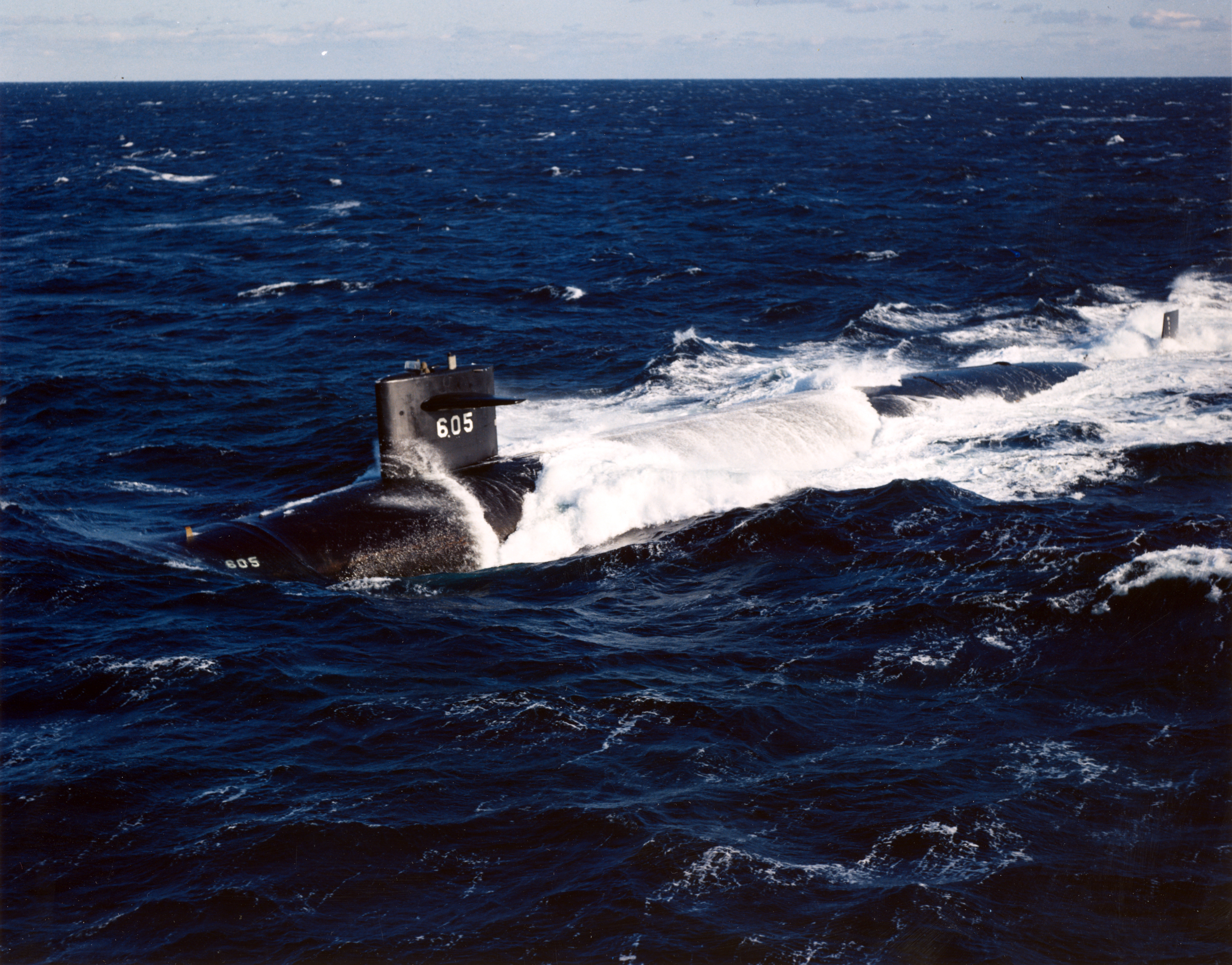
- USS Jack (SSN-605), probably during sea trials off New England in 1967.

History

United States
- Name: USS Jack
- Namesake: The jack, a name of various types of fish
- Ordered: 13 March 1959
- Builder: Portsmouth Naval Shipyard
- Laid down: 16 September 1960
- Launched: 24 April 1963
- Sponsored by: Mrs. Grace Groves
- Commissioned: 31 March 1967
- Decommissioned: 11 July 1990
- Stricken: 11 July 1990
- Motto: We try harder!
- Fate: Ship-Submarine Recycling Program completed 30 June 1992

General characteristics
- Class & type: Permit-class submarine
- Displacement: 3,968 tons surfaced
- Length: 297 ft 4 in (90.63 m)
- Beam: 31 ft 7 in (9.63 m)
- Draft: 25 ft 4 in (7.72 m)
- Propulsion: S5W reactor
- Speed: More than 20 knots (37 km/h; 23 mph)
- Complement: 95 officers and men
- Armament: 4 × 21 in (533 mm) torpedo tubes

USS Jack (SSN-605), a Permit-class submarine in commission from 1967 to 1990, was the second ship of the United States Navy to be named for the jack, a name of fish applied to any young pike, large California rockfish, or green pike or pickerel. She saw extensive service during the Cold War.

== Construction and commissioning ==
The contract to build Jack was awarded to Portsmouth Naval Shipyard in Kittery, Maine, on 13 March 1959 and her keel was laid down there on 16 September 1960. She was launched on 24 April 1963, sponsored by Mrs. Grace Groves, the wife of Lieutenant General Leslie R. Groves, who had been the head of the Manhattan Project. She was commissioned on 31 March 1967. The principal speaker at her commissioning ceremony was Rear Admiral James F. Calvert, USN, who served with distinction in the Pacific during World War II on Jack's predecessor, the submarine USS Jack (SS-259).

=== Unique silencing features ===
Jack was a variation on the standard Permit-class design. She was 20 feet (6.1 m) longer than her sisters and used an experimental direct-drive plant with two contra-rotating propellers on concentric shafts. This allowed the propellers to be smaller and thus make less noise (termed blade rate) when interacting with the hull's uneven wake, with no loss of thrust. It was judged that the specialized turbine and extra shaft watertight packing required by this solution was less effective than the alternative adopted on the other Permits: a much larger, scythe-shaped or skew-shaped propeller that interacted with the wake more slowly (another possible solution was the pump-jet, which would be adopted on the later Seawolf-class).

== Operational history ==
=== 1982–1990 ===
Near the end of September 1982, Jack went to Portsmouth Naval Shipyard in Kittery, Maine for a 27-month overhaul. In April 1983, while in dry dock, she suffered a casualty. While conducting a hydrostatic test of the oxygen banks, the shipyard was using Freon (R-12) as the fluid to conduct the test (the Freon would leave no residue and potential contamination in the O2 banks upon evaporation after the test). One of the shipyard workers was unable to get out of the engineering space in time, and succumbed to the oxygen deprivation effects of the Freon and was not able to be revived.

Jack was formally decommissioned and stricken from the naval register on 11 July 1990. Ex-Jack was then sent to Washington state to be disposed of by the Ship-Submarine Nuclear Recycling Program, 'dying' on 30 June 1992.

== See also ==
Other submarines with unique silencing features

- USS Tullibee (SSN-597)
- USS Narwhal (SSN-671)
- USS Glenard P. Lipscomb (SSN-685)
