= USS Dace (SSN-607) =

United States Navy submarine

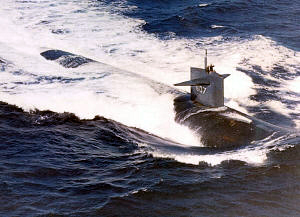

History

United States
- Name: USS Dace
- Namesake: The dace, any of various freshwater fishes
- Awarded: 3 March 1959
- Builder: Ingalls Shipbuilding
- Laid down: 6 June 1960
- Launched: 18 August 1962
- Sponsored by: Betty Ford
- Commissioned: 4 April 1964
- Decommissioned: 2 December 1988
- Stricken: 2 December 1988
- Fate: Recycling via Ship-Submarine Recycling Program completed 1 January 1997

General characteristics
- Class & type: Permit-class submarine
- Displacement: 3,070 tons surfaced, 3,500 tons submerged
- Length: 278 ft 5 in (84.86 m)
- Beam: 31 ft 8 in (9.65 m)
- Draft: 25 ft 2 in (7.67 m)
- Propulsion: S5W reactor
- Speed: 15 knots (28 km/h; 17 mph) surfaced; greater than 20 knots (37 km/h; 23 mph) submerged
- Test depth: Deeper than 400 feet (120 m)
- Complement: 105 officers and men
- Sensors & processing systems: BQQ5
- Armament: 4 × 21 in (530 mm) torpedo tubes SUBROC
- Notes: YUK 27 FC

USS Dace (SSN-607), a Permit-class submarine, was the second ship of the United States Navy to be named for the dace, any of several small North American fresh-water fishes of the carp family. The contract to build her was awarded to Ingalls Shipbuilding in Pascagoula, Mississippi on 3 March 1959 and her keel was laid down on 6 June 1960. She was launched on 18 August 1962, sponsored by Betty Ford, wife of future President of the United States Gerald Ford, and commissioned on 4 April 1964.

History from 1964 to 1988 needed.

Dace was decommissioned and stricken from the Naval Vessel Register on 2 December 1988. Ex-Dace entered the Nuclear Powered Ship and Submarine Recycling Program in Bremerton, Washington and on 1 January 1997 ceased to exist.

== See also ==
- Admiral Kinnaird R. McKee, USN, who commanded USS Dace.
