= USS Permit (SSN-594) =

Submarine of the United States

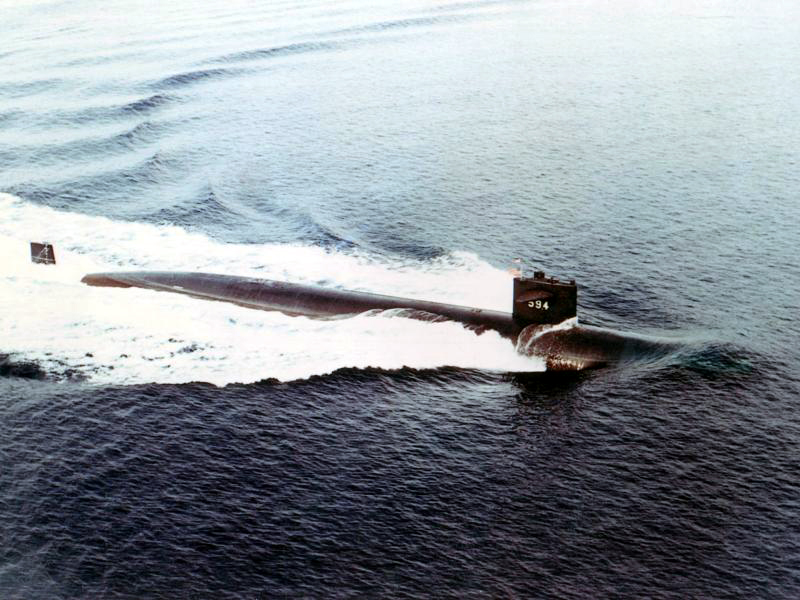
- USS Permit (SSN-594)

History

United States
- Name: USS Permit
- Namesake: Permit
- Ordered: 27 January 1958
- Builder: Mare Island Naval Shipyard, Vallejo, California
- Laid down: 1 May 1959
- Launched: 1 July 1961
- Commissioned: 29 May 1962
- Decommissioned: 23 July 1991
- Stricken: 23 July 1991
- Fate: Entered Ship-Submarine Recycling Program, 30 September 1991

General characteristics
- Class & type: Thresher/Permit-class submarine
- Displacement: 3,700 long tons (3,759 t) surfaced; 4,300 long tons (4,369 t) submerged
- Length: 278 ft 5 in (84.86 m)
- Beam: 31 ft 7 in (9.63 m)
- Draft: 25 ft 2 in (7.67 m)
- Propulsion: 1 S5W PWR; 2 steam turbines, 15,000 shp (11 MW); 1 shaft
- Speed: 20 knots (37 km/h; 23 mph)+ surfaced
- Test depth: 1,300 ft (400 m)
- Complement: 105 officers and men
- Armament: 4 × 21 in (533 mm) torpedo tubes; SUBROC

USS Permit (SSN-594) became the lead ship of her class of submarines when the former lead ship, Thresher (SSN-593) was lost. She was the second ship of the United States Navy to be named for the permit, a game fish found in waters from North Carolina to Brazil.

The contract to build her was awarded to Mare Island Naval Shipyard on 27 January 1958, and her keel was laid down on 1 May 1959. She was launched on 1 July 1961, sponsored by Mrs. John A. McCone, and commissioned on 29 May 1962.

== Service history ==
She spent five weeks of trials in the Puget Sound area, and then three weeks at Mare Island for checkout of the SUBROC missile system. Off the California coast in spring 1962, about 30 mi (50 km) west of the Golden Gate, she collided with the hull of the Matson freighter Hawaiian Citizen on 9 May, damaging both vessels, which caused a change of command. During late summer and early fall, Permit underwent shakedown in the San Diego area. After final acceptance trials in January 1963, she participated in a thorough evaluation of the SUBROC missile, and on 28 March, became the first submarine to successfully fire one. During 1964 and 1965, Permit engaged in more testing and training of an advanced nature.

Permit underwent an overhaul at Mare Island during the winter of 1966. From May to July, she deployed to WestPac, and after a short stop at Pearl Harbor, returned to San Diego on 13 August. She spent the remainder of the year operating in local waters.

The submarine underwent overhaul at Mare Island in 1967. During this period, her homeport was changed to nearby Vallejo. By late November, Permit was ready for trials in Puget Sound, and a return to San Diego on 12 December. The boat operated off San Diego until 22 April, then departed for special operations in the Pacific, which lasted until 26 June. From 24 July to 1 October, she was engaged in another special assignment. Permit then resumed local operations off San Diego. On Sept7,1967 film footage of Permit surfacing was seen during the airing of the pilot episode of (The Flying Nun).

In late 1982, the submarine USS La Jolla collided with the surface-operating USS Permit at periscope depth about 30 miles off San Francisco. La Jolla sustained minor damage to its rudder and left a 10-by-3-foot scratch in the paint on Permit's keel.

Permit was decommissioned and stricken from the Naval Vessel Register on 23 July 1991. Ex-Permit entered the nuclear-powered Ship and Submarine Recycling Program in Bremerton, Washington, on 30 September 1991, and on 20 May 1993, ceased to exist.
