= USS Thresher (SSN-593) =

United States Navy submarine (1961–63)

Coordinates: 41°46′N 65°03′W

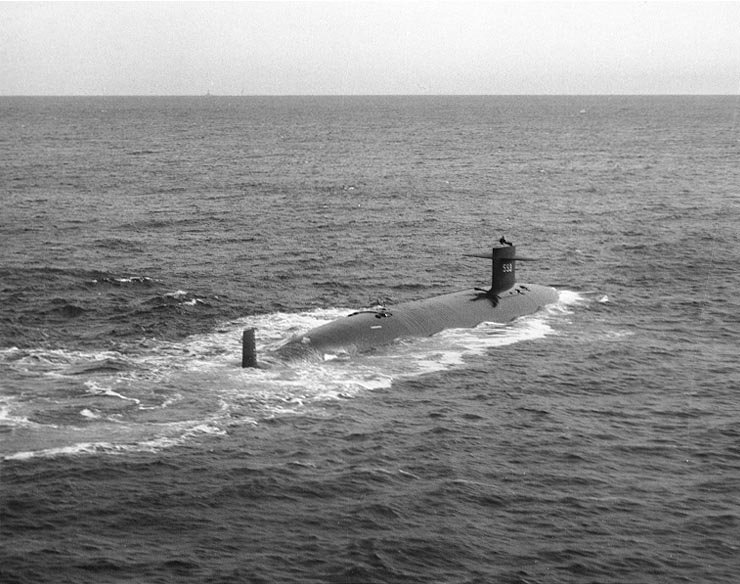
- USS Thresher (SSN-593) under way, 30 April 1961

History

United States
- Name: Thresher
- Namesake: Thresher shark
- Ordered: 15 January 1958
- Builder: Portsmouth Naval Shipyard
- Laid down: 28 May 1958
- Launched: 9 July 1960
- Commissioned: 3 August 1961
- Stricken: 10 April 1963
- Motto: Vis Tacita (Silent Strength)
- Fate: Lost with all hands during deep diving tests, 10 April 1963; 129 died

General characteristics
- Class & type: Permit-class submarine
- Displacement: 3,540 short tons (3,210 t) light, 3,770 short tons (3,420 t) submerged
- Length: 279 ft (85 m)
- Beam: 32 ft (9.8 m)
- Draft: 26 ft (7.9 m)
- Propulsion: 1 Westinghouse S5W PWR, Westinghouse Geared Turbines 15,000 shp (11 MW)
- Speed: 33 knots (61 km/h; 38 mph)
- Complement: 16 officers, 96 enlisted
- Armament: 4 × 21 in (530 mm) torpedo tubes amidships

USS Thresher (SSN-593) was the lead boat of her class of nuclear-powered attack submarines in the United States Navy. She was the U.S. Navy's second submarine to be named after the thresher shark.

On 10 April 1963, Thresher sank during deep-diving tests about 350 km (220 mi) east of Cape Cod, Massachusetts, killing all 129 crew and shipyard personnel aboard. Her loss was a watershed moment for the U.S. Navy, leading to the implementation of a rigorous submarine safety program known as SUBSAFE. The first nuclear submarine lost at sea, Thresher was also the third of four submarines lost with more than 100 people aboard, the others being the French Surcouf, sinking with 130 personnel in 1942, USS Argonaut, lost with 102 aboard in 1943, and Russian Kursk, which sank with 118 aboard in 2000.

== Significance of design and loss ==
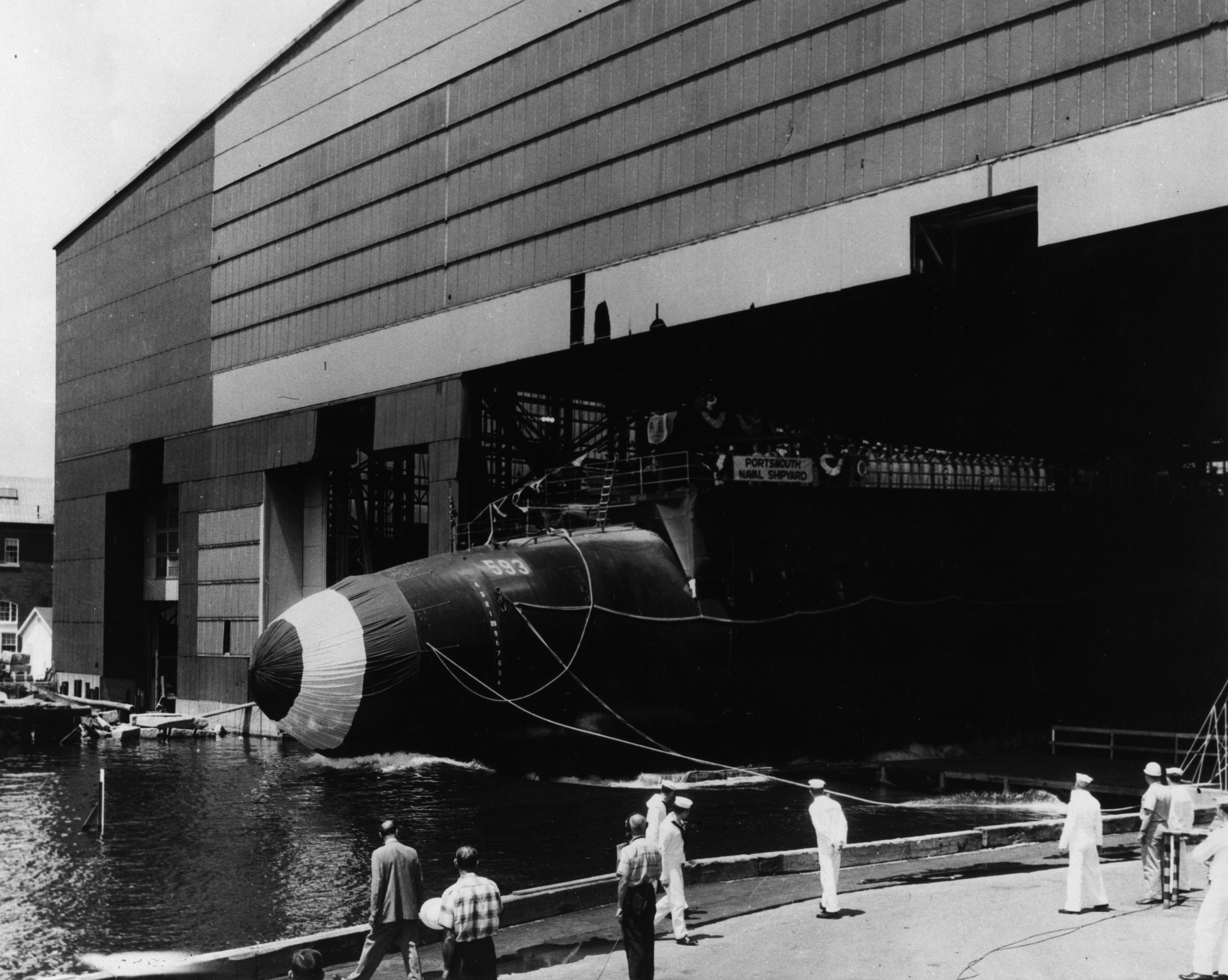
Launch of USS Thresher

Created to find and destroy Soviet submarines, Thresher was the fastest and quietest submarine of its day, matching the smaller, contemporary Skipjack class. She also had the most advanced weapons system, including launchers for the U.S. Navy's newest anti-submarine missile, the SUBROC, as well as passive and active sonar that could detect vessels at unprecedented ranges. Shortly after her loss, the Commander of Submarine Force Atlantic wrote in the March 1964 issue of the U.S. Naval Institute's monthly journal Proceedings that "the Navy had depended upon this performance to the extent that it had asked for and received authority to build 14 of these ships, as well as an additional 11 submarines with very much the same characteristics. This was the first time since World War II that we had considered our design sufficiently advanced to embark upon construction of a large class of general-purpose attack submarines."

Following Navy tradition, this class of subs was originally named Thresher after the lead boat. When Thresher was struck from the Naval Vessel Register on 10 April 1963, the class name was changed to that of the second boat, Permit. Having been lost at sea, Thresher was not decommissioned by the U.S. Navy and remains on "Eternal Patrol".

== Early career ==
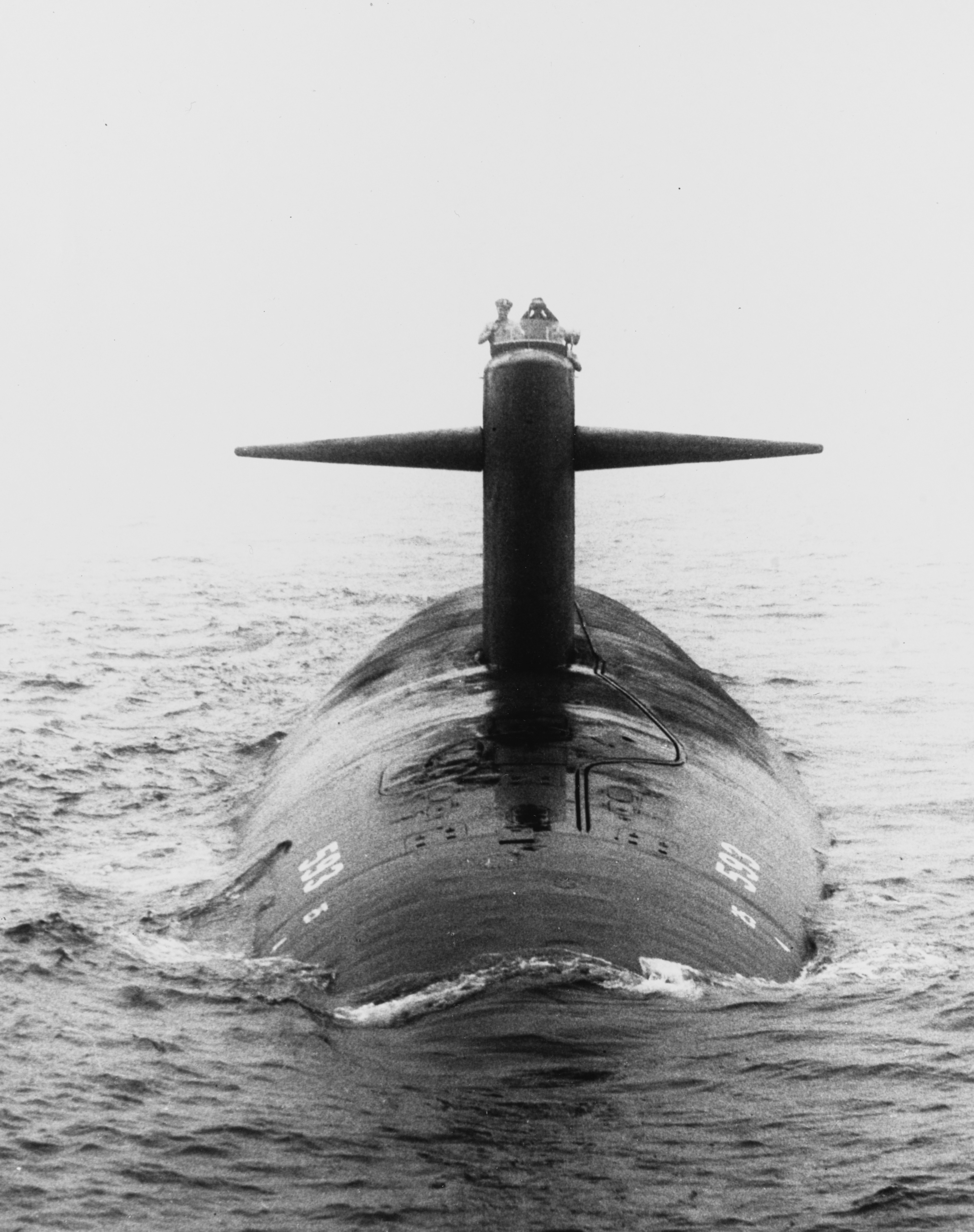
Thresher at sea on 24 July 1961

The contract to build Thresher was awarded to Portsmouth Naval Shipyard on 15 January 1958, and her keel was laid on 28 May 1958. She was launched bow first on 9 July 1960, was sponsored by Mary B. Warder (wife of World War II skipper Frederick B. Warder), and was commissioned on 3 August 1961, Commander Dean L. Axene commanding.

Thresher conducted lengthy sea trials in the western Atlantic and Caribbean Sea areas in 1961–1962. These tests allowed a thorough evaluation of her many new and complex technological features and weapons. She took part in Nuclear Submarine Exercise (NUSUBEX) 3–61 off the northeastern coast of the United States from 18–24 September 1961.

On 18 October 1961, Thresher headed south on a three-week test and training cruise to San Juan, Puerto Rico, in company with the diesel-electric submarine Cavalla, arriving 2 November. Her reactor was shut down in accordance with standard procedure while in port. No shore power connection was available in San Juan, so the ship's backup diesel generator was used to carry the "hotel" electrical loads. Several hours later, the backup generator broke down and the electrical load was transferred to the ship's battery. Most of the battery power was needed to keep vital systems operating and to restart the reactor, so lighting and air conditioning were shut down. Without air conditioning, temperature and humidity in the submarine rose, reaching 60 °C (140 °F) after about 10 hours. The crew attempted to repair the diesel generator (four men received Navy commendation medals for their work that night). It became apparent that the generator could not be fixed before the battery was depleted, so the crew tried to restart the reactor, but the remaining battery charge was insufficient. The captain returned to the ship from a shore function just after the battery ran down. The crew eventually borrowed cables from another ship in the harbor and connected them to the adjacent Cavalla, which started her diesels and provided enough power to allow Thresher to restart her reactor.

Thresher conducted further trials and fired test torpedoes before returning to Portsmouth on 29 November 1961. The boat remained in port through the end of the year, and spent the first two months of 1962 with her sonar and SUBROC systems under evaluation. In March, she participated in NUSUBEX 2–62 (an exercise designed to improve the tactical capabilities of nuclear submarines) and in anti-submarine warfare training with Task Group ALPHA.

Off Charleston, South Carolina, Thresher undertook operations supporting development of the SUBROC anti-submarine missile. She returned briefly to New England waters, after which she proceeded to Florida for more SUBROC tests. While moored at Port Canaveral, Florida, the submarine was struck by a tug, which damaged one of her ballast tanks. Repairs were made at Groton, Connecticut, by the Electric Boat Company, and Thresher then went south for more tests and trials off Key West, Florida, before returning northward. The submarine entered Portsmouth Shipyard on 16 July 1962 to begin a scheduled six-month post-shakedown availability to examine systems and make repairs and corrections as necessary. The work took longer than expected, lasting nearly nine months. The ship was finally recertified and undocked on 8 April 1963.

== Sinking ==
On 9 April 1963, Thresher left Kittery, Maine, at 8 a.m. under command of Lieutenant Commander John Wesley Harvey. She met with the submarine rescue ship Skylark at 11 a.m. to begin her initial post-overhaul dive trials in an area 190 nmi (350 km) east of Cape Cod, Massachusetts. That afternoon, Thresher conducted an initial trim-dive test, surfaced, and then performed a second dive to half of her 1,300-foot (400-meter) test depth. Thresher had been to her test depth about 40 times before entering the shipyard in late 1962. She remained submerged overnight and re-established underwater communications with Skylark at 6:30 a.m. on 10 April to commence deep-dive trials. Following standard practice, Thresher slowly dived deeper as she traveled in circles under Skylark to remain within communications distance, pausing every 100 ft (30 m) of depth to check the integrity of all systems. As Thresher neared her test depth, Skylark received garbled communications over underwater telephone indicating "minor difficulties, have positive up-angle, attempting to blow", and then a final, even more garbled message that included the number "900". Skylark received no further communication, and surface observers gradually realized that a problem had occurred.

By mid-afternoon, 15 Navy ships were en route to the search area. At 6:30 p.m., the commander of Submarine Force Atlantic sent word to Portsmouth Naval Shipyard to begin notifying the crew's family members, starting with Commander Harvey's wife Irene, that Thresher was missing.

Chief of Naval Operations Admiral George W. Anderson Jr. went before the press corps at the Pentagon to announce that the submarine was lost with all hands. President John F. Kennedy ordered all flags to be flown at half mast from 12 to 15 April in honor of the 129 lost submariners and shipyard personnel.

== Search and recovery ==
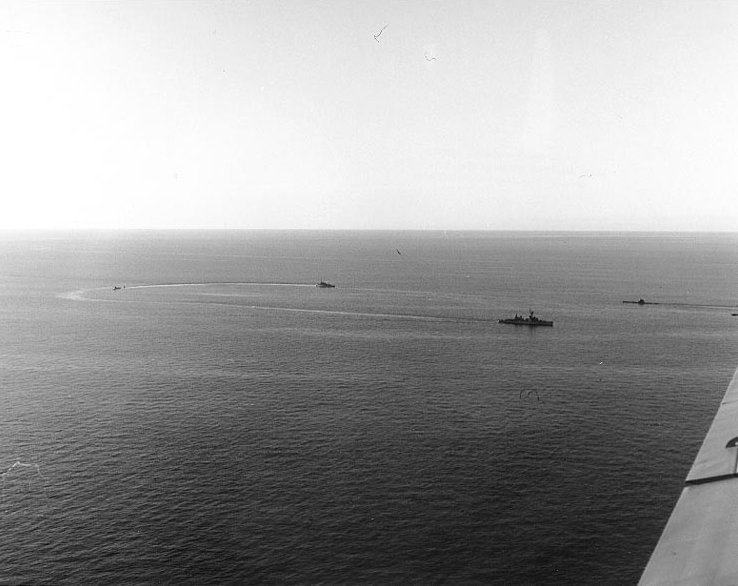
Search operations underway near the accident site, 15 April 1963

By morning on 11 April, submarines USS Seawolf and USS Sea Owl, both operating near Thresher's location, were ordered to join in the search for the missing submarine. The Navy quickly mounted an extensive search with surface ships and support from the Naval Research Laboratory (NRL), with its deep-search capability. The laboratory's small acoustic research vessel Rockville, with a unique trainable search sonar, left on 12 April 1963 for the search area. Rockville was to be followed by other personnel with a deep-camera system. Allegheny, Mission Capistrano, and Prevail became engaged in a close sonar search of an area 10 nmi (19 km; 12 mi) square. Atlantis II, Robert D. Conrad, and James M. Gilliss investigated likely contacts found in the sonar search. The NRL deep-towed camera system and personnel later operated from James M. Gilliss with some success, finding debris later confirmed to be from Thresher. The bathyscaphe Trieste was alerted on 11 April and brought from San Diego to Boston. It was deployed for two series of dives into the debris field; the first taking place from 24 to 30 June, and the second from late August until early September. The equipment-handling capability of Gilliss proved inadequate, even hazardous, to handle the towed vehicle, and the entire search was paused in September.

The inadequacy of the existing small Auxiliary General Oceanographic Research (AGOR) vessels such as James M. Gilliss for handling deep-towed search vehicles led to a search for a vessel of a size and configuration that could handle such equipment in a sheltered area. In late 1963, that search resulted in the acquisition of Mizar, with the intent to eventually add a sheltered center well for deploying equipment.

The 1964 search included Mizar (with partial modifications but not a center well), Hoist, and Trieste II, Trieste's successor. That submersible incorporated parts of the original bathyscaphe and was completed in early 1964. The bathyscaphe was placed on board USNS Private Francis X. McGraw and shipped to Boston. Mizar did have a system called Underwater Tracking Equipment (UTE) by which it could track its towed vehicle, and it was planned for use to track Trieste. Before her departure from NRL in Washington, Mizar was equipped with highly sensitive proton magnetometers furnished by the instrument division of Varian Associates in Palo Alto. In use, the magnetometers were suspended on an electrical line that also towed underwater video cameras.

Mizar sailed on 25 June to begin the deep search and found the wreck within two days. The shattered remains of Thresher's hull were on the sea floor, about 8,400 feet (2,600 m) below the surface, in five major sections. Most of the debris had spread over an area of about 33 acres (134,000 m^{2}). Major sections of Thresher, including the sail, sonar dome, bow section, engineering spaces section, operations spaces section, and the stern planes were found. By 22 July, most of the lost submarine had been photographed. In early August, the entire task force returned to the area with the submersible. Its first two dives were unsuccessful, but on the third dive, the UTE enabled placement of Trieste II on the wreck, at first not seeing wreckage because the bathyscaphe was sitting upon it.

Trieste II was commanded by Lieutenant John B. Mooney Jr., with co-pilot Lieutenant John H. Howland and Captain Frank Andrews, in an operation that recovered parts of the wreckage in September 1964.

On 9 July 2021, the United States Navy declassified the narrative of the submarine Seawolf during the search for Thresher. Seawolf detected acoustic signals at 23.5 kHz and 3.5 kHz as well as metal banging noises which were interpreted at the time as originating from Thresher. However, after the commander of Task Group 89.7 ordered that echo ranging and fathometers be secured so as to not interfere with the search, no further acoustic signals were detected by Seawolf other than those originating from other searching ships and the submarine Sea Owl. Ultimately, the Court of Inquiry determined:

That while operating as a unit of the search force, the U.S.S. Seawolf (SSN575) recorded possible electronic emissions and underwater noises. None of the signals which SEAWOLF received equated with anything that could have been originated by human beings.

== Cause ==
Deep-sea photography, recovered artifacts, and an evaluation of Thresher's design and operational history permitted a court of inquiry to conclude that the submarine had probably suffered the failure of a salt-water piping system joint that relied heavily on silver brazing instead of welding, causing a leak. Earlier tests using ultrasound equipment found potential problems with about 14% of the tested brazed joints, most of which were determined not to pose a risk significant enough to require repair. But on 30 November 1960, nearly three years prior to the accident, USS Barbel suffered such a silver-braze joint failure near test depth while on an exercise, flooding the engine room with an estimated 18 tons of water in the 3 minutes it took to surface under power and with blown tanks. This incident was followed months later by more silver-braze failures aboard the ballistic missile submarine USS Abraham Lincoln during trials. High-pressure water spraying from a broken pipe joint may have shorted out one of the many electrical panels, causing a shutdown ("scram") of the reactor, which in turn caused loss of propulsion.

The inability to blow the ballast tanks was later attributed to excessive moisture in the submarine's high-pressure air flasks, moisture that froze and plugged the flasks' flowpaths while passing through the valves. This was later simulated in dockside tests on Thresher's sister sub, Tinosa. During a test to simulate blowing ballast at or near test depth, ice formed on strainers installed in valves; the flow of air lasted only a few seconds. Air dryers were later retrofitted to the high-pressure air compressors, beginning with Tinosa, to permit the emergency blow system to operate properly. Submarines typically rely on speed and deck angle (angle of attack) rather than deballasting to surface; they are propelled at an angle toward the surface. Ballast tanks were almost never blown at depth, as doing so could cause the submarine to rocket to the surface out of control. Normal procedure was to drive the submarine to periscope depth, raise the periscope to verify that the area was clear, and then blow the tanks and surface the submarine.

Subsequent study of SOSUS (sound surveillance system) data from the time of the incident has given rise to doubts as to whether flooding preceded the reactor scram, as no impact sounds of the high pressure water in the compartments of the submarine could be detected on instrument recordings from SOSUS at the time. Such flooding would have caused a significant sonic event, and the recorded data yielded no such evidence.

At the time, reactor-plant operating procedures did not allow for a rapid reactor restart following a scram, or even the ability to use steam remaining in the secondary system to propel the submarine to the surface. After a scram, standard procedure was to isolate the main steam system, cutting off the flow of steam to the turbines providing propulsion and electricity. This was done to prevent an overly rapid cool-down of the reactor. Thresher's reactor control officer, Lieutenant Raymond McCoole—a "mustang" with years of submarine service in enlisted status, serving as a chief petty officer aboard the first nuclear submarine, USS Nautilus (SSN-571), before becoming a commissioned officer—was not on the boat during the fatal dive; his trainee, Jim Henry, fresh from nuclear power school, probably followed standard operating procedures and gave the order to isolate the steam system after the scram, even though Thresher was at or slightly below its maximum depth. Once closed, the large steam system isolation valves could not be reopened quickly. Reflecting on the situation in later life, McCoole was sure that he would have delayed shutting the valves, thus allowing the boat to "answer bells" and drive itself to the surface, despite the flooding in the engineering spaces. Admiral Rickover noted that the procedures were for normal operating conditions, and not intended to restrict necessary actions in an emergency involving the safety of the ship. After the accident Rickover further reduced plant restart times, which had already been gradually improving with new technology and operating experience, in addition to limiting factors that could cause a shutdown.

In a dockside simulation of flooding in the engine room, held before Thresher sailed, the watch in charge took 20 minutes to isolate a simulated leak in the auxiliary seawater system. At test depth with the reactor shut down, Thresher would not have had 20 minutes to recover. Even after isolating a short circuit in the reactor controls, it would have taken nearly 10 minutes to restart the plant.

It was believed at the time that Thresher likely imploded at a depth of 1,300–2,000 ft (400–610 m), though 2013 acoustic analysis concluded implosion occurred at 2,400 ft (730 m).

== Later events ==
The aftermath of the public relations aspect of this major disaster has since been part of various case studies.

The U.S. Navy has periodically monitored the environmental conditions of the site since the sinking and has reported the results in an annual public report on environmental monitoring for U.S. naval nuclear-powered craft. These reports provide results of the environmental sampling of sediment, water, and marine life, which is performed to ascertain whether Thresher's nuclear reactor has had a significant effect on the deep-ocean environment. The reports also explain the methodology for conducting deep-sea monitoring from both surface vessels and submersibles. The monitoring data confirm that there has been no significant effect on the environment. Nuclear fuel in the submarine remains intact.

Information declassified in the 2008 National Geographic Documentary Titanic: Ballard's Secret Mission shows that USNR Commander Robert Ballard, the oceanographer credited with locating the wreck of RMS Titanic, was sent by the Navy on a mission under cover of the search for Titanic to map and collect visual data on the wrecks of both Thresher and USS Scorpion. Ballard had approached the Navy in 1982 for funding to find Titanic with his new deep-diving robot submersible. The Navy conditionally granted him the funds on condition that the submarine wrecks were surveyed before Titanic. Ballard's robotic survey showed that the depth at which Thresher had sunk caused implosion and total destruction; the only recoverable piece was a foot of mangled pipe. His 1985 search for Scorpion revealed a large debris field "as though it had been put through a shredding machine". His obligation to inspect the wrecks completed, and with the radioactive threat from both established as small, Ballard then searched for Titanic. Financial limitations allowed him 12 days to search, and the debris-field search technique he had used for the two submarines was successfully applied to locate Titanic.

Almost all records of the court of inquiry remain unavailable to the public. In 1998, the Navy began declassifying them, but decided in 2012 that it would not release them to the public. In February 2020, in response to a FOIA lawsuit by military historian James Bryant, a federal court ordered the Navy to begin releasing documents by May 2020.

On 22 May 2020, the Navy stated in a court-mandated status report that due to the ongoing COVID-19 pandemic, the Navy's Undersea Warfare Division (OPNAV N97) had placed the records review on hold as N97 staff were limited to supporting mission-essential tasks supporting undersea forces and operations only. However, the Navy stated that they "will return to the review and process of Plaintiff's FOIA request once the office is able to expand beyond mission-essential capabilities". Following the release of the 18 July 2020, court-mandated report, the Navy stated that they had identified and approved additional resources and reservists to begin processing the documents in August. The Navy began a rolling release of the records on 23 September 2020.

== Disaster sequence of 10 April 1963 ==
Time-accelerated sequence of probable events during the disaster

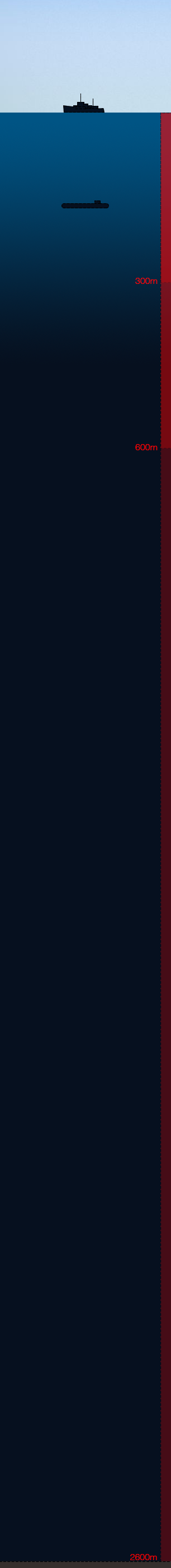
A diagram (roughly to scale) of the depth of the ocean where the incident and loss of Thresher took place

Timeline of the Thresher disaster
Time (EST)	Event
07:47	Thresher begins its descent to the test depth of 1,300 ft (400 m).
07:52	Thresher levels off at 400 ft (120 m), contacts the surface, and the crew inspects the ship for leaks. None are found.
08:09	Commander Harvey reports reaching half the test depth.
08:25	Thresher reaches 1,000 ft (300 m).
09:02	Thresher is cruising at just a few knots (submarines normally move slowly and cautiously at great depths, lest a sudden jam of the diving planes sends the ship below test depth in a matter of seconds). The boat is descending in slow circles, and announces to Skylark she is turning to "Corpen [course] 090". At this point, transmission quality from Thresher begins to noticeably degrade, possibly as a result of thermoclines.
09:09	The Navy's official investigation stated the likelihood of a brazed pipe-joint rupturing in the engine room at about this time. The crew would have attempted to stop the leak; at the same time, the engine room would be filling with a cloud of mist. Under the circumstances, Commander Harvey's likely decision would have been to order full speed, full rise on the fairwater planes, and blowing main ballast in order to surface. The pressurized air rapidly expanding in the pipes cools down, condensing moisture and depositing it on temporary strainers installed in the system to protect the moving parts of the valves during new construction (which should have been removed prior to sea trials); in only a few seconds, the moisture freezes, clogging the strainers and blocking the air flow, halting the effort to blow ballast. Water leaking from the broken pipe most likely causes short circuits, leading to an automatic shutdown of the ship's reactor and a loss of propulsion. The logical action at this point would have been for Harvey to order propulsion shifted to a battery-powered backup system. As soon as the flooding was contained, the engine room crew would have begun to restart the reactor, an operation that would be expected to take at least seven minutes.
09:12	Skylark pages Thresher on the underwater telephone: "Gertrude underwater telephone check, K [over]." With no immediate response (although Skylark is still unaware of the conditions aboard Thresher), the signal "K" is repeated twice.
09:13	Harvey reports status via underwater telephone. The transmission is garbled, though some words are recognizable: "[We are] experiencing minor difficulty, have positive up-angle, attempting to blow." One hypothesis has the submarine growing heavier from water flooding the engine room, and continuing its descent, probably tail-first. Another attempt to empty the ballast tanks is performed, again failing because of the formation of ice. Officers on Skylark can hear the hiss of compressed air over the loudspeaker at this point.
09:14	Skylark acknowledges with a brisk "Roger, out," awaiting further updates from the SSN. A follow-up message, "No contacts in area," is sent to reassure Thresher that she can surface quickly, without fear of collision, if required.
09:15	Skylark queries Thresher about her intentions: "My course 270 degrees. Interrogative range and bearing from you." There is no response, and Skylark's captain, Lieutenant Commander Hecker, sends his own Gertrude underwater telephone message to the submarine, "Are you in control?"
09:16	Skylark picks up a garbled transmission from Thresher, transcribed in the ship's log as "900 N." The meaning of this message is unclear, and was not discussed at the inquiry; it may have indicated the submarine's depth and course, or it may have referred to a navy "event number" (1000 indicating loss of submarine), with the "N" signifying a negative response to the query from Skylark, "Are you in control?"
09:17	A second transmission is received, with the partially recognizable phrase "exceeding test depth ... " The (hypothetical) leak from the broken pipe grows with increased pressure.
09:18	Skylark detects a high-energy, low-frequency noise, characteristic of an implosion.
09:20	Skylark continues to page Thresher, repeatedly calling for a radio check, a smoke bomb, or some other indication of the boat's condition.
11:04	Skylark attempts to transmit a message to COMSUBLANT (Commander, Submarines, Atlantic Fleet): "Unable to communicate with Thresher since 0917R. Have been calling by UQC voice and CW, QHB, CW every minute. Explosive signals every 10 minutes with no success. Last transmission received was garbled. Indicated Thresher was approaching test depth ... Conducting expanding search." Radio problems meant that COMSUBLANT did not receive and respond to this message until 12:45. Hecker initiated "Event SUBMISS [loss of a submarine]" procedures at 11:21, and continued to repeatedly hail Thresher until after 17:00.

During the 1963 inquiry, Admiral Hyman Rickover stated:

I believe the loss of the Thresher should not be viewed solely as the result of failure of a specific braze, weld, system or component, but rather should be considered a consequence of the philosophy of design, construction and inspection that has been permitted in our naval shipbuilding programs. I think it is important that we re-evaluate our present practices where, in the desire to make advancements, we may have forsaken the fundamentals of good engineering.

== Alternative theory of the sinking: electrical failure ==
On 8 April 2013, Bruce Rule, US Office of Naval Intelligence lead acoustic analyst for over 42 years, published his own analysis of the data collected by USS Skylark and Atlantic SOSUS arrays in a paper in the Navy Times. Rule based his analysis on SOSUS data that was highly classified in 1963, was not discussed in open session of the Court of Inquiry and was not revealed at the congressional hearings. A retired Navy captain and former commanding officer of the same class of submarine as Thresher, citing Rule's findings, has called for the U.S. government to declassify the data associated with the boat's sinking, and presented an alternative disaster sequence based upon the acoustic data.

Rule concluded that the primary cause of the sinking was a failure of the electrical bus that powered the main coolant pumps. According to Rule, SOSUS data indicates that after two minutes of electrical instability, the bus failed at 09:11 a.m., causing the main coolant pumps to trip off. This caused an immediate reactor scram, resulting in a loss of propulsion. Thresher could not be deballasted because ice had formed in the high-pressure air pipes, and so she sank. Rule's analysis holds that flooding (whether from a silver brazed joint or anywhere else) played no role in the reactor scram or the sinking, and that Thresher was intact until she imploded. In addition to the SOSUS data that does not record any sound of flooding, the crew of Skylark did not report hearing any noise that sounded like flooding, and Skylark was able to communicate with Thresher, despite the fact that, at test depth, even a small leak would have produced a deafening roar. Additionally, the previous commander of Thresher testified that he would not have described flooding, even from a small-diameter pipe, as a "minor problem".

Rule interprets the communication "900" from Thresher at 09:17 a.m. as a reference to test depth, signifying that Thresher was 900 feet (270 m) below her test depth of 1,300 feet (400 m), or 2,200 feet (670 m) below sea level. According to Rule the SOSUS data indicates an implosion of Thresher at 09:18:24, at a depth of 2,400 feet (730 m), 400 feet (120 m) below her predicted collapse depth. The implosion took 0.1 seconds, too fast for the human nervous system to perceive.

== SUBSAFE legacy ==
When the Court of Inquiry delivered its final report, it recommended that the Navy implement a more rigorous program of design review and safety inspections during construction. That program, launched in December 1963, was known as SUBSAFE. From 1915 to 1963, the U.S. Navy lost a total of 16 submarines to non-combat accidents. Since the inception of SUBSAFE only one submarine has suffered a similar fate, and that was USS Scorpion, which sank in 1968 for reasons still undetermined. Scorpion was not SUBSAFE-certified.

== Memorials ==
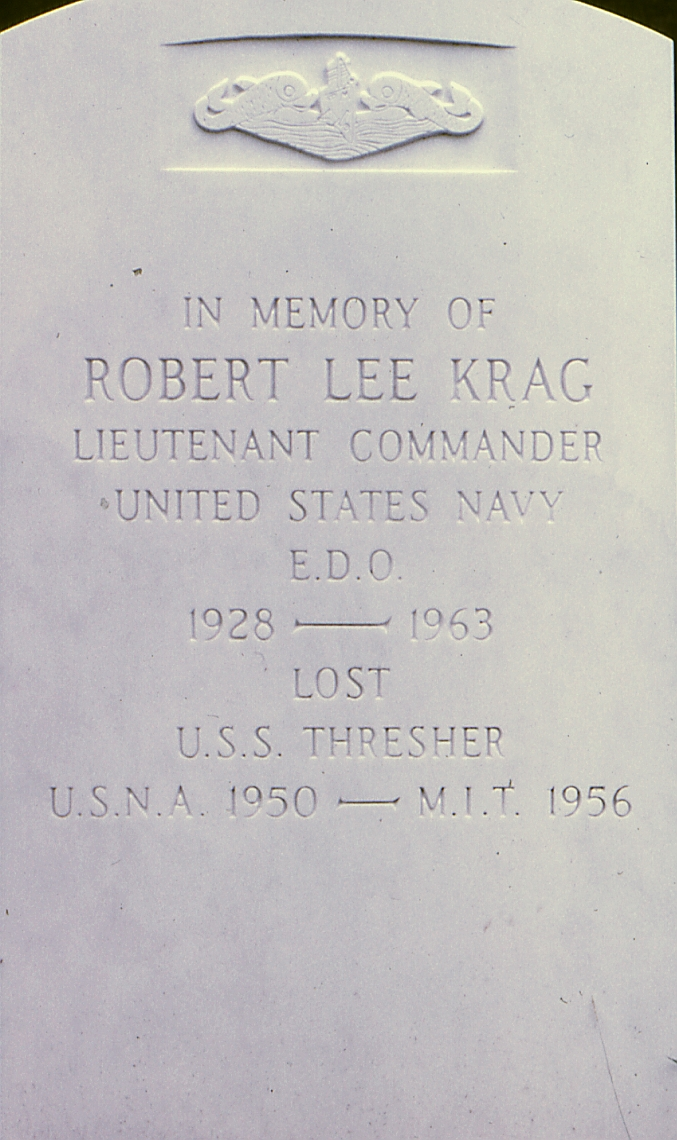
Memorial stone for a lost USS Thresher sailor, Arlington National Cemetery, July 1967

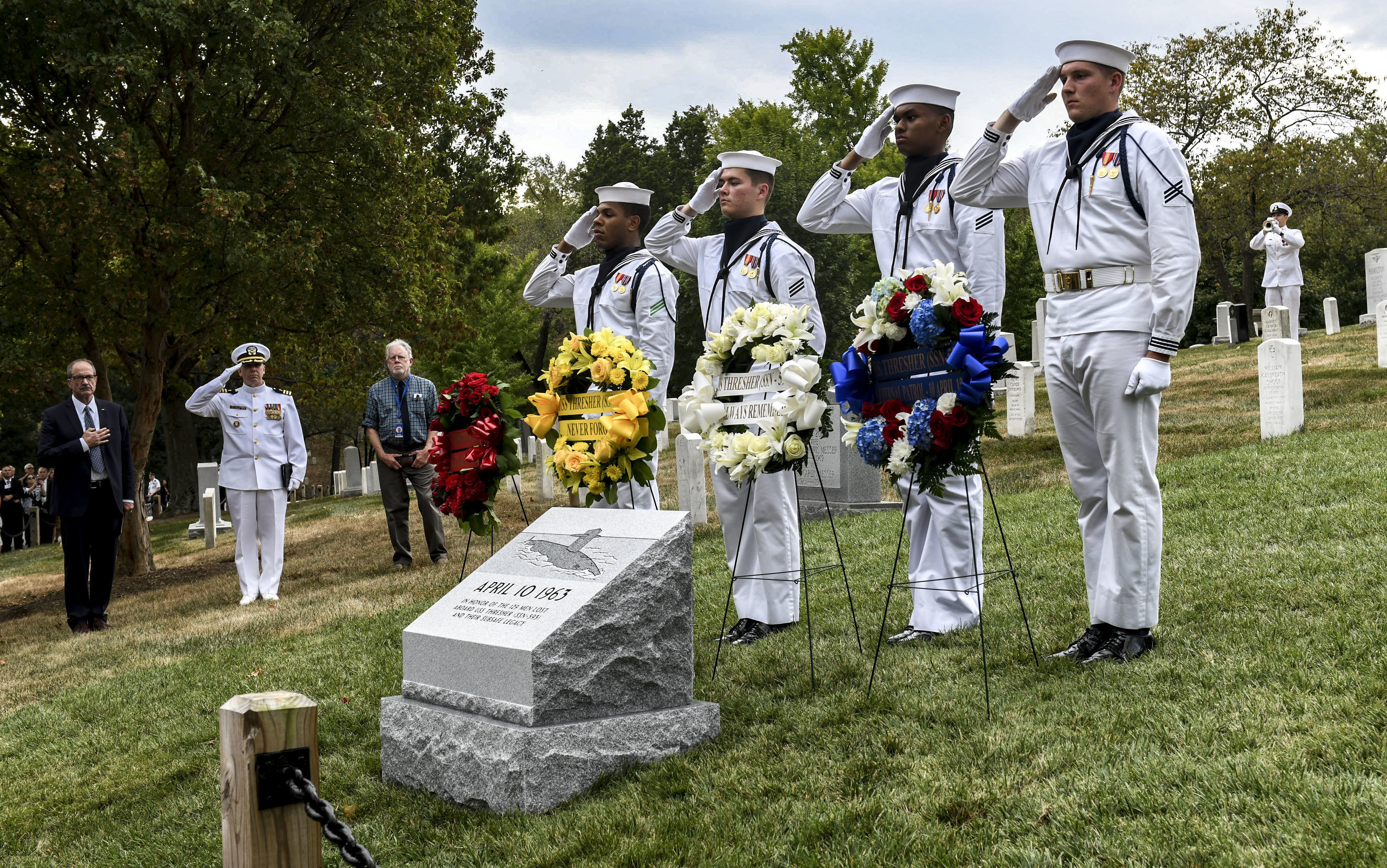
USS Thresher memorial dedication at Arlington National Cemetery, 26 September 2019

=== Permanent ===
- The chapel at Portsmouth Navy Yard, where the submarine was built, was renamed Thresher Memorial Chapel.
- In Portsmouth, New Hampshire, there is a stone memorial with a plaque honoring all who were lost on Thresher. It is outside the Albacore museum.
- Just outside the main gate of the Naval Weapons Station, Seal Beach, California, a Thresher–Scorpion Memorial honors the crews of the two submarines.
- In Eureka, Missouri, there is a marble stone at the post office on Thresher Drive honoring the "officers and crew of the USS Thresher, lost 10 April 1963."
- Salisbury, Massachusetts, named Robert E. Steinel Memorial Park in honor of Thresher crewman and Salisbury resident Sonarman First Class Robert Edwin Steinel.
- In Nutley, New Jersey, there is a monument to Thresher crewmember Pervis Robison Jr.
- In Denville, New Jersey, there is a monument to Thresher crewmember Robert D. Kearney at the Gardner Field recreation area.
- Thresher Avenue, named for the submarine, serves a residential area in Naval Base Kitsap in Washington state.
- A 129-foot (39 m) flagpole at Kittery Memorial Circle in the town of Kittery, Maine, was dedicated on 7 April 2013, the 50th anniversary of the loss of Thresher, to honor the 129 lost souls.
- There is a Thresher monument in Memorial Park next to the Kittery Town Hall.
- There is a memorial monument to the submariners lost in Thresher and Scorpion located on Patriot's Point Road in Mount Pleasant, South Carolina.
- Naval Submarine Base New London in Groton, Connecticut, named an enlisted barracks "Thresher Hall" after the submarine, and mounted a plaque in its lobby displaying the names of the crew members, shipyard government employees and contractors that were lost.
- A commemorative monument was dedicated in Arlington National Cemetery on 26 September 2019.
- A commemorative plaque was placed on a WW II memorial boulder at the base of a flagpole at the marina in Malba, NY, honoring local Thresher seaman Richard K. Fisher and the others lost on the Thresher.

Former

- In Carpentersville, Illinois, the Dundee Township Park District named a swimming facility (later closed and demolished) in honor of Thresher.

=== Other ===
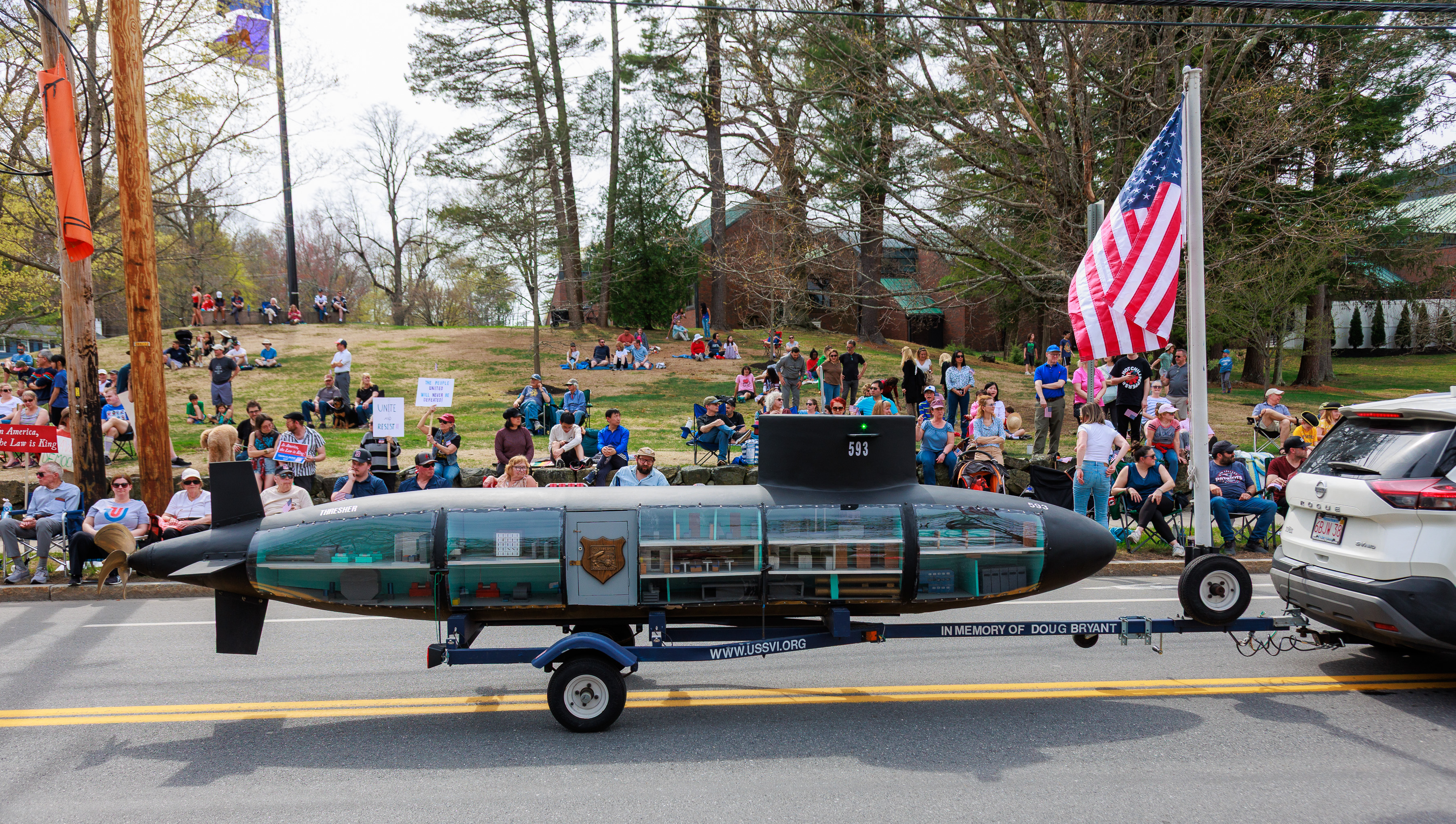
A cutaway model of the Thresher is used as a parade float by the United States Submarine Veterans in Massachusetts.

- On 12 April 1963, President John F. Kennedy issued Executive Order 11104 paying tribute to the crew of Thresher by ordering all national flags to half-staff.
- Five folk music groups or artists have produced songs memorializing Thresher: "Ballad Of The Thresher" by The Kingston Trio, "The Thresher Disaster" by Tom Paxton; "The Thresher" by Phil Ochs on his 1964 album All the News That's Fit to Sing, "The Thresher" by Pete Seeger, and "Thresher" by Shovels & Rope.
- "The Fear-Makers", an episode in the 1964 season of the television series Voyage to the Bottom of the Sea, is inspired by the loss of the USS Thresher. Anthony Wilson, a writer for the series, was fascinated by the loss of the USS Thresher (and with 'fear gas' as an incapacitating chemical weapon aboard the submarines, an agent similar to the contemporary BZ gas), and he wrote a teleplay for the series. In Wilson's teleplay, the submarine, Seaview, searches for a missing submarine, Polidor.

== See also ==
- Deep Submergence Rescue Vehicle
- USS Scorpion (SSN-589), the only other American nuclear-powered submarine to be lost at sea
- John P. Craven, a key individual in the search for Thresher
- Kursk submarine disaster, next-largest loss of life on a submarine
- List of sunken nuclear submarines
- List of lost United States submarines
- List of disasters in Massachusetts by death toll
- George Whelan Anderson Jr. § USS Thresher loss
- Ship Characteristics Board § USS Thresher loss
- USS Toro (SS-422) § USS Thresher role
