= USS Gato (SSN-615) =

Thresher/Permit-class nuclear submarine of the US Navy (in service 1968-96)

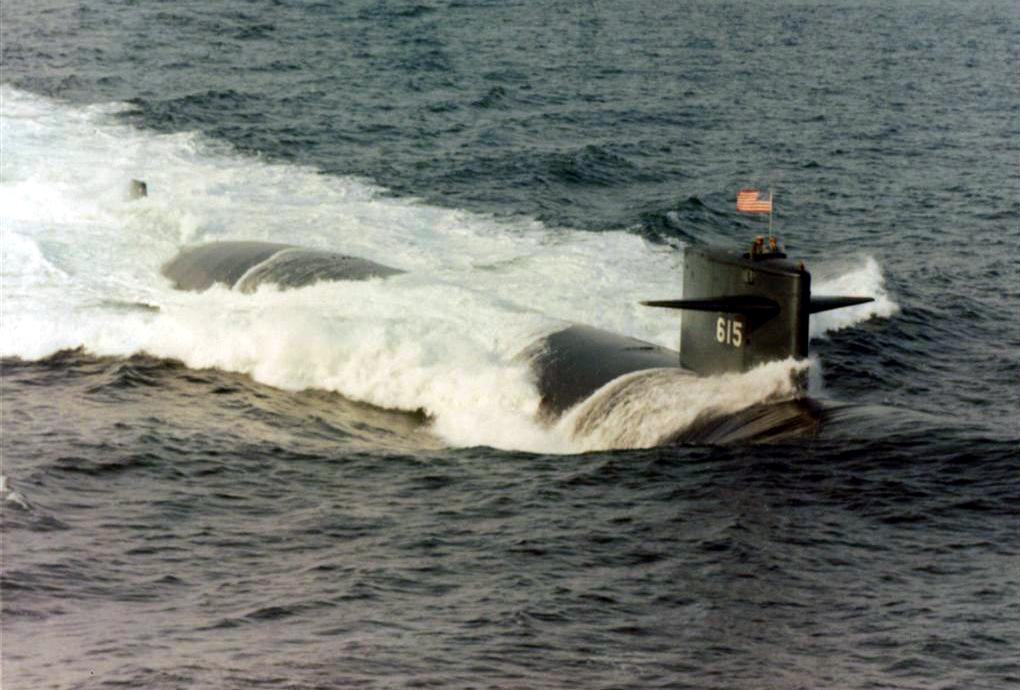
- USS Gato (SSN-615)

History

United States
- Name: USS Gato
- Namesake: The gato, a species of small catshark
- Ordered: 9 July 1960
- Builder: General Dynamics Electric Boat
- Laid down: 15 December 1961
- Launched: 14 May 1964
- Sponsored by: Mrs. Lawson P. Ramage
- Commissioned: 25 January 1968
- Decommissioned: 25 April 1996
- Nickname(s): 'The Goal Keeper"; "The Black Cat"
- Fate: Disposed of via Ship-Submarine Recycling Program
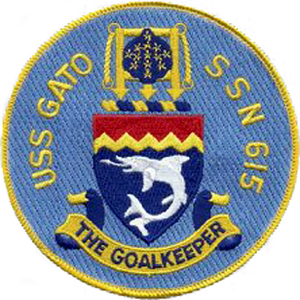
- Badge: SSN-615 ship patch

General characteristics
- Class & type: Thresher/Permit-class nuclear submarine
- Displacement: 3964 tons light, 4242 tons full, 278 tons dead
- Length: 292 ft (89 m)
- Beam: 32 ft (9.8 m)
- Draft: 28 ft (8.5 m)
- Propulsion: S5W reactor with S3G-3 Core, two steam turbines with reduction-geared single shaft
- Complement: 12 officers, 115 men
- Armament: 4 × 21 in (533 mm) torpedo tubes amidships, MK-37 and MK-48 torpedoes, MK-67 SLMM, UGM-84 Harpoon cruise missiles, SUBROC short-range ballistic missile

USS Gato (SSN-615) was a Thresher/Permit-class nuclear submarine known as the "Goal Keeper" or the "Black Cat." She was the second United States Navy ship named after the gato, a species of small catshark found in waters along the west coast of Mexico.

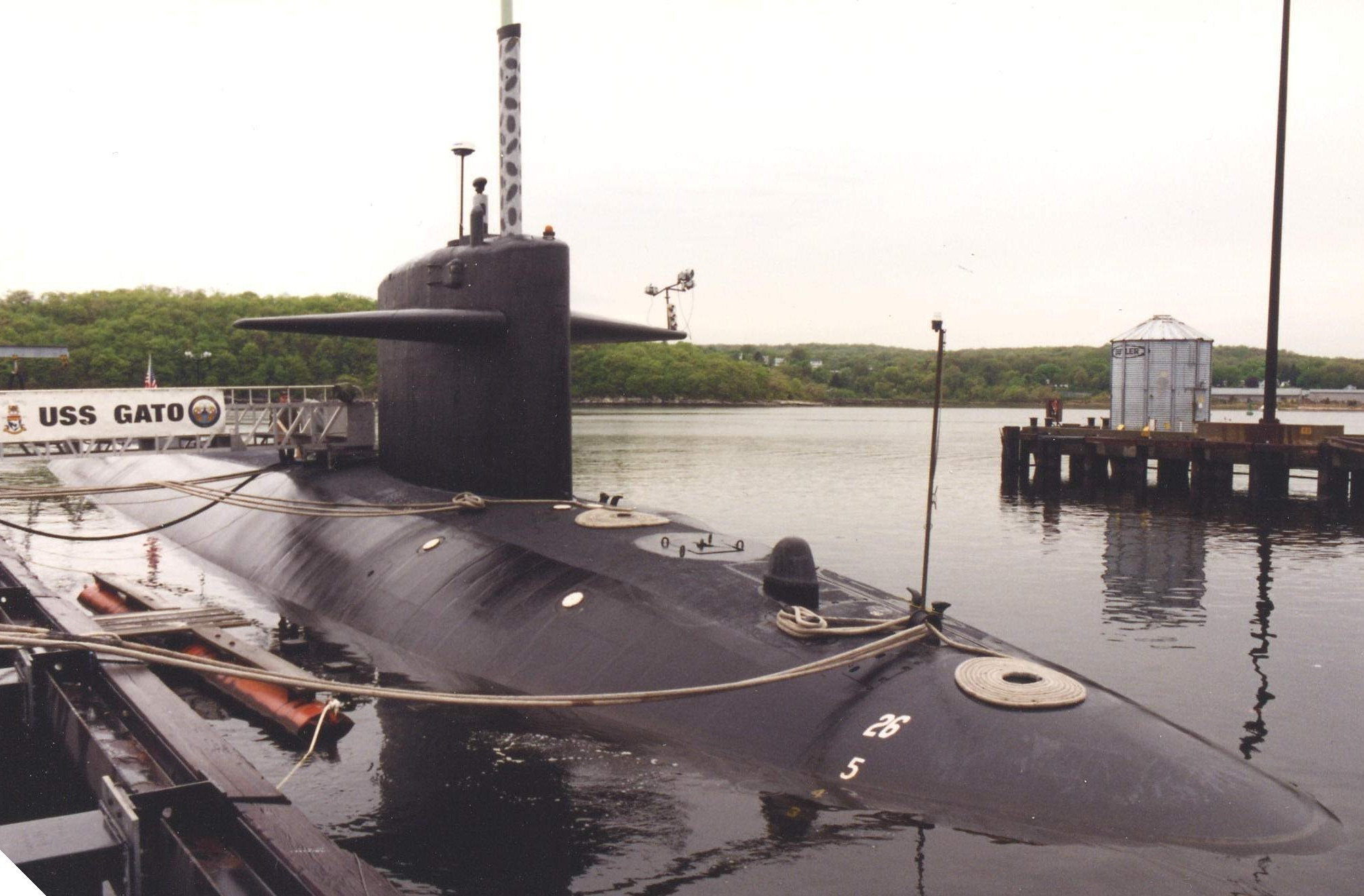
USS Gato (SSN-615)

The contract to build her was awarded to the Electric Boat Division of General Dynamics Corporation on 9 July 1960 and her keel was laid down on 15 December 1961 at Groton, Connecticut. She was launched 14 May 1964 sponsored by Mrs. Lawson P. Ramage, and was commissioned 25 January 1968 under the command of CDR Albert Baciocco.

On 15 November 1969, Gato collided with the Soviet submarine K-19 in the Barents Sea at a depth of some 200 feet (61 m). The impact completely destroyed the K-19's bow sonar systems and mangled the covers of its forward torpedo tubes. K-19 returned to port for repair but the Gato was relatively undamaged and continued her patrol.

She was the first nuclear-powered submarine to completely circumnavigate South America, and the first nuclear-powered submarine to navigate the Strait of Magellan during its 1976 Unitas run under the command of CDR Robert Partlow.

Gato was decommissioned and stricken on 25 April 1996 and disposed of by submarine recycling.
