= SS Levant Arrow =

American oil tanker (1921–1938)

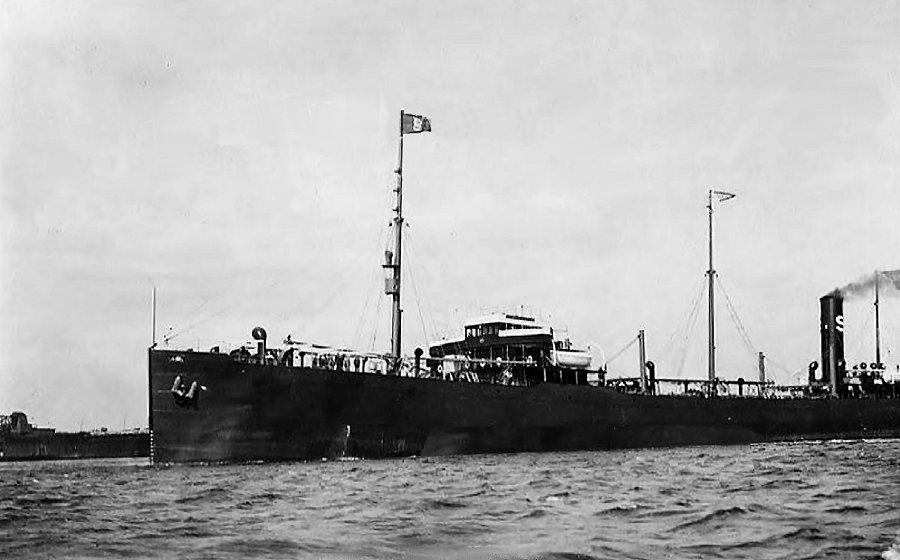
- Levant Arrow in 1929, flying the original Socony house flag from her mainmast

History
- Name: Levant Arrow
- Namesake: The Levant
- Owner: Socony (1921–1931); Socony-Vacuum (1931–1938)
- Operator: Socony (1921–1931); Socony-Vacuum (1931–1935); Standard Vacuum (1935–1938); Socony-Vacuum (1938)
- Ordered: April 1, 1920
- Yard number: 262
- Laid down: November 4, 1920
- Launched: July 25, 1921
- Acquired: October 18, 1921
- Identification: US official number: 221659; Code letters: KDVD
- Fate: Scrapped in Philadelphia, 1939, by the Northern Metals Company

General characteristics
- Class and type: Arrow-class oil tanker
- Tonnage: 8,046 GRT; 4,960 NRT
- Displacement: 17,277 t
- Length: 468.3 feet (142.7 m)
- Beam: 62.7 feet (19.1 m)
- Depth: 32.0 feet (9.8 m)
- Range: 11,100 miles (17,900 km)

SS Levant Arrow was an Arrow-class oil tanker. She served a mundane career with the Standard Oil Company of New York (Socony), operating from 1921 until 1938, when she was scrapped. She was one of two Arrow-class oil tankers not to serve in any wartime capacity, the other being Empire Arrow.

== Construction ==
Levant Arrow was built in Camden, New Jersey, by the New York Shipbuilding Corporation. She was ordered on April 1, 1920, designated hull number 262, as one of the four last Arrow-class tankers. Her keel was laid on November 4, 1920, she was launched on July 25, 1921, and was delivered on October 18. She was named after the Levant, a region in the eastern Mediterranean. She was assigned the official number 221659 and the code letters KDVD.

=== Specifications ===
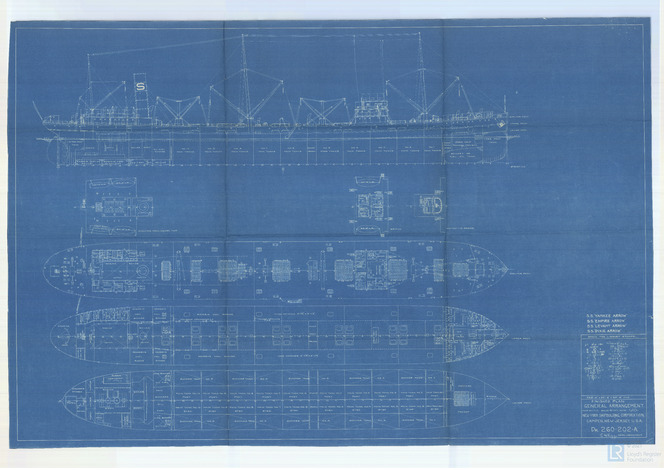
General plans for the final four Arrow-class oil tankers, including Levant Arrow

Levant Arrow was 468.3 feet (142.7 m) long, 62.7 feet (19.1 m) wide, and had a depth of 32.0 feet (9.8 m). She had a gross register tonnage of 8,046, a net register tonnage of 4,960, and a displacement of 17,277 tons. She had a cruising radius of 11,100 miles (17,900 km). Levant Arrow had three single-ended Scotch marine boilers and one 3,200 indicated horsepower engine. The engine was one cylinder, quadruple expansion, four-crank, and surface condensing. The tanker had ten double main cargo tanks capable of carrying 3,500,000 US gallons (13,000,000 L) of oil.

== Service history ==
Levant Arrow's route took her from New England, through the Panama Canal, to west coast cities like San Pedro, and then across the Pacific Ocean to Chinese ports such as Dalian. No notable incidents occurred over the course of the tanker's seventeen-year career.

She was owned by the Standard Oil Company of New York until 1931 when her ownership was transferred to Socony-Vacuum after the former merged with the Vacuum Oil Company. She was registered under the Standard Vacuum Transportation Company after 1935 and was transferred back to Socony-Vacuum in December 1938.

The tanker arrived in Philadelphia for scrapping on December 12, 1938. She was broken up by the Northern Metals Company sometime in early 1939.
