= LDNR =

LDNR may refer to:

- Luhansk People's Republic and Donetsk People's Republic, two contested regions of Ukraine
  - LDNR people's militias
- the oil tanker SS Gulflight (as identified by code letters)
- an organisation somewhat circuitously connected to Edward Francis Small
