= USS Guardfish (SSN-612) =

Submarine of the United States

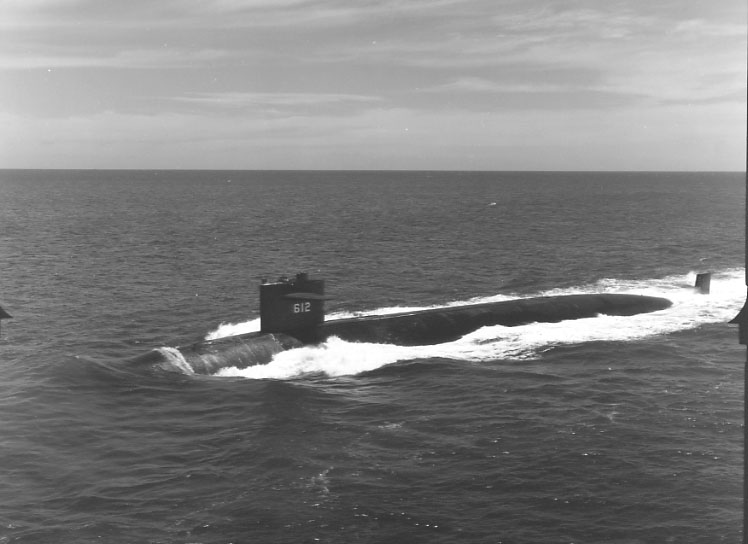

History

United States
- Name: USS Guardfish
- Namesake: The guardfish, a long and voracious fish
- Awarded: 9 June 1960
- Builder: New York Shipbuilding, Camden, New Jersey
- Laid down: 28 February 1961
- Launched: 15 May 1965
- Sponsored by: Mrs. Kenneth E. BeLieu
- Commissioned: 20 December 1966
- Decommissioned: 4 February 1992
- Stricken: 4 February 1992
- Fate: Recycled via Ship-Submarine Recycling Program, 1992

General characteristics
- Class & type: Thresher/Permit-class submarine
- Displacement: 3,700 long tons (3,759 t)
- Length: 279 ft (85 m)
- Beam: 32 ft (9.8 m)
- Draft: 29 ft (8.8 m)
- Propulsion: S5W PWR
- Speed: over 20 knots (37 km/h; 23 mph) submerged
- Range: Limited only by food crew endurance
- Test depth: 1,300 ft (400 m)
- Complement: 99 officers and men
- Armament: • 4 × 21 in (533 mm) torpedo tubes

USS Guardfish (SSN-612), a Thresher-class submarine, was the second ship of the United States Navy to be named for the guardfish, a voracious green and silvery fish with elongated pike-like body and long narrow jaws.

== Construction and career ==
The contract to build Guardfish was awarded to New York Shipbuilding Corporation in Camden, New Jersey on 9 June 1960 and her keel was laid down on 28 February 1961. She was launched on 15 May 1965, sponsored by Mrs. Kenneth E. BeLieu, wife of the Assistant Secretary of the Navy. Guardfish commissioned on 20 December 1966 under command of CDR Gulmer A. Hines Jr.

The submarine departed Camden on 15 February 1967, and commenced shakedown training, conducting exercises in the San Juan, Puerto Rico area. Upon completion of these exercises, Guardfish transited the Panama Canal and joined the United States Pacific Fleet as a unit of Submarine Squadron Seven, homeported in Pearl Harbor, Hawaii. She participated in several submarine operations in the Pacific, steaming over 40,000 miles (64,000 km) in her first year at sea.

On 24 December 1967 the submarine ran aground whilst entering Pearl Harbor at 24 knots (44.4 km/h). She was refloated by salvage teams three days later.

On 13 January 1968, Commander H. A. Benton, USN, assumed command. After conducting a variety of submarine missions and exercises including her first six-month Western Pacific deployment. In 1970 Guardfish returned to Atlantic waters to commence an overhaul at Ingalls Nuclear Shipbuilding Division, Pascagoula, Mississippi. On 4 November 1970, Commander D.C. Minton III, USN, assumed command. After overhaul, the ship returned to the Pacific as a unit of Submarine Squadron Seven. Guardfish participated in various submarine operations in the Pacific, for which she received the Navy Unit Commendation.

=== Echo II ===
During the summer of 1972 Guardfish was deployed in the Sea of Japan. On 9 May the Vietnam War was heating up as the Paris peace talks had broken down and American forces had commenced mining Haiphong and other major North Vietnamese harbors. The aim was to deny the North Vietnamese Army the advantage of being supplied by sea from their communist allies. Guardfish was alerted by message of the possibility of a Soviet naval response.

Guardfish was positioned at periscope depth near the Soviet's largest Pacific naval base. Late on the evening of 10 May a surface contact was detected standing out the channel at high speed cutting across the normal channel boundaries and heading almost directly for the waiting Guardfish. As the contact closed in the growing darkness it was visually identify as a Soviet Echo II-class missile submarine K-184. This class displaced 5,000 tons, was powered by a nuclear reactor, and carried eight Shaddock surface-to-surface missiles, which could be fired at targets up to 200 miles (320 km) away. Guardfish followed. Soon the Echo submerged and headed southeast at high speed.

During the next two days the Soviet submarine frequently slowed and spent long periods at periscope depth, probably receiving detailed orders from his naval commander. While listening for the Echo, Guardfish slowed which significantly extended her sonar detection range. To the crew's surprise and alarm they were able to detect at least two and possibly three other Soviet submarines in the area.

When the Echo II resumed its transit toward the southern exit of the Sea of Japan the commander of Guardfish broke radio silence and notified his operational commander of the situation. The Echo turned to clear this baffle area almost hourly. Frequent status reports were needed in Washington D.C. to assess the threat and intent of the Soviet forces. President Nixon and his National Security Advisor were briefed daily. Because high powered high frequency radio transmissions from Guardfish were subject to detection and location by the Soviet electronic intercept network, an alternate method of communicating was established. Navy Anti-Submarine Warfare P-3 Orion aircraft flew covert missions over Guardfish's projected location and received status reports via short range ultra high frequency radio either directly from Guardfish at periscope depth or via SLOT buoys, small expendable battery powered transmitters that could be programmed with a short message and shot out of the signal ejector while Guardfish remained at trail depth.

During this period of the trail every available submarine in the Pacific was urgently being deployed to provide protection for US aircraft carriers operating off the Vietnamese coast and to search for the other Soviet submarines. This deployment created a mutual interference problem for both Guardfish and the submarine operations staff. Once in the Philippine Sea the Echo turned southwest heading in the general direction of the Bashi Channel, the strait between Taiwan and the islands north of Luzon, Philippines. The Bashi is the usual northern entrance to the South China Sea and the skipper was sure that it was the Echo's objective, but their track continued well south of the normal course. Then the Echo slowed and came to periscope depth and went active on his fathometer on a short scale which was not suitable for the depth of water. The Echo then went deep, turned toward the Bashi Channel, and increased speed to 16 knots (30 km/h; 18 mph). After reporting this rapid course correction by slot buoy Guardfish rushed after the Soviet submarine knowing that the repositioning of US submarines would be nearly impossible on this short notice. As a precaution against collision with a US submarine the skipper changed depth to 100 meters (330 ft), a depth commonly used by Soviet submarines and one he knew US submarines would avoid. This choice was justified when Guardfish detected a US submarine clearing to the north at high speed.

On 18 May the Echo entered the South China Sea and transited to a point approximately 300 miles (480 km) off the coast of Luzon. For eight days he established a slow moving grid track which covered a rectangular patrol area approximately 700 miles (1,100 km) from U.S. carriers along the Vietnamese coast and well beyond the 200-mile range of its missiles.

While the tracking team struggled to maintain contact with the Echo, President Nixon went to Moscow for a summit meeting with Soviet's general secretary Brezhnev. During the summit National Security Advisor Henry Kissinger informed Brezhnev that the US knew the Soviets had deployed submarines and their presence so close to the Vietnamese War Zone was provocative and extremely dangerous. Within two days of this confrontation, the Soviets recalled their submarines and the Echo started north.

After transiting the Bashi Channel the Echo established a second patrol area in the Philippine Sea south of Okinawa. This area of the ocean had some of the worst possible acoustical properties. It was often crossed by merchant traffic and at night the biological noise and frequent rain showers were deafening to sonar. Contact was hard to maintain and forced Guardfish to trail at closer and closer ranges. A lengthy procedure to transfer the trail to another US submarine, just developed by the staff, was placed on the radio broadcast. While Guardfish was at periscope depth copying this urgent message, the Echo came unexpectedly to periscope depth and visually detected Guardfish. The maneuvers that followed by both Guardfish and the Echo were violent and at high speed. Holding on to an alerted contact proved to be impossible and contact with the Echo was lost. Guardfish returned to Guam on 10 June. The crew had been underway submerged for 123 days with only an eight-day refit as a break.

On 15 December 1972, Commander B.G. Balderston, USN, assumed command. On 31 March 1973, Commander W.S. Rich, USN, assumed command. On 14 August 1974, Guardfish completed her 612th successful dive. Guardfish also underwent regular overhaul at Pearl Harbor Naval Shipyard and went on WestPac. Guardfish departed Pearl Harbor, Hawaii in June 1975, to change homeports to Vallejo, California.

=== 1973 Reactor Accident ===
About 370 miles from Puget Sound sailing between Pearl Harbor and Bangor, Washington, the Guardfish suffered a leak in the primary coolant of its nuclear reactor. A crewman performing a leak test on a valve accidentally created a path for coolant to flow out from the primary loop, which circulates through the reactor core. The submarine surfaced to ventilate and decontaminate. Five crewmen were sprayed with radioactive steam and required decontamination, followed by hospital care at Puget Sound Naval Shipyard. The Navy did not publicly disclose the accident at the time and classified all records of the event.

=== Mid to late 1970s ===
On 9 July 1975, Lieutenant Commander G.H. Kannady Jr., USN, assumed command. Guardfish entered Mare Island Naval Shipyard in August 1975 for refueling, and returned to sea in July 1977, Changing homeport to San Diego, California, as an operational unit of Submarine Squadron Three. Guardfish went through a refueling / SUBSAFE overhaul at Mare Island Naval Shipyard, completing her first dive to full test depth in 1977. In January 1979, Guardfish completed a successful six-month deployment to WESTPAC and conducted special operations with one of the first digital sonar systems to deploy in the Pacific being awarded the Meritorious Unit Commendation.

On 9 February 1979, Commander R. E. Vaughan, USN, assumed command. Guardfish departed on a six-month Western Pacific Deployment in 1980 and was awarded the Meritorious Unit Commendation for operations during its deployment. From 16 to 21 May 1980 Guardfish visited the Australian Naval base HMAS Stirling in Rockingham, Western Australia, the only visit she would make to the base during her service.

=== 1980s ===
On 2 July 1982, Commander D. A. Oltraver, USN, assumed command. The ship won the ASW "E" and Communications "C" in both 1982 and 1983, and was awarded the Silver Anchor Award in the spring of 1984 for her outstanding retention program. Guardfish entered Mare Island Naval Shipyard for regular overhaul in September 1983 and completed the overhaul in August 1985.

On 24 August 1985, Commander T. W. Hack, USN, assumed command. GUARDFISH returned from a most successful six month Western Pacific Deployment in January 1987, for which she was awarded her third Navy Unit Commendation. Guardfish was also awarded the Silver Anchor Award for 1985 and 1986, and won the Submarine Squadron Three Battle Efficiency "E", ASW "A", Supply "E" and the Arleigh Burke Fleet Trophy for most improved ship in battle efficiency in the Pacific Fleet for Fiscal Year 1987.

On 7 November 1987, Commander J. B. Bryant, USN, assumed command. Guardfish conducted two Western Pacific deployments and a three-month Selective Restrictive Availability between September 1988 and October 1990. The ship earned the Deck Seamanship Award for three consecutive years, 1988 through 1990, and was awarded the Silver Anchor and Battle "E" Awards in Fiscal Year 1989.

=== 1990s and fate ===
On 17 November 1990, Commander P. M. Higgins, USN, assumed command. Guardfish conducted a Northern Pacific Deployment before changing homeport in June 1991 to the Puget Sound Naval Shipyard, Bremerton, Washington. The ship entered an inactivation availability in July 1991, and was decommissioned on 4 February 1992. Guardfish earned the Silver Dolphin flag in 1991 for Enlisted Warfare Qualification excellence.

Guardfish was decommissioned and stricken from the Naval Vessel Register on 4 February 1992. Her hulk entered the Nuclear Powered Ship and Submarine Recycling Program. Recycling was completed on 9 July 1992.
