= Empire Arrow =

Empire Arrow may refer to:

- SS Empire Arrow, built in Camden, New Jersey, in 1921 and scrapped in Philadelphia in 1939
- MV Empire Arrow, built in Sunderland in 1945 and scrapped in Kynosoura in 1981
