= Astoria Column =

- U.S. National Register of Historic Places
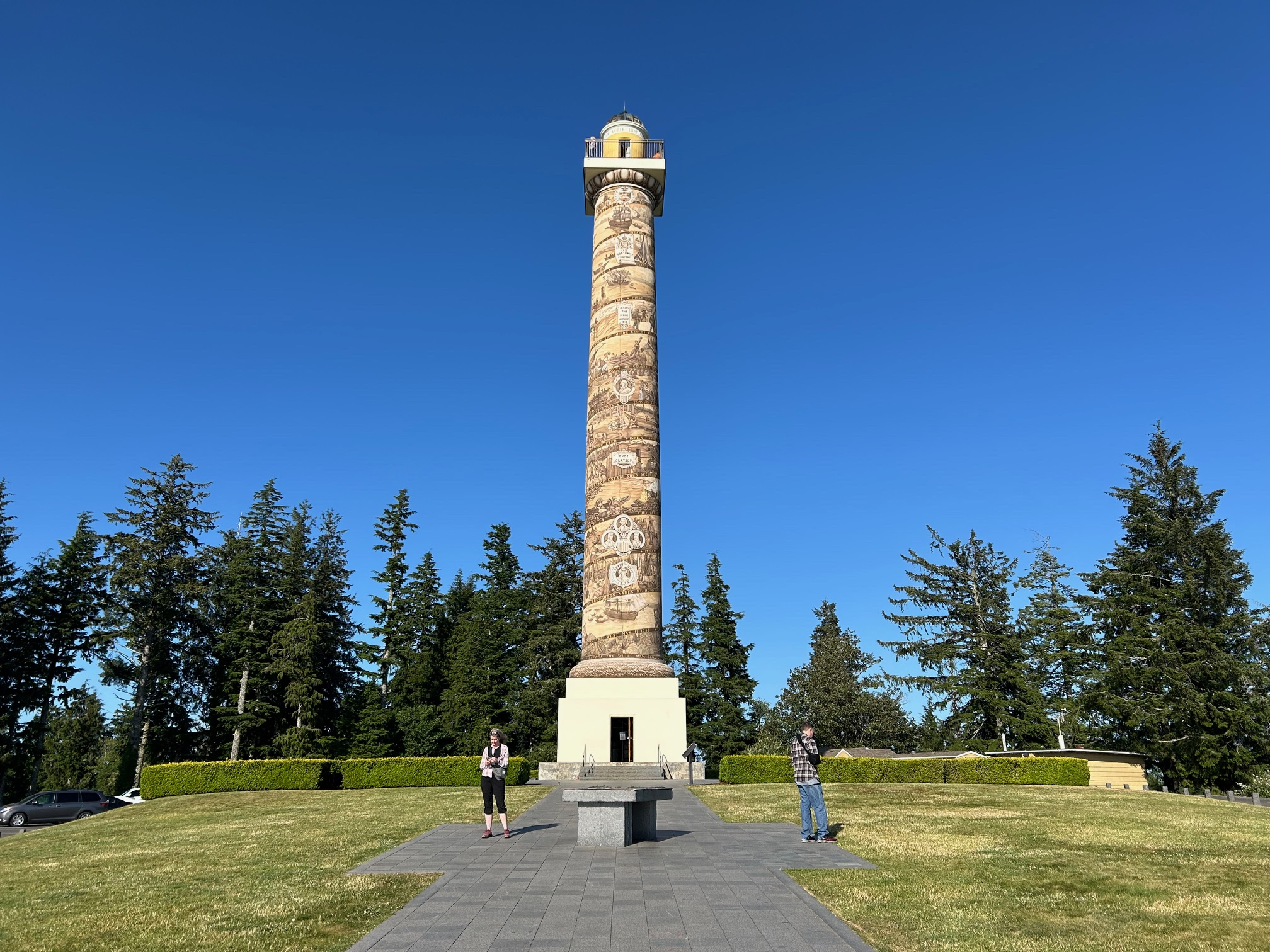
- The Astoria Column in 2024
- Location: Astoria, Oregon, U.S.
- Coordinates: 46°10′53″N 123°49′03″W
- Built: 1926, 100 years ago
- NRHP reference No.: 74001681
- Added to NRHP: May 2, 1974

The Astoria Column is a tower in the northwest United States, overlooking the mouth of the Columbia River on Coxcomb Hill in Astoria, Oregon. Built in 1926, the concrete and steel structure is part of a 30-acre (12 ha) city park called Astor Park.

The 125-foot (38 m)-tall column has a 164-step spiral staircase ascending to an exterior observation deck at the top.

== History ==
The tower was built in 1926 with financing by the Great Northern Railway and Vincent Astor, the great-grandson of John Jacob Astor, in commemoration of the city's role in the family's business history. Patterned after the Trajan Column in Rome (and Place Vendôme Column in Paris), the Astoria Column was dedicated on July 22, 1926. Maintenance work was done in 1936. In 1974, the column was listed in the National Register of Historic Places. The murals that make up the column were refurbished in 1995 and a granite plaza was added in 2004.

The column was one of a series of monuments erected by Great Northern between 1925 and 1926.

== Details ==
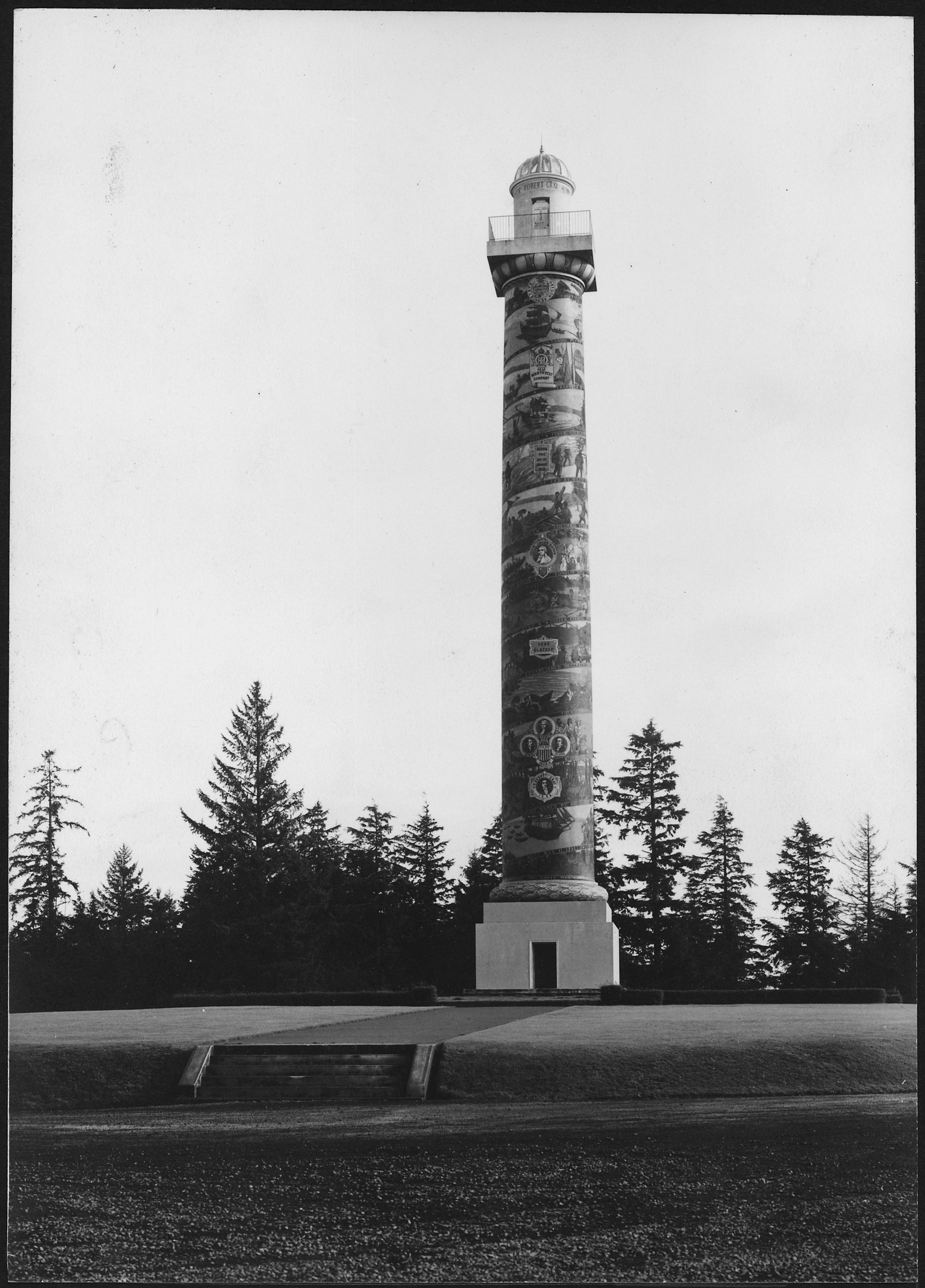
The column in 1938, as photographed by George A. Grant

The 125-foot-tall (38 m) column stands atop 600-foot (180 m) Coxcomb Hill and includes an interior spiral staircase that leads to an observation deck at the top. The spiral sgraffito frieze on the exterior of the structure has a width of nearly seven feet (2.1 m) and a length of 525 feet (160 m). Projected by Electus D. Litchfield and painted by Attilio Pusterla, the mural shows 14 significant events in the early history of Oregon, as well as 18 scenes from the history of the region, including Captain Gray's discovery of the Columbia River in 1792 and the Lewis and Clark Expedition. The frieze starts with the "pristine forest" and concludes with the arrival of the railway in Astoria.

Constructed of concrete, its foundation is twelve feet (3.7 m) deep. Built at a cost of $27,134 (equivalent to $493,461 in 2025), the tower has 164 steps to the top, where there is a replica of the State Seal of Oregon.

A plaque near the column commemorates the pioneering Community Antenna Television (CATV) system built by local resident Leroy E. "Ed" Parsons, initially at the Hotel Astoria, in which twin-lead transmission wires redistributed the signal of KRSC-TV (now KING-TV) in Seattle, Washington to area homes. Former Astoria resident Byron Roman was also involved in early cable invention and distribution.

The cast-iron spiral staircase inside the column was closed for safety reasons in November 2007. It was reopened to the public in time for the Regatta in August 2009.

== Gallery ==
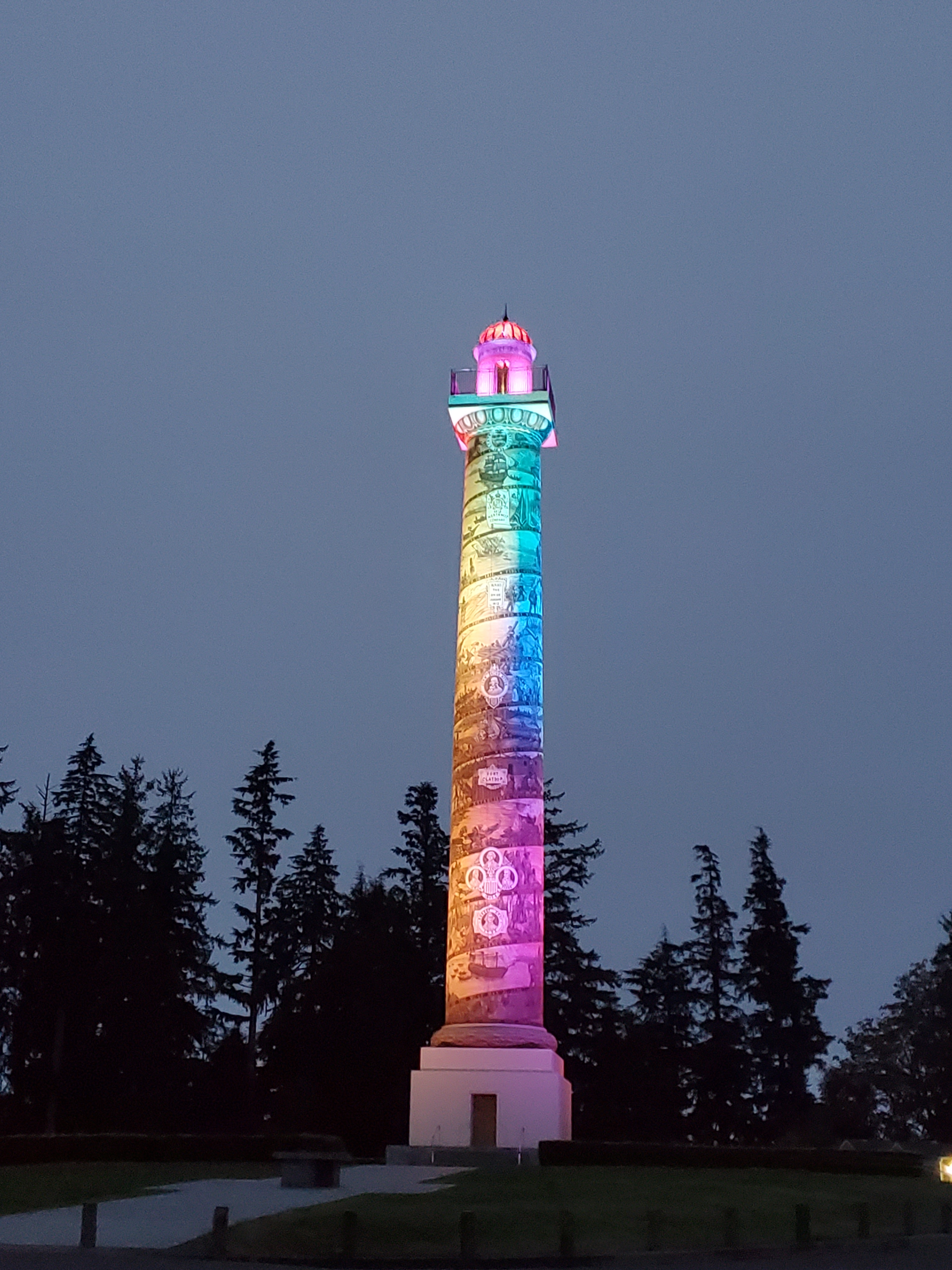
Astoria Column in a rainbow

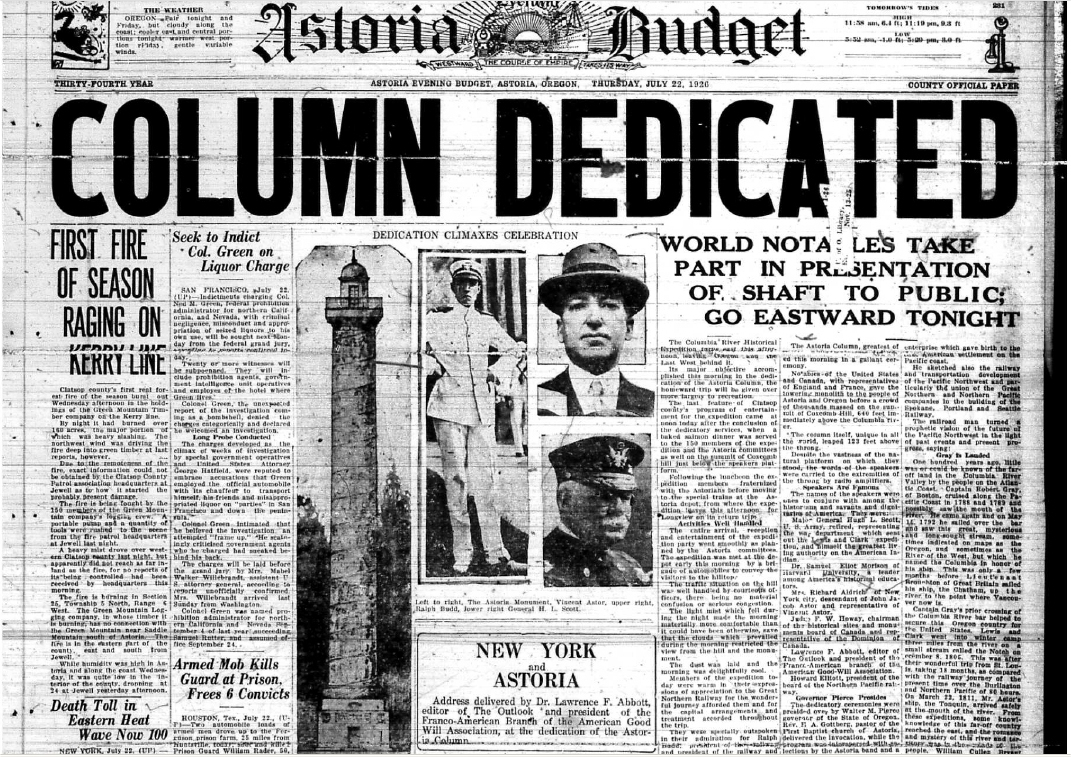
Newspaper on the day of dedication

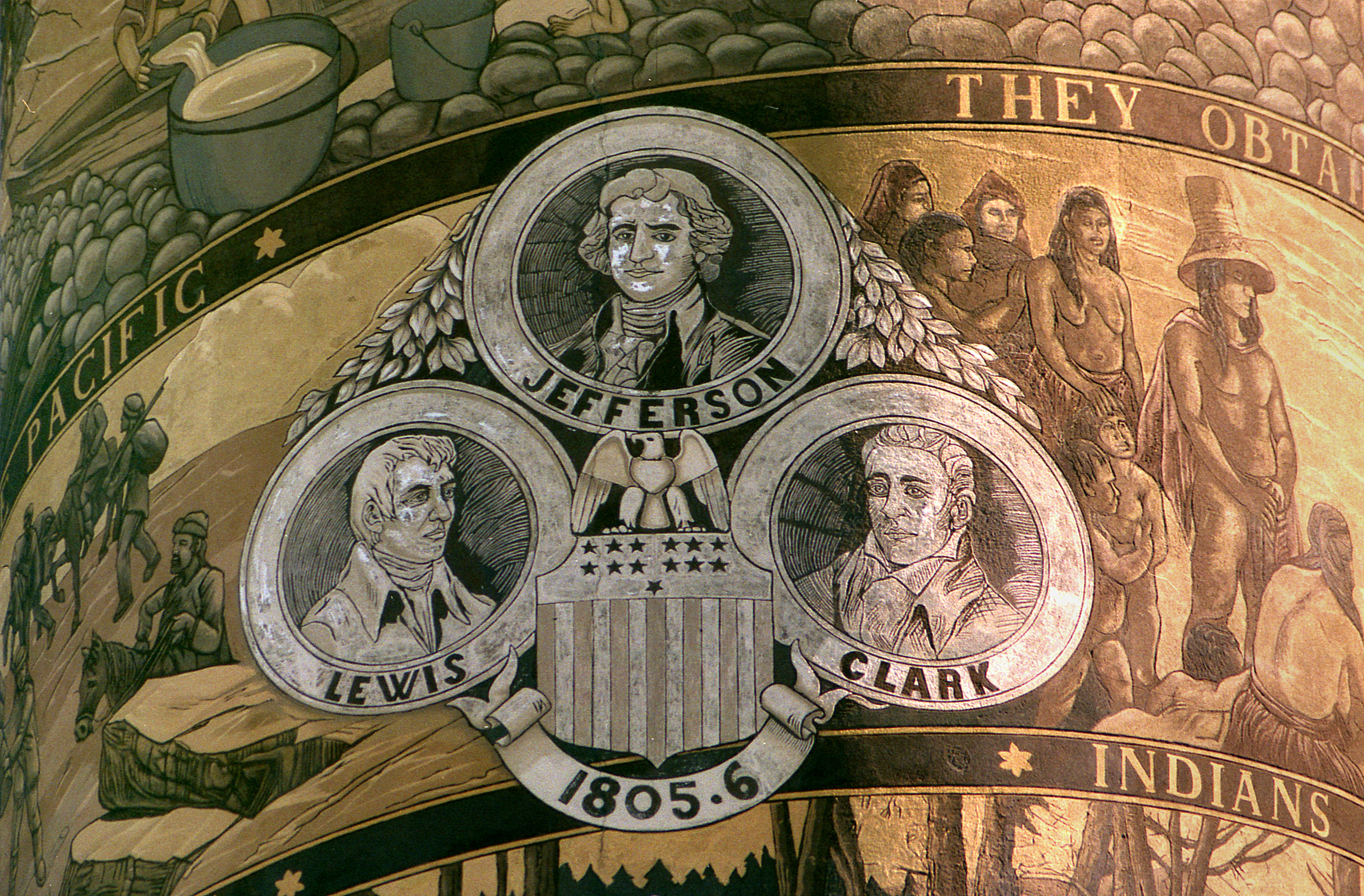
Detail of the column mural

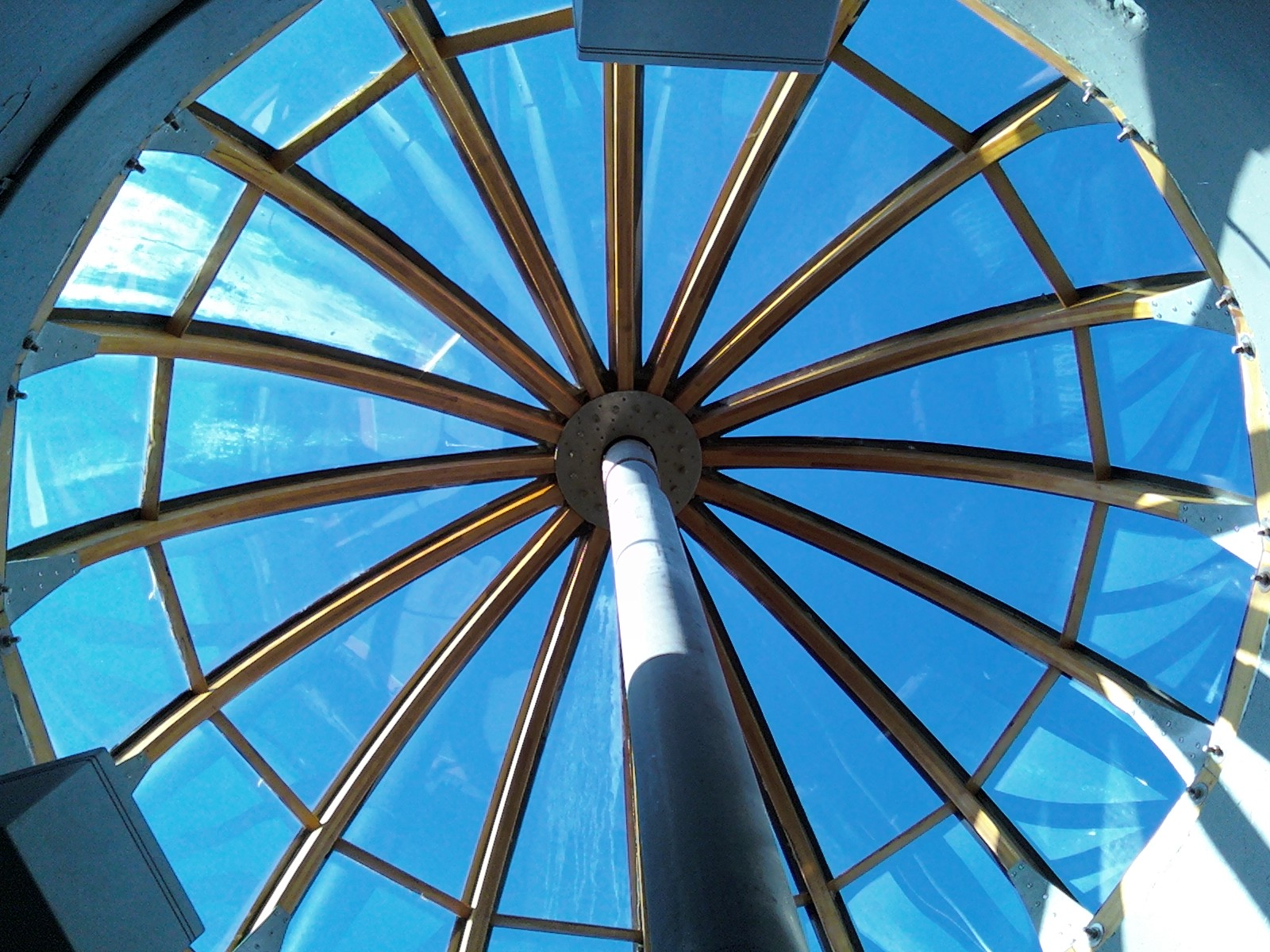
Roof

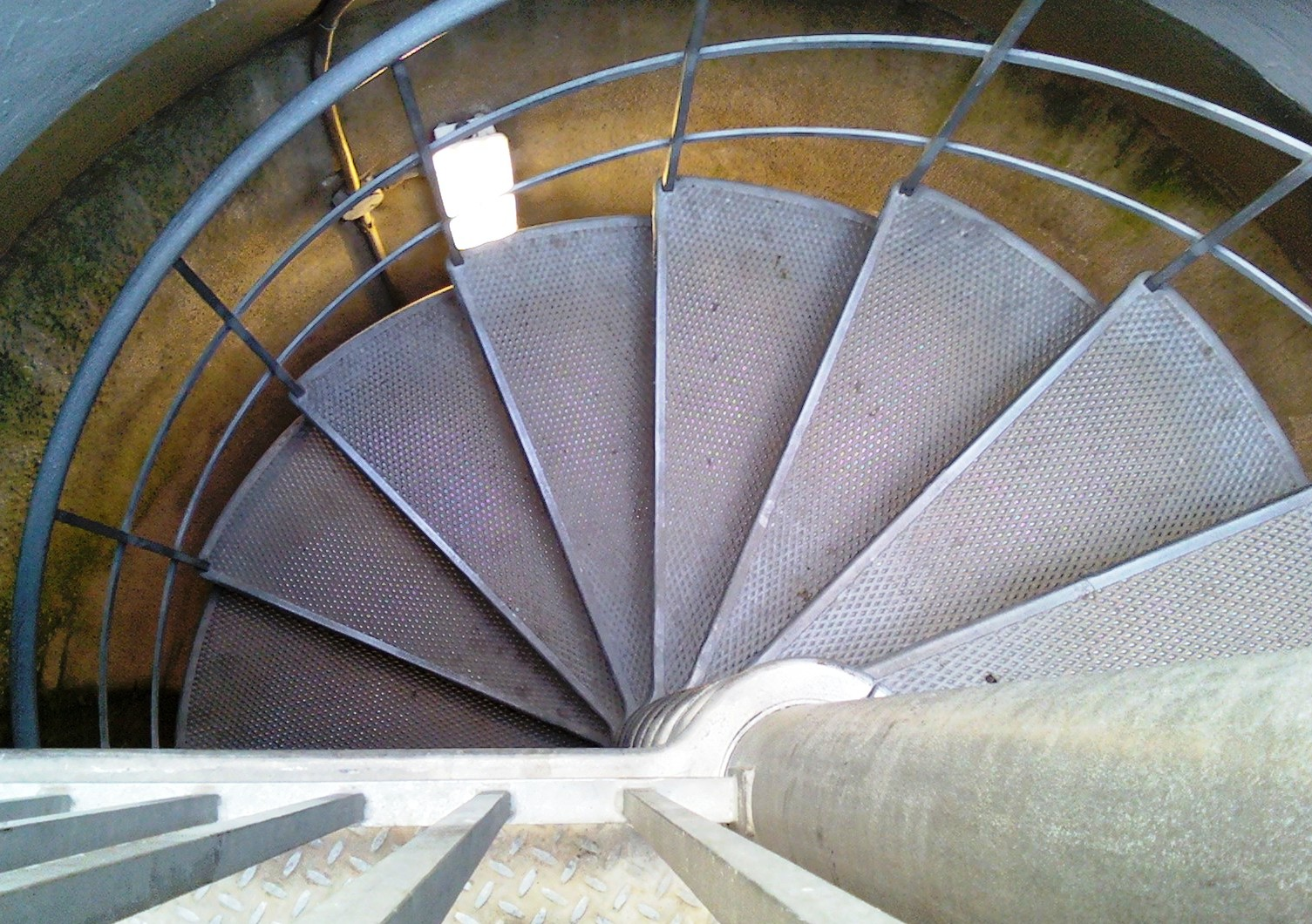
Spiral staircase (looking down)

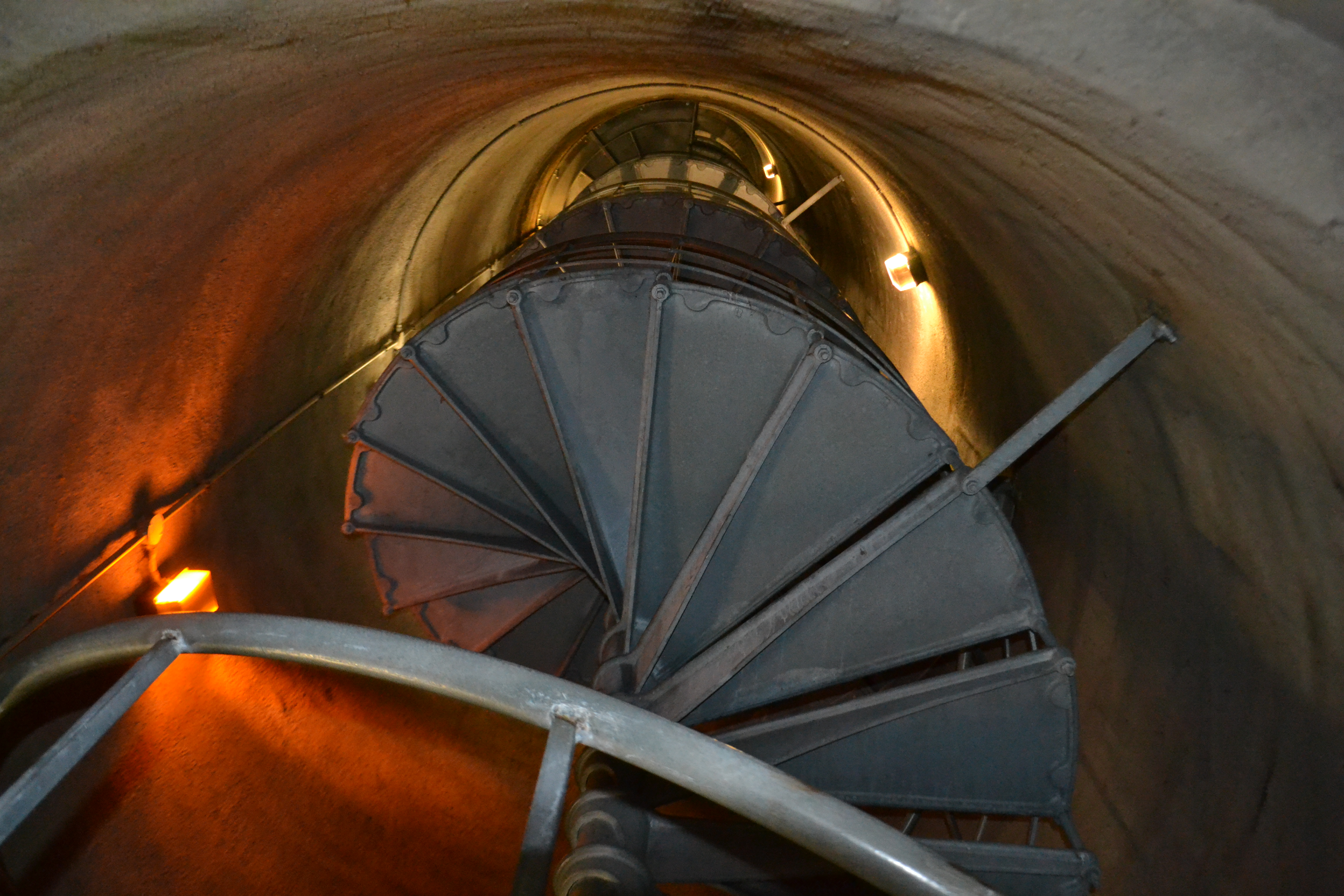
Spiral staircase (looking up)

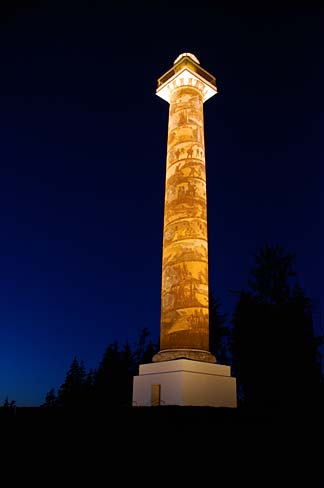
The column at night

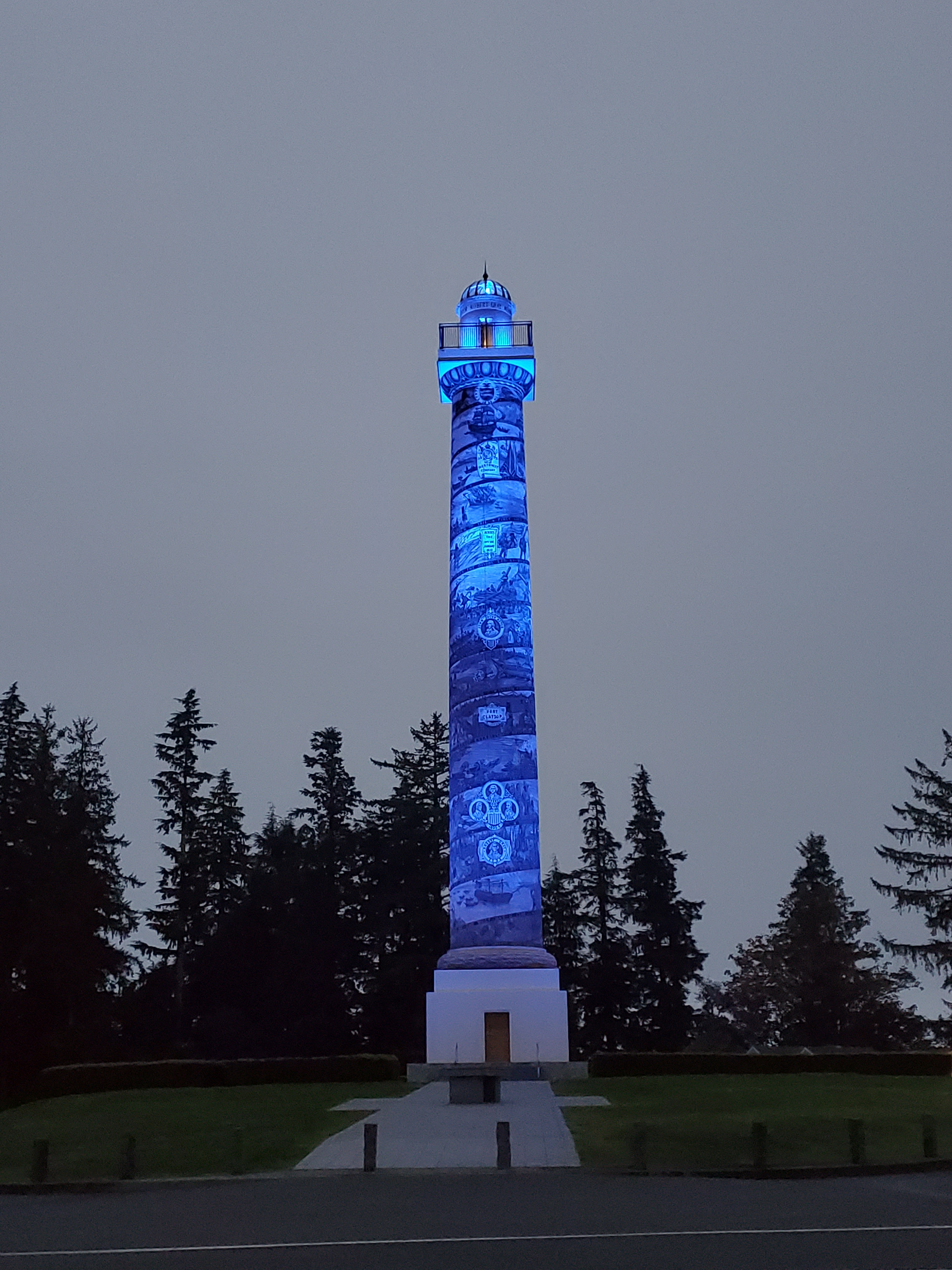
The column in blue lighting

== See also ==
=== Other Great Northern memorials ===
- Verendrye, North Dakota
- Camp Disappointment (Meriwether), Montana
- Marias Pass (Summit), Montana
- Bonners Ferry, Idaho
- Wishram, Washington
