= Skenandoa (YTB-835) =

Tugboat of the United States Navy

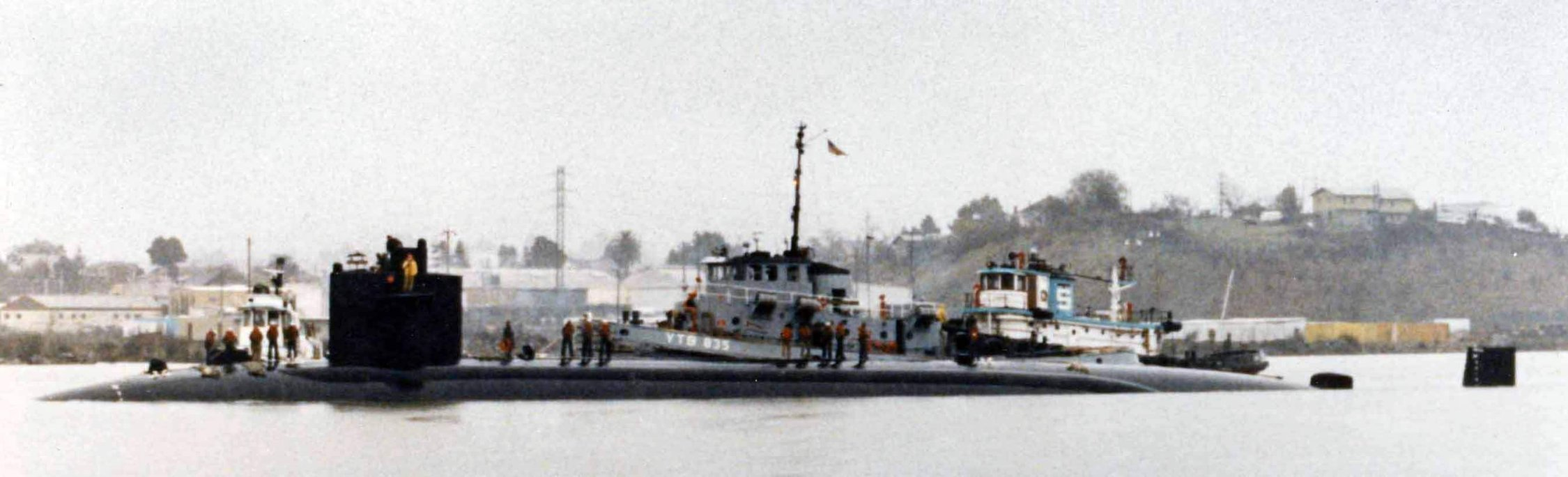
- Skenandoa (center rear) assists the submarine USS Pollack as Pollack arrives off Mare Island Naval Shipyard, Vallejo, California, in January 1988 for inactivation.

History

United States
- Namesake: Skenandoa (1710–1816)
- Awarded: 5 June 1973
- Builder: Marinette Marine Corporation, Marinette, Wisconsin
- Laid down: 9 September 1974
- Launched: 3 April 1975
- In service: 10 June 1975
- Stricken: 5 April 2023
- Identification: MMSI number: 369970411; Callsign: NMPC
- Honors and awards: National Defense Service Medal
- Status: Disposed of General Service Administration

General characteristics
- Class & type: Natick-class tugboat
- Displacement: 286 long tons (291 t) (light); 346 long tons (352 t) (full)
- Length: 108 ft (33 m)
- Beam: 29 ft (8.8 m)
- Draft: 14 ft (4.3 m)
- Installed power: 2000 horsepower (1.5 MW)
- Propulsion: 1 diesel engine, one shaft
- Speed: 12 knots (14 mph; 22 km/h)
- Complement: 12

Skenandoa (YTB-835) was a United States Navy Natick-class tugboat named for Oneida Chief Skenandoa. Skenandoa is the second US Navy ship to bear the name.

== Design ==
The contract for Skenandoa was awarded 5 June 1973. She was laid down on 9 September 1974 at Marinette, Wisconsin, by Marinette Marine and launched 3 April 1975. She is 108 feet long, 29 feet wide, and has a draft of 14 feet. She displaces 286 tonnes (281 long tons; 315 short tons) when empty, and 346 tonnes (341 long tons; 381 short tons) when full. She has a top speed of 12 knots (22 km/h; 14 mph), and a crew of 12 men. Her hull and superstructure are both made of steel. She is propelled by a diesel engine.

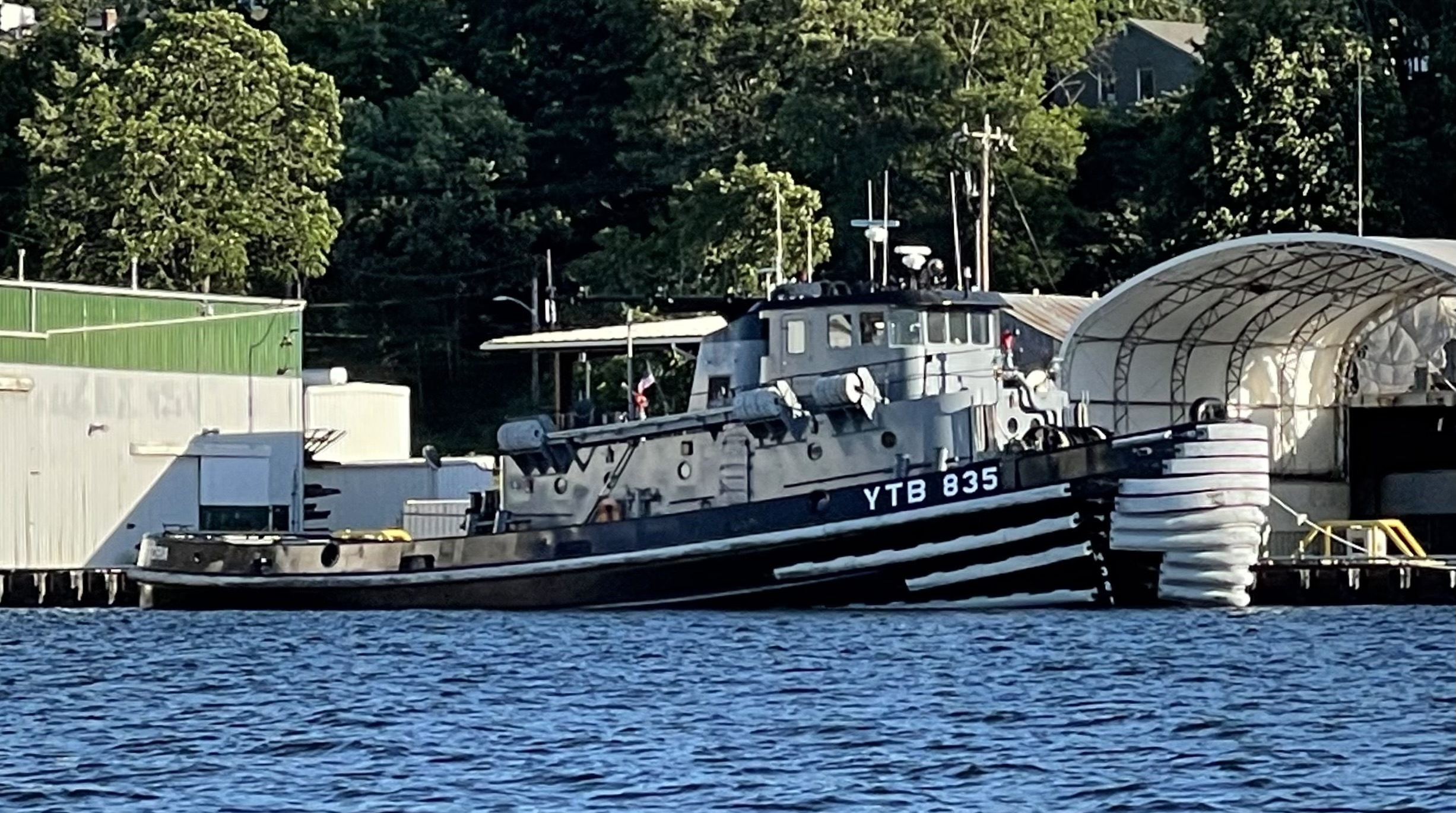
Skenandoa (YTB-835) moored in the Lake Washington Ship Canal, Seattle, Washington

== Operational history ==
Skenandoa initially was assigned to the 12th Naval District at San Francisco, California, aiding ships in berthing and docking maneuvers and providing waterfront fire protection. Sometime prior to October 2008, Skenandoa was transferred to Bremerton, Washington, where she served until April 2023 when she was stricken and disposed of by GSA. She has been given the National Defense Service Medal for her service. On 15 April 2023 Skenandoa was acquired by Pacific Defense Supply, and she currently operates out of Astoria, Oregon.
