= USS Pollack (SSN-603) =

Submarine of the United States

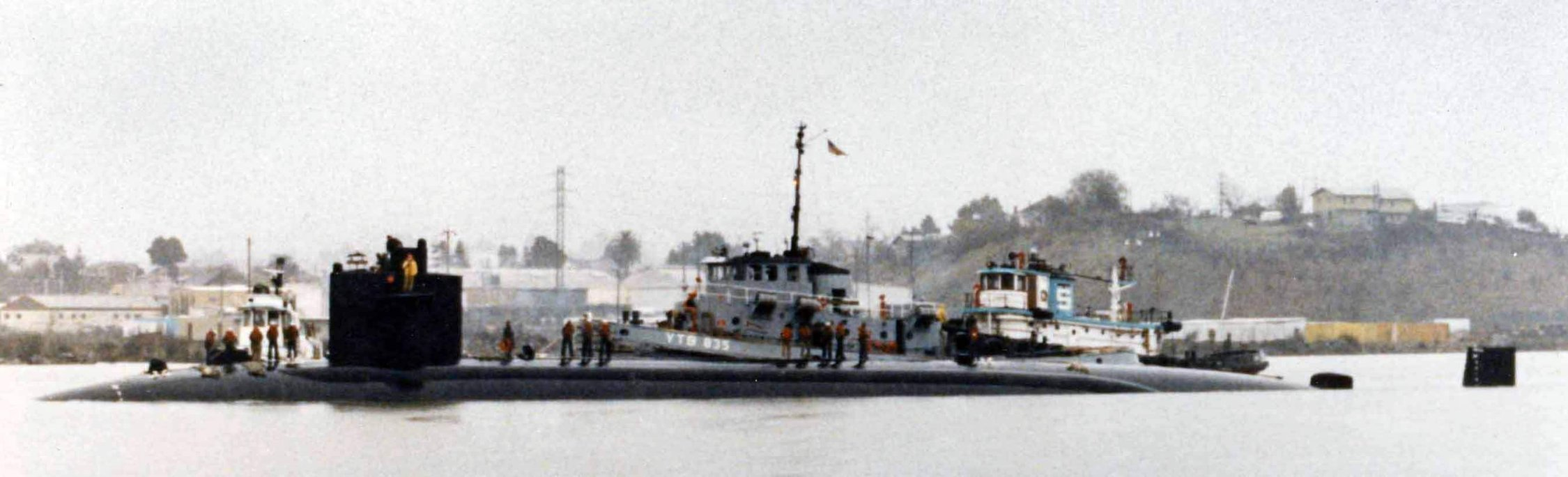
- USS Pollack (SSN-603) receives assistance from U.S. Navy tug USS Skenandoa (YTB-835) (center rear) while arriving off Mare Island Naval Shipyard, Vallejo, California, in January 1988 for inactivation.

History

United States
- Name: USS Pollack
- Namesake: The Pollack
- Awarded: 3 March 1959
- Builder: New York Shipbuilding, Camden, New Jersey
- Laid down: 14 March 1960
- Launched: 17 March 1962
- Sponsored by: Mrs. John Pastore
- Commissioned: 26 May 1964
- Decommissioned: 1 March 1989
- Stricken: 1 March 1989
- Fate: Entered Ship-Submarine Recycling Program, 9 February 1993

General characteristics
- Class & type: Thresher/Permit-class submarine
- Displacement: 3,750 long tons (3,810 t)
- Length: 278 ft 5 in (84.86 m)
- Beam: 31 ft 7 in (9.63 m)
- Draft: 25 ft 2 in (7.67 m)
- Propulsion: S5W PWR
- Speed: 20 knots (37 km/h; 23 mph)+
- Complement: 107 officers and men
- Armament: 4 × 21 in (533 mm) torpedo tubes; SUBROC

USS Pollack (SSN-603), a Permit-class attack submarine, was the second ship of the United States Navy to be named for the pollack, a food fish resembling the true cod, but with the lower jaw projecting and without the barbel.

The contract to build Pollack was awarded to New York Shipbuilding Corporation in Camden, New Jersey on 3 March 1959 and her keel was laid down on 14 March 1960. She was launched on 17 March 1962, sponsored by Mrs. John Pastore, and commissioned on 26 May 1964.

== Service history ==
Pollack reported to the Commander in Chief, U.S. Atlantic Fleet for duty, and became a unit of Submarine Squadron 4, homeported in Charleston, South Carolina. After shakedown in the Caribbean Sea, she underwent a six-month evaluation as an anti-submarine warfare (ASW) weapon.

Most of 1965 was spent at sea evaluating new ASW tactics, participating in a destroyer versus submarine evaluation, and practicing an anti-shipping mission. Also during 1965 Pollack earned the Navy Unit Commendation.

During 1966, Pollack was evaluated in coordinated ASW operations. She spent most of 1967 at sea, making various weapons tests. On 1 March 1968, Pollack's homeport was changed to Norfolk, Virginia, and she became a unit of Submarine Squadron 10, the first all-nuclear attack submarine squadron in the Navy. Pollack remained with the Atlantic Fleet into 1970.

History from 1970 to 1975 needed.

Following refueling overhaul at Charleston Naval Shipyard, Pollack was transferred to the Pacific Fleet and SubRon-3. She made a liberty call in Roosevelt Roads, Puerto Rico and transited the Panama Canal to reach her new home port of San Diego, California, on April 3, 1975.

In August and September 1975, Pollack participated in local operations in the Pearl Harbor area, and then returned to San Diego.

In 1977, Pollack earned the Battle Efficiency "E".

In January 1978, Pollack departed San Diego for a six-month deployment. She participated in a SEA SIAM exercise. Before returning to San Diego, she participated in a special operation.

In 1979 Pollack began a refit in Mare Island Naval Shipyard in Vallejo, California. She returned to Submarine Squadron 3, Submarine tender Sperry (AS-12), and San Diego, in 1982.

History from 1982 to 1986 needed.
In January 1987, USS Pollack was still stationed at port-of-call Point Loma, San Diego, SUB Squadron 3, performing weekly operations at sea and returning to port. In October 1987, she left port for a three-month cruise (NORPAC), but a month out to sea she ran into some equipment malfunctions that could not be handled at sea. So, she was brought back to port at Point Loma in November 1987. It was decided then that USS Pollack would transfer to Mare Island Shipyard and begin decommissioning a little earlier than originally planned.

In 1988, Pollack transferred to Submarine Group 5 at Mare Island Naval Shipyard. At the Mare Island Shipyard, the Pollack's crew (now designated as the decommissioning crew) worked on removing and documenting all reusable equipment prior to defueling the reactor. After removing the spent fuel from the reactor, more work was done removing salvageable equipment that couldn't be removed while the reactor still had its fuel installed. By March 1st of 1989, fuel and salvageable parts were removed and the Pollack was moved to Puget Sound, awaiting its entry into the SSRP (Ship and Submarine Recycling Program).

Pollack was decommissioned and stricken from the Naval Vessel Register on 1 March 1989 . Ex-Pollack entered the Nuclear Powered Ship and Submarine Recycling Program in Bremerton, Washington, on 9 February 1993. Recycling was completed on 17 February 1995.

== See also ==
- SUBSAFE Submarine Quality Assurance Program
