= New York Shipbuilding Corporation =

US shipbuilding company

Coordinates: 39°54′39″N 75°7′20″W

- Company type: Public
- Industry: Shipbuilding
- Founded: 1899
- Defunct: 1968
- Fate: Ceased operations in 1968
- Successor: South Jersey Port Corporation (now Broadway Terminal)
- Headquarters: Camden, New Jersey, U.S.

The New York Shipbuilding Corporation (or New York Ship for short) was an American shipbuilding company that operated from 1899 to 1968, ultimately completing more than 500 vessels for the U.S. Navy, the United States Merchant Marine, the United States Coast Guard, and other maritime concerns. At its peak during World War II, NYSB was the largest and most productive shipyard in the world. Its best-known vessels include the destroyer USS Reuben James (DD-245), the cruiser USS Indianapolis (CA-35), the aircraft carrier USS Kitty Hawk (CV-63), the nuclear-powered cargo ship NS Savannah, and a quartet of cargo-passenger liners nicknamed the 4 Aces.

== History ==
It was founded in 1899 by Henry G. Morse (1850–2 June 1903), (Note: Not to be confused with architect Henry Grant Morse, Jr. (1884 – May 28, 1934).) an engineer noted in connection with bridge design and construction and senior partner of Morse Bridge Company. The original plan was to build a shipyard on Staten Island, thus the name of the company, but plans to acquire a site there failed. The company then explored other potential sites as far south as Virginia, particularly in the Delaware River area, and ultimately chose a location in the southern part of Camden, New Jersey. Site selection considered the needs of the planned application of bridge-building practices of prefabrication and assembly-line production of ships in covered ways. Construction of the plant began in July 1899; the keel of the first ship was laid in November 1900. That ship, contract number 1, was M. S. Dollar, which was later modified as an oil tanker and renamed J. M. Guffey. (Note: U.S. Navy as USS J. M. Guffey (ID-1279) commissioned 14 October 1918 at Invergorden, Scotland, decommissioned Philadelphia 17 June 1919 (DANFS).) Two of the first contracts were for passenger ships that were among the largest then being built in the United States: #5 for Mongolia and #6 for Manchuria. Morse died after securing contracts for 20 ships. He was followed as president by De Coursey May.

On November 27, 1916, a special meeting of the company's stockholders ratified sale of the "fifteen million dollar plant" to a group of companies composed of American International Corporation, International Mercantile Marine Co., W. R. Grace and Company and the Pacific Mail Steamship Company. (Note: On page 510 of the reference notes that American International Corporation holds interests in the International Mercantile Marine Company, Pacific Mail Steamship, Grace Lines and other ocean transportation companies. The same journal in the October issue, page 440, states American International Corporation had "control of the Pacific Mail Steamship Company.") From about 1933 to 1937 the shipyard was part of Errett Lobban Cord's business empire.

New York Ship's unusual covered ways produced everything from aircraft carriers, battleships, and luxury liners to barges and car floats.

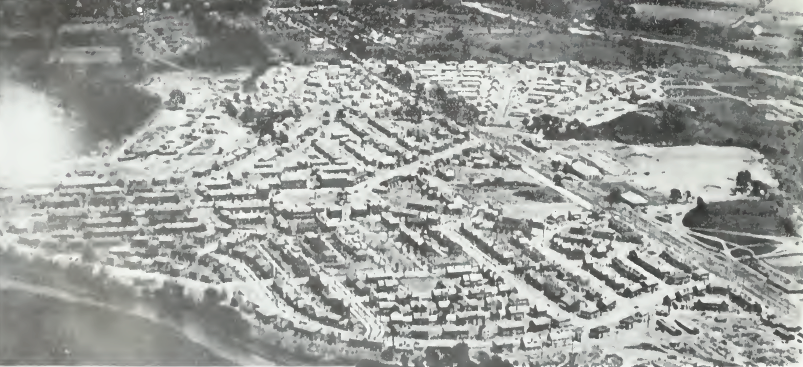
Air view of Yorkship Village

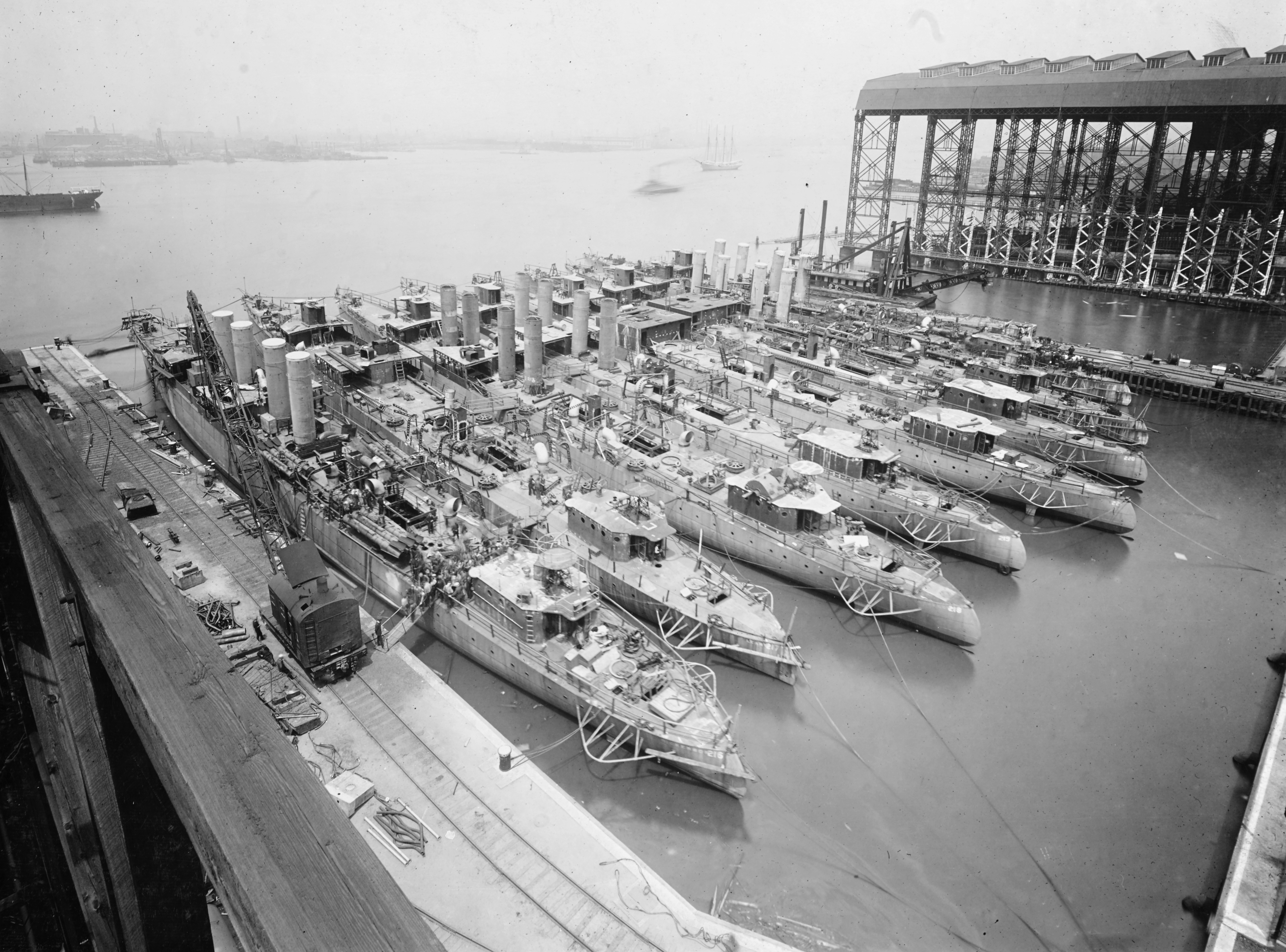
Eight destroyers of the Wickes class, New York Shipbuilding Corporation, Camden, New Jersey, 1919

During World War I, New York Ship expanded rapidly to fill orders from the U.S. Navy and the Emergency Fleet Corporation. A critical shortage of worker housing led to the construction of Yorkship Village, a planned community of 1,000 brick homes designed by Electus Darwin Litchfield and financed by the War Department. Yorkship Village is now the Fairview section of the City of Camden.

New York Ship's World War II production included all nine Independence-class light carriers (CVL), built on Cleveland-class light cruiser hulls; the 40,000-ton battleship USS South Dakota (BB-57); all three of the six 30,000-ton Alaska-class cruisers that were built (Alaska, Guam, and Hawaii), four 15,000-ton Baltimore-class heavy cruisers, and 98 LCTs (Landing Craft, Tank), many of which took part in the D-Day landings at Normandy.

After World War II, a much-diminished New York Ship subsisted on a trickle of contracts from the United States Maritime Administration and the U.S. Navy. In 1959, the yard launched the NS Savannah, the world's first nuclear-powered merchant ship. The yard launched its last civilian vessel (SS Export Adventurer) in 1960, and its last naval vessel, USS Camden, was ordered in 1967. The company's final completed submarine was USS Guardfish (SSN-612), which had been ordered in the early 1960s, but construction was halted from 1963 to 1965 because of the loss of the USS Thresher. Guardfish was commissioned in December 1967.

In 1968, lacking new naval orders, NYS ceased operations. USS Pogy (SSN-647), then under construction, was towed to Ingalls Shipbuilding in Pascagoula, Mississippi, for completion.

The yard's site is now part of the Port of Camden. The caisson previously used in NYS's graving dock is still in use today in the former Philadelphia Navy Yard's dry dock number 3.

== World War II Slipways ==
Slipway	Width	Length	Date	Notes
J	110 feet (34 m)	840 feet (260 m)	1900-41	Length originally 600 ft, lengthened to 840 ft for construction of Alaska-class cruisers
K	110 feet (34 m)	840 feet (260 m)	1900-41	Length originally 600 ft, lengthened to 840 ft for construction of Alaska-class cruisers
L	110 feet (34 m)	840 feet (260 m)	1900-41	Length originally 600 ft, lengthened to 840 ft for construction of Alaska-class cruisers
M	110 feet (34 m)	840 feet (260 m)	1912-41	Length originally 700 ft, lengthened to 840 ft for construction of Alaska-class cruisers
O	112 feet (34 m)	900 feet (270 m)	1915	
T	130 feet (40 m) (Note: Based upon measurements made with Google Earth of slipway remains.)	650 feet (200 m)	1941	
U1	180 feet (55 m)	650 feet (200 m)	1941	Could be extended up to 1,000 ft
U2	180 feet (55 m)	650 feet (200 m)	1941	Could be extended up to 1,000 ft
U3	200 feet (61 m)	650 feet (200 m)	1941	Could be extended up to 1,000 ft
U4	200 feet (61 m)	650 feet (200 m)	1941	Could be extended up to 1,000 ft

== Ships built ==
Ships built by New York Ship include:

- Aircraft carriers
  - 1 of 2 Lexington-class aircraft carrier
    - USS Saratoga (CV-3), launched 7 April 1925
  - 9 of 9 Independence-class light carriers
    - Independence (CVL-22)
    - Princeton, Belleau Wood, Cowpens, Monterey, Langley, Cabot, Bataan
    - San Jacinto (CVL-30)
  - 2 of 2 Saipan-class light carriers
    - Saipan (CVL-48), Wright (CVL-49)
  - 1 of 4 Kitty Hawk-class aircraft carrier
    - USS Kitty Hawk (CV-63), launched 21 May 1960
- Battleships
  - 1 of 3 New Mexico-class
    - USS Idaho (BB-42)
  - 1 of 3 Colorado-class
    - USS Colorado (BB-45)
  - 1 of 2 Nevada-class
    - USS Oklahoma (BB-37)
  - 1 of 4 South Dakota-class
    - USS South Dakota (BB-57)
- Colliers
  - SS Plymouth served as USS Plymouth from 1918 to 1919, as an auxiliary cargo ship, then returned to civilian service as SS Plymouth
  - SS Fairmont served as USS Fairmont from 1918 to 1919, as an auxiliary cargo ship, then returned to civilian service again as the SS Fairmont. In 1922 she was renamed Nebraskan. For World War II she was renamed SS Black Point and was the last ship sunk by a U-boat on May 5, 1945.
  - SS Winding Gulf
  - SS Tidewater did not serve in the US Navy. Renamed SS Isaac T. Mann in 1923 and was scrapped at Baltimore in 1954.
  - SS Glen White served as USS Glen White from 1918 to 1919 then returned to civilian service as SS Glen White.
  - SS Sewalls Point did not serve in the US Navy.
  - SS Franklin did not serve in the US Navy, became SS Nevadan in 1921, then SS Oakey L. Alexander in 1926. Was wrecked on the Maine coast on 3 March 1947.
  - SS William N. Page
- Cruisers
  - 1 of 2 Portland-class heavy cruisers
    - Indianapolis (CA-35) launched 7 November 1931
  - 3 of 9 Brooklyn-class light cruisers
    - USS Savannah (CL-42) launched 8 May 1937
    - USS Nashville (CL-43) 2 October 1937
    - USS Phoenix (CL-46) 19 March 1938
  - 4 of 14 Baltimore-class heavy cruisers
    - Bremerton (CA-130) launched 2 July 1944
    - Fall River (CA-131) 13 August 1944
    - Macon (CA-132) 15 October 1944
    - Toledo (CA-133) 6 May 1945
  - 3 of 3 Alaska-class large cruiser
    - Alaska (CB-1), Guam (CB-2), Hawaii (CB-3)
  - 8 of 27 Cleveland-class light cruisers
  - 1 of 1 Truxtun-class nuclear-powered guided missile cruisers
    - Truxtun (CGN-35) launched 23 June 1962
- 4 of 8 Porter-class destroyers
- Fast combat support ship
  - Sacramento-class fast combat support ship
    - USS Camden (AOE-2)
- Oil tankers
  - SS Gulfoil
  - Gulflight launched 1914. Center of a diplomatic incident when torpedoed in World War I.
  - SS Sylvan Arrow, launched 1918
  - SS Camden (1921) sunk by Japanese submarine I-25 in 1942
  - SS Dixie Arrow
  - Japanese seaplane tender Kamoi launched 1922
  - SS Empire Arrow
- Submarine
  - Thresher/Permit-class fast attack submarine (nuclear)
    - USS Pollack (SSN-603)
    - USS Haddo (SSN-604)
    - USS Guardfish (SSN-612)
  - Sturgeon-class fast attack submarine (nuclear)
    - USS Pogy (SSN-647) (completed at Ingalls Shipbuilding)
  - Barbel-class fast attack submarine (diesel):
    - USS Bonefish (SS-582)
- Nuclear-powered merchant ship
  - NS Savannah
- Passenger/cargo ship
  - SS Panhandle State: Also named: President Monroe, President Buchanan, (Iris), and Emily H. M. Weder.
  - SS Munargo: Also named Arthur Murray (Army but never used), USS Munargo (Navy), USAT Thistle, USAHS Thistle (Army hospital).
- Other ships and boats
    - Washington Irving—the biggest passenger-carrying riverboat (paddle steamer) ever built.

== Athletic ==
An athletic team for the 16,000 employees was created in the 1910s.

== See also ==
- New York Shipbuilding strike

== Bibliography ==
- "History and development of New York Shipbuilding Corporation". Bulletin of American International Corporation. Vol. III, no. 1. June 1920.
- "Death of Henry G. Morse, President New York Shipbuilding Company". Marine Engineering. Vol. 8, no. 7. New York. July 1903. p. 376.
- "Shipbuilding and General Marine News". Marine Engineering. Vol. 21, no. 12. December 1916. pp. 510, 557.
