= Attilio Pusterla =

Italian painter (1862–1941)

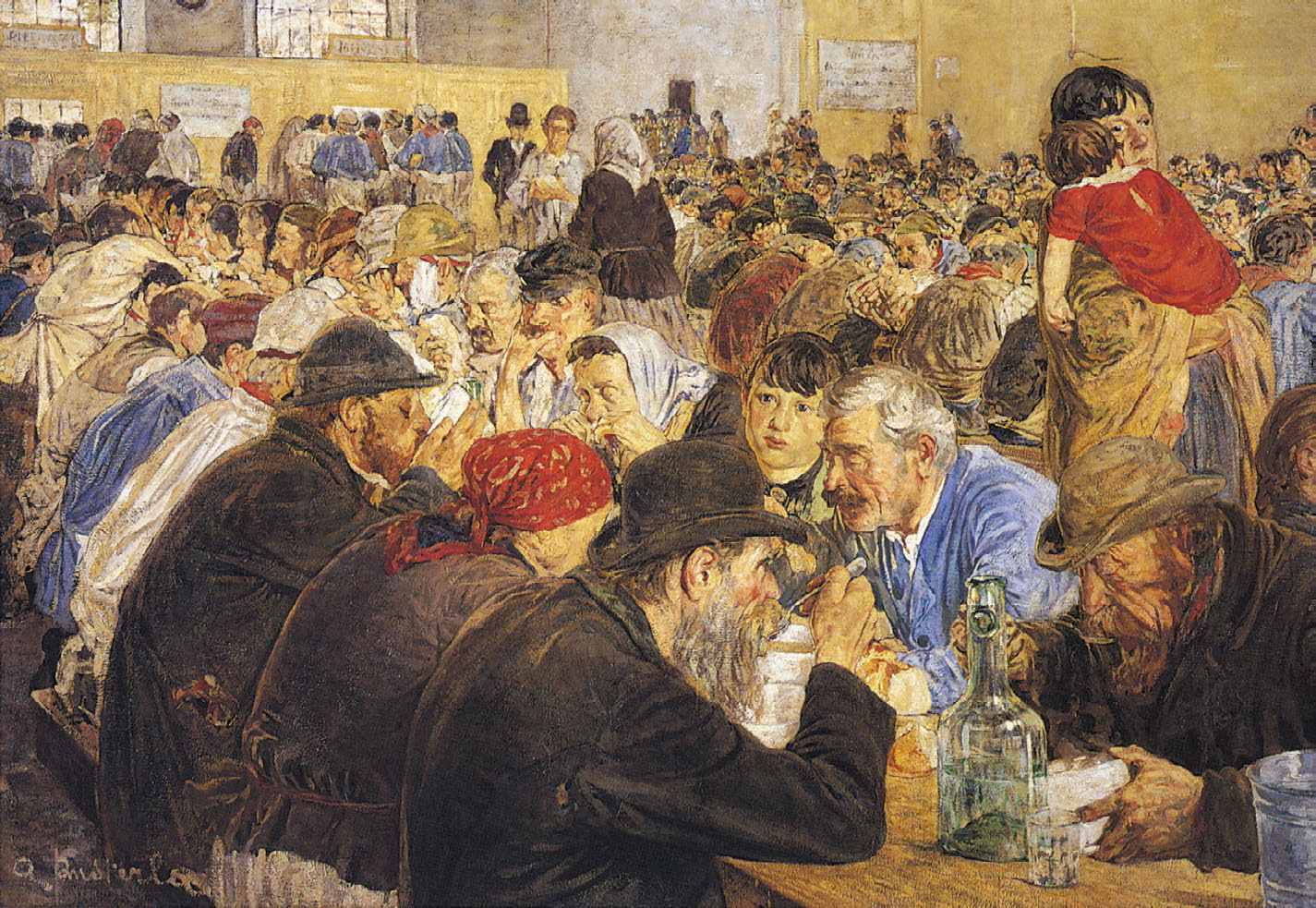
Alle cucine economiche di Porta nuova (1886-7). Galleria d'Arte Moderna, Milan

Attilio Pusterla (Milan, Italy, 1862 – Woodcliff, New Jersey, United States, 1941) was an Italian painter. By 1880, he attended the Brera Academy alongside Filippo Carcano, Emilio Longoni and Angelo Morbelli. He allied himself to the style and subjects of Vittore Grubicy and resided in Milan.

In 1883, in Milan and Rome, Pusterla exhibited Effetto di sole. Also in Rome, he displayed another canvas depicting Motterone sul Lago Maggiore. At the 1886 Promotrice (and in 1887 in Venice) he sent Vecchio pescatore, La questua dei poreri and Dopo una predica. At 1886 in Milan, he sent Portrait of his father and Portrait of painter Gustavo Macchi. He then began genre painting figures of contemporary working class life, including Cucine Economiche, An English Marriage in a Cemetery and the Bevitrici di Sangue.

Pusterla's social content did not gain him economic success, so by 1900 he had moved to the United States. Among his works in North America were some of the frescoes on the Astoria Column in Oregon, as well as frescoes in the House of Commons of Canada. As part of Works Progress Administration-sponsored projects employing artists, he directed many of the frescoes for the New York County Supreme Courthouse on Foley Square.
