= Fairview, Camden =

Populated place in Camden County, New Jersey, US

Fairview Village
- Neighborhood of Camden
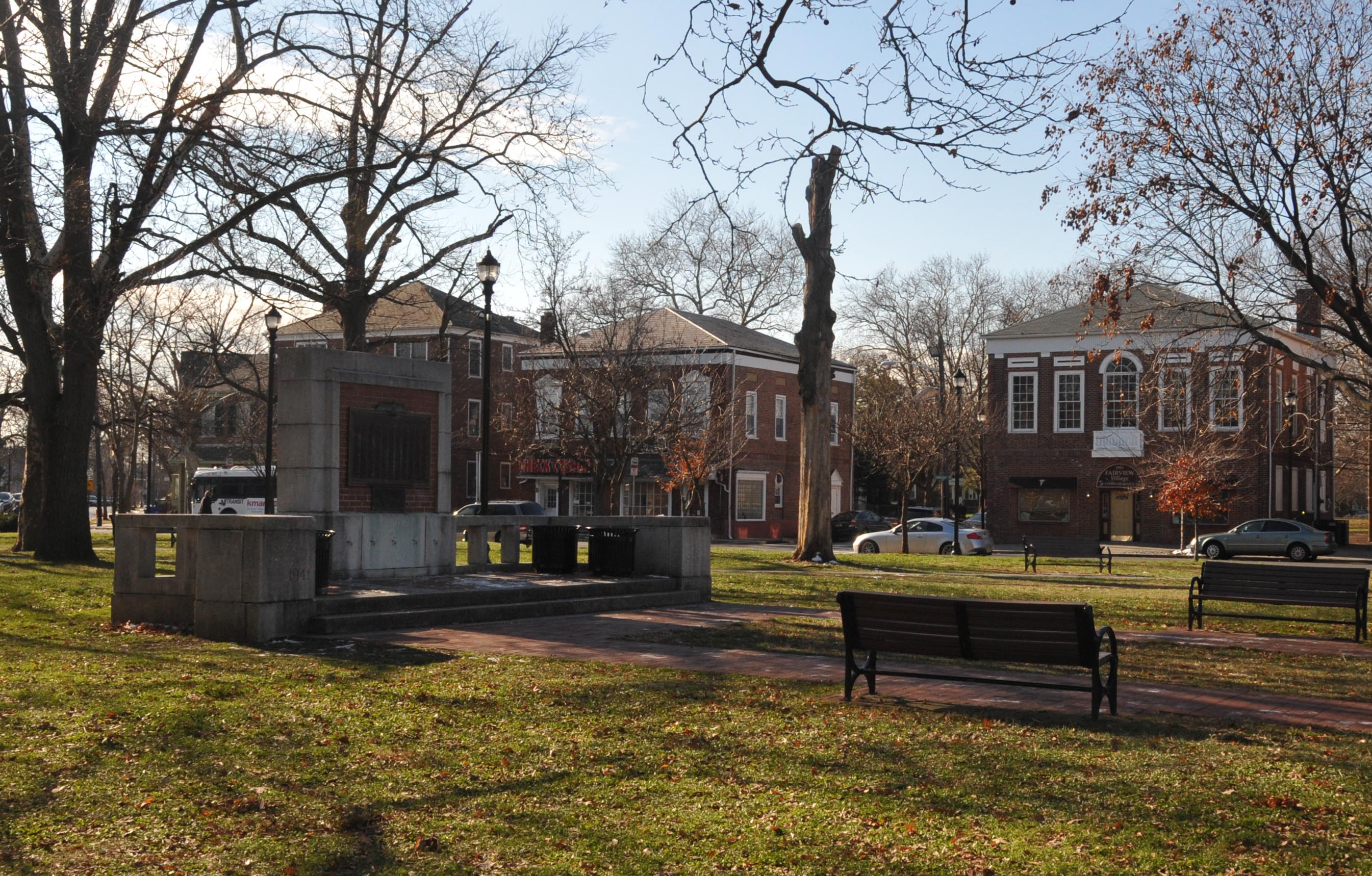
- A memorial in Yorkship Square, surrounded by residential buildings.
- Nickname: Yorkship Village
- Location in Camden County Location in New Jersey Location in the United States
- Coordinates: 39°54′22″N 75°6′21″W
- Country: United States
- State: New Jersey
- County: Camden
- City: Camden
- Elevation: 20 ft (6 m)
- Time zone: UTC−05:00 (Eastern (EST))
  - Summer (DST): UTC−04:00 (EDT)
- ZIP Code: 08104
- Area code: 856
- GNIS feature ID: 0881986

- Fairview Historic District
- U.S. National Register of Historic Places
- U.S. Historic district
- New Jersey Register of Historic Places
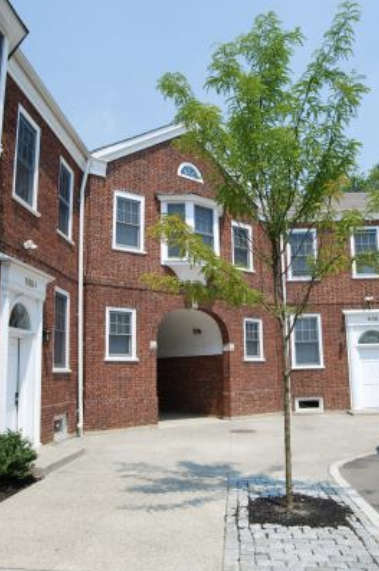
- Location: Hull Rd and Olympia Rd.; Mount Ephraim Ave.; Crescent Boulevard; North-South Freeway; Camden, New Jersey
- Coordinates: 39°54′22″N 75°6′21″W
- Area: 225 acres (0.91 km^{2})
- Built: 1918
- Architect: Electus Darwin Litchfield
- NRHP reference No.: 74001157
- NJRHP No.: 910

Significant dates
- Added to NRHP: November 1, 1974
- Designated NJRHP: July 1, 1974

Fairview, originally named Yorkship Village, is a neighborhood located in southern Camden, in Camden County, in the U.S. state of New Jersey. According to the 2000 United States census, Fairview Village has a population of 5,947. Much of the neighborhood is part of a historic district listed on the state and federal registers of historic places.

== History ==
The neighborhood was a federally funded World War I planned community of approximately 1000 homes located near New York Shipbuilding of Camden, New Jersey, and was intended to provide housing for the shipyard's workers and their families. New York Shipbuilding had more than tripled in size due to war contracts, and the influx of shipyard workers was overwhelming the Camden housing market. The United States Shipping Board through its Emergency Fleet Corporation used funds from a $50,000,000 appropriation for housing to alleviate a housing shortage threatening its shipbuilding program. Actual construction was managed by the Department of Housing and Transit, United States Shipping Board, Emergency Fleet Corporation which selected Electus Darwin Litchfield as architect.

The site chosen was just upstream from the shipyard on the South Branch of Newton Creek. The 225-acre (0.91 km^{2}) parcel, then located in Haddon Township, had formerly been the Old Cooper Farmstead. The village's design was influenced by the garden city movement developing in England at the time.

Litchfield envisioned Yorkship Village as "a place of light rooms and clean yards, with adequate playgrounds and amusement fields; a place of beauty and appropriateness and cleanliness so great that a man returning from his daily toil would receive new strength and recreation; a place where the man who could save a fraction of his income would be able to obtain with it, for himself and for his children, a share of play and education, literature and music, and other uplifting things."

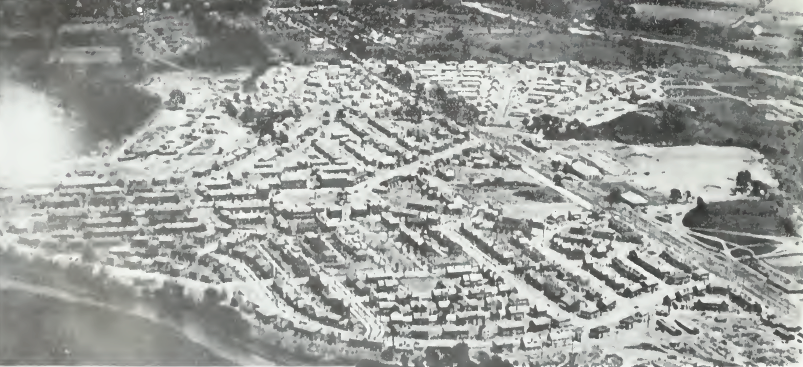
Air view of Yorkship Village.

Litchfield's plan for Yorkship Village included narrow, winding residential streets (soon to be tree-lined), a central village square, broad green boulevards, and brick duplexes and row homes with both front and back yards. Architecturally, the village is now considered an example of American Federal style. The "village" character would be further emphasized by physical isolation, since it was bordered on three sides by Newton Creek.

Construction began with ground-breaking on May 1, 1918. The United States Shipping Board, Emergency Fleet Corporation bore the estimated $11 million cost of construction, but required the local community to provide utilities, fire hydrants, and fire and police protection. The cost of those services was beyond the means of Haddon Township, which ceded Yorkship Village to the City of Camden on July 8, 1918.

At the end of the war the Emergency Fleet Corporation began selling properties with 1,579 houses, 59 apartments, 13 stores, a hotel, a gymnasium and miscellaneous buildings unsold at the start of 1921. By the end of Fiscal Year 1924 all but twelve houses, the sewage system and plant, water system, bridge, public squares and parks had been sold.

It became Camden's 14th Ward. Though Yorkship Village was renamed Fairview in 1922, the original elementary school located near the square is still operating as Yorkship School, and all of the original streets are still named for famous naval vessels.

== See also ==
- National Register of Historic Places listings in Camden County, New Jersey
