= SLOT buoy =

A SLOT buoy (short for: "Submarine-Launched One-Way Transmitter Buoy" or "Submarine-Launched One-Way Tactical Buoy") is a buoy with an on-board radio transmitter for sending a message from a submerged submarine to the overwater world.

== Purpose ==
The basic purpose of the SLOT buoy is to establish a line of communication from a single, submerged, usually military submarine to their superordinate, onshore military or civilian command structure or fellow overwater units. Due to the design of the buoy, communication through this kind of buoy can only run from the submarine to the overwater world and not the other way around.

== Design ==
The SLOT buoy is about the size of a baseball and can be launched out of a 3" or 4" starter. For further design details the data of the "SLOT 281" buoy from the "ALSEAMAR" company are given as an example:

characteristics	value
designation	SLOT 281
max. underwater depth at start	150 m
max. speed of submarine at start	15 kn (28 km/h)
ERP	1 W FM
channel	999 UHF-channels, in 25 kHz spacing
length of message	up to 120 s voice message
time delay (of message)	0 minutes – 99 hours
cycle duration and number of cycles	adjustable
final action	self-scuttling at the end of transmission time
shelf life	up to 5 years

E.g. the price of the SLOT buoy AN/BRT-1 of the company Sippican Ocean Systems (since 2004 part of Lockheed Martin Maritime Systems and Sensors) were 1982 at 572 USD per unit, which equals ca. 1500 USD in 2018. Another supplier of SLOT buoys was Motorola.

== Use Cases ==
=== Military ===
One of the tactical main goals during the deployment of a military submarine is to operate undetected as to evade destruction of the submarine by hostile forces and be able to finish missions successfully. Therefore the position of the submarine has to remain concealed from the enemy and to achieve this e.g. the surfacing of the submarine, especially with the enemy nearby, has to be avoided whenever possible, because in this case detection by visual, ASW ships, ASW aircraft and reconnaissance satellites is likely. Were the submarine in addition to emit radio waves, a triangulation of the position of the submarine by hostile forces would be easy and even more likely. On the other hand, to react appropriately to changes of the overall situation on the maritime battlefield it is very useful, if not necessary, for the submarine to communicate with friendly forces and headquarters. The installations on land can use large arrays of antennae to send messages even to submerged submarines, but the submarine can not use the same technology to send answers while being submerged. One option for sending messages from the submarine to the onshore installations would be to surface and make use of radio communication, but as explained before this is not a good tactical choice. In this very situation the SLOT buoy has its primary usecase. The submarine records a (coded) message on the buoy, launches the buoy while staying submerged, the buoy ascends to the surface of the water and stays inactive for the moment while the submerged submarine leaves the area. After a preset duration, e.g. one hour, the buoy starts to emit the message by radio waves. The message is then picked up by a communication satellite or other friendly forces and relayed to the final addressee. Later, the buoy will scuttle itself to deny further information to the enemy. During its inactive time the buoy is very hard to detect for the enemy due to its small size and semi-submersed condition. When it gets active and sends out the message on the other hand it is very easy to detect and locate for the enemy. But at this moment the submarine has long left the vicinity of the buoy and therefore to locate the position of the submarine by using the position of the buoy is very unlikely, e.g. only as precise as somewhere in a 50 km perimeter around the buoy. Basically the commander of the submarine when deciding on the use and time delay of the SLOT buoy has to balance the urgency of the message against the danger for the boat.

Additionally since an active SLOT buoy attracts hostile forces it can be used as decoy or bait. Because the hostile forces moving towards the buoy may leave gaps in the hostile formation they can be exploited by friendly forces. Using the buoy as bait to attract hostile forces and then to attack them is also a possible but very risky tactic.

=== Emergency ===
A civilian as well as military application of the SLOT buoy is the use as emergency message transmitter. If a submerged submarine faces a problem that prevents it from reaching the surface of the ocean, e.g. problems with the ballast tank, it can record a distress call on the buoy and launch it. The buoy will ascend to the surface and immediately activate the radio transmitter and send out the emergency message. Additionally to the content of the message the easily detected position of the buoy, which will be nearly right above the submerged submarine will be of great help for the rescue party too.

== Trivia ==
- SLOT buoys are part of the equipment of many US-submarines like the Los-Angeles class.
