= Electus D. Litchfield =

American architect

Electus Darwin Litchfield
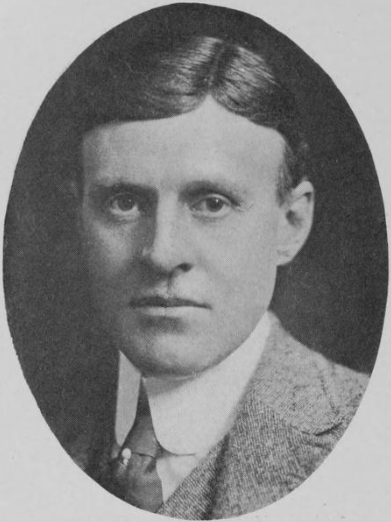
- Born: April 25, 1872; New York City, New York, US
- Died: November 27, 1952 (aged 80); New York City, New York, US
- Education: Brooklyn Polytechnic Institute; Stevens Institute of Technology
- Occupation: Architect
- Spouse: Elizabeth B. Rodman (m. 1906)

Electus Darwin Litchfield, FAIA (1872–1952) was an American architect and town planner, practicing in New York City. His firm, Electus D. Litchfield, established in 1926, practiced at 80 Fifth Avenue until he disestablished it in 1950.

== Career ==
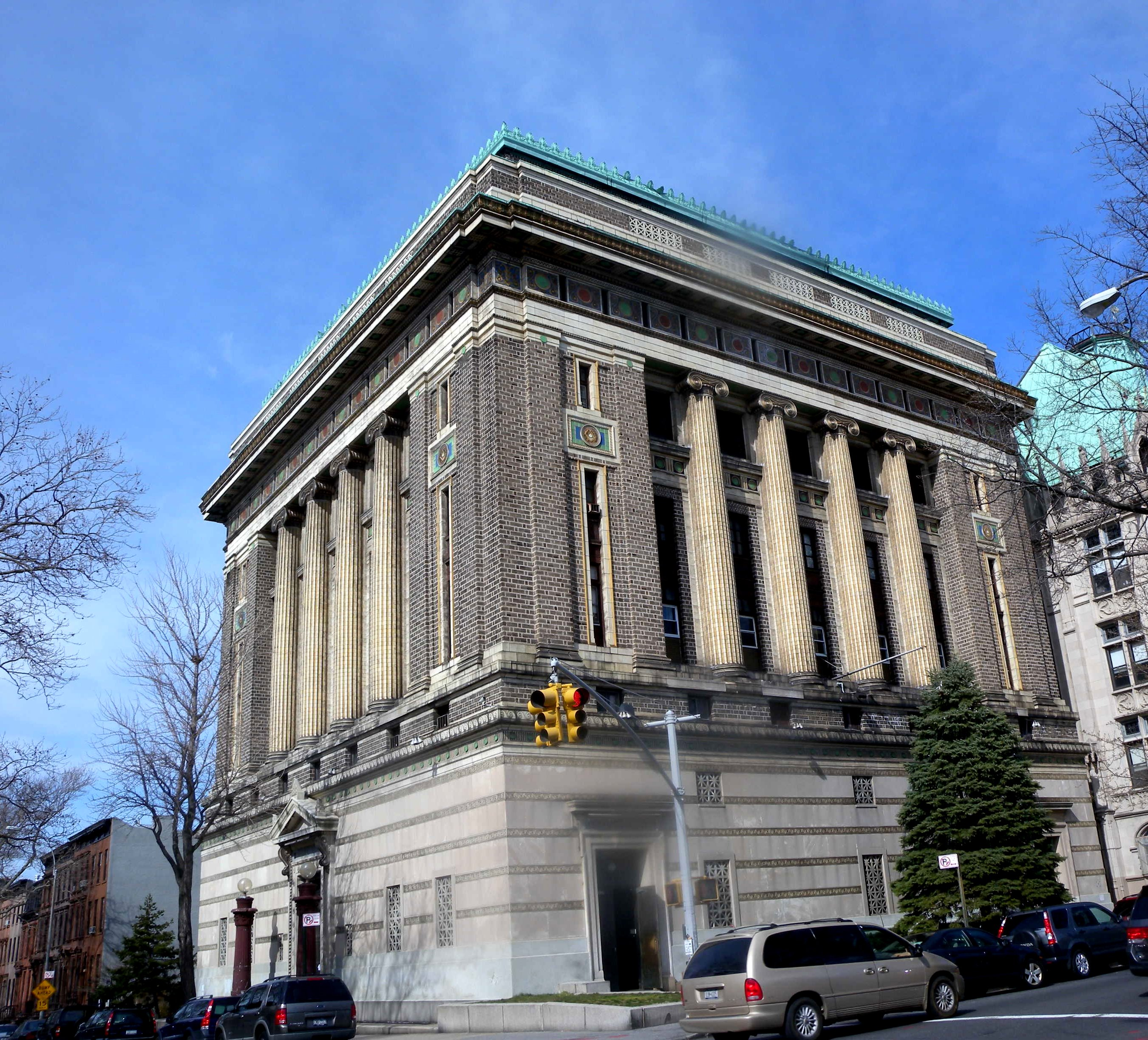
Masonic Temple, Brooklyn

Born in New York City on April 25, 1872, Litchfield graduated from Brooklyn Polytechnic Institute in 1889 and Stevens Institute of Technology in 1892. He married Elizabeth B. Rodman on October 6, 1906, and they had two children.

He worked at various firms in New York, including Carrère & Hastings and Lord & Hewlett, before establishing his own in 1926, designing a number of commercial buildings.

"He was a devotee of municipal beautification." He was one of the main architects and town planners of Yorkship Village, a World War I industrial town of 2,000 homes near the shipyard in Camden, New Jersey. "He was also an architect for the Red Hook slum clearance and housing project, assisted in reconstruction of Bellevue Hospital, and designed the Brooklyn Masonic Temple."

Outside of New York, Litchfield designed "many public and commercial buildings and monuments, including the public library in St. Paul; the National Armory in Washington, and a monument to the Lewis and Clark expedition at Astoria, Ore." He disestablished his firm in 1950.

He designed the Franklin Pierce Tate House (1928) at Morganton, North Carolina.

== Organization membership ==
In the 1930s, as president of the Municipal Art Society, he fought a proposal to renovate Central Park with numerous baseball fields.

He was a Fellow of the American Institute of Architects, member of the Architectural League of New York, New York Fine Arts Federation, the Beaux-Arts Institute of Design, and Building Revision Commission (1906–1907), a former director of the Citizens Housing and Planning Council, a founder of the New York Building Congress, and a "former governor of the Society of Colonial Wars of New York, and a member of the General Society of Colonial Wars, the City Club of New York and The Pilgrims."

== Rehabilitation of Lieutenant William S. Cox ==
Mr. Litchfield had come into the news as the grandson of William S. Cox, a naval lieutenant in the War of 1812, whose commission had been revoked by court-martial in 1814.

Lieutenant Cox had helped carry the dying Capt. James Lawrence below decks of the frigate Chesapeake during a battle with the British at Boston Harbor. As the result of leaving the scene of the fighting while senior uninjured officer, Mr. Cox was demoted.

For forty years, Mr. Litchfield sought to have the Navy remove the stigma of that decision. On Sept. 8 he won his fight when the Navy presented to him at St. Barnabas a certificate of restoration of Mr. Cox's commission authorized by the President and the Congress.

== Death and legacy ==
Litchfield was a lifetime New Yorker, residing at 171 East Seventy-third Street. He died aged 80 at St. Barnabas Hospital in the Bronx on November 27, 1952. He was survived by his widow Elizabeth, daughter Mrs. Elizabeth Lamble of Sarasota, Florida, and son, Burnham Litchfield of Edgartown, Massachusetts.
