= SS Empire Arrow =

Arrow-class oil tanker (1921–1939)

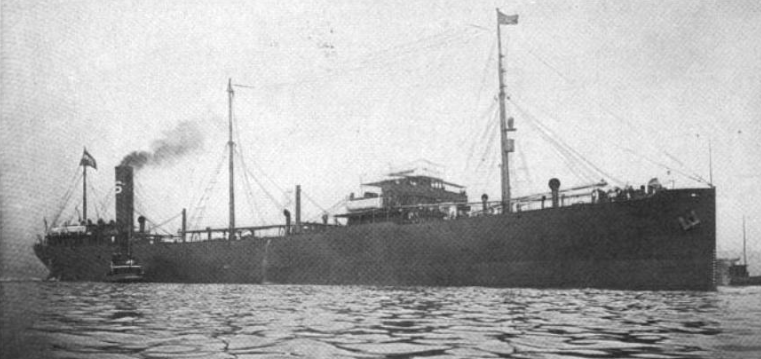
- Empire Arrow undergoing her sea trials in October 1921

History
- Name: Empire Arrow
- Owner: Socony (1921–1931); Socony-Vacuum Transport Company (1931–1935); Socony-Vacuum Oil Company (1935–1938); Northern Metals Company (1938–1939)
- Operator: Standard Transportation Company (1921–1931); Standard-Vacuum Transportation Company (1931–1934); Socony-Vacuum Oil Company (1934–1938); Northern Metals Company (1938–1939)
- Port of registry: (United States) New York
- Builder: New York Shipbuilding Corporation, Camden, New Jersey
- Yard number: 261
- Laid down: September 14, 1920
- Launched: May 24, 1921
- Completed: September 1921
- In service: 1921–1939
- Identification: US official number: 221600; Code letters: MDOT (1921–1934); Code letters: KDUG (1934–1939)
- Fate: Sold for steel and scrapped at Philadelphia, 1939

General characteristics
- Tonnage: 8,046 GRT; 4,960 NRT
- Length: 468 ft 3 in (142.72 m)
- Beam: 62 ft 7 in (19.08 m)
- Depth: 32 ft (9.75 m)
- Propulsion: 1 x quadruple expansion steam engine (New York Shipbuilding Corporation) 625 hp (466 kW)
- Speed: 10.5 knots (12.1 mph; 19.4 km/h)
- Crew: 39

SS Empire Arrow was an American steam powered oil tanker of the Arrow class. She was built for Socony, and served from 1921 until she was scrapped in 1939.

== Construction ==
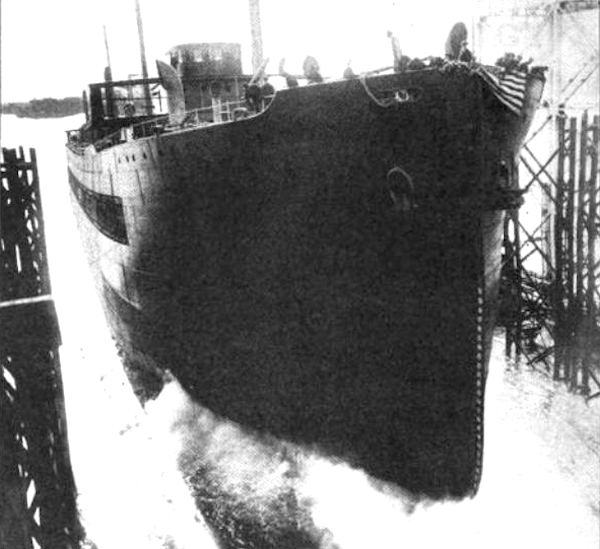
The launch of Empire Arrow on May 24, 1921

Empire Arrow was built by the New York Shipbuilding Corporation in Camden, New Jersey. The tanker was ordered on March 1, 1920. Her keel was laid on September 14 as hull number 261. Empire Arrow was launched on May 24, 1921, sponsored by Mrs. C.M. Higgins. The tanker was finally completed in September. She was the last ship built on South Yard Shipway No 2.

The tanker was assigned the US official number 221600 and the code letters MDOT, though she would only use those until 1934, when they were replaced by KDUG.

=== Specifications ===
Empire Arrow was 468.3 feet (142.7 m) long, 62.7 feet (19.1 m) wide, and had a depth of 32.0 feet (9.8 m). She was 8,046 gross register tons and 4,960 net register tons. The tanker was powered by a quadruple expansion steam engine of 625 horsepower (466 kW) built by New York Shipbuilding Corporation. The cylinders were 24, 36, 51 and 75 inches (610, 914, 1,295 and 1,905 mm) in diameter and the stroke was 51 inches (1,295 mm). The engine drove a single screw. She was capable of 10.5 knots (12.1 mph; 19.4 km/h).

== Service history ==
Empire Arrow's first voyages were complete circumnavigations, sailing from both the east and west coasts of the United States while bound for the Philippines, China, Japan, and other destinations in East Asia. The tanker refueled and reloaded her cargo in the Dutch East Indies before conducting backhauls to mainland Europe and the United Kingdom. She was withdrawn from foreign service in 1933, carrying oil from Beaumont, Texas, to New York City.

The tanker was in the waters off of New England in 1938 when a hurricane struck, severely damaging her.

Empire Arrow was sold for her steel to the Northern Metals Company in December 1938. She was scrapped in Philadelphia, Pennsylvania, after she arrived on January 10, 1939.

=== Ownership ===
Empire Arrow was built for the Standard Transportation Company In 1931, she was transferred to the Standard-Vacuum Transportation Company. In 1934, she was transferred to the Socony-Vacuum Oil Company.
