= USS Shreveport (LPD-12) =

Austin-class amphibious transport dock

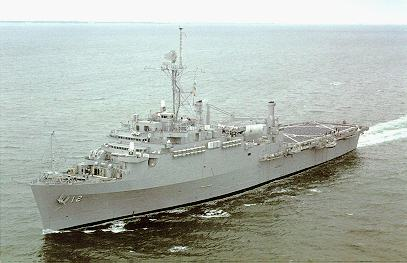
- USS Shreveport

History

United States
- Name: Shreveport
- Namesake: Shreveport, Louisiana
- Operator: United States Navy
- Ordered: 15 May 1964
- Laid down: 27 December 1965
- Launched: 22 October 1966
- Sponsored by: Mrs. Andrew McBurney Jackson, Jr.
- Commissioned: 12 December 1970
- Decommissioned: 26 September 2007
- Identification: Hull number: LPD-12
- Motto: No Shore Too Distant, Alone and Unafraid
- Nickname(s): Super Gator
- Fate: Scrapped in Brownsville 2022

General characteristics
- Class & type: Austin-class amphibious transport dock
- Tonnage: 7,771 DWT
- Displacement: 9,195 long tons (9,343 t) light; 16,966 long tons (17,238 t) full
- Length: 173.7 m (569 ft 11 in) LOA; 167 m (547 ft 11 in) LWL
- Beam: 30.4 m (99 ft 9 in) extreme; 25.6 m (84 ft 0 in) BWL
- Draft: 6.7 m (22 ft 0 in) maximum; 7 m (23 ft 0 in) limit
- Speed: 21 knots (39 km/h; 24 mph)
- Complement: 58 officers, 502 enlisted
- Armament: 4 × 3-inch/50-caliber guns; or; 2 × 3-inch/50 cal. guns and 2 Phalanx CIWS

USS Shreveport (LPD-12) was an Austin-class amphibious transport dock. It was the second ship of the United States Navy to be named for the city in Louisiana. Her keel was laid down on 27 December 1965 by the Lockheed Shipbuilding and Construction Company of Seattle, Washington. She was launched on 22 October 1966 sponsored by Mrs. Andrew McBurney Jackson Jr., and commissioned on 12 December 1970.

== History ==
=== 1970s ===
On 22 January 1971, Shreveport departed Puget Sound for her homeport, Naval Station Norfolk, Virginia, where she arrived on 21 February. Between 9 March and 9 April 1971, the amphibious transport dock underwent shakedown training at Guantanamo Bay, Cuba, and, from 16 June to 4 August, she carried 375 midshipmen from the United States Naval Academy on a training cruise to Northern Europe. After post shakedown repairs from 6 October to 24 November 1971, she sailed for the Caribbean Sea, where she participated in landing exercises during the first part of 1972. On 12 June, the ship again sailed on a midshipman training cruise to Northern Europe, visiting the Azores; Aalborg, Denmark; Portsmouth, England; and Le Havre, France; before returning to Norfolk, on 3 August. During the rest of 1972, Shreveport conducted amphibious training exercises off the coasts of Virginia, North Carolina, and Florida.

Shreveport, with Amphibious Squadron 2, departed Norfolk on 4 January 1973 for her first tour of duty with the United States Sixth Fleet in the Mediterranean Sea. The squadron stopped at Morehead City, North Carolina, and embarked elements of the Sixth Marines (BLT 1/6) before it proceeded to Rota, Spain, where the vessel was assigned to CTF 61. The task force departed Rota on 16 January, called at Cannes, France, on 18 January, and was underway for Monte Romano, Italy, on 22 January. During her six-month deployment, Shreveport also visited ports in Italy, Greece, Crete, and Turkey before returning to Morehead City on 2 July. The Marines were offloaded, and the ship continued to Norfolk that afternoon.

Shreveport operated in the Norfolk area until February 1974 when she sailed, with PhibRon 2, for operations in the Caribbean. She returned to her home port on 19 March. The ship made another trip south to the Panama Canal area that lasted from 18 April to 4 June. On 24 June, Shreveport sailed for Rotterdam and another deployment with the Sixth Fleet.

Throughout 1974 and half of 1975, Shreveport was the flagship of the Caribbean Amphibious Ready Group and participated in various fleet exercises with the Marine Corps, occasionally also with South American Forces. In July 1975, she deployed back to the Mediterranean where she participated in a major NATO exercise involving British, Turkish and U.S. navies. During the return trip to Norfolk in February 1976, the ship's flag bridge was destroyed by a 40-foot (12 m) wave off Cape Hatteras. Thereafter Shreveport returned to fleet exercises in the Caribbean until September 1979 when she began another Mediterranean deployment where she completed four major amphibious operations with various European allies.

=== 1980s ===
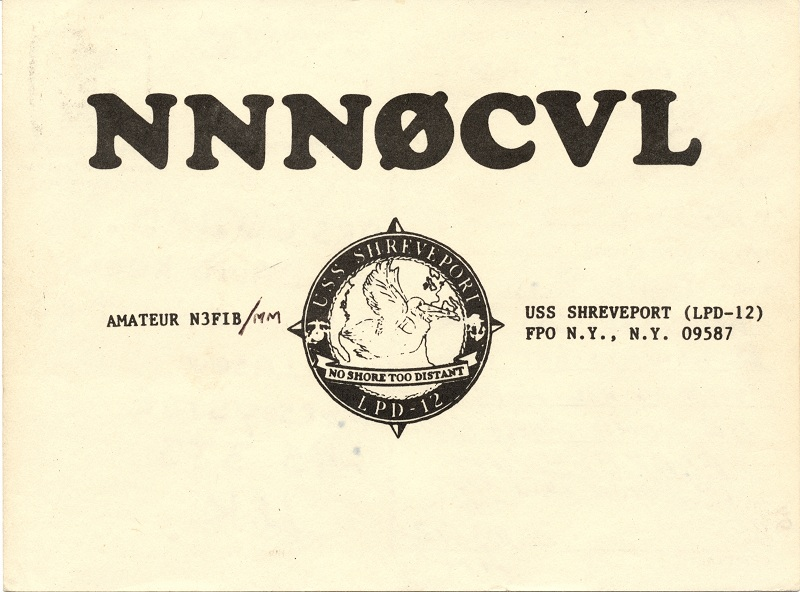
QSL card of the MARS radio station aboard Shreveport

In September 1981, Shreveport visited Cancún, Mexico to support President Ronald Reagan's participation in the North-South Economic Summit.

During a Mediterranean cruise that began in August 1982, Shreveport spent four months off the coast of Beirut, Lebanon. As a result of this operation, she received the Navy Unit Commendation and the Navy Expeditionary Medal. In July 1984, she broke the world record for transiting the Suez Canal. In late 1984, she received the Meritorious Unit Commendation for conducting mine clearing operations in the Red Sea in support of Operation Intense Look. Later in the deployment, she was called to action off the Lebanese coast. Following the bombing of the US Embassy in Beirut, Shreveport provided critical medical evacuation and logistics support services. After making port calls in Marseille, France, and Malaga and Rota, Spain, she returned to Norfolk.

=== 1990s and Operation Desert Shield/Storm ===
From 15 August 1990 to 17 April 1991, Shreveport was deployed to the Persian Gulf in support of Operations Desert Shield and Desert Storm with Commander, Amphibious Squadron Six embarked. Her involvement in this conflict helped to earn her the Arleigh Burke Fleet Trophy for Operational Readiness in January 1992. During a Mediterranean deployment in November 1993, Shreveport was assigned to Mogadishu, Somalia in support of Operation Restore Hope.

From 1994 and 1995 saw Shreveport participating in Operation Provide Promise in the Adriatic Sea by flying video reconnaissance missions over Bosnia-Herzegovina utilizing the Pioneer UAV. During this time, she also served in the first amphibious Partnership for Peace exercise in Bulgaria.

From December 1995 to February 1996, Shreveport participated in Operations Deny Flight, Provide Promise, and Joint/Decisive Endeavor in the Adriatic sea. On 3 October 1997, Shreveport deployed for yet another Mediterranean cruise.

While operating in the Black Sea, Shreveport conducted a Change of Command ceremony in Constanţa, Romania on 11 December 1997. In early February 1998, she was called away from her original schedule and spent the remainder of the deployment operating in the Persian Gulf in support of Operation Southern Watch. From July 1998 – November 1998 she underwent a Metro machine Dry Dock Phased Maintenance Availability.

Was awarded the Commander, Naval Surface, U.S. Atlantic Fleet Battle Efficiency Award and Safety Award for 1998 and 1999, as well as her sixth consecutive Engineering "E", seventh Maritime Warfare "E", third Operations "E", first Logistics "E" and first Medical "H".

From September 1999 to April 2000 Shreveport deployed on a Mediterranean Cruise where she spent time in the Mediterranean Sea and Persian Gulf supporting exercises Bright Star, Noble Shirley, Infinite Moonlight.

=== 2000s and Hurricane Katrina ===
On 16 February 2000, Shreveport ran aground in the Suez Canal, on her way back into the Mediterranean Sea from the Red Sea. The ship sustained damage to her starboard propeller, propeller shaft, rudder and steering system. Shreveport's captain was relieved of command. Damages were estimated at $932,000.

From September 2001 to April 2002 Shreveport deployed on a Mediterranean Cruise to the Persian Gulf to support Operation Enduring Freedom.

From May 2003 Fleet week New York City. From February 2004 to September 2004 Shreveport deployed on a Mediterranean Cruise to the Persian Gulf to support Operation Enduring Freedom and Operation Iraqi Freedom as part of the Wasp Amphibious Ready Group

On 31 August 2005 USS Shreveport deployed with the Iwo Jima Amphibious Ready Group where USS Bataan had been since the day that the city of New Orleans was stricken and flooded in the aftermath of Hurricane Katrina.

=== Final voyage and decommissioning ===
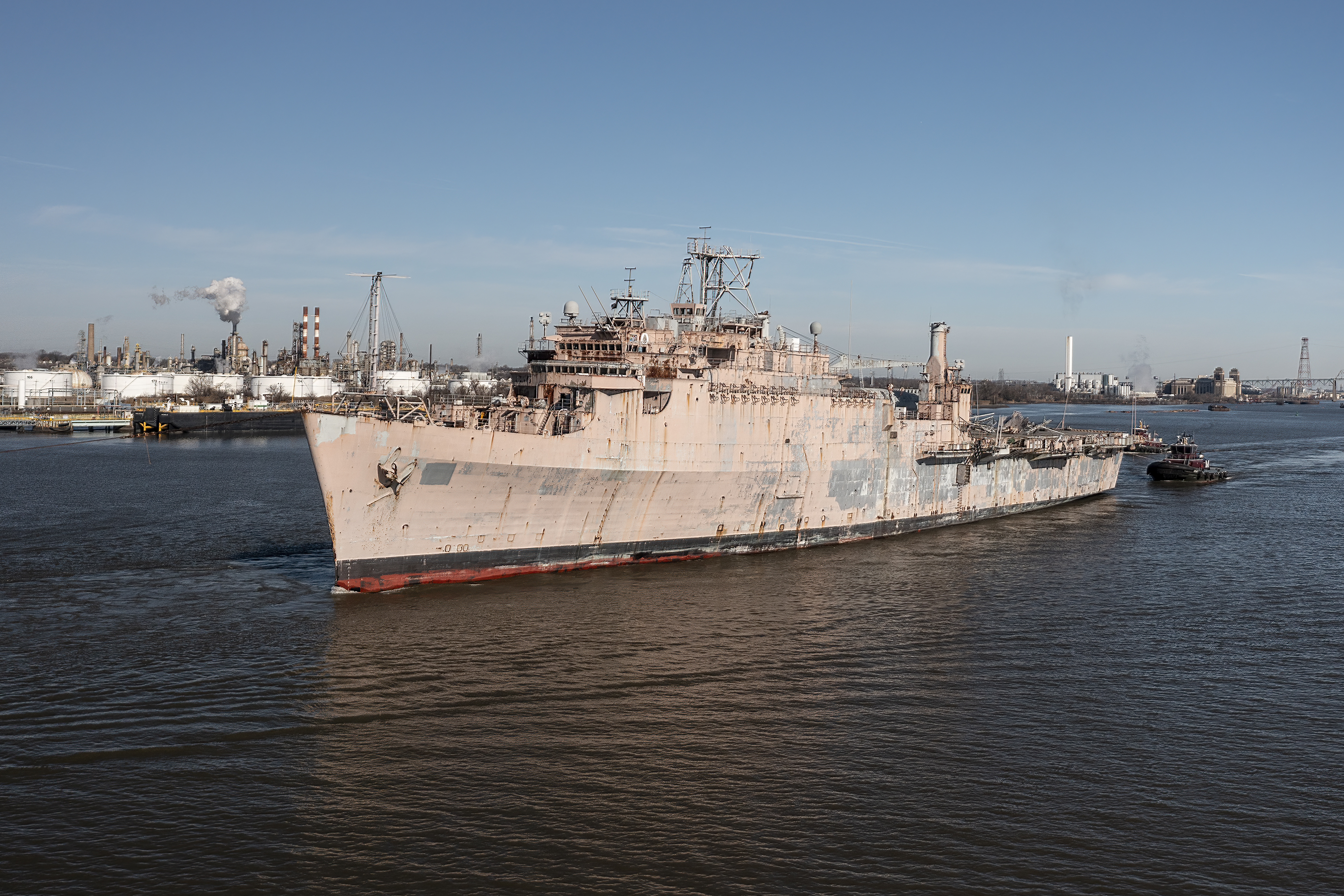
Ex USS Shreveport, towed by Southern Dawn, passes Marcus Hook on her journey down the Delaware River from the Philadelphia Inactive Ship Maintenance Facility to breakers at Brownsville, Texas

After one last deployment in January 2007 as part of the Bataan Expeditionary Strike Group with her final Commanding Officer, Captain Paul Monger, Shreveport was decommissioned on 28 September 2007 and towed to the Naval Inactive Ship Maintenance Facility in Philadelphia, Pennsylvania by USNS Apache.

On 14 December 2021, Shreveport was removed from the Philadelphia NIMSF, towed by the tugboat Southern Dawn to Brownsville, Texas, where it will be scrapped. It arrived in Brownsville on 27 December 2021.
