= USNS Apache =

Tugboat of the United States Navy

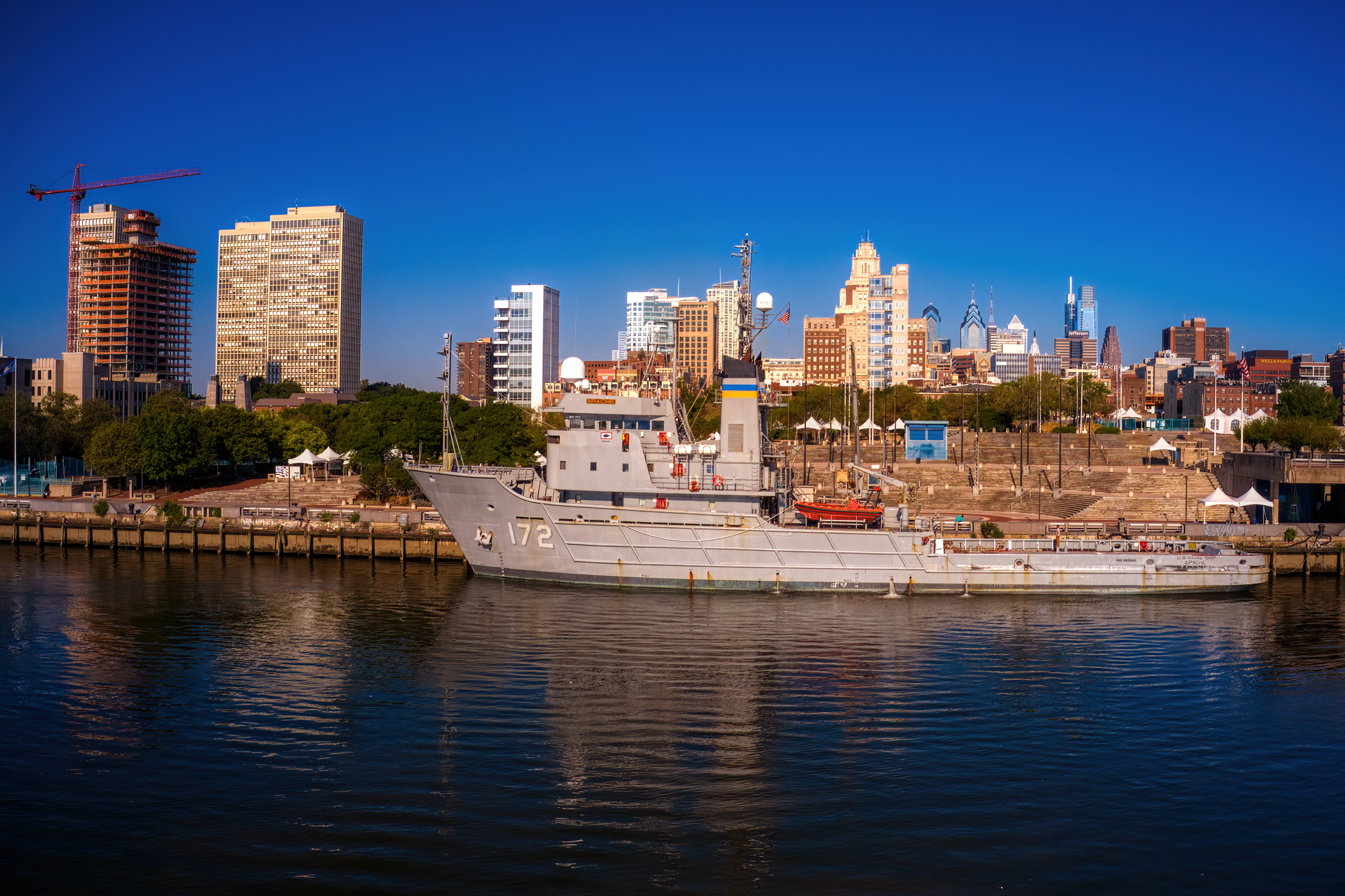
- USNS Apache berthed at Penn's Landing in Philadelphia.

History

United States
- Name: USNS Apache
- Namesake: The Apache people of the American southwest
- Operator: Military Sealift Command
- Builder: Marinette Marine Corporation, Marinette, Wisconsin
- Laid down: 22 March 1979
- Launched: 28 March 1981
- Sponsored by: Mrs. John R. Young
- In service: 23 July 1981
- Out of service: 26 August 2022
- Stricken: 30 September 2022
- Identification: Callsign: NIGP
- Motto: "First in Tow and Salvage"
- Status: Stricken, awaiting disposal

General characteristics
- Class & type: Powhatan-class tugboat
- Displacement: 2,260 long tons (2,296 t) fully loaded
- Length: 226 ft (69 m)
- Beam: 42 ft (13 m)
- Draught: 15 ft (4.6 m)
- Propulsion: Two GM EMD 20-645F7B Diesel engines, 3,600 hp (2,700 kW) each; two controllable pitch propellers
- Speed: 15 knots
- Range: 10,000 nautical miles (18,520 kilometers)
- Complement: 16 civilians, 4 Navy enlisted

USNS Apache (T-ATF-172) is a U.S. Navy Powhatan-class fleet ocean tugboat that was operated by the Military Sealift Command (MSC) from 1981 to 2022. She spent the bulk of her career in the Atlantic and Mediterranean.

== Construction and characteristics ==
The contract for the first four Powhatan-class tugs was awarded to Marinette Marine Co. on 12 September 1975. The Navy exercised its option to buy an additional three ships under this contract on 27 February 1978. Apache was the last ship delivered under this contract.

Apache was laid down on 22 March 1979 at the company's Marinette, Wisconsin, shipyard. She was launched on 28 March 1981. Apache was christened by Mrs. John R. Young. At the time of the launch, Commander Young was on the staff of Vice Admiral Clarence R. Bryan who, as commander of Naval Sea Systems Command, was in charge of buying ships for the Navy and dealt directly with Marinette Marine on the Powhatan-class tug contract. The ship was delivered to the Navy on 23 July 1981.

Her hull was built of welded steel plates. She was 225 feet 11 inches (68.86 m) long at the waterline and 240 feet 1 inch (73.18 m) overall, with a beam of 42 feet (13 m), and a draft of 15 feet (4.6 m). She displaced 2,260 tons fully loaded.

As originally built, Apache had two controllable-pitch Kort-nozzle propellers for propulsion. She had two 20-cylinder Diesel engines, GM EMD 20-645F7B, which provided 7,200 shaft horsepower. These would drive the ship at 15 knots. She also had a 300-horsepower bow thruster to improve maneuverability.

Electrical power aboard the ship was provided by three 400 Kw generators. These were powered by four Detroit Diesel 8v-71 engines.

Powhatan-class tugs had global range in order to support the U.S. fleet across oceans. Apache's tankage was consequently large. She could carry 206,714 U.S. gallons (782,500 L) of Diesel oil, 6,100 U.S. gallons (23,000 L) of lube oil, and 6,000 U.S. gallons (23,000 L) of drinking water. Her unrefueled range at 13 knots was 10,000 miles (16,000 km)

Apache's aft deck was largely open to accommodate a number of different roles. It had 4,000 square feet (370 m^{2}) of working space. The towing system could produce as much as 90 short tons of bollard pull. She had a 10-ton capacity crane for moving loads on the aft deck. There were connections to bolt down shipping containers and other equipment.

Like all MSC ships, Apache was crewed by civilian mariners. At launch, her complement was 16 civilian crew and a 4-person military detachment of communications specialists. The ship could accommodate an additional 16 people aboard for transient, mission-specific roles.

All the ships of the Powhatan-class were named after Native American tribes. Apache was named after the Apache people of the southwest United States.

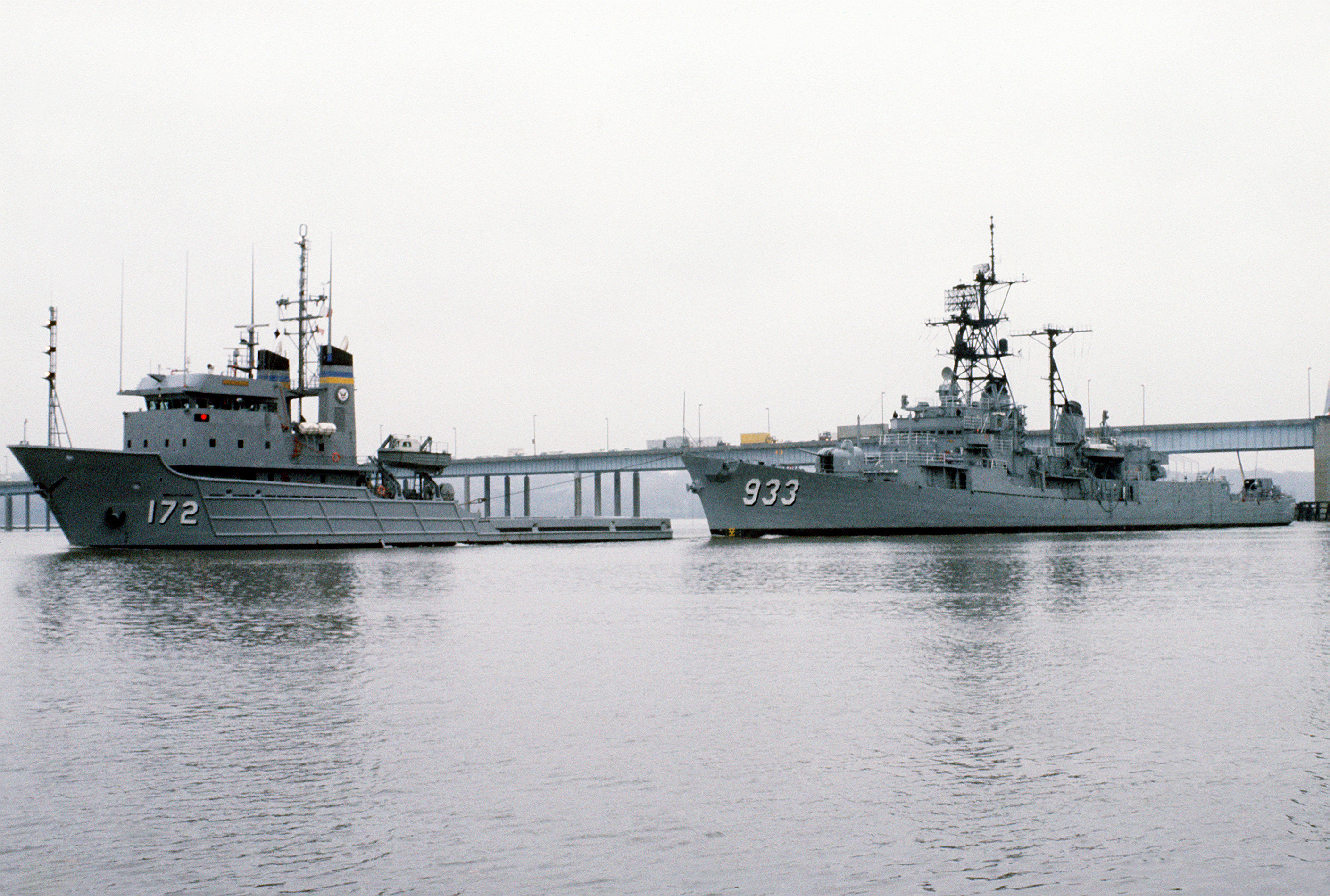
Apache towing the decommissioned destroyer ex-Barry (DD-933) on the Anacostia River in Washington, D.C., on 18 November 1983.

=== Towing equipment ===
One of the primary missions of fleet tugs was to tow damaged or disabled capital ships. For this mission, Apache could employ one of two winches. The main towing winch for large, long distance tows was a single drum, closed-loop SMATCO 66 DTS-200 electro-hydraulic drive winch. With a mechanically, pneumatically, or hydraulically actuated band brake and an air-actuated dog brake this was capable of holding 500,000 lbf of tension. The winch had 2,500 feet (760 m) of 2 1/4-inch IWRC 6×37 wire rope with a poured end fitting and a breaking strain of 424,000 lbf (1.89 MN). The cable weighed approximately 8.5 lb per foot (12.6 kg/m), making the weight of the wire approximately 21,500 lb (10.75 short tons) excluding the weight of any chain bridle used on the ship being towed.

The second winch was a Lake Shore traction machine capable of handling up to 15-inch (380 mm) synthetic hawsers used for smaller, shorter distance tows. The traction machine was capable of line pulls of up to 200,000 lbf (890 kN).

The stern employed a tow-pin box capable of capturing either the wire or synthetic towing lines, as well as Norman pins at the quarters.

== Service history ==
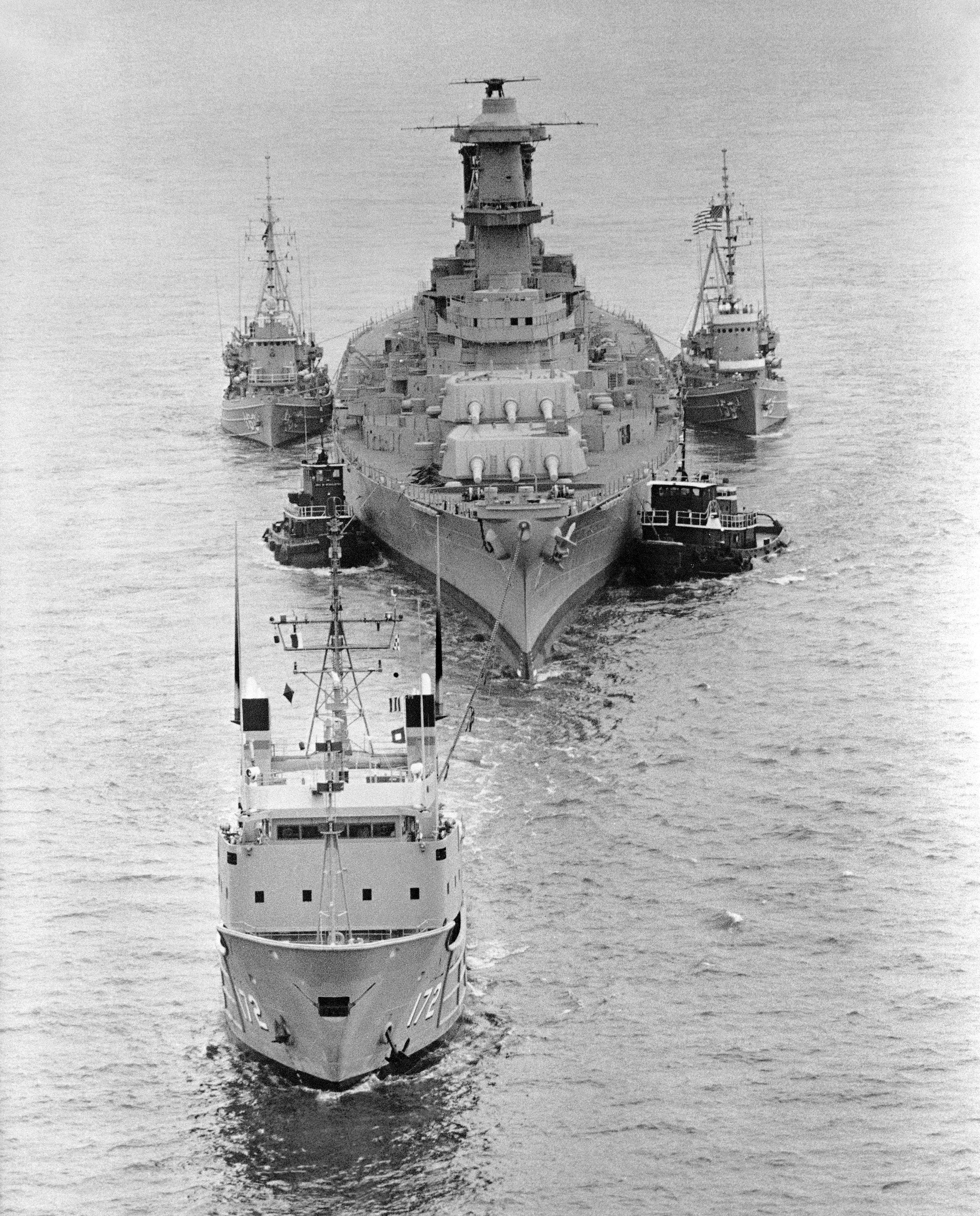
Apache tows ex-Iowa on her way to reactivation in 1982

On 22 May 1984, MSC held its first observance of National Maritime Day aboard Apache to commemorate the merchant seamen who were killed during America's wars. MSC commander Vice Admiral William H. Rowden, MSC vice-commander Rear Admiral Warren C. Hamm, Jr. and the retired commander of the Military Sea Transportation Service, Vice Admiral William M. Callaghan were aboard for the ceremony.

In the summer of 1987, Apache was deployed on a 3-week research mission to study the current state of the sunken Civil War ship USS Monitor. The tug hosted 24 NOAA scientists and technicians who examined the wreck with an unmanned submersible called "Deep Drone".

In August 1991, USNS Antares was crossing the Atlantic with equipment for the 24th Infantry Division in Saudi Arabia when she suffered disabling leaks in her boilers. Apache towed the ship to Rota, Spain for repair.

In the fall of 1994, Apache was dispatched to Haiti to support Operation Uphold Democracy.

On 1 December 1996, Apache arrived in Norfolk with USS Gonzalez in tow. The guided-missile destroyer had damage both propellers grounding on a coral reef and required a tow to the shipyard for repairs.

The ship was crossing the Atlantic to begin a deployment in the Mediterranean with the Sixth Fleet in November 2001 when she rescued four people from a sinking 80-foot sailboat approximately 1,400 miles southwest of the Azores.

In December 2002, Apache and an embarked detachment from Mobile Diving and Salvage Unit 2 trained Croatian Navy divers off Split.

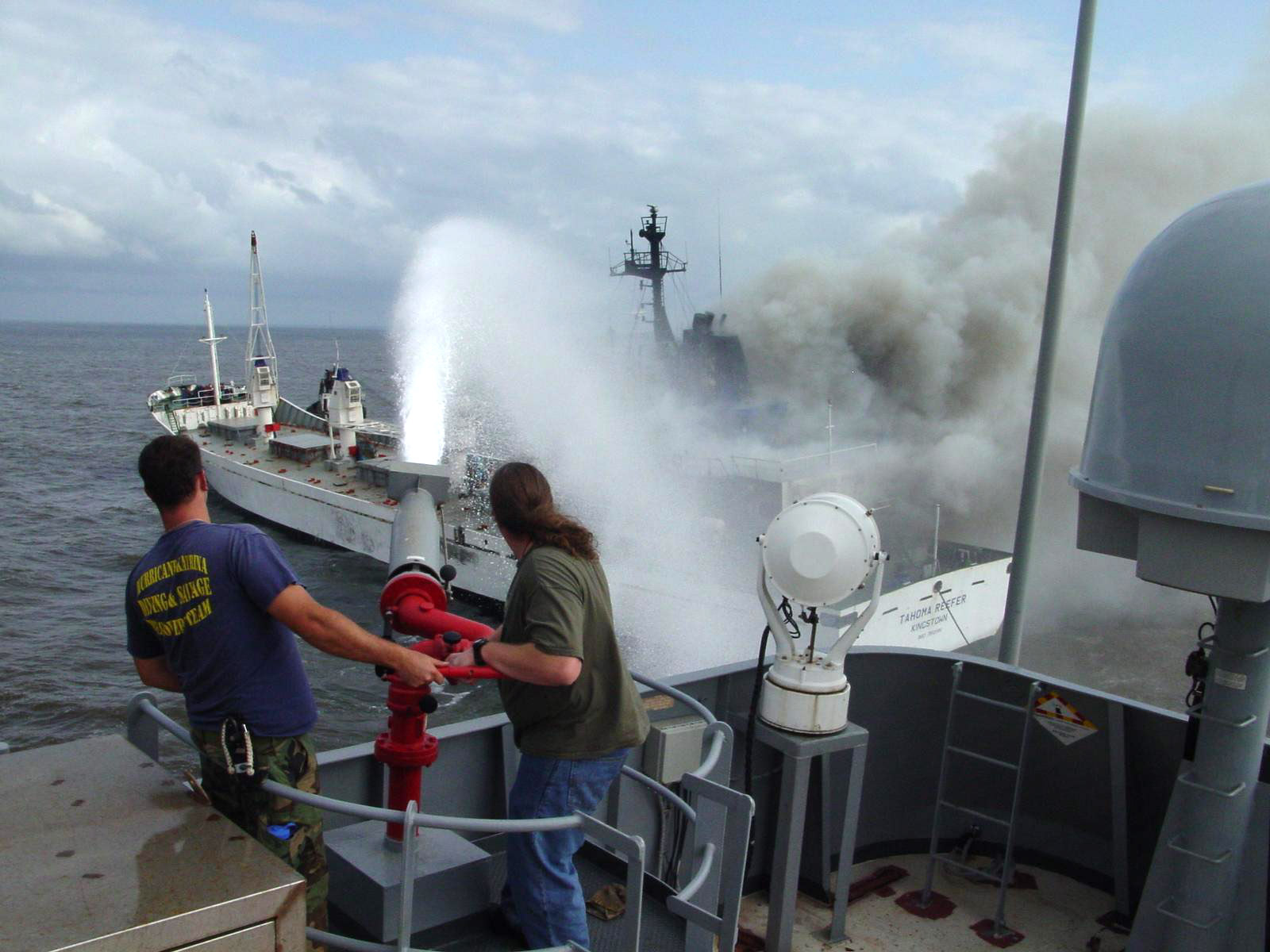
Apache fights fire on Tahoma Reefer in Monrovia in 2006

While on a six-month deployment with the Sixth Fleet in 2006, Apache, with an embarked detachment of Mobile Diving and Salvage Unit 2, held joint diving and salvage exercises with similar units of the French, Croatian, Albanian, Bulgarian, Romanian, Israeli, and Ghanaian navies. Her visit to Haifa, Israel was cut short when she sailed on 13 July 2006 as a precautionary measure due to fighting in the area. During this same deployment, Apache arrived in Monrovia on 9 August 2006 as part of a United States effort to strengthen relations with Liberia. She and her embarked detachment of divers were asked to survey wrecks in the harbor and assist in the repair of the port's commercial pier. During this visit, she rescued seven fishermen whose vessel had capsized. She also evacuated the crew and fought a fire aboard the cargo ship Tahoma Reefer.

While deployed with the Sixth Fleet, in August 2022, Apache embarked the Navy's Cable-operated Unmanned Recovery Vehicle (CURV) 21 to locate and salvage an F/A 18E Super Hornet which had blown off the deck of USS Harry S. Truman.

=== El Faro search ===
On 1 October 2015 the American-flagged containership El Faro sank in high winds and seas near the eye wall of Hurricane Joaquin east of the Bahamas. All thirty-three crew aboard died when the ship went down, the worst American maritime casualty of the century. Apache played a prominent role in investigating the wreck, garnering more press coverage than perhaps any other mission she undertook.

On 19 October 2015 Apache fueled and sailed from Norfolk to search for the wreck. For this mission she had embarked a side-scan sonar system called Orion, a voyage data recorder locator called the Towed Pinger Locator 25, the unmanned recovery vehicle CURV 21, and the specialists who could operate these tools.

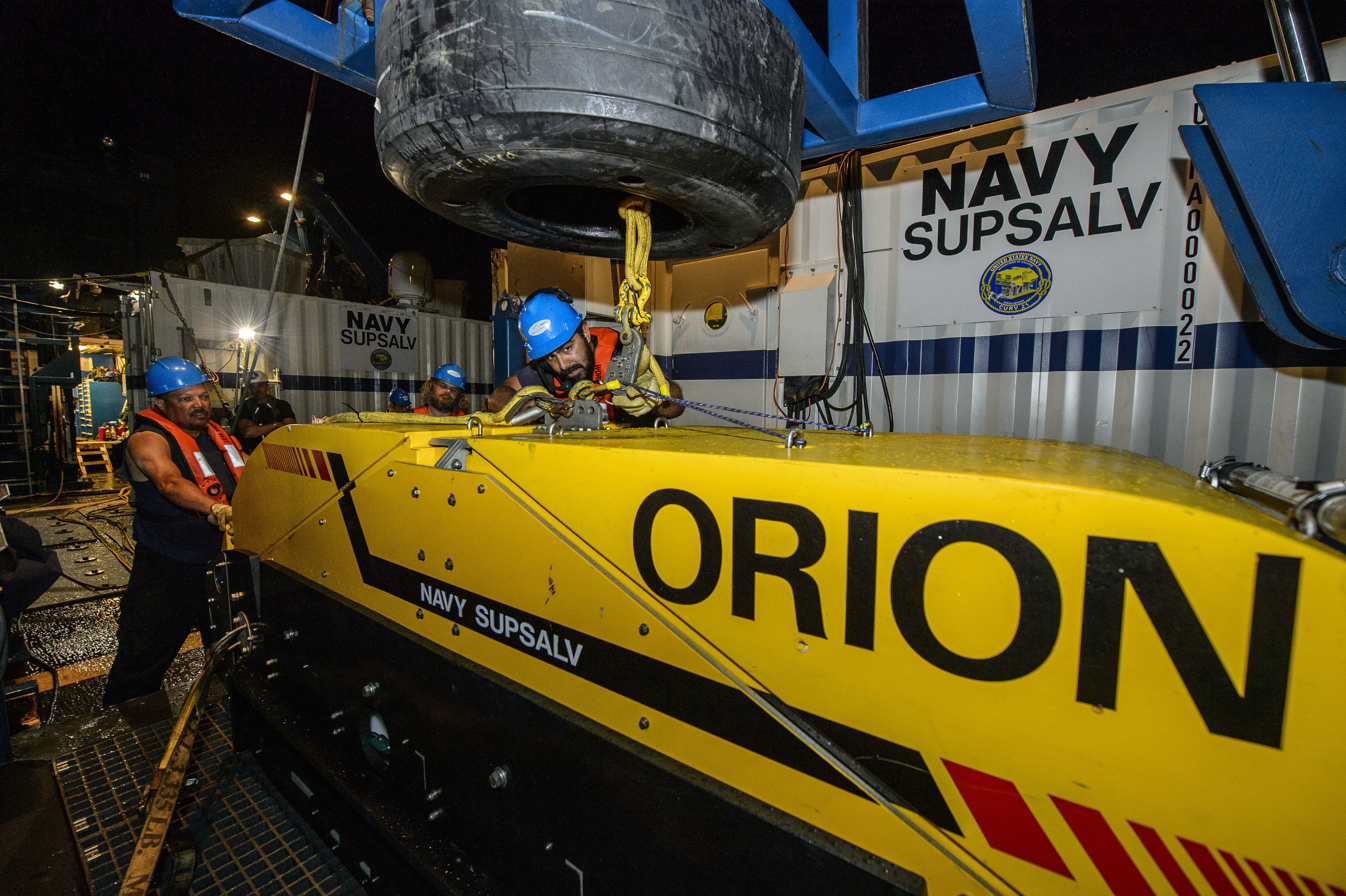
Technicians aboard Apache ready Orion side-scan sonar for deployment during El Faro search

Apache's first mission was to recover the voyage data recorder. This was an immediate priority because the batteries in the black box were not expected to last more than 30 days. Bad weather in the Atlantic forced Apache to divert from a direct course to the wreck site, so she had little more than four days to search before the expected end of the batteries. Apache was unable to locate the voyage data recorder using the TPL-25 hydrophone. Assuming that the batteries had died, Apache next deployed the Orion side-scan sonar system.

The sonar found the bulk of a ship resting on the bottom in 15,000 feet (4,600 m) of water on 31 October 2015. Using the cameras on CURV 21, Apache was able to confirm the wreck as El Faro. On 11 November 2015 the bridge of the ship, which had been torn from the hull, was located about a mile away. However, the voyage data recorder which was mounted on a bridge mast was no longer attached. Apache refueled in Puerto Rico, and returned to the scene of the sinking to search for the mast until the $1 million contract with the National Transportation Safety Board ran out.

In Mid-April 2016 the voyage data recorder was located by RV Atlantis. On 5 August, with a new $500,000 contract between the Navy and NTSB in place, Apache was dispatched from Virginia Beach with CURV 21 aboard. She recovered the device on 26 August 2016. She took the black box to Naval Station Mayport.

=== Decommissioned ship tows ===
Vessels which are retired from Navy service are often towed to various inactive ship maintenance facilities where they are held in reserve. Ultimately, they are towed on to their final fate. These decommissioned ships do not have full crews and cannot sail under their own power. Apache was frequently employed to tow decommissioned ships.

| Tow | From | To | Date | Notes |
|---|---|---|---|---|
| ex-Iowa | Philadelphia | Westwego, Louisiana | September 1982 | Iowa was towed to a shipyard to begin work to recommission the ship |
| ex-Barry | Philadelphia | Washington Navy Yard | November 1983 | Barry was moored as a museum ship |
| Marin (YTB-753) | Naval Station Guantanamo Bay | Portsmouth, Virginia | June 1990 | |
| ex-Charles F. Adams | Naval Station Mayport | Philadelphia | August 1990 | |
| ex-Coral Sea | Norfolk | Philadelphia | November 1990 | |
| ex-Groton | Portsmouth Naval Shipyard | | April 1998 | |
| ex-Samuel Gompers | Portsmouth, Virginia | Off North Carolina | July 2003 | Sunk in a live-fire exercise. |
| ex-Detroit | Naval Weapons Station Earle | Philadelphia | February 2005 | |
| ex-Hayes | Bayonne, New Jersey | Panama Canal | April 2007 | Hayes was on her way to a major refit and conversion to an acoustic research ship at the Tacoma Boatbuilding shipyard. |
| ex-Shreveport | Norfolk | Philadelphia | October 2007 | |
| ex-Forrestal | Naval Station Newport | Philadelphia | June 2010 | |
| ex-Miami | Portsmouth Naval Shipyard | San Diego | June–July 2015 | Towed from San Diego to Bremerton, Washington, by USNS Sioux for recycling |
| ex-Norfolk | Portsmouth Naval Shipyard | Panama Canal | April–May 2016 | Towed from Panama to Bremerton, Washington by USNS Sioux for recycling. |
| ex-Fort McHenry | Naval Station Mayport | Philadelphia | April 2021 | |
| ex-Whidbey Island | Little Creek, Virginia | Philadelphia | August 2022 | Incidentally, the main image on this page was taken just after delivery of ex-Whidbey Island to PNISMF. |

=== Ship tours ===
Apache was deployed for public relations and MSC recruiting purposes at a number of events where ship tours were offered. These included:

- Albany, New York's "Tall Ship's Weekend" festival in July 1986
- Albany's "Port Fest" celebration in July 1992.
- Norfolk, Virginia in September 1992.
- Rockland, Maine "Lobster Festival" in August 1995.
- New Haven, Connecticut's "Fourth Fest" in July 1996.

== Inactivation ==
A ceremony was held for the inactivation of Apache at Joint Expeditionary Base Little Creek-Fort Story, Virginia on 26 August 2022. Rear Admiral Michael Wettlaufer, commander of the Military Sealift Command spoke at the event. The ship was stricken on 30 September 2022.

== Honors and awards ==
Apache and her crew earned a number of awards and honors during her years of service. These include:

Meritorious Unit Commendation

Armed Forces Expeditionary Medal: 1993 and 1994 for her service in Operation Restore Hope, and 1996 for her service in Operation Uphold Democracy

Navy Unit Commendation: 1986

National Defense Service Medal

MSC Admiral of the Ocean Sea Mariner's Plaque: 2006 recognizing heroism in fighting the fire aboard Tahoma Reefer in Liberia

Department of the Navy Safety Excellence Award: 2006 recognizing no lost-time accidents in 2 1/2 years

MSC Maritime Excellence "E" Award: 2020
