= Atlantic Works Warehouse =

Historic building in Massachusetts

Atlantic Works
- Interactive map of the Atlantic Works area

General information
- Location: 80 Border Street, East Boston, Massachusetts, United States
- Coordinates: 42.37223°N 71.04215°W
- Completed: 1893, 133 years ago
- Owner: Atlantic Works, LLC

Technical details
- Floor count: 4

Atlantic Works is a historic building in East Boston, Massachusetts, United States. Located at 80 Border Street at its junction with Maverick Street, it was built in 1893 as the offices for Bethlehem Atlantic Works, a subsidiary of Bethlehem Shipbuilding Corporation, which was in business from 1853 until 1984 and produced steamship boilers and engines. It was the largest manufacturing company in East Boston for over a century.

The company moved here from Chelsea and Marion Streets, a few blocks to the northeast. The building was renovated in 2010. As of 2021, it is the home of Atlantic Works Cultural Center and Atlantic Works Gallery, an artists' space.

== Popular culture ==
The building appears in the 2015 film Black Mass in the scene in which Johnny Depp's character Whitey Bulger picks up his new recruit, Kevin Weeks.
