= Bethlehem Atlantic Works =

Shipyard in the United States

Coordinates: 42°21′51.87″N 71°2′6.83″W

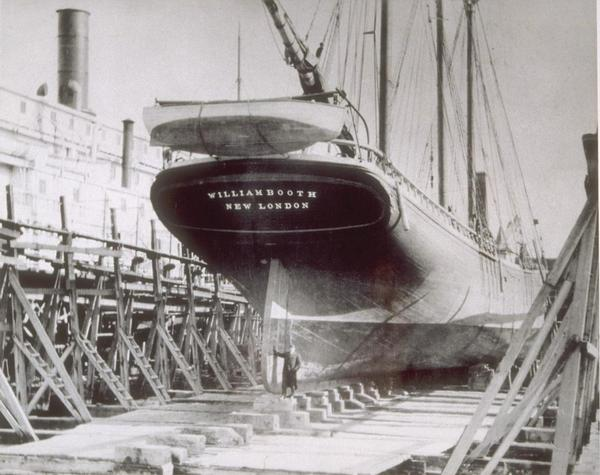
Schooner William Booth at Atlantic Works in 1910

Bethlehem Atlantic Works of East Boston, Massachusetts, was a shipyard in the United States active from 1853 until 1984. It was owned by the Bethlehem Shipbuilding Company. It is located directly to the west of the East Boston Immigration Station. The company's offices were in the Atlantic Works Warehouse, built in 1893.

== History (1853–1976) ==
It began as two separate shipyards. East Boston Dry Dock Company which started in 1853 along Chelsea and Marion streets by Samuel Hall, who later moved to Border Street in 1893 when they became the Atlantic Works where they constructed a three-story building that still stands. Then there was the Simpson Dry Dock Company, owned by James E. Simpson along Jeffries Point on Marginal Street facing the Boston Harbor. In 1922 the Atlantic Works was purchased by Bertelson & Peterson Company, and in 1928 Bethlehem Steel purchased both Atlantic Works and the Simpson Yard and renamed them Bethlehem Atlantic divisions of Bethlehem Steel.

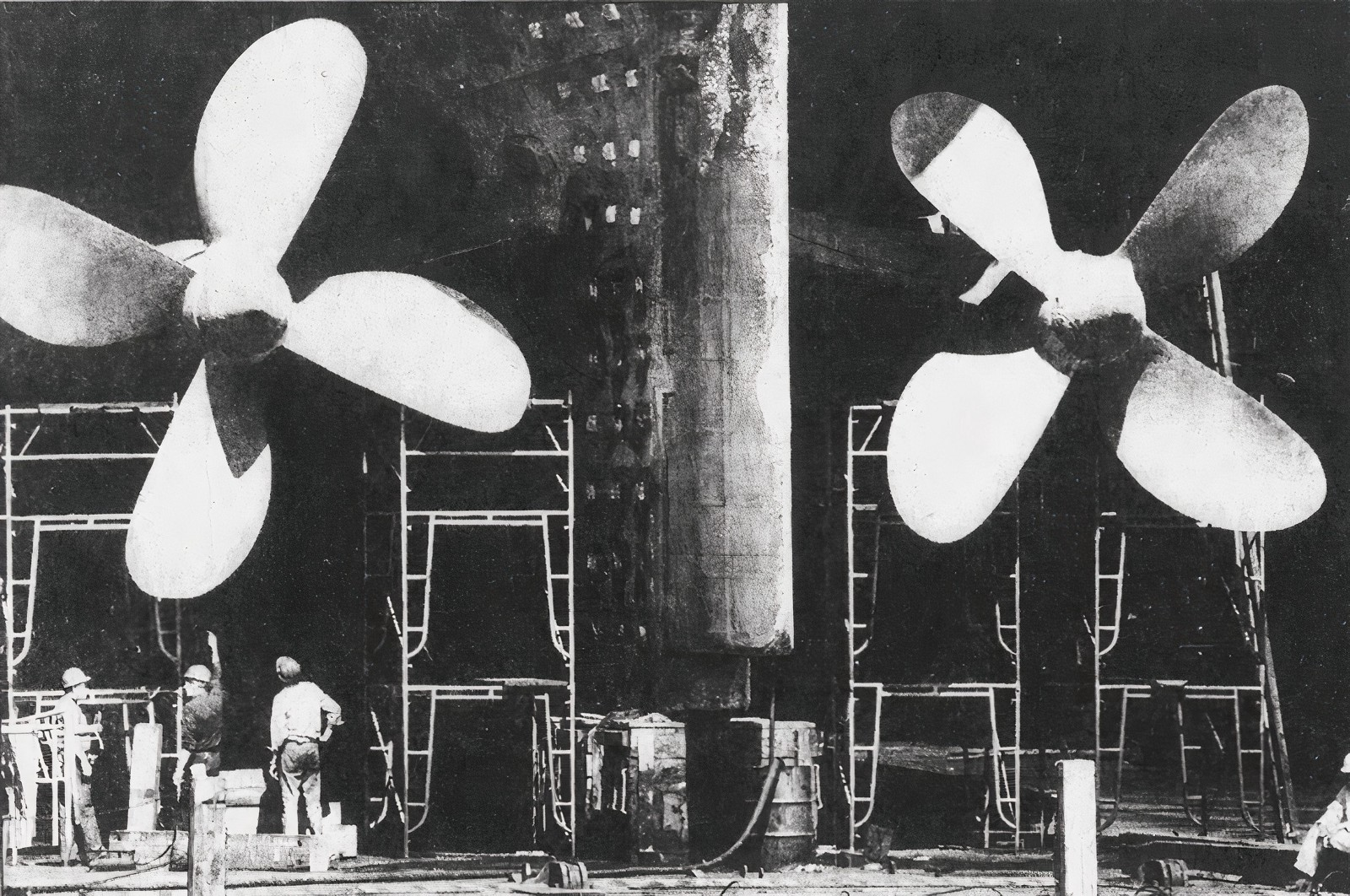
Propellers of Navy ship undergoing overhaul dwarf workers in 1982.

As far back as the Civil War and during WWI, the Navy used the service of these companies to repair most of their damaged fleet. The Atlantic Works received heavy use during WWII employing up to 1000 men, where they were used to repair Naval and Coast Guard fleet. They were the largest private ship repair facility in Boston for over a century which included a steam-powered floating dry dock capable of lifting 500-ton ships. Its 600-foot-long marine railway had a cradle with an unprecedented capacity of 1000 tons. Railways with capacities of 1500, 2000, and 2500 tons were built later–all by Crandall Dry Dock Engineers. During the same time period the Bethlehem-Simpson docks were employing over 6000 men. During the 1950s and 1960s the Bethlehem Steel corporations were going through a series of bankruptcies and downsizing in New England. In 1951 they sold Atlantic Works and closed down the shipyard, and they also sold off Fore River to General Dynamics in 1964.

The Simpson Docks remained the last shipyard owned by Bethlehem Steel in Massachusetts that continued until the year 1984. During its history they operated the largest railway in Boston and second largest in the country. For most of its life it was referred to by locals as the "East Boston Yard". One of their largest later projects was a $6.6 million contract to overhaul the destroyer USS Forrest Sherman in 1976. They also constructed a new Buzzards Bay and Brenton Reef light towers in a 1961 and 1962 project costing $1.5 million, the main navigational aid for all shipping bound for Cape Cod canal.

== Race controversies (1976–1984) ==
During the late 1970s and 1980s there were a series of racial assaults and attacks along this shipyard at the height of the Boston desegregation busing crisis. First on July 1, 1976, when it was reported that five youth threw rocks and bottles at black seaman Kevin A. Kaminsky aboard the USS Blandy and four other black men as they waited at a bus stop on their way back to the shipyard. On July 15, a molotov cocktail was thrown at a black sailor aboard the ship. Two years later in July 1978 five black sailors were jumped by a "gang of whites wielding sticks". No arrests were made. On July 13, sailor Anthony McGhee aboard the USS Barry was stabbed in the back twice by a group of 12–20 persons gathered near the corner of Monument and Bunker Hill streets. One day later on July 14, 1980, Seaman Michael J. Robinson, 25, of Cincinnati, stationed aboard the USS Edson, was beaten with a baseball bat during a fight between a group of black sailors and a group of local youths. He died 10 days later at Massachusetts General Hospital.

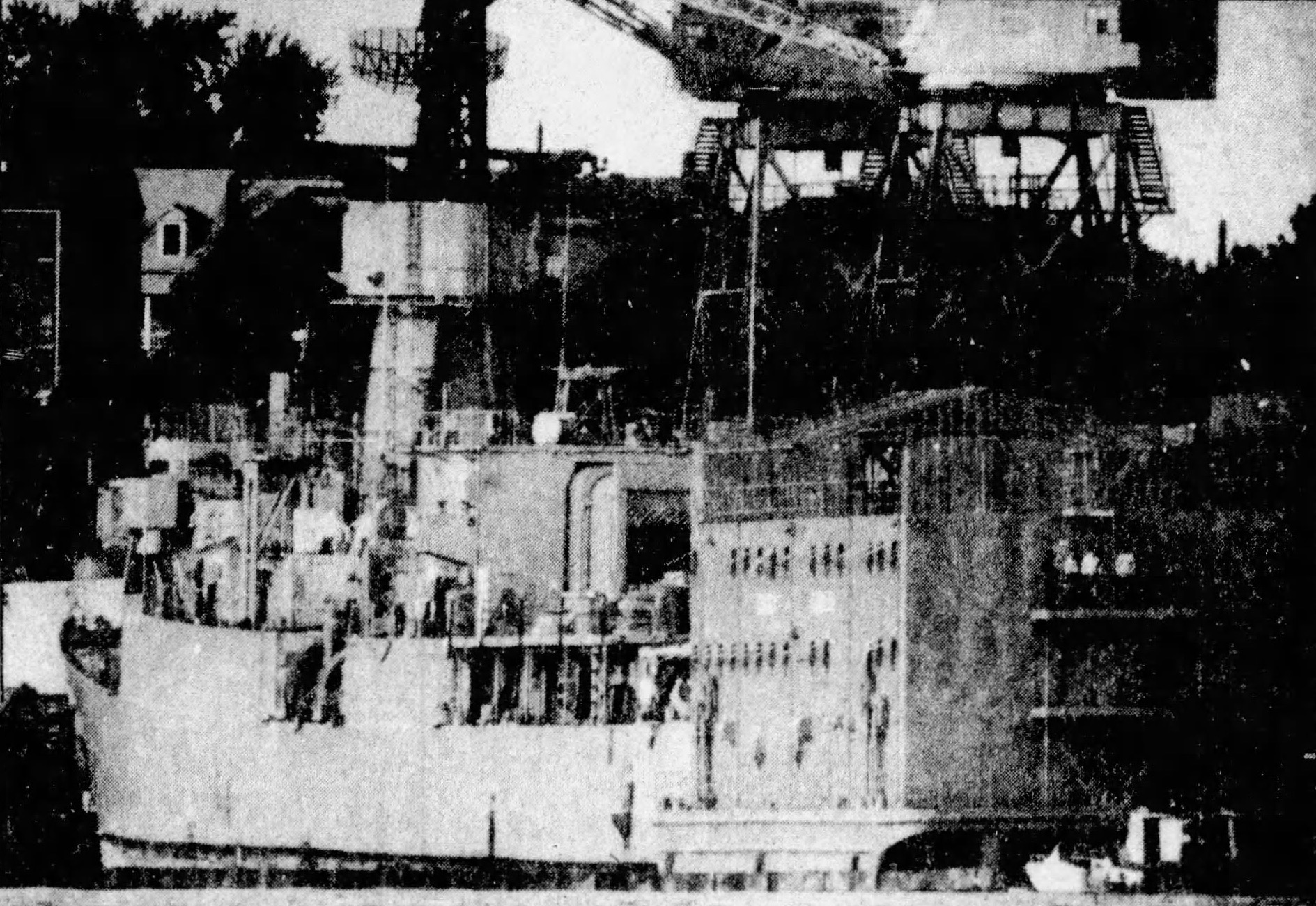
US Navy frigate Connole held hostage in East Boston yard.

Following these incidents, Navy Captain Louis Schappicchio announced they would be pulling all of their ships out of the East Boston yard, until Senator Edward Kennedy and East Boston community representatives met with Navy officials to discuss ways of abating violence. However, Bethlehem Steel decided to pull out of East Boston less than two years later and called for the closing of the shipyard after they could not find a buyer. A buyer was eventually found when a group of investors led by the former general manager of a small shipyard in Chelsea agreed to buy the yard and perform an investigation into ways to control violence and crime.

During 1982–1984 a total of 68 ships were repaired for the Navy at this yard. In April 1984 another major race attack happened when a black sailor aboard the USS Valdez was stabbed by a gang of men walking across Maverick Square. Following this incident the Navy abruptly pulled out with zero notice leaving workers stunned when they showed up on the cold morning of September 21 for work to equipment removed and tools tossed out. The Navy released a statement the following day stating that workplace safety of the East Boston Shipyard was not proceeding according to Navy Standards.

In response to the immediate shutdown, Senator Kennedy and Boston Mayor Raymond Flynn ordered the workers to lock the $18 million dollar USS Connole mast between the booms of two huge cranes and ordered flotation buoys placed across its stern, essentially holding the Navy hostage. Mayor Flynn remarked "The whole issue is what is the Navy's commitment to Boston? These are important jobs for you but they are also important jobs for the city's economy. I support the workers blockade." The standoff received international press coverage and lasted a total of 4 days, only ending when the Navy went to US district Judge Robert E. Keeton for a restraining order on the workers, who ordered federal marshals into the shipyard to unlock the ship and remove employees from the job site. A total of 460 union workers lost their jobs, affecting huge chunks of families in the East Boston area. This would mark the second to last major shipyard in Massachusetts to close down, and one of the oldest shipyards in the entire country.

== Modern use today ==
In 1985 the land was auctioned off to Massachusetts Port Authority for $10 million, after they doubled their offer to outbid all other industrial developers who were looking to rebuild the yard during the Reagan administration. The original highest bid for the shipyard was $9.1 million by a Boston developer, Eastmare Corp. Eastmare planned to develop the property for commercial and residential uses, as well as construct a marina there. However when final bidding opened up, Massport raised its initial $5.5 million offer to $10 million. The next closest bid was $9.7 million by Simpson Point Associates of Boston. Massport stated its determination to preserve industry and stop the spread of luxury condominiums along Boston's waterfront, Massport Deputy Director stating "We didn't want it to be turned into condos."

Not everyone was pleased at the time including the Executive Director of East Boston Community Development who stated "Massport has owned the adjoining East Boston piers for more than a decade and done nothing with them. We're talking about more than 100 acres of East Boston waterfront and nothing's happening with it." Original proposals included building an industrial park that was to include a yacht construction facility as well as a ferry and submarine repair yard that would be completed by the year 1988. These plans were never approved by the city and large chunks of original land today have since been auctioned off to luxury housing along the Boston waterfront.

In recent time the original Atlantic Works site on Border Street hosts the Atlantic Works Gallery, a community center and collaborative space for art and ideas. On the original Bethlehem-Simpson site along Jeffries Point on Marginal Street sits a variety of condo developments, recreational centers, and abandoned lots on what is known as the "Massport Marina". The city of Boston would never return to shipbuilding as competition moved to other regions of the country and overseas, and the headquarters for shipbuilders union would relocate out of Quincy.

== See also ==
- Atlantic Works v. Brady
