= USS Barry (DD-933) =

US Navy destroyer commissioned 1956

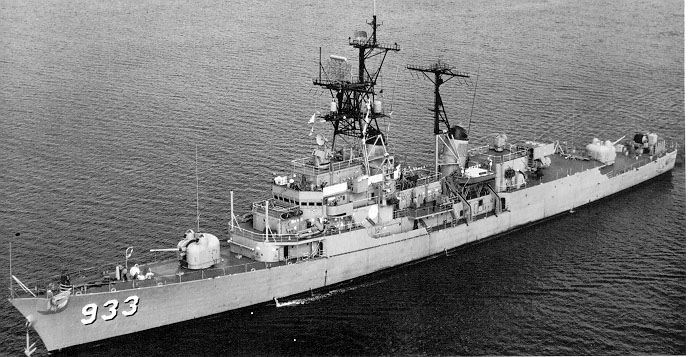
- Barry, 1971

History

United States
- Name: Barry
- Namesake: John Barry
- Ordered: 15 December 1952
- Builder: Bath Iron Works
- Laid down: 15 March 1954
- Launched: 1 October 1955
- Sponsored by: Mrs. Francis Rogers
- Acquired: 31 August 1956
- Commissioned: 7 September 1956
- Decommissioned: 5 November 1982
- Stricken: 31 January 1983
- Fate: Scrapped at Brownsville, Texas, completed by 11 February 2022

General characteristics
- Class & type: Forrest Sherman-class destroyer
- Displacement: 4,050 tons
- Length: 418 ft 6 in (128 m)
- Beam: 45 ft (13.7 m)
- Draught: 19 ft 6 in (5.9 m)
- Propulsion: 70,000 shp (52.2 MW); Geared turbines, two propellers
- Speed: 33 knots (61 km/h; 38 mph)
- Range: 4500 nautical miles (8,300 km)
- Complement: 337
- Electronic warfare & decoys: 5
- Armament: (in 1956); 3 × 5 in (127 mm)/54, 2 × 3 in (76 mm)/50 twin mounts, 2 × ASW hedgehogs (Mk 11), 4 × 21 inch (533 mm) Mk 25 torpedo tubes; (in 1967); 2 × 5 in (127 mm)/54, 1 × ASROC launcher; 2 × triple 13 in Mk 32 torpedo tubes

USS Barry (DD-933) was one of eighteen Forrest Sherman-class destroyers of the United States Navy, and was the third US destroyer to be named for Commodore John Barry. Commissioned in 1954, she spent most of her career in the Caribbean, Atlantic, and Mediterranean, but also served in the Vietnam War, for which she earned two battle stars. Another notable aspect of her service was the Cuban Missile Crisis in 1962. Decommissioned in 1982, she became the "Display Ship Barry" (DS Barry), a museum ship at the Washington Navy Yard in Washington, D.C., in 1984.

Renovation of DS Barry to allow her to continue as a museum ship was deemed too expensive to justify. Furthermore, the planned construction of a fixed-span bridge to replace the Frederick Douglass Memorial Bridge, a swing bridge, would have trapped her at the Washington Navy Yard permanently. Scrapping was therefore the only realistic option. An official departure ceremony for the ship took place on 17 October 2015, and she was towed away on 7 May 2016 to be scrapped in Philadelphia. Scrapping was completed by 11 February 2022.

== Construction and commissioning ==
Barry was laid down on 15 March 1954 at Bath, Maine, by the Bath Iron Works Corporation; launched on 1 October 1955; sponsored by Mrs. Francis Rogers, a great-grandniece of Commodore Barry; and commissioned at the Boston Naval Shipyard, Charlestown, Massachusetts, on 7 September 1956; Commander Isaac C. Kidd, Jr., in command.

== 1956–1959 ==
Barry fitted out at the Boston Naval Shipyard through November, testing her new electronics, ASW gear, and gunnery systems into December. After a brief underway period in Narragansett Bay, she departed 3 January 1957 for Guantánamo Bay, Cuba, to continue her shakedown. Her training exercises were interspersed with port visits to Kingston, Jamaica; Culebra, Puerto Rico, and Santa Marta, Colombia, before she departed for Colón, Panama.

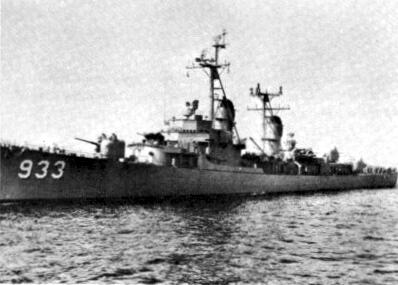
Barry around 1956.

The destroyer transited the Canal Zone on 26 February and anchored at Salinas, Ecuador, two days later to begin the first of three "goodwill" visits to Latin American ports. After a five-day visit, she departed for Callao, Peru. Arriving 5 March, she hosted the United States Ambassador to Peru, the Honorable Theodore C. Achilles, and the Prefect of Callao, before sailing for Valparaíso, Chile, on 9 March. Three days later, Barry's Captain received official calls from the Chilean provincial governor, the Commander in Chief of the Chilean Navy, Vice Almirante Francisco O'Ryan; the American consul to Valparaíso, and the American Commandant, First Naval Zone; all on the same afternoon. After refueling operations, she cleared Valparaíso on 17 March and shaped course for Panama. Transiting the Canal Zone on 23 March, where she damaged a ship's-boat boom in Gatun Locks, she reached Boston on 29 March with her shakedown completed.

The destroyer underwent post-shakedown alterations and repairs at the Boston Naval Shipyard. She cleared the harbor on 15 May for a schedule of local operations off New England. On 27 June Barry departed for Rosslare, Ireland, and her first deployment to Europe. She visited St. Nazaire, France, and Lisbon, Portugal, before arriving at Gibraltar on the morning of 16 July. Assigned to the 6th Fleet, the destroyer escorted carriers, operated as plane guard, and conducted ASW barrier patrols before returning to Newport, Rhode Island, in August.

On 24 September, after several weeks of post-deployment repairs and upkeep, she steamed into Narragansett Bay to assist the Norwegian freighter Belleville which lay aground off Seal Rock. On 26 September, she helped escort the nuclear submarine Seawolf, carrying President Dwight D. Eisenhower, as she conducted a diving demonstration off Newport. After several months of routine operations, including antisubmarine warfare (ASW) exercises and plane guard operations with the carriers Forrestal and Leyte, the destroyer spent May 1958, preparing for her next deployment to the Mediterranean.

Underway 6 June, she transited the Straits of Gibraltar and reached Rhodes on the morning of 20 June. For the next three weeks, Barry operated with the 6th Fleet, conducted standard ASW exercises until 14 July, when a coup, organized by young military officers, seized Baghdad and declared a republic in Iraq. The Lebanese government, led by a Christian president, Camille Chamoun, feared a similar revolution might grow out of a Pan-Arab insurgency active in the Bekaa, Tripoli, and Beirut. President Camille Chamoun, following a pro-western policy, immediately requested that the United States land troops to stabilize the situation between Christians, Muslims, and Druze. President Eisenhower honored the request and, fearing the spread of Egyptian and Syrian influence, ordered Marines to Lebanon that same day.

Barry moored at Salonika, Greece, got underway the next morning, 15 July, to operate with Saratoga as her Task Group stood watch over the eastern Mediterranean. She remained in the region, patrolling the Lebanese coast and escorting carriers to support the Marines ashore. After upkeep alongside Grand Canyon at İzmir, Turkey, and fleet operations in Augusta Bay, Sicily, she sailed for home 17 September. Entering Boston Naval Shipyard 14 October, Barry received, after extensive alternations to her forefoot, the new bow-mounted SQS-23 sonar. Emerging from the yard 17 March, she spent the remainder of the year working up the sonar gear and carrying out tactical trials out of NS Newport and Key West. After a brief yard period at Boston in December, the destroyer conducted routine East Coast operations through May 1960.

== 1960–1962 ==
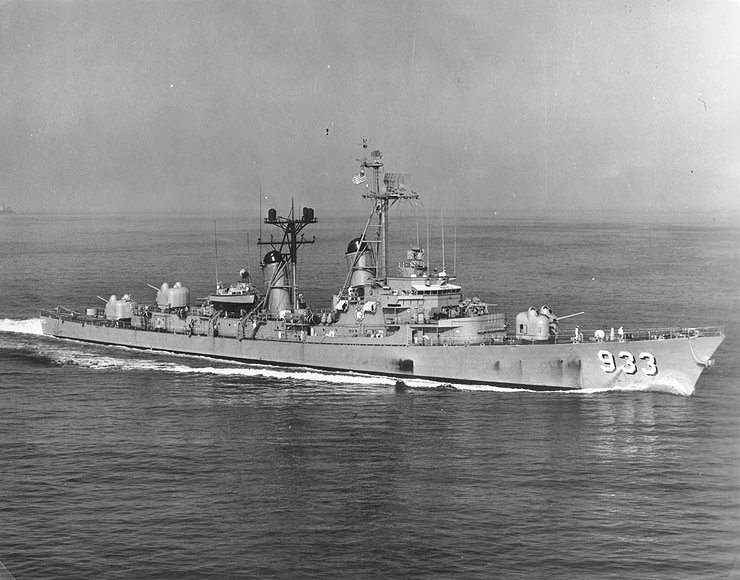
Barry, after being fitted with a bow-mounted sonar

She cleared Newport on 6 June for a summer goodwill tour and sonar demonstration cruise to Northern Europe. Before the end of June, Barry visited Portsmouth, England, and Kiel, Germany, to conduct naval reviews and in-port sonar demonstrations. During July, when she visited the Netherlands, Finland, Sweden, Denmark, and Belgium, the destroyer's crew found the regional navies were eager to discuss technological and security concerns. Furthermore, as Barry conducted four at-sea sonar demonstrations with friendly submarines, foreign naval officers were impressed with U.S. naval technology. In August, after exercises with French and Portuguese diesel submarines, the destroyer returned to Newport on 31 August.

After local operations and a port visit to Montreal, Quebec, Canada, Barry set out for the Virginia Capes operation areas on 9 January 1961, for hunter-killer ASW exercises. After a brief drydock period at Boston, she ranged the eastern seaboard, conducting tactical tests on her bow sonar and participating in amphibious exercises, from Guantanamo Bay to Halifax, Nova Scotia. After another long yard period at the Boston Naval Shipyard, she departed for the Mediterranean with a task group formed around Randolph in June 1962. The destroyer operated with the 6th Fleet for the next two months, watching a steady flow of Soviet merchant ships sail out of the Black Sea towards Cuba before returning to Newport in August for post-deployment upkeep.

== Cuban Missile Crisis ==
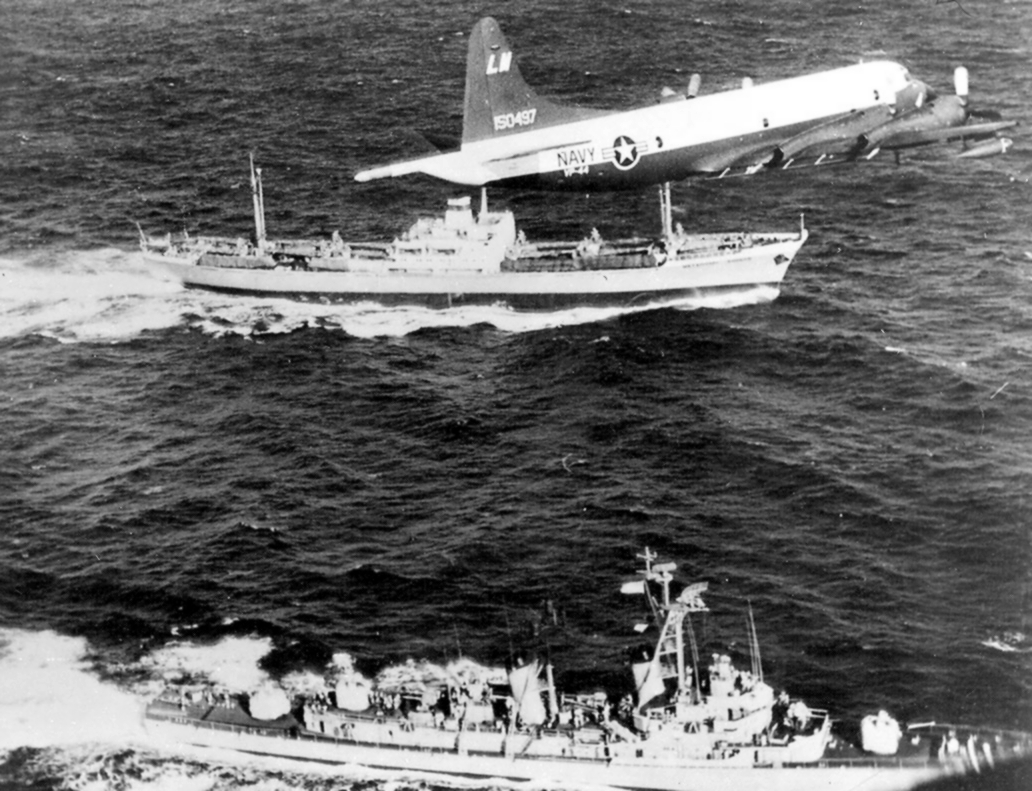
Barry, a P-3A Orion from VP-44, and Soviet ship Metallurg Anosov in November 1962.

On 16 October, the day President John F. Kennedy was shown aerial reconnaissance photographs of Soviet nuclear missiles and launch sites under construction in Cuba, Barry was still undergoing upkeep at Newport. On 22 October, when President Kennedy told the nation that he had initiated "as strict quarantine of all offensive military equipment under shipment to Cuba", she cleared Newport on the night of 22 October, in company with Blandy, Charles S. Sperry and Keppler. After rendezvous with Essex on the 26th, she operated as a screening vessel and plane guard. Two days later, she was detached to operate on ASW surveillance and, after taking over the task from Bache and Eaton, kept a close watch on contact C-19, a surfaced Soviet submarine. Barry, at this time well east of the "Quarantine" line, kept the Foxtrot-class diesel boat under surveillance until it submerged at 1814 that evening.

Barry remained on the line, carrying out patrols, until 8 November when, during refueling operations with Essex, the destroyer had embarked, via highline transfer, a three-person photographic and interpreter party. Barry, ordered to investigate a Soviet merchantman, proceeded to her station on the 9th and sighted the merchant ship that evening. She closed to within 400 yards (370 m) on the merchantman's starboard quarter, illuminated the ship's quarter and bow, and identified her as the Soviet-registry Metallurg Anosov. Trailing astern, Barry followed the merchant ship, heading east away from the quarantine zone until morning. After dawn, the destroyer closed the merchant to "obtain photographs of deck cargo" until late morning when she shaped course for Essex to refuel and transfer photographic personnel.

== 1962–1965 ==
With her part in the "Cuban Quarantine" completed, Barry reached Narragansett Bay on 15 November for upkeep. She put out to sea for exercises with Essex on 30 November, ranging as far as Santo Domingo, in the Dominican Republic and San Juan, Puerto Rico, before returning to Newport on 21 December. For the next six months, Barry carried out type-training and ASW exercises before entering the Boston Naval Shipyard in June 1963 for a scheduled interim overhaul period. Later that summer Barry, with midshipmen embarked for at-sea training, cruised the eastern seaboard of the United States. While the midshipmen enjoyed the ports of call, including New York and Halifax, Nova Scotia, they also had to ride out a hurricane off Bermuda.

The year 1964 saw Barry following a similar routine of exercises. On 27 March, while bound to Puerto Rico, the destroyer received a distress call; a serious fire had broken out in the forward hold, from the stores issues ship Antares. Barry's fire and rescue party, the first assistance to arrive, helped extinguish the blaze after an 18-hour battle. A short deployment followed, during which Barry participated in a joint NATO exercise with three German destroyers along the Atlantic coast.

In later July, after Warrington lost steering control during a highline transfer and damaged Barry, the destroyer spent a week in Boston Naval Shipyard. Administrative and operational preparations followed and, on 7 September 1964, Barry sailed for a three-and-a-half-month deployment in European and Mediterranean waters. After initial NATO exercises in the Norwegian Sea, during which Barry crossed the Arctic Circle on 21 September, she sailed south for antisubmarine screening with the 6th Fleet. Visits to Valencia and Barcelona, Spain; Palma de Mallorca; Marseille and Toulon, France; and Naples, Italy, provided diversion for the ship's company between U.S. and NATO operations "Teamwork", "Masterstroke", and "Steel Pike I". She returned to Newport on 18 December.

In February 1965, Barry ventured south to the Caribbean for the annual spring training exercises. In June, she acted as an assistant recovery ship for the Gemini 4 space shot. The balance of the summer, highlighted by her winning the Squadron Battle Efficiency "E" for ASW, was spent preparing for the destroyer's first Western Pacific deployment. As the flagship of Destroyer Squadron 24 (DesRon 24), the first group of Atlantic Fleet destroyers to deploy to Vietnam, she departed Newport with Samuel B. Roberts, Charles S. Sperry (DD-697), Hawkins, Vesole, and Ingraham on 29 September. The Norfolk-based Harold J. Ellison and Bache accompanied the squadron.

== Vietnam War ==
Passing through the Panama Canal on 6 October, Barry touched at Hawaii, for a short liberty, and Midway before crossing the International Date Line the night of 25 October. At 0100, the "calendar was advanced to the 27th and 26 October was lost forever". After visiting the Japanese ports of Yokosuka and Sasebo, she reached Subic Bay, in the Philippines, on 17 November, and commenced type training at the Tabones Naval Gunfire Support Range. Barry cleared Subic Bay on 30 November in company with Task Group 77.7, including Enterprise, Bainbridge, and Samuel B. Roberts for the South China Sea.

Arriving on station at "Point Dixie", off the coast of South Vietnam, Barry screened the nuclear-powered carrier during airstrikes against Viet Cong positions near Biên Hòa and throughout South Vietnam on 2 December. Leaving the carrier to continue these "milk-run" strikes, to allow pilots and crew to become accustomed to combat, Barry was ordered to the South Vietnamese coast for gunfire support duty. Steaming slowly up the Saigon River near Vũng Tàu on the morning of 7 December, she was given orders to bombard Viet Cong positions several miles east of the river. For two days, her 5-inch (127 mm) guns fired on supply points and entrenchments, getting credit from Army air spotters for "excellent target coverage", before moving to the Mekong Delta region. Closing the beach near the coastal town of Cho Phước Hải, Barry continued fire missions in support of III and IV Naval Zones. After firing some 1,500 5 inch (127 mm) rounds, including opportunity fire near Ba Dong and south of Bung Tau, the destroyer rejoined TG 77.7 on 15 December.

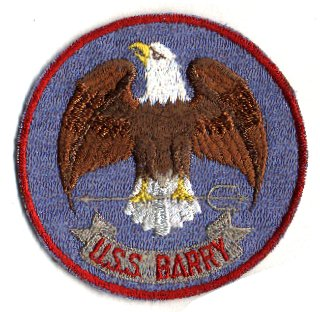
Patch of the USS Barry (DD-933)

Enterprise, steaming off Da Nang at "Point Yankee", launched a series of strikes at North Vietnamese bridges, roads, and supply centers. Barry, screening the carrier as the task group skirted the Gulf of Tonkin, watched as A-4 Skyhawks and F-4 Phantoms struck at North Vietnamese anti-aircraft and radar defense systems. Further strikes, on 22 December, disabled the Uông Bí power complex, the Hải Dương bridge was bombed the following day, and barges and junks were interdicted offshore. Christmas was spent at sea, during an uneasy and temporary truce, and January 1966 saw a resumption of the bombing campaign. Barry continued plane guard and screen duties until 17 January when the entire task group arrived at Subic Bay.

Alongside Piedmont, conducting repairs needed after 48 days of continuous combat operations, the destroyer's crew expected a week of upkeep at Subic followed by a liberty in Hong Kong. However, on the very next day, Barry received orders to get underway in 36 hours for "special operations" in South Vietnam. After laboring for two straight nights and a day, the destroyer, assisted by repair crews from Piedmont, managed to reassemble her machinery in time to steam out of Subic Bay the morning of 19 January.

Attached to III Marine Amphibious Force (III MAF), Barry was to provide naval gunfire coverage for the landing of 5,000 Marines on beaches north of Đức Phổ in Quảng Ngãi province on 28 January. Three battalions were landed, by helicopter and landing craft, in the largest combat assault since Inchon during the Korean War. Despite light rain and rough weather, the initial stage of Operation "Double Eagle" was completed in two days. As the Marines moved inland, searching for two suspected NVA regiments, they encountered scattered Viet Cong guerrillas instead. For the next five days, Barry, with the cruiser Oklahoma City, provided fire missions for reconnaissance teams, conducted harassing fire at night, and commanded a South Vietnamese junk patrol designed to counter VC coastal infiltration.

Detached south on 5 February, to support 1st Cavalry and ARVN units in Operation "Masher-White Wing", Barry ranged 150 miles (240 km) of coastline, firing harassing missions against Viet Cong positions. Having fired over 700 5 inch (127 mm) rounds in combat and hosting several 1st Cavalry officers aboard, the destroyer departed 15 February for a liberty in Hong Kong.

Barry earned two battle stars for her service in the Vietnam War.

== 1966–1970 ==
Clearing the British Crown Colony on 25 February, Barry, after rendezvous with the scattered units of Destroyer Squadron (DesRon) 24, sailed for Penang, Malaysia. After refueling on 1 March, and the traditional Shellback ceremony south of Singapore, the destroyers "chopped" to U.S. Atlantic Fleet upon arrival at Cochin, India. A reception by Indian naval officers followed before the squadron proceeded to the British Protectorate of Aden. On 12 March Barry transited the Suez Canal, pushed on to Naples and Barcelona, before stopping to refuel at Gibraltar, B.C.C. After a final fuel stop at Ponta del Gada, Azores, the destroyers steamed into Newport, having circumnavigated the globe, on 8 April 1966.

After a month of leave and tender availability, Barry, and other ships of DesRon 24 conducted two weeks of torpedo firing, gunnery, and engineering training exercises. A brief series of engineering tests were conducted at Boston Naval Shipyard, preparatory to her scheduled overhaul the following January, before a midshipman training cruise and amphibious exercises in June. On 23 July Barry entered the Boston shipyard again to begin a gunnery evaluation project.

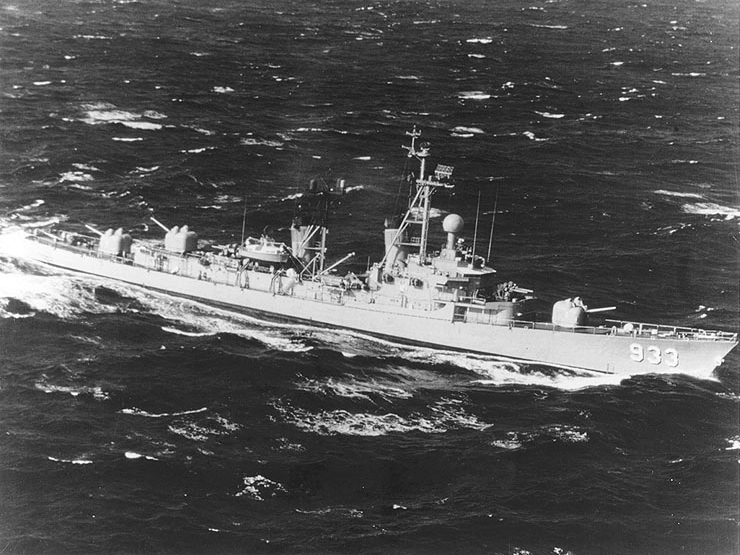
Barry during MK-86 GFCS testing, with AN/SPQ-9 antenna visible.

The project, a single-ship evaluation of the new Mk 86 fire control system, involved the installation of an optical pulse-compression radar and an experimental gun platform on the destroyer. While in drydock, shipyard personnel also completed long-delayed engineering repairs and installed a new SQS-23 sonar transducer. Departing Boston on 6 September, Barry spent two months operating out of Newport while Lockheed engineers conducted post-installation tests on the new fire control system. An operational evaluation followed in mid-November when the destroyer sailed to Culebra Island in the Caribbean for the shore bombardment phase of the Mk 86 evaluation. On 5 December, Barry departed for Naval Station Mayport, Florida, and the surface firing evaluation in the Jacksonville Operating Area. Despite bad weather and typical "teething" problems, the tedious process was successfully finished on 15 December.

Entering Boston Naval Shipyard on 4 January 1967 for overhaul and ASW conversion, Barry was decommissioned on 31 January. She received, after a fifteen-month alteration, a variable depth sonar array (VDS), an antisubmarine rocket launcher (ASROC), a new combat information center (CIC), an enclosed bridge, and completely overhauled propulsion and electrical systems. Recommissioned 19 April 1968, Commander Thomas H. Sherman in command, Barry conducted post-overhaul equipment shakedown and shipyard availability for the following year.

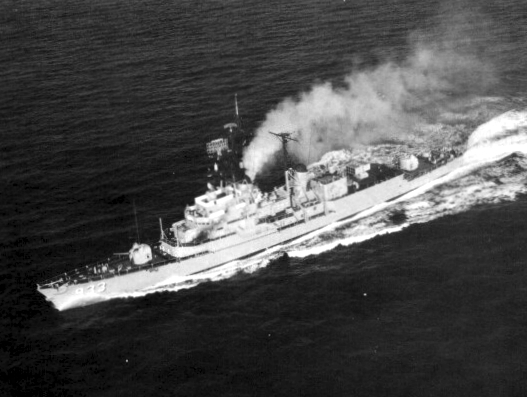
Barry in 1969 after ASROC installation.

On 26 May 1969, after rearming her weapons systems, the destroyer departed for a six-week Caribbean cruise. A week of weapon calibration off St. Croix, and two weeks of refresher training at Guantanamo Bay was followed by a Bar Harbor, Maine, port visit in late July. After rendezvous with Yorktown ASW Group (HUK), the destroyer steamed to European waters for a four-month North Atlantic deployment. In between NATO exercises, including Arctic Circle operations, she visited Antwerp, Oslo, Bergen, and Le Havre for goodwill visits before sailing for Newport on 1 December. Three days later, appropriately while on plane guard duty, Barry rescued the crew of a disabled helicopter.

For the next two years, except for a brief October 1970 deployment to Greece in response to the Jordanian-PLO conflict, the destroyer operated on a routine schedule of type training, operational exercises, port visits, and annual midshipmen cruises. After a three-month regular yard period in early 1972, Barry conducted refresher training, gunfire support qualifications, and ASROC antisubmarine rocket firing tests in the Caribbean. Then, as part of a new forward deployment program, Barry began preparations to change her home port to Athens, Greece.

== 1972–1976 ==
Departing 18 August, she joined the 6th Fleet at Rota, Spain, before sailing into Athens on 1 September. There she joined DESRON 12 along with USS Sampson, USS Richard Byrd, USS William Wood, USS Manley, and USS Vreeland. Following a month-long stand down to settle crew and dependents in new housing, Barry began intensive Fleet operations. NATO exercises with Greek and Turkish ships; goodwill port visits to Italy, Spain, Turkey, and Greece; and ASW training, highlighted by the surfacing of a Soviet Foxtrot-class diesel submarine on 11 January, continued well into 1973.

On 3 July, Barry received an upgrade to her AN/SQS-23 sonar at Hellenic Shipyards, Athens. Port visits to Istanbul, Turkey and Thessaloniki, Greece. In October, Barry was undergoing repairs in the shipyard in Parama, Greece. All hands were recalled to the ship during the night to begin the assembly of the ship in preparation for deployment as an ASW screen ship for the Marine Landing Battalion stationed off the Suez in response to the Soviet naval buildup during the Arab–Israeli war. After receiving clearance to operate Barry steamed to join the 6th Fleet's Amphibious Task Forces. On 16 November, while on reserve station south of Crete, a Marine CH-46 helicopter from Guadalcanal lost engine power during a routine flight while hovering above Barry. With crew members aboard, the craft crashed into the destroyer's ASROC deck, rolled over the starboard side, and almost immediately sank. No one on Barry was injured. The ship's motor whaleboat rescued two members of the three helicopter crew. The ship was immediately sent back to flight quarters to receive a flight surgeon by helicopter to treat the injured airman. Barry returned to Athens for Thanksgiving before resuming further contingency operations, mostly as a carrier escort, which lasted until the end of the year.

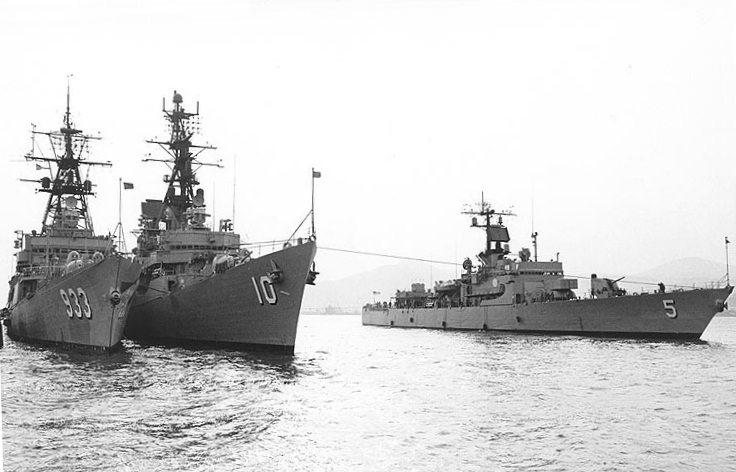
Barry, USS Sampson (DDG-10) and USS Richard L. Page (DEG-5) at Piraeus in 1974.

The destroyer conducted standard patrol operations in 1974. 1974 was highlighted by the commissioning of the US Naval pier in Elefsis, Greece, allowing the ship to go cold iron while in port—providing much-needed relief to the ship and the crew, which had been steaming near continuously since the ship had departed Newport. While anchored in Phalron Bay, in July Barry witnessed the Greek fleet sortie from its base at Salamis with the outbreak of hostilities in the Cyprus Crisis. Barry evacuated approximately 50 military personnel and others from Athens to Naples, Italy and then returned to the Aegean for a month of tense operations during the Cyprus crisis of August and the tracking of an active sonar contact while Admiral James L. Holloway, CNO, was aboard on 19 September. After NATO Exercise "Sardinia 75" in April, including type training with Italian ships, Barry began preparations to leave Athens after the Greek government canceled the naval station agreement.

Departing 20 July, after 36 months of forward deployment, the destroyer steamed via Villefranche-sur-Mer, France; Palma de Mallorca and Rota, Spain, before arriving at Philadelphia on 20 August. The remainder of the year was spent in port. During this period Barry received the Arleigh Burke award, which was presented by Admiral Isaac Kidd, first CO of Barry. Except for her participation in the 200th Navy birthday celebration in New York City, the remainder of the year was spent conducting training exercises or in port. In February 1976, after a three-week ASW training cruise off the coast of Rhode Island, she entered Philadelphia Naval Shipyard for her first major overhaul period since 1968.

== 1977–1979 ==
Barry remained in the yard until 9 February 1977, when she departed for sea trials. She transferred her homeport to Naval Station Mayport, Florida, on 4 March and began a series of shakedown exercises, including weapons qualifications training, that culminated in her fifth deployment to the Mediterranean. She rendezvoused with the carrier America on 29 September, steamed to Lisbon, Portugal, and then on to Naples, Italy, before joining 6th Fleet operations. On the night of 10 November, Barry assisted in the successful rescue, primarily with boats and searchlights, of two crewmembers of an aircraft that had ditched on approach to America. After several missile exercises, ASW training, and a port visit to Dubrovnik, Yugoslavia, Barry finished out her year moored alongside Yosemite in Naples, Italy.

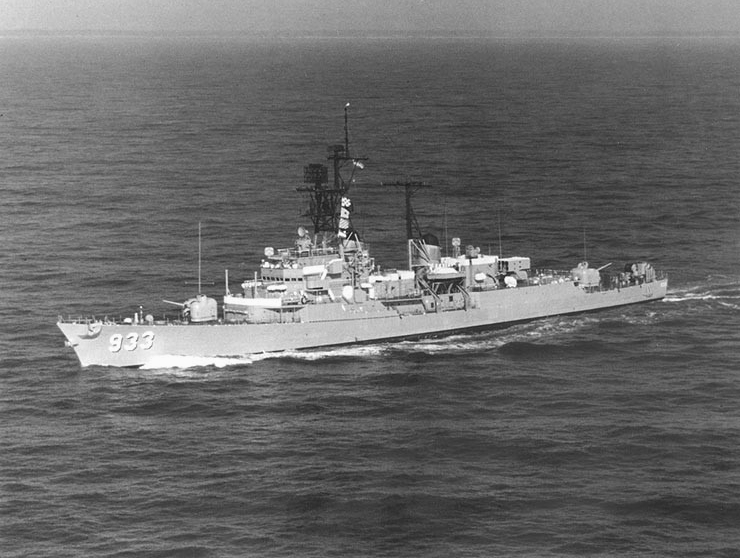
Barry in 1978.

Following a routine visit to Villefranche-sur-Mer, France, Barry steamed through the Straits of Messina in response to an Eastern Mediterranean cruise by units of the Soviet Black Sea Fleet. Between 24 January and 3 February 1978, the destroyer shadowed the Kiev (TAKR) and Moskva (PKR) Task Group while it operated in the Levantine Basin. Barry observed and evaluated Kiev's underway replenishment ability, flight operations and sea-keeping characteristics before returning to Italy. Following "Exercise Sardinia 78", part of NATO's National Week XIV, Barry began a series of exercises off Sicily and Valencia, Spain, before departing for Mayport, Florida, on 14 April. Underway again in late June, the destroyer operated in the Mayport and Chesapeake Bay areas until early August when she prepared for a northern European cruise. Departing on 22 August, as part of Exercise "Common Effort", Barry helped demonstrate NATO's capability to replenish Europe by sea. Operation "Northern Wedding", a major NATO exercise, took place in early September and was followed by a routine port visit to Copenhagen, Denmark. Another NATO exercise, "BALTOP's 78", took place in the Skagerrak and Baltic Sea with units from Germany, the Netherlands, and Norway, through 3 October. Barry then sailed to Helsinki, Finland, her first visit since 1960, before port visits at Bremen, Germany, and Amsterdam, Netherlands. She also stopped at Middlesbrough, United Kingdom, for the Captain James Cook (RN) Festival, before sailing for home. After a brief stop at the Azores to refuel, the destroyer arrived at Mayport on 8 November for upkeep.

The new year began with ASW and naval gunfire support operations off Jacksonville and Puerto Rico until February when Barry underwent repair and maintenance availability in preparation for another Mediterranean deployment. In company with Battle Group 2 (BG2), the destroyer reached Gibraltar on 24 March to begin a series of port visits. On a routine cruise to "show the flag", the ship visited Tunis, Tunisia; Crotone, Italy; Monaco; Toulon, France; and La Spezia, Italy, before participating in National Week XXV with Italian naval units.

Underway on 2 June 1979, in company with Sampson, Barry sailed for the Suez Canal, transiting the waterway on 6 June en route to Djibouti. After a refueling stop and detaching from Sampson, she proceeded to Karachi, Pakistan, for a routine port visit. On arrival on 16 June, she flew the flag of Rear Admiral Samuel H. Packer II, Commander Middle East Forces. Due to the revolutionary events in Iran, the Islamic Republic having been declared 1 April, Barry's next orders deployed her into the Persian Gulf to support American civilians/personnel in Iran and reassure friendly countries in the region. Arriving at Bahrain on 23 June, she underwent repair availability before starting patrol operations in the Persian Gulf on 4 July. After a port visit to Abu Dhabi, United Arab Emirates, she conducted surveillance and counter-terrorism patrols in the Straits of Hormuz. Joined by the Sultanate of Oman Navy in these patrols and interspersed with fuel stops at Muscat, Oman and Sitrah, Bahrain, Barry continued routine patrols until 31 July when she departed for Djibouti. After a brief fuel stop, she then stopped in Victoria, Seychelles for a port visit before rendezvousing with Sampson and Elmer Montgomery on 20 August for a return to the Mediterranean. She transited the Suez Canal on 25 August and then visited Barcelona, Spain, eventually rejoining BG-2 at Rota, Spain. Underway for Mayport, Florida, the destroyer arrived home on 21 September for post-deployment leave and upkeep. The remainder of the year was spent conducting local operations out of Mayport and preparing for a scheduled overhaul the following year.

== 1980–1982 ==
On 17 January 1980, Barry's homeport was changed to Boston, and the following day, she entered Bethlehem Steel Shipyard, Boston, for a year-long regular overhaul. Once hull maintenance began, the crew moved into quarters ashore as extensive repair and overhaul of the engineering plant, electronic suite, and weapons systems were performed. The ship departed drydock on 7 August and moored alongside Pier #2 to complete the remaining repair work. Ultimately, Barry got underway on 31 March 1981 for her shakedown. Over the next few months, the ship ranged from Newport to the Virginia Capes, working to rejoin the fleet, spending much of that time on local operations in the Narragansett Bay area. While conducting further refresher training in the Bahamas and at Guantanamo Bay, operations were suddenly canceled when the ship received a message directing her to return to Newport to prepare for a Middle East deployment.

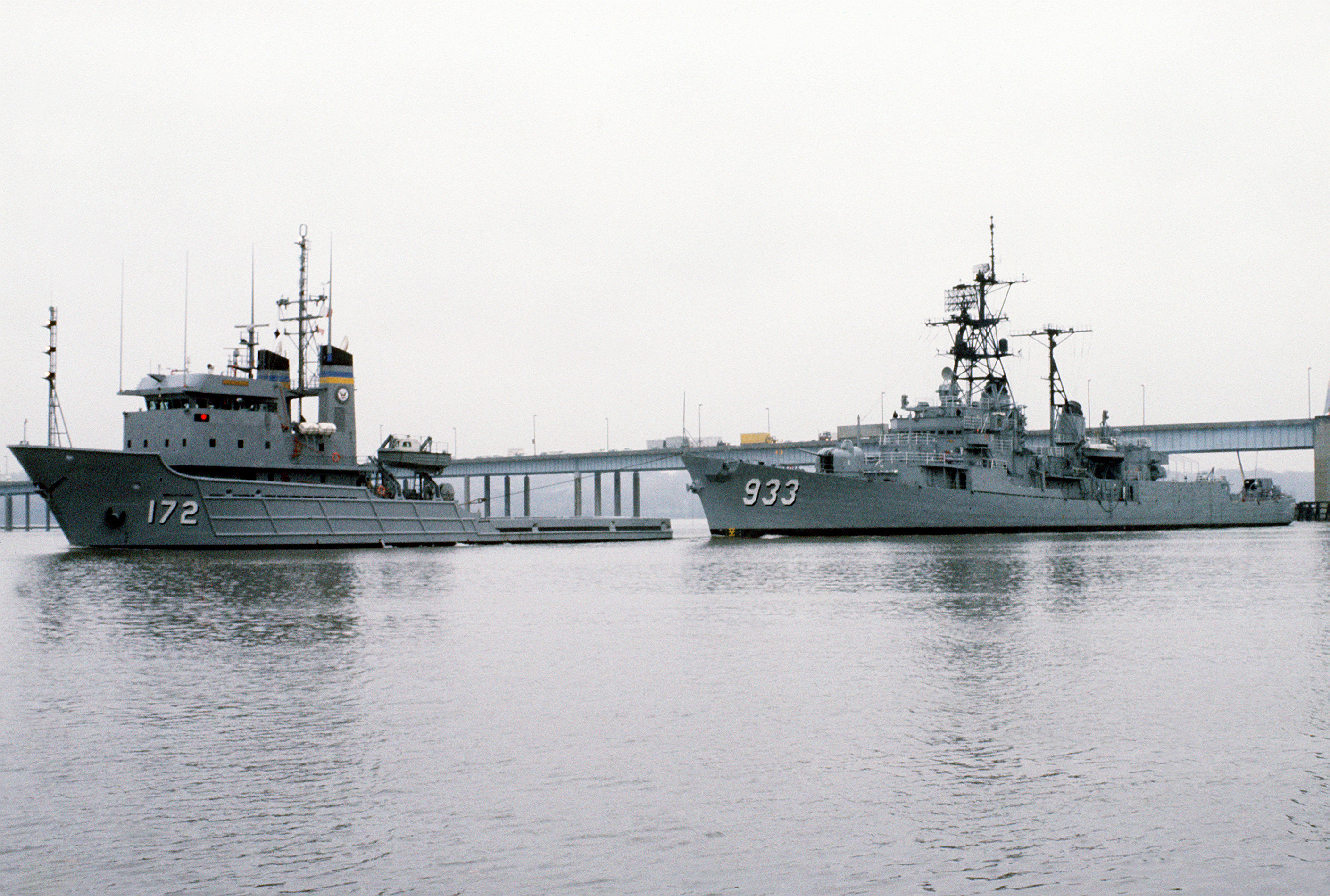
USNS Apache (T-ATF-172) (left), a U.S. Navy tug, towing the decommissioned Barry (right) up the Anacostia River on 18 November 1983 as Barry arrives as a museum ship at the Washington Navy Yard.

Barry steamed for her assignment on 10 November 1981, bound for Hamilton, Bermuda on the first leg of her transit of the Atlantic. The ship sailed for the Azores and thence into the Mediterranean, ultimately transiting the Suez Canal on 26–27 November. Joining an Amphibious Readiness Group (ARG) formed around Saipan, Raleigh, and Barnstable County, Barry helped escort these ships through the Bab el Mandeb Straits on the 29th. Steaming separately, the destroyer touched at Djibouti for fuel on 30 November, before joining with the battle group formed around Coral Sea on 1 December.

Barry remained with that unit for a week, acting as a screen and naval gunfire support ship during Operation "Bright Star '82". Following the exercise, the destroyer escorted the ARG's ships back through the Straits of Bab el Mandeb before Barry proceeded down to Mombasa, Kenya, arriving there on 21 December. She remained at Mombasa for the remainder of 1981, departing the Kenyan port on 2 January 1982 to head back to the Persian Gulf. Patrol operations in the Persian Gulf lasted until 9 March, when the destroyer headed home. She reached Newport, via Málaga, Spain, on 9 April.

Over the ensuing months, Barry's schedule of operations was fairly light; she provided support for the American Sail Training Association's "Tall Ships '82" race, visited Bristol, R.I., and served as escort and host ship for the Italian cruiser Duilio during that ship's visit to New York City and Philadelphia.

As part of a destroyer replacement program, on 1 September, the ship commenced her final decommissioning stand down in Newport, and on 5 November 1982, Barry was decommissioned. Five days later, under tow of Papago, she was on her way to the Inactive Ship Facility at the Philadelphia Naval Shipyard, reaching that facility on 12 November 1982.

== Display ship, 1984–2015 ==
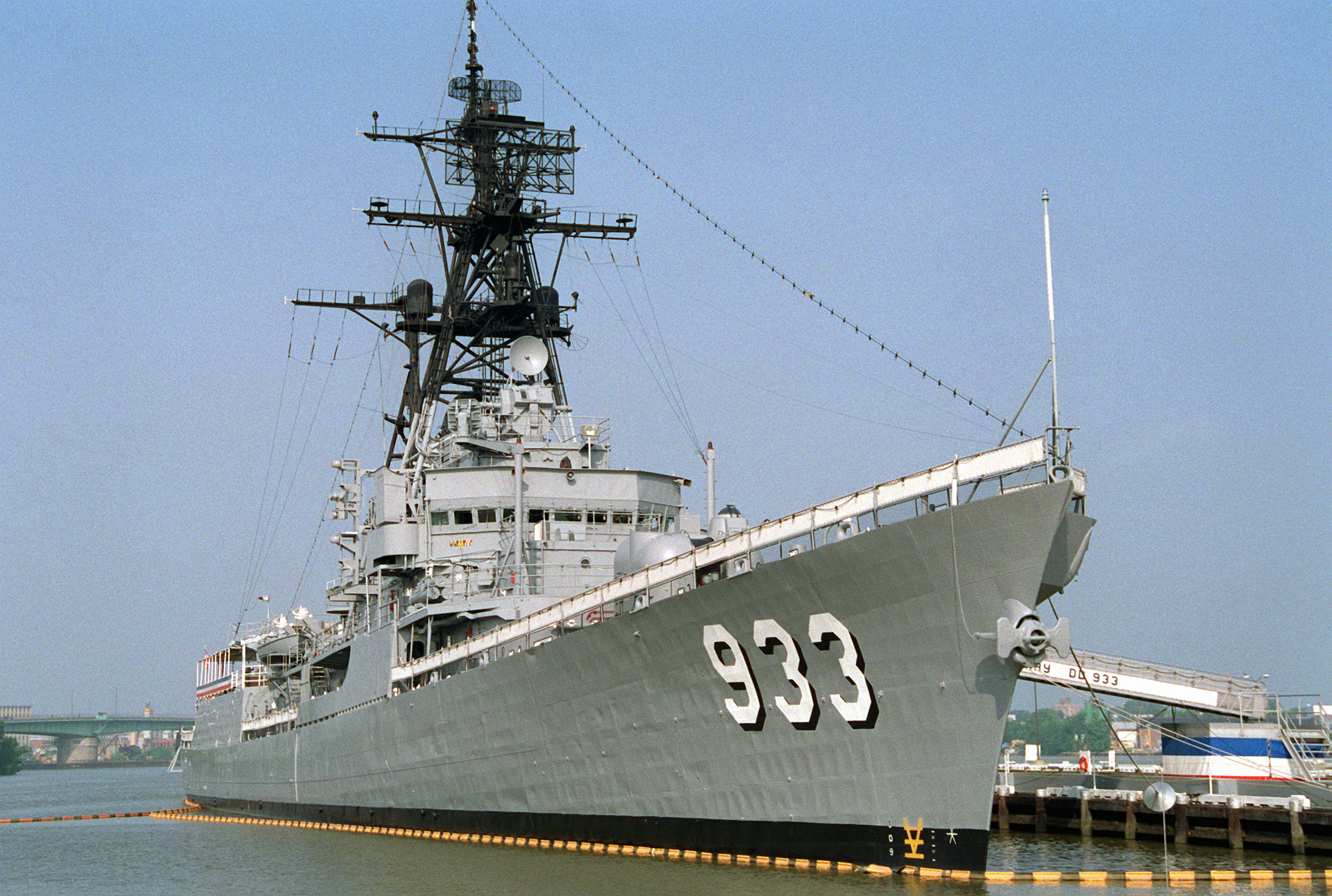
The U.S. Navy museum ship USS Barry (DD-933) tied up along Pier Two at the Washington Navy Yard on 9 June 1994. The ship was permanently moored there from 1983 to 2016 and was open to the public from 1984 to 2015.

After Barry's decommissioning, retired Admiral Arleigh Burke advocated that a U.S. Navy display ship be moored at the Washington Navy Yard on the Anacostia River in Washington, D.C. The Navy chose Barry. She was towed from the Philadelphia Naval Shipyard and arrived at her mooring at the Washington Navy Yard on 18 November 1983. After volunteers repainted the ship and installed museum displays aboard her, Barry opened to the public as Display Ship Barry (DS Barry) in 1984, co-located with the National Museum of the United States Navy but administratively separate from the museum. She served as a distinctive attraction for visitors to the historic area, her former ASROC magazine converted to a display area and with some of her internal areas opened for visitors to tour, including the machine repair shop, the crew berthing room, the wardroom, the mess deck, the bridge, and the combat information center (CIC).

In her early years as a museum ship, DS Barry was a popular attraction, becoming a regular stop for tour buses and school groups; in 1990 alone, 500,000 people visited her. She frequently hosted retirement ceremonies for U.S. Navy officers on her after deck. She also appeared briefly in the background of many television programs; for example, she appeared in two episodes of the CBS television drama NCIS, "Dead Reflections," which aired on 12 April 2011, and "Newborn King," which aired on 13 December 2011.

== Disposal ==
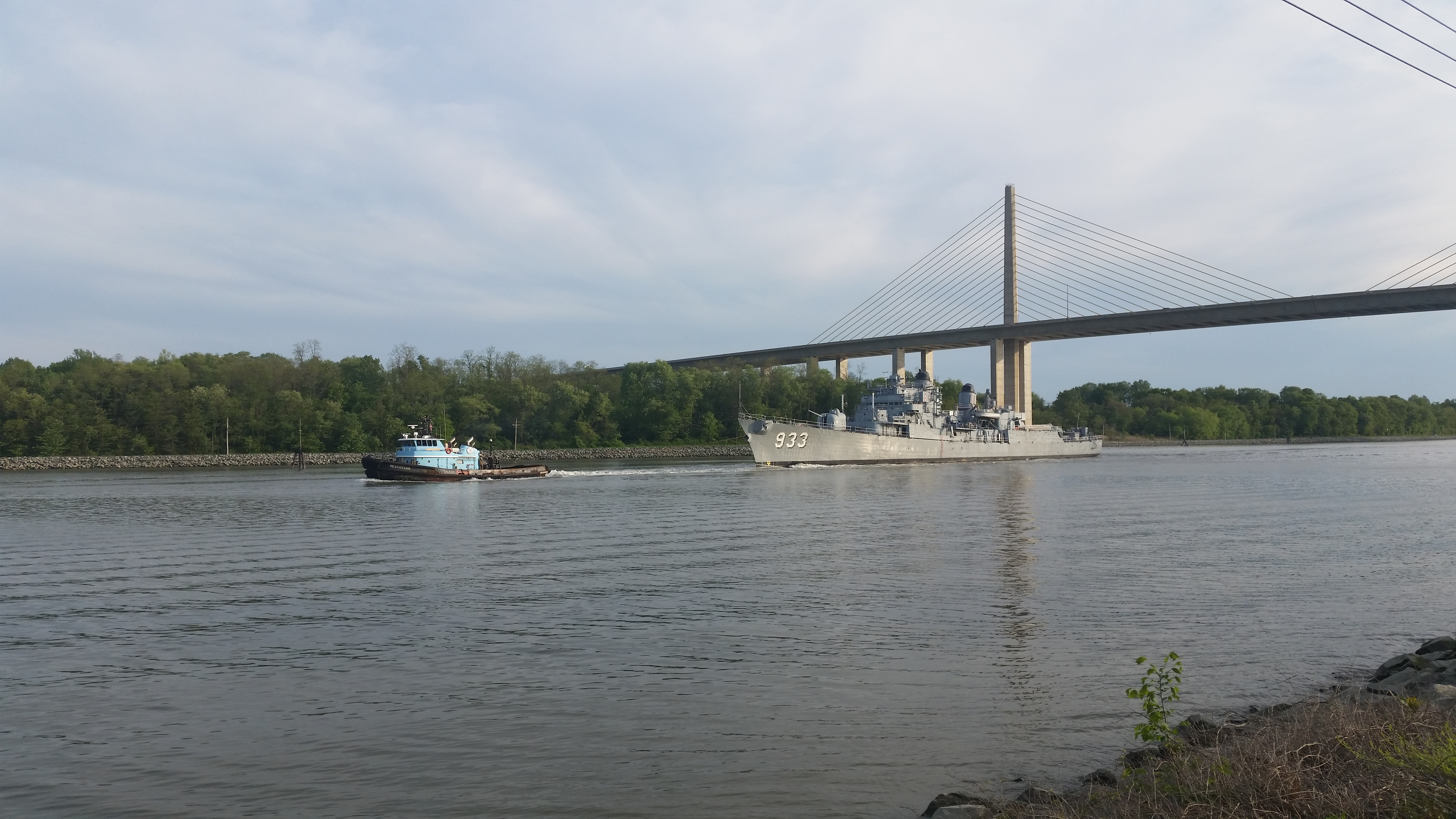
DD-933 while being towed beneath the Senator William V. Roth Jr. Bridge on 8 May 2016 en route to Philadelphia.

The number of visitors to DS Barry began to decline after 1990, and by 2015 had dwindled to only about 10,000 people per year. Although Barry's hull remained seaworthy, it had begun to deteriorate. She required about $2 million in repairs and renovations, an amount the U.S. Navy deemed unaffordable given the low annual number of visitors. Meanwhile, the District of Columbia government had made plans to replace the existing Frederick Douglass Memorial Bridge, a swing bridge, with a new bridge, construction of which was to begin in October 2015. The District of Columbia considered replacing the Frederick Douglass Memorial Bridge with another swing bridge but found that adding a swing capability to the new bridge would add $140 million to its cost plus an additional $100,000 per year for maintenance; instead, the city government opted for a fixed-span bridge that, when complete, would trap Barry in the Anacostia River.

For all these reasons, the U.S. Navy decided to close DS Barry and tow her away for scrapping before construction of the new bridge advanced to the point of trapping her in the Anacostia River. During the summer of 2015, representatives of the U.S. Navy's Naval History and Heritage Command, followed by representatives of approved non-profit museum ships, visited Barry and removed artifacts from her for display elsewhere, with communications gear being the most popular items. A formal departure ceremony for the ship hosted by Naval Support Activity Washington, attended by more than 50 former Barry crew members and featuring a speech by retired Rear Admiral Sam Cox, director of the Naval History and Heritage Command, took place on 17 October 2015 in the Cold War gallery at the Washington Navy Yard.

On 7 May 2016, DS Barry had her masts cut down and, with a mixed caretaker crew of U.S. Navy and towing company personnel aboard was towed from the Washington Navy Yard by the commercial tugs Emily Ann, Meagan Ann, and Thomas D. Witte. As the ship was towed down the Anacostia River to the Potomac River, a Washington, D.C., fireboat saluted her with a water cannon display, and Joint Base Anacostia-Bolling played the U.S. Navy anthem "Anchors Aweigh" over loudspeakers ashore. Barry was to make a 50-hour journey via the Potomac River, Chesapeake Bay, Chesapeake and Delaware Canal, and Delaware River to the inactive ship facility at the Philadelphia Naval Shipyard, from which she had been towed to Washington in 1983. There she would be mothballed and sold for scrapping. Scrapping was completed by 11 February 2022.

== Awards ==

Navy Expeditionary Medal	National Defense Service Medal	Vietnam Service Medal
Vietnam Campaign Medal	Meritorious Unit Commendation	Armed Forces Expeditionary Medal
