= Atlantic Works v. Brady =

- Supreme Court of the United States

Argued January 17, 1883 Decided March 5, 1883
- Full case name: Atlantic Works v. Edwin L. Brady
- Citations: 107 U.S. 192 (more) 2 S. Ct. 225; 27 L. Ed. 438; 1882 U.S. LEXIS 1215

Court membership
- Chief Justice Morrison Waite Associate Justices Samuel F. Miller · Stephen J. Field; Joseph P. Bradley · John M. Harlan; William B. Woods · Stanley Matthews; Horace Gray · Samuel Blatchford

Case opinion
- Majority: Bradley, joined by unanimous

Atlantic Works v. Brady, 107 U.S. 192 (1883), is a patent infringement decision of the United States Supreme Court, noted for this criticism of allowing patents on trivial inventions that encourage speculators:

The design of the patent laws is to reward those who make some substantial discovery or invention which adds to our knowledge and makes a step in advance in the useful arts. Such inventors are worthy of all favor. It was never the object of those laws to grant a monopoly for every trifling device, every shadow of a shade of an idea. . . . Such an indiscriminate creation of exclusive privileges tends rather to obstruct than to stimulate invention. It creates a class of speculative schemers who make it their business to watch the advancing wave of improvement, and gather its foam in the form of patented monopolies, which enable them to lay a heavy tax upon the industry of the country, without contributing anything to the real advancement of the arts.

== Background ==
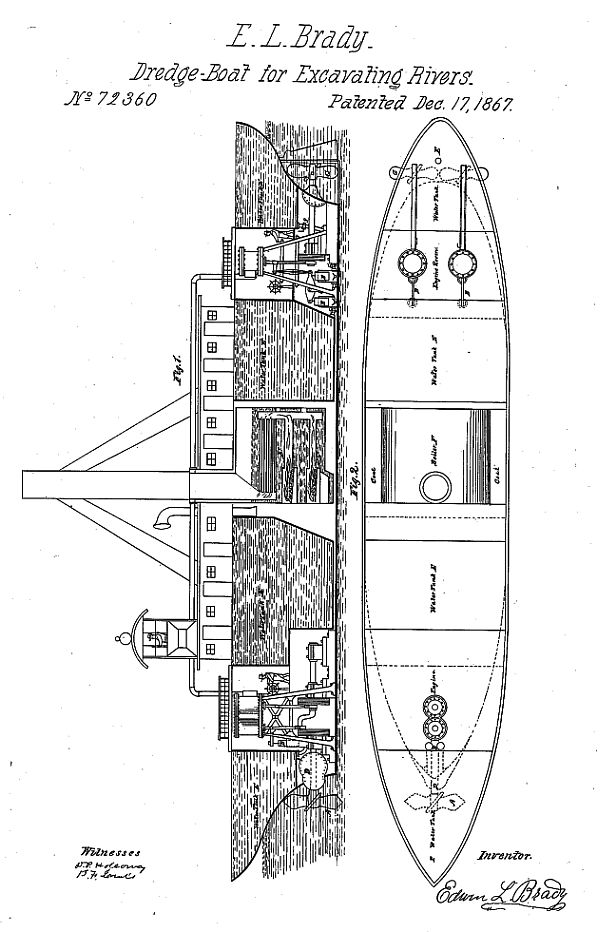
Drawing of Brady's dredging boat, from his patent

Edwin L. Brady obtained a patent on boats for dredging under water. The patented dredge boat consisted of "a strong boat, propelled [preferably] by . . . two propellers placed in the stern of the boat" and driven by a steam engine. The use of two propellers made "the boat more manageable in steering in crooked channels." Near the bow of the boat, Brady placed another steam engine driving a "mud fan," like a propeller but with sharper blades, extending two feet below the bottom of the boat. "[T]heir object is, by their rapid revolution, to displace the sand and mud on the bottom and, stirring them up, to mix them with the water so that they may be carried off by the current." The boat has a series of watertight compartments into or out of which water is pumped so as to sink the vessel to the required depth for dredging.

Brady claimed as his invention:

1. A dredging boat constructed with a series of watertight compartments so proportioned and arranged that as they are filled with water, the boat shall preserve an even keel and the dredging mechanism be brought into action without any adjusting devices, substantially as set forth. 2. The combination of the mud fan attached to a rigid shaft, and a boat containing a series of watertight compartments, so adjusted as to cause the boat to settle on an even keel as the compartments are filled with water, and a pump, for exhausting the water from all the compartments, substantially as set forth.

Atlantic Works of Boston constructed a dredge boat of the same construction as that described in Brady's patent. He sued for patent infringement in the circuit court, seeking an injunction and "an account of all such gains and profits as they, the respondents, have received by their unlawful and wrongful acts and doings." The case was tried before Supreme Court Justice Clifford, as Circuit Justice. He sustained the patent and found it infringed.

== Ruling of Supreme Court ==
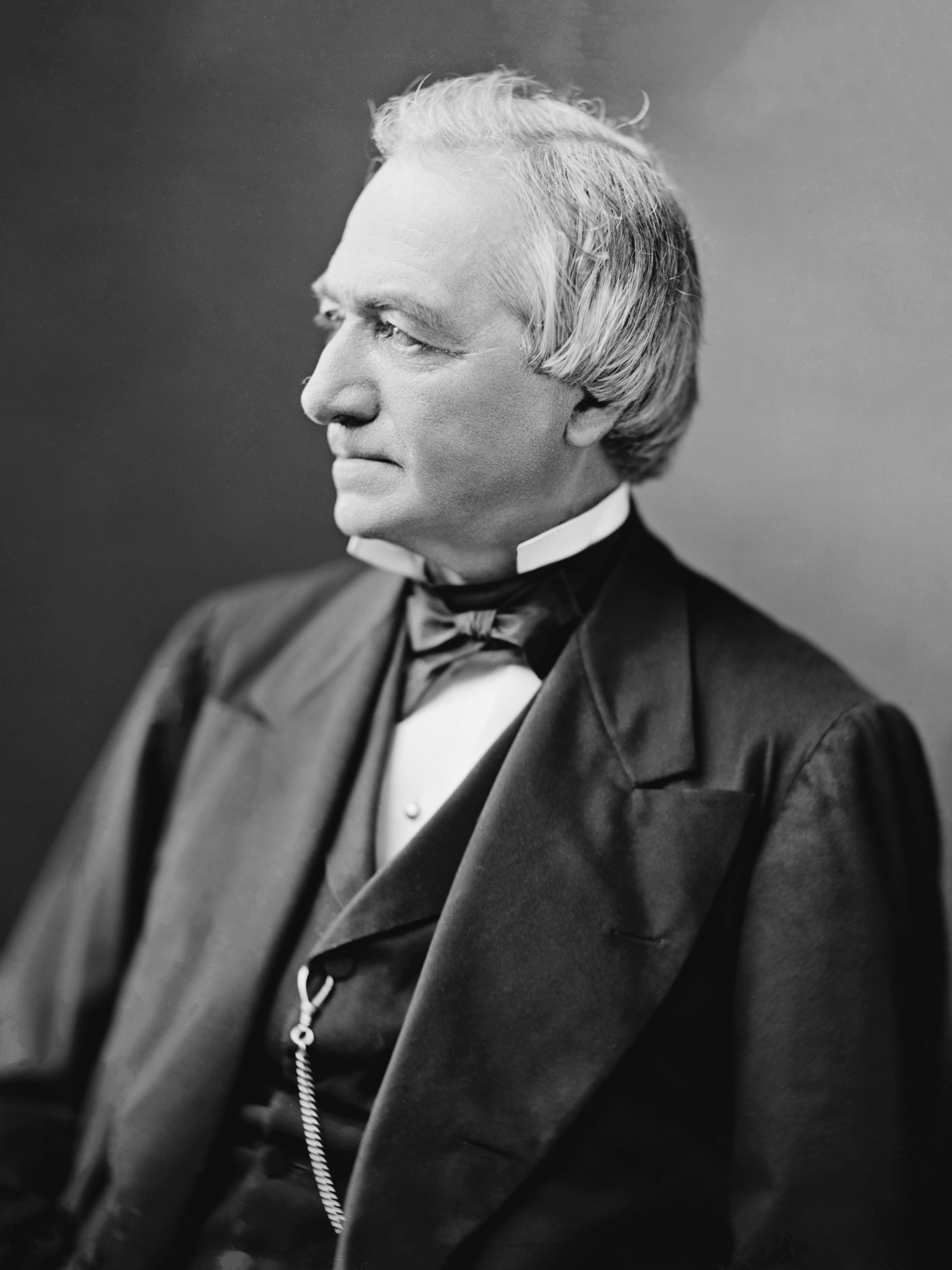
Justice Joseph Bradley

Justice Bradley delivered a unanimous opinion of the Court. He began by analyzing the patent:

It is obvious from reading the specification that the alleged invention consists mainly in attaching a screw (which the patentee calls a mud fan) to the forward end of a propeller dredge boat, provided with tanks for settling her in the water. It is operated by sinking the boat until the screw comes in contact with the mud or sand, which, by the revolution of the screw, is thrown up and mingled with the current.

All the elements were old. The use of a series of tanks for the purpose of keeping the vessel level while she settles "is an old contrivance long used." The use of propeller screws "for the removal of sand and mud accumulated at the mouths of the Mississippi had frequently occurred years before" the patentee's alleged invention. Dredging by "running the vessel up and down over the bar, and thus stirring up the mud with the propeller screw" so that "the screws' coming in contact with the mud and deposit, and the revolutions of the screws about sixty times a minute, would create a current of water by which the sediment would be washed away" was previously used on the Mississippi River.

The Court observed: "It may well be asked at this point where was there any invention in the device described in the patent? Was it invention to place a screw for dredging at the stem of the boat? Nothing more than this was in reality suggested by the patentee." But previous boats used as dredge boats did that. They just ran the boats backwards. "They were turned end for end, and the stern was used as the [bow], and the screws went forward, working in the bottom deposit in advance of the vessels." If, instead of using an existing ordinary boat for dredging, one wanted to construct a boat expressly for dredging, putting the screws at the front would "have been suggested by ordinary mechanical skill." Even though all the elements of Brady's dredge boat were old, could there be invention in combining them? "Did he make a selection and combination of these elements that would not have occurred to any ordinary skilled engineer called upon, with all this previous knowledge and experience before him, to devise the construction of a strong dredge boat for use at the mouth of the Mississippi? We think not. We think that there is no reasonable ground for any such pretension."

The Court explained how technological progress ordinarily occurs:

The process of development in manufactures creates a constant demand for new appliances, which the skill of ordinary head workmen and engineers is generally adequate to devise and which, indeed, are the natural and proper outgrowth of such development. Each step forward prepares the way for the next, and each is usually taken by spontaneous trials and attempts in a hundred different places. To grant a single party a monopoly of every slight advance made, except where the exercise of invention somewhat above ordinary mechanical or engineering skill is distinctly shown, is unjust in principle and injurious in its consequences.

The patent system must be operated knowing this, the Court explained, or technological progress will be hampered instead of being promoted by the patent system:

The design of the patent laws is to reward those who make some substantial discovery or invention which adds to our knowledge and makes a step in advance in the useful arts. Such inventors are worthy of all favor. It was never the object of those laws to grant a monopoly for every trifling device, every shadow of a shade of an idea, which would naturally and spontaneously occur to any skilled mechanic or operator in the ordinary progress of manufactures. Such an indiscriminate creation of exclusive privileges tends rather to obstruct than to stimulate invention. It creates a class of speculative schemers who make it their business to watch the advancing wave of improvement and gather its foam in the form of patented monopolies which enable them to lay a heavy tax upon the industry of the country without contributing anything to the real advancement of the art. It embarrasses the honest pursuit of business with fears and apprehensions of concealed liens and unknown liabilities to law suits and vexatious accountings for profits made in good faith.

The Court therefore ruled: "Our conclusion is that the patent sued on cannot be sustained, and that the decree of the circuit court must be reversed and the cause remanded, with instructions to dismiss the bill of complaint."

== Commentary ==
According to Justin Lee, the key policy guiding Atlantic Works "is the notion that a patent grant is a quid pro quo. The patentee is granted a bundle of exclusionary rights and the public receives in return a disclosure of previously unknown technological know-how." Therefore, if any routine mechanic would devise the claimed invention when con fronted with the problem that the patent addresses, "then the grant of exclusionary rights succeeds only in preventing the public from exercising its rights to practice technology already within its grasp without giving anything back to the public return."
